= 1980–81 Paris Saint-Germain FC season =

11th season of Paris Saint-Germain FC

Paris Saint-Germain
1980–81 season
- President: Francis Borelli
- Manager: Georges Peyroche
- Stadium: Parc des Princes
- Ligue 1: 5th
- Coupe de France: Round of 32
- Top goalscorer: League: Dominique Rocheteau (16); All: Dominique Rocheteau (18)
- Average home league attendance: 22,969
Home colours	Away colours

The 1980–81 season was the 11th season in the history of Paris Saint-Germain FC. PSG played their home league matches at the Parc des Princes, attracting an average of 22,969 spectators per match. The club's president was Francis Borelli, and the team was managed by Georges Peyroche, with Dominique Bathenay serving as captain. PSG finished fifth in Ligue 1 and reached the round of 32 in the Coupe de France. Dominique Rocheteau was the team's top scorer, netting 18 goals in all competitions, including 16 in the league.

== Players ==
=== Squad ===
Players who featured in at least one official match for the club.

Note: Flags indicate national team as defined under FIFA eligibility rules; some limited exceptions apply. Players may hold more than one non-FIFA nationality.

No.	Pos.	Nation	Player
—	GK	FRA	Dominique Baratelli
—	DF	FRA	Dominique Bathenay (captain)
—	DF	FRA	Éric Renaut
—	DF	FRA	Thierry Morin
—	DF	FRA	Didier Toffolo
—	DF	FRA	Jean-Marc Pilorget
—	DF	FRA	Philippe Col
—	DF	FRA	Antoine Garceran
—	MF	FRA	Jean-Claude Lemoult
—	MF	FRA	Luis Fernandez

No.	Pos.	Nation	Player
—	MF	ALG	Mustapha Dahleb
—	MF	BRA	Abel Braga
—	MF	FRA	Jean-Noël Huck
—	FW	FRA	François Brisson
—	FW	FRA	Dominique Rocheteau
—	FW	CHA	Nambatingue Toko
—	FW	SEN	Boubacar Sarr
—	FW	FRA	Jean-François Beltramini
—	FW	FRA	Bernard Bureau

=== Out on loan ===
Players who were loaned out to other clubs during the season.

Note: Flags indicate national team as defined under FIFA eligibility rules; some limited exceptions apply. Players may hold more than one non-FIFA nationality.

No.	Pos.	Nation	Player
—	DF	FRA	Franck Tanasi (at Paris FC)
—	MF	FRA	Gilles Cardinet (at Brest)

No.	Pos.	Nation	Player
—	MF	ITA	Armando Bianchi (at Nîmes)

== Transfers ==
=== Arrivals ===
Players who signed for the club.

Note: Flags indicate national team as defined under FIFA eligibility rules; some limited exceptions apply. Players may hold more than one non-FIFA nationality.

No.	Pos.	Nation	Player
—	FW	FRA	François Brisson (from Laval, end of loan)
—	FW	CHA	Nambatingue Toko (from Valenciennes)

No.	Pos.	Nation	Player
—	FW	FRA	Dominique Rocheteau (from Saint-Étienne)

=== Departures ===
Players who left the club.

Note: Flags indicate national team as defined under FIFA eligibility rules; some limited exceptions apply. Players may hold more than one non-FIFA nationality.

No.	Pos.	Nation	Player
—	GK	FRA	Michel Bensoussan (to Rouen)
—	DF	FRA	Pierre Bajoc (Le Mans)
—	DF	FRA	Bernard Caron (to Rouen)

No.	Pos.	Nation	Player
—	DF	FRA	Patrick Grappin (to Poissy)
—	MF	POR	João Alves (to Benfica)

== Kits ==
RTL was the shirt sponsor, and Le Coq Sportif was the kit supplier.

Home	Away

== Competitions ==
=== Overview ===
Competition	First match	Last match	Starting round	Final position	Record							
Competition	First match	Last match	Starting round	Final position	Pld	W	D	L	GF	GA	GD	Win %
Ligue 1	24 July 1980	2 June 1981	Matchday 1	5th	38	17	12	9	62	50	+12	44.74
Coupe de France	14 February 1981	11 March 1981	Round of 64	Round of 32	3	2	0	1	7	5	+2	66.67
Total					41	19	12	10	69	55	+14	46.34

Source: Competitions

=== Ligue 1 ===
==== League table ====
Pos	Team	Pld	W	D	L	GF	GA	GD	Pts	Qualification or relegation
3	Bordeaux	38	18	13	7	57	34	+23	49	Qualification to UEFA Cup first round
4	Monaco	38	19	11	8	58	41	+17	49	Qualification to UEFA Cup first round
5	Paris Saint-Germain	38	17	12	9	62	50	+12	46	
6	Lyon	38	14	13	11	70	54	+16	41	
7	Strasbourg	38	14	12	12	44	47	−3	40	

Source: Histoire du PSG
Rules for classification: 1) points; 2) goal difference; 3) number of goals scored.
Victory: 2 points, Draw: 1 point, Defeat: 0 points

==== Results by round ====
Round	1	2	3	4	5	6	7	8	9	10	11	12	13	14	15	16	17	18	19	20	21	22	23	24	25	26	27	28	29	30	31	32	33	34	35	36	37	38
Ground	A	H	A	A	H	A	H	A	H	A	H	A	H	A	H	A	H	A	H	A	H	H	A	H	A	H	A	H	A	H	A	H	A	H	A	H	A	H
Result	D	W	D	W	W	L	D	D	W	D	W	L	D	W	W	L	W	L	W	L	W	L	L	D	D	L	L	W	D	W	W	W	W	W	D	D	W	D
Position	8	6	6	4	2	5	5	6	5	5	4	6	5	4	4	6	4	4	4	4	4	5	6	6	6	6	6	6	6	6	5	5	5	5	5	5	5	5

Source: Histoire du PSG
A = Away; H = Home; W = Win; D = Draw; L = Loss

==== Matches ====
24 July 1980 1	Angers	1–1	Paris Saint-Germain	Angers
	Berdoll 39'	Report	Bureau 89'	Stadium: Stade Raymond Kopa; Attendance: 9,168; Referee: Claude Bouillet

29 July 1980 2	Paris Saint-Germain	1–0	Strasbourg	Paris
	Toko 35'	Report		Stadium: Parc des Princes; Attendance: 24,943; Referee: Michel Vautrot

5 August 1980 3	Lille	2–2	Paris Saint-Germain	Lille
	Krimau 22'; Olarević 50'	Report	Dahleb 2', 80'	Stadium: Stade Grimonprez-Jooris; Attendance: 17,097; Referee: Robert Wurtz

12 August 1980 4	Auxerre	0–1	Paris Saint-Germain	Auxerre
		Report	Bathenay 44'	Stadium: Stade de l'Abbé-Deschamps; Attendance: 10,246; Referee: Jean-Claude Bourgeois

19 August 1980 5	Paris Saint-Germain	3–2	Valenciennes	Paris
	Toko 3', 22'; Dahleb 67'	Report	Pesin 16', 80'	Stadium: Parc des Princes; Attendance: 20,847; Referee: Marcel Bacou

22 August 1980 6	Monaco	4–0	Paris Saint-Germain	Monaco
	Petit 50', 74'; Ricort 67'; Trossero 69'	Report		Stadium: Stade Louis II; Attendance: 9,332; Referee: Gérard Biguet

26 August 1980 7	Paris Saint-Germain	1–1	Metz	Paris
	Rocheteau 44'	Report	Piette 47'	Stadium: Parc des Princes; Attendance: 20,624; Referee: Georges Konrath

29 August 1980 8	Nantes	1–1	Paris Saint-Germain	Nantes
	Baronchelli 23'	Report	Pilorget 72'	Stadium: Stade Marcel-Saupin; Attendance: 16,391; Referee: Daniel Lambert

9 September 1980 9	Paris Saint-Germain	3–2	Nîmes	Paris
	Bathenay 31' (pen.), 47'; Toko 82'	Report	Luizinho 28', 88'	Stadium: Parc des Princes; Attendance: 14,612; Referee: Michel Vautrot

12 September 1980 10	Nice	1–1	Paris Saint-Germain	Nice
	Zambelli 17'	Report	Renaut 70'	Stadium: Stade du Ray; Attendance: 11,880; Referee: Ottorino Di Bernardo

23 September 1980 11	Paris Saint-Germain	3–2	Laval	Paris
	Abel Braga 50'; Rocheteau 54'; Sarr 74'	Report	Krause 8'; Miton 40'	Stadium: Parc des Princes; Attendance: 18,506; Referee: Alain Delmer

26 September 1980 12	Sochaux	4–0	Paris Saint-Germain	Montbéliard
	Ivezić 23', 40'; Durkalić 25'; Anziani 78'	Report		Stadium: Stade Auguste-Bonal; Attendance: 6,918; Referee: Robert Wurtz

4 October 1980 13	Paris Saint-Germain	1–1	Saint-Étienne	Paris
	Toko 36'	Report	Roussey 16'	Stadium: Parc des Princes; Attendance: 46,629; Referee: Marcel Bacou

14 October 1980 14	Tours	0–2	Paris Saint-Germain	Tours
		Report	Renaut 32'; Rocheteau 34'	Stadium: Stade de la Vallée du Cher; Attendance: 16,691; Referee: Mohamed Benali

17 October 1980 15	Paris Saint-Germain	4–0	Bordeaux	Paris
	Rocheteau 30', 47'; Sarr 34'; Toko 82'	Report		Stadium: Parc des Princes; Attendance: 33,928; Referee: Michel Vautrot

31 October 1980 16	Bastia	2–0	Paris Saint-Germain	Furiani
	Marcialis 3'; Lacuesta 35'	Report		Stadium: Stade Armand-Cesari; Attendance: 2,622; Referee: Alain Delmer

7 November 1980 17	Paris Saint-Germain	2–1	Nancy	Paris
	Sarr 18'; Fernandez 20'	Report	Rouyer 23'	Stadium: Parc des Princes; Attendance: 10,346; Referee: Michel Girard

22 November 1980 19	Paris Saint-Germain	3–0	Lens	Paris
	Pilorget 30'; Bathenay 62'; Sarr 75'	Report		Stadium: Parc des Princes; Attendance: 20,913; Referee: Claude Bouillet

28 November 1980 20	Strasbourg	1–0	Paris Saint-Germain	Strasbourg
	Peretz 82'	Report		Stadium: Stade de la Meinau; Attendance: 8,466; Referee: Marcel Bacou

6 December 1980 21	Paris Saint-Germain	4–1	Lille	Paris
	Rocheteau 36', 58', 67'; Huck 69'	Report	Olarević 56'	Stadium: Parc des Princes; Attendance: 16,090; Referee: Robert Wurtz

14 December 1980 22	Paris Saint-Germain	2–3	Auxerre	Paris
	Toko 16'; Pilorget 75'	Report	Rémy 32'; Szarmach 34'; Cuperly 53'	Stadium: Parc des Princes; Attendance: 22,513; Referee: Michel Dailly

21 December 1980 23	Valenciennes	2–0	Paris Saint-Germain	Valenciennes
	Zaremba 53'; Vésir 58'	Report		Stadium: Stade Nungesser; Attendance: 7,854; Referee: Daniel Lambert

25 January 1981 24	Paris Saint-Germain	0–0	Monaco	Paris
		Report		Stadium: Parc des Princes; Attendance: 27,984; Referee: René Lopez

31 January 1981 25	Metz	0–0	Paris Saint-Germain	Metz
		Report		Stadium: Stade Saint-Symphorien; Attendance: 9,566; Referee: Marcel Bacou

4 February 1981 18	Lyon	2–0	Paris Saint-Germain	Lyon
	Nikolić 12'; Xuereb 69'	Report		Stadium: Stade de Gerland; Attendance: 14,109; Referee: Ottorino Di Bernardo

8 February 1981 26	Paris Saint-Germain	0–2	Nantes	Paris
		Report	Agerbeck 64'; Pécout 90'	Stadium: Parc des Princes; Attendance: 36,208; Referee: Michel Vautrot

22 February 1981 27	Nîmes	2–1	Paris Saint-Germain	Nîmes
	Deledicq 25'; Luizinho 68'	Report	Sarr 50'	Stadium: Stade Jean-Bouin; Attendance: 4,254; Referee: Ottorino Di Bernardo

28 February 1981 28	Paris Saint-Germain	3–1	Nice	Paris
	Toko 18', 70'; Fernandez 21'	Report	Morin 75' (o.g.)	Stadium: Parc des Princes; Attendance: 10,537; Referee: Daniel Lambert

14 March 1981 29	Laval	0–0	Paris Saint-Germain	Laval
		Report		Stadium: Stade Francis Le Basser; Attendance: 7,754; Referee: Robert Wurtz

28 March 1981 30	Paris Saint-Germain	3–2	Sochaux	Paris
	Abel Braga 56' (pen.); Rocheteau 68', 70'	Report	Revelli 26'; Stopyra 54'	Stadium: Parc des Princes; Attendance: 31,714; Referee: Michel Girard

7 April 1981 31	Saint-Étienne	0–2	Paris Saint-Germain	Saint-Étienne
		Report	Toko 50'; Dahleb 68'	Stadium: Stade Geoffroy-Guichard; Attendance: 21,166; Referee: Marcel Bacou

15 April 1981 32	Paris Saint-Germain	4–1	Tours	Paris
	Sarr 19'; Dahleb 27', 51'; Brulez 90' (o.g.)	Report	Onnis 89'	Stadium: Parc des Princes; Attendance: 23,457; Referee: Georges Konrath

21 April 1981 33	Bordeaux	1–3	Paris Saint-Germain	Bordeaux
	Gemmrich 20' (pen.)	Report	Rocheteau 16', 63'; Trésor 83' (o.g.)	Stadium: Stade Chaban-Delmas; Attendance: 12,432; Referee: René Lopez

5 May 1981 34	Paris Saint-Germain	3–1	Bastia	Paris
	Fernandez 32'; Sarr 65'; Rocheteau 74'	Report	Mariini 77'	Stadium: Parc des Princes; Attendance: 23,868; Referee: Jacques Ferrary

12 May 1981 35	Nancy	2–2	Paris Saint-Germain	Tomblaine
	Perdrieau 25'; Zénier 63' (pen.)	Report	Abel Braga 5', 20'	Stadium: Stade Marcel Picot; Attendance: 7,000; Referee: Marcel Pignol

22 May 1981 36	Paris Saint-Germain	1–1	Lyon	Paris
	Rocheteau 60'	Report	Nikolić 6'	Stadium: Parc des Princes; Attendance: 21,150; Referee: Mohamed Benali

29 May 1981 37	Lens	2–3	Paris Saint-Germain	Lens
	Ehrlacher 26', 51'	Report	Sarr 40', 68'; Rocheteau 56'	Stadium: Stade Bollaert-Delelis; Attendance: 10,060; Referee: Robert Wurtz

2 June 1981 38	Paris Saint-Germain	2–2	Angers	Paris
	Sarr 50' (pen.); Rocheteau 79'	Report	Lecornu 5'; Berdoll 77'	Stadium: Parc des Princes; Attendance: 11,535; Referee: Alain Delmer

=== Coupe de France ===
==== Round of 64 ====
14 February 1981 Single leg	Paris Saint-Germain	2–0	Rennes	Caen
	Abel Braga 50'; Rocheteau 62'	Report		Stadium: Stade de Venoix; Attendance: 8,507; Referee: Gérard Biguet

==== Round of 32 ====
7 March 1981 First leg	Nantes	2–0	Paris Saint-Germain	Nantes
	Baronchelli 6'; Touré 85'	Report		Stadium: Stade Marcel-Saupin; Attendance: 14,905; Referee: Mohamed Benali

11 March 1981 Second leg	Paris Saint-Germain	5–3 (5–5 (a) agg.)	Nantes	Paris
	Toko 8', 24', 67'; Sarr 15'; Rocheteau 57'	Report	Rampillon 31'; Trossero 43'; Agerbeck 62'	Stadium: Parc des Princes; Attendance: 42,016; Referee: Georges Konrath

== Statistics ==
=== Appearances and goals ===
19 players featured in at least one official match, and the club scored 69 goals in official competitions, including two own goals.

Rank	Player	Position	Appearances	Goals	Source
1	(France) Dominique Baratelli	GK	41	0	
2	(France) Dominique Rocheteau	FW	40	18	
3	(Chad) Nambatingue Toko	FW	39	13	
4	(France) Jean-Marc Pilorget	DF	37	3	
5	(France) Dominique Bathenay	DF	35	4	
6	(France) Luis Fernandez	MF	34	3	
7	(France) Jean-Noël Huck	MF	33	1	
8	(Senegal) Boubacar Sarr	FW	31	11	
9	(Brazil) Abel Braga	MF	30	5	
10	(France) Éric Renaut	DF	27	2	
11	(France) Antoine Garceran	DF	26	0	
12	(Algeria) Mustapha Dahleb	MF	22	6	
13	(France) Thierry Morin	DF	21	0	
14	(France) François Brisson	FW	17	0	
15	(France) Philippe Col	DF	13	0	
16	(France) Jean-Claude Lemoult	MF	13	0	
17	(France) Didier Toffolo	DF	7	0	
18	(France) Bernard Bureau	FW	4	1	
19	(France) Jean-François Beltramini	FW	4	0	
