= 1979–80 Paris Saint-Germain FC season =

10th season of Paris Saint-Germain FC

Paris Saint-Germain
1979–80 season
- President: Francis Borelli
- Manager: Velibor Vasović; Camille Choquier; Georges Peyroche
- Stadium: Parc des Princes
- Ligue 1: 7th
- Coupe de France: Round of 32
- Top goalscorer: League: Jean-François Beltramini (13); All: Jean-François Beltramini (14)
- Average home league attendance: 21,380
Home colours	Away colours

The 1979–80 season was the 10th season in the history of Paris Saint-Germain FC. PSG played their home league matches at the Parc des Princes, attracting an average of 21,380 spectators per match. The club's president was Francis Borelli. The team was managed by Velibor Vasović until October 1979, when Camille Choquier took charge for the remainder of that month. Georges Peyroche was appointed as the new manager in November 1979. Dominique Bathenay served as captain. PSG finished seventh in Ligue 1 and reached the round of 32 in the Coupe de France. Jean-François Beltramini was the team's top scorer, netting 14 goals in all competitions, including 13 in the league.

== Players ==
=== Squad ===
Players who featured in at least one official match for the club.

Note: Flags indicate national team as defined under FIFA eligibility rules; some limited exceptions apply. Players may hold more than one non-FIFA nationality.

No.	Pos.	Nation	Player
—	GK	FRA	Dominique Baratelli
—	DF	FRA	Dominique Bathenay (captain)
—	DF	FRA	Bernard Caron
—	DF	FRA	Pierre Bajoc
—	DF	FRA	Éric Renaut
—	DF	FRA	Thierry Morin
—	DF	FRA	Didier Toffolo
—	DF	FRA	Jean-Marc Pilorget
—	DF	FRA	Patrick Grappin
—	DF	FRA	Philippe Col
—	DF	FRA	Antoine Garceran

No.	Pos.	Nation	Player
—	MF	FRA	Jean-Claude Lemoult
—	MF	FRA	Luis Fernandez
—	MF	POR	João Alves
—	MF	ALG	Mustapha Dahleb
—	MF	BRA	Abel Braga
—	MF	FRA	Jean-Noël Huck
—	MF	ITA	Armando Bianchi
—	MF	FRA	Gilles Cardinet
—	FW	SEN	Boubacar Sarr
—	FW	FRA	Jean-François Beltramini
—	FW	FRA	Bernard Bureau

=== Out on loan ===
Players who were loaned out to other clubs during the season.

Note: Flags indicate national team as defined under FIFA eligibility rules; some limited exceptions apply. Players may hold more than one non-FIFA nationality.

No. / Pos. / Nation / Player; — / DF / FRA / Franck Tanasi (at Paris FC)	No. / Pos. / Nation / Player; — / FW / FRA / François Brisson (at Laval)

== Transfers ==
=== Arrivals ===
Players who signed for the club.

Note: Flags indicate national team as defined under FIFA eligibility rules; some limited exceptions apply. Players may hold more than one non-FIFA nationality.

No.	Pos.	Nation	Player
—	GK	FRA	Michel Bensoussan (from Paris FC, end of loan)
—	DF	FRA	Bernard Caron (from Paris FC)
—	DF	FRA	Antoine Garceran (from Reims)
—	DF	FRA	Patrick Grappin (from PSG Youth Academy)
—	DF	FRA	Didier Toffolo (from PSG Youth Academy)
—	MF	BRA	Abel Braga (from Vasco da Gama)

No.	Pos.	Nation	Player
—	MF	POR	João Alves (from Benfica)
—	MF	FRA	Gilles Cardinet (from PSG Youth Academy)
—	MF	FRA	Jean-Noël Huck (from Paris FC)
—	MF	FRA	Lionel Justier (from Paris FC, end of loan)
—	FW	FRA	Jean-François Beltramini (from Paris FC)
—	FW	SEN	Boubacar Sarr (from Marseille)

=== Departures ===
Players who left the club.

Note: Flags indicate national team as defined under FIFA eligibility rules; some limited exceptions apply. Players may hold more than one non-FIFA nationality.

No.	Pos.	Nation	Player
—	GK	FRA	Denis Troch (Retired)
—	DF	FRA	Jean-Pierre Adams (to Mulhouse)
—	DF	ARG	Ramón Heredia (Retired)
—	DF	FRA	Philippe Jean (to Paris FC)
—	DF	FRA	Dominique Lokoli (to Nancy)
—	MF	FRA	Jean-François Douis (Retired)
—	MF	FRA	Lionel Justier (to Brest)

No.	Pos.	Nation	Player
—	MF	FRA	Jacques Laposte (Retired)
—	MF	FRA	Jean-Michel Larqué (Retired)
—	FW	ARG	Carlos Bianchi (to Strasbourg)
—	FW	CGO	François M'Pelé (to Lens)
—	FW	FRA	Guy Nosibor (to Rennes)
—	FW	FRA	Mario Mongelli (to Paris FC)
—	FW	FRA	Hervé Porquet (to Fontainebleau)

== Kits ==
RTL was the shirt sponsor, and Le Coq Sportif was the kit supplier.

Home	Away

== Competitions ==
=== Overview ===
Competition	First match	Last match	Starting round	Final position	Record							
Competition	First match	Last match	Starting round	Final position	Pld	W	D	L	GF	GA	GD	Win %
Ligue 1	26 July 1979	27 May 1980	Matchday 1	7th	38	15	10	13	59	52	+7	39.47
Coupe de France	10 February 1980	15 March 1980	Round of 64	Round of 32	3	1	1	1	3	3	+0	33.33
Total					41	16	11	14	62	55	+7	39.02

Source: Competitions

=== Ligue 1 ===
==== League table ====
Pos	Team	Pld	W	D	L	GF	GA	GD	Pts
5	Strasbourg	38	17	9	12	58	50	+8	43
6	Bordeaux	38	16	8	14	64	53	+11	40
7	Paris Saint-Germain	38	15	10	13	59	52	+7	40
8	Valenciennes	38	14	12	12	47	47	0	40
9	Lens	38	14	10	14	51	51	0	38

Source: Histoire du PSG
Rules for classification: 1) points; 2) goal difference; 3) number of goals scored.
Victory: 2 points, Draw: 1 point, Defeat: 0 points

==== Results by round ====
Round	1	2	3	4	5	6	7	8	9	10	11	12	13	14	15	16	17	18	19	20	21	22	23	24	25	26	27	28	29	30	31	32	33	34	35	36	37	38
Ground	A	H	A	H	A	H	A	A	H	A	H	A	H	A	H	A	H	A	H	A	H	A	H	A	H	H	A	H	A	H	A	H	A	H	A	H	A	H
Result	D	W	L	W	D	D	L	D	L	L	D	L	W	W	W	W	D	L	W	W	W	L	W	W	W	W	L	D	L	W	D	D	L	L	L	D	L	W
Position	10	7	11	8	9	8	9	10	11	14	14	15	14	11	9	8	9	12	10	5	5	6	5	5	5	5	5	5	5	5	5	5	5	7	8	8	8	7

Source: Histoire du PSG
A = Away; H = Home; W = Win; D = Draw; L = Loss

==== Matches ====
26 July 1979 1	Lyon	1–1	Paris Saint-Germain	Lyon
	Müller 81'	Report	Renaut 89'	Stadium: Stade de Gerland; Attendance: 14,891; Referee: Achille Verbecke

3 August 1979 2	Paris Saint-Germain	2–1	Marseille	Paris
	Abel Braga 54'; Bathenay 70'	Report	Six 11'	Stadium: Parc des Princes; Attendance: 43,845; Referee: Daniel Lambert

10 August 1979 3	Sochaux	1–0	Paris Saint-Germain	Montbéliard
	Benoit 81'	Report		Stadium: Stade Auguste-Bonal; Attendance: 7,834; Referee: Jean-Marie Meeus

17 August 1979 4	Paris Saint-Germain	3–1	Laval	Paris
	Sarr 7', 75'; Bureau 60'	Report	Kostedde 55'	Stadium: Parc des Princes; Attendance: 14,979; Referee: Mohamed Benali

24 August 1979 5	Monaco	2–2	Paris Saint-Germain	Monaco
	Onnis 30', 76'	Report	Bureau 45'; Sarr 70'	Stadium: Stade Louis II; Attendance: 9,030; Referee: Alain Delmer

28 August 1979 6	Paris Saint-Germain	0–0	Brest	Paris
		Report		Stadium: Parc des Princes; Attendance: 18,808; Referee: Georges Konrath

11 September 1979 7	Nantes	4–2	Paris Saint-Germain	Nantes
	Rio 8'; Trossero 24', 62'; Amisse 67'	Report	Bathenay 74'; Sarr 85'	Stadium: Stade Marcel-Saupin; Attendance: 16,076; Referee: Jean-Claude Martin

14 September 1979 8	Lens	1–1	Paris Saint-Germain	Lens
	Sab 9'	Report	Bureau 70'	Stadium: Stade Bollaert-Delelis; Attendance: 15,455; Referee: Claude Bouillet

22 September 1979 9	Paris Saint-Germain	1–2	Nancy	Paris
	Bianchi 60' (pen.)	Report	Paco Rubio 37' (pen.), 44'	Stadium: Parc des Princes; Attendance: 13,837; Referee: Achille Verbecke

28 September 1979 10	Saint-Étienne	2–0	Paris Saint-Germain	Saint-Étienne
	Lopez 42'; Janvion 68'	Report		Stadium: Stade Geoffroy-Guichard; Attendance: 17,753; Referee: Jacques Ferrary

6 October 1979 11	Paris Saint-Germain	2–2	Nice	Paris
	Bianchi 21'; Beltramini 60'	Report	Bocchi 20'; Bjeković 59'	Stadium: Parc des Princes; Attendance: 9,832; Referee: Gérard Biguet

13 October 1979 12	Nîmes	2–0	Paris Saint-Germain	Nîmes
	Marguerite 3'; Girard 15'	Report		Stadium: Stade Jean-Bouin; Attendance: 5,583; Referee: Michel Dailly

19 October 1979 13	Paris Saint-Germain	3–0	Valenciennes	Paris
	Fernandez 46'; Beltramini 56', 68'	Report		Stadium: Parc des Princes; Attendance: 10,509; Referee: Michel Vautrot

30 October 1979 14	Angers	1–2	Paris Saint-Germain	Angers
	Lecornu 85'	Report	Renaut 27'; Sarr 78'	Stadium: Stade Raymond Kopa; Attendance: 6,035; Referee: Ottorino Di Bernardo

2 November 1979 15	Paris Saint-Germain	1–0	Strasbourg	Paris
	Beltramini 41'	Report		Stadium: Parc des Princes; Attendance: 36,085; Referee: Jacques Ferrary

10 November 1979 16	Bordeaux	0–1	Paris Saint-Germain	Bordeaux
		Report	Sarr 73'	Stadium: Stade Chaban-Delmas; Attendance: 9,308; Referee: Robert Wurtz

21 November 1979 17	Paris Saint-Germain	1–1	Bastia	Paris
	Abel Braga 60' (pen.)	Report	Ihily 29'	Stadium: Parc des Princes; Attendance: 15,582; Referee: Claude Bouillet

24 November 1979 18	Lille	4–2	Paris Saint-Germain	Lille
	Pleimelding 28'; Delemer 65'; Henry 79'; Cabral 88'	Report	Sarr 16'; Beltramini 43'	Stadium: Stade Grimonprez-Jooris; Attendance: 8,676; Referee: Michel Dailly

2 December 1979 19	Paris Saint-Germain	2–0	Metz	Paris
	Beltramini 57'; Col 78'	Report		Stadium: Parc des Princes; Attendance: 11,981; Referee: Jean-Claude Martin

8 December 1979 20	Marseille	0–2	Paris Saint-Germain	Marseille
		Report	Sarr 46'; Beltramini 88'	Stadium: Stade Vélodrome; Attendance: 5,556; Referee: Michel Vautrot

16 December 1979 21	Paris Saint-Germain	3–1	Sochaux	Paris
	Renaut 63'; Bathenay 69'; Sarr 88'	Report	Genghini 10'	Stadium: Parc des Princes; Attendance: 29,908; Referee: René Lopez

19 January 1980 22	Laval	3–1	Paris Saint-Germain	Laval
	Brisson 45'; Pérais 59'; Kostedde 75' (pen.)	Report	Sarr 72'	Stadium: Stade Francis Le Basser; Attendance: 6,049; Referee: Alain Delmer

27 January 1980 23	Paris Saint-Germain	2–1	Monaco	Paris
	Sarr 38', 72'	Report	Emon 21'	Stadium: Parc des Princes; Attendance: 38,002; Referee: Ottorino Di Bernardo

2 February 1980 24	Brest	0–4	Paris Saint-Germain	Brest
		Report	Dahleb 19'; Beltramini 23'; Cardinet 35'; Bathenay 44'	Stadium: Stade Francis-Le Blé; Attendance: 7,786; Referee: Jean-Claude Martin

17 February 1980 25	Paris Saint-Germain	1–0	Nantes	Paris
	Ayache 7' (o.g.)	Report		Stadium: Parc des Princes; Attendance: 42,236; Referee: René Vigliani

24 February 1980 26	Paris Saint-Germain	3–0	Lens	Paris
	Dahleb 24', 49'; Beltramini 64'	Report		Stadium: Parc des Princes; Attendance: 24,805; Referee: Jacques Ferrary

1 March 1980 27	Nancy	3–2	Paris Saint-Germain	Tomblaine
	Umpiérrez 1'; Jeannol 8', 48'	Report	Bathenay 30' (pen.); Dahleb 88'	Stadium: Stade Marcel Picot; Attendance: 8,472; Referee: Jean-Claude Martin

12 March 1980 28	Paris Saint-Germain	2–2	Saint-Étienne	Paris
	Dahleb 61'; Renaut 76'	Report	Rocheteau 5'; Elie 38'	Stadium: Parc des Princes; Attendance: 46,305; Referee: Robert Wurtz

22 March 1980 29	Nice	3–0	Paris Saint-Germain	Nice
	Bousdira 14'; Bjeković 16', 26'	Report		Stadium: Stade du Ray; Attendance: 5,376; Referee: Marcel Bacou

29 March 1980 30	Paris Saint-Germain	4–0	Nîmes	Paris
	Abel Braga 42'; Beltramini 50', 67'; Bathenay 60' (pen.)	Report		Stadium: Parc des Princes; Attendance: 10,268; Referee: Daniel Lambert

2 April 1980 31	Valenciennes	1–1	Paris Saint-Germain	Valenciennes
	Jacques 82'	Report	Dahleb 69'	Stadium: Stade Nungesser; Attendance: 6,343; Referee: Michel Dailly

8 April 1980 32	Paris Saint-Germain	1–1	Angers	Paris
	Abel Braga 23'	Report	Félix 32'	Stadium: Parc des Princes; Attendance: 9,817; Referee: Ottorino Di Bernardo

18 April 1980 33	Strasbourg	2–1	Paris Saint-Germain	Strasbourg
	Marx 7'; Gentes 58'	Report	Pilorget 78'	Stadium: Stade de la Meinau; Attendance: 10,193; Referee: Achille Verbecke

25 April 1980 34	Paris Saint-Germain	0–1	Bordeaux	Paris
		Report	Lacuesta 30'	Stadium: Parc des Princes; Attendance: 15,490; Referee: Alain Delmer

2 May 1980 35	Bastia	1–0	Paris Saint-Germain	Furiani
	Verstraete 59'	Report		Stadium: Stade Armand-Cesari; Attendance: 2,864; Referee: Marcel Bacou

6 May 1980 36	Paris Saint-Germain	2–2	Lille	Paris
	Abel Braga 15'; Beltramini 42'	Report	Pleimelding 20'; Simon 50'	Stadium: Parc des Princes; Attendance: 9,419; Referee: Michel Vautrot

17 May 1980 37	Metz	5–2	Paris Saint-Germain	Metz
	Hinschberger 17'; Synaeghel 80'; Battiston 83', 90' (pen.); Fernandez 87' (o.g.)	Report	Fernandez 30'; Beltramini 89'	Stadium: Stade Saint-Symphorien; Attendance: 8,262; Referee: Jean-Claude Martin

27 May 1980 38	Paris Saint-Germain	2–1	Lyon	Paris
	Bureau 65', 90'	Report	Lemoult 33' (o.g.)	Stadium: Parc des Princes; Attendance: 4,520; Referee: Robert Wurtz

=== Coupe de France ===
==== Round of 64 ====
10 February 1980 Single leg	Paris Saint-Germain	2–0	AFC Creil	Montataire
	Beltramini 36'; Bathenay 77'	Report		Stadium: Stade Marcel-Coene; Attendance: 6,247; Referee: Alain Delmer

==== Round of 32 ====
8 March 1980 First leg	Paris Saint-Germain	0–2	Lens	Paris
		Report	M'Pelé 5'; Leclercq 61'	Stadium: Parc des Princes; Attendance: 19,661; Referee: Georges Konrath

15 March 1980 Second leg	Lens	1–1 (3–1 agg.)	Paris Saint-Germain	Lens
	Lacombe 73'	Report	Huck 77'	Stadium: Stade Bollaert-Delelis; Attendance: 31,893; Referee: René Vigliani

== Statistics ==
=== Appearances and goals ===
22 players featured in at least one official match, and the club scored 62 goals in official competitions, including one own goal.

Rank	Player	Position	Appearances	Goals	Source
1	(France) Dominique Baratelli	GK	41	0	
2	(France) Dominique Bathenay	DF	40	7	
3	(France) Jean-Claude Lemoult	MF	37	0	
4	(France) Éric Renaut	DF	35	4	
5	(France) Jean-François Beltramini	FW	32	14	
6	(France) Jean-Noël Huck	MF	31	1	
7	(Algeria) Mustapha Dahleb	MF	30	6	
8	(France) Jean-Marc Pilorget	DF	30	1	
9	(France) Thierry Morin	DF	28	0	
10	(France) Philippe Col	DF	26	1	
11	(France) Bernard Bureau	FW	23	5	
12	(Senegal) Boubacar Sarr	FW	22	12	
13	(Portugal) João Alves	MF	22	0	
14	(France) Luis Fernandez	MF	17	2	
15	(Brazil) Abel Braga	MF	16	5	
16	(Italy) Armando Bianchi	MF	15	2	
17	(France) Antoine Garceran	DF	12	0	
18	(France) Gilles Cardinet	MF	11	1	
19	(France) Didier Toffolo	DF	9	0	
20	(France) Bernard Caron	DF	7	0	
21	(France) Pierre Bajoc	DF	1	0	
22	(France) Patrick Grappin	DF	1	0	
