= 1982–83 Paris Saint-Germain FC season =

13th season of Paris Saint-Germain

Paris Saint-Germain
1982–83 season
- President: Francis Borelli
- Manager: Georges Peyroche
- Stadium: Parc des Princes
- Ligue 1: 3rd
- Coupe de France: Winners
- UEFA Cup Winners' Cup: Quarter-finals
- Top goalscorer: League: Kees Kist (12); All: Kees Kist (18)
- Average home league attendance: 24,420
Home colours	Away colours	Third colours

The 1982–83 season was the 13th season in the history of Paris Saint-Germain FC. PSG played their home league matches at the Parc des Princes, attracting an average of 24,420 spectators per match. The club's president was Francis Borelli, and the team was managed by Georges Peyroche, with Dominique Bathenay serving as captain. PSG finished third in Ligue 1, won the Coupe de France, and reached the quarter-finals of the UEFA Cup Winners' Cup. Kees Kist was the team's top scorer, netting 18 goals in all competitions, including 12 in the league.

== Players ==
=== Squad ===
Players who featured in at least one official match for the club.

Note: Flags indicate national team as defined under FIFA eligibility rules; some limited exceptions apply. Players may hold more than one non-FIFA nationality.

No.	Pos.	Nation	Player
—	GK	FRA	Dominique Baratelli
—	DF	FRA	Dominique Bathenay (captain)
—	DF	FRA	Pascal Zaremba
—	DF	FRA	Yannick Guillochon
—	DF	FRA	Thierry Morin
—	DF	FRA	Didier Toffolo
—	DF	FRA	Jean-Marc Pilorget
—	DF	FRA	Philippe Col
—	DF	FRA	Franck Tanasi
—	DF	FRA	Thierry Bacconnier

No.	Pos.	Nation	Player
—	MF	FRA	Jean-Claude Lemoult
—	MF	FRA	Luis Fernandez
—	MF	ARG	Osvaldo Ardiles
—	MF	ALG	Mustapha Dahleb
—	MF	YUG	Safet Sušić
—	FW	NED	Kees Kist
—	FW	FRA	Dominique Rocheteau
—	FW	CHA	Nambatingue Toko
—	FW	SEN	Boubacar Sarr
—	FW	FRA	Michel N'Gom

=== Out on loan ===
Players who were loaned out to other clubs during the season.

Note: Flags indicate national team as defined under FIFA eligibility rules; some limited exceptions apply. Players may hold more than one non-FIFA nationality.

No. / Pos. / Nation / Player; — / MF / FRA / Gilles Cardinet (at Brest)	No. / Pos. / Nation / Player; — / FW / FRA / Alain Préfaci (at Thonon)

== Transfers ==
=== Arrivals ===
Players who signed for the club.

Note: Flags indicate national team as defined under FIFA eligibility rules; some limited exceptions apply. Players may hold more than one non-FIFA nationality.

No.	Pos.	Nation	Player
—	DF	FRA	Thierry Bacconnier (from PSG Youth Academy)
—	DF	FRA	Yannick Guillochon (from PSG Youth Academy)
—	DF	FRA	Franck Tanasi (from Orléans, end of loan)
—	DF	FRA	Pascal Zaremba (from Valenciennes)

No.	Pos.	Nation	Player
—	MF	ARG	Osvaldo Ardiles (on loan from Tottenham Hotspur)
—	MF	YUG	Safet Sušić (from Sarajevo)
—	FW	FRA	Bernard Bureau (from Brest, end of loan)
—	FW	NED	Kees Kist (from AZ Alkmaar)

=== Departures ===
Players who left the club.

Note: Flags indicate national team as defined under FIFA eligibility rules; some limited exceptions apply. Players may hold more than one non-FIFA nationality.

No.	Pos.	Nation	Player
—	DF	FRA	Raymond Domenech (to Bordeaux)
—	DF	FRA	Éric Renaut (to Racing CF)
—	MF	ARG	Osvaldo Ardiles (to Tottenham Hotspur, end of loan)

No.	Pos.	Nation	Player
—	FW	FRA	Bernard Bureau (to Brest)
—	FW	FRA	Daniel Sanchez (to Mulhouse)
—	FW	YUG	Ivica Šurjak (to Udinese)

== Kits ==
RTL was the shirt sponsor, and Le Coq Sportif was the kit supplier.

Home	Away	Third

== Competitions ==
=== Overview ===
Competition	First match	Last match	Starting round	Final position	Record							
Competition	First match	Last match	Starting round	Final position	Pld	W	D	L	GF	GA	GD	Win %
Ligue 1	10 August 1982	3 June 1983	Matchday 1	3rd	38	20	7	11	66	49	+17	52.63
Coupe de France	12 February 1983	11 June 1983	Round of 64	Winners	10	7	1	2	24	10	+14	70.00
UEFA Cup Winners' Cup	15 September 1982	16 March 1983	First round	Quarter-finals	6	4	0	2	10	5	+5	66.67
Total					54	31	8	15	100	64	+36	57.41

Source: Competitions

=== Ligue 1 ===
==== League table ====
Pos	Team	Pld	W	D	L	GF	GA	GD	Pts	Qualification or relegation
1	Nantes (C)	38	24	10	4	77	29	+48	58	Qualification to European Cup first round
2	Bordeaux	38	20	8	10	67	48	+19	48	Qualification to UEFA Cup first round
3	Paris Saint-Germain	38	20	7	11	66	49	+17	47	Qualification to Cup Winners' Cup first round (Note: Paris Saint-Germain qualified for the 1983–84 European Cup Winners' Cup as winners of the 1982–83 Coupe de France.)
4	Lens	38	18	8	12	64	55	+9	44	Qualification to UEFA Cup first round
5	Laval	38	15	14	9	42	41	+1	44	Qualification to UEFA Cup first round

Source: Histoire du PSG
Rules for classification: 1) points; 2) goal difference; 3) number of goals scored.
Victory: 2 points, Draw: 1 point, Defeat: 0 points
(C) Champions

==== Results by round ====
Round	1	2	3	4	5	6	7	8	9	10	11	12	13	14	15	16	17	18	19	20	21	22	23	24	25	26	27	28	29	30	31	32	33	34	35	36	37	38
Ground	H	A	H	A	H	A	H	A	H	H	A	H	A	H	A	H	A	H	A	H	A	H	A	H	A	H	A	A	H	A	H	A	H	A	H	A	H	A
Result	W	D	L	D	W	L	W	L	W	W	L	W	W	D	L	W	W	D	L	L	W	W	L	W	D	W	D	W	W	D	W	L	W	L	W	L	W	W
Position	8	7	11	9	7	13	7	7	6	5	8	6	4	4	5	4	4	4	4	7	6	4	5	4	3	3	3	3	3	3	3	3	3	3	3	3	3	3

Source: Histoire du PSG
A = Away; H = Home; W = Win; D = Draw; L = Loss

==== Matches ====
10 August 1982 1	Paris Saint-Germain	1–0	Rouen	Paris
	Fernandez 33'	Report		Stadium: Parc des Princes; Attendance: 20,275; Referee: Gérard Biguet

17 August 1982 2	Monaco	1–1	Paris Saint-Germain	Monaco
	Bijotat 5'	Report	Morin 30'	Stadium: Stade Louis II; Attendance: 10,150; Referee: Georges Konrath

24 August 1982 3	Paris Saint-Germain	2–3	Nancy	Paris
	Bathenay 25' (pen.); Fernandez 86'	Report	Philippe 52', 78'; Paco Rubio 75'	Stadium: Parc des Princes; Attendance: 27,297; Referee: Jacques Ferrary

27 August 1982 4	Saint-Étienne	1–1	Paris Saint-Germain	Saint-Étienne
	Zanon 36'	Report	Bathenay 78'	Stadium: Stade Geoffroy-Guichard; Attendance: 25,155; Referee: Claude Bouillet

3 September 1982 5	Paris Saint-Germain	2–1	Nantes	Paris
	Kist 54'; Bathenay 90' (pen.)	Report	Picot 78'	Stadium: Parc des Princes; Attendance: 40,809; Referee: Daniel Lambert

10 September 1982 6	Lens	4–0	Paris Saint-Germain	Lens
	Vercruysse 15', 45'; Brisson 43' (pen.); Fernandez 55' (o.g.)	Report		Stadium: Stade Bollaert-Delelis; Attendance: 29,053; Referee: Michel Girard

21 September 1982 7	Paris Saint-Germain	5–1	Mulhouse	Paris
	Zaremba 54'; Guillochon 61'; Kist 63', 68', 76'	Report	Wagner 53'	Stadium: Parc des Princes; Attendance: 16,953; Referee: Alain Delmer

24 September 1982 8	Bordeaux	2–1	Paris Saint-Germain	Bordeaux
	Lacombe 53', 90'	Report	Toko 51'	Stadium: Stade Chaban-Delmas; Attendance: 20,126; Referee: Gérard Biguet

2 October 1982 9	Paris Saint-Germain	1–0	Bastia	Paris
	N'Gom 33'	Report		Stadium: Parc des Princes; Attendance: 21,153; Referee: Jean-Louis Rideau

12 October 1982 10	Paris Saint-Germain	1–0	Sochaux	Paris
	Fernandez 90'	Report		Stadium: Parc des Princes; Attendance: 16,581; Referee: Marcel Bacou

15 October 1982 11	Brest	3–1	Paris Saint-Germain	Brest
	Pardo 13'; Bureau 52'; Vabec 80'	Report	Kist 63' (pen.)	Stadium: Stade Francis-Le Blé; Attendance: 14,501; Referee: Ottorino Di Bernardo

26 October 1982 12	Paris Saint-Germain	4–3	Strasbourg	Paris
	Jodar 4' (o.g.); Ardiles 10'; Kist 21', 56'	Report	Betancourt 53'; Glassmann 68'; Nielsen 80'	Stadium: Parc des Princes; Attendance: 18,381; Referee: Gérard Biguet

29 October 1982 13	Lyon	1–3	Paris Saint-Germain	Lyon
	Pilorget 12' (o.g.)	Report	Dahleb 28', 44'; Toko 86'	Stadium: Stade de Gerland; Attendance: 13,256; Referee: Robert Wurtz

6 November 1982 14	Paris Saint-Germain	0–0	Laval	Paris
		Report		Stadium: Parc des Princes; Attendance: 23,331; Referee: Michel Dailly

16 November 1982 15	Lille	1–0	Paris Saint-Germain	Lille
	Muslin 24' (pen.)	Report		Stadium: Stade Grimonprez-Jooris; Attendance: 9,689; Referee: Claude Bouillet

23 November 1982 16	Paris Saint-Germain	2–1	Toulouse	Paris
	Dahleb 45'; Toko 47'	Report	Laverny 77'	Stadium: Parc des Princes; Attendance: 28,641; Referee: Georges Konrath

27 November 1982 17	Metz	1–2	Paris Saint-Germain	Metz
	Krimau 18'	Report	Zaremba 12'; Rocheteau 36'	Stadium: Stade Saint-Symphorien; Attendance: 9,924; Referee: Marcel Bacou

4 December 1982 18	Paris Saint-Germain	0–0	Auxerre	Paris
		Report		Stadium: Parc des Princes; Attendance: 20,000; Referee: Jean-Claude Boyer

11 December 1982 19	Tours	3–1	Paris Saint-Germain	Tours
	Polaniok 11'; Lacombe 23'; Dehon 46'	Report	Guillochon 80'	Stadium: Stade de la Vallée du Cher; Attendance: 10,100; Referee: Michel Dailly

18 December 1982 20	Paris Saint-Germain	0–1	Monaco	Paris
		Report	Bellone 67'	Stadium: Parc des Princes; Attendance: 24,400; Referee: Gérard Biguet

15 January 1983 21	Nancy	2–3	Paris Saint-Germain	Tomblaine
	Paco Rubio 27', 46' (pen.)	Report	Toko 19', 30'; Sušić 80'	Stadium: Stade Marcel Picot; Attendance: 8,292; Referee: Alain Delmer

22 January 1983 22	Paris Saint-Germain	4–1	Saint-Étienne	Paris
	Toko 18'; Fernandez 46'; Dahleb 56'; Sušić 67'	Report	Janvion 82'	Stadium: Parc des Princes; Attendance: 36,224; Referee: Robert Wurtz

29 January 1983 23	Nantes	2–0	Paris Saint-Germain	Nantes
	Poullain 17'; Touré 55'	Report		Stadium: Stade Marcel-Saupin; Attendance: 20,292; Referee: Georges Konrath

8 February 1983 24	Paris Saint-Germain	4–3	Lens	Paris
	Dahleb 15', 80'; Kist 47'; Sušić 70'	Report	Ogaza 65' (pen.); Xuereb 74', 85'	Stadium: Parc des Princes; Attendance: 34,684; Referee: Jean-Marie Lartigot

20 February 1983 25	Mulhouse	1–1	Paris Saint-Germain	Mulhouse
	Pfertzel 12'	Report	Rocheteau 34'	Stadium: Stade de l'Ill; Attendance: 10,000; Referee: Jacques Ferrary

25 February 1983 26	Paris Saint-Germain	2–0	Bordeaux	Paris
	Lemoult 46'; Fernandez 74'	Report		Stadium: Parc des Princes; Attendance: 40,060; Referee: Michel Vautrot

9 March 1983 27	Bastia	1–1	Paris Saint-Germain	Furiani
	Vernet 89' (pen.)	Report	Toko 5'	Stadium: Stade Armand-Cesari; Attendance: 3,112; Referee: Daniel Lambert

19 March 1983 28	Sochaux	1–2	Paris Saint-Germain	Montbéliard
	Lubin 87'	Report	Kist 73', 75'	Stadium: Stade Auguste-Bonal; Attendance: 6,000; Referee: Michel Girard

29 March 1983 29	Paris Saint-Germain	2–0	Brest	Paris
	Rocheteau 18'; Sušić 84'	Report		Stadium: Parc des Princes; Attendance: 22,150; Referee: Georges Konrath

1 April 1983 30	Strasbourg	1–1	Paris Saint-Germain	Strasbourg
	Vogel 47'	Report	Sušić 48'	Stadium: Stade de la Meinau; Attendance: 7,569; Referee: Jacques Ferrary

8 April 1983 31	Paris Saint-Germain	3–0	Lyon	Paris
	Kist 17', 71'; Rocheteau 89'	Report		Stadium: Parc des Princes; Attendance: 14,505; Referee: Claude Bouillet

19 April 1983 32	Laval	1–0	Paris Saint-Germain	Laval
	Krause 78'	Report		Stadium: Stade Francis Le Basser; Attendance: 11,146; Referee: Gérard Biguet

29 April 1983 33	Paris Saint-Germain	4–1	Lille	Paris
	Rocheteau 4', 43'; Zaremba 6'; Sušić 21'	Report	Verel 84'	Stadium: Parc des Princes; Attendance: 18,000; Referee: Michel Vautrot

6 May 1983 34	Toulouse	2–1	Paris Saint-Germain	Toulouse
	Durand 12'; Ferratge 21'	Report	Rocheteau 53'	Stadium: Stadium de Toulouse; Attendance: 32,689; Referee: Marcel Bacou

13 May 1983 35	Paris Saint-Germain	3–1	Metz	Paris
	Fernandez 41'; Rocheteau 50', 90'	Report	Pilorget 51' (o.g.)	Stadium: Parc des Princes; Attendance: 17,000; Referee: Georges Konrath

20 May 1983 36	Auxerre	3–2	Paris Saint-Germain	Auxerre
	Szarmach 25'; Danio 48'; Barret 87'	Report	Rocheteau 12'; Sušić 61'	Stadium: Stade de l'Abbé-Deschamps; Attendance: 13,233; Referee: Robert Wurtz

24 May 1983 37	Paris Saint-Germain	4–2	Tours	Paris
	N'Gom 23'; Zaremba 45'; Sušić 69'; Rocheteau 70'	Report	Polaniok 35'; Furlan 60'	Stadium: Parc des Princes; Attendance: 23,543; Referee: Claude Bouillet

3 June 1983 38	Rouen	0–1	Paris Saint-Germain	Le Petit-Quevilly
		Report	N'Gom 58'	Stadium: Stade Robert Diochon; Attendance: 19,901; Referee: Mohamed Benali

=== Coupe de France ===
==== Round of 64 ====
12 February 1983 Single leg	Paris Saint-Germain	2–0	Chaumont	Troyes
	Kist 11', 19'	Report		Stadium: Stade de l'Aube; Attendance: 10,000; Referee: Michel Dailly

==== Round of 32 ====
5 March 1983 First leg	Paris Saint-Germain	2–0	Abbeville	Paris
	Kist 75' (pen.); Toko 76'	Report		Stadium: Parc des Princes; Attendance: 10,671; Referee: Jean-Claude Swirog

12 March 1983 Second leg	Abbeville	1–0 (1–2 agg.)	Paris Saint-Germain	Abbeville
	Leboucher 2'	Report		Stadium: Stade Paul-Delique; Attendance: 9,565; Referee: Robert Wurtz

==== Round of 16 ====
5 April 1983 First leg	Strasbourg	0–2	Paris Saint-Germain	Strasbourg
		Report	Rocheteau 40'; Dahleb 58'	Stadium: Stade de la Meinau; Attendance: 6,500; Referee: René Lopez

15 April 1983 Second leg	Paris Saint-Germain	5–2 (7–2 agg.)	Strasbourg	Paris
	Fernandez 16', 82'; Kist 40'; Rocheteau 61', 85'	Report	Vogel 55'; Betancourt 75'	Stadium: Parc des Princes; Attendance: 15,000; Referee: Alain Delmer

==== Quarter-finals ====
3 May 1983 First leg	Brest	2–1	Paris Saint-Germain	Brest
	Maroc 42'; Le Roux 52'	Report	Kist 28'	Stadium: Stade Francis-Le Blé; Attendance: 18,000; Referee: Claude Bouillet

10 May 1983 Second leg	Paris Saint-Germain	2–0 (3–2 agg.)	Brest	Paris
	Toko 38'; Lemoult 66'	Report		Stadium: Parc des Princes; Attendance: 35,000; Referee: Mohamed Benali

==== Semi-finals ====
27 May 1983 First leg	Paris Saint-Germain	4–0	Tours	Paris
	Fernandez 5'; Sušić 9', 84'; Pilorget 33'	Report		Stadium: Parc des Princes; Attendance: 22,000; Referee: Jean-Marie Lartigot

7 June 1983 Second leg	Tours	3–3 (3–7 agg.)	Paris Saint-Germain	Tours
	Lorenzo 5'; Polaniok 35'; Da Fonseca 66'	Report	Sušić 11'; Toko 24'; Sarr 28'	Stadium: Stade de la Vallée du Cher; Attendance: 9,917; Referee: Alain Delmer

==== Final ====
11 June 1983 Final	Paris Saint-Germain	3–2	Nantes	Paris
	Zaremba 3'; Sušić 65'; Toko 82'	Report	Baronchelli 17'; Touré 41'	Stadium: Parc des Princes; Attendance: 46,203; Referee: Michel Vautrot

=== UEFA Cup Winners' Cup ===
==== First round ====
15 September 1982 First leg	Lokomotiv Sofia (Bulgaria)	1–0	(France) Paris Saint-Germain	Sofia, Bulgaria
	Milanov 15'	Report		Stadium: Vasil Levski National Stadium; Attendance: 13,500; Referee: Jan Redelfs (West Germany)

28 September 1982 Second leg	Paris Saint-Germain (France)	5–1 (5–2 agg.)	(Bulgaria) Lokomotiv Sofia	Paris, France
	Toko 20', 81'; Bathenay 66'; N'Gom 85'; Lemoult 89'	Report 1 Report 2	Bogdanov 48'	Stadium: Parc des Princes; Attendance: 30,562; Referee: Horst Brummeier (Austria)

==== Second round ====
20 October 1982 First leg	Swansea City (Wales)	0–1	(France) Paris Saint-Germain	Swansea, Wales
		Report	Toko 71'	Stadium: Vetch Field; Attendance: 9,505; Referee: Ulf Eriksson (Sweden)

3 November 1982 Second leg	Paris Saint-Germain (France)	2–0 (3–0 agg.)	(Wales) Swansea City	Paris, France
	Kist 5'; Fernandez 76'	Report 1 Report 2		Stadium: Parc des Princes; Attendance: 49,179; Referee: Siegfried Kirschen (East Germany)

==== Quarter-finals ====
2 March 1983 First leg	Paris Saint-Germain (France)	2–0	(Belgium) Waterschei Thor	Paris, France
	Fernandez 43'; Pilorget 62'	Report 1 Report 2		Stadium: Parc des Princes; Attendance: 49,575; Referee: Bogdan Dochev (Bulgaria)

16 March 1983 Second leg	Waterschei Thor (Belgium)	3–0 (a.e.t.) (3–2 agg.)	(France) Paris Saint-Germain	Genk, Belgium
	Guðmundsson 30'; R. Janssen 67'; P. Janssen 114'	Report		Stadium: Stade André-Dumont; Attendance: 22,000; Referee: Clive Thomas (Wales)

== Statistics ==
=== Appearances and goals ===
20 players featured in at least one official match, and the club scored 100 goals in official competitions, including one own goal.

Rank	Player	Position	Appearances	Goals	Source
1	(France) Dominique Baratelli	GK	54	0	
2	(France) Jean-Marc Pilorget	DF	52	2	
3	(France) Jean-Claude Lemoult	MF	49	3	
4	(Netherlands) Kees Kist	FW	47	18	
5	(France) Luis Fernandez	MF	46	11	
6	(Chad) Nambatingue Toko	FW	45	13	
7	(France) Dominique Bathenay	DF	43	4	
8	(Algeria) Mustapha Dahleb	MF	41	8	
9	(France) Dominique Rocheteau	FW	38	14	
10	(France) Pascal Zaremba	DF	36	5	
11	(Socialist Federal Republic of Yugoslavia) Safet Sušić	MF	30	12	
12	(France) Philippe Col	DF	30	0	
13	(France) Michel N'Gom	FW	24	4	
14	(France) Yannick Guillochon	DF	24	2	
15	(Senegal) Boubacar Sarr	FW	20	1	
16	(France) Franck Tanasi	DF	20	0	
17	(Argentina) Osvaldo Ardiles	MF	17	1	
18	(France) Didier Toffolo	DF	11	0	
19	(France) Thierry Bacconnier	DF	9	0	
20	(France) Thierry Morin	DF	8	1	
