= 1978 Coupe de France final =

- Event: 1977–78 Coupe de France
Nancy	Nice
1	0
- Date: 13 May 1978
- Venue: Parc des Princes, Paris
- Referee: Achille Verbecke
- Attendance: 45,998

The 1978 Coupe de France final was a football match held at Parc des Princes, Paris on 13 May 1978, that saw AS Nancy defeat OGC Nice 1–0 thanks to a goal by Michel Platini.

== Match details ==
13 May 1978

Nancy	1–0	Nice
Platini 57'

Parc des Princes, Paris
Attendance: 45,998
Referee: Achille Verbecke

GK	1	(France) Jean-Michel Moutier
DF	2	(France) Jacques Perdrieau		(substituted off) 79'
DF	3	(France) Jean-Claude Cloet
DF	4	(France) Pierre Neubert
DF	5	(Uruguay) (France) Carlos Curbelo
MF	6	(France) Philippe Jeannol
MF	7	(France) Olivier Rouyer
MF	8	(France) Bernard Caron
FW	9	(France) Michel Platini	(c)
FW	10	(France) Francisco Rubio
FW	11	(Algeria) Fathi Chebel
Substitutes:
DF		(France) Jean-Pierre Raczynski		(substituted in) 79'
Manager:
(France) Antoine Redin

Assistant Referees:
Fourth Official:

GK	1	(France) Dominique Baratelli
DF	2	(France) Henri Zambelli
DF	3	(France) Dominique Morabito
DF	4	(France) Robert Barraja
DF	5	(Socialist Federal Republic of Yugoslavia) Josip Katalinski
MF	6	(France) Roger Jouve
MF	7	(France) Daniel Sanchez
MF	8	(France) Jean-Noël Huck
FW	10	(France) Jean-Marc Guillou	(c)
FW	9	(Socialist Federal Republic of Yugoslavia) Nenad Bjeković
FW	11	(France) Christian Cappadona		(substituted off) 75'
Substitutes:
FW		(Chad) Nabatingue Toko		(substituted in) 75'
FW		(Nigeria) Benjamin Osaroigwe		(substituted off) 75'
Manager:
(France) Ferenc Kocsur

== See also ==
- 1977–78 Coupe de France
