= List of Paris Saint-Germain FC seasons =

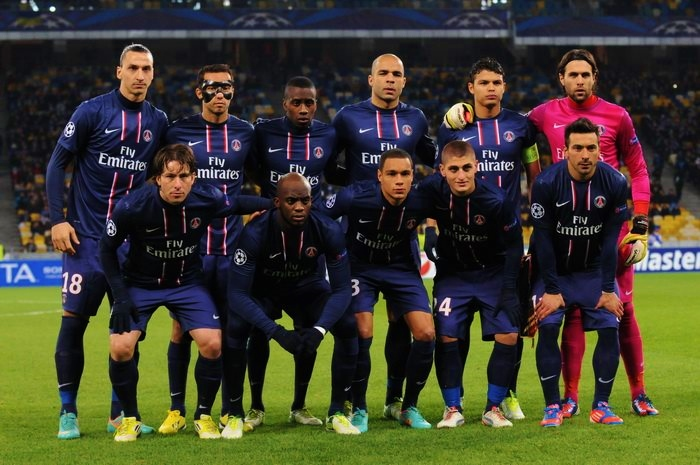
PSG away to Dynamo Kyiv in 2012.

Paris Saint-Germain FC have played 56 seasons, of which 53 have been played in the top division of French football, the Ligue 1. In the remaining three seasons, the club have played twice in the second division, the Ligue 2, and once in the third division, the Division 3. In the 2025–26 season, PSG celebrated their 52nd consecutive Ligue 1 campaign, making them the longest-serving club in the competition. The club played its first competitive match on 23 August 1970, drawing 1–1 away to Poitiers in the opening matchday of Ligue 2. PSG won the Ligue 2 title at the end of the campaign, earning promotion to the top flight. The Parisians made their Ligue 1 debut on 11 August 1971, in a 2–0 away defeat to Angers. Their momentum soon came to a halt and the club split in June 1972, with Paris FC remaining in Ligue 1 and PSG being administratively relegated to Division 3.

After two consecutive promotions, PSG returned to Ligue 1 in the 1974–75 season and never looked back. Since then, the club have won a record 14 league titles, finishing first more often than in any other position. Having finished second in nine league campaigns, PSG have regained the top two places on 22 occasions. They have also reached the top five 30 times, representing more than half of the club's seasons in Ligue 1. PSG's lowest ever finish is 16th, achieved in both the 1971–72 and the 2007–08 seasons, when they escaped relegation on the final day with a 2–1 win at Sochaux.

PSG enjoyed their best season to date in the 2024–25 campaign, winning the continental treble by lifting the UEFA Champions League title, the french league championship and the Coupe de France. They played a record 65 matches, winning 48 of them, and averaged a record attendance of 47,639 per home league game. The club also set several records during the 2015–16 season: PSG collected 96 points, their highest total in Ligue 1, while conceding just 19 goals, and Zlatan Ibrahimović became the player with the most goals scored in a single season, scoring 50. Other notable records across all competitions include the 28 goals conceded in the 1993–94 season and the 171 goals scored in the 2017–18 season.

== Seasons ==
As of 2025–26 season.

Winners Runners-up Promoted Relegated

Season	League		CF	CL	TC	UEFA		FIFA		MP	W	D	L	GF	GA	GD	WP%	Attendance	Top goalscorers																				
Season	1970–71	L2	CF	CL	TC	UEFA		FIFA		MP	W	D	L	GF	GA	GD	WP%	Attendance	Top goalscorers		1st	R64	—N/a	—N/a	—N/a	—N/a	—N/a	—N/a	35	20	12	3	61	29	+32	57.14	3,018	(France) Jacques Rémond	11
1971–72	L1	16th	R64	—N/a	—N/a	—N/a	—N/a	—N/a	—N/a	39	10	10	19	51	68	−17	25.64	10,030	(France) Jean-Claude Bras (France) Michel Prost	12																			
1972–73	D3	2nd	R64	—N/a	—N/a	—N/a	—N/a	—N/a	—N/a	35	20	9	6	80	35	+45	57.14	679	(France) Christian André	27																			
1973–74	L2	2nd	QF	—N/a	—N/a	—N/a	—N/a	—N/a	—N/a	45	26	8	11	93	62	+31	57.78	4,087	(France) Jean-Pierre Dogliani	17																			
1974–75	L1	15th	SF	—N/a	—N/a	—N/a	—N/a	—N/a	—N/a	47	18	14	15	82	74	+8	38.30	17,456	(Republic of the Congo) François M'Pelé	31																			
1975–76	L1	14th	QF	—N/a	—N/a	—N/a	—N/a	—N/a	—N/a	45	16	14	15	76	67	+9	35.56	17,249	(Republic of the Congo) François M'Pelé	18																			
1976–77	L1	9th	R16	—N/a	—N/a	—N/a	—N/a	—N/a	—N/a	43	21	8	14	79	60	+19	48.84	22,700	(Algeria) Mustapha Dahleb	26																			
1977–78	L1	11th	R32	—N/a	—N/a	—N/a	—N/a	—N/a	—N/a	41	15	9	17	81	71	+10	36.59	21,754	(Argentina) Carlos Bianchi	39																			
1978–79	L1	13th	R32	—N/a	—N/a	—N/a	—N/a	—N/a	—N/a	41	15	8	18	67	73	−6	36.59	18,550	(Argentina) Carlos Bianchi	32																			
1979–80	L1	7th	R32	—N/a	—N/a	—N/a	—N/a	—N/a	—N/a	41	16	11	14	62	55	+7	39.02	21,380	(France) Jean-François Beltramini	14																			
1980–81	L1	5th	R32	—N/a	—N/a	—N/a	—N/a	—N/a	—N/a	41	19	12	10	69	55	+14	46.34	22,969	(France) Dominique Rocheteau	18																			
1981–82	L1	7th	W	—N/a	—N/a	—N/a	—N/a	—N/a	—N/a	47	22	12	13	71	51	+20	46.81	24,216	(France) Dominique Rocheteau	16																			
1982–83	L1	3rd	W	—N/a	—N/a	UCWC	QF	—N/a	—N/a	54	31	8	15	100	64	+36	57.41	24,420	(Netherlands) Kees Kist	18																			
1983–84	L1	4th	R64	—N/a	—N/a	UCWC	R2	—N/a	—N/a	43	20	13	10	62	42	+20	46.51	23,968	(France) Michel N'Gom	12																			
1984–85	L1	13th	RU	—N/a	—N/a	UEL	R2	—N/a	—N/a	52	19	10	23	79	88	−9	36.54	16,438	(France) Dominique Rocheteau	20																			
1985–86	L1	1st	SF	—N/a	—N/a	—N/a	—N/a	—N/a	—N/a	47	28	12	7	79	41	+38	59.57	25,832	(France) Dominique Rocheteau	20																			
1986–87	L1	7th	R32	—N/a	—N/a	UCL	R1	—N/a	—N/a	43	15	15	13	39	37	+2	34.88	20,312	(Socialist Federal Republic of Yugoslavia) Vahid Halilhodžić	9																			
1987–88	L1	15th	R32	—N/a	—N/a	—N/a	—N/a	—N/a	—N/a	41	13	10	18	38	51	−13	31.71	19,507	(Senegal) Oumar Sène	6																			
1988–89	L1	2nd	R16	—N/a	—N/a	—N/a	—N/a	—N/a	—N/a	43	22	14	7	57	34	+23	51.16	17,502	(France) Daniel Xuereb	17																			
1989–90	L1	5th	R64	—N/a	—N/a	UEL	R2	—N/a	—N/a	43	19	7	17	54	54	+0	44.19	17,397	(Socialist Federal Republic of Yugoslavia) Zlatko Vujović	11																			
1990–91	L1	9th	R16	—N/a	—N/a	—N/a	—N/a	—N/a	—N/a	41	15	12	14	42	44	−2	36.59	14,817	(Socialist Federal Republic of Yugoslavia) Safet Sušić (Socialist Federal Republic of Yugoslavia) Zlatko Vujović	11																			
1991–92	L1	3rd	R32	—N/a	—N/a	—N/a	—N/a	—N/a	—N/a	40	16	17	7	49	31	+18	40.00	26,542	(France) Christian Perez	13																			
1992–93	L1	2nd	W	—N/a	—N/a	UEL	SF	—N/a	—N/a	54	30	14	10	84	37	+47	55.56	26,693	(Liberia) George Weah	23																			
1993–94	L1	1st	QF	—N/a	—N/a	UCWC	SF	—N/a	—N/a	50	32	13	5	82	28	+54	64.00	26,521	(France) David Ginola	18																			
1994–95	L1	3rd	W	W	—N/a	UCL	SF	—N/a	—N/a	61	39	9	13	96	52	+44	63.93	33,348	(Liberia) George Weah	18																			
1995–96	L1	2nd	R16	R32	W	UCWC	W	—N/a	—N/a	52	29	12	11	90	48	+42	55.77	37,353	(France) Youri Djorkaeff	20																			
1996–97	L1	2nd	R16	R32	—N/a	USC UCWC	RU RU	—N/a	—N/a	53	25	15	13	88	53	+35	47.17	35,302	(France) Patrice Loko	21																			
1997–98	L1	8th	W	W	—N/a	UCL	GS	—N/a	—N/a	53	29	9	15	76	53	+23	54.72	36,227	(Italy) Marco Simone	22																			
1998–99	L1	9th	R32	QF	W	UCWC	R1	—N/a	—N/a	42	13	12	17	42	43	−1	30.95	40,910	(Italy) Marco Simone	10																			
1999–2000	L1	2nd	R16	RU	—N/a	—N/a	—N/a	—N/a	—N/a	42	22	10	10	72	51	+21	52.38	42,793	(Brazil) Christian	19																			
2000–01	L1	9th	R32	R32	—N/a	UCL	GS2	—N/a	—N/a	49	17	11	21	69	71	−2	34.69	42,717	(France) Laurent Robert	17																			
2001–02	L1	4th	QF	SF	—N/a	UIC UEL	W R3	—N/a	—N/a	56	26	22	8	84	34	+50	46.43	41,063	(Brazil) Ronaldinho	13																			
2002–03	L1	11th	RU	R32	—N/a	UEL	R3	—N/a	—N/a	51	24	12	15	66	44	+22	47.06	38,829	(Brazil) Ronaldinho	12																			
2003–04	L1	2nd	W	R32	—N/a	—N/a	—N/a	—N/a	—N/a	45	27	12	6	62	34	+28	60.00	39,245	(Portugal) Pauleta	23																			
2004–05	L1	9th	R16	R16	RU	UCL	GS	—N/a	—N/a	50	16	18	16	58	58	+0	32.00	35,157	(Portugal) Pauleta	19																			
2005–06	L1	9th	W	R16	—N/a	—N/a	—N/a	—N/a	—N/a	46	20	13	13	62	44	+18	43.48	40,486	(Portugal) Pauleta	28																			
2006–07	L1	15th	QF	R16	RU	UEL	R16	—N/a	—N/a	55	21	16	18	68	56	+12	38.18	36,205	(Portugal) Pauleta	24																			
2007–08	L1	16th	RU	W	—N/a	—N/a	—N/a	—N/a	—N/a	49	20	13	16	60	51	+9	40.82	36,755	(Ivory Coast) Amara Diané (Portugal) Pauleta	15																			
2008–09	L1	6th	R16	SF	—N/a	UEL	QF	—N/a	—N/a	57	29	12	16	74	54	+20	50.88	40,902	(France) Guillaume Hoarau	20																			
2009–10	L1	13th	W	R16	—N/a	—N/a	—N/a	—N/a	—N/a	46	18	12	16	62	48	+14	39.13	33,266	(Turkey) Mevlüt Erdinç	19																			
2010–11	L1	4th	RU	SF	RU	UEL	R16	—N/a	—N/a	60	26	22	12	96	63	+33	43.33	29,319	(France) Guillaume Hoarau (Brazil) Nenê	20																			
2011–12	L1	2nd	QF	R16	—N/a	UEL	GS	—N/a	—N/a	51	31	11	9	99	55	+44	60.78	42,891	(Brazil) Nenê	27																			
2012–13	L1	1st	QF	QF	—N/a	UCL	QF	—N/a	—N/a	54	35	13	6	101	36	+65	64.81	43,235	(Sweden) Zlatan Ibrahimović	35																			
2013–14	L1	1st	R32	W	W	UCL	QF	—N/a	—N/a	55	40	9	6	126	41	+85	72.73	45,420	(Sweden) Zlatan Ibrahimović	41																			
2014–15	L1	1st	W	W	W	UCL	QF	—N/a	—N/a	59	39	14	6	122	54	+68	66.10	45,789	(Uruguay) Edinson Cavani	31																			
2015–16	L1	1st	W	W	W	UCL	QF	—N/a	—N/a	59	47	8	4	143	31	+112	79.66	46,160	(Sweden) Zlatan Ibrahimović	50																			
2016–17	L1	2nd	W	W	W	UCL	R16	—N/a	—N/a	57	42	9	6	141	44	+97	73.68	45,317	(Uruguay) Edinson Cavani	49																			
2017–18	L1	1st	W	W	W	UCL	R16	—N/a	—N/a	57	45	6	6	171	48	+123	78.95	46,930	(Uruguay) Edinson Cavani	40																			
2018–19	L1	1st	RU	QF	W	UCL	R16	—N/a	—N/a	55	40	7	8	149	52	+97	72.73	46,911	(France) Kylian Mbappé	39																			
2019–20	L1	1st	W	W	W	UCL	RU	—N/a	—N/a	49	40	4	5	136	35	+101	81.63	47,517	(France) Kylian Mbappé	30																			
2020–21	L1	2nd	W	—N/a	W	UCL	SF	—N/a	—N/a	57	38	6	13	126	46	+80	66.67	434	(France) Kylian Mbappé	42																			
2021–22	L1	1st	R16	—N/a	RU	UCL	R16	—N/a	—N/a	50	32	11	7	112	48	+64	64.00	41,318	(France) Kylian Mbappé	39																			
2022–23	L1	1st	R16	—N/a	W	UCL	R16	—N/a	—N/a	50	34	6	10	120	53	+67	68.00	46,221	(France) Kylian Mbappé	41																			
2023–24	L1	1st	W	—N/a	W	UCL	SF	—N/a	—N/a	53	34	12	7	124	52	+72	64.15	47,316	(France) Kylian Mbappé	44																			
2024–25	L1	1st	W	—N/a	W	UCL	W	FCWC	RU	65	48	8	9	168	59	+109	73.85	47,639	(France) Ousmane Dembélé	35																			
2025–26	L1	1st	R32	—N/a	W	USC UCL	W W	FIC	W	56	35	12	9	128	58	+70	62.50	47,577	(France) Ousmane Dembélé	20																			
2026–27	L1	TBD	TBD	—N/a	RU	USC UCL	W TBD	FIC	TBD	0	0	0	0	0	0	+0	—	TBD	TBD	TBD																			
