= Jean-Claude Mascret =

French athlete and football manager (born 1941)

Personal information
- Date of birth: 15 July 1941 (age 85)
- Place of birth: France

Senior career*
Years	Team	Apps	(Gls)
- Olympique Saint-Quentin

Managerial career
- 1972–1991: Olympique Saint-Quentin
- * Club domestic league appearances and goals

Jean-Claude Mascret (born 15 July 1941) was a French athlete who practiced gymnastics, judo, rowing, and football, where he stood out as a manager, overseeing Olympique Saint-Quentin for 19 years, from 1972 until 1991.

== Sporting career ==
Born on 15 July 1941, Mascret took out a license with Olympique Saint-Quentin in 1956, aged 15, where he practiced several sports, such as gymnastics, judo, rowing, and football.

Mascret was appointed as the club's coach in 1972, a position that he held for 19 years, until 1991, which still is a club record, having led OSQ in 538 matches. Under his leadership, the club achieved promotion to the third division, where it stayed until 1990 (except for a stint in the lower tier in 1981–86), when it achieved promotion to Ligue 2, becoming the surprise team at the start of the 1990–91 French Division 2, but the club soon plummeted, so Mascret was replaced by his assistant Didier Toffolo.

== Later life ==
On 7 March 2013, Mascret, who then had a 57-year license at OSQ, was one of the seven Saint-Quentin residents who received the city's medal of honor. He eventually became the club's oldest member, as well as a member of the club's board of directors.

== See also ==
- List of longest managerial reigns in association football
