= Grappin =

Grappin is a surname. Notable people with the surname include:

- Henri Grappin (1881–1959), French linguist and grammarian
- Patrick Grappin (born 1955), French footballer and manager
- Sarah Grappin (born 1978), French actress
