= Périgueux Foot =

Football club in Périgueux, France

Périgueux
- Full name: Périgueux Foot
- Founded: 1978 (as FC Périgueux); 1998 (as Périgueux Foot)
- Ground: Plaine des Jeux de Saltgourde
- President: Jérôme Rebière
- Manager: Alexis Jouandeau
- League: Départemental 2 Nouvelle-Aquitaine, Dordogne-Périgord; Group B
- Website: https://pxfoot.footeo.com/

Périgueux Foot is a football club located in Périgueux, France. The team plays in the Départemental 2, the tenth tier of French football. The club's colours are red and white.

== History ==
In 1978, FC Fossemagne, who were at the time playing in the Division d'Honneur, merged with US Gour de l'Arche to create FC Périgueux. The club entered the newly-created Division 4 in its first season in existence. From 1979 to 1990, the club went up and down between the Division 3 and the Division 4. However, in 1990, the club suffered relegation to the Division d'Honneur, returning to regional level football. The same year, the club was renamed to RC Périgueux. Périgueux has played at a regional level ever since. In 1998, a merger with CO Périgueux-Ouest meant that the club now became Périgueux Foot.

The club's best-ever performance in the Coupe de France was in the 1986–87 edition, when the club reached the round of 16.

=== Name changes ===
- 19??–1978: FC Fossemagne
- 1978–1990: FC Périgueux (FC Fossemagne merged with US Gour de l'Arche)
- 1990–1998: RC Périgueux (club renamed)
- 1998–present: Périgueux Foot (RC Périgueux merged with CO Périgueux-Ouest)

=== Managerial history ===
- 1979: (France) Georges Peyroche
- 1980–1981: (France) Pierre Alonzo
- 1983–1988: (France) Bernard Caron (player-manager; joint-manager from 1986 to 1988)
- 1986–1988: (France) Marcel Campagnac (player-manager; joint-manager from 1986 to 1988)
- 1991: (France) Georges Peyroche
- 1991–1994: (France) Jean-Luc Sokal
- 1994–1995: (France) Christian Zajaczkowski
- (France) Denis Flamin (interim)
- 2010–20??: (France) Thierry Heller
- 2016–20??: Lakbir Nasser
- (France) Alexis Jouandeau

== Notable former players ==
- (France) Bernard Caron
- (France) Claude Chazottes
- (France) Serge Allicot
- (France) Bruno Cheravola
- (France) Thierry Heller
- (France) Christian Zajaczkowski
- (France) Alexis Jouandeau
- (France) Jean-Michel Malirat

== Honours ==
Honours	No.	Years
Division d'Honneur Centre-Ouest (Note: The 1972–73 Division d'Honneur Centre-Ouest was won by the predecessor of Périgueux Foot, FC Fossemagne.)	1	1972–73
