= Pierre Alonzo =

French football player and manager (1940–2024)

Personal information
- Date of birth: 23 March 1940
- Place of birth: Meknes, French Morocco
- Date of death: 18 September 2024 (aged 84)
- Position: Midfielder

Senior career*
Years	Team	Apps	(Gls)
- Aïn-Temouchent
- Avellaneda
- Perpignan
- Red Star
1965–1967	Cannes	26	(0)
1967–1973	Menton		

Managerial career
- Saint-Tropez
- 1978: Paris Saint-Germain
- 1979: Paris Saint-Germain
- 1980–1981: Périgueux
- 1989: Nice
- * Club domestic league appearances and goals

Pierre Alonzo (23 March 1940 – 18 September 2024) was a French football player and manager. As a player, he was a midfielder, playing for Aïn-Temouchent, Avellaneda, Perpignan, Red Star, Cannes, and Menton. After retiring, he went on to coach Saint-Tropez, Paris Saint-Germain, Bordeaux, Périgueux, and Nice.

== Personal life and death ==
Alonzo died on 18 September 2024, at the age of 84. He was the father of goalkeeper Jérôme Alonzo.
