= 1980–81 Coupe de France =

Tournament details
- Country: France

The Coupe de France 1980–81 was its 64th edition. It was won by SC Bastia which defeated AS Saint-Étienne in the Final.

== Round of 16 ==
Team 1	Agg.	Team 2	1st leg	2nd leg
SEC Bastia (D1)	3–2	AS Monaco (D1)	2–0	1–2
FC Nantes (D1)	5–10	Girondins de Bordeaux (D1)	1–4	4–6
AS Nancy (D1)	3–4	AS Saint-Étienne (D1)	2–1	1–3
LB Châteauroux (D2)	1–2	Lille OSC (D1)	1–0	0–2
Le Havre AC (D2)	1–2	RC Lens (D1)	1–0	0–2
FC Metz (D1)	2–2 (a)	Montpellier HSC (D2)	2–1	0–1
RC Strasbourg (D1)	3–2	AS Angoulême (D2)	2–0	1–2
Thionville FC (D2)	2–5	FC Martigues (D2)	2–2	0–3

== Quarter-finals ==
Team 1	Agg.	Team 2	1st leg	2nd leg
RC Lens (D1)	3–2	Lille OSC (D1)	3–1	0–1
Girondins de Bordeaux (D1)	1–9	RC Strasbourg (D1)	1–5	0–4
AS Saint-Étienne (D1)	3–2	Montpellier HSC (D2)	2–1	1–1
FC Martigues (D2)	3–5	SEC Bastia (D1)	3–0	0–5

== Semi-finals ==
=== First leg ===
5 May 1981

Bastia (1)	2–0	Lens (1)
Cazes 60'; Milla 85'

Stade Furiani, Bastia
Attendance: 10,000
Referee: Robert Wurtz

6 May 1981

Saint-Étienne (1)	2–1	Strasbourg (1)
Bellus 32'; Zanon 67'		Piasecki 16'

Stade Geoffroy-Guichard, Saint-Étienne
Attendance: 12,698
Referee: Marcel Bacou

=== Second leg ===
9 June 1981

Lens (1)	0–1	Bastia (1)
		Marcialis 85'

Stade Félix Bollaert, Lens
Attendance: 35,000
Referee: Daniel Lambert

Bastia won 3–1 on aggregate.

9 June 1981

Strasbourg (1)	1–1	Saint-Étienne (1)
Decastel 77'		Perez 88'

Stade de la Meinau, Strasbourg
Attendance: 25,000
Referee: Henri Didier

Saint-Étienne won 3–2 on aggregate.

== Final ==
13 June 1981

Bastia	2–1	Saint-Étienne
Marcialis 50'; Milla 58'		Santini 72'

Parc des Princes, Paris
Attendance: 46,155
Referee: Georges Konrath
