= Claude Chazottes =

French footballer (born 1949)

Personal information
- Date of birth: 7 January 1949 (age 77)
- Place of birth: Épinay-sur-Seine, France
- Height: 1.69 m (5 ft 7 in)
- Positions: Defender; midfielder

Senior career*
| Years | Team | Apps | (Gls) |
| 1969–1970 | RC Paris-Sedan | | |
| 1970–1973 | CA Montreuil | | |
| 1973–1976 | Paris FC | 56+ (Note: Statistics for the 1974–75 and 1975–76 seasons are not complete.) | (1+) |
| 1976–1982 | Red Star | | |
| 1982–1985 | Périgueux | | |

International career
- France
- * Club domestic league appearances and goals

Claude Chazottes (born 7 January 1949) is a French former professional footballer who played as a defender and midfielder. He competed in the men's tournament at the 1976 Summer Olympics.

== Personal life ==
After the conclusion of his professional career in 1985, Chazottes kept on playing football at an amateur level. He played for JS Saint-Astier from 1985 to 1987, CO Coulounieix-Chamiers from 1987 to 1988, JS Saint-Astier again from 1988 to 1996, ES La Chapelle-Gonaguet from 1996 to 2008, and JS Saint-Astier for a third time after 2008.
