= Olivier Rouyer =

France international football player (b. 1955)

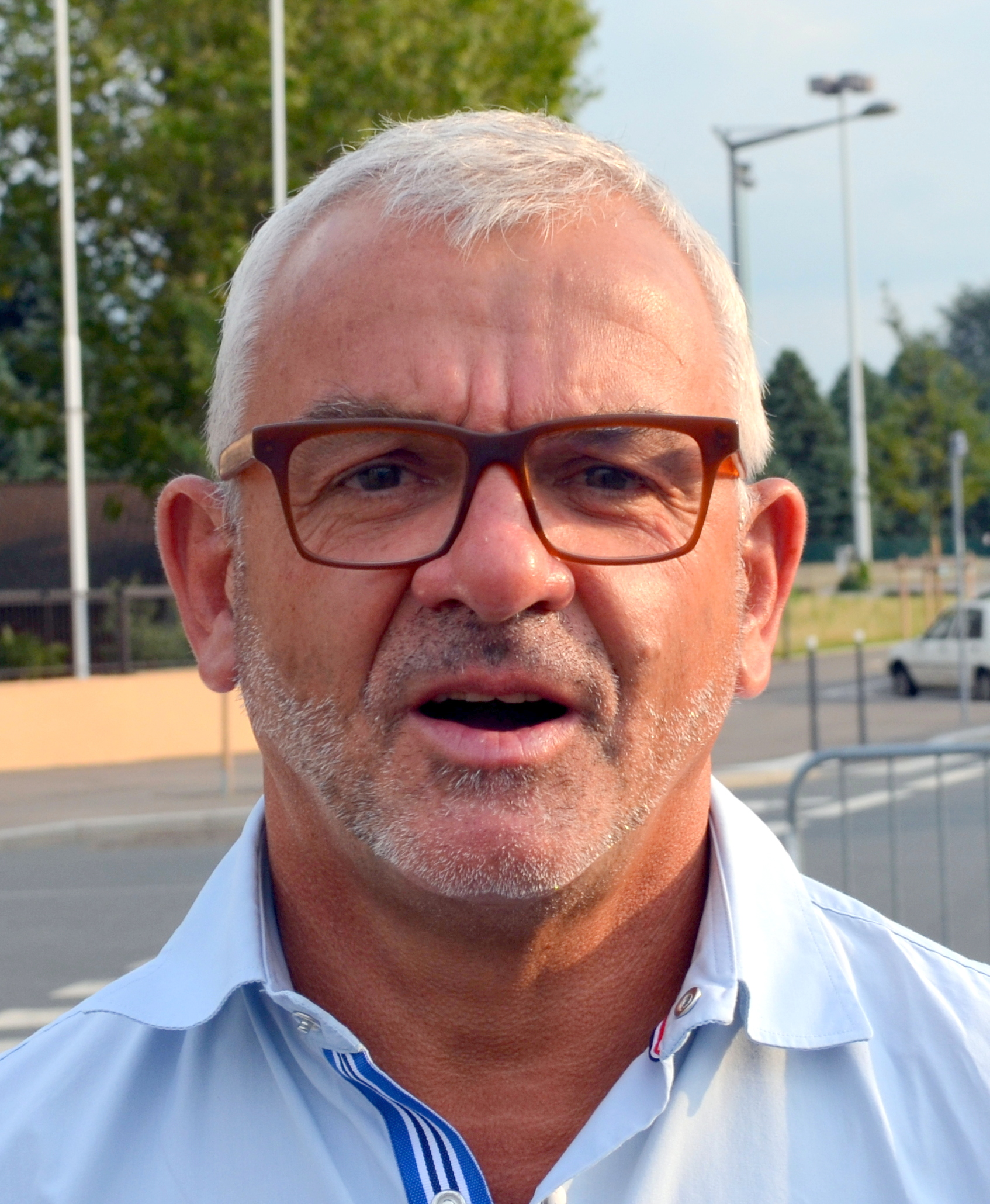
- Rouyer in 2014

Personal information
- Date of birth: 1 December 1955 (age 70)
- Place of birth: Nancy, France
- Height: 1.70 m (5 ft 7 in)
- Position: Forward

Senior career*
Years	Team	Apps	(Gls)
1973–1981	Nancy	210	(73)
1974–1975	→ ECAC Chaumont (loan)	29	(3)
1981–1984	Strasbourg	77	(11)
1984–1986	Lyon	45	(10)
1986–1988	FCO Neudorf		
1988–1990	FC Strasbourg K 06		

International career
1976–1981	France	17	(2)

Managerial career
- 1991–1994: Nancy
- 1999: FC Sion
- * Club domestic league appearances and goals

Olivier Rouyer (born 1 December 1955) is a French former professional footballer who played as a forward. He earned seventeen international caps (two goals) for the France national team during the late 1970s and early 1980s. A player of Nancy, he was a member of the France national team in the 1978 FIFA World Cup. He coached Nancy from 1991 to 1994.

== Personal life ==
Rouyer is gay, coming out after retiring as a player and coach.

== Honours ==
Nancy

- Coupe de France: 1977–78

== See also ==
- List of LGBT Olympians
