= Jean-Claude Cloët =

French footballer (born 1951)

Personal information
- Date of birth: 11 July 1951 (age 75)
- Place of birth: Maresches, France
- Height: 1.77 m (5 ft 10 in)
- Position: Defender

Senior career*
Years	Team	Apps	(Gls)
1973–1975	Valenciennes		
1975–1982	Nancy		
1982–1984	Cannes		
1984–1985	CO Saint-Dizier		

Managerial career
- 1984–1985: CO Saint-Dizier
- 1988–1993: Gravelines
- 1993–1994: Calais RUFC
- 2010–2011: Lucciana
- 2005: Reims
- 2024–2025: Lucciana
- * Club domestic league appearances and goals

Jean-Claude Cloët (born 11 July 1951) is a French football manager and former player. A defender, he was a part of the France B team that finished runners-up at the 1975 Mediterranean Games.
