= Yannick Guillochon =

French footballer (born 1960)

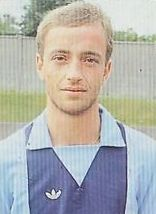
- Guillochon with Le Havre in 1986

Personal information
- Date of birth: 2 June 1960 (age 66)
- Place of birth: Saint-Germain-en-Laye, France
- Height: 1.79 m (5 ft 10 in)
- Positions: Defender; midfielder

Youth career
- –1970: Stade Saint-Germain
- 1970–1982: Paris Saint-Germain

Senior career*
Years	Team	Apps	(Gls)
1982–1985	Paris Saint-Germain	62	(2)
1985–1988	Le Havre	78	(0)
1988–1991	Rennes	53	(2)
1991–1993	Poissy		
Total		193+	(4+)
- * Club domestic league appearances and goals

Yannick Guillochon (born 2 June 1960) is a French former professional footballer who played as a defender and midfielder.

== After football ==
After retiring from the sport, Guillochon separated himself from the world of football, and became an entrepreneur. He started two construction companies.

== Honours ==
Paris Saint-Germain

- Coupe de France: 1982–83; runner-up: 1984–85

Individual

- France Football Best French Young Player: 1982–83
