= Rémy Vogel =

French footballer (1960–2016)

Personal information
- Date of birth: 26 November 1960
- Place of birth: Strasbourg, France
- Date of death: 17 October 2016 (aged 55)
- Height: 1.80 m (5 ft 11 in)
- Position: Defender

Senior career*
Years	Team	Apps	(Gls)
1977–1987	Strasbourg	235	(7)
1987–1990	Monaco	70	(0)
Total		305	(7)

International career
1987	France	1	(0)
- * Club domestic league appearances and goals

Rémy Vogel (26 November 1960 – 17 October 2016) was a French professional footballer who played as a defender for Strasbourg and Monaco. He made one international appearance for France, against the USSR in a Euro 88 qualifier in Moscow in September 1987. Vogel served as captain for Strasbourg between 1985 and 1987.

He died after a long illness on 17 October 2016 aged 55.
