= Thierry Morin =

French footballer (born 1957)

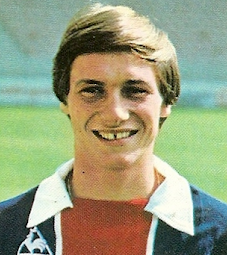
- Morin with Paris Saint-Germain in 1981

Personal information
- Date of birth: 12 December 1957 (age 68)
- Place of birth: Saint-Germain-en-Laye, France
- Height: 1.76 m (5 ft 9 in)
- Position: Defender

Youth career
- 1966–1970: Stade Saint-Germain
- 1970–1975: Paris Saint-Germain

Senior career*
Years	Team	Apps	(Gls)
1974–1977	Paris Saint-Germain B		
1975–1986	Paris Saint-Germain	148	(1)
1986–1989	Red Star		
Total		175+	(1+)
- * Club domestic league appearances and goals

Thierry Morin (born 12 December 1957) is a French former professional footballer who played as a defender. As of June 2025, he works as the general secretary of the Association Paris Saint-Germain.

== Playing career ==
Morin's first youth club was Stade Saint-Germain, his hometown club at which he stayed from 1966 until the merger with Paris FC to form Paris Saint-Germain in 1970. He would join the PSG Academy that year. His first team debut came on 21 December 1975 in a 3–2 loss to Reims. Morin was one of the four PSG academy graduates called the "four musketeers", along with Lionel Justier, Jean-Marc Pilorget, and François Brisson.

During his 11 years as a pro player at PSG, Morin won one Division 1 and two Coupe de France titles. His only goal came in a 1–1 draw against Monaco on 17 August 1982. He left for Red Star in 1986 after having made 174 appearances for the Parisians in all competitions.

From 1986 to 1989, while playing for Red Star, Morin was simultaneously head of the club's youth academy. However, he retired in 1989, and left the youth academy role as well.

== Post-playing career ==
In 1989, after retiring from playing football, Morin returned to Paris Saint-Germain as an employee. He became science professor at the Camp des Loges and director of the multi-sport Centre de Formation d’Apprentis (CFA) project initiated by the club. In 1994, he experienced PSG's second league title, but this time as an employee. By the 2020s decade, Morin was still working in the youth academy of PSG. In an interview in 2017, he humorously described himself as the "dinosaur" of PSG. Morin has served as the general secretary of the Association Paris Saint-Germain.

In the 2000s, Morin was vice president of the association of former PSG players.

== Personal life ==
Born in Saint-Germain-en-Laye, Morin hails from a sports-practicing family. His parents were basketball players in Saint-Germain-en-Laye, and his brothers played football as well.

== Honours ==
Paris Saint-Germain

- Division 1: 1985–86
- Coupe de France: 1981–82, 1982–83; runner-up: 1984–85
