= Thierry Bacconnier =

French footballer (1963–2007)

Personal information
- Date of birth: 2 October 1963
- Place of birth: Paris, France
- Date of death: 1 January 2007 (aged 43)
- Position: Defender

Senior career*
Years	Team	Apps	(Gls)
- Bollène
- Sporting Club d'Orange
1980-82	Paris Saint-Germain B		
1982-88	Paris Saint-Germain	76	(2)
1988-90	Angers	27	(0)
1990-92	Châteauroux	4	(0)
Medal record
First place	Coupe de France	1983
Second place	Coupe de France	1985
First place	French Division 1	1986
Second place	Trophée des Champions	1987
- * Club domestic league appearances and goals

Thierry Bacconnier (2 October 1963 in Paris – 1 January 2007) was a French footballer who played in the position of left fullback. His father was a professional player in the 1960s.

Born in Paris, he initially played for Bollène and Sporting Club d'Orange, before joining Paris SG in 1980. Thierry played his first match in the D1 on 5 February 1983. A total of 95 times he defended the colors of the PSG, either in the league (75 games), Coupe de France (16 games) or in the European Cup (4 games).

From 1988 to 1990 he played for SCO Angers, and from 1990 to 1992 he played for LB Châteauroux.
