= Armando Bianchi =

Italian footballer (born 1954)

Personal information
- Full name: Armando Bianchi
- Date of birth: 20 November 1954 (age 71)
- Place of birth: Tavernerio, Italy
- Height: 1.77 m (5 ft 10 in)
- Position: Attacking midfielder

Youth career
- 1964–1972: Rouen

Senior career*
Years	Team	Apps	(Gls)
1972–1978	Rouen	176	(47)
1978–1981	Paris Saint-Germain	42	(4)
1980–1981	→ Nîmes (loan)	18	(4)
1981–1982	Paris FC	34	(14)
1982–1984	Racing Club de France	48	(10)
1984–1985	Grenoble	17	(1)
1985–1988	Roanne Foot		
1988–1993	Riorges		

Managerial career
- 1985–1988: Roanne Foot (player-manager)
- 1988–1993: Riorges (player-manager)
- Roanne Foot
- * Club domestic league appearances and goals

Armando Bianchi (born 20 November 1954) is an Italian former footballer who played as an attacking midfielder. He is a naturalized French citizen.

== Career ==
In 1976, Bianchi signed for Paris Saint-Germain, one of France's most successful clubs, after playing for Rouen in the French second division.

At the age of 29, while playing for French second division side Racing Club de France, he suffered a career-shortening injury.

== After football ==
From 1985 to 1993, Bianchi was player-manager in Roanne and Riorges. He ended his playing days in 1993, and went to work for an insurance company for 12 years. In 2005, Bianchi returned to Roanne Foot, this time as both coach and technical director.

== Personal life ==
Bianchi arrived in France at the age of 5. He became a naturalized citizen at the age of 24.
