= Antoine Garceran =

French footballer (born 1950)

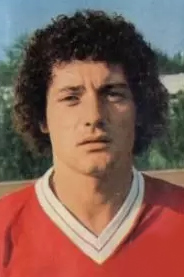
- Garceran with Reims in 1978

Personal information
- Date of birth: 7 February 1950 (age 76)
- Place of birth: Béziers, France
- Height: 1.76 m (5 ft 9 in)
- Positions: Defender; midfielder

Senior career*
Years	Team	Apps	(Gls)
1967–1971	Béziers		
1971–1977	Valenciennes	138	(2)
1977–1979	Reims	67	(0)
1979–1981	Paris Saint-Germain	38	(0)
1981–1983	Gazélec Ajaccio		
Total		266+	(3+)
- * Club domestic league appearances and goals

Antoine "Tony" Garceran (born 7 February 1950) is a French former professional footballer who played as a defender and midfielder.

== Honours ==
Valenciennes

- Division 2: 1971–72
