= Abel Braga =

Brazilian footballer (born 1952)

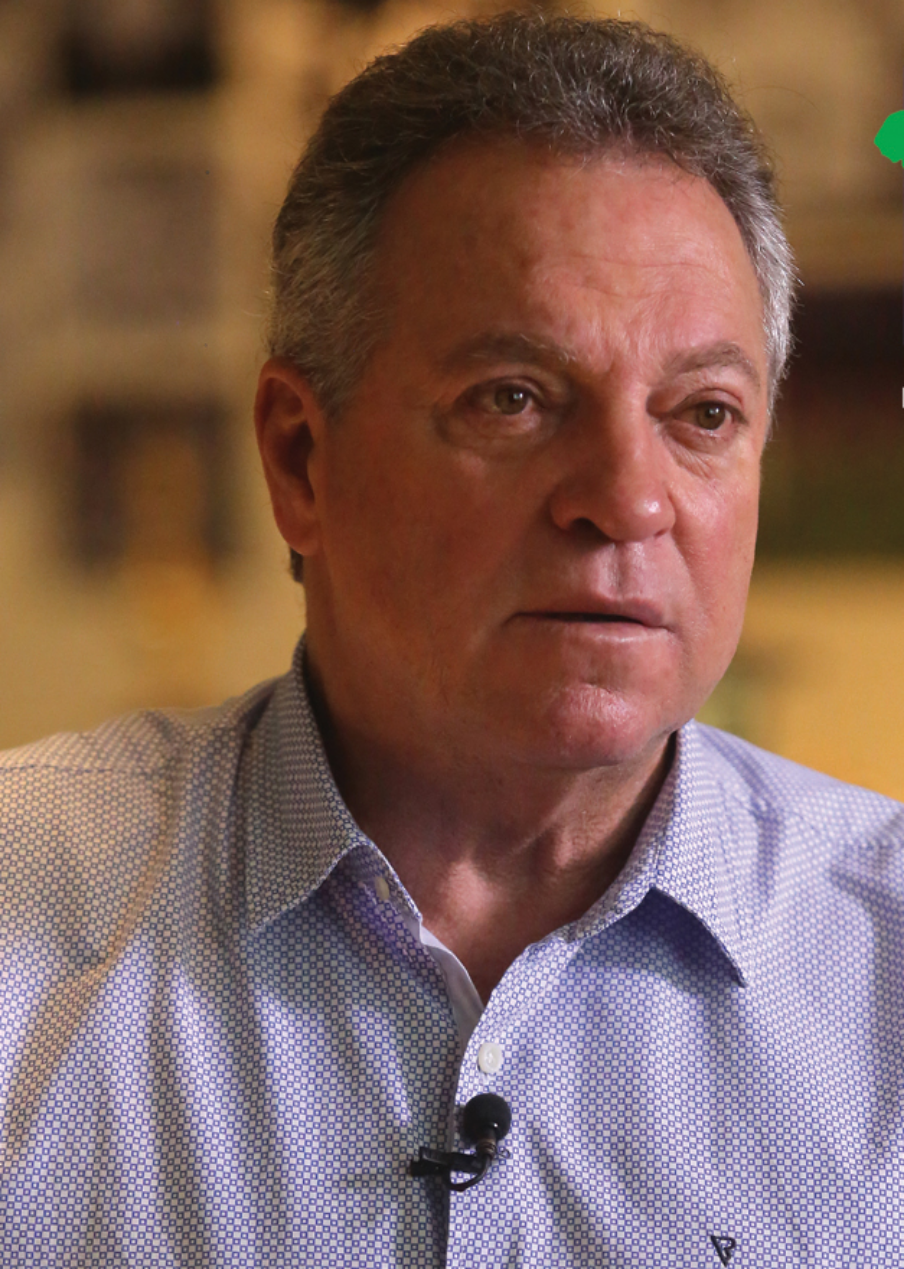
- Braga in 2018

Personal information
- Full name: Abel Carlos da Silva Braga
- Date of birth: 1 September 1952 (age 74)
- Place of birth: Rio de Janeiro, Brazil
- Height: 1.87 m (6 ft 1 1/2 in)
- Position: Centre back

Team information
- Current team: Internacional (technical director)

Youth career
- 1968–1971: Fluminense

Senior career*
Years	Team	Apps	(Gls)
1971–1976	Fluminense	51	(1)
1973	→ Figueirense (loan)	18	(1)
1976–1979	Vasco da Gama	144	(2)
1979–1981	Paris Saint-Germain	45	(9)
1981–1982	Cruzeiro	27	(4)
1982–1984	Botafogo	62	(11)
1984	Goytacaz	18	(2)

International career
1971–1978	Brazil	4	(0)

Managerial career
- 1985: Goytacaz
- 1985: Botafogo
- 1985–1986: Rio Ave
- 1986: Vitória
- 1987: Galícia
- 1987–1988: Santa Cruz
- 1988–1989: Internacional
- 1989–1991: Famalicão
- 1991: Internacional
- 1992–1993: Belenenses
- 1993–1994: Famalicão
- 1994–1995: Vitória de Setúbal
- 1995: Vasco da Gama
- 1995: Internacional
- 1997: Guarani
- 1997–1998: Atlético Paranaense
- 1998: Bahia
- 1999: Coritiba
- 1999–2000: Paraná
- 2000: Vasco da Gama
- 2000: Marseille
- 2001: Atlético Mineiro
- 2001–2002: Botafogo
- 2002: Botafogo
- 2002: Atlético Paranaense
- 2003: Ponte Preta
- 2004: Flamengo
- 2005: Fluminense
- 2006–2007: Internacional
- 2007–2008: Internacional
- 2008–2011: Al Jazira
- 2011–2013: Fluminense
- 2014: Internacional
- 2015: Al Jazira
- 2017–2018: Fluminense
- 2019: Flamengo
- 2019: Cruzeiro
- 2020: Vasco da Gama
- 2020–2021: Internacional
- 2021: Lugano
- 2022: Fluminense
- 2025: Internacional
- * Club domestic league appearances and goals

Abel Carlos da Silva Braga (born 1 September 1952) is a Brazilian football coach and former player. He is the current technical director of Internacional.

Braga played as a central defender during a professional career that started with Fluminense in 1968. He earned one cap for Brazil, and was on the 1978 FIFA World Cup squad.

Since his retirement in 1985, Braga has managed a number of clubs in Brazil and Portugal, including three spells at Fluminense and eight spells at Internacional, with whom won the Copa Libertadores and FIFA Club World Cup in 2006. He has also managed French club Marseille, as well as Emirati club Al Jazira over two spells.

== Club career ==
Known as Abel during his playing days, he started his career as a player in Fluminense in 1968, being a regular member of the youth sides. After becoming a part of the first team squad in 1971, he was loaned to Figueirense in 1973.

Back to Flu in 1974, Abel enjoyed a run as a first-choice, but lost his starting spot under head coaches Carlos Alberto Parreira and Paulo Emilio. Unhappy with his backup status, he saw moves to Flamengo and America-RJ being blocked by Fluminense president Francisco Horta, but was sent to Vasco da Gama along with two teammates in early 1976.

Abel then established himself as a regular starter for Vasco, playing 90 matches in his first season. In 1979, he moved abroad for the first time in his career, signing for French club Paris Saint-Germain.

Back to Brazil in 1981, Abel returned to his home country to play for Cruzeiro, but a knee injury took him out for two months shortly after arriving, and he lost space after recovering. He then moved to Botafogo in 1982, where he also struggled with injuries, and later represented Goytacaz, retiring with the club at the end of the 1984 season, aged 32.

== International career ==
Abel played for an under-23 side (named Seleção Brasileira de Novos) in the 1971 CONMEBOL Pre-Olympic Tournament, before playing two matches in the 1972 Summer Olympics. He made his full international debut for the Brazil national team on 19 April 1978, in a 1–1 draw against England at the Wembley Stadium.

Abel was also included in Cláudio Coutinho's squad for the 1978 FIFA World Cup in Argentina, but did not make an appearance in the tournament.

== Coaching career ==
=== Early career ===
In 1985, immediately after retiring, Braga began working as a head coach at his last club Goytacaz. He returned to Botafogo shortly after, coaching the club in the 1985 Campeonato Carioca, before moving to Portugal to take over Rio Ave in November 1985.

Back to Brazil after the end of the 1985–86 season, Braga was in charge of Vitória for the remainder of the year, and later led Galícia and Santa Cruz (where he won the 1987 Campeonato Pernambucano) before being appointed head coach of Internacional in October 1988, replacing Chiquinho.

Braga led Inter to the finals of the 1988 Série A, losing to Bahia, and was knocked out in the semifinals of the 1989 Copa Libertadores to Olimpia on penalties. Sacked in June 1989, he returned to Portugal shortly after, taking over Famalicão.

In June 1991, after leading Famalicão to the Primeira Liga, Abel returned to Internacional in the place of Ênio Andrade, but only lasted three months in charge. In November 1993, after nearly two years at Belenenses (where he also achieved promotion to the top tier), he returned to Famalicão.

Back to Rio Ave in August 1994, Braga was in charge of the side for six matches before being dismissed. He would also manage Vitória de Setúbal in Portugal before joining another club he represented as a player, Vasco da Gama, in April 1995.

Sacked in May 1995, Braga returned to Inter for a third spell in July, and remained in charge until the end of the campaign. On 25 March 1997, after more than a year without a club, he replaced Geninho as head coach of Guarani, but only lasted five matches before being sacked on 21 April.

On 28 June 1997, Braga agreed to become Atlético Paranaense's head coach, and led the club to the 1998 Campeonato Paranaense. Departing in August of that year, he spent a short period in charge of Bahia before returning to the state in April 1999, taking over Coritiba and also winning the year's state league over his former club Atlético.

Sacked from Coxa in September 1999, Braga took over Paraná in the following month, and was kept in charge despite suffering relegation. In March 2000, however, he left the club after receiving an offer to return to Vasco.

=== Marseille ===
In July 2000, Braga signed for Olympique de Marseille – rivals of his former team PSG – who had only just stayed in Ligue 1 on the last day of the previous season. He spent large amounts of money to buy compatriots Marcelinho Paraíba and Adriano Gabiru, and was dismissed in November with the team in the relegation zone having won five out of 16 games.

=== Atlético Mineiro and Botafogo ===
Back to his home country, Braga was appointed Atlético Mineiro head coach in January 2001, but was sacked on 19 April of that year. He returned to Botafogo in October, and despite resigning in March 2002, he returned to the club in August, but resigned again in September.

=== Atlético Paranaense and Ponte Preta ===
Back to Atlético Paranaense in October 2002, Braga was sacked in November, and took over Ponte Preta on 11 December. After avoiding relegation, he left the club on 17 December 2003,

=== Flamengo ===
Immediately after leaving Ponte, Braga took over Flamengo. He won the 2004 Taça Guanabara and the Campeonato Carioca with Fla, but lost the Copa do Brasil to underdogs Santo André, and resigned in July of that year after a loss to Juventude.

=== Fluminense ===
On 21 December 2004, Braga returned to Fluminense, now as head coach. He won the 2005 Campeonato Carioca, and again reached the final of the Copa do Brasil, again losing to another underdog, Paulista.

On 6 December 2005, after missing out on a Copa Libertadores spot, Braga left the club.

=== Fourth and fifth spells at Internacional ===
On 13 December 2005, Braga was announced as head coach of Internacional, replacing Muricy Ramalho. Despite losing the 2006 Campeonato Gaúcho to Grêmio, he won the Copa Libertadores, and ended the season as the sixth best club coach by the IFFHS.

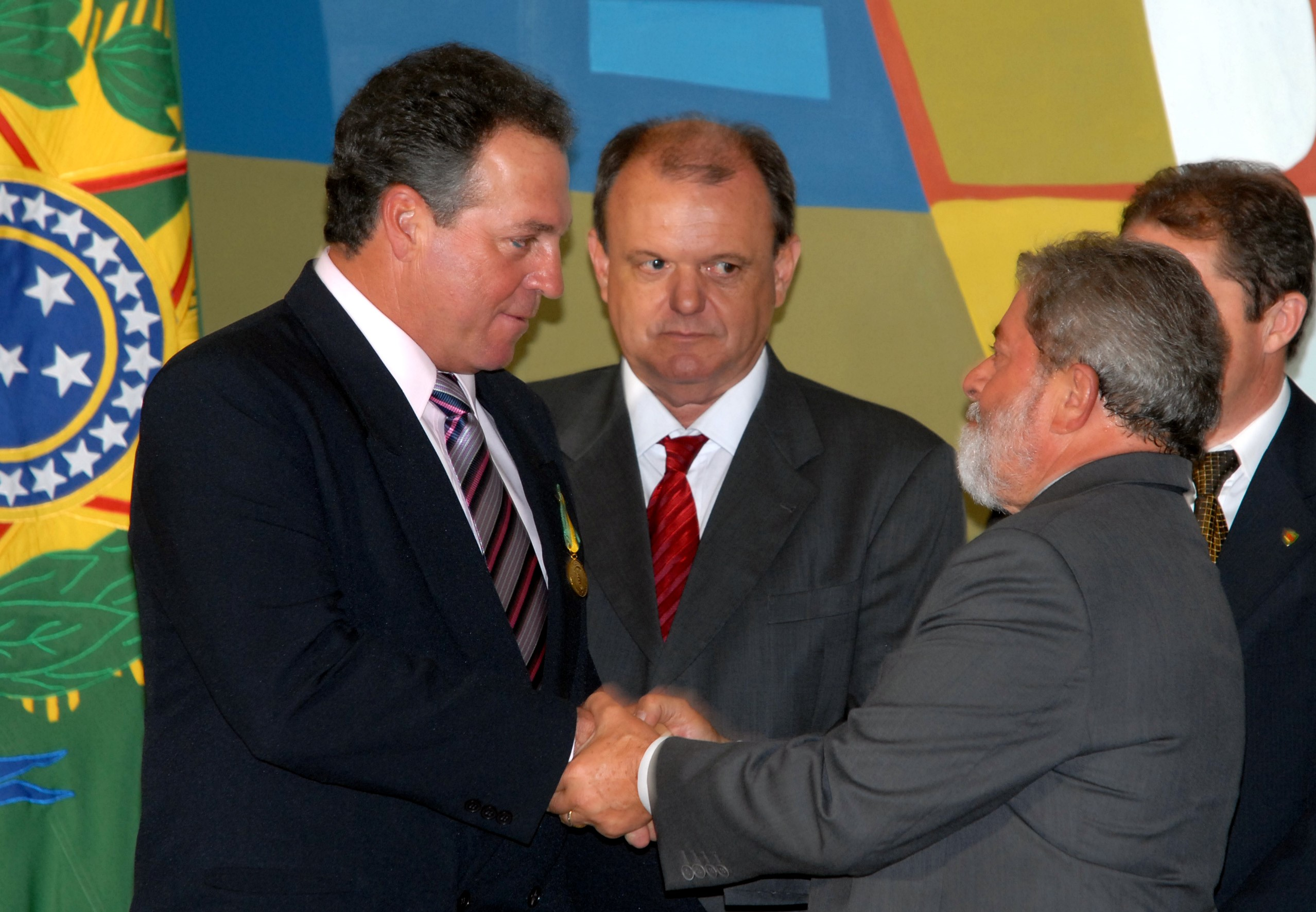
Braga (left) being awarded the Sports Merit Medal by president Lula (right) in January 2007

Braga agreed to a new one-year contract on 12 December 2006, and led the club to the 2006 FIFA Club World Cup title – Inter's biggest-ever accolade – five days later. In April of the following year, however, he was sacked after being knocked out of the 2007 Copa Libertadores in the group stage.

On 10 August 2007, Braga returned to Internacional after the club had sacked Alexandre Gallo, his successor. He won the 2008 Campeonato Gaúcho, and departed the club in June of that year, after agreeing to a contract with Emirati side Al Jazira.

=== Fluminense return ===
On 8 June 2011, Braga was presented back at Fluminense in his home country; he had agreed to return to the club 87 prior to his presentation, and the club was coached by his assistant Leomir de Souza in the meantime. In the following season, he won both the 2012 Campeonato Carioca and the 2012 Série A, being awarded as the best coach of the league.

On 29 July 2013, after five consecutive loses in the 2013 Série A that kept the club in relegation zone, Braga was dismissed from Fluminense.

=== Sixth spell at Internacional ===
On 13 December, he returned to Inter for his sixth spell, and won the 2014 Campeonato Gaúcho. In December 2014, he left the club as his contract was due to expire.

=== Al Jazira return ===
Braga then returned to Al Jazira for a second spell on 16 June 2015, but parted company with the club in December after a string of poor results.

=== Third spell at Fluminense ===
On 1 December 2016, Fluminense announced Braga as their head coach for the ensuing season. On 16 June 2018, he resigned from the club, after having won just one trophy, the 2017 Taça Guanabara.

=== Flamengo return ===
On 2 January 2019, Braga returned to Flamengo as head coach. They confirmed their status as favourites by winning the 2019 Campeonato Carioca, but Braga still resigned on 29 May, after being contested by fans.

=== Cruzeiro ===
Cruzeiro announced Braga as head coach on 27 September 2019, but sacked him on 29 November after winning three games out of 14. He was announced as Vasco da Gama's head coach for the 2020 season on 16 December 2019, but resigned the following 16 March.

=== Seventh spell at Internacional ===
On 10 November 2020, Braga returned to Internacional for a seventh spell as head coach, replacing Eduardo Coudet. He left the following 26 February, after losing the 2020 Série A in the last round.

=== Lugano ===
In June 2021, Braga was hired by Swiss Super League club FC Lugano, but was sacked on 1 September after the team two wins and two defeats in the first 4 league matches of the 2021–22 season.

=== Fourth spell at Fluminense ===
On 15 December, Braga returned to Fluminense for a fourth spell as head coach, but resigned on 28 April 2022, despite winning the 2022 Campeonato Carioca.

=== Retirement ===
On 29 June 2022, Braga announced his retirement as a head coach, stating that he would not discard continue working with football but in another roles.

=== Eighth spell at Internacional ===
On 29 November 2025, Braga came out of retirement to become the head coach of Internacional for the remaining two matches of the season; it was his eighth spell at the club. He agreed to work with no wages in both of the matches, in an attempt to save the club from relegation, which he succeeded in doing, and later became a technical director at the club.

== Personal life ==
On 29 July 2017, Braga's 18-year-old son, João Pedro, died after falling from the balcony of the family's apartment in the Leblon region of Rio de Janeiro. Braga was informed of his son's death whilst undergoing the final preparations for Fluminense's fixture against Ponte Preta the following day. Ponte Preta agreed to Fluminense's request to postpone the match, which was rescheduled by the CBF.

== Managerial statistics ==
As of 7 December 2025

Managerial record by team and tenure
Team	Nat.	From	To	Record								Ref
Team	Nat.	From	To	G	W	D	L	GF	GA	GD	Win %	Ref
Goytacaz	(Brazil)	1 January 1985	28 February 1985	3	2	0	1	4	2	+2	66.67	
Botafogo	(Brazil)	1 March 1985	29 October 1985	35	13	10	12	40	44	−4	37.14	
Rio Ave	(Portugal)	1 November 1985	15 June 1986	31	20	10	1	56	23	+33	64.52	
Vitória	(Brazil)	1 August 1986	15 December 1986	24	5	11	8	21	27	−6	20.83	
Galícia	(Brazil)	1 February 1987	24 July 1987	22	4	4	14	15	32	−17	18.18	
Santa Cruz	(Brazil)	1 August 1987	1 October 1988	49	24	9	16	81	53	+28	48.98	
Internacional	(Brazil)	2 October 1988	18 June 1989	62	31	19	12	95	52	+43	50.00	
Famalicão	(Portugal)	July 1989	May 1991	72	29	22	21	88	65	+23	40.28	
Internacional	(Brazil)	11 June 1991	22 September 1991	18	11	5	2	25	8	+17	61.11	
Belenenses	(Portugal)	3 November 1991	16 October 1993	68	30	21	17	95	69	+26	44.12	
Famalicão	(Portugal)	28 November 1993	2 June 1994	24	4	7	13	19	54	−35	16.67	
Rio Ave	(Portugal)	21 August 1994	1 October 1994	6	2	1	3	6	7	−1	33.33	
Vitória de Setúbal	(Portugal)	20 November 1994	25 February 1995	12	1	2	9	9	21	−12	8.33	
Vasco da Gama	(Brazil)	April 1995	May 1995	14	6	3	5	19	15	+4	42.86	
Internacional	(Brazil)	12 July 1995	3 December 1995	29	12	9	8	44	27	+17	41.38	
Guarani	(Brazil)	25 March 1997	20 April 1997	5	0	3	2	8	11	−3	0.00	
Atlético Paranaense	(Brazil)	28 June 1997	21 August 1998	61	32	15	14	111	71	+40	52.46	
Bahia	(Brazil)	24 August 1998	8 October 1998	6	3	0	3	14	2	+12	50.00	
Coritiba	(Brazil)	30 April 1999	September 1999	21	9	6	6	30	29	+1	42.86	
Paraná	(Brazil)	7 October 1999	5 March 2000	20	10	3	7	28	24	+4	50.00	
Vasco da Gama	(Brazil)	5 March 2000	2 June 2000	23	16	5	2	62	21	+41	69.57	
Marseille	(France)	2 June 2000	17 November 2000	16	5	3	8	17	20	−3	31.25	
Atlético Mineiro	(Brazil)	January 2001	19 April 2001	24	12	8	4	49	23	+26	50.00	
Botafogo	(Brazil)	15 October 2001	8 July 2002	55	21	17	17	100	90	+10	38.18	
Botafogo	(Brazil)	22 August 2002	22 September 2002	8	2	2	4	7	13	−6	25.00	
Atlético Paranaense	(Brazil)	18 October 2002	19 November 2002	6	3	1	2	13	12	+1	50.00	
Ponte Preta	(Brazil)	11 December 2002	14 December 2003	56	15	22	19	83	93	−10	26.79	
Flamengo	(Brazil)	17 December 2003	18 July 2004	44	19	12	13	70	56	+14	43.18	
Fluminense	(Brazil)	21 December 2004	13 December 2005	74	37	17	20	144	109	+35	50.00	
Internacional	(Brazil)	13 December 2005	24 April 2007	94	53	23	18	140	83	+57	56.38	
Internacional	(Brazil)	10 August 2007	1 June 2008	50	28	9	13	93	45	+48	56.00	
Al Jazira	(United Arab Emirates)	2 July 2008	7 June 2011	86	51	21	14	195	114	+81	59.30	
Fluminense	(Brazil)	8 June 2011	29 July 2013	142	77	27	38	230	153	+77	54.23	
Internacional	(Brazil)	17 December 2013	31 December 2014	62	37	10	15	103	63	+40	59.68	
Al Jazira	(United Arab Emirates)	16 June 2015	12 December 2015	16	3	6	7	32	38	−6	18.75	
Fluminense	(Brazil)	30 November 2016	16 June 2018	109	43	29	37	166	129	+37	39.45	
Flamengo	(Brazil)	2 January 2019	29 May 2019	28	18	6	4	54	24	+30	64.29	
Cruzeiro	(Brazil)	27 September 2019	29 November 2019	14	3	8	3	10	11	−1	21.43	
Vasco da Gama	(Brazil)	16 December 2019	16 March 2020	14	4	5	5	8	9	−1	28.57	
Internacional	(Brazil)	10 November 2020	26 February 2021	18	10	4	4	28	14	+14	55.56	
Lugano	(Switzerland)	30 June 2021	1 September 2021	6	3	1	2	14	8	+6	50.00	
Fluminense	(Brazil)	15 December 2021	28 April 2022	21	14	3	4	31	12	+19	66.67	
Internacional	(Brazil)	29 November 2025	8 December 2025	2	1	0	1	3	4	−1	50.00	
Career total				1,564	723	408	433	2,460	1,780	+680	46.23	—

== Honours ==
=== Player ===
Fluminense

- Campeonato Carioca: 1971, 1975
- Taça Guanabara: 1971, 1975

Vasco

- Taça Guanabara: 1976, 1977
- Campeonato Carioca: 1977

=== Manager ===
Santa Cruz

- Campeonato Pernambucano: 1987

Atlético Paranaense

- Campeonato Paranaense: 1998

Coritiba

- Campeonato Paranaense: 1999

Vasco

- Taça Guanabara: 2000

Flamengo

- Campeonato Carioca: 2004, 2019
- Taça Guanabara: 2004
- Taça Rio: 2019

Fluminense

- Campeonato Carioca: 2005, 2012, 2022
- Taça Rio: 2005, 2018
- Taça Guanabara: 2012, 2017, 2022
- Campeonato Brasileiro Série A: 2012

Internacional

- Copa Libertadores: 2006
- FIFA Club World Cup: 2006
- Campeonato Gaúcho: 2008, 2014

Al Jazira

- UAE League Cup: 2010
- UAE Arabian Gulf League: 2010–11
- UAE President's Cup: 2010–11

=== Individual ===
- Campeonato Carioca Manager of the year: 2017

== See also ==
- List of football managers with the most matches
