= Patrick Grappin =

French football player and manager (born 1955)

Personal information
- Date of birth: 22 October 1955 (age 71)
- Place of birth: France
- Position: Centre-back

Youth career
- Roubaix
- 1962–1974: RC France (Note: In 1966, Racing Club de Paris was renamed to Racing Club de France.)

Senior career*
| Years | Team | Apps | (Gls) |
| 1974–1975 | Rennes | 0 | (0) |
| 1975–1976 | Malakoff | | |
| 1976–1979 | Paris Saint-Germain B | | |
| 1979–1980 | Paris Saint-Germain | 1 | (0) |
| 1980–1989 | Poissy | | |

Managerial career
- 1989–1993: Poissy
- * Club domestic league appearances and goals

Patrick Grappin (or Grapin; born 22 October 1955) is a French former professional football player and manager.

== Playing career ==
Grappin played for Roubaix, RC France, Rennes, and Malakoff in his early career. He participated in one game with Paris Saint-Germain during the 1979–80 season, a 2–1 Division 1 loss to Nancy on 22 September 1979. Her went on to play 9 years with Poissy after leaving PSG.

== Managerial career ==
Grappin took charge as manager of Poissy in 1989 after retiring from football. He would later take the position of sporting director at the club in 1993, and left in 1998.
