= Patrice Lecornu =

French footballer (1958–2023)

Personal information
- Date of birth: 28 March 1958
- Place of birth: Flers, France
- Date of death: 3 October 2023 (aged 65)
- Place of death: Cormeilles-en-Parisis, France
- Position: Striker

Youth career
- RC Harlouze

Senior career*
Years	Team	Apps	(Gls)
1977–1976	ASPTT Caen	20	(1)
1976–1978	Red Star	58	(15)
1978–1981	Angers	98	(12)
1981–1984	Nantes	18	(1)
1984–1985	Red Star	16	(2)
Total		190	(30)

International career
1979–1981	France	3	(0)

Managerial career
- 1989–1990: Red Star
- * Club domestic league appearances and goals

Patrice Lecornu (28 March 1958 – 3 October 2023) was a French professional footballer who played as a striker. He died on 3 October 2023, at the age of 65.
