= Philippe Col =

French footballer (born 1956)

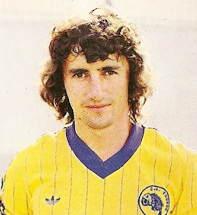
- Col with Toulon in the 1983–84 season

Personal information
- Date of birth: 14 June 1956 (age 70)
- Place of birth: Suresnes, France
- Height: 1.71 m (5 ft 7 in)
- Positions: Full-back; forward

Youth career
- 1962–1973: US Nanterre
- 1973: La Salle Passy Buzenval
- 1973–1975: INF Vichy

Senior career*
Years	Team	Apps	(Gls)
1975–1978	Red Star	77	(1)
1978–1983	Paris Saint-Germain	102	(1)
1983–1984	Toulon	22	(0)
1984–1986	Sète	60	(0)
1986–1988	Saint-Quentin		
1988–1991	JS Suresnes		
1991–1994	FC Saint-Cloud		

Managerial career
- 1986–1988: Saint-Quentin
- 1988–1991: JS Suresnes
- 1991–1994: FC Saint-Cloud
- * Club domestic league appearances and goals

Philippe Col (born 14 June 1956) is a French former professional footballer. As a player, he was an initially a forward but was later converted to a full-back.

== After football ==
After his football career, Col was the manager of a real estate company in the Île-de-France region. He opted not to become a professional football manager like many other former players because he wished to lead a stable life for his children to succeed; he described coaching professional teams as a "mobile" occupation. Col henceforth settled in Rueil-Malmaison.

== Honours ==
Paris Saint-Germain

- Coupe de France: 1981–82, 1982–83

Saint-Quentin

- Coupe de Picardie: 1986–87
