= Henri Zambelli =

French footballer (born 1957)

Personal information
- Date of birth: 9 March 1957 (age 69)
- Place of birth: Marseille, France
- Height: 1.78 m (5 ft 10 in)
- Position: Defender

Youth career
- 1969–1972: Provence Sports Marseille

Senior career*
| Years | Team | Apps | (Gls) |
| 1972–1979 | Nice | | |
| 1979–1980 | Marseille | 32 | (3) |
| 1980–1982 | Nice | 67 | (1) |
| 1982–1985 | Lyon | | |
| 1985–1986 | Brest | 35 | (3) |
| 1986–1987 | Rennes | 33 | (0) |
| 1987–1990 | Orléans | | |
- * Club domestic league appearances and goals

Henri Zambelli (born 9 March 1957) is a French retired professional footballer who played as a defender.
