= Bernard Caron =

French footballer (born 1952)

Personal information
- Date of birth: 11 August 1952 (age 74)
- Place of birth: Billy-Berclau, France
- Height: 1.80 m (5 ft 11 in)
- Position: Centre-back

Youth career
- –1969: Agen
- 1969–1971: Sedan (Note: In 1974, AC Mouzon and CS Sedan Ardennes merged to create CS Sedan Mouzon Ardennes. The club returned to its former name of CS Sedan Ardennes in 1975.)

Senior career*
Years	Team	Apps	(Gls)
1971–1975	Sedan Mouzon	102	(15)
1975–1978	Nancy	111	(7)
1978–1979	Paris FC	31	(1)
1979–1980	Paris Saint-Germain	7	(0)
1980–1983	Rouen	34	(8)
1983–1988	Périgueux		
Total		285+	(31+)

International career
1973	France U21	1	(0)
1973	France B	1	(0)

Managerial career
- 1983–1988: Périgueux
- FC Fumel
- 2007–2014: FC Penne-Saint Sylvestre
- 2015–2016: FC Villeneuve-sur-Lot B
- 2016–2020: FC Villeneuve-sur-Lot
- * Club domestic league appearances and goals

Bernard Caron (born 11 August 1952) is a French professional football manager and former player. He was most recently joint-manager of Régional 2 club FC Villeneuve-sur-Lot. As a player, he was a centre-back.

== Honours ==
Nancy

- Coupe de France: 1977–78
