= Franck Tanasi =

French footballer (born 1959)

Personal information
- Date of birth: 22 December 1959 (age 66)
- Place of birth: Fort-de-France, Martinique, France
- Height: 1.70 m (5 ft 7 in)
- Position: Left-back

Youth career
- –1975: ASPTT Paris
- 1975–1977: Paris Saint-Germain

Senior career*
Years	Team	Apps	(Gls)
1977–1991	Paris Saint-Germain	215	(0)
1979–1981	→ Paris FC (loan)	45	(2)
1981–1982	→ Orléans (loan)	21	(0)
1991–1992	Poissy		
1992–1994	Paris FC		
- * Club domestic league appearances and goals

Franck Tanasi (born 22 December 1959) is a French former professional footballer who played as a left-back.

== Honours ==
Paris Saint-Germain

- French Division 1: 1985–86
- Coupe de France: 1982–83; runner-up: 1984–85
