= Didier Toffolo =

French footballer and manager (born 1959)

Personal information
- Date of birth: 20 February 1959 (age 67)
- Place of birth: Annecy, France
- Height: 1.74 m (5 ft 9 in)
- Positions: Defender; midfielder

Youth career
- 1969–1970: US Annecy-le-Vieux
- 1970–1976: Annecy
- 1976–1977: Monaco
- 1977–1978: Paris Saint-Germain

Senior career*
| Years | Team | Apps | (Gls) |
| 1977–1979 | Paris Saint-Germain B | | |
| 1979–1984 | Paris Saint-Germain | 29 | (0) |
| 1984–1987 | Mulhouse | 101 | (0) |
| 1987–1989 | Clermont | | |
| 1989–1993 | Saint-Quentin | | |
| Total | | 214+ | (4+) |

Managerial career
- 1991–2002: Saint-Quentin
- 2004–2006: Croix-de-Savoie (assistant)
- 2012–2013: Saint-Quentin U17
- US Buire-Hirson-Thiérache
- 2018–2020: Feignies Aulnoye B
- 2020: Feignies Aulnoye
- * Club domestic league appearances and goals

Didier Toffolo (born 20 February 1959) is a French professional football manager and former player who played as a defender and midfielder. He won the Coupe de France twice with Paris Saint-Germain in the 1980s.

== Club career ==
Born in Annecy, Toffolo began his career locally, first playing for US Annecy-le-Vieux and later FC Annecy. In 1976, he signed for Monaco, but he would join Paris Saint-Germain (PSG) a year later. Initially playing for the reserve side, it was at PSG that Toffolo made his professional debut. He would go on to make 35 appearances for the club, winning the Coupe de France on two occasions as well. In 1984, he signed for Division 2 side Mulhouse. At Mulhouse, Toffolo made 101 league appearances across three seasons. He left the club in 1987, signing for Division 3 side Clermont. In his first season at the club, Clermont earned promotion to the Division 2. In the 1988–89 season, Toffolo scored three goals in thirty Division 2 appearances. He signed for Division 3 Saint-Quentin at the end of the campaign. In his first season at Saint-Quentin, the club won promotion after winning the Group North. He would make fifty-four appearances in the Division 2 before the club was relegated to the Division 3 in 1992. Toffolo retired from football in 1993.

== International career ==
Toffolo was a France youth international. He made nine appearances for France youth teams.

== Post-playing career ==
Toffolo became a player-manager at Saint-Quentin in 1991. He would coach the side until 2002, an eleven-year spell during which he won Group A of the Championnat National 3 in the 1995–96 season. In 2003, Toffolo became head of the youth academy of Croix-de-Savoie. In 2004, he became an assistant coach to Pascal Dupraz for the club's first team. In 2006, he became a technical director for Olympique Thonon Chablais. The following year, Olympique Thonon Chablais merged with FC Croix-de-Savoie 74 to form Olympique Croix-de-Savoie 74. Toffolo subsequently became head of the club's academy. He worked in this job until 2009.

In 2013, Saint-Quentin's under-17 team fired Toffolo. He had only coached the side for one season. In 2014, he became the coach of US Buire-Hirson-Thiérache.

In July 2020, he was appointed as head coach of Championnat National 3 side Feignies Aulnoye. He was sacked in October after five games in charge.

== Personal life ==
In November 2012, Toffolo was hired by the sports department of the town of Hirson as an assistant educator.

== Honours ==
=== Player ===
Paris Saint-Germain

- Coupe de France: 1981–82, 1982–83

Saint-Quentin

- Division 3 Group North: 1989–90

=== Manager ===
Saint-Quentin

- Championnat National 3: 1995–96
