= Jean-François Beltramini =

French footballer (1948-2014)

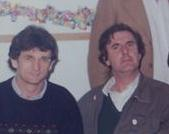
- Beltramini (left) with Bernard Menez

Personal information
- Date of birth: 5 February 1948
- Place of birth: Les Clayes-sous-Bois, France
- Date of death: 27 August 2014 (aged 66)
- Place of death: Les Clayes-sous-Bois, France
- Height: 1.74 m (5 ft 9 in)
- Position: Striker

Senior career*
Years	Team	Apps	(Gls)
1969–1973	CA Mantes	60	(23)
1973–1974	Reims II	4	(2)
1974–1975	Laval	25	(4)
1975–1979	Paris FC	124	(36)
1979–1981	Paris SG	33	(13)
1981–1985	Rouen	130	(54)
- * Club domestic league appearances and goals as of 30 August 2014

Jean-François Beltramini (5 February 1948 – 27 August 2014) was a French professional footballer who played as a striker.

== Career ==
Beltramini played for Division 2 sides CA Mantes, Reims, Laval and Paris FC with whom he first played in the Division 1 at 30 years. He then played at Paris Saint-Germain before also helping Rouen win promotion to France's top tier in 1982. He would go on to score 54 league goals for the club.
