= Bernard Bureau =

French footballer (born 1959)

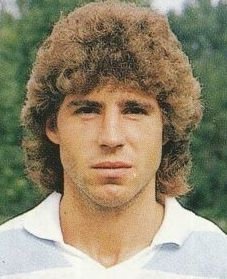
- Bureau with RC Paris (Note: In 1987, RC Paris was renamed to Matra Racing.) in 1987

Personal information
- Date of birth: 25 January 1959 (age 67)
- Place of birth: Lagny, France
- Height: 1.80 m (5 ft 11 in)
- Position: Forward

Youth career
- –1978: AS Chelles

Senior career*
Years	Team	Apps	(Gls)
1978–1981	Paris Saint-Germain	43	(11)
1981–1983	Brest	71	(16)
1983–1986	Lille	97	(24)
1986–1988	Matra Racing	32	(1)
1988–1990	Nancy	58	(12)
1990–1991	Reims	13	(0)
Total		304	(64)

International career
1983–1984	France Olympic	3	(0)
- * Club domestic league appearances and goals

Bernard Bureau (born 25 January 1959) is a French former professional footballer who played as a forward.

== Club career ==
Bureau is a youth graduate of AS Chelles. At age 19, a couple of months before joining Paris Saint-Germain in 1978, he was preparing for a culinary arts certificat d'aptitude professionnelle (CAP). In three seasons with PSG, he would make a total of 46 appearances and score 11 goals in all competitions. He continued his career at Brest, Lille, Matra Racing, Nancy, and Reims. At the end of his career, Bureau had made 304 league appearances and scored 64 goals, playing 10 of his 13 professional seasons in the Division 1, and the other 3 in the Division 2.

== International career ==
From 1983 to 1984, Bureau played for the France Olympic team. He would make a total of three appearances.

== Style of play ==
Bureau was described as a "racy" forward. He was an excellent header of the ball.

== After football ==
In 1991, Bureau retired from football; he subsequently went to live in the area of Nantes. He started a car cleaning company, and invested his capital in a night club called "Le Quai West". However, he would go back to one of his former passions, catering, in a restaurant in Nantes called “Aux délices de la pomme de terre”, before investing in real estate and apartment renovation in the Loire-Atlantique.

== Honours ==
Nancy

- Division 2: 1989–90
