= Francisco Rubio =

French footballer (born 1953)

Personal information
- Date of birth: 6 December 1953 (age 72)
- Place of birth: Saint-Amand-Montrond, France
- Position: Midfielder

Youth career
- 1964–1971: US Ainay le Château

Senior career*
Years	Team	Apps	(Gls)
1971–1975	Montluçon		
1975–1983	Nancy		
1983–1985	Marseille	64	(13)
1985–1987	Tours		
1990–1991	Joué-lès-Tours		

Managerial career
- 1995–1996: Fontainebleau
- * Club domestic league appearances and goals

Francisco "Paco" Rubio (born 6 December 1953) is a French former professional footballer who played as a midfielder.
