= Jean-Noël Huck =

French footballer and manager (born 1948)

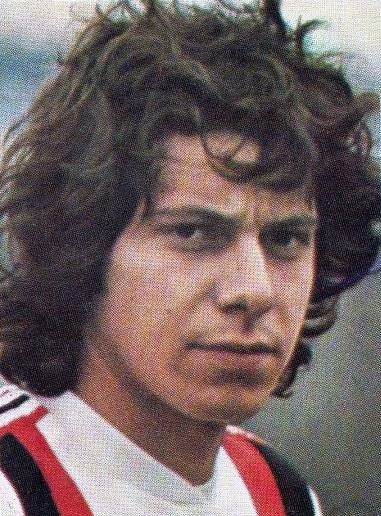
- Huck in 1976

Personal information
- Date of birth: 20 December 1948 (age 77)
- Place of birth: Mutzig, France
- Position: Midfielder

Youth career
- 1967–1968: Mutzig

Senior career*
Years	Team	Apps	(Gls)
1968–1971	Strasbourg	89	(8)
1971–1978	Nice	236	(28)
1978–1979	Paris FC	32	(1)
1979–1981	Paris Saint-Germain	60	(1)
1981–1984	Mulhouse		
1984–1985	Strasbourg	18	(0)
1986–1987	Guingamp	5	(0)

International career
1970–1975	France	17	(0)

Managerial career
- 1985: Strasbourg
- 1986: Guingamp
- 1990–1992: Nice
- * Club domestic league appearances and goals

Jean-Noël Huck (born 20 December 1948) is a French former professional football player and manager.

He is the father of another footballer, William Huck.
