= Jean-Claude Lemoult =

French footballer (born 1960)

Personal information
- Date of birth: 28 August 1960 (age 66)
- Place of birth: Neufchâteau, Vosges, France
- Height: 1.68 m (5 ft 6 in)
- Position: Midfielder

Youth career
- Chaumont

Senior career*
Years	Team	Apps	(Gls)
1976–1986	Paris Saint-Germain	217	(9)
1986–1991	Montpellier	160	(9)
1991–1993	Nîmes	43	(1)
Total		420	(19)

International career
1983	France	2	(0)
Medal record
Men's football
Representing France
Gold medal – first place	1984 Los Angeles	Team competition
- * Club domestic league appearances and goals

Jean-Claude Lemoult (born 28 August 1960) is a French former professional footballer who played as a midfielder.

Lemoult was a member of the French squad that won the gold medal at the 1984 Summer Olympics in Los Angeles.

== Honours ==
Montpellier

- Coupe de France: 1989–90
