= Boubacar Sarr =

Senegalese footballer

Personal information
- Date of birth: 20 July 1951 (age 75)
- Place of birth: Dakar, Senegal
- Height: 1.80 m (5 ft 11 in)
- Position: Striker

Youth career
- 1965–1973: Dial Diop

Senior career*
Years	Team	Apps	(Gls)
1973–1975	Toulon	65	(36)
1975–1979	Marseille	105	(36)
1976–1977	→ Cannes (loan)	32	(23)
1979–1983	Paris Saint-Germain	98	(27)
1983–1985	Marseille	33	(22)
1985–1987	Martigues	75	(31)
1987–1988	New Jersey City FC		
- * Club domestic league appearances and goals

Boubacar Sarr (born 20 July 1951) is a Senegalese former professional footballer who played as a striker. In France, he played for Toulon, Marseille, Cannes, Paris Saint-Germain and Martigues, and in the United States for New Jersey City FC.

== Personal life ==
Throughout his career he was referred to as Sarr Boubacar while his real name is Boubacar Sarr with "Sarr" being his surname. His nickname is "Locotte".

He is the father of the French youth footballer Mouhamadou-Naby Sarr.

== Honours ==
Marseille

- Coupe de France: 1975–76
- Division 2: 1983–84

Paris Saint-Germain

- Coupe de France: 1981–82, 1982–83
