= Francis Borelli =

French businessman (1932–2007)

- Born: 8 April 1932; El Kala, French Algeria
- Died: 2 October 2007 (aged 75); Verrières-le-Buisson, France
- Occupation: Businessman
- Known for: President of Paris Saint-Germain (1978–1991)

Francis Borelli (8 April 1932 – 2 October 2007) was a French businessman.

== Paris Saint-Germain ==
Borelli was the president of football club Paris Saint-Germain (PSG) from 1978 to 1991. He was described as the "most emblematic president" in the club's history. Under Borelli, PSG won its first Division 1 title, and its first two Coupe de France titles.

On 14 September 2008, the west stand of the Parc des Princes was renamed Tribune présidentielle Francis Borelli (transl. Francis Borelli presidential stand) in honour of him.
