= Gilles Cardinet =

French football player and manager (born 1962)

Personal information
- Date of birth: 18 March 1962 (age 64)
- Place of birth: Decize, France
- Height: 1.78 m (5 ft 10 in)
- Positions: Attacking midfielder; forward

Youth career
- 1976–1978: Paris Saint-Germain

Senior career*
Years	Team	Apps	(Gls)
1978–1983	Paris Saint-Germain B		
1979–1985	Paris Saint-Germain	13	(1)
1983–1984	→ Brest (loan)	2	(0)
1985–1989	Valenciennes	107	(6)
1989–1990	Poissy		
Total		122+	(7+)

Managerial career
- Valenciennes (assistant)
- Le Havre B
- * Club domestic league appearances and goals

Gilles Cardinet (born 18 March 1962) is a French former professional football player and manager.
