= Olympique Saint-Quentin =

French football club

- Full name: Olympique Saint-Quentinois
- Founded: 1920; 106 years ago
- Ground: Stade Paul Debrésie
- Capacity: 10,000
- Chairman: Marc Antonini
- Manager: Didier Dubois
- League: National 2 Group E
- 2023–24: National 2 Group D, 14th of 14 (relegated)
- Website: https://osqfootball.footeo.com
Home colours	Away colours

Olympique Saint-Quentinois (OSQ) is a French association football club based in Saint-Quentin, Picardy, in northern France. Founded in 1920, they are currently competing in the Championnat National 2, the fifth division of France, following relegation in 2024. They play at the Stade Paul Debrésie in Saint-Quentin, which has a capacity of 10,000.

== Current squad ==
As of 28 March 2019

Note: Flags indicate national team as defined under FIFA eligibility rules; some limited exceptions apply. Players may hold more than one non-FIFA nationality.

No.	Pos.	Nation	Player
—	GK	FRA	Valentin Prevost
—	GK	FRA	Alex Mendes
—	DF	FRA	Benjamin Pasguay
—	DF	FRA	Billy Modeste
—	DF	FRA	Romain Lefevre
—	DF	FRA	Ahmed Belfar
—	DF	MAR	Younes Bellali
—	DF	FRA	Loic Lonfier
—	MF	FRA	Azziz Belliche
—	MF	FRA	Anthony Boucher
—	MF	FRA	Martin Lucas
—	MF	FRA	Rachid Mourabit

No.	Pos.	Nation	Player
—	MF	FRA	Jordy Njike
—	MF	FRA	Bryan Soumaré
—	MF	FRA	Youssef Sylla
—	MF	FRA	Jessy Cambrone
—	MF	FRA	Ozcan Cetiner
—	MF	FRA	Melvyn Vercleyen
—	MF	FRA	Mehdi El Karkoub
—	FW	FRA	Mohamed Fall
—	FW	SEN	Sidy Niang
—	FW	FRA	Birama Dia
—	FW	FRA	Jordan Vercleyen
—	FW	FRA	Alfousseyni Jallow
