= Dominique Baratelli =

French footballer (born 1947)

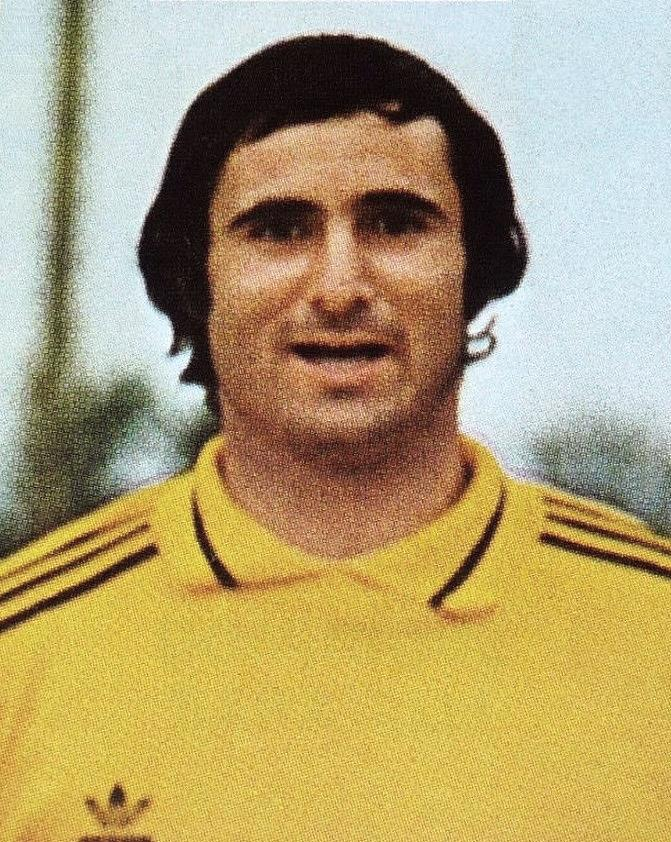
- Baratelli in 1975

Personal information
- Date of birth: 26 December 1947 (age 78)
- Place of birth: Nice, France
- Height: 1.77 m (5 ft 10 in)
- Position: Goalkeeper

Youth career
- 1962–1966: Nice

Senior career*
Years	Team	Apps	(Gls)
1967–1971	Ajaccio	107	(0)
1971–1978	Nice	247	(0)
1978–1985	Paris Saint-Germain	239	(0)
Total		593	(0)

International career
1968–1970	France U21	25	(0)
1972–1982	France	21	(0)
- * Club domestic league appearances and goals

Dominique Baratelli (born 26 December 1947) is a French former professional footballer who played as a goalkeeper.

== Career ==
Born in Nice, Baratelli started his footballing career with Cavigal Nice and turned professional in 1967 when switching to then-first-division side AC Ajaccio. He transferred to OGC Nice in 1971, where he stayed until 1978 and earned his first France caps. He was nominated in the France 1978 and 1982 World Cup squads but played only part of one first-round match, in 1978 against Argentina (1–2), in which he was substituted in for injured starter Jean-Paul Bertrand-Demanes on 55 minutes.

In 1978, Baratelli moved to Paris Saint-Germain where he won the French Cup in 1982 and 1983 and ended his professional career in 1985. Today, Dominique Baratelli is a youth football coach for the city of Cagnes-sur-Mer in southern France.

He played 21 times for France and was called another 25 times as a backup goalkeeper. He played 593 French first-division matches (the fourth-highest all-time total) in which he scored two goals.
