= Robert Wurtz (referee) =

French former football referee (born 1941)

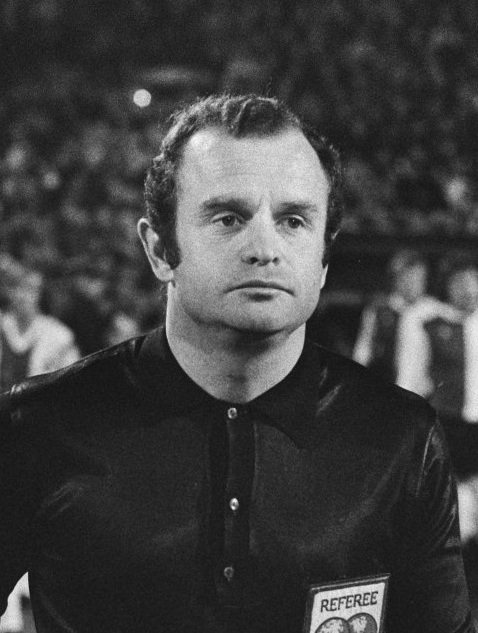
Wurtz in 1976

Robert Charles Paul Wurtz (French pronunciation: [ʁɔbɛʁ ʃaʁl pɔl vyʁts]; born 16 December 1941) is a French former football referee who was active in the 1970s and 1980s. He was elected by journalists "French referee of the year" in 1971, 1974, 1975, 1977 and 1978. He supervised the 1977 European Cup Final and 2 matches in the 1978 FIFA World Cup.

Wurtz was born in Strasbourg and as a youth hoped to play for RC Strasbourg. He refereed his first Division 1 match in 1969, and his career ended with a Division 2 match in 1990. He supervised a total of 450 Division 1 matches. Remembered for his theatrical and flamboyant style, he was called "the Nijinsky of the whistle" by Brazilian newspaper O Globo.

Between 1998 and 2007, Wurtz appeared as a referee in Intervilles, the French TV show that was adapted as It's a Knockout in Britain.

== Honours ==
Orders

- Knight of the Legion of Honour: 2001
