= Jean-Marc Pilorget =

French football player and manager (born 1958)

Personal information
- Date of birth: 13 April 1958 (age 68)
- Place of birth: Paris, France
- Height: 1.80 m (5 ft 11 in)
- Position: Defender

Youth career
- 1967–1975: Morangis-Chilly

Senior career*
Years	Team	Apps	(Gls)
1975–1989	Paris Saint-Germain	371	(14)
1987–1988	→ Cannes (loan)	29	(2)
1989–1990	Guingamp		
1990–1991	Stade Raphaëlois		

International career
1977	France U21		

Managerial career
- 1990–1992: Stade Raphaëlois
- 1992–1993: Marseille Endoume
- 1994–1997: Fréjus
- 1998–2003: Viry-Châtillon
- 2005–2007: Paris FC
- 2007–2008: Romorantin
- 2008–2009: Paris FC
- 2012–2014: Cannes
- 2015: Stade Raphaëlois
- * Club domestic league appearances and goals

Jean-Marc Pilorget (born 13 April 1958) is a French former professional football player and manager. He held the record of the most appearances for Paris Saint-Germain, with 435 matches, until 2024.

== Club career ==
Pilorget was born in Paris and initially played at youth level for Morangis-Chilly before joining Paris Saint-Germain in 1975. He made his competitive debut for the club on 21 December 1975 against Stade de Reims. In the following years, he established himself as a regular defensive player and remained associated with the club for an unusually long period. With PSG, he won the Coupe de France in 1982 and 1983, as well as the French championship in 1986.

Pilorget played a particularly important role in the first major title win in the club's history. In the final of the 1982 Coupe de France against AS Saint-Étienne, he scored the decisive penalty in the shoot-out, securing the cup victory for PSG and the club's first major trophy.

In total, Pilorget made 371 league appearances for Paris Saint-Germain and scored 14 goals; across all competitions, he is credited with 435 competitive appearances for the club. He also made 12 appearances in European competitions. In the 1987–88 season, he was loaned to AS Cannes. After leaving PSG, he played for EA Guingamp from 1989 to 1990 and subsequently for Stade Raphaëlois.

== International career ==
Pilorget played for the France under-21 national team in 1977, making four appearances. He did not make an appearance for the French senior national team. In the early 1980s, he was at times part of the wider national team setup, but was set back for an extended period by a serious car accident during the 1983–84 season, not playing for 18 months after this.

== Managerial career ==
After the end of his playing career, Pilorget worked as a coach in French football. His first position was with US Endoume in 1992–93. Pilorget coached Paris FC in 2008, and was fired on 29 September 2009. He managed Championnat de France Amateur side Cannes until June 2015, when he took over Fréjus Saint-Raphael.
