= Georges Peyroche =

French football player and manager (born 1937)

Personal information
- Date of birth: 27 January 1937 (age 89)
- Place of birth: Roche-la-Molière, France
- Height: 1.73 m (5 ft 8 in)
- Position: Striker

Senior career*
Years	Team	Apps	(Gls)
1955–1961	Saint-Étienne	159	(23)
1961–1963	Strasbourg	56	(10)
1963–1965	Stade Français	59	(12)
1965–1967	Lille	67	(10)
1967–1969	Nîmes	43	(6)
Total		384	(61)

International career
1960–1961	France	3	(0)

Managerial career
- 1969–1970: Gallia Lunel
- 1970–1972: Périgueux
- 1972–1973: Fossemagne
- 1973–1976: Lille
- 1979: Périgueux
- 1979: Mouloudia Oujda
- 1979–1983: Paris Saint-Germain
- 1984–1985: Paris Saint-Germain
- 1987–1988: Stade Quimpérois
- 1988–1991: Valenciennes
- 1991: Trélissac
- * Club domestic league appearances and goals

Georges Peyroche (born 27 January 1937) is a French football player and manager.
