= Marcel Bacou =

French football referee (1936–2010)

- Born: 3 March 1936; Tours, France
- Died: 14 March 2010 (aged 74)

Domestic
Years	League	Role
1970–1983	Division 1	Referee

International
Years	League	Role
1980–1983	FIFA listed	Referee

Marcel Bacou (3 March 1936 – 14 March 2010) was a French football referee.

== Career ==
Bacou was born in Tours, France. He officiated three international friendly matches between 1980 and 1983.

In club football, he officiated some UEFA competition matches, such as two in the UEFA Champions League and one in the UEFA Cup. He refereed 231 Division 1 matches between 1970 and 1983.

== Personal life and death ==
Bacou was an activist of Unión de Asociaciones Familiares (UNAF). He died on 14 March 2010, at the age of 74, due to an illness.
