= 1977–78 Paris Saint-Germain FC season =

8th season of Paris Saint-Germain FC

Paris Saint-Germain
1977–78 season
- President: Daniel Hechter; Francis Borelli
- Manager: Jean-Michel Larqué
- Stadium: Parc des Princes; Stade Bauer
- Ligue 1: 11th
- Coupe de France: Round of 32
- Top goalscorer: League: Carlos Bianchi (37); All: Carlos Bianchi (39)
- Average home league attendance: 21,754
Home colours	Away colours	Third colours

The 1977–78 season was the 8th season in the history of Paris Saint-Germain FC. PSG played most of their home league matches at the Parc des Princes, while also hosting one match at the Stade Bauer, attracting an average of 21,754 spectators per match. The club's president was Daniel Hechter until January 1978, when Francis Borelli replaced him. The team was managed by player-coach Jean-Michel Larqué. Mustapha Dahleb served as captain. PSG finished eleventh in Ligue 1 and reached the round of 32 in the Coupe de France. Carlos Bianchi was the team's top scorer, netting 39 goals in all competitions, including 37 in the league.

== Players ==
=== Squad ===
Players who featured in at least one official match for the club.

Note: Flags indicate national team as defined under FIFA eligibility rules; some limited exceptions apply. Players may hold more than one non-FIFA nationality.

No.	Pos.	Nation	Player
—	GK	FRA	Daniel Bernard
—	GK	FRA	Michel Bensoussan
—	DF	FRA	Jean-Pierre Adams
—	DF	ARG	Ramón Heredia
—	DF	FRA	Pierre Bajoc
—	DF	FRA	Éric Renaut
—	DF	FRA	Thierry Morin
—	DF	FRA	Jean-Marc Pilorget
—	DF	FRA	Franck Tanasi
—	DF	FRA	Gilles Brisson
—	DF	FRA	Philippe Jean
—	DF	FRA	Dominique Lokoli

No.	Pos.	Nation	Player
—	MF	FRA	Jean-Claude Lemoult
—	MF	FRA	Bernard Moraly
—	MF	FRA	Lionel Justier
—	MF	ALG	Mustapha Dahleb (captain)
—	MF	FRA	Jacques Laposte
—	MF	FRA	Jean-Michel Larqué (player-coach)
—	FW	FRA	François Brisson
—	FW	ARG	Carlos Bianchi
—	FW	FRA	Philippe Redon
—	FW	CGO	François M'Pelé
—	FW	FRA	Mario Mongelli
—	FW	FRA	Hervé Porquet

=== Out on loan ===
Players who were loaned out to other clubs during the season.

Note: Flags indicate national team as defined under FIFA eligibility rules; some limited exceptions apply. Players may hold more than one non-FIFA nationality.

No. / Pos. / Nation / Player; — / FW / FRA / Guy Nosibor (at Angoulême)	No. / Pos. / Nation / Player; — / FW / CMR / Jean-Pierre Tokoto (at Bordeaux)

== Transfers ==
=== Arrivals ===
Players who signed for the club.

Note: Flags indicate national team as defined under FIFA eligibility rules; some limited exceptions apply. Players may hold more than one non-FIFA nationality.

No.	Pos.	Nation	Player
—	GK	FRA	Daniel Bernard (from Rennes)
—	DF	FRA	Jean-Pierre Adams (from Nice)
—	DF	ARG	Ramón Heredia (from Atlético Madrid)
—	DF	FRA	Philippe Jean (from US Palaiseau)
—	DF	FRA	Franck Tanasi (from PSG Youth Academy)

No.	Pos.	Nation	Player
—	MF	FRA	Jean-Michel Larqué (from Saint-Étienne)
—	MF	FRA	Jean-Claude Lemoult (from Chaumont)
—	FW	ARG	Carlos Bianchi (from Reims)
—	FW	FRA	Mario Mongelli (from Morangis-Chilly)
—	FW	FRA	Hervé Porquet (from PSG Youth Academy)

=== Departures ===
Players who left the club.

Note: Flags indicate national team as defined under FIFA eligibility rules; some limited exceptions apply. Players may hold more than one non-FIFA nationality.

No.	Pos.	Nation	Player
—	GK	FRA	Ilija Pantelić (Retired)
—	DF	FRA	Denis Bauda (to Poissy)
—	DF	FRA	Gérard Cenzato (to Paris FC)
—	DF	POR	Humberto Coelho (to Benfica)
—	DF	FRA	Jacky Novi (to Strasbourg)

No.	Pos.	Nation	Player
—	MF	FRA	Dominique Barberat (to Rouen)
—	MF	FRA	Francis Piasecki (to Strasbourg)
—	FW	ALG	Mohamed Ali Messaoud (to Alès)
—	FW	FRA	Christian André (to Béziers)

== Kits ==
RTL was the shirt sponsor, and Pony was the kit supplier.

Home	Away	Third

== Competitions ==
=== Overview ===
Competition	First match	Last match	Starting round	Final position	Record							
Competition	First match	Last match	Starting round	Final position	Pld	W	D	L	GF	GA	GD	Win %
Ligue 1	3 August 1977	4 May 1978	Matchday 1	11th	38	14	8	16	75	66	+9	36.84
Coupe de France	29 January 1978	26 February 1978	Round of 64	Round of 32	3	1	1	1	6	5	+1	33.33
Total					41	15	9	17	81	71	+10	36.59

Source: Competitions

=== Ligue 1 ===
==== League table ====
Pos	Team	Pld	W	D	L	GF	GA	GD	Pts
9	Sochaux	38	15	10	13	65	54	+11	40
10	Laval	38	15	7	16	50	58	−8	37
11	Paris Saint-Germain	38	14	8	16	75	66	+9	36
12	Metz	38	13	9	16	41	57	−16	35
13	Nîmes	38	11	11	16	49	63	−14	33

Source: Histoire du PSG
Rules for classification: 1) points; 2) goal difference; 3) number of goals scored.
Victory: 2 points, Draw: 1 point, Defeat: 0 points

==== Results by round ====
Round	1	2	3	4	5	6	7	8	9	10	11	12	13	14	15	16	17	18	19	20	21	22	23	24	25	26	27	28	29	30	31	32	33	34	35	36	37	38
Ground	A	H	A	H	A	H	A	H	A	H	A	H	A	H	A	H	A	A	H	A	H	A	H	A	H	A	H	A	H	A	H	A	H	A	H	H	A	H
Result	L	D	D	L	L	W	W	W	W	L	L	W	L	D	L	W	L	D	D	D	D	W	W	L	W	L	L	W	L	L	W	W	W	D	W	L	L	L
Position	17	17	17	18	20	17	14	12	9	11	13	9	9	10	10	9	10	12	10	10	10	12	10	11	11	11	12	11	11	12	11	10	10	11	10	11	11	11

Source: Histoire du PSG
A = Away; H = Home; W = Win; D = Draw; L = Loss

==== Matches ====
3 August 1977 1	Nancy	4–1	Paris Saint-Germain	Tomblaine
	Platini 4' (pen.); Renaut 48' (o.g.); Curbelo 59'; Pokou 62'	Report	Bianchi 28'	Stadium: Stade Marcel Picot; Attendance: 24,161; Referee: Franck Leloup

9 August 1977 2	Paris Saint-Germain	2–2	Reims	Paris
	Bianchi 3', 17'	Report	Coste 19'; Cuperly 88'	Stadium: Parc des Princes; Attendance: 35,767; Referee: Achille Verbecke

16 August 1977 3	Strasbourg	1–1	Paris Saint-Germain	Strasbourg
	Vergnes 5'	Report	Dahleb 78'	Stadium: Stade de la Meinau; Attendance: 25,810; Referee: Marcel Bacou

19 August 1977 4	Paris Saint-Germain	1–2	Bordeaux	Paris
	M'Pelé 35'	Report	Barthou 6', 19'	Stadium: Parc des Princes; Attendance: 21,096; Referee: Robert Frauciel

30 August 1977 5	Marseille	2–1	Paris Saint-Germain	Marseille
	Berdoll 35'; Florès 67'	Report	Bianchi 89' (pen.)	Stadium: Stade Vélodrome; Attendance: 24,303; Referee: Alain Delmer

2 September 1977 6	Paris Saint-Germain	2–0	Valenciennes	Paris
	Wraży 33' (o.g.); Renaut 44'	Report		Stadium: Parc des Princes; Attendance: 24,434; Referee: Jean-Claude Martin

9 September 1977 7	Rouen	1–3	Paris Saint-Germain	Le Petit-Quevilly
	Pilorget 90' (o.g.)	Report	M'Pelé 26'; Bianchi 77'; Dahleb 85'	Stadium: Stade Robert Diochon; Attendance: 17,585; Referee: René Vigliani

17 September 1977 8	Paris Saint-Germain	2–0	Metz	Paris
	Redon 30'; Heredia 65'	Report		Stadium: Parc des Princes; Attendance: 24,501; Referee: Georges Konrath

23 September 1977 9	Lyon	2–3	Paris Saint-Germain	Lyon
	Lacombe 74' (pen.); Gallice 82'	Report	Lokoli 7'; Bianchi 19', 54'	Stadium: Stade de Gerland; Attendance: 10,291; Referee: Alain Delmer

1 October 1977 10	Paris Saint-Germain	0–3	Nice	Paris
		Report	Jouve 12'; Bjeković 34'; Katalinski 65'	Stadium: Parc des Princes; Attendance: 40,264; Referee: Michel Vautrot

11 October 1977 11	Nantes	3–1	Paris Saint-Germain	Nantes
	Bargas 40'; Amisse 54'; Van Straelen 76'	Report	Bianchi 30'	Stadium: Stade Marcel-Saupin; Attendance: 15,185; Referee: Michel Kitabdjian

14 October 1977 12	Paris Saint-Germain	8–2	Troyes	Paris
	Bianchi 5', 41', 74', 77'; Pilorget 8'; M'Pelé 23', 65'; Renaut 49'	Report	Jacques 35'; Diallo 63' (pen.)	Stadium: Parc des Princes; Attendance: 9,380; Referee: Marcel Bacou

28 October 1977 14	Paris Saint-Germain	2–2	Laval	Paris
	Bianchi 42'; Redon 78'	Report	Camara 61'; Di Caro 67'	Stadium: Parc des Princes; Attendance: 22,584; Referee: Alain Delmer

4 November 1977 13	Nîmes	2–1	Paris Saint-Germain	Nîmes
	Domarski 52'; Sanlaville 90'	Report	Dahleb 50'	Stadium: Stade Jean-Bouin; Attendance: 6,478; Referee: Marc Buils

9 November 1977 16	Paris Saint-Germain	4–1	Saint-Étienne	Paris
	Dahleb 13', 19', 66'; Bianchi 77'	Report	Barthélémy 9'	Stadium: Parc des Princes; Attendance: 37,426; Referee: Achille Verbecke

19 November 1977 17	Lens	3–1	Paris Saint-Germain	Lens
	Marx 9', 77'; Sab 62'	Report	Bianchi 18'	Stadium: Stade Bollaert-Delelis; Attendance: 14,640; Referee: Jean-Claude Martin

26 November 1977 18	Monaco	0–0	Paris Saint-Germain	Monaco
		Report		Stadium: Stade Louis II; Attendance: 2,906; Referee: Michel Vautrot

30 November 1977 19	Paris Saint-Germain	3–3	Bastia	Paris
	Bianchi 16', 56'; Brisson 76'	Report	Rep 65', 82'; Papi 73' (pen.)	Stadium: Parc des Princes; Attendance: 22,872; Referee: Marc Buils

3 December 1977 20	Reims	0–0	Paris Saint-Germain	Reims
		Report		Stadium: Stade Auguste-Delaune; Attendance: 5,014; Referee: René Vigliani

11 December 1977 21	Paris Saint-Germain	2–2	Strasbourg	Paris
	Bianchi 48' (pen.), 50'	Report	Tanter 71', 76'	Stadium: Parc des Princes; Attendance: 20,173; Referee: Michel Kitabdjian

14 December 1977 15	Sochaux	2–1	Paris Saint-Germain	Montbéliard
	Posca 16'; Pintenat 86' (pen.)	Report	Bianchi 8'	Stadium: Stade Auguste-Bonal; Attendance: 3,895; Referee: Robert Wurtz

17 December 1977 22	Bordeaux	1–2	Paris Saint-Germain	Bordeaux
	Buigues 12'	Report	Dahleb 60'; Porquet 85'	Stadium: Stade Chaban-Delmas; Attendance: 7,511; Referee: Achille Verbecke

8 January 1978 23	Paris Saint-Germain	5–1	Marseille	Paris
	Brisson 29'; Dahleb 44'; Trésor 46' (o.g.); M'Pelé 49' (pen.), 82'	Report	Sarr 12' (pen.)	Stadium: Parc des Princes; Attendance: 33,386; Referee: Robert Wurtz

14 January 1978 24	Valenciennes	2–1	Paris Saint-Germain	Valenciennes
	Zaremba 15', 62'	Report	Bianchi 4'	Stadium: Stade Nungesser; Attendance: 4,642; Referee: René Vigliani

24 January 1978 25	Paris Saint-Germain	3–1	Rouen	Paris
	Bianchi 23', 35', 52'	Report	Peña 31'	Stadium: Parc des Princes; Attendance: 11,212; Referee: Jean-Marie Meeus

4 February 1978 26	Metz	2–1	Paris Saint-Germain	Metz
	Battiston 28', 63' (pen.)	Report	Dahleb 44'	Stadium: Stade Saint-Symphorien; Attendance: 9,080; Referee: Achille Verbecke

12 February 1978 27	Paris Saint-Germain	2–3	Lyon	Paris
	Bianchi 56'; Redon 84'	Report	Spiegel 70' (pen.); Attar 73'; Chiesa 85'	Stadium: Parc des Princes; Attendance: 10,348; Referee: Franck Leloup

15 February 1978 28	Nice	2–3	Paris Saint-Germain	Nice
	Bjeković 43'; Morin 81' (o.g.)	Report	Brisson 20'; Ascery 28' (o.g.); Redon 80'	Stadium: Stade du Ray; Attendance: 6,462; Referee: Alain Delmer

4 March 1978 30	Troyes	3–1	Paris Saint-Germain	Troyes
	Diallo 28'; Raulin 80'; Verstraete 82'	Report	Renaut 36'	Stadium: Stade de l'Aube; Attendance: 5,599; Referee: Michel Vautrot

11 March 1978 31	Paris Saint-Germain	5–0	Nîmes	Paris
	Bianchi 5', 17', 82'; Brisson 8'; Porquet 42'	Report		Stadium: Parc des Princes; Attendance: 8,965; Referee: Marcel Bacou

25 March 1978 32	Laval	1–2	Paris Saint-Germain	Laval
	Keruzoré 35' (pen.)	Report	Redon 15'; Bianchi 59'	Stadium: Stade Francis Le Basser; Attendance: 7,971; Referee: Marc Buils

28 March 1978 29	Paris Saint-Germain	0–1	Nantes	Paris
		Report	Pécout 45'	Stadium: Parc des Princes; Attendance: 33,597; Referee: André Jourdain

5 April 1978 33	Paris Saint-Germain	3–1	Sochaux	Paris
	Bianchi 57', 61', 81'	Report	Ivezić 66'	Stadium: Parc des Princes; Attendance: 8,352; Referee: Achille Verbecke

8 April 1978 34	Saint-Étienne	1–1	Paris Saint-Germain	Saint-Étienne
	Revelli 24'	Report	Bianchi 57'	Stadium: Stade Geoffroy-Guichard; Attendance: 20,399; Referee: Franck Leloup

21 April 1978 35	Paris Saint-Germain	2–1	Lens	Paris
	Adams 54'; M'Pelé 72'	Report	Six 77'	Stadium: Parc des Princes; Attendance: 11,241; Referee: Michel Vautrot

25 April 1978 36	Paris Saint-Germain	1–2	Monaco	Paris
	Bianchi 31'	Report	Vitalis 2'; Nogués 41'	Stadium: Parc des Princes; Attendance: 32,440; Referee: Guy Mouchotte

2 May 1978 38	Paris Saint-Germain	1–2	Nancy	Saint-Ouen-sur-Seine
	Bianchi 87'	Report	Jeannol 25'; Platini 70'	Stadium: Stade Bauer; Attendance: 5,289; Referee: Ange Rancelli

4 May 1978 37	Bastia	5–3	Paris Saint-Germain	Furiani
	Papi 36', 42'; Rep 68'; De Zerbi 75'; Félix 88'	Report	Pilorget 28'; Bianchi 61', 80'	Stadium: Stade Armand-Cesari; Attendance: 2,934; Referee: Alain Delmer

=== Coupe de France ===
==== Round of 64 ====
29 January 1978 Single leg	Paris Saint-Germain	2–0	Toulon	Narbonne
	Bianchi 4'; M'Pelé 44'	Report		Stadium: Stade Cassayet; Attendance: 4,655; Referee: Gabriel Besory

==== Round of 32 ====
18 February 1978 First leg	Nice	2–1	Paris Saint-Germain	Nice
	Bjeković 51'; Sanchez 56'	Report	Adams 85'	Stadium: Stade du Ray; Attendance: 6,288; Referee: Jean-Claude Martin

26 February 1978 Second leg	Paris Saint-Germain	3–3 (a.e.t.) (4–5 agg.)	Nice	Paris
	Bianchi 20'; M'Pelé 63'; Brisson 115'	Report	Ascery 88'; Sanchez 98', 114'	Stadium: Parc des Princes; Attendance: 33,101; Referee: Georges Konrath

== Statistics ==
=== Appearances and goals ===
23 players featured in at least one official match, and the club scored 81 goals in official competitions, including three own goals.

Rank	Player	Position	Appearances	Goals	Source
1	(Argentina) Carlos Bianchi	FW	41	39	
2	(France) Philippe Redon	FW	41	5	
3	(France) Jean-Marc Pilorget	DF	39	2	
4	(Republic of the Congo) François M'Pelé	FW	38	9	
5	(France) François Brisson	FW	36	5	
6	(France) Éric Renaut	DF	36	3	
7	(France) Daniel Bernard	GK	32	0	
8	(France) Dominique Lokoli	DF	31	1	
9	(France) Thierry Morin	DF	30	0	
10	(Algeria) Mustapha Dahleb	MF	27	9	
11	(France) Jean-Pierre Adams	DF	25	2	
12	(Argentina) Ramón Heredia	DF	23	1	
13	(France) Lionel Justier	MF	13	0	
14	(France) Jean-Claude Lemoult	MF	11	0	
15	(France) Bernard Moraly	MF	11	0	
16	(France) Pierre Bajoc	DF	9	0	
17	(France) Michel Bensoussan	GK	9	0	
18	(France) Philippe Jean	DF	9	0	
19	(France) Hervé Porquet	FW	8	2	
20	(France) Gilles Brisson	DF	8	0	
21	(France) Jean-Michel Larqué	MF	5	0	
22	(Cameroon) Jean-Pierre Tokoto	FW	1	0	
23	(France) Franck Tanasi	DF	1	0	
