= 1978–79 Paris Saint-Germain FC season =

9th season of Paris Saint-Germain FC

Paris Saint-Germain
1978–79 season
- President: Francis Borelli
- Manager: Jean-Michel Larqué; Pierre Alonzo; Velibor Vasović
- Stadium: Parc des Princes; Stade Bauer
- Ligue 1: 13th
- Coupe de France: Round of 32
- Top goalscorer: League: Carlos Bianchi (27); All: Carlos Bianchi (32)
- Average home league attendance: 18,550
Home colours	Away colours

The 1978–79 season was the 9th season in the history of Paris Saint-Germain FC. PSG played most of their home league matches at the Parc des Princes, while also hosting two matches at the Stade Bauer, attracting an average of 18,550 spectators per match. The club's president was Francis Borelli. The team was managed by player-coach Jean-Michel Larqué until August 1978, when Pierre Alonzo took over. Alonzo was replaced by Velibor Vasović in November 1978. Dominique Bathenay served as captain. PSG finished 13th in Ligue 1 and reached the round of 32 in the Coupe de France. Carlos Bianchi was the team's top scorer, netting 32 goals in all competitions, including 27 in the league.

== Players ==
=== Squad ===
Players who featured in at least one official match for the club.

Note: Flags indicate national team as defined under FIFA eligibility rules; some limited exceptions apply. Players may hold more than one non-FIFA nationality.

No.	Pos.	Nation	Player
—	GK	FRA	Dominique Baratelli
—	DF	FRA	Dominique Bathenay (captain)
—	DF	FRA	Jean-Pierre Adams
—	DF	ARG	Ramón Heredia
—	DF	FRA	Pierre Bajoc
—	DF	FRA	Éric Renaut
—	DF	FRA	Thierry Morin
—	DF	FRA	Jean-Marc Pilorget
—	DF	FRA	Franck Tanasi
—	DF	FRA	Philippe Jean
—	DF	FRA	Dominique Lokoli
—	DF	FRA	Philippe Col
—	MF	FRA	Jean-Claude Lemoult

No.	Pos.	Nation	Player
—	MF	FRA	Luis Fernandez
—	MF	ALG	Mustapha Dahleb
—	MF	FRA	Jacques Laposte
—	MF	FRA	Jean-François Douis
—	MF	ITA	Armando Bianchi
—	MF	FRA	Jean-Michel Larqué (player-coach)
—	FW	FRA	François Brisson
—	FW	ARG	Carlos Bianchi
—	FW	FRA	Guy Nosibor
—	FW	CGO	François M'Pelé
—	FW	FRA	Bernard Bureau
—	FW	FRA	Mario Mongelli
—	FW	FRA	Hervé Porquet

=== Out on loan ===
Players who were loaned out to other clubs during the season.

Note: Flags indicate national team as defined under FIFA eligibility rules; some limited exceptions apply. Players may hold more than one non-FIFA nationality.

No. / Pos. / Nation / Player; — / GK / FRA / Michel Bensoussan (at Paris FC)	No. / Pos. / Nation / Player; — / MF / FRA / Lionel Justier (at Paris FC)

== Transfers ==
=== Arrivals ===
Players who signed for the club.

Note: Flags indicate national team as defined under FIFA eligibility rules; some limited exceptions apply. Players may hold more than one non-FIFA nationality.

No.	Pos.	Nation	Player
—	GK	FRA	Dominique Baratelli (from Nice)
—	GK	FRA	Franck Mérelle (from PSG Youth Academy)
—	GK	FRA	Denis Troch (from Red Star)
—	DF	FRA	Dominique Bathenay (from Saint-Étienne)
—	DF	FRA	Philippe Col (from Red Star)
—	MF	ITA	Armando Bianchi (from Rouen)

No.	Pos.	Nation	Player
—	MF	FRA	Jean-François Douis (from Rouen)
—	MF	FRA	Luis Fernandez (from Saint-Priest)
—	FW	FRA	Bernard Bureau (from PSG Youth Academy)
—	FW	FRA	Guy Nosibor (from Angoulême, end of loan)
—	FW	CMR	Jean-Pierre Tokoto (from Bordeaux, end of loan)

=== Departures ===
Players who left the club.

Note: Flags indicate national team as defined under FIFA eligibility rules; some limited exceptions apply. Players may hold more than one non-FIFA nationality.

No.	Pos.	Nation	Player
—	GK	FRA	Daniel Bernard (to Brest)
—	DF	FRA	Gilles Brisson (to Toulouse)
—	MF	FRA	Bernard Moraly (to Paris FC)

No.	Pos.	Nation	Player
—	FW	FRA	Philippe Redon (to Bordeaux)
—	FW	CMR	Jean-Pierre Tokoto (to Béziers)

== Kits ==
RTL was the shirt sponsor, and Le Coq Sportif was the kit supplier.

Home	Away

== Competitions ==
=== Overview ===
Competition	First match	Last match	Starting round	Final position	Record							
Competition	First match	Last match	Starting round	Final position	Pld	W	D	L	GF	GA	GD	Win %
Ligue 1	19 July 1978	1 June 1979	Matchday 1	13th	38	14	8	16	59	66	−7	36.84
Coupe de France	11 February 1979	25 March 1979	Round of 64	Round of 32	3	1	0	2	8	7	+1	33.33
Total					41	15	8	18	67	73	−6	36.59

Source: Competitions

=== Ligue 1 ===
==== League table ====
Pos	Team	Pld	W	D	L	GF	GA	GD	Pts
11	Nancy	38	15	8	15	77	61	+16	38
12	Marseille	38	12	13	13	50	55	−5	37
13	Paris Saint-Germain	38	14	8	16	59	66	−7	36
14	Bastia	38	13	9	16	53	65	−12	35
15	Nice	38	11	10	17	58	75	−17	32

Source: Histoire du PSG
Rules for classification: 1) points; 2) goal difference; 3) number of goals scored.
Victory: 2 points, Draw: 1 point, Defeat: 0 points

==== Results by round ====
Round	1	2	3	4	5	6	7	8	9	10	11	12	13	14	15	16	17	18	19	20	21	22	23	24	25	26	27	28	29	30	31	32	33	34	35	36	37	38
Ground	A	H	A	H	A	H	A	H	A	H	A	H	A	H	H	A	H	A	H	A	H	A	H	A	H	A	H	A	H	A	H	A	A	H	A	H	A	H
Result	L	L	W	D	L	D	W	D	D	W	L	W	L	W	D	L	L	L	W	L	W	L	L	D	D	L	D	W	W	L	W	L	L	W	W	W	L	W
Position	19	19	18	15	17	17	14	14	14	11	13	11	12	11	11	12	15	15	14	14	13	14	14	14	14	15	15	14	14	14	14	14	14	14	14	13	14	13

Source: Histoire du PSG
A = Away; H = Home; W = Win; D = Draw; L = Loss

==== Matches ====
19 July 1978 1	Reims	2–0	Paris Saint-Germain	Reims
	Santamaría 59'; Pérignon 70'	Report		Stadium: Stade Auguste-Delaune; Attendance: 12,039; Referee: Michel Kitabdjian

25 July 1978 2	Paris Saint-Germain	0–2	Metz	Saint-Ouen-sur-Seine
		Report	Synaeghel 24'; Zali 54'	Stadium: Stade Bauer; Attendance: 17,001; Referee: Jean-Marie Meeus

28 July 1978 3	Nîmes	1–2	Paris Saint-Germain	Nîmes
	Boyron 8'	Report	Bathenay 31'; Bianchi 49'	Stadium: Stade Jean-Bouin; Attendance: 7,830; Referee: Alain Delmer

2 August 1978 4	Paris Saint-Germain	0–0	Lille	Paris
		Report		Stadium: Parc des Princes; Attendance: 18,983; Referee: René Vigliani

8 August 1978 5	Bordeaux	2–0	Paris Saint-Germain	Bordeaux
	Giresse 42'; Vukotić 72'	Report		Stadium: Stade Chaban-Delmas; Attendance: 17,989; Referee: Michel Vautrot

18 August 1978 6	Paris Saint-Germain	2–2	Paris FC	Paris
	Bianchi 16' (pen.); Renaut 52'	Report	Lech 48'; Zlatarić 59'	Stadium: Parc des Princes; Attendance: 24,274; Referee: Robert Wurtz

22 August 1978 7	Nice	1–3	Paris Saint-Germain	Nice
	Buscher 73'	Report	M'Pelé 18'; Bianchi 66'; Barraja 85' (o.g.)	Stadium: Stade du Ray; Attendance: 12,908; Referee: Georges Konrath

25 August 1978 8	Paris Saint-Germain	1–1	Saint-Étienne	Paris
	Bathenay 39'	Report	Rocheteau 37'	Stadium: Parc des Princes; Attendance: 45,833; Referee: Marc Buils

5 September 1978 9	Angers	2–2	Paris Saint-Germain	Angers
	Ameršek 19'; Brulez 77'	Report	M'Pelé 72', 85'	Stadium: Stade Raymond Kopa; Attendance: 8,628; Referee: Guy Mouchotte

8 September 1978 10	Paris Saint-Germain	4–0	Bastia	Paris
	Bianchi 33', 60'; Pilorget 39'; Renaut 57'	Report		Stadium: Parc des Princes; Attendance: 30,596; Referee: Michel Kitabdjian

19 September 1978 11	Sochaux	2–1	Paris Saint-Germain	Montbéliard
	Ivezić 30' (pen.); Revelli 36'	Report	Bianchi 3'	Stadium: Stade Auguste-Bonal; Attendance: 8,073; Referee: Achille Verbecke

22 September 1978 12	Paris Saint-Germain	2–0	Valenciennes	Paris
	Bianchi 45', 63'	Report		Stadium: Parc des Princes; Attendance: 14,638; Referee: Marcel Bacou

30 September 1978 13	Marseille	4–1	Paris Saint-Germain	Marseille
	Linderoth 21'; Sarr 46'; Buigues 56'; Florès 86' (pen.)	Report	Bianchi 83'	Stadium: Stade Vélodrome; Attendance: 9,295; Referee: Alain Delmer

11 October 1978 14	Paris Saint-Germain	2–1	Nancy	Paris
	Bathenay 32'; Bianchi 89' (pen.)	Report	Neubert 76'	Stadium: Parc des Princes; Attendance: 16,021; Referee: Franck Leloup

14 October 1978 15	Paris Saint-Germain	1–1	Nantes	Paris
	Bianchi 68'	Report	Amisse 62'	Stadium: Parc des Princes; Attendance: 27,911; Referee: Michel Kitabdjian

21 October 1978 16	Lyon	4–2	Paris Saint-Germain	Lyon
	Carrié 22'; Valadier 58', 72'; Xuereb 78'	Report	Bianchi 65'; Dahleb 69'	Stadium: Stade de Gerland; Attendance: 15,879; Referee: Marc Buils

27 October 1978 17	Paris Saint-Germain	1–2	Laval	Paris
	Bianchi 30'	Report	Lechantre 72'; Giachetti 82'	Stadium: Parc des Princes; Attendance: 14,392; Referee: Georges Konrath

4 November 1978 18	Monaco	2–1	Paris Saint-Germain	Monaco
	Nogués 54'; Onnis 65'	Report	Dahleb 14'	Stadium: Stade Louis II; Attendance: 3,539; Referee: Michel Vautrot

14 November 1978 19	Paris Saint-Germain	2–1	Strasbourg	Paris
	M'Pelé 47'; Bianchi 65'	Report	Specht 22'	Stadium: Parc des Princes; Attendance: 43,805; Referee: Franck Leloup

17 November 1978 20	Metz	2–1	Paris Saint-Germain	Metz
	Kasperczak 45'; Diallo 53'	Report	Dahleb 80'	Stadium: Stade Saint-Symphorien; Attendance: 10,885; Referee: Guy Mouchotte

26 November 1978 21	Paris Saint-Germain	3–2	Nîmes	Paris
	Bureau 17', 29'; Bathenay 19'	Report	Castagnino 9'; Marguerite 68'	Stadium: Parc des Princes; Attendance: 14,093; Referee: Achille Verbecke

2 December 1978 22	Lille	3–1	Paris Saint-Germain	Lille
	Cabral 23'; Olarević 66' (pen.); Pleimelding 69'	Report	Bianchi 70'	Stadium: Stade Grimonprez-Jooris; Attendance: 10,894; Referee: Michel Kitabdjian

10 December 1978 23	Paris Saint-Germain	2–5	Bordeaux	Paris
	Bianchi 34', 41'	Report	Vergnes 32', 67', 72', 86'; Van Straelen 50'	Stadium: Parc des Princes; Attendance: 15,375; Referee: René Vigliani

17 December 1978 24	Paris FC	1–1	Paris Saint-Germain	Paris
	Alberto 88'	Report	Bianchi 56'	Stadium: Parc des Princes; Attendance: 21,996; Referee: Henri Didier

28 January 1979 25	Paris Saint-Germain	1–1	Nice	Paris
	Pilorget 70'	Report	Cappadona 31'	Stadium: Parc des Princes; Attendance: 15,298; Referee: Ottorino Di Bernardo

4 February 1979 26	Saint-Étienne	4–1	Paris Saint-Germain	Saint-Étienne
	Pilorget 5' (o.g.); Santini 9'; Lacombe 24'; Repellini 58'	Report	Bureau 35'	Stadium: Stade Geoffroy-Guichard; Attendance: 21,309; Referee: Alain Delmer

18 February 1979 27	Paris Saint-Germain	1–1	Angers	Saint-Ouen-sur-Seine
	Bianchi 12'	Report	Gonfalone 72'	Stadium: Stade Bauer; Attendance: 5,366; Referee: René Vigliani

2 March 1979 28	Bastia	1–2	Paris Saint-Germain	Furiani
	Papi 87'	Report	Bianchi 37'; Dahleb 50'	Stadium: Stade Armand-Cesari; Attendance: 2,563; Referee: Guy Mouchotte

20 March 1979 29	Paris Saint-Germain	3–1	Sochaux	Paris
	M'Pelé 12'; Bianchi 47' (pen.); Lemoult 88'	Report	Genghini 89'	Stadium: Parc des Princes; Attendance: 13,388; Referee: Ange Rancelli

28 March 1979 30	Valenciennes	1–0	Paris Saint-Germain	Valenciennes
	Schall 25'	Report		Stadium: Stade Nungesser; Attendance: 3,089; Referee: Michel Kitabdjian

7 April 1979 31	Paris Saint-Germain	4–3	Marseille	Paris
	Bureau 5'; Dahleb 55'; A. Bianchi 57' (pen.); C. Bianchi 86'	Report	Berdoll 2', 77'; Buigues 73'	Stadium: Parc des Princes; Attendance: 13,707; Referee: Achille Verbecke

20 April 1979 32	Nancy	2–1	Paris Saint-Germain	Tomblaine
	Neubert 10'; Platini 87'	Report	Bathenay 5'	Stadium: Stade Marcel Picot; Attendance: 5,635; Referee: Jean-Marie Meeus

27 April 1979 33	Nantes	1–0	Paris Saint-Germain	Nantes
	Amisse 70'	Report		Stadium: Stade Marcel-Saupin; Attendance: 10,918; Referee: Michel Kitabdjian

5 May 1979 34	Paris Saint-Germain	2–1	Lyon	Paris
	Bathenay 11'; Bianchi 66'	Report	Martinez 60'	Stadium: Parc des Princes; Attendance: 7,410; Referee: Achille Verbecke

18 May 1979 35	Laval	2–3	Paris Saint-Germain	Laval
	Delamontagne 88' (pen.); Coste 90'	Report	Dahleb 18'; Bureau 22'; Bianchi 72'	Stadium: Stade Francis Le Basser; Attendance: 7,099; Referee: René Vigliani

25 May 1979 36	Paris Saint-Germain	3–0	Monaco	Paris
	Bianchi 8', 28', 57'	Report		Stadium: Parc des Princes; Attendance: 10,296; Referee: Georges Konrath

29 May 1979 37	Strasbourg	3–0	Paris Saint-Germain	Strasbourg
	Marx 1'; Wagner 18'; Gemmrich 58'	Report		Stadium: Stade de la Meinau; Attendance: 29,790; Referee: René Vigliani

1 June 1979 38	Paris Saint-Germain	3–2	Reims	Paris
	Bianchi 33'; Brisson 51', 67'	Report	Michelberger 49'; Bertolino 61'	Stadium: Parc des Princes; Attendance: 4,815; Referee: Guy Mouchotte

=== Coupe de France ===
==== Round of 64 ====
11 February 1979 Single leg	Paris Saint-Germain	6–1	La Roche	Montaigu-de-Quercy
	Dahleb 44', 48'; A. Bianchi 50' (pen.); C. Bianchi 60', 69', 78'	Report	Grellier 71'	Stadium: Stade Municipal; Attendance: 6,282; Referee: Jean-Claude Boyer

==== Round of 32 ====
9 March 1979 First leg	Monaco	2–1	Paris Saint-Germain	Monaco
	Barral 23'; Emon 41'	Report	Bianchi 73'	Stadium: Stade Louis II; Attendance: 3,174; Referee: Michel Vautrot

25 March 1979 Second leg	Paris Saint-Germain	1–4 (2–6 agg.)	Monaco	Paris
	Bianchi 34'	Report	Emon 13'; Onnis 54'; Moizan 83'; Soler 84'	Stadium: Parc des Princes; Attendance: 29,931; Referee: Ottorino Di Bernardo

== Statistics ==
=== Appearances and goals ===
26 players featured in at least one official match, and the club scored 67 goals in official competitions, including one own goal.

Rank	Player	Position	Appearances	Goals	Source
1	(France) Dominique Bathenay	DF	41	6	
2	(France) Dominique Baratelli	GK	41	0	
3	(Argentina) Carlos Bianchi	FW	39	32	
4	(France) Jean-Marc Pilorget	DF	39	2	
5	(France) Éric Renaut	DF	36	2	
6	(France) Dominique Lokoli	DF	32	0	
7	(Italy) Armando Bianchi	MF	30	3	
8	(Republic of the Congo) François M'Pelé	FW	26	5	
9	(France) François Brisson	FW	24	2	
10	(France) Philippe Col	DF	24	0	
11	(Algeria) Mustapha Dahleb	MF	23	8	
12	(France) Thierry Morin	DF	21	0	
13	(France) Jean-Michel Larqué	MF	20	0	
14	(France) Bernard Bureau	FW	19	5	
15	(France) Jean-Claude Lemoult	MF	18	1	
16	(France) Jean-Pierre Adams	DF	18	0	
17	(France) Jean-François Douis	MF	12	0	
18	(France) Jacques Laposte	MF	11	0	
19	(France) Luis Fernandez	MF	7	0	
20	(France) Philippe Jean	DF	5	0	
21	(France) Pierre Bajoc	DF	3	0	
22	(France) Guy Nosibor	FW	3	0	
23	(France) Hervé Porquet	FW	2	0	
24	(Argentina) Ramón Heredia	DF	1	0	
25	(France) Mario Mongelli	FW	1	0	
26	(France) Franck Tanasi	DF	1	0	
