= 1976–77 Paris Saint-Germain FC season =

7th season of Paris Saint-Germain FC

Paris Saint-Germain
1976–77 season
- President: Daniel Hechter
- Manager: Velibor Vasović; Ilija Pantelić
- Stadium: Parc des Princes; Stade Bauer
- Ligue 1: 9th
- Coupe de France: Round of 16
- Top goalscorer: League: Mustapha Dahleb (22); All: Mustapha Dahleb (26)
- Average home league attendance: 22,700
Home colours	Away colours	Third colours

The 1976–77 season was the 7th season in the history of Paris Saint-Germain FC. PSG played most of their home league matches at the Parc des Princes, while also hosting one match at the Stade Bauer, attracting an average of 22,700 spectators per match. The club's president was Daniel Hechter. The team was managed by Velibor Vasović until May 1977, when Ilija Pantelić took over. Mustapha Dahleb served as captain. PSG finished ninth in Ligue 1 and reached the round of 16 in the Coupe de France. Dahleb was the team's top scorer, netting 26 goals in all competitions, including 22 in the league.

== Players ==
=== Squad ===
Players who featured in at least one official match for the club.

Note: Flags indicate national team as defined under FIFA eligibility rules; some limited exceptions apply. Players may hold more than one non-FIFA nationality.

No.	Pos.	Nation	Player
—	GK	YUG	Ilija Pantelić
—	GK	FRA	Michel Bensoussan
—	DF	POR	Humberto Coelho
—	DF	FRA	Jacky Novi
—	DF	FRA	Pierre Bajoc
—	DF	FRA	Éric Renaut
—	DF	FRA	Gérard Cenzato
—	DF	FRA	Thierry Morin
—	DF	FRA	Jean-Marc Pilorget
—	DF	FRA	Dominique Lokoli
—	MF	FRA	Denis Bauda
—	MF	FRA	Bernard Moraly

No.	Pos.	Nation	Player
—	MF	FRA	Francis Piasecki
—	MF	FRA	Lionel Justier
—	MF	ALG	Mustapha Dahleb (captain)
—	MF	FRA	Jacques Laposte
—	FW	FRA	François Brisson
—	FW	FRA	Guy Nosibor
—	FW	ALG	Mohamed Ali Messaoud
—	FW	FRA	Philippe Redon
—	FW	CMR	Jean-Pierre Tokoto
—	FW	CGO	François M'Pelé
—	FW	FRA	Christian André

== Transfers ==
=== Arrivals ===
Players who signed for the club.

Note: Flags indicate national team as defined under FIFA eligibility rules; some limited exceptions apply. Players may hold more than one non-FIFA nationality.

No.	Pos.	Nation	Player
—	DF	FRA	Éric Renaut (from Sochaux, end of loan)
—	DF	FRA	Gilles Brisson (from AS Bourg-la-Reine)
—	FW	FRA	Christian André (from Red Star, end of loan)

No.	Pos.	Nation	Player
—	FW	ALG	Mohamed Ali Messaoud (from Hamra Annaba)
—	FW	FRA	Philippe Redon (from Rennes)

=== Departures ===
Players who left the club.

Note: Flags indicate national team as defined under FIFA eligibility rules; some limited exceptions apply. Players may hold more than one non-FIFA nationality.

No.	Pos.	Nation	Player
—	DF	FRA	Jacky Bade (Retired)
—	DF	FRA	Dominique Berthaud (to Angoulême)
—	DF	FRA	Louis Cardiet (to US Berné)
—	DF	FRA	André Travetto (to Aix)
—	MF	FRA	Bernard Dumot (to Orléans)

No.	Pos.	Nation	Player
—	MF	FRA	Robin Leclerc (Free agent)
—	FW	FRA	Jean-Pierre Dogliani (Retired)
—	FW	TOG	Pierre-Antoine Dossevi (to Tours)
—	FW	FRA	Louis Floch (to Brest)

== Kits ==
RTL was the shirt sponsor, and Le Coq Sportif was the kit supplier.

Home 1	Home 2	Away	Third

== Competitions ==
=== Overview ===
Competition	First match	Last match	Starting round	Final position	Record							
Competition	First match	Last match	Starting round	Final position	Pld	W	D	L	GF	GA	GD	Win %
Ligue 1	6 August 1976	8 June 1977	Matchday 1	9th	38	17	8	13	65	55	+10	44.74
Coupe de France	13 February 1977	13 April 1977	Round of 64	Round of 16	5	4	0	1	14	5	+9	80.00
Total					43	21	8	14	79	60	+19	48.84

Source: Competitions

=== Ligue 1 ===
==== League table ====
Pos	Team	Pld	W	D	L	GF	GA	GD	Pts
7	Nice	38	19	6	13	60	54	+6	44
8	Metz	38	17	9	12	67	54	+13	43
9	Paris Saint-Germain	38	17	8	13	65	55	+10	42
10	Bordeaux	38	15	8	15	66	57	+9	38
11	Reims	38	12	12	14	53	60	−7	36

Source: Histoire du PSG
Rules for classification: 1) points; 2) goal difference; 3) number of goals scored.
Victory: 2 points, Draw: 1 point, Defeat: 0 points

==== Results by round ====
Round	1	2	3	4	5	6	7	8	9	10	11	12	13	14	15	16	17	18	19	20	21	22	23	24	25	26	27	28	29	30	31	32	33	34	35	36	37	38
Ground	H	A	H	A	A	H	H	A	H	A	H	A	H	A	H	A	H	A	H	H	A	H	H	A	A	H	A	H	A	H	A	H	A	H	A	H	A	A
Result	L	L	W	L	L	D	W	D	W	D	W	L	W	D	W	L	L	W	W	W	W	W	D	L	W	W	L	L	L	D	L	W	L	W	W	W	D	D
Position	18	18	13	15	20	17	17	16	11	13	10	7	10	10	7	10	14	12	8	6	6	6	5	6	7	7	7	9	10	10	10	10	10	9	9	9	9	9

Source: Histoire du PSG
A = Away; H = Home; W = Win; D = Draw; L = Loss

==== Matches ====
6 August 1976 1	Paris Saint-Germain	2–4	Lyon	Saint-Ouen-sur-Seine
	Dahleb 5' (pen.); Piasecki 82'	Report	Mariot 1', 68'; Lacombe 54'; Spiegel 56'	Stadium: Stade Bauer; Attendance: 8,905; Referee: Alain Delmer

13 August 1976 2	Nice	1–0	Paris Saint-Germain	Nice
	Toko 79'	Report		Stadium: Stade du Ray; Attendance: 15,950; Referee: Marcel Bacou

18 August 1976 3	Paris Saint-Germain	2–0	Nancy	Paris
	M'Pelé 37'; Dahleb 50'	Report		Stadium: Parc des Princes; Attendance: 15,794; Referee: Robert Héliès

27 August 1976 4	Laval	2–1	Paris Saint-Germain	Laval
	Vergnes 26'; Lhoste 72'	Report	M'Pelé 75' (pen.)	Stadium: Stade Francis Le Basser; Attendance: 9,851; Referee: René Vigliani

7 September 1976 5	Nîmes	3–0	Paris Saint-Germain	Nîmes
	Dussaud 23', 70'; Girard 63'	Report		Stadium: Stade Jean-Bouin; Attendance: 5,913; Referee: Franck Leloup

10 September 1976 6	Paris Saint-Germain	2–2	Bastia	Paris
	Dahleb 2'; M'Pelé 35' (pen.)	Report	Džajić 31' (pen.); Félix 52'	Stadium: Parc des Princes; Attendance: 20,205; Referee: Robert Wurtz

18 September 1976 7	Paris Saint-Germain	2–1	Reims	Paris
	M'Pelé 31'; Dahleb 57'	Report	Bonnec 37'	Stadium: Parc des Princes; Attendance: 18,065; Referee: Georges Konrath

24 September 1976 8	Lens	3–3	Paris Saint-Germain	Lens
	Janković 5' (pen.), 17', 84' (pen.)	Report	Redon 11'; Dahleb 12', 55'	Stadium: Stade Bollaert-Delelis; Attendance: 20,447; Referee: Robert Héliès

2 October 1976 9	Paris Saint-Germain	2–0	Saint-Étienne	Paris
	M'Pelé 28' (pen.); Dahleb 61'	Report		Stadium: Parc des Princes; Attendance: 46,565; Referee: René Vigliani

15 October 1976 10	Nantes	3–3	Paris Saint-Germain	Nantes
	Rampillon 64', 85'; Amisse 72'	Report	Coelho 38'; Dahleb 49'; Piasecki 63'	Stadium: Stade Marcel-Saupin; Attendance: 17,410; Referee: Robert Frauciel

23 October 1976 11	Paris Saint-Germain	2–1	Bordeaux	Paris
	Dahleb 10'; Piasecki 56'	Report	Giresse 30' (pen.)	Stadium: Parc des Princes; Attendance: 18,535; Referee: Marcel Bacou

6 November 1976 13	Paris Saint-Germain	2–1	Troyes	Paris
	M'Pelé 45'; Piasecki 81'	Report	Tota 12'	Stadium: Parc des Princes; Attendance: 11,693; Referee: Franck Leloup

20 November 1976 15	Paris Saint-Germain	3–1	Metz	Paris
	M'Pelé 13', 26'; Laposte 14'	Report	Müller 71'	Stadium: Parc des Princes; Attendance: 24,472; Referee: Michel Vautrot

24 November 1976 12	Marseille	2–1	Paris Saint-Germain	Marseille
	Bracci 32'; Zlatarić 89'	Report	Baulier 17' (o.g.)	Stadium: Stade Vélodrome; Attendance: 13,024; Referee: Jean-Claude Martin

27 November 1976 16	Lille	2–0	Paris Saint-Germain	Lille
	Simon 41'; Parizon 65'	Report		Stadium: Stade Grimonprez-Jooris; Attendance: 6,490; Referee: Robert Wurtz

5 December 1976 17	Paris Saint-Germain	1–2	Valenciennes	Paris
	Redon 79'	Report	Mušović 7'; Six 37'	Stadium: Parc des Princes; Attendance: 11,305; Referee: Robert Héliès

11 December 1976 18	Angers	0–2	Paris Saint-Germain	Angers
		Report	Redon 17'; Piasecki 58'	Stadium: Stade Raymond Kopa; Attendance: 3,991; Referee: Jean-Marie Meeus

15 December 1976 14	Sochaux	1–1	Paris Saint-Germain	Montbéliard
	Djaadaoui 55'	Report	Piasecki 40'	Stadium: Stade Auguste-Bonal; Attendance: 2,646; Referee: Robert Frauciel

19 December 1976 19	Paris Saint-Germain	3–1	Rennes	Paris
	Tokoto 2'; Piasecki 34'; Dahleb 58'	Report	Tonnel 4'	Stadium: Parc des Princes; Attendance: 23,583; Referee: Michel Kitabdjian

9 January 1977 20	Paris Saint-Germain	3–0	Nice	Paris
	Piasecki 47'; M'Pelé 85', 87'	Report		Stadium: Parc des Princes; Attendance: 34,213; Referee: Georges Konrath

16 January 1977 21	Nancy	1–2	Paris Saint-Germain	Tomblaine
	Rouyer 90'	Report	Lokoli 17'; Dahleb 75'	Stadium: Stade Marcel Picot; Attendance: 13,302; Referee: Achille Verbecke

23 January 1977 22	Paris Saint-Germain	5–0	Laval	Paris
	M'Pelé 35'; Dahleb 53', 71'; Tokoto 67'; Laposte 88'	Report		Stadium: Parc des Princes; Attendance: 34,174; Referee: Alain Delmer

30 January 1977 23	Paris Saint-Germain	0–0	Nîmes	Paris
		Report		Stadium: Parc des Princes; Attendance: 34,549; Referee: Marcel Bacou

5 February 1977 24	Bastia	5–2	Paris Saint-Germain	Furiani
	Félix 4', 42'; Zimako 33', 65'; Papi 86'	Report	Laposte 68'; Dahleb 79'	Stadium: Stade Armand-Cesari; Attendance: 6,946; Referee: Michel Kitabdjian

18 February 1977 25	Reims	2–3	Paris Saint-Germain	Reims
	Schaller 46'; Bianchi 56'	Report	Piasecki 26'; Redon 29'; Dahleb 53'	Stadium: Stade Auguste-Delaune; Attendance: 10,668; Referee: Guy Mouchotte

27 February 1977 26	Paris Saint-Germain	3–1	Lens	Paris
	Dahleb 26', 85'; Piasecki 69'	Report	Marx 90'	Stadium: Parc des Princes; Attendance: 39,842; Referee: Georges Konrath

5 March 1977 27	Saint-Étienne	1–0	Paris Saint-Germain	Saint-Étienne
	Bathenay 89'	Report		Stadium: Stade Geoffroy-Guichard; Attendance: 19,391; Referee: Robert Héliès

23 March 1977 28	Paris Saint-Germain	0–1	Nantes	Paris
		Report	Pécout 35'	Stadium: Parc des Princes; Attendance: 45,540; Referee: Franck Leloup

2 April 1977 29	Bordeaux	5–2	Paris Saint-Germain	Bordeaux
	Lattuada 22'; Jeandupeux 41', 64'; Barthou 66'; Buigues 75'	Report	Piasecki 17'; Dahleb 34'	Stadium: Stade Chaban-Delmas; Attendance: 10,259; Referee: Michel Kitabdjian

16 April 1977 30	Paris Saint-Germain	1–1	Marseille	Paris
	Tokoto 72'	Report	Florès 23'	Stadium: Parc des Princes; Attendance: 14,803; Referee: Achille Verbecke

28 April 1977 31	Troyes	2–1	Paris Saint-Germain	Troyes
	Zorzetto 8'; Diallo 64'	Report	Dahleb 5'	Stadium: Stade de l'Aube; Attendance: 8,001; Referee: Guy Mouchotte

3 May 1977 32	Paris Saint-Germain	1–0	Sochaux	Paris
	Tokoto 78'	Report		Stadium: Parc des Princes; Attendance: 7,945; Referee: Robert Héliès

7 May 1977 33	Metz	3–1	Paris Saint-Germain	Metz
	Curioni 13', 32'; Braun 71'	Report	Dahleb 41'	Stadium: Stade Saint-Symphorien; Attendance: 10,698; Referee: Franck Leloup

21 May 1977 34	Paris Saint-Germain	2–1	Lille	Paris
	Dahleb 33'; Renaut 73'	Report	Karasi 44' (pen.)	Stadium: Parc des Princes; Attendance: 9,291; Referee: Jean-Claude Martin

27 May 1977 35	Valenciennes	0–3	Paris Saint-Germain	Valenciennes
		Report	M'Pelé 60', 81', 88'	Stadium: Stade Nungesser; Attendance: 5,530; Referee: Gabriel Besory

1 June 1977 36	Paris Saint-Germain	2–0	Angers	Paris
	M'Pelé 33'; Justier 79'	Report		Stadium: Parc des Princes; Attendance: 6,561; Referee: Michel Kitabdjian

4 June 1977 37	Rennes	1–1	Paris Saint-Germain	Rennes
	Guermeur 68' (pen.)	Report	Tokoto 51'	Stadium: Roazhon Park; Attendance: 5,258; Referee: Ottorino Di Bernardo

8 June 1977 38	Lyon	1–1	Paris Saint-Germain	Lyon
	Chiesa 18'	Report	Dahleb 29'	Stadium: Stade de Gerland; Attendance: 5,593; Referee: Alain Delmer

=== Coupe de France ===
==== Round of 64 ====
13 February 1977 Single leg	Paris Saint-Germain	7–1	Fontainebleau	Paris
	Dahleb 39' (pen.), 48', 56', 75'; Piasecki 41'; M'Pelé 53', 82'	Report	Russail 85'	Stadium: Parc des Princes; Attendance: 14,957; Referee: René Vigliani

==== Round of 32 ====
12 March 1977 First leg	Caen	0–2	Paris Saint-Germain	Caen
		Report	Tokoto 47'; Ali Messaoud 62'	Stadium: Stade de Venoix; Attendance: 11,589; Referee: Jean-Marie Meeus

19 March 1977 Second leg	Paris Saint-Germain	3–2 (5–2 agg.)	Caen	Paris
	M'Pelé 27', 40'; Tokoto 30'	Report	Bouffandeau 75'; Marie 80'	Stadium: Parc des Princes; Attendance: 5,468; Referee: Alain Delmer

==== Round of 16 ====
8 April 1977 First leg	Sochaux	1–0	Paris Saint-Germain	Montbéliard
	Soler 9'	Report		Stadium: Stade Auguste-Bonal; Attendance: 6,307; Referee: Marcel Bacou

13 April 1977 Second leg	Paris Saint-Germain	2–1 (2–2 (a) agg.)	Sochaux	Paris
	Tokoto 9', 14'	Report	Renaut 40' (o.g.)	Stadium: Parc des Princes; Attendance: 15,000; Referee: Robert Wurtz

== Statistics ==
=== Appearances and goals ===
23 players featured in at least one official match, and the club scored 79 goals in official competitions, including one own goal.

Rank	Player	Position	Appearances	Goals	Source
1	(Algeria) Mustapha Dahleb	MF	42	26	
2	(France) Jacky Novi	DF	42	0	
3	(France) Dominique Lokoli	DF	40	1	
4	(France) Jean-Marc Pilorget	DF	39	0	
5	(France) Francis Piasecki	MF	38	12	
6	(Republic of the Congo) François M'Pelé	FW	37	19	
7	(France) Jacques Laposte	MF	37	3	
8	(France) Éric Renaut	DF	35	1	
9	(France) Philippe Redon	FW	34	4	
10	(Socialist Federal Republic of Yugoslavia) Ilija Pantelić	GK	27	0	
11	(Cameroon) Jean-Pierre Tokoto	FW	26	9	
12	(France) Denis Bauda	MF	22	0	
13	(France) Lionel Justier	MF	21	1	
14	(France) Michel Bensoussan	GK	16	0	
15	(France) Gérard Cenzato	DF	12	0	
16	(Portugal) Humberto Coelho	DF	9	1	
17	(France) Bernard Moraly	MF	9	0	
18	(Algeria) Mohamed Ali Messaoud	FW	7	1	
19	(France) François Brisson	FW	7	0	
20	(France) Guy Nosibor	FW	4	0	
21	(France) Thierry Morin	DF	3	0	
22	(France) Christian André	FW	2	0	
23	(France) Pierre Bajoc	DF	1	0	
