= Jean-François Douis =

French footballer (born 1950)

Personal information
- Date of birth: 3 May 1950 (age 76)
- Place of birth: Écouis, France
- Height: 1.75 m (5 ft 9 in)
- Positions: Midfielder; forward

Senior career*
Years	Team	Apps	(Gls)
1968–1971	Rouen	35	(8)
1971–1977	Nice	105	(4)
1977–1978	Rouen	33	(1)
1978–1979	Paris Saint-Germain	12	(0)
Total		185	(13)
- * Club domestic league appearances and goals

Jean-François Douis (born 3 May 1950) is a French former professional footballer who played as a midfielder and forward.

== Personal life ==
Jean-François Douis is the younger brother of former France international Yvon Douis.

After retiring from football in 1979, Douis became a commercial agent for Adidas and Le Coq Sportif for 20 years. In 1999, he became a physical educator in the town of Saint-Médard-en-Jalles.

== Career statistics ==
Appearances and goals by club, season and competition
Club	Season	League			Cup		Continental		Total	
Club	Season	Division	Apps	Goals	Apps	Goals	Apps	Goals	Apps	Goals
Rouen	1968–69	Division 1	9	3	1	0	—		10	3
Rouen	1969–70	Division 1	24	4	1	0	5 (Note: Appearances in the Inter-Cities Fairs Cup)	0	30	4
Rouen	1970–71	Division 2	2	1	1	0	—		3	1
Rouen	Total		35	8	3	0	5	0	43	8
Nice	1971–72	Division 1	12	0	4	1	—		16	1
Nice	1972–73	Division 1	7	2	0	0	—		7	2
Nice	1973–74	Division 1	7	0	1	0	0	0	8	0
Nice	1974–75	Division 1	17	0	1	0	—		18	0
Nice	1975–76	Division 1	32	1	2	0	—		34	1
Nice	1976–77	Division 1	30	1	7	0	2 (Note: Appearances in the UEFA Cup)	0	39	1
Nice	Total		105	4	15	1	2	0	122	5
Rouen	1977–78	Division 1	33	1	1	0	—		34	1
Paris Saint-Germain	1978–79	Division 1	12	0	0	0	—		12	0
Career total			185	13	19	1	7	0	211	14
