= Ottmann =

Ottmann is a surname. Notable people with the surname include:

- Klaus Ottmann, German writer and curator
- Patrick Ottmann, French footballer
- Henry Ottmann, French painter

== See also ==
- Bentley–Ottmann algorithm, mathematical algorithm
- Ottman, surname
