= Posca (disambiguation) =

Posca was a popular drink in ancient Rome and Greece.

Posca may also refer to:

- Posca (Rome character), a fictional character in the HBO/BBC television series Rome
- POSCA, a marker pen made by uni-ball
- Jean-Pierre Posca, a French professional footballer
