= Philippe Jean (footballer) =

French footballer (born 1959)

Personal information
- Date of birth: 27 May 1959 (age 67)
- Place of birth: Antony, France
- Positions: Midfielder; defender

Youth career
- US Palaiseau
- Paris Saint-Germain

Senior career*
Years	Team	Apps	(Gls)
1977–1979	Paris Saint-Germain	14	(0)
1979–1982	Paris FC	29	(1)
1982–1983	Viry-Châtillon	33	(2)
Total		76	(3)

Managerial career
- Club Sportif d'Igny
- * Club domestic league appearances and goals

Philippe Jean (born 27 May 1959) is a French former professional footballer who played as a midfielder and defender.

== Club career ==
Jean started off his career firstly at US Palaiseau, and then later in the academy of Paris Saint-Germain. He made his first appearance for PSG on 26 November 1977 in a 0–0 draw against Monaco. Jean made his final appearance for the club in a 1–0 loss against Nantes on 27 April 1979. After playing a total of 14 games across 2 years for PSG, he joined Paris FC.

Jean spent three seasons at Paris FC before transferring over to Viry-Châtillon for the final season of his career.

== International career ==
Jean was a cadet and youth international for France.

== After football ==
Jean retired from football in 1983, at the age of 24. Later on in his life, he became the manager of Club Sportif d'Igny before becoming the president of Les Ulis.

== Career statistics ==
Appearances and goals by club, season and competition
Club	Season	League			Cup		Total	
Club	Season	Division	Apps	Goals	Apps	Goals	Apps	Goals
Paris Saint-Germain	1977–78	Division 1	9	0	0	0	9	0
Paris Saint-Germain	1978–79	Division 1	5	0	0	0	5	0
Paris Saint-Germain	Total		14	0	0	0	14	0
Paris FC	1979–80	Division 2	0	0	3	0	3	0
Paris FC	1980–81	Division 2	23	1	1	0	24	1
Paris FC	1981–82	Division 2	6	0	0	0	6	0
Paris FC	Total		29	1	4	0	33	1
Viry-Châtillon	1982–83	Division 2	33	2	1	0	34	2
Career total			76	3	5	0	81	3
