= Mario Mongelli =

French football player and manager (born 1958)

Personal information
- Date of birth: 20 October 1958 (age 68)
- Place of birth: Villejuif, France
- Height: 1.75 m (5 ft 9 in)
- Positions: Forward; midfielder

Youth career
- 1972–1977: Morangis-Chilly
- 1977–1978: Paris Saint-Germain

Senior career*
Years	Team	Apps	(Gls)
1978–1979	Paris Saint-Germain	1	(0)
1979–1981	Paris FC	46	(6)
1981–1983	Fontainebleau	63	(11)
1983–1984	Dunkerque	14	(1)
1985–1986	Paris FC		
1987–1988	Morangis-Chilly		
Total		124+	(18+)

Managerial career
- 1987–1988: Morangis-Chilly
- 1993–2005: Morangis-Chilly
- * Club domestic league appearances and goals

Mario Mongelli (born 20 October 1958) is a French former professional football player and manager.

== Playing career ==
Mongelli was an exponent of the Paris Saint-Germain Academy. He played his first and only match for the Paris Saint-Germain senior team on 4 February 1979, a 4–1 loss against Saint-Étienne. He was substituted at the 77th minute of the match, and never played for PSG again in his career. In the summer of 1979, he joined Paris FC.

In the next 9 years of his career, Mongelli went on to play for Fontainebleau, Dunkerque, Paris FC (for a second time), and Morangis-Chilly. In his one season at Morangis-Chilly, he had the role of player-manager.

== Post-playing career ==
Mongelli went on to coach Morangis-Chilly for 12 years from 1993 to 2005, while at the same time being a player for the "veterans" team of the club. After leaving in 2005, he began a scooter company called "Aux 4M" that he ran with his brother in the town of Chilly-Mazarin.

== Career statistics ==
Appearances and goals by club, season and competition
Club	Season	League			Cup		Total	
Club	Season	Division	Apps	Goals	Apps	Goals	Apps	Goals
Paris Saint-Germain	1978–79	Division 1	1	0	0	0	1	0
Paris FC	1979–80	Division 2	31	6	7	1	38	7
Paris FC	1980–81	Division 2	15	0	0	0	15	0
Paris FC	Total		46	6	7	1	53	7
Fontainebleau	1981–82	Division 2	33	8	3	1	36	9
Fontainebleau	1982–83	Division 2	30	3	0	0	30	3
Fontainebleau	Total		63	11	3	1	66	12
Dunkerque	1983–84	Division 2	14	1	0	0	14	1
Career total			124	18	10	2	134	20
