= Ottman =

Ottman is a surname. Notable people with the surname include:

- Ali Ottman (born 1987), Arab-Israeli footballer
- Bill Ottman (born 1985), American Internet entrepreneur
- Fred Ottman (born 1956), American wrestler
- Jacquelyn Ottman (born 1955), American writer
- John Ottman (born 1964), American film composer and editor
- Kris Ottman Neville (1925–1980), American science fiction writer
- Pepper Ottman, American politician
- Bill Ottman, American entrepreneur

== See also ==
- Ottman Corners, Wisconsin, is an unincorporated community located in the town of Trimbelle, Pierce County, Wisconsin, United States
- Ottman-Murray Beach, is a hamlet in the Canadian province of Saskatchewan
- Ottmann, surname
