= 1976–77 French Division 1 =

39th season of French Division 1

Division 1
- Season: 1976–77
- Dates: 6 August 1976 – 8 June 1977
- Champions: Nantes (4th title)
- Relegated: Angers; Lille; Rennes
- European Cup: Nantes
- Cup Winners' Cup: Saint-Étienne
- UEFA Cup: Lens; Bastia
- Matches: 380
- Goals: 1,125 (2.96 per match)
- Top goalscorer: Carlos Bianchi (28 goals)

FC Nantes won Division 1 season 1976/1977 of the French Association Football League with 58 points.

== Participating teams ==
- Angers SCO
- SEC Bastia
- Bordeaux
- Stade Lavallois
- RC Lens
- Lille
- Olympique Lyonnais
- Olympique de Marseille
- FC Metz
- AS Nancy
- FC Nantes
- OGC Nice
- Nîmes Olympique
- Paris Saint-Germain FC
- Stade de Reims
- Stade Rennais FC
- AS Saint-Étienne
- FC Sochaux-Montbéliard
- Troyes AF
- US Valenciennes-Anzin
Location of teams in 1976–77 Division 1

== League table ==
Pos	Team	Pld	W	D	L	GF	GA	GD	Pts	Qualification or relegation
1	Nantes (C)	38	25	8	5	80	40	+40	58	Qualification to European Cup first round
2	Lens	38	19	11	8	73	53	+20	49	Qualification to UEFA Cup first round
3	Bastia	38	20	7	11	82	53	+29	47	Qualification to UEFA Cup first round
4	Nancy	38	18	9	11	78	53	+25	45	
5	Saint-Étienne	38	17	11	10	55	36	+19	45	Qualification to Cup Winners' Cup first round (Note: Saint-Etienne qualified for 1977–78 European Cup Winners' Cup as winners of the 1976–77 Coupe de France.)
6	Lyon	38	17	10	11	54	47	+7	44	
7	Nice	38	19	6	13	60	54	+6	44	
8	Metz	38	17	9	12	67	54	+13	43	
9	Paris Saint-Germain	38	17	8	13	65	55	+10	42	
10	Bordeaux	38	15	8	15	66	57	+9	38	
11	Reims	38	12	12	14	53	60	−7	36	
12	Marseille	38	14	8	16	48	63	−15	36	
13	Nîmes	38	12	10	16	45	56	−11	34	
14	Sochaux	38	12	10	16	44	56	−12	34	
15	Troyes	38	13	7	18	41	59	−18	33	
16	Laval	38	11	10	17	46	62	−16	32	
17	Valenciennes	38	9	13	16	41	56	−15	31	
18	Angers (R)	38	8	11	19	44	65	−21	27	Relegation to French Division 2
19	Lille (R)	38	7	7	24	40	67	−27	21	Relegation to French Division 2
20	Rennes (R)	38	6	9	23	43	79	−36	21	Relegation to French Division 2

Source: Histoire du PSG
Rules for classification: 1) points; 2) goal difference; 3) number of goals scored.
Victory: 2 points, Draw: 1 point, Defeat: 0 points
(C) Champions; (R) Relegated
Notes:

Promoted from Division 2, who will play in Division 1 season 1977/1978

- RC Strasbourg: Champion of Division 2, winner of Division 2 group B
- AS Monaco: Runner-up, winner of Division 2 group A
- FC Rouen: Third place, winner of barrages

== Results ==
Home \ Away	ANG	BAS	BOR	LVL	RCL	LIL	OL	OM	MET	NAL	NAN	NIC	NMS	PSG	REI	REN	STE	SOC	TRO	VAL
Angers		0–3	0–0	1–1	3–2	3–0	0–1	1–2	0–2	3–1	2–2	5–0	0–0	0–2	1–2	1–0	4–2	1–1	1–2	0–0
Bastia	5–1		4–1	3–1	3–2	1–1	3–0	4–0	2–0	3–2	3–0	2–0	5–0	5–2	3–2	3–1	1–1	2–0	3–0	4–0
Bordeaux	4–1	1–0		0–1	5–2	2–1	1–2	5–0	3–3	2–0	1–2	3–1	0–0	5–2	3–1	2–1	2–0	2–1	3–0	0–0
Laval	2–0	3–1	0–0		1–3	1–0	3–0	2–1	1–1	1–1	1–2	1–0	0–1	2–1	0–0	0–0	3–1	0–2	1–1	1–1
Lens	2–0	4–3	3–3	2–1		4–2	2–0	1–0	4–1	1–1	1–1	1–1	3–0	3–3	2–2	3–1	1–1	2–1	3–1	1–0
Lille	0–1	0–3	2–2	3–2	0–1		3–0	2–0	2–0	1–1	1–3	0–2	1–2	2–0	2–1	2–2	1–0	1–1	3–1	1–1
Lyon	1–1	1–1	1–0	2–0	3–3	1–0		2–1	1–0	2–1	2–0	4–1	4–0	1–1	2–1	1–2	0–2	3–0	0–0	2–0
Marseille	2–1	4–1	1–1	2–1	2–2	3–2	3–1		3–1	2–4	1–1	0–1	1–0	2–1	0–1	3–2	1–0	1–1	2–0	1–1
Metz	4–2	1–1	4–2	5–3	0–1	3–1	2–0	3–0		3–0	1–2	2–2	2–0	3–1	2–0	1–0	0–0	2–0	2–1	2–2
Nancy	1–1	4–1	7–3	4–1	1–1	3–0	0–0	2–0	4–1		3–0	1–4	3–1	1–2	4–2	3–2	2–0	3–0	2–0	3–0
Nantes	3–0	3–1	2–0	4–0	1–1	3–1	3–0	3–0	3–2	3–1		6–1	1–0	3–3	1–1	3–1	3–0	2–1	2–1	3–1
Nice	4–1	5–0	2–1	2–1	1–0	2–0	1–2	2–2	2–4	2–0	1–2		1–0	1–0	2–3	4–0	2–0	1–0	2–0	2–1
Nîmes	3–1	3–1	3–2	4–2	0–2	1–0	1–1	2–3	1–1	2–2	0–0	3–2		3–0	1–1	6–2	1–1	0–1	2–0	2–2
Paris SG	2–0	2–2	2–1	5–0	3–1	2–1	2–4	1–1	3–1	2–0	0–1	3–0	0–0		2–1	3–1	2–0	1–0	2–1	1–2
Reims	2–1	1–1	2–1	1–0	2–0	3–1	1–1	1–0	0–2	3–3	0–2	0–1	2–0	2–3		3–0	2–2	1–1	1–3	3–0
Rennes	4–2	1–1	0–2	1–3	2–1	3–1	2–2	2–1	2–3	0–3	2–1	0–0	0–1	1–1	2–2		0–1	2–2	2–2	0–2
Saint-Étienne	1–1	2–1	2–0	3–1	3–0	2–0	1–1	4–0	0–0	3–2	2–0	2–0	2–0	1–0	0–0	4–0		2–0	4–0	5–0
Sochaux	1–1	2–0	1–0	1–1	1–5	4–2	2–1	1–2	1–0	0–3	2–6	1–2	2–1	1–1	2–2	2–1	4–0		2–0	2–1
Troyes	1–1	1–0	0–1	2–1	0–2	1–0	0–3	0–0	3–2	0–1	2–3	2–2	3–1	2–1	4–1	2–1	0–0	1–0		2–1
Valenciennes	0–2	1–2	3–2	1–2	0–1	1–0	3–2	3–1	1–1	1–1	0–0	1–1	2–0	0–3	5–0	2–0	1–1	0–0	1–2	

Legend: Blue = home team win; Yellow = draw; Red = away team win.

== Top goalscorers ==
Rank	Player	Club	Goals
1	(Argentina) Carlos Bianchi	Reims	28
2	(France) Michel Platini	Nancy	25
3	(Luxembourg) Nico Braun	Metz	23
4	(Argentina) Hugo Curioni	Metz	22
4	(Algeria) Mustapha Dahleb	Paris Saint-Germain	22
6	(Socialist Federal Republic of Yugoslavia) Dragan Džajić	Bastia	21
6	(France) François Félix	Bastia	21
6	(France) Bernard Lacombe	Lyon	21
9	(France) Jacques Vergnes	Laval	19
9	(Socialist Federal Republic of Yugoslavia) Nenad Bjeković	Nice	19

== Attendances ==
No.	Club	Average attendance	Change
1	Paris Saint-Germain FC	22,410	29.8%
2	RC Lens	19,097	23.2%
3	FC Nantes	17,969	38.0%
4	AS Saint-Étienne	17,618	-9.5%
5	Olympique lyonnais	15,598	59.2%
6	AS Nancy	13,435	43.7%
7	Olympique de Marseille	13,292	-23.8%
8	FC Metz	13,065	-8.8%
9	Stade lavallois	10,753	63.5%
10	OGC Nice	10,318	-25.8%
11	Girondins de Bordeaux	9,865	2.6%
12	Stade de Reims	9,066	-13.3%
13	Stade rennais	8,843	13.4%
14	LOSC	8,313	-20.1%
15	Troyes AF	8,241	-5.3%
16	US Valenciennes	7,201	-21.7%
17	Angers SCO	6,584	25.8%
18	Nîmes Olympique	6,323	-7.0%
19	SC Bastia	5,118	4.6%
20	FC Sochaux	4,981	-37.9%
