= 1978–79 French Division 1 =

41st season of French Division 1

Division 1
- Season: 1978–79
- Dates: 19 July 1978 – 1 June 1979
- Champions: Strasbourg (1st title)
- Relegated: Paris FC; Reims
- European Cup: Strasbourg
- Cup Winners' Cup: Nantes
- UEFA Cup: Monaco; Saint-Étienne
- Matches: 380
- Goals: 1,141 (3 per match)
- Top goalscorer: Carlos Bianchi (27 goals)

RC Strasbourg won Division 1 season 1978/1979 of the French Association Football League with 56 points.

== Participating teams ==
- Angers SCO
- SEC Bastia
- Bordeaux
- Stade Lavallois
- Lille
- Olympique Lyonnais
- Olympique de Marseille
- FC Metz
- AS Monaco
- AS Nancy
- FC Nantes Atlantique
- OGC Nice
- Nîmes Olympique
- Paris FC
- Paris Saint-Germain FC
- Stade de Reims
- AS Saint-Etienne
- FC Sochaux
- RC Strasbourg
- US Valenciennes-Anzin
Location of teams in 1978–79 Division 1

== League table ==
Pos	Team	Pld	W	D	L	GF	GA	GD	Pts	Qualification or relegation
1	Strasbourg (C)	38	22	12	4	68	28	+40	56	Qualification to European Cup first round
2	Nantes	38	23	8	7	85	33	+52	54	Qualification to Cup Winners' Cup first round (Note: Nantes qualified for the 1979–80 European Cup Winners' Cup as winners of the 1978–79 Coupe de France.)
3	Saint-Étienne	38	24	6	8	77	34	+43	54	Qualification to UEFA Cup first round
4	Monaco	38	18	8	12	70	51	+19	44	Qualification to UEFA Cup first round
5	Metz	38	19	6	13	61	56	+5	44	
6	Lille	38	11	18	9	67	62	+5	40	
7	Lyon	38	15	10	13	53	56	−3	40	
8	Nîmes	38	15	9	14	61	50	+11	39	
9	Sochaux	38	15	9	14	63	53	+10	39	
10	Bordeaux	38	12	15	11	45	42	+3	39	
11	Nancy	38	15	8	15	77	61	+16	38	
12	Marseille	38	12	13	13	50	55	−5	37	
13	Paris Saint-Germain	38	14	8	16	59	66	−7	36	
14	Bastia	38	13	9	16	53	65	−12	35	
15	Nice	38	11	10	17	58	75	−17	32	
16	Laval	38	8	14	16	53	73	−20	30	
17	Angers	38	8	14	16	37	68	−31	30	
18	Valenciennes	38	9	10	19	36	65	−29	28	
19	Paris FC (R)	38	9	10	19	42	77	−35	28	Qualification to relegation play-offs
20	Reims (R)	38	3	11	24	26	71	−45	17	Relegation to French Division 2

Source: Histoire du PSG
Rules for classification: 1) points; 2) goal difference; 3) number of goals scored.
Victory: 2 points, Draw: 1 point, Defeat: 0 points
(C) Champions; (R) Relegated
Notes:

Promoted from Division 2, who will play in Division 1 season 1979/1980

- Stade Brest:Runner-up, winner of Division 2 group B
- RC Lens:Third place, winner of barrages against Paris FC
- FC Gueugnon:Champion of Division 2, winner of Division 2 group A, will not play in Division 1 season 1979/1980 because of its amateur status.

== Results ==
Home \ Away	ANG	BAS	BOR	LVL	LIL	OL	OM	MET	ASM	NAL	NAN	NIC	NMS	PFC	PSG	REI	STE	SOC	RCS	VAL
Angers		0–2	0–0	1–1	1–1	1–1	1–1	3–1	2–2	2–1	1–1	1–1	2–1	0–0	2–2	3–0	1–3	3–2	1–2	1–0
Bastia	1–0		1–1	2–2	0–0	1–0	1–3	1–3	4–1	5–1	1–0	5–2	1–0	5–1	1–2	3–2	0–2	3–0	1–1	2–0
Bordeaux	2–0	2–0		1–1	1–1	4–1	2–1	1–2	0–2	0–0	1–1	2–0	0–0	1–2	2–0	0–0	2–1	1–1	1–1	1–0
Laval	1–2	0–1	3–1		3–3	3–1	2–1	0–1	0–3	1–4	0–5	1–2	2–2	5–1	2–3	1–0	2–1	1–1	2–2	1–1
Lille	0–0	2–2	1–1	5–3		1–1	2–0	1–1	4–2	4–3	1–3	4–0	1–1	4–2	3–1	4–0	3–0	4–2	1–2	2–1
Lyon	3–0	1–1	0–1	1–0	4–0		1–1	3–1	0–0	2–1	0–3	4–0	3–1	2–1	4–2	1–1	2–0	1–0	0–3	3–0
Marseille	0–3	1–0	0–0	0–0	1–1	2–2		2–3	1–2	3–2	1–1	0–0	2–0	1–1	4–1	0–0	2–0	2–2	1–0	1–0
Metz	1–0	3–1	1–0	5–1	4–4	1–2	2–1		1–1	3–1	1–3	2–0	2–0	5–1	2–1	4–1	0–1	0–0	1–2	1–0
Monaco	3–0	6–0	2–2	2–2	2–1	0–1	1–2	4–1		1–3	2–1	6–1	1–0	2–1	2–1	3–0	0–1	1–1	0–2	2–2
Nancy	2–2	5–1	4–1	2–3	3–1	1–1	5–0	1–1	1–2		3–2	3–1	3–0	5–1	2–1	4–0	1–1	1–2	0–0	4–0
Nantes	5–0	1–0	1–0	2–1	0–0	5–1	2–2	1–0	3–0	3–0		5–0	4–0	2–0	1–0	2–0	3–1	4–0	3–0	4–0
Nice	3–1	2–2	2–1	2–1	1–1	4–0	4–2	5–0	1–2	2–2	1–1		1–2	5–0	1–3	2–0	1–1	2–1	0–0	3–4
Nîmes	3–0	3–2	4–2	4–0	3–2	2–2	1–2	2–0	1–0	3–0	4–2	4–1		2–0	1–2	4–0	2–2	2–1	0–0	5–0
Paris FC	3–0	1–1	3–1	2–2	1–1	0–0	2–1	1–2	1–7	1–1	1–2	3–0	1–0		1–1	2–1	0–1	3–1	0–1	0–2
Paris SG	1–1	4–0	2–5	1–2	0–0	2–1	4–3	0–2	3–0	2–1	1–1	1–1	3–2	2–2		3–2	1–1	3–1	2–1	2–0
Reims	3–1	1–1	0–0	1–1	0–0	1–2	0–1	1–2	0–2	1–3	1–4	2–2	0–0	0–2	2–0		0–1	0–2	1–1	2–1
Saint-Étienne	4–0	2–1	1–3	3–0	5–1	3–0	1–0	1–0	4–1	3–2	3–1	5–1	2–0	6–0	4–1	2–0		3–1	2–0	5–0
Sochaux	4–0	5–0	2–0	2–1	1–1	5–1	2–2	4–0	1–2	1–2	3–1	2–1	2–2	1–0	2–1	2–1	0–0		1–2	3–0
Strasbourg	6–0	2–0	1–1	1–1	3–0	1–0	4–1	3–0	2–1	3–0	2–1	1–0	0–0	3–0	3–0	2–2	2–1	2–1		5–0
Valenciennes	1–1	3–0	0–1	1–1	4–2	3–1	0–2	2–2	0–0	1–0	1–1	0–3	2–0	1–1	1–0	3–0	0–0	0–1	2–2	

Legend: Blue = home team win; Yellow = draw; Red = away team win.

== Relegation play-offs ==
Team 1	Agg.	Team 2	1st leg	2nd leg
Lens	0–0 (3–2 p)	Paris FC	0–0	0–0

== Top goalscorers ==
Rank	Player	Club	Goals
1	(Argentina) Carlos Bianchi	Paris Saint-Germain	27
2	(Argentina) Delio Onnis	Monaco	22
2	(France) Éric Pécout	Nantes	22
4	(France) Pierre Pleimelding	Lille	21
4	(France) Gilbert Marguerite	Nîmes	21
4	(France) Dominique Rocheteau	Saint-Étienne	21
7	(Socialist Federal Republic of Yugoslavia) Nenad Bjeković	Nice	17
7	(France) Albert Gemmrich	Strasbourg	17
9	(Argentina) Roberto Cabral	Lille	16
10	(Netherlands) Johnny Rep	Bastia	15
10	(Socialist Federal Republic of Yugoslavia) Žarko Olarević	Lille	15
10	(France) Bernard Zénier	Nancy	15
10	(Socialist Federal Republic of Yugoslavia) Zvonko Ivezić	Sochaux	15

== RC Strasbourg Winning Squad 1978-'79 ==
Goal

- (France) Dominique Dropsy
- (France) Patrick Ottmann

Defence

- (France) Raymond Domenech
- (France) Jacky Duguépéroux (Cap.)
- (France) Jacques Glassmann
- (France) Jean-Jacques Marx
- (France) Jacques Novi
- (France) Léonard Specht
- (France) Patrick Vincent

Midfield

- (France) René Deutschmann
- (France) Yves Ehrlacher
- (France) Roger Jouve
- (France) Eric Mosser
- (France) Francis Piasecki
- (France) Bernard Tischner
- (France) Rémy Vogel
- (France) Arsène Wenger

Attack

- (France) Albert Gemmrich
- (France) Remy Gentes
- (France) Pascal Greiner
- (Chad) Nabatingue Toko
- (France) Joël Tanter
- (France) Jacques Vergnes
- (France) Roland Wagner
- (France) André Wiss

Management

- (Switzerland) Gilbert Gress (Coach)

== Attendances ==
#	Club	Average
1	Strasbourg	21,086
2	Saint-Étienne	20,798
3	PSG	18,590
4	Nantes	16,146
5	LOSC	14,350
6	Marseille	13,152
7	Metz	12,914
8	Lyon	12,386
9	Nancy	11,350
10	Girondins	11,082
11	Paris FC	9,623
12	Nice	8,846
13	Stade lavallois	8,625
14	Angers	7,732
15	Nîmes	7,553
16	Valenciennes	6,933
17	Reims	6,685
18	Sochaux	5,973
19	Bastia	5,148
20	Monaco	3,931
