= René Deutschmann =

Swedish footballer (born 2008)

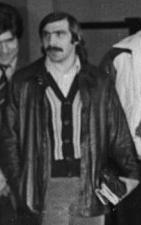
- Deutschmann in 1980

Personal information
- Date of birth: 17 November 1951 (age 74)
- Place of birth: Strasbourg, France
- Height: 1.71 m (5 ft 7 in)
- Position: Midfielder

Team information
- Current team: Strasbourg

Youth career
- 1961–1969: Strasbourg

Senior career*
Years	Team	Apps	(Gls)
1969–1985	Strasbourg	352	(14)
- * Club domestic league appearances and goals as of 14:02, 19 September 2025 (UTC) ‡ National team caps and goals as of 14:02, 19 September 2025 (UTC)

René Deutschmann (born 17 November 1951) is a French former professional footballer who played his entire career as a midfielder for the French club Strasbourg.

== Club career ==
Deutschmann was a youth product of Strasbourg since the age of 10, and was promoted to their senior team in 1969. He spent 16 seasons with the club, 14 in Ligue 1 and 2 in Ligue 2. He helped them win the 1976–77 French Division 2, and two years later won the 1978–79 French Division 1, their only to date. He retired in 1985, having been sidelined by injury to his anterior and posterior cruciate ligaments.

== Personal life ==
After retirement, Deutschmann split his time between France and Thailand. In February 2017 he suffered a stroke in Thailand, and was repatriated by a campaign Strasbourg fans to get better health coverage in France.

== Honours ==
Strasbourg

- Ligue 1: 1978–79
- Ligue 2: 1976–77
