= Jean-Pierre Adams =

French footballer (1948–2021)

Personal information
- Date of birth: 10 March 1948
- Place of birth: Dakar, French West Africa
- Date of death: 6 September 2021 (aged 73)
- Place of death: Nîmes, France
- Height: 1.78 m (5 ft 10 in)
- Position: Centre-back

Youth career
- US Cepoy
- CD Bellegarde
- USM Montargis

Senior career*
| Years | Team | Apps | (Gls) |
| 1967–1970 | Entente BFN | | |
| 1970–1973 | Nîmes | 84 | (8) |
| 1973–1977 | Nice | 126 | (15) |
| 1977–1979 | Paris Saint-Germain | 41 | (1) |
| 1979–1980 | Mulhouse | 11 | (1) |
| 1980–1981 | Chalon | 23 | (1) |
| Total | | 285+ | (26+) |

International career
| 1972–1976 | France | 22 | (0) |
- * Club domestic league appearances and goals

Jean-Pierre Adams (10 March 1948 – 6 September 2021) was a French professional footballer who played as a centre-back.

He was capped 22 times for France in the 1970s, and at club level, he played Division 1 football for Nîmes, Nice and Paris Saint-Germain. From March 1982 until his death in September 2021, he was in a coma as a result of mistakes made during a hospital operation.

== Early life ==
Adams was born and raised in Dakar until the age of 10, when he left his native Senegal on a pilgrimage to Montargis in the Loiret department accompanied by his grandmother, a devout Catholic. When they arrived, she enrolled him at a local Catholic school, Saint-Louis de Montargis. He was adopted by a French couple shortly after his arrival in the country.

During his studies, Adams worked at a local rubber manufacturer and he started playing football at several local clubs in the Loiret area.

== Club career ==
Adams started playing with Entente BFN in 1967 as a striker, with whom he was runner-up in the Championnat de France Amateur twice. In 1970, he signed a contract with Nîmes, going on to remain in Division 1 for the following nine seasons, also representing Nice and Paris Saint-Germain.

In the 1971–72 campaign, Adams contributed four goals in all 38 games to help Nîmes to a best-ever second place, also winning the Cup of the Alps. He added a career-best nine for Nice in 1973–74, for a final fifth position.

After one year in Division 2 with Mulhouse, Adams retired in 1981 at the age of 33, following a spell with amateurs Chalon as player-coach.

== International career ==
On 15 June 1972, Adams made his debut for the France national team in an unofficial exhibition game against an African XI selected by the Confederation of African Football. His first competitive cap came on 13 October of that year, in a 1–0 home win over the Soviet Union for the 1974 FIFA World Cup qualifiers.

Adams' last of his 22 appearances occurred on 1 September 1976, in a friendly with Denmark. During his tenure with Les Bleus, he formed a stopper partnership with Marius Trésor which was dubbed La garde noire (black guard).

== Personal life, injury and death ==
Adams and his wife Bernadette were married in April 1969 and had two sons, Laurent (born 1969) and Frédéric (1976). Following a ligament rupture injury, he was hospitalised for surgery on 17 March 1982 at the Édouard Herriot Hospital in Lyon. Because many hospital staff were on strike during that time, errors were made by his anesthetist and a trainee, who later admitted to being "not up to the task"; as a result, Adams suffered a bronchospasm which starved his brain of oxygen and he slipped into a coma.

In the mid-1990s, when a court of law adjudicated on the case, both the anaesthetist and trainee were given one-month suspended sentences and were fined $815. His wife continued to tend to his needs, refusing to consider euthanasia.

Adams died on 6 September 2021 in Nîmes at the age of 73, after being in a coma for 39 years. The following day, he was honoured with a minute's applause prior to the World Cup qualifier between France and Finland in Lyon.

== Honours ==
Entente BFN

- Championnat de France Amateur runner-up: 1967–68, 1968–69
