= 1977–78 French Division 1 =

40th season of French Division 1

Division 1
- Season: 1977–78
- Dates: 3 August 1977 – 2 May 1978
- Champions: Monaco (3rd title)
- Relegated: Lens; Troyes; Rouen
- European Cup: Monaco
- Cup Winners' Cup: Nancy
- UEFA Cup: Nantes; Strasbourg
- Matches: 380
- Goals: 1,135 (2.99 per match)
- Top goalscorer: Carlos Bianchi (37 goals)

AS Monaco won the 1977–78 Division 1 season of the French Association Football League with 53 points.

== Participating teams ==
- SEC Bastia
- Bordeaux
- Stade Lavallois
- RC Lens
- Olympique Lyonnais
- Olympique de Marseille
- FC Metz
- AS Monaco
- AS Nancy
- FC Nantes Atlantique
- OGC Nice
- Nîmes Olympique
- Paris Saint-Germain FC
- Stade de Reims
- FC Rouen
- AS Saint-Etienne
- FC Sochaux
- RC Strasbourg
- Troyes AF
- US Valenciennes-Anzin
Location of teams in 1977–78 Division 1

== League table ==
Pos	Team	Pld	W	D	L	GF	GA	GD	Pts	Qualification or relegation
1	Monaco (C)	38	22	9	7	79	46	+33	53	Qualification to European Cup first round
2	Nantes	38	21	10	7	60	26	+34	52	Qualification to UEFA Cup first round
3	Strasbourg	38	19	12	7	70	40	+30	50	Qualification to UEFA Cup first round
4	Marseille	38	20	7	11	70	41	+29	47	
5	Bastia	38	19	6	13	62	44	+18	44	
6	Nancy	38	17	9	12	63	49	+14	43	Qualification to Cup Winners' Cup first round (Note: Nancy qualified for 1978–79 European Cup Winners' Cup as winners of the 1977–78 Coupe de France.)
7	Saint-Étienne	38	18	6	14	50	49	+1	42	
8	Nice	38	17	7	14	72	70	+2	41	
9	Sochaux	38	15	10	13	65	54	+11	40	
10	Laval	38	15	7	16	50	58	−8	37	
11	Paris Saint-Germain	38	14	8	16	75	66	+9	36	
12	Metz	38	13	9	16	41	57	−16	35	
13	Nîmes	38	11	11	16	49	63	−14	33	
14	Valenciennes	38	11	10	17	48	58	−10	32	
15	Reims	38	11	10	17	42	55	−13	32	
16	Bordeaux	38	12	8	18	46	69	−23	32	
17	Lyon	38	12	7	19	56	59	−3	31	
18	Lens (R)	38	12	7	19	56	71	−15	31	Relegation to French Division 2
19	Troyes (R)	38	11	9	18	41	69	−28	31	Relegation to French Division 2
20	Rouen (R)	38	6	6	26	40	91	−51	18	Relegation to French Division 2

Source: Histoire du PSG
Rules for classification: 1) points; 2) goal difference; 3) number of goals scored.
Victory: 2 points, Draw: 1 point, Defeat: 0 points
(C) Champions; (R) Relegated
Notes:

Promoted from Division 2, who will play in Division 1 season 1978/1979

- Lille: Champion of Division 2, winner of Division 2 group B
- Angers SCO: Runner-up, winner of Division 2 group A
- Paris FC: Third place, winner of barrages against RC Lens

== Results ==
Home \ Away	BAS	BOR	LVL	RCL	OL	OM	MET	ASM	NAL	NAN	NIC	NMS	PSG	REI	ROU	STE	SOC	RCS	TRO	VAL
Bastia		1–2	1–0	3–1	2–1	2–0	2–0	0–2	1–0	0–0	4–1	2–1	5–3	3–0	3–2	2–0	0–0	3–1	6–0	3–0
Bordeaux	1–0		1–1	0–1	1–4	1–2	1–0	0–4	2–0	1–0	3–5	4–4	1–2	2–0	4–0	2–2	1–1	3–0	1–1	2–0
Laval	0–1	2–1		3–0	1–0	2–1	3–0	0–0	1–2	1–1	2–0	2–1	1–2	2–0	3–0	1–0	3–1	2–3	2–1	3–1
Lens	3–4	2–0	1–1		2–3	3–2	1–2	2–3	1–0	0–1	3–1	4–1	3–1	3–1	5–1	2–0	1–3	2–2	3–2	0–2
Lyon	2–1	1–1	5–0	2–0		4–2	4–1	1–1	1–3	1–0	1–1	3–1	2–3	0–1	4–0	2–2	0–2	1–1	0–0	1–2
Marseille	2–0	4–0	0–1	4–0	4–0		4–0	2–2	1–1	2–2	2–0	1–1	2–1	2–1	4–1	3–0	4–0	1–0	0–1	3–0
Metz	0–0	5–0	1–0	2–1	1–0	0–2		2–1	3–0	2–2	2–0	3–0	2–1	2–1	4–1	0–2	1–1	0–0	0–0	1–1
Monaco	2–1	3–2	4–0	3–0	3–1	2–3	4–0		2–0	1–1	2–0	2–1	0–0	2–0	6–1	3–1	2–1	3–2	1–1	3–2
Nancy	3–0	4–1	3–0	0–0	3–1	1–1	0–0	2–2		3–0	1–1	2–2	4–1	4–1	1–0	2–1	1–1	3–1	1–0	2–2
Nantes	2–0	4–1	3–1	2–0	2–0	1–0	2–0	1–0	2–0		6–1	3–1	3–1	3–1	0–0	1–0	2–0	1–1	3–0	4–1
Nice	3–1	1–0	4–2	5–4	3–1	1–1	1–1	1–1	3–7	1–0		3–1	2–3	4–2	6–1	2–1	4–2	0–1	4–1	0–2
Nîmes	2–0	3–1	1–0	2–1	3–0	2–1	2–0	3–4	1–0	0–0	1–1		2–1	1–0	3–2	0–0	1–1	0–1	1–1	1–2
Paris SG	3–3	1–2	2–2	2–1	2–3	5–1	2–0	1–2	1–2	0–1	0–3	5–0		2–2	3–1	4–1	3–1	2–2	8–2	2–0
Reims	1–3	1–0	3–1	0–0	2–1	0–0	0–0	0–2	4–1	1–3	0–0	2–1	0–0		3–1	0–0	1–1	0–0	5–1	3–0
Rouen	0–0	1–2	1–1	0–0	3–2	0–2	5–2	3–4	3–2	0–0	2–0	2–0	1–3	1–2		1–2	1–2	0–3	2–1	1–1
Saint-Étienne	0–4	5–0	1–0	0–1	1–0	2–1	2–0	1–0	2–1	2–1	1–2	2–1	1–1	2–0	2–1		3–1	4–3	1–0	2–1
Sochaux	2–0	0–0	4–1	7–2	1–0	1–2	4–0	3–2	2–0	1–1	1–2	1–1	2–1	2–3	3–0	2–3		3–2	5–2	0–1
Strasbourg	1–1	3–0	6–2	3–0	2–2	2–1	5–1	3–0	2–0	1–0	2–1	3–0	1–1	2–1	2–0	2–0	1–1		3–0	1–1
Troyes	1–0	1–1	0–0	0–0	0–2	0–1	0–2	3–0	2–3	1–0	3–1	2–2	3–1	3–0	3–1	1–0	1–0	0–2		2–1
Valenciennes	2–0	0–1	2–3	3–3	1–0	1–2	2–1	1–1	0–1	0–2	2–4	1–1	2–1	0–0	3–0	1–1	1–2	0–0	6–1	

Legend: Blue = home team win; Yellow = draw; Red = away team win.

== Top goalscorers ==
Rank	Player	Club	Goals
1	(Argentina) Carlos Bianchi	Paris Saint-Germain	37
2	(Argentina) Delio Onnis	Monaco	29
2	(Socialist Federal Republic of Yugoslavia) Nenad Bjeković	Nice	29
4	(France) Bernard Lacombe	Lyon	24
5	(Senegal) Saar Boubacar	Marseille	21
5	(France) Albert Gemmrich	Strasbourg	21
7	(France) Marc Berdoll	Marseille	20
8	(Netherlands) Johnny Rep	Bastia	18
8	(France) Christian Dalger	Monaco	18
8	(France) Michel Platini	Nancy	18

== Attendances ==
#	Club	Average
1	PSG	21,754
2	Marseille	20,940
3	Strasbourg	20,419
4	Saint-Étienne	18,147
5	Nantes	15,304
6	Lens	13,365
7	Nancy	12,762
8	Metz	10,545
9	Rouen	10,422
10	Nice	10,371
11	Olympique lyonnais	10,361
12	Stade lavallois	9,644
13	Reims	9,071
14	Girondins	8,688
15	Nîmes	6,661
16	Troyes	6,075
17	Valenciennes	6,059
18	Sochaux	5,337
19	Monaco	4,171
20	Bastia	4,015
