= 1977–78 Coupe de France =

Tournament details
- Country: France

The Coupe de France 1977–78 was its 61st edition. It was won by Nancy which defeated OGC Nice in the Final.

== Round of 16 ==
Team 1	Agg.	Team 2	1st leg	2nd leg
Stade de Reims (D1)	1–3	SC Bastia (D1)	0–1	1–2
FC Metz (D1)	0–5	OGC Nice (D1)	0–2	0–3
Olympique de Marseille (D1)	3–0	Girondins de Bordeaux (D1)	1–0	2–0
Nancy (D1)	3–1	FC Martigues (D2)	2–0	1–1
Lille OSC (D2)	3–4	AS Monaco (D1)	1–1	2–3
AS Angoulême (D2)	0–1	FC Sochaux-Montbéliard (D1)	0–0	0–1
FC Nantes (D1)	7–0	USL Dunkerque (D2)	2–0	5–0
Gazélec Ajaccio (D2)	4–6	US Valenciennes (D1)	4–1	0–5

== Quarter-finals ==
Team 1	Agg.	Team 2	1st leg	2nd leg
OGC Nice (D1)	4–2	FC Nantes (D1)	4–1	0–1
FC Sochaux-Montbéliard (D1)	1–0	Olympique de Marseille (D1)	0–0	1–0
US Valenciennes (D1)	0–3	Nancy (D1)	0–0	0–3
SC Bastia (D1)	2–3	AS Monaco (D1)	2–1	0–2

== Semi-finals ==
=== First leg ===
5 May 1978

Sochaux (1)	1–0	Nancy (1)
Pintenat 45'

Stade Auguste Bonal, Montbéliard
Attendance: 15,000
Referee: Marc Buils

5 May 1978

Nice (1)	1–0	Monaco (1)
Guillou 39'

Stade du Ray, Nice
Attendance: 19,558
Referee: Michel Vautrot

=== Second leg ===
8 May 1978

Nancy (1)	5–0	Sochaux (1)
Chebel 11'; Rouyer 19', 54'; Platini 36'; Caron 58'

Stade Marcel Picot, Tomblaine
Attendance: 23,000
Referee: Michel Kitabdjian

Nancy won 5–1 on aggregate.

8 May 1978

Monaco (1)	1–1	Nice (1)
Nogues 23'		Bjeković 71'

Stade Louis II, Monaco
Attendance: 9,812
Referee: Alain Delmer

Nice won 2–1 on aggregate.

== Final ==
13 May 1978

Nancy	1–0	Nice
Platini 57'

Parc des Princes, Paris
Attendance: 45,998
Referee: Achille Verbecke
