= Hervé Porquet =

French footballer (born 1957)

Personal information
- Date of birth: 22 March 1957 (age 69)
- Place of birth: Nemours, France
- Height: 1.80 m (5 ft 11 in)
- Position: Forward

Youth career
- ASA Montereau
- FC Brunoy
- Meaux

Senior career*
| Years | Team | Apps | (Gls) |
| –1977 | Meaux | | |
| 1977–1979 | Paris Saint-Germain | 10 | (2) |
| 1977–1979 | Paris Saint-Germain B | | |
| 1979–1982 | Fontainebleau | | |
| 1982–1992 | Le Mée SF | | |
- * Club domestic league appearances and goals

Hervé Porquet (born 22 March 1957) is a French former professional footballer who played as a forward. He notably played in the Division 1 for Paris Saint-Germain from 1977 to 1979.

== Club career ==
Porquet played for ASA Montereau and FC Brunoy in his youth before joining Meaux. At Meaux, he made several performances in the Coupe de France that helped him sign for Paris Saint-Germain (PSG) in 1977. He signed for the club as a professional trainee. In two seasons at PSG, he scored over 50 goals for the reserve side, and made ten appearances in the Division 1, scoring two goals. In January 2007, Porquet recalled his goal for PSG against Bordeaux on 17 December 1977 as his "best memory" at Paris Saint-Germain. He came on as a substitute and scored the winner for Les Parisiens at the 85th minute, being the quickest player to latch onto Carlos Bianchi's shot that was stopped by the Bordeaux goalkeeper Philippe Bergeroo.

For his performances at Paris Saint-Germain, Porquet attracted interest from Valenciennes and Troyes. However, he instead signed for Division 3 side Fontainebleau in 1979. In 2014, Porquet explained that he "does not regret at all [his] choice". He explained that he had recently been married, and that he was looking to prepare his post-football career. In Fontainebleau, he was offered a job as a foreman in an industrial company. In 1982, Porquet moved to Le Mée-sur-Seine, where he met Christian Quillay, who offered him to join his amateur club, Le Mée SF. Porquet accepted, thereby ending his professional career. He would go on to play for the club's first team until 1992.

== International career ==
Porquet was a youth international for France. He has also played for Paris Île-de-France, representing the Ligue de Paris-Île-de-France, at cadet, youth, and senior level.

== Personal life ==
Porquet married in the 1970s. After retiring from football in 1992, he continued playing for the "veterans" team of Le Mée SF until 2001. After having been introduced by Christian Quillay, Porquet worked as a sales executive for Continental, an automotive parts company. Porquet would keep the job for over 30 years. He is also an artist; he has created a website where he shows off his artistic works, usually paintings and drawings.
