= Nebojša Zlatarić =

Serbian footballer

Personal information
- Date of birth: 11 December 1953
- Place of birth: Šabac, SFR Yugoslavia
- Date of death: 22 November 2014 (aged 60)
- Place of death: Šabac, Serbia
- Height: 1.72 m (5 ft 8 in)
- Position: Striker

Senior career*
Years	Team	Apps	(Gls)
1974–1975	Mačva Šabac		
1975–1977	Marseille	36	(9)
1977–1978	Paris FC	45	(17)
1978–1979	Lens	18	(9)
1979–1980	Rennes	27	(6)
1980–1981	Valenciennes	15	(2)
- * Club domestic league appearances and goals

Nebojša Zlatarić (Serbian Cyrillic: Небојша Златарић; 11 December 1953 – 22 November 2014) was a Serbian football striker who spent most of his playing career in France. After retiring as a player he had various roles with hometown club Mačva Šabac.
