= Georges Van Straelen =

French footballer and coach (1956-2012)

Personal information
- Date of birth: 10 December 1956
- Place of birth: Lorient, France
- Date of death: 27 October 2012 (aged 55)
- Position: Midfielder

Youth career
- 1968–1972: FC Lorient
- 1972–1975: FC Nantes

Senior career*
Years	Team	Apps	(Gls)
1975–1978	FC Nantes	71	(8)
1978–1981	Girondins de Bordeaux	85	(11)
1981–1982	Stade Brest	41	(1)
1982–1984	Toulouse FC	55	(6)
1984–1986	RC Strasbourg	47	(2)
1986–1987	FC Lorient	59	(2)
Total		323	(26)

Managerial career
- 1988–1991: Vendée Fontenay Foot
- 1991–1992: Luçon VF
- 2011: Al Ahli
- * Club domestic league appearances and goals

Georges Van Straelen (10 December 1956 – 27 October 2012) was a French footballer and coach.
