= Daniel Bernard (footballer) =

French footballer (1949–2020)

Personal information
- Date of birth: 29 September 1949
- Place of birth: Paris, France
- Date of death: 9 April 2020 (aged 70)
- Height: 1.77 m (5 ft 10 in)
- Position: Goalkeeper

Senior career*
Years	Team	Apps	(Gls)
1968–1969	Paris-Neuilly		
1969–1977	Rennes	152	(0)
1977–1978	Paris Saint-Germain	29	(0)
1978–1984	Brest	188	(0)
1984–1985	Monaco	13	(0)

International career
- France youth
- * Club domestic league appearances and goals

Daniel Bernard (29 September 1949 – 9 April 2020) was a French professional footballer who played as a goalkeeper.

== Career ==
Born in Paris, Bernard played club football for Rennes, Paris Saint-Germain, Brest and Monaco.

He represented France at youth level, but never played for the senior team, being an unused substitute on one occasion.

== Later life and death ==
Bernard died on 9 April 2020 aged 70, a few weeks after the death of his daughter.
