= Roland Wagner (footballer) =

French footballer (born 1955)

Personal information
- Full name: Roland Wagner
- Date of birth: December 22, 1955 (age 70)
- Place of birth: Strasbourg, France
- Position: Winger

Youth career
- 1965–1972: Drusenheim

Senior career*
Years	Team	Apps	(Gls)
1972–1982	RC Strasbourg	168	(46)
1982–1983	FC Mulhouse	7	(1)
1985–1987	FC Montceau	44	(4)

International career
1979	France	1	(1)
- * Club domestic league appearances and goals

Roland Wagner (born 22 December 1955) is a French former professional football player.
