= Patrick Ottmann =

French footballer (born 1956)

Personal information
- Full name: Patrick Ottman
- Date of birth: April 21, 1956 (age 70)
- Place of birth: Bischwiller, Bas-Rhin, France
- Height: 1.78 m (5 ft 10 in)
- Position: Goalkeeper

Youth career
- Haguenau

Senior career*
Years	Team	Apps	(Gls)
1977–1987	RC Strasbourg	34	(0)
- * Club domestic league appearances and goals

Patrick Ottmann (born April 21, 1956) is a French former footballer who played as a goalkeeper.
