= Jean-Pierre Posca =

French footballer (1952-2010)

Personal information
- Date of birth: 10 March 1952
- Place of birth: Colombier-Fontaine, France
- Date of death: 1 January 2010 (aged 57)
- Place of death: France
- Height: 1.75 m (5 ft 9 in)
- Position: Defender

Senior career*
Years	Team	Apps	(Gls)
1971–1985	Sochaux	420	(9)
1985–1986	Avignon		
- * Club domestic league appearances and goals

Jean-Pierre Posca (10 March 1952 – 1 January 2010) was a French professional footballer.

== Career ==
Posca began playing football for FC Sochaux-Montbéliard, and would spend his entire professional career with the club. He played several seasons in Ligue 1 with Sochaux and helped the club reach the semi-finals of the 1980–81 UEFA Cup, where it lost to eventual runners-up AZ Alkmaar.
