= Stade Jean-Bouin (Nîmes) =

Former football stadium

- Interactive map of Stade Jean-Bouin
- Location: Nîmes, France
- Coordinates: 43°50′48″N 4°22′35″E
- Owner: SC Nîmois (1919–1937); SCI d'Avignon (1937-1977); Ville de Nîmes
- Operator: Nîmes Olympique
- Capacity: 11,000-15,000

Construction
- Opened: 1919
- Closed: 1989
- Demolished: 1996-1997

Tenants
- SC Nîmois (1919–1937); Nîmes Olympique (1937–1989)

The Stade Jean-Bouin (French: [stad ʒɑ̃ bwɛ̃]) was a football stadium in Nîmes, France, which was the home of Nîmes Olympique between 1937 and 1989.
