= Robert Buigues =

French footballer (born 1950)

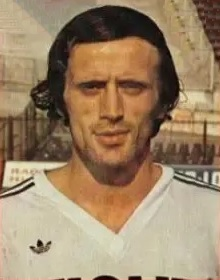
- Buigues in 1975

Personal information
- Date of birth: 9 May 1950 (age 76)
- Place of birth: Guyotville, French Algeria
- Height: 1.73 m (5 ft 8 in)
- Position: Midfielder

Senior career*
Years	Team	Apps	(Gls)
1971–1972	Bastia	27	(1)
1972–1973	Ajaccio	21	(3)
1973–1976	Marseille	103	(17)
1976–1978	Bordeaux	70	(15)
1978–1981	Marseille	93	(15)
1981–1982	Orléans	33	(4)
1983–1984	Laval	51	(4)
1984–1986	Grenoble	55	(2)

Managerial career
- 1985: Grenoble
- 1986–1987: Poissy
- 1987–1989: Saint-Dizier
- 1989–1991: Épernay
- 1991–1995: Chamois Niortais
- 1995: Créteil
- 1998: Medenine
- 1999: US Lusitanos Saint-Maur
- 1999–2002: Paris FC
- 2002–2003: Cannes
- 2003–2004: Vitrolles
- 2004–2005: Racing Paris
- 2005–2006: Sète
- 2007: USM Annaba
- 2010–2011: Hyères
- 2011–2012: Pau FC
- * Club domestic league appearances and goals

Robert Buigues (born 9 May 1950) is a French former professional football player and manager.

Whilst playing for Marseille, Buigues started in the 1976 French Cup final and collected a winner's medal when Marseille defeated Lyon 2–0.

Buigues' long career both as a player and a manager was mostly spent in France, although he did have a short spell as manager of Tunisian Ligue Professionnelle 3 side Medenine in 1998. He retired from management in 2006 after leaving FC Sète.
