= Jean-Pierre Tokoto =

Cameroonian footballer

Personal information
- Date of birth: 26 January 1948 (age 78)
- Place of birth: Douala, Cameroon
- Height: 1.78 m (5 ft 10 in)
- Position: Midfielder

Senior career*
Years	Team	Apps	(Gls)
1963–1969	Oryx Douala	–	(–)
1968–1969	Marseille	12	(1)
1969–1970	CA Paris-Neuilly	31	(13)
1970–1971	AC Paris-Joinville	14	(0)
1971–1972	Marseille	2	(0)
1972–1975	Bordeaux	102	(21)
1975–1977	Paris Saint-Germain	59	(17)
1977–1978	Bordeaux	38	(10)
1978–1980	Béziers Hérault	60	(12)
1980–1981	New England Tea Men	57	(17)
1981	Jacksonville Tea Men	23	(2)
1981–1982	Philadelphia Fever (indoor)	11	(8)

International career
- Cameroon
Medal record
Men's football
Representing Cameroon
Africa Cup of Nations
Third place	1972 Cameroon
- * Club domestic league appearances and goals

Jean-Pierre Tokoto (born 26 January 1948) is a retired Cameroonian professional footballer. He made three appearances for the Cameroon national team at the 1982 FIFA World Cup.

== Career ==
=== Club ===
In March 1980, Tokoto signed with the New England Tea Men of the North American Soccer League. In 1981, the team moved to Florida and renamed itself the Jacksonville Tea Men. In the fall of 1981, Tokoto moved to the Philadelphia Fever of the Major Indoor Soccer League.

In 2006, he was selected by CAF as one of the best 200 African football players of the last 50 years.

=== International ===
Tokoto made three appearances for Cameroon at the 1982 FIFA World Cup. He played in all five of Cameroon's matches at the 1972 African Cup of Nations and was named to the tournament's team.

=== Coaching ===
After retiring from professional football in the early 1980s, Tokoto conducted camps in the New Jersey area before moving to Rockford, Illinois, in 1991. He joined Rockford United Soccer Club as an assistant coach in 1992 and became its head coach in 1994. In 1995, he founded the Tokoto City Soccer League, which had grown to 350 inner-city members by 1999.

== Personal life ==
Tokoto's grandson, also named Jean-Pierre, is a basketball player who was drafted in 2015 by the Philadelphia 76ers of the National Basketball Association (NBA). Tokoto has a second grandson, Seth Trimble, who plays college basketball for the North Carolina Tar Heels.

== Honours ==
Oryx

- Cameroonian Championship: 1963, 1964, 1965, 1967
- Cameroon Cup: 1963, 1968
- African Cup of Champions Clubs: 1965

Marseille

- French Championship: 1972

Cameroon

- African Cup of Nations: 3rd place, 1972

== See also ==
- 1982 FIFA World Cup squads
