= René Vigliani =

French football referee (1929–2022)

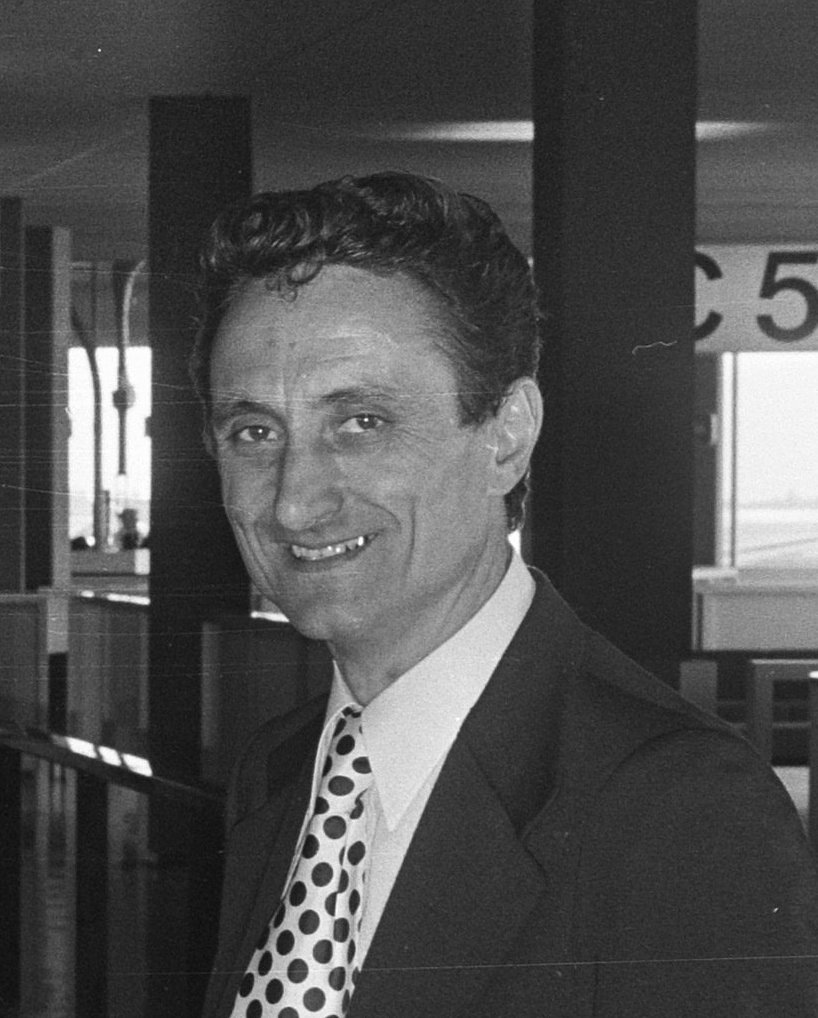
- Vigliani in 1972
- Born: 24 July 1929; Arles, France
- Died: 30 October 2022 (aged 93); Arles, France

Domestic
Years	League	Role
1965–1980	French Division 1	Referee

International
Years	League	Role
1967–1978	FIFA listed	Referee

René Vigliani (24 July 1929 – 30 October 2022) was a French football referee.

== Career ==
Vigliani was member of FIFA from 1967 to 1978, and refereed 7 international matches. He officiated 2 matches in Euro 1976 qualifying and 5 friendly matches. He also refereed a match in the 1978 U21 Euro.

In club football, Vigliani officiated some UEFA competition matches for a total of 1 Champions League game, 12 UEFA Cup games, and 3 Cup Winners' Cup games. He refereed 259 French Division 1 matches from 1965 to 1980, and also officiated the 1971 Coupe de France Final.

== Controversies ==
There were two notable controversial decisions made by Vigliani during his career; one was in the first leg of the 1975–76 UEFA Cup quarter-final match-up between AC Milan and Club Brugge, which Milan won 2–1. The other one was during a French Division 1 match.

== Death ==
Vigliani died in Arles on 30 October 2022, at the age of 93.
