= Dominique Lokoli =

French footballer (born 1952)

Personal information
- Full name: Dominique Lokoli
- Date of birth: 29 January 1952 (age 74)
- Place of birth: Rouen, France
- Height: 1.75 m (5 ft 9 in)
- Position: Defender

Senior career*
Years	Team	Apps	(Gls)
1970–1974	Choisy-le-Roi		
1974–1979	Paris Saint-Germain	133	(2)
1979–1981	Nancy	52	(0)
1981–1984	Auxerre	98	(0)
1984–1986	Reims	66	(8)
1986–1987	Montélimar		
Total		359+	(10+)
- * Club domestic league appearances and goals

Dominique Lokoli (born 29 January 1952) is a French former professional footballer, who played as a defender.

== Career ==
Born in Rouen, Lokoli began his football career at AS Choisy-le-Roi, a club located in the southeastern suburbs of Paris. In 1974, the right-sided defender joined a professional football club at age 22, and would appear in 148 competitive matches during five seasons with Paris Saint-Germain. His teammates gave him the nickname "Bip-Bip", a reference to the Warner Bros. Road Runner, for his pace. He left PSG for Division 1 rivals Nancy, and would finish his career with Auxerre, Reims and Montélimar.

== Personal life ==
Lokoli is of Congolese descent. He is the father of French tennis player, Laurent Lokoli.
