= Bernard Moraly =

French football player and manager (born 1957)

Personal information
- Full name: Bernard Moraly
- Date of birth: 19 June 1957 (age 69)
- Place of birth: Algiers, French Algeria
- Height: 1.72 m (5 ft 8 in)
- Position: Defensive midfielder

Youth career
- –1969: CSM Puteaux
- 1969–1970: Stade Saint-Germain
- 1970–1975: Paris Saint-Germain

Senior career*
Years	Team	Apps	(Gls)
1975–1978	Paris Saint-Germain	21	(0)
1978–1980	Paris FC	7	(0)
1980–1986	Grenoble	164	(20)
1986–1987	Jojo		
1987–1989	Saint-Dizier		
1989–1991	Sedan		
1991–1993	Norcap Grenoble		
Total		220+	(22+)

Managerial career
- 1993–1996: Norcap Grenoble B
- * Club domestic league appearances and goals

Bernard Moraly (born 19 June 1957) is a French former professional football player and manager. As a player, he was a defensive midfielder.

== After football ==
From 1991 to 1999, Moraly worked for Derosier Sport, a company in Grenoble. He was in the commercial department. From 1999 to 2003, he was the organizer of Stages Planète sports courses in Lans-en-Vercors. Starting in 2003, he held the same job in the town of Ruoms. He stopped working for Stages Planète in 2015.
