= Marc Berdoll =

French footballer (born 1953)

Personal information
- Date of birth: 6 April 1953 (age 73)
- Place of birth: Trélazé, France
- Height: 1.70 m (5 ft 7 in)
- Position: Striker

Youth career
- Foyer de Trélazé

Senior career*
Years	Team	Apps	(Gls)
1968–1976	Angers		
1976–1977	1. FC Saarbrücken	17	(1)
1977–1980	Marseille	92	(40)
1980–1982	Angers	56	(14)
1982	Amiens	13	(7)
1982–1985	Orléans	78	(24)

International career
1973–1979	France	16	(5)
- * Club domestic league appearances and goals

Marc Berdoll (born 6 April 1953) is a French former professional footballer who played as a striker. During his career he played for Angers, 1. FC Saarbrücken and Marseille, Angers again, Amiens, Orléans and L'Hopital. He earned 16 caps scoring five goals for the France national team, appearing in the 1978 FIFA World Cup, where he scored in the first round match against Hungary.
