= Philippe Redon =

French footballer (1950–2020)

Personal information
- Date of birth: 12 December 1950
- Place of birth: Gorron, France
- Date of death: 12 May 2020 (aged 69)
- Height: 1.69 m (5 ft 7 in)
- Position: Striker

Senior career*
Years	Team	Apps	(Gls)
1971–1975	Rennes	44	(10)
1975–1976	Red Star	32	(8)
1976–1978	Paris Saint-Germain	68	(9)
1978–1979	Bordeaux	35	(2)
1979–1980	Metz	34	(6)
1980–1983	Laval	94	(11)
1983–1984	Rouen	26	(4)
1984–1985	Papeete		
1985–1986	Saint-Étienne	5	(2)
1986–1988	Saint-Lô	22	(4)
1987–1988	Créteil	11	

Managerial career
- 1988–1989: Créteil
- 1989: Lens
- 1989–1990: Créteil
- 1991–1992: Cameroon
- 2000–2002: Liberia
- * Club domestic league appearances and goals

Philippe Redon (12 December 1950 – 12 May 2020) was a French football player and manager.

== Playing career ==
Redon played for Stade Rennais, Red Star, Paris SG, Girondins de Bordeaux, FC Metz, Stade Lavallois, FC Rouen, Papeete, AS Saint-Étienne and US Créteil.

== Managerial career ==
After his playing career, he became a coach with US Créteil, RC Lens, Cameroon and Liberia. He was also an assistant coach at Stade Rennais.
