= Michel Bensoussan =

French footballer (born 1954)

Personal information
- Date of birth: 5 January 1954 (age 72)
- Place of birth: Pau, France
- Position: Goalkeeper

Youth career
- –1974: Pau

Senior career*
Years	Team	Apps	(Gls)
1974–1980	Paris Saint-Germain	23	(0)
1978–1979	→ Paris FC (loan)	28	(0)
1980–1985	Rouen	170	(0)
1985–1989	Caen	122	(0)
1989–1990	Paris Saint-Germain	0	(0)
Total		343	(0)

International career
1984	France Olympic		
- * Club domestic league appearances and goals

Michel Bensoussan (born 5 January 1954) is a French former professional footballer who played as a goalkeeper. He was a member of the French squad that won the gold medal at the 1984 Summer Olympics in Los Angeles, California, United States. During his career, he notably played for Paris Saint-Germain, Paris FC, Rouen, and Caen.
