= Gilles Brisson =

French football player and manager (born 1958)

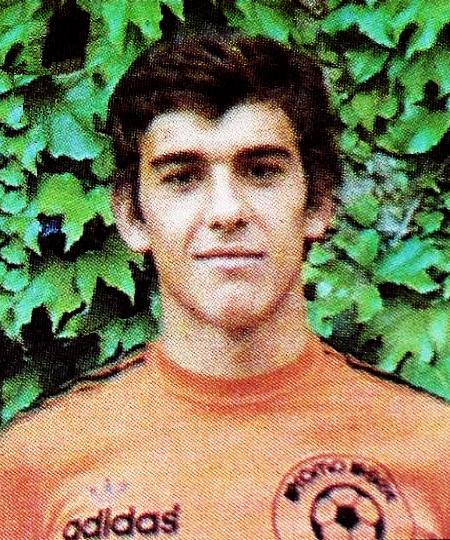
- Brisson with Toulouse in 1978

Personal information
- Date of birth: 9 April 1958 (age 68)
- Place of birth: Saintes, France
- Position: Defender

Youth career
- 1968–1976: AS Bourg-la-Reine
- 1976–1977: Paris Saint-Germain

Senior career*
| Years | Team | Apps | (Gls) |
| 1977–1978 | Paris Saint-Germain | 7 | (0) |
| 1978–1986 | Toulouse | 151 | (0) |
| 1981–1982 | → Paris FC (loan) | 25 | (0) |
| 1986–1988 | Sochaux | 43 | (0) |
| 1988–1989 | Dunkerque | 13 | (0) |
| 1989–1991 | Perpignan | | |
| 1991–1992 | Arin Luzien | | |
| Total | | 239+ | (0+) |

Managerial career
- 1992–1994: US La Charité-sur-Loire
- 1994–1997: Figeac QF
- 1997–1998: Saintes
- 1998–2001: Rochefort
- 2002: Montauban
- Saint-Savinien-sur-Charente
- * Club domestic league appearances and goals

Gilles Brisson (born 9 April 1958) is a French former professional football player and manager. As a player, he was a defender. He notably played for Paris Saint-Germain, Toulouse, and Sochaux.

== Personal life ==
Gilles is the twin brother of François, who is also a former footballer. They played together at Paris Saint-Germain.

== Honours ==
=== Player ===
Sochaux

- Division 2: 1987–88
- Coupe de France runner-up: 1987–88

=== Manager ===
Rochefort

- Division d'Honneur Centre-Ouest: 1999–2000
