= François Brisson =

French footballer (born 1958)

Personal information
- Date of birth: 9 April 1958 (age 68)
- Place of birth: Saintes, France
- Height: 1.74 m (5 ft 9 in)
- Position: Winger

Youth career
- 1968–1975: AS Bourg-la-Reine

Senior career*
Years	Team	Apps	(Gls)
1975–1981	Paris Saint-Germain	81	(6)
1979–1980	→ Laval (loan)	38	(10)
1981–1985	Lens	143	(40)
1985–1986	Strasbourg	38	(10)
1986–1987	Marseille	31	(1)
1987–1989	Laval	58	(12)
1989–1990	Lyon	28	(7)
1990–1993	Lille	88	(17)
1994–1996	Montauban		
Total		505+	(103+)

International career
1983–1984	France Olympic	9	(3)
1982–1984	France	2	(0)

Managerial career
- 1994–1997: Montauban
- 1999–2000: Lens
- 2002–2003: Nîmes
Medal record
Men's football
Representing France
Olympic Games
Gold medal – first place	1984 Los Angeles	Team competition
- * Club domestic league appearances and goals

François Brisson (born 9 April 1958) is a French former professional football player and manager. A former winger, he is among the players with the most appearances in the Ligue 1, with 505 appearances to his name. As of 2021, he is a scout for Marseille.

== International career ==
Brisson obtained two international caps for the France national team during the 1980s. He was a member of the team that won the gold medal at the 1984 Summer Olympics in Los Angeles, scoring in the gold medal game itself.

== Personal life ==
François's twin brother Gilles is also a former footballer.

== Honours ==
=== Player ===
Marseille

- Coupe de France runner-up: 1986–87

France Olympic

- Summer Olympic Games: 1984

=== Manager ===
Montauban

- National 3: 1995–96
