= Michel Kitabdjian =

French football referee (1930–2020)

Michel Kitabdjian (7 May 1930 – 17 March 2020) was a French referee. He officiated at the 1975 European Cup final between Leeds United and Bayern Munich, disallowing a goal by Leeds United's Peter Lorimer for offside and denying Leeds two penalty appeals as Franz Beckenbauer first allegedly handled the ball in the box and then brought down Allan Clarke in a tackle. Leeds fans became angry at the referee, and one fan managed to access the playing field after the final whistle. After gendarmes removed him, other Leeds fans began rioting in the stands as a result of feeling robbed by the result. Kitabdjian was rated incredibly poorly by FIFA officials observing the game but was never formally investigated.

Kitabdjian also served as a FIFA referee. He officiated at the 1968 Olympic tournament in Mexico City, as well as qualifiers for the 1966, 1970, 1974, and 1978 World Cups, and the 1968, 1972, and 1976 European Championships.

Kitabdjian had Armenian roots. He died on 17 March 2020 at the age of 89.

Preceded by 1974 (Belgium) Alfred Delcourt	European Cup Final referee 1975	Succeeded by 1976 (Hungary) Károly Palotai
