= Carlos Bianchi =

Argentine football player and manager

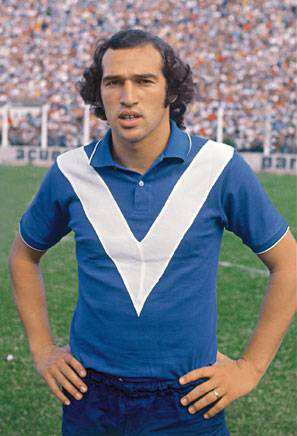
- Bianchi with Vélez Sarsfield c. 1970

Personal information
- Full name: Carlos Bianchi
- Date of birth: 26 April 1949 (age 77)
- Place of birth: Buenos Aires, Argentina
- Height: 1.78 m (5 ft 10 in)
- Position: Forward

Youth career
- Unión de Paz
- Ciclón de Jonte
- 1960–1967: Vélez Sarsfield

Senior career*
Years	Team	Apps	(Gls)
1967–1973	Vélez Sarsfield	165	(121)
1973–1977	Reims	124	(107)
1977–1979	Paris Saint-Germain	74	(64)
1979–1980	Strasbourg	22	(8)
1980–1984	Vélez Sarsfield	159	(85)
1984–1985	Reims	18	(8)
Total		562	(393)

International career
1970–1972	Argentina	14	(8)

Managerial career
- 1985–1988: Reims
- 1989–1990: Nice
- 1993–1996: Vélez Sarsfield
- 1996–1997: Roma
- 1998–2001: Boca Juniors
- 2003–2004: Boca Juniors
- 2005–2006: Atlético Madrid
- 2013–2014: Boca Juniors
- * Club domestic league appearances and goals

Carlos Bianchi (born 26 April 1949), nicknamed El Virrey (The Viceroy), is an Argentine former football player and manager. A prolific goalscorer, although he had a bright career as a forward in Argentina and France, Bianchi is best known as one of the most successful coaches of all time managing Vélez Sarsfield and Boca Juniors to a great number of titles each. Bianchi is the only coach to win four Copa Libertadores.

He is also the only coach to secure three Intercontinental Cups, and shares with Josep Guardiola and Carlo Ancelotti a joint record of three club world championship titles. He most recently served as manager of Boca Juniors. Boca Juniors and Vélez Sársfield made him a statue.

== Biography ==
Born in Buenos Aires, Bianchi was raised in a middle-class family. In 1972, he married Margaret Mary Pilla, and they had two children: Mauro Carlos and Brenda. Now has four grandchildren: Paul, Carlos and Louis (who are sons of Mauro) and Mateo (son of Brenda and Huracán defender Eduardo Dominguez). His father worked in a sales position in which Carlos regularly helped until he made his debut as a player in first-division football for Vélez Sarsfield, the club which he was a fan of.

During his tenure as coach of Vélez Sarsfield he was known as the "Virrey" (viceroy, in Spanish), named by sports writer Victor Hugo Morales. The reason is based on footballing and historical grounds, as Bianchi obtained several titles as a player and coach with Vélez Sarsfield. The club is located in the neighbourhood of Liniers alluding to the Virrey Liniers, who was in command of the Viceroyalty of the Río de la Plata by early 1800.

== Playing career ==
=== Beginning and consolidation ===
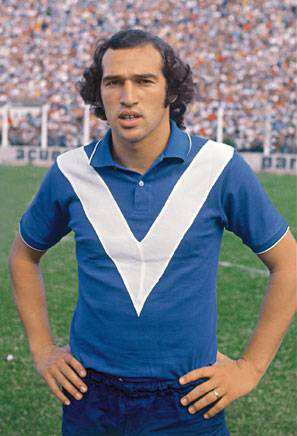
Bianchi in Vélez Sársfield, c. 1970

Like so many other Argentine men's footballers, Bianchi gave his first steps playing "baby fútbol", a five-a-side variant of futsal mainly played by children and youth, practised on smaller surfaces (usually parquetry, cement or synthetic grass). At 11 years old, Bianchi started playing for Club Ciclón de Jonte, a type of subsidiary of Vélez Sarsfield A representative of the club saw Bianchi's potential and took him to play at the youth divisions of Vélez Sársfield. By the time he was 16 yo, Bianchi had been promoted to the third division.

Bianchi was finally promoted to the first squad by Vélez Sarsfield manager Victorio Spinetto, making his debut with the team at the age of 18 in a 1–1 tie against Boca Juniors. One year later, Bianchi scored his first goal in Primera v Argentinos Juniors, on July 7, 1968. One week later, Bianchi broke the long-standing Amadeo Carrizo's record of 769 minutes with his goal unbeaten.

With only 19 years old, Bianchi was part of the Vélez Sarsfield team that won the 1968 Nacional championship and was consecrated as the top scorer of 1970 Nacional championship with 18 goals and 1971 Metropolitano with 36. His good performances with the team and a serious injury of forward Omar Wehbe allowed Bianchi to be the centre forward of Vélez Sársfield.

=== European career ===
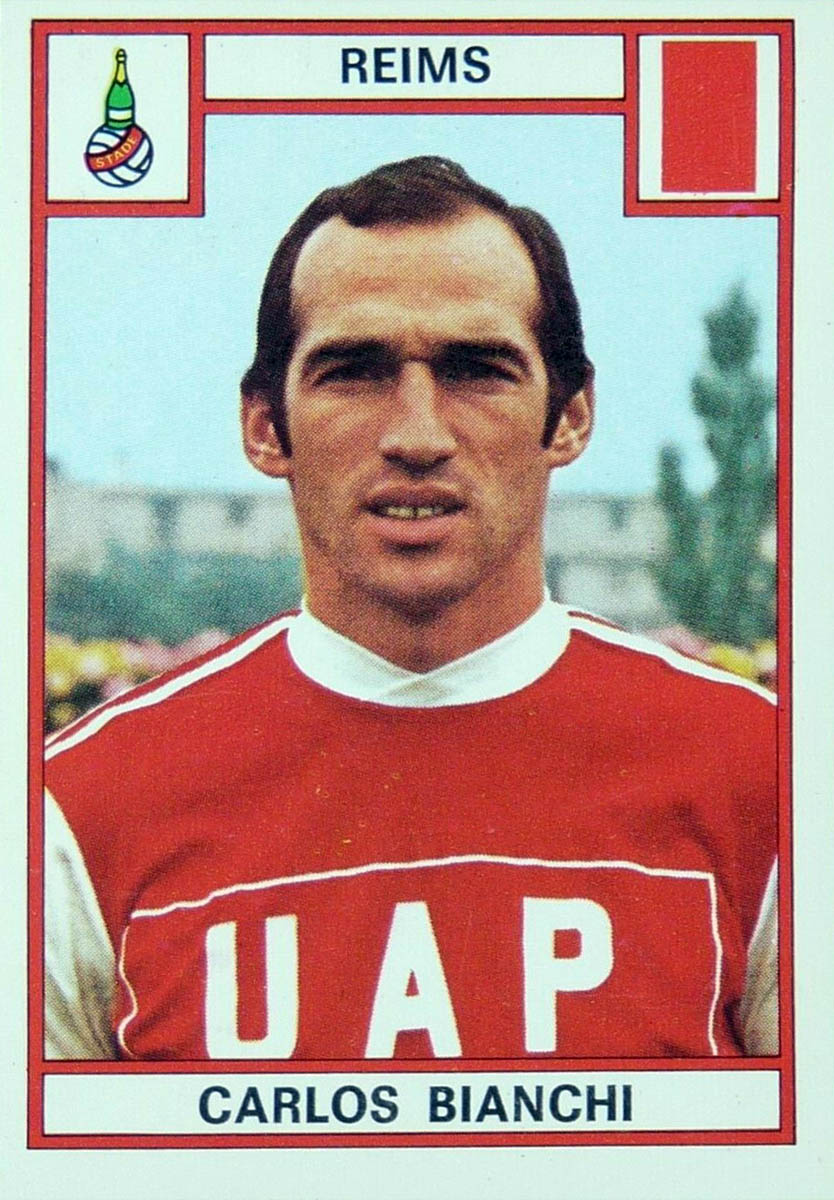
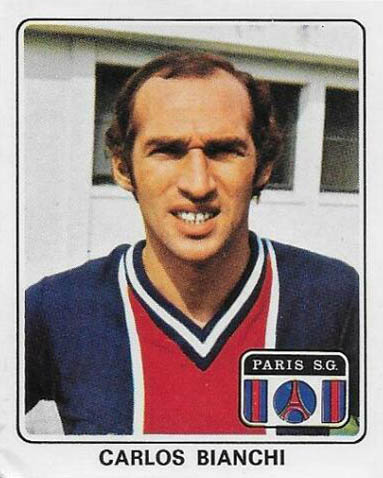
Football cards issued by Panini displaying Bianchi as player of Reims (1975) and Paris St. Germain (1979)

In 1973, Bianchi was signed by Reims, a French team of Ligue 1. In his first season with the club, Bianchi was the top scorer of the league with 30 goals. Some of his most notable achievements in that year included the six goals scored in the 6–1 win over Paris Saint-Germain. Bianchi was seriously injured in a friendly match v Barcelona at Parc des Princes so he missed the season. After he recovered, Bianchi became the top scorer of the league once more, scoring 34 goals in 1975–76 and 28 in 1976–77.

During his tenure at Reims, Bianchi showed his scoring touch, scoring 107 goals in four seasons and being the top scorer in the French championship in 1974, 1976 and 1977 marking 30, 34 and 28 goals, respectively. In 1977, he joined Paris Saint-Germain in which Bianchi was again the top scorer of the league in two seasons spent in the club. Because of the club's financial problems, Bianchi was transferred to Paris St. Germain in 1977.

In his first season with the Parisian club, Bianchi scored 37 goals in 38 matches, being also named best player of the season. The next season, 1978–79, Bianchi was the top scorer again with 27 goals. Despite those outstanding individual performances, PSG did not achieve any title; on the contrary, their performance was very poor, finishing eleventh. and 13th in the last seasons. Because of that, Bianchi chose to move to a more competitive team.

When I was part of the team, PSG was a more modest team, with less attacking power. But despite that, I scored 37 goals in 38 league matches during my first season with the club. I had intuition, I knew where the ball was about to be. It's that being a scorer was my life.

— Carlos Bianchi

In the 1979–80 season, he played for Strasbourg, without success, scoring only eight goals. Bianchi returned to his home country in 1980 to play for Vélez Sarsfield, where he became top scorer in the 1981 with 15 goals. He would return to Stade de Reims, where he would retire in 1984.

Bianchi is the top scorer in the history of Vélez Sarsfield with 206 goals and ninth overall in Argentine football. He is also the 9th top scorer in the history of the French League with his 179 goals. After his retirement, Bianchi is recognized by FIFA as Argentina's top scorer in the history of first division tournaments of the world, scoring a total of 385 goals (206 in Argentina and 179 in France) surpassing Alfredo Di Stefano (377 goals) and Delio Onnis (352 goals, 53 in Argentina and 299 in France), a great merit not recognized by many due to his coaching career greatly overshadowing his days as a player. Carlos Bianchi is the 8th top scorer in the history of first-division football.

He also earned 14 caps for Argentina, scoring 7 goals, during the period from 1970 to 1972.

=== Return to Vélez Sarsfield ===
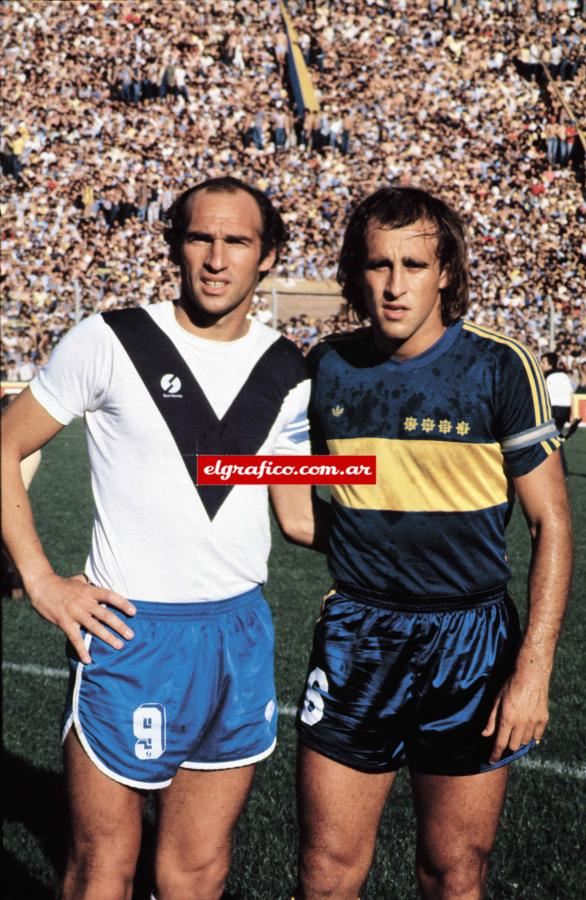
Bianchi returned to Vélez Sarsfield in 1981. In the image, he poses with Boca Juniors' legend Roberto Mouzo that same year

At the end of the French season, Bianchi returned to his home country to play for Vélez Sarsfield, becoming the top scorer of 1981 Nacional with 15 goals. His last season in Argentina was in the 1984 Metropolitano, where he played his last match with Vélez Sarsfield, a 1–2 defeat to Boca Juniors at José Amalfitani Stadium on July 1, 1984. Bianchi remains as all-time top scorer for Vélez Sarsfield, with 206 goals in 324 matches with the team.

=== Retirement in France ===
Bianchi returned to French football in 1984–85 to play for Reims, his first team in Europe, which was playing in Ligue 2 (Second Division). Nevertheless, the club did not make a good performance, finishing 12th. of Group A. Bianchi was not the temible scorer of his glory days, either. He only scored eight goals in the season and then retired from football. Nevertheless, Bianchi would stay in Reims after becoming manager of the team and being in charge during the 1985–86 season.

== Managerial career ==
=== France ===
Bianchi made his debut as manager in March 1985 with Reims (where he had previously retired as player), spending three seasons in the Second Division without achieving promotion to the Ligue 1, despite the team reaching the semi-finals of Coupe de France twice. After his tenure with Reims, Bianchi was hired by Nice in Ligue 1, coaching the club in 24 matches between 1989 and 1990. Nice remained in the top division after beating Strasbourg in a playoff with an aggregate score of 7–3.

=== Argentina ===
Bianchi returned to Argentina in December 1992 to coach Vélez Sarsfield, the club where he had debuted, in place of Eduardo Luján Manera. His first match on the bench was on February 21, 1993, when Vélez beat Deportivo Español 2–0 with two goals by Omar Asad in the first round of the 1993 Clausura season. Vélez won that championship with 27 points in 19 matches played, achieving their 2nd league title.

As Argentine champion, Vélez qualified to 1994 Copa Libertadores, where the team shared a group with strong and experienced rivals such as Boca Juniors and Brazilian Cruzeiro, and Palmeiras. Nevertheless, Vélez placed 1st in the zone; therefore, the squad qualified for the next stage. Vélez would then eliminate Defensor, Minervén, and Atlético Junior to face defending champions São Paulo in the finals. After both teams won one game each by the same score (10), a penalty shootout was run to decide a champion. After José Luis Chilavert stopped one shot and Roberto Pompei scored, Vélez Sarsfield won the series, achieving their first Copa Libertadores trophy. The next step was the 1994 Intercontinental Cup, where Bianchi led Vélez Sarsfield to win their second international title after beating Milan 2–0. Vélez would go on to win two more league titles with Bianchi, establishing the most successful period in the club's history.

After a brief passage in the Italian club Roma, Bianchi returned to Argentina to coach Boca Juniors. In two stints in the club, Bianchi won four league titles, three Copa Libertadores titles and two Intercontinental Cup titles, becoming the club's most successful manager.

== Career statistics ==
Bianchi is regarded as one of the best forwards of all time, because of his impressive record of goals scored both in France and Argentina. He is the all-time top scorer of Vélez Sarsfield with 206 goals. He is also one of the all-time top scorers of the French Division 1 with 179 goals scored.

=== Club ===
Appearances and goals by club, season and competition
Club	Season	League			National cup (Note: Includes Coupe de France)		Continental		Total	
Club	Season	Division	Apps	Goals	Apps	Goals	Apps	Goals	Apps	Goals
Vélez Sarsfield	1967–68	Primera División	3	0	—		—		3	0
Vélez Sarsfield	1968–69	Primera División	18	9	—		—		18	9
Vélez Sarsfield	1969–70	Primera División	27	17	—		—		27	17
Vélez Sarsfield	1970–71	Primera División	23	20	—		—		23	20
Vélez Sarsfield	1971–72	Primera División	46	42	—		—		46	42
Vélez Sarsfield	1972–73	Primera División	37	27	—		—		37	27
Vélez Sarsfield	1973–74	Primera División	11	6	—		—		11	6
Vélez Sarsfield	Total		165	121	—		—		165	121
Reims	1973–74	Division 1	33	30	8	8	—		41	38
Reims	1974–75	Division 1	16	15	—		—		16	15
Reims	1975–76	Division 1	38	34	5	5	—		43	39
Reims	1976–77	Division 1	37	28	7	10	—		44	38
Reims	Total		124	107	20	23	—		144	130
Paris Saint-Germain	1977–78	Division 1	38	37	3	2	—		41	39
Paris Saint-Germain	1978–79	Division 1	36	27	3	5	—		39	32
Paris Saint-Germain	Total		74	64	6	7	—		80	71
Strasbourg	1979–80	Division 1	22	8	—		3 (Note: Appearances in European Cup)	3	25	11
Vélez Sarsfield	1980–81	Primera División	9	5	—		—		9	5
Vélez Sarsfield	1981–82	Primera División	44	21	—		—		44	21
Vélez Sarsfield	1982–83	Primera División	50	29	—		—		50	29
Vélez Sarsfield	1983–84	Primera División	39	24	—		—		39	24
Vélez Sarsfield	1984–85	Primera División	17	6	—		—		17	6
Vélez Sarsfield	Total		159	85	—		—		159	85
Reims	1984–85	Division 2	18	8	—		—		18	8
Career total			562	393	26	30	3	3	591	426

=== Manager ===
Managerial record by team and tenure
Team	From	To	Record				
Team	From	To	P	W	D	L	Win %
Reims	1 July 1985	30 June 1988	114	53	27	34	46.5
Nice	1 July 1989	30 June 1990	38	9	13	16	23.7
Vélez Sarsfield	1 July 1993	30 June 1996	129	63	39	27	48.8
Roma	1 July 1996	7 April 1997	31	12	9	10	38.7
Boca Juniors	9 July 1998	31 December 2001	159	89	47	23	56.0
Boca Juniors	1 January 2003	4 July 2004	83	48	20	15	57.8
Atlético Madrid	1 July 2005	12 January 2006	21	6	8	7	28.6
Boca Juniors	1 January 2013	28 August 2014	53	22	13	18	41.5
Total			628	302	176	150	48.1

== Honours ==
=== Player ===
Vélez Sarsfield

- Primera División: 1968 Nacional

Stade de Reims

- Coupe de France runner-up: 1976-77

=== Manager ===
Vélez Sarsfield

- Primera División: 1993 Clausura, 1995 Apertura, 1996 Clausura
- Copa Libertadores: 1994
- Intercontinental Cup: 1994
- Copa Interamericana: 1996

Boca Juniors

- Primera División: 1998 Apertura, 1999 Clausura, 2000 Apertura, 2003 Apertura
- Copa Libertadores: 2000, 2001, 2003
- Intercontinental Cup: 2000, 2003

=== Individual ===
- Argentine Primera División Top scorer: 1970, 1971, 1981
- French Division 1 Top Scorer: 1973–74, 1975–76, 1976–77, 1977–78, 1978–79
- French Division 1 Foreign Player of the Year: 1974
- South American Coach of the Year: 1994, 1998, 2000, 2001, 2003
- IFFHS World's Best Club Coach: 2000, 2003
