= 1979–80 French Division 2 =

41st season of the second-tier football league in France

Division 2
- Season: 1979–80

Statistics of Division 2 in the 1979/1980 season.

== Overview ==
It was contested by 36 teams, and Tours and Auxerre won the championship.

== League tables ==
=== Group A ===
| Pos | Team | Pld | W | D | L | GF | GA | GD | Pts | Promotion or relegation |
|---|---|---|---|---|---|---|---|---|---|---|
| 1 | Tours | 34 | 22 | 7 | 5 | 59 | 26 | +33 | 51 | Promoted |
| 2 | Stade Rennais | 34 | 20 | 6 | 8 | 60 | 30 | +30 | 46 | |
| 3 | En Avant Guingamp | 34 | 19 | 8 | 7 | 53 | 36 | +17 | 46 | |
| 4 | Besançon | 34 | 14 | 11 | 9 | 53 | 39 | +14 | 39 | |
| 5 | Noeux-les-Mines | 34 | 16 | 7 | 11 | 45 | 35 | +10 | 39 | |
| 6 | Stade Reims | 34 | 13 | 11 | 10 | 41 | 35 | +6 | 37 | |
| 7 | Le Havre | 34 | 15 | 8 | 11 | 45 | 32 | +13 | 38 | |
| 8 | Rouen | 34 | 16 | 6 | 12 | 44 | 36 | +8 | 38 | |
| 9 | Angoulême | 34 | 9 | 18 | 7 | 38 | 24 | +14 | 36 | |
| 10 | Dunkerque | 34 | 11 | 9 | 14 | 39 | 38 | +1 | 31 | |
| 11 | Orléans | 34 | 9 | 12 | 13 | 34 | 44 | −10 | 30 | |
| 12 | Stade Quimpérois | 34 | 11 | 7 | 16 | 38 | 55 | −17 | 29 | |
| 13 | Blois | 34 | 9 | 9 | 16 | 28 | 50 | −22 | 27 | |
| 14 | Berrichonne Chateauroux | 34 | 8 | 10 | 16 | 42 | 55 | −13 | 26 | |
| 15 | Limoges | 34 | 8 | 10 | 16 | 30 | 44 | −14 | 26 | |
| 16 | Montmorillon | 34 | 8 | 10 | 16 | 37 | 58 | −21 | 26 | |
| 17 | Amicale de Lucé | 34 | 8 | 7 | 19 | 30 | 62 | −32 | 23 | Relegated |
| 18 | Chaumont | 34 | 7 | 8 | 19 | 35 | 53 | −18 | 22 | Relegated |

Source: rsssf.com

=== Group B ===
| Pos | Team | Pld | W | D | L | GF | GA | GD | Pts | Promotion or relegation |
|---|---|---|---|---|---|---|---|---|---|---|
| 1 | Auxerre | 34 | 16 | 12 | 6 | 54 | 30 | +24 | 44 | Promoted |
| 2 | Avignon | 34 | 20 | 4 | 10 | 54 | 41 | +13 | 44 | |
| 3 | Cannes | 34 | 15 | 10 | 9 | 54 | 36 | +18 | 40 | |
| 4 | Thonon | 34 | 14 | 11 | 9 | 47 | 37 | +10 | 39 | |
| 5 | Gueugnon | 34 | 12 | 13 | 9 | 54 | 37 | +17 | 37 | |
| 6 | Toulouse | 34 | 14 | 9 | 11 | 47 | 34 | +13 | 37 | |
| 7 | Paris | 34 | 11 | 15 | 8 | 41 | 34 | +7 | 37 | |
| 8 | Montpellier | 34 | 14 | 8 | 12 | 55 | 42 | +13 | 36 | |
| 9 | Béziers | 34 | 14 | 8 | 12 | 42 | 37 | +5 | 36 | |
| 10 | Martigues | 34 | 11 | 13 | 10 | 43 | 41 | +2 | 35 | |
| 11 | Thionville FC | 34 | 10 | 11 | 13 | 38 | 49 | −11 | 31 | |
| 12 | Montluçon | 34 | 9 | 12 | 13 | 34 | 40 | −6 | 30 | |
| 13 | Gazélec Ajaccio | 34 | 9 | 12 | 13 | 36 | 56 | −20 | 30 | |
| 14 | Tavaux-Damparis | 34 | 11 | 7 | 16 | 38 | 54 | −16 | 29 | |
| 15 | Saint-Dié | 34 | 9 | 10 | 15 | 40 | 63 | −23 | 28 | |
| 16 | Mulhouse | 34 | 8 | 11 | 15 | 34 | 45 | −11 | 27 | Relegated |
| 17 | Toulon | 34 | 8 | 11 | 15 | 36 | 48 | −12 | 27 | Relegated |
| 18 | Olympique Alès | 34 | 8 | 9 | 17 | 37 | 60 | −23 | 25 | Relegated |

Source: rsssf.com

== Championship play-offs ==
| Team 1 | Agg. | Team 2 | 1st leg | 2nd leg |
|---|---|---|---|---|
| Auxerre | 4–1 | Tours | 4–0 | 0–2 |

== Promotion play-offs ==
| Team 1 | Agg. | Team 2 | 1st leg | 2nd leg |
|---|---|---|---|---|
| Avignon | 3–2 | Rennes | 3–2 | 0–0 |

Avignon was qualified to the play-off against 18th placed team of Division 1, Lyon.
