= Mustapha Dahleb =

Algerian footballer (born 1952)

Personal information
- Date of birth: 8 February 1952 (age 74)
- Place of birth: Béjaïa, Algeria
- Height: 1.77 m (5 ft 10 in)
- Position: Midfielder

Senior career*
| Years | Team | Apps | (Gls) |
| 1969–1974 | Sedan | 4 | (0) |
| 1971–1973 | → CR Belouizdad | 20 | (12) |
| 1974–1984 | Paris Saint-Germain | 268 | (85) |
| 1984–1985 | Nice | 19 | (3) |
| Total | | 383 | (131) |

International career
| 1971–1983 | Algeria | 20 | (6) |
- * Club domestic league appearances and goals

Mustapha Dahleb (born 8 February 1952) is an Algerian former professional footballer who played as a midfielder. Having begun his career at Sedan and CR Belouizdad, he spent most of his career at Paris Saint-Germain before playing a final season at Nice. At the international level, Dahleb represented the Algeria national team.

He holds the records of being the fourth-highest goalscorer for Paris Saint-Germain in the French first division and seventh all-time goalscorer in all competitions.

== Career ==
Dahleb played with the Algeria national team in the 1982 FIFA World Cup, where Algeria failed to progress past the group stage.

He held the record for being the all-time leading scorer for Paris Saint-Germain in the French first division with 85 goals before being surpassed by Zlatan Ibrahimovic. Dahleb is the club's sixth all-time goalscorer in all competitions, with 98 goals.
