= 1975–76 Paris Saint-Germain FC season =

6th season of Paris Saint-Germain FC

Paris Saint-Germain
1975–76 season
- President: Daniel Hechter
- Manager: Robert Vicot; Just Fontaine
- Stadium: Parc des Princes; Stade Yves-du-Manoir
- Ligue 1: 14th
- Coupe de France: Quarter-finals
- Top goalscorer: League: François M'Pelé; Mustapha Dahleb (12 each); All: François M'Pelé (18)
- Average home league attendance: 17,249
Home colours	Away colours	Third colours

The 1975–76 season was the 6th season in the history of Paris Saint-Germain FC. PSG played most of their home league matches at the Parc des Princes, while also hosting one match at the Stade Yves-du-Manoir, attracting an average of 17,249 spectators per match. The club's president was Daniel Hechter. The team was managed by Robert Vicot until August 1975, with Just Fontaine taking over in September 1975. Jean-Pierre Dogliani served as captain. PSG finished 14th in Ligue 1 and reached the quarter-finals of the Coupe de France. François M'Pelé was the team's top scorer, netting 18 goals in all competitions, including 12 in the league, while Mustapha Dahleb also contributed 12 league goals.

== Players ==
=== Squad ===
Players who featured in at least one official match for the club.

Note: Flags indicate national team as defined under FIFA eligibility rules; some limited exceptions apply. Players may hold more than one non-FIFA nationality.

No.	Pos.	Nation	Player
—	GK	YUG	Ilija Pantelić
—	GK	FRA	Michel Bensoussan
—	DF	FRA	Jacky Novi
—	DF	FRA	Jacky Bade
—	DF	FRA	Dominique Berthaud
—	DF	FRA	Gérard Cenzato
—	DF	FRA	Louis Cardiet
—	DF	POR	Humberto Coelho
—	DF	FRA	Dominique Lokoli
—	DF	FRA	Thierry Morin
—	DF	FRA	Jean-Marc Pilorget
—	DF	FRA	André Travetto
—	DF	FRA	Dominique Barberat
—	MF	FRA	Denis Bauda

No.	Pos.	Nation	Player
—	MF	FRA	Bernard Dumot
—	MF	FRA	Lionel Justier
—	MF	FRA	Bernard Moraly
—	MF	FRA	Francis Piasecki
—	MF	ALG	Mustapha Dahleb
—	MF	FRA	Jacques Laposte
—	MF	FRA	Robin Leclerc
—	FW	FRA	Jean-Pierre Dogliani (captain)
—	FW	FRA	François Brisson
—	FW	FRA	Guy Nosibor
—	FW	FRA	Louis Floch
—	FW	TOG	Pierre-Antoine Dossevi
—	FW	CGO	François M'Pelé
—	FW	CMR	Jean-Pierre Tokoto

=== Out on loan ===
Players who were loaned out to other clubs during the season.

Note: Flags indicate national team as defined under FIFA eligibility rules; some limited exceptions apply. Players may hold more than one non-FIFA nationality.

No. / Pos. / Nation / Player; — / DF / FRA / Éric Renaut (at Sochaux)	No. / Pos. / Nation / Player; — / FW / FRA / Christian André (at Red Star)

== Transfers ==
=== Arrivals ===
Players who signed for the club.

Note: Flags indicate national team as defined under FIFA eligibility rules; some limited exceptions apply. Players may hold more than one non-FIFA nationality.

No.	Pos.	Nation	Player
—	DF	FRA	Dominique Berthaud (from Évreux AC)
—	DF	POR	Humberto Coelho (from Benfica)
—	DF	FRA	André Travetto (from Bastia)
—	DF	FRA	Dominique Barberat (from Voltaire Châtenay-Malabry SS)
—	DF	FRA	Thierry Morin (from PSG Youth Academy)
—	DF	FRA	Jean-Marc Pilorget (from PSG Youth Academy)

No.	Pos.	Nation	Player
—	MF	FRA	Lionel Justier (from Boulogne-Billancourt)
—	MF	FRA	Francis Piasecki (from Sochaux)
—	MF	FRA	Bernard Moraly (from PSG Youth Academy)
—	FW	FRA	François Brisson (from AS Bourg-la-Reine)
—	FW	TOG	Pierre-Antoine Dossevi (from Tours)
—	FW	CMR	Jean-Pierre Tokoto (from Bordeaux)

=== Departures ===
Players who left the club.

Note: Flags indicate national team as defined under FIFA eligibility rules; some limited exceptions apply. Players may hold more than one non-FIFA nationality.

No.	Pos.	Nation	Player
—	GK	FRA	Jacky Planchard (to Lille)
—	DF	FRA	Bernard Béréau (Free agent)
—	DF	FRA	Christian Quéré (to Fontainebleau)
—	DF	FRA	Patrice Zbinden (to Poissy)

No.	Pos.	Nation	Player
—	MF	FRA	Jean Deloffre (to Grenoble)
—	MF	ITA	Albert Poli (to Rennes)
—	FW	TOG	Othniel Dossevi (to Paris FC)
—	FW	FRA	Michel Marella (to Cannes)

== Kits ==
RTL was the shirt sponsor, and Kopa was the kit supplier.

Home	Away	Third

== Competitions ==
=== Overview ===
Competition	First match	Last match	Starting round	Final position	Record							
Competition	First match	Last match	Starting round	Final position	Pld	W	D	L	GF	GA	GD	Win %
Ligue 1	8 August 1975	19 June 1976	Matchday 1	14th	38	13	11	14	63	60	+3	34.21
Coupe de France	31 January 1976	7 May 1976	Round of 64	Quarter-finals	7	3	3	1	13	7	+6	42.86
Total					45	16	14	15	76	67	+9	35.56

Source: Competitions

=== Ligue 1 ===
==== League table ====
Pos	Team	Pld	W	D	L	GF	GA	GD	BP	Pts
12	Valenciennes	38	13	10	15	44	54	−10	4	40
13	Lille	38	14	8	16	59	73	−14	4	40
14	Paris Saint-Germain	38	13	11	14	63	60	+3	2	39
15	Lens	38	10	16	12	58	66	−8	2	38
16	Lyon	38	13	7	18	55	61	−6	4	37

Source: Histoire du PSG
Rules for classification: 1) points; 2) goal difference; 3) number of goals scored.
Victory: 2 points, Draw: 1 point, Defeat: 0 points, a bonus of 1 point for winning by three or more goals in a match

==== Results by round ====
Round	1	2	3	4	5	6	7	8	9	10	11	12	13	14	15	16	17	18	19	20	21	22	23	24	25	26	27	28	29	30	31	32	33	34	35	36	37	38
Ground	A	A	H	A	H	A	H	H	A	H	A	H	A	H	A	H	A	H	A	H	A	H	A	H	A	A	H	A	H	A	H	A	H	A	H	A	H	H
Result	L	D	W	D	W	D	L	D	L	D	L	W	W	W	L	W	L	L	L	L	D	W	W	W	L	L	D	L	W	D	L	D	W	W	D	W	L	D
Position	19	17	7	7	6	6	6	8	11	12	15	12	12	6	9	8	13	15	14	15	16	15	14	14	14	14	14	16	16	15	16	16	14	13	13	11	11	14

Source: Histoire du PSG
A = Away; H = Home; W = Win; D = Draw; L = Loss

==== Matches ====
8 August 1975 1	Bastia	3–0	Paris Saint-Germain	Furiani
	Lenoir 55', 72'; Franceschetti 76'	Report		Stadium: Stade Armand-Cesari; Attendance: 11,675; Referee: Michel Vautrot

13 August 1975 2	Reims	1–1	Paris Saint-Germain	Reims
	Bianchi 18'	Report	Floch 48'	Stadium: Stade Auguste-Delaune; Attendance: 14,591; Referee: Michel Kitabdjian

22 August 1975 3	Paris Saint-Germain	6–2	Avignon	Paris
	M'Pelé 10', 70'; Dahleb 15'; Tokoto 33'; Coelho 50'; Laposte 76'	Report	Giordani 30', 80'	Stadium: Parc des Princes; Attendance: 13,368; Referee: Jean-Marie Meeus

27 August 1975 4	Lens	3–3	Paris Saint-Germain	Lens
	Kaiser 16', 59'; Juraszek 36'	Report	Tokoto 45'; Piasecki 49', 79'	Stadium: Stade Bollaert-Delelis; Attendance: 21,490; Referee: Gabriel Besory

9 September 1975 5	Paris Saint-Germain	3–1	Metz	Paris
	Dogliani 15'; Piasecki 26'; Tokoto 65'	Report	Battiston 17'	Stadium: Parc des Princes; Attendance: 21,412; Referee: Georges Konrath

12 September 1975 6	Saint-Étienne	1–1	Paris Saint-Germain	Saint-Étienne
	Piazza 70'	Report	M'Pelé 87'	Stadium: Stade Geoffroy-Guichard; Attendance: 16,898; Referee: Michel Kitabdjian

20 September 1975 7	Paris Saint-Germain	2–3	Marseille	Paris
	Dogliani 29'; Floch 88'	Report	Bracci 37'; Emon 70'; Yazalde 72'	Stadium: Parc des Princes; Attendance: 38,210; Referee: Achille Verbecke

26 September 1975 8	Paris Saint-Germain	2–2	Lille	Paris
	Piasecki 54'; M'Pelé 71'	Report	Karasi 31', 55'	Stadium: Parc des Princes; Attendance: 15,572; Referee: René Vigliani

4 October 1975 9	Nice	2–1	Paris Saint-Germain	Nice
	Douis 42'; Musemić 60'	Report	Coelho 73'	Stadium: Stade du Ray; Attendance: 18,280; Referee: Robert Wurtz

17 October 1975 10	Paris Saint-Germain	2–2	Bordeaux	Paris
	Piasecki 61'; M'Pelé 82' (pen.)	Report	Giresse 6', 50'	Stadium: Parc des Princes; Attendance: 11,599; Referee: Michel Vautrot

25 October 1975 11	Nîmes	2–1	Paris Saint-Germain	Nîmes
	Boyron 1', 64'	Report	Floch 88'	Stadium: Stade Jean-Bouin; Attendance: 5,091; Referee: Marcel Bacou

31 October 1975 12	Paris Saint-Germain	1–0	Troyes	Paris
	M'Pelé 80'	Report		Stadium: Parc des Princes; Attendance: 10,673; Referee: Robert Héliès

8 November 1975 13	Nancy	2–4	Paris Saint-Germain	Tomblaine
	Rouyer 6'; Di Caro 40'	Report	Dahleb 5', 22', 83'; Tokoto 80'	Stadium: Stade Marcel Picot; Attendance: 9,354; Referee: Robert Frauciel

19 November 1975 14	Paris Saint-Germain	2–0	Valenciennes	Paris
	Coelho 32'; Laposte 82'	Report		Stadium: Parc des Princes; Attendance: 10,475; Referee: René Vigliani

22 November 1975 15	Lyon	2–0	Paris Saint-Germain	Lyon
	Chiesa 25', 73'	Report		Stadium: Stade de Gerland; Attendance: 6,343; Referee: Stéphane Frère

26 November 1975 16	Paris Saint-Germain	2–1	Nantes	Paris
	Tokoto 12', 76'	Report	Rampillon 16'	Stadium: Parc des Princes; Attendance: 22,640; Referee: Michel Kitabdjian

30 November 1975 17	Strasbourg	1–0	Paris Saint-Germain	Strasbourg
	Tonnel 82'	Report		Stadium: Stade de la Meinau; Attendance: 6,798; Referee: Guy Mouchotte

7 December 1975 18	Paris Saint-Germain	2–3	Sochaux	Paris
	M'Pelé 8'; Dossevi 86'	Report	Soler 4', 44'; Pintenat 50' (pen.)	Stadium: Parc des Princes; Attendance: 14,921; Referee: Achille Verbecke

14 December 1975 19	Monaco	3–0	Paris Saint-Germain	Monaco
	Rouquette 9', 17'; Onnis 65'	Report		Stadium: Stade Louis II; Attendance: 1,507; Referee: Marcel Bacou

21 December 1975 20	Paris Saint-Germain	2–3	Reims	Paris
	Coelho 32'; M'Pelé 53' (pen.)	Report	Santamaría 14'; Vergnes 42'; Bianchi 45' (pen.)	Stadium: Parc des Princes; Attendance: 31,976; Referee: Jean-Claude Martin

17 January 1976 21	Avignon	1–1	Paris Saint-Germain	Avignon
	Castellan 86'	Report	M'Pelé 23'	Stadium: Parc des Sports; Attendance: 3,648; Referee: Gabriel Besory

25 January 1976 22	Paris Saint-Germain	4–2	Lens	Paris
	Dogliani 41', 47'; Tokoto 60'; Dahleb 76'	Report	Bourloton 70'; Marx 81'	Stadium: Parc des Princes; Attendance: 20,351; Referee: Marcel Bacou

7 February 1976 23	Metz	1–2	Paris Saint-Germain	Metz
	Braun 62'	Report	M'Pelé 14' (pen.); Dahleb 71'	Stadium: Stade Saint-Symphorien; Attendance: 16,581; Referee: Alain Delmer

15 February 1976 24	Paris Saint-Germain	2–1	Saint-Étienne	Paris
	Dahleb 8', 69'	Report	Rocheteau 82'	Stadium: Parc des Princes; Attendance: 43,229; Referee: René Vigliani

22 February 1976 25	Marseille	2–1	Paris Saint-Germain	Marseille
	Florès 66', 70'	Report	Floch 80'	Stadium: Stade Vélodrome; Attendance: 16,368; Referee: Georges Konrath

12 March 1976 26	Lille	2–1	Paris Saint-Germain	Lille
	de Martigny 4'; Karasi 85'	Report	Justier 89'	Stadium: Stade Grimonprez-Jooris; Attendance: 9,799; Referee: Gabriel Besory

16 March 1976 27	Paris Saint-Germain	0–0	Nice	Paris
		Report		Stadium: Parc des Princes; Attendance: 32,186; Referee: Georges Konrath

20 March 1976 28	Bordeaux	2–1	Paris Saint-Germain	Bordeaux
	Lattuada 30' (pen.), 50'	Report	M'Pelé 70'	Stadium: Stade Chaban-Delmas; Attendance: 6,349; Referee: Alain Delmer

30 March 1976 29	Paris Saint-Germain	2–0	Nîmes	Paris
	Justier 28', 60'	Report		Stadium: Parc des Princes; Attendance: 9,770; Referee: Robert Wurtz

2 April 1976 30	Troyes	1–1	Paris Saint-Germain	Troyes
	Martinez 33'	Report	Nosibor 5'	Stadium: Stade de l'Aube; Attendance: 7,000; Referee: Jean-Claude Martin

15 April 1976 31	Paris Saint-Germain	1–4	Nancy	Paris
	Coelho 67'	Report	Raczynski 55'; Curbelo 60'; Cohuet 65'; Caron 80'	Stadium: Parc des Princes; Attendance: 7,342; Referee: Michel Kitabdjian

30 April 1976 32	Valenciennes	2–2	Paris Saint-Germain	Valenciennes
	Zaremba 7'; Jeskowiak 65'	Report	Dahleb 39'; Laposte 90'	Stadium: Stade Nungesser; Attendance: 9,892; Referee: René Vigliani

11 May 1976 33	Paris Saint-Germain	2–0	Lyon	Paris
	Barberat 43'; Laposte 89'	Report		Stadium: Parc des Princes; Attendance: 5,904; Referee: Jean-Marie Meeus

15 May 1976 34	Nantes	1–2	Paris Saint-Germain	Nantes
	Triantafyllos 31'	Report	Piasecki 53'; Coelho 70'	Stadium: Stade Marcel-Saupin; Attendance: 11,246; Referee: Michel Kitabdjian

25 May 1976 35	Paris Saint-Germain	0–0	Strasbourg	Paris
		Report		Stadium: Parc des Princes; Attendance: 7,693; Referee: René Vigliani

4 June 1976 36	Sochaux	1–4	Paris Saint-Germain	Montbéliard
	Pintenat 64'	Report	Dahleb 3', 76'; M'Pelé 53'; Floch 67'	Stadium: Stade Auguste-Bonal; Attendance: 9,294; Referee: Alain Delmer

16 June 1976 37	Paris Saint-Germain	1–2	Monaco	Paris
	Justier 19'	Report	Prost 45'; Onnis 55'	Stadium: Parc des Princes; Attendance: 7,170; Referee: Achille Verbecke

19 June 1976 38	Paris Saint-Germain	1–1	Bastia	Colombes
	Dahleb 80'	Report 1 Report 2	Zimako 66'	Stadium: Stade Yves-du-Manoir; Attendance: 3,239; Referee: Gabriel Besory

=== Coupe de France ===
==== Round of 64 ====
31 January 1976 Single leg	Paris Saint-Germain	3–1	Corbeil-Essonnes	Viry-Châtillon
	Laposte 11'; Justier 16'; Tokoto 22'	Report	Mill 77'	Stadium: Stade Henri Longuet; Attendance: 4,838; Referee: Jean-Marie Meeus

==== Round of 32 ====
28 February 1976 First leg	Lens	0–3	Paris Saint-Germain	Lens
		Report	M'Pelé 4', 27', 74'	Stadium: Stade Bollaert-Delelis; Attendance: 21,158; Referee: Michel Kitabdjian

7 March 1976 Second leg	Paris Saint-Germain	1–1 (4–1 agg.)	Lens	Paris
	M'Pelé 26'	Report	Sab 45'	Stadium: Parc des Princes; Attendance: 20,386; Referee: Robert Héliès

==== Round of 16 ====
6 April 1976 First leg	Paris Saint-Germain	3–0	Sète	Paris
	M'Pelé 72'; Coelho 78'; Bonnier 88' (o.g.)	Report		Stadium: Parc des Princes; Attendance: 9,294; Referee: Achille Verbecke

10 April 1976 Second leg	Sète	2–2 (2–5 agg.)	Paris Saint-Germain	Sète
	Granier 63' (pen.); Edwige 79'	Report	Justier 19'; M'Pelé 88'	Stadium: Georges-Bayrou Stadium; Attendance: 4,099; Referee: Guy Mouchotte

==== Quarter-finals ====
4 May 1976 First leg	Paris Saint-Germain	1–1	Lyon	Paris
	Floch 29'	Report	Lacombe 21'	Stadium: Parc des Princes; Attendance: 18,000; Referee: Georges Konrath

7 May 1976 Second leg	Lyon	2–0 (3–1 agg.)	Paris Saint-Germain	Lyon
	Lacombe 31'; Chiesa 75'	Report		Stadium: Stade de Gerland; Attendance: 25,000; Referee: Achille Verbecke

== Statistics ==
=== Appearances and goals ===
28 players featured in at least one official match, and the club scored 76 goals in official competitions, including one own goal.

Rank	Player	Position	Appearances	Goals	Source
1	(Republic of the Congo) François M'Pelé	FW	44	18	
2	(Socialist Federal Republic of Yugoslavia) Ilija Pantelić	GK	44	0	
3	(France) Francis Piasecki	MF	41	6	
4	(Portugal) Humberto Coelho	DF	39	7	
5	(Algeria) Mustapha Dahleb	MF	37	12	
6	(France) Denis Bauda	MF	36	0	
7	(France) Dominique Lokoli	DF	35	0	
8	(France) Jacky Novi	DF	35	0	
9	(Cameroon) Jean-Pierre Tokoto	FW	32	8	
10	(France) Jacques Laposte	MF	27	5	
11	(France) Lionel Justier	MF	24	6	
12	(France) Jean-Marc Pilorget	DF	21	0	
13	(France) Louis Floch	FW	20	6	
14	(France) Jean-Pierre Dogliani	FW	20	4	
15	(France) Dominique Berthaud	DF	15	0	
16	(France) Guy Nosibor	FW	10	1	
17	(France) André Travetto	DF	9	0	
18	(France) Jacky Bade	DF	8	0	
19	(France) Gérard Cenzato	DF	7	0	
20	(France) Dominique Barberat	DF	4	1	
21	(Togo) Pierre-Antoine Dossevi	FW	2	1	
22	(France) François Brisson	FW	2	0	
23	(France) Louis Cardiet	DF	2	0	
24	(France) Michel Bensoussan	GK	1	0	
25	(France) Bernard Dumot	MF	1	0	
26	(France) Robin Leclerc	MF	1	0	
27	(France) Bernard Moraly	MF	1	0	
28	(France) Thierry Morin	DF	1	0	
