= Paris derby =

Football rivalry in France

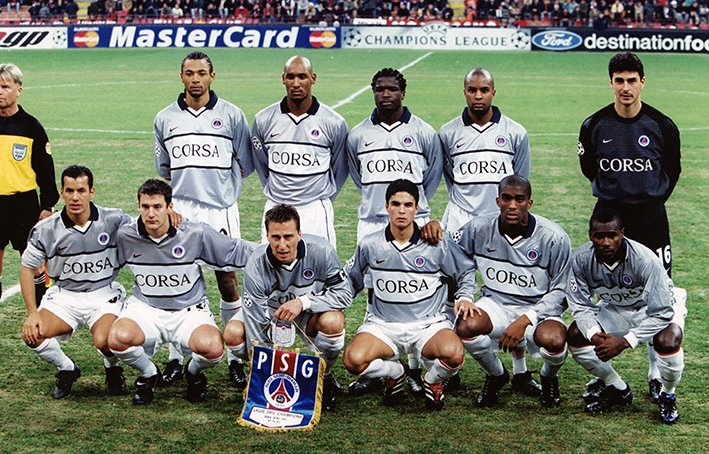
- PSG, the dominant club in Paris, in 2001.
- Other names: Derby de Paris, Derby de la Capitale, Le Derby Parisien
- Location: Paris
- Teams: Paris Saint-Germain FC; Paris FC
- First meeting: 18 August 1978; Division 1 Paris Saint-Germain 2–2 Paris FC
- Stadiums: Parc des Princes (PSG); Stade Jean-Bouin (Paris FC)

Statistics
- Total meetings: 5
- Most wins: Paris FC (2)
- Most player appearances: Alimami Gory (3)
- Top scorer: Carlos Bianchi (2); Alimami Gory (2)
- All-time record: Paris Saint-Germain: 1 Draw: 2 Paris FC: 2
- Largest victory: 4 January 2026; Ligue 1 Paris Saint-Germain 2–1 Paris FC

The Paris derby (French: Derby de Paris), also referred to as Derby de Paris, Derby de la Capitale, or Le Derby Parisien, is a French football rivalry contested between Paris Saint-Germain FC (PSG) and Paris FC (PFC), the two largest professional clubs based in Paris, France. The rivalry has roots in the history of football in Paris, where established clubs such as Racing Club de France Football and Red Star FC once competed for prominence.

PSG was founded in 1970 through the merger of Paris FC and Stade Saint-Germain, following an initiative to establish a major football club in the capital. After the two clubs split in 1972, PSG established itself as Paris's leading club, regularly competing in Ligue 1 and European competitions. Paris FC spent decades outside the top flight before returning to Ligue 1 in 2025.

Following Paris FC's promotion, the derby returned to the top flight. PSG's Parc des Princes and Paris FC's Stade Jean-Bouin are located close to one another in Paris's 16th arrondissement, making the fixture one of the geographically closest derbies in football. The first top-flight meeting between the clubs since 1990 took place at the Parc des Princes on 4 January 2026, with PSG winning 2–1. Paris FC later defeated PSG 1–0 in the Coupe de France, handing their rivals a home defeat in the competition.

The rivalry also extends to women's football, with Paris Saint-Germain FC (women) and Paris FC (women) competing at the highest level. Paris FC, formerly known as Juvisy, was a prominent force in French women's football during the 1990s and 2000s, while PSG emerged as a leading club during the 2010s. Paris FC subsequently established itself as another contender in the league, highlighted by its victory over PSG in the 2025 Coupe de France Féminine final.

== History ==
=== Merger, split and first derbies ===
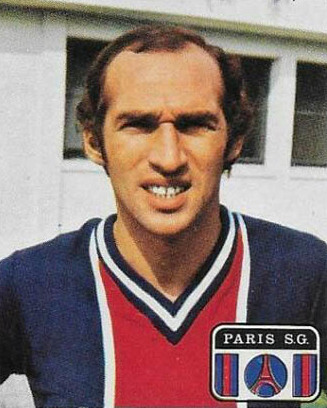
PSG's Carlos Bianchi netted two goals against PFC in 1978.

By the late 1960s, Racing Club de France Football, based in the northwestern suburb of Colombes, and Stade Français were confined to the amateur leagues, while Red Star FC, located in the northern suburb of Saint-Ouen-sur-Seine, had passed its prime. To address this void, the French Football Federation (FFF) initiated the creation of a major inner-city club. Paris FC (PFC) was officially founded in 1969, initially without players, a stadium, or a place in any league. A year later, in 1970, Paris FC merged with Stade Saint-Germain, a club from the western suburb of Saint-Germain-en-Laye that was then competing in Ligue 2. This merger gave rise to Paris Saint-Germain FC (PSG).

PSG won Ligue 2 in their first season, earning promotion to Ligue 1. In their inaugural top-flight campaign, they finished 16th and retained their status. However, the Council of Paris was dissatisfied that the capital's main club was based in the suburbs and threatened to withdraw financial support unless it changed its name to Paris FC. PSG president Henri Patrelle refused, and the club split on 20 June 1972. PSG kept their name but were administratively relegated to Ligue 3, while Paris FC remained in Ligue 1 and moved into the Parc des Princes for the 1972–73 season. PSG returned to Ligue 1 in 1974, the same season Paris FC was relegated, subsequently taking full control of the Parc des Princes and establishing themselves as the dominant club in Paris.

PSG and Paris FC first faced each other as separate clubs during the 1978–79 season. The first match, attended by 25,000 spectators, saw Argentine striker Carlos Bianchi open the scoring from the penalty spot after being fouled, beating former PSG goalkeeper Michel Bensoussan. Early in the second half, Bernard Lech equalized for PFC, before Éric Renaut restored PSG's lead with a header from a Dominique Bathenay free kick. Paris FC responded quickly, however, as Nebojša Zlatarić scored an acrobatic equalizer, and the game concluded in a 2–2 draw.

In the second derby, both sides were hampered by the pressure of the occasion, with PSG and Paris FC occupying 17th and 15th place in the league respectively. The match lacked intensity, prompting audible dissatisfaction from the crowd at half-time. Just before the hour mark, PSG opened the scoring through Carlos Bianchi, although the goal was contested by Paris FC defenders, who appealed for offside. PSG then appeared content to defend their narrow lead, but Paris FC eventually equalized when Daniel Alberto scored from a corner, left unmarked in the center of the penalty area. PFC was relegated at the end of that campaign, leaving PSG as the capital's sole top-flight club. Consequently, the rivalry remained relatively subdued for decades, marked by infrequent encounters and limited supporter hostility.

=== Diverging fortunes and top-flight return ===
Paris FC spent decades in obscurity, drifting through the lower divisions before re-emerging as Ligue 2 regulars in the 2010s. In 2024, the club was acquired by France's wealthiest family, the Arnaults of luxury empire LVMH, in partnership with Red Bull. Under this new ownership, PFC earned promotion to Ligue 1 in 2025 for the first time in 46 years. PSG, meanwhile, has been bankrolled by Qatar Sports Investments (QSI) since June 2011, becoming one of the richest clubs in the world and claiming a record number of league titles and domestic cups, in addition to winning the UEFA Champions League in 2025. By contrast, PFC has never won a league or cup. Following promotion, PFC moved to the Stade Jean-Bouin, just 20 meters from the Parc des Princes. The proximity makes it the closest professional derby in the world, with the two stadiums separated by a single street.

On 4 January 2026, PSG faced Paris FC at the Parc des Princes in the first top-flight Paris derby since 1990, when Racing had defeated PSG at the same venue 36 years earlier. None of the starters on either side had been born at the time of that match. PSG supporters welcomed Paris FC with a tifo reading "Paris is ours." The match was closely contested, with PSG edging a 2–1 victory. Désiré Doué opened the scoring before Paris FC equalized after half-time through a Willem Geubbels penalty. Parity lasted only two minutes, however, as Ousmane Dembélé scored the decisive goal. The teams met again a week later in the Coupe de France at the same venue, where PSG were eliminated. Former PSG Youth Academy graduate Jonathan Ikoné scored a late winner to secure a 1–0 victory for Paris FC. The defeat marked PSG's first home loss in the competition since 2022 and their first elimination at the round of 32 since 2014.

Paris FC followed up with their first victory over PSG in Ligue 1. The evening began with PSG celebrating their 14th league title during the official Ligue 1 trophy presentation before kick-off at the Stade Jean-Bouin. Bradley Barcola gave the newly crowned champions the lead in the second half, but Paris FC substitute Alimami Gory scored twice in the final 15 minutes to secure victory for the hosts.

== Statistics ==
As of 12 August 2026.

Paris Saint-Germain Paris FC Draw

=== Honours ===
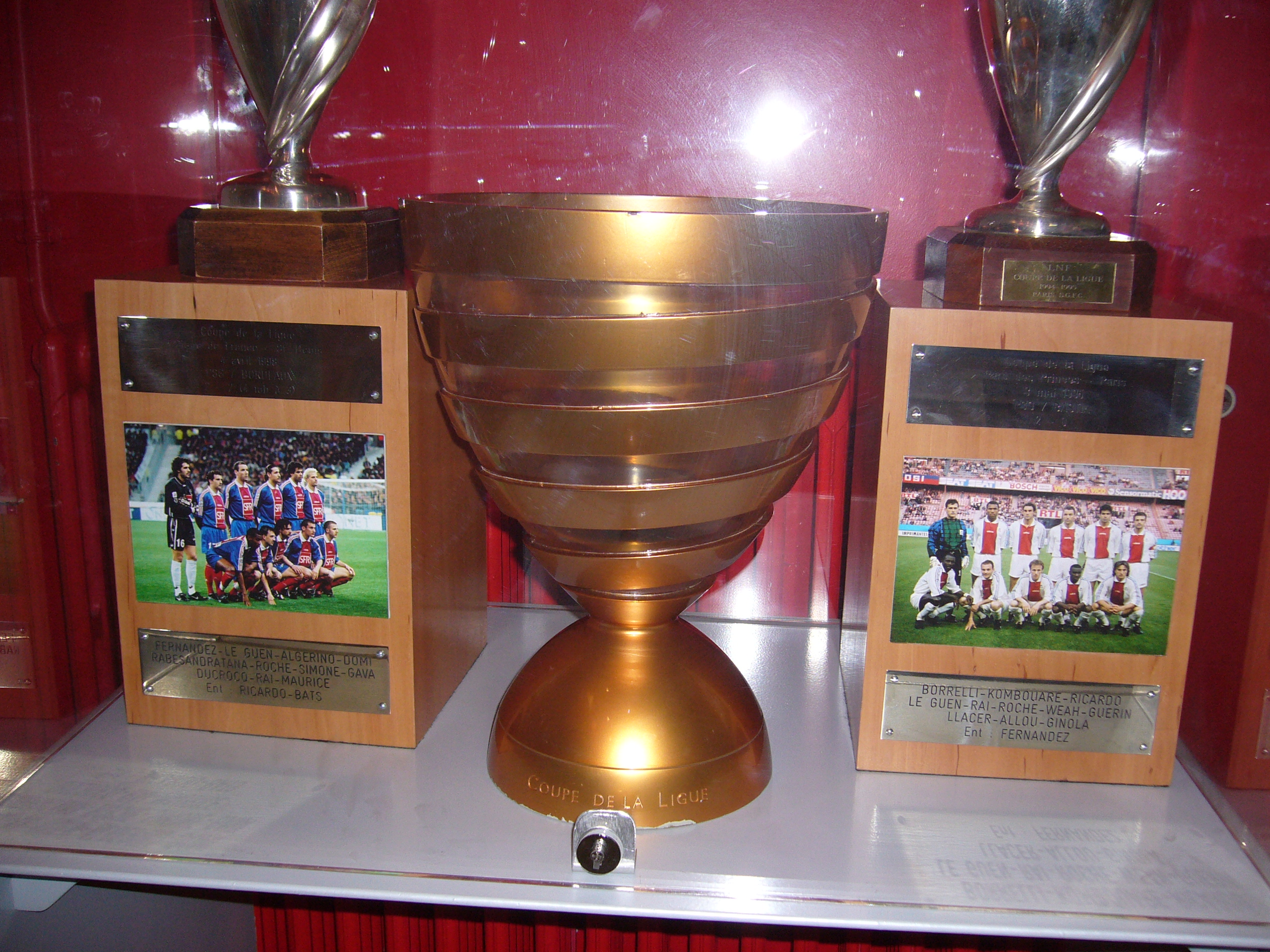
PSG have won the Coupe de la Ligue a record nine times.

Competition	Titles won	
Competition	PSG	PFC
Ligue 1	14	0
Coupe de France	16	0
Coupe de la Ligue	9	0
Trophée des Champions	14	0
Coupe Charles Drago	0	0
National total	53	0
UEFA Champions League	2	0
UEFA Cup Winners' Cup	1	0
UEFA Intertoto Cup	1	0
UEFA Super Cup	2	0
FIFA Intercontinental Cup	1	0
International total	7	0
Overall total	60	0

=== Head-to-head ===
Competition	Matches	Wins		Draws	Goals		Goal difference	
Competition	Matches	PSG	PFC	Draws	PSG	PFC	PSG	PFC
Ligue 1	4	1	1	2	6	6	0	0
Coupe de France	1	0	1	0	0	1	−1	+1
Total	5	1	2	2	6	7	−1	+1

== Matches ==
As of 17 May 2026.

Paris Saint-Germain Paris FC Draw

=== Ligue 1 ===
Ligue 1 matches

18 August 1978 Matchday 6	Paris Saint-Germain	2–2	Paris FC	Paris
	Bianchi 16' (pen.); Renaut 52'	Report	Lech 48'; Zlatarić 59'	Stadium: Parc des Princes; Attendance: 24,274; Referee: Robert Wurtz

17 December 1978 Matchday 24	Paris FC	1–1	Paris Saint-Germain	Paris
	Alberto 88'	Report	Bianchi 56'	Stadium: Parc des Princes; Attendance: 21,996; Referee: Henri Didier

4 January 2026 Matchday 17	Paris Saint-Germain	2–1	Paris FC	Paris
20:45 CET (UTC+1)	Doué 45'; Dembélé 53'	Report	Geubbels 51' (pen.)	Stadium: Parc des Princes; Attendance: 47,892; Referee: Benoît Bastien

17 May 2026 Matchday 34	Paris FC	2–1	Paris Saint-Germain	Paris
21:00	Gory 76', 90+4'	Report	Barcola 50'	Stadium: Stade Jean-Bouin; Attendance: 19,237; Referee: Guillaume Paradis

=== Coupe de France ===
Coupe de France matches

12 January 2026 Round of 32	Paris Saint-Germain	0–1	Paris FC	Paris
21:10 CET (UTC+1)		Report	Ikoné 74'	Stadium: Parc des Princes; Attendance: 47,000; Referee: Ruddy Buquet

== Records ==
As of 17 May 2026.

Paris Saint-Germain Paris FC Draw

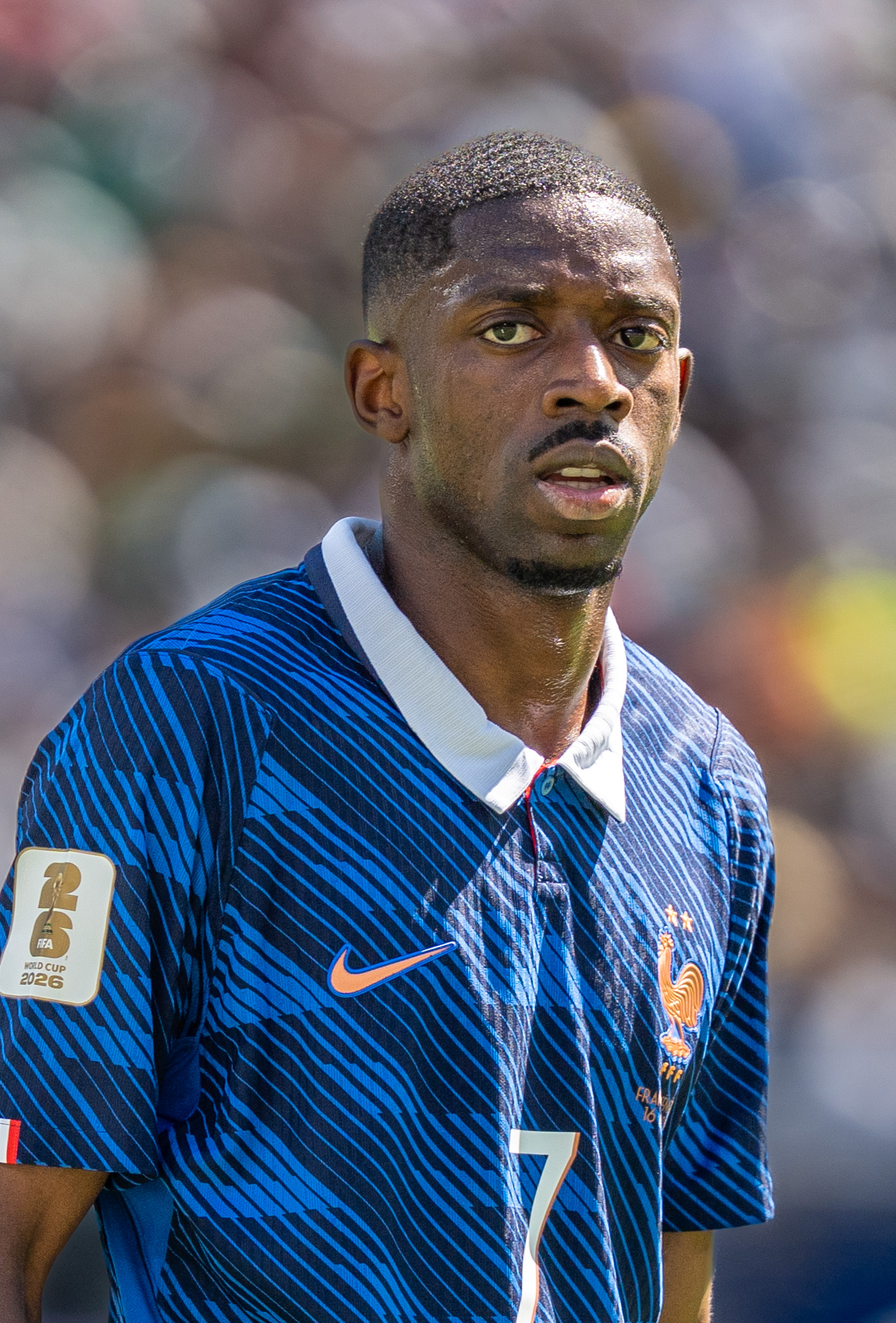
Ousmane Dembélé

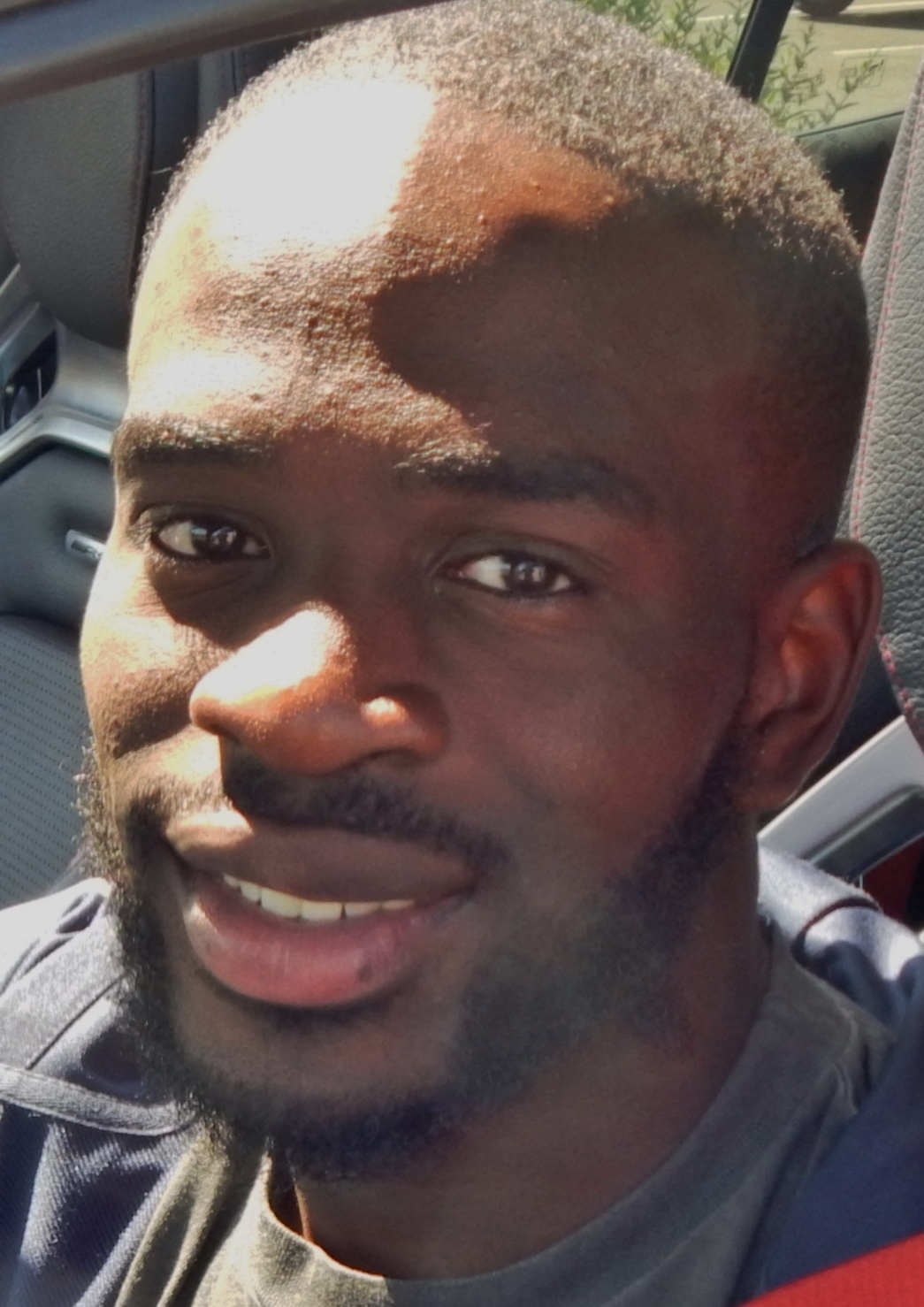
Jonathan Ikoné

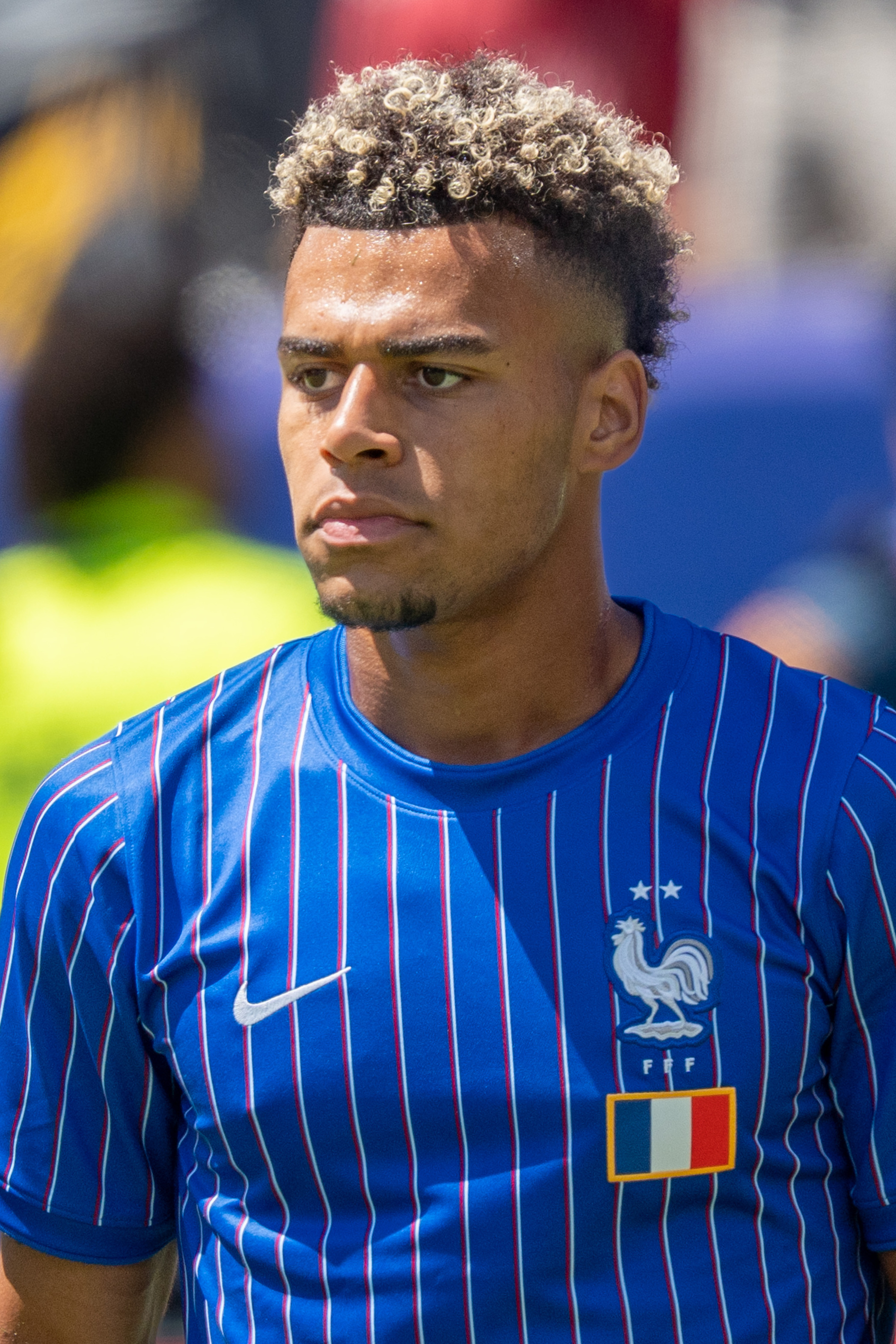
Désiré Doué

=== Most appearances ===
Rank	Player	Position	Club	Period	Apps
1	(France) Alimami Gory	FW	PFC	2022–2026	3
2	(France) Jonathan Ikoné	MF	PFC	2025–	3
3	(France) Willem Geubbels	FW	PFC	2025–2026	3
4	(France) Ousmane Dembélé	FW	PSG	2023–	3
5	(Argentina) Carlos Bianchi	FW	PSG	1977–1979	2
6	(France) Désiré Doué	MF	PSG	2024–	2

=== Top goalscorers ===
Rank	Player	Position	Club	Period	Goals
1	(Argentina) Carlos Bianchi	FW	PSG	1977–1979	2
2	(France) Alimami Gory	FW	PFC	2022–2026	2

=== Biggest wins ===
Date	Competition	Home team	Result	Away team	Margin
4 January 2026	Ligue 1	PSG	2–1	PFC	1 goal
17 May 2026	Ligue 1	PFC	2–1	PSG	1 goal

=== Highest-scoring matches ===
Rank	Date	Competition	Home team	Result	Away team	Goals
1	18 August 1978	Ligue 1	PSG	2–2	PFC	4
2	4 January 2026	Ligue 1	PSG	2–1	PFC	3
3	17 May 2026	Ligue 1	PFC	2–1	PSG	3
4	17 December 1978	Ligue 1	PFC	1–1	PSG	2

=== Longest winning runs ===
Rank	Club	From	To	Wins
1	PFC	12 January 2026	Present	2
2	PSG	4 January 2026	4 January 2026	1

=== Longest unbeaten runs ===
Rank	Club	From	To	Wins	Draws	Matches
1	PSG	18 August 1978	4 January 2026	1	2	3
2	PFC	12 January 2026	Present	2	0	2

=== Highest attendances ===
Home team	Date	Competition	Stadium	Attendance
PSG	4 January 2026	Ligue 1	Parc des Princes	47,892
PFC	17 December 1978	Ligue 1	Parc des Princes	21,996

== Playing for both clubs ==
A total of 37 players have played for both clubs during their careers.

=== List of players ===
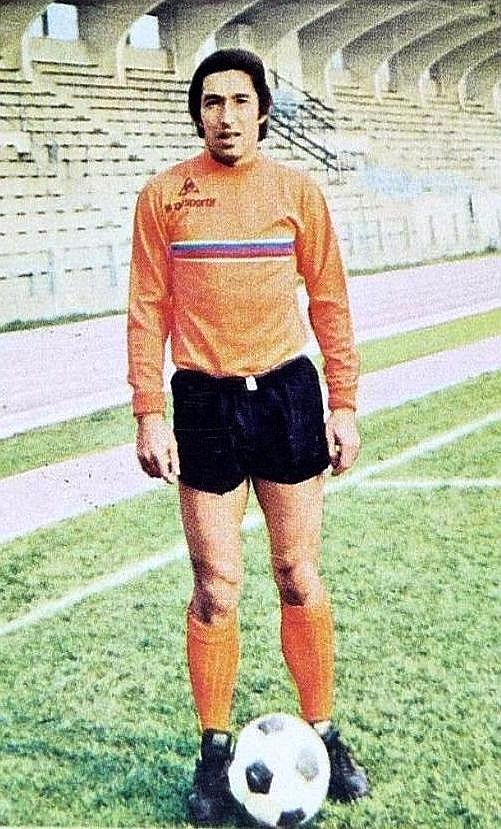
Jean Djorkaeff

No.	Player
1	(France) Jean-Michel Badiane
2	(France) Michel Bensoussan
3	(France) Jean-Claude Bras
4	(Italy) Armando Bianchi
5	(France) Gilles Brisson
6	(France) Bernard Caron
7	(France) Gérard Cenzato
8	(France) Jean-François Charbonnier
9	(Argentina) Omar da Fonseca
10	(France) Guy Delhumeau
11	(France) Jean Djorkaeff
12	(Togo) Othniel Dossevi
13	(France) Bernard Dumot
14	(France) Louis Floch
15	(France) Daniel Guicci

No.	Player
16	(France) Bernard Guignedoux
17	(France) Gérard Hallet
18	(France) Daniel Horlaville
19	(France) Jean-Noël Huck
20	(France) Jonathan Ikoné
21	(France) Philippe Jean
22	(France) Lionel Justier
23	(France) Gérard Lanthier
24	(France) Sylvain Léandri
25	(France) Jean-Louis Leonetti
26	(France) Jérémy Ménez
27	(France) Mario Mongelli
28	(France) Bernard Moraly
29	(France) Fabrice Moreau
30	(France) Michel Prost

No.	Player
31	(Tunisia) Hocine Ragued
32	(France) Jean-Paul Rostagni
33	(France) Daniel Solas
34	(Israel) Mordechai Spiegler
35	(France) Franck Tanasi
36	(France) Alioune Touré
37	(Germany) Kevin Trapp

== Women's derby ==
Both Étoile Sportive de Juvisy-sur-Orge and Paris Saint-Germain FC (women) were founded in 1971, making them among the oldest clubs in French women's football. During the 1990s and 2000s, Juvisy established itself as the dominant Parisian side, regularly competing for national championships alongside OL Lyonnes and benefiting from consistent support from the Essonne departmental council. PSG, in contrast, remained a mid-table club for much of this period, undergoing a squad overhaul in 2005 to promote young talent and restructure the team. Juvisy's sustained strength was highlighted by decisive victories over PSG, illustrating the club's superior resources and squad depth.

PSG gradually closed the gap after 2009, strengthened by key signings and the 2012 takeover by Qatar Sports Investments (QSI), which bolstered the squad and allowed the club to challenge Lyon and assert dominance in the Paris derby (women). Juvisy's absorption into Paris FC (women) in 2017 created a new dynamic, with PFC seeking to compete with the top teams despite initial difficulties. Throughout the 2010s, PSG largely dominated the derby, while Paris FC emerged as a third force in French women's football during the 2020s.
