= Dossevi =

Dossevi is a surname. Notable people with the surname include:

- Damiel Dossevi (born 1983), French pole vaulter
- Matthieu Dossevi (born 1988), French-Togolese footballer
- Othniel Dossevi (born 1947), Togolese footballer
- Pierre-Antoine Dossevi (born 1952), Togolese footballer
- Thomas Dossevi (born 1979), French-Togolese footballer
