= France national football team results (1960–1979) =

- Win Draw Loss

This is a list of the France national football team results from 1960 to 1979.

== 1960s ==
=== 1960 ===
28 February Friendly	Belgium	1 – 0	France	Brussels, Belgium
	Piters 36'	Report		Stadium: Heysel Stadium; Attendance: 56,257; Referee: Gottfried Dienst (Switzerland)

16 March Friendly	France	6 – 0	Chile	Paris, France
	Kaelbel 10'; Vincent 51'; Grillet 57'; Fontaine 78', 80'; Muller 82'	Report		Stadium: Parc des Princes; Attendance: 36,094; Referee: Gérard Versyp (Belgium)

27 March 1960 European Nations'; Cup Quarter-finals	Austria	2 – 4	France	Vienna, Austria
	Nemec 26'; Probst 64'	Report	Marcel 46'; Rahis 59'; Heutte 77'; Kopa 84' (pen.)	Stadium: Prater Stadium; Attendance: 38,000; Referee: Leo Helge (Denmark)

6 July 1960 European Nations'; Cup Semi-finals	France	4 – 5	Yugoslavia	Paris, France
	Vincent 12'; Heutte 43', 62'; Wisnieski 52'	Report	Galić 11'; Žanetić 55'; Knez 75'; Jerković 77', 78'	Stadium: Parc des Princes; Attendance: 26,370; Referee: Gaston Grandain (Belgium)

9 July 1960 European Nations'; Cup Third place play-off	France	0 – 2	Czechoslovakia	Marseilles, France
		Report	Bubník 58'; Pavlovič 88'	Stadium: Stade Vélodrome; Attendance: 9,438; Referee: Cesare Jonni (Italy)

25 September 1962 FIFA World Cup; Qualifying Group 2	Finland	1 – 2	France	Helsinki, Finland
	Pahlman 30' (pen.)	Report	Wisnieski 63'; Ujlaki 83'	Stadium: Olympic Stadium; Attendance: 15,572; Referee: Johannes Malka (West Germany)

28 September Friendly	Poland	2 – 2	France	Warsaw, Poland
	Norkowski 42'; Faber 65'	Report	Guillas 84'; Wisnieski 89'	Stadium: 10th-Anniversary Stadium; Attendance: 55,000; Referee: Zivota Vlajić (Yugoslavia)

12 October Friendly	Switzerland	6 – 2	France	Basel, Switzerland
	Weber 20'; Hügi 40', 61', 65', 80', 88'	Report	Goujon 19', 87'	Stadium: St. Jakob-Park; Attendance: 35,000; Referee: Cesare Jonni (Italy)

30 October Friendly	Sweden	1 – 0	France	Solna, Sweden
	Bieganski 27' (o.g.)	Report		Stadium: Råsunda Stadium; Attendance: 34,070; Referee: Nikolay Latyshev (Soviet Union)

11 December 1962 FIFA World Cup; Qualifying Group 2	France	3 – 0	Bulgaria	Paris, France
	Wisnieski 48'; Marcel 58'; Cossou 80'	Report		Stadium: Colombes; Attendance: 40,690; Referee: Piero Bonetto (Italy)

=== 1961 ===
15 March Friendly	France	1 – 1	Belgium	Paris, France
	Piantoni 3'	Report	Paeschen 58'	Stadium: Parc des Princes; Attendance: 36,072; Referee: Jack Kelly (England)

2 April Friendly	Spain	2 – 0	France	Madrid, Spain
	Gensana 30'; Gento 53'	Report		Stadium: Santiago Bernabéu Stadium; Attendance: 75,000; Referee: Giulio Campanati (Italy)

28 September 1962 FIFA World Cup; Qualifying Group 2	France	5 – 1	Finland	Paris, France
	Faivre 6', 41'; Wisnieski 12'; Piantoni 79'; Schultz 86'	Report	Pahlman 44'	Stadium: Parc des Princes; Attendance: 17,013; Referee: Gottfried Dienst (Switzerland)

18 October Friendly	Belgium	3 – 0	France	Brussels, Belgium
	Hanon 18'; Van Den Berg 60'; Claessen 84'	Report		Stadium: Heysel Stadium; Attendance: 11,019; Referee: Kevin Howley (England)

12 November 1962 FIFA World Cup; Qualifying Group 2	Bulgaria	1 – 0	France	Sofia, Bulgaria
	Iliev 89'	Report		Stadium: Olympic Stadium; Attendance: 55,000; Referee: Stanislav Fencl (Czechoslovakia)

10 December Friendly	France	1 – 1	Spain	Paris, France
	Heutte 13'	Report	Ruiz 59'	Stadium: Colombes; Attendance: 46,496; Referee: Jack Kelly (England)

16 December 1962 FIFA World Cup; Qualifying play-off	Bulgaria	1 – 0	France	Milan, Italy
	Yakimov 47' (o.g.)	Report		Stadium: San Siro; Attendance: 34,740; Referee: Concetto Lo Bello (Italy)

=== 1962 ===
11 April Friendly	France	1 – 3	Poland	Paris, France
	De Bourgoing 24'	Report	Pol 34'; Lentner 44'; Brychczy 77'	Stadium: Parc des Princes; Attendance: 19,698; Referee: Piero Bonetto (Italy)

5 May Friendly	Italy	2 – 1	France	Florence, Italy
	Altafini 47', 51'	Report	Piumi 28'	Stadium: Stadio Comunale; Attendance: 45,000; Referee: Josef Kandlbinder (West Germany)

3 October 1964 European Nations' Cup; Preliminary round	England	1 – 1	France	Sheffield, England
	Flowers 57' (pen.)	Report	Goujon 8'	Stadium: Hillsborough; Attendance: 35,380; Referee: Frede Hansen (Denmark)

24 October Friendly	West Germany	2 – 2	France	Stuttgart, West Germany
	Konietzka 46'; Steinmann 82'	Report	Stako 25'; Goujon 32'	Stadium: Neckarstadion; Attendance: 75,000; Referee: Friedrich Seipelt (Austria)

11 November Friendly	France	2 – 3	Hungary	Paris, France
	Di Nallo 18', 75'	Report	Tichy 12'; Rákosi 36'; Göröcs 80'	Stadium: Colombes; Attendance: 35,136; Referee: Juan Gardeazábal (Spain)

=== 1963 ===
9 January Friendly	Spain	0 – 0	France	Barcelona, Spain
		Report		Stadium: Camp Nou; Attendance: 72,000; Referee: Jozef Casteleyn (Belgium)

27 February 1964 European Nations' Cup; Preliminary round	France	5 – 2	England	Paris, France
	Wisnieski 3', 75'; Douis 32'; Cossou 43', 82'	Report	Smith 57'; Tambling 74'	Stadium: Parc des Princes; Attendance: 23,986; Referee: Josef Kandlbinder (West Germany)

17 April Friendly	Netherlands	1 – 0	France	Rotterdam, Netherlands
	Groot 73'	Report		Stadium: De Kuip; Attendance: 41,000; Referee: Johannes Malka (West Germany)

28 April Friendly	France	2 – 3	Brazil	Paris, France
	Wisnieski 70'; Di Nallo 82'	Report	Pelé 30', 76' (pen.), 84'	Stadium: Colombes; Attendance: 50,000; Referee: Concetto Lo Bello (Italy)

29 September 1964 European Nations' Cup; First round	Bulgaria	1 – 0	France	Sofia, Bulgaria
	Diev 24'	Report		Stadium: Vasil Levski National Stadium; Attendance: 50,000; Referee: Frauk Talu (Turkey)

26 October 1964 European Nations' Cup; First round	France	3 – 1	Bulgaria	Paris, France
	Goujon 44', 81'; Herbin 78'	Report	Yakimov 75'	Stadium: Parc des Princes; Attendance: 32,223; Referee: José María Ortiz de Mendíbil (Spain)

11 November Friendly	France	2 – 2	Switzerland	Paris, France
	Buron 18'; Lech 31'	Report	Artelesa 51' (o.g.); Bosson 75'	Stadium: Parc des Princes; Attendance: 27,350; Referee: Arthur Holland (England)

25 December Friendly	France	1 – 2	Belgium	Paris, France
	Masnaghetti 33'	Report	Van Himst 26', 37'	Stadium: Parc des Princes; Attendance: 12,649; Referee: Josef Stoll (Austria)

=== 1964 ===
25 April 1964 European Nations' Cup; Quarter-finals	France	1 – 3	Hungary	Paris, France
	Cossou 73'	Report	Albert 15'; Tichy 16', 70'	Stadium: Colombes; Attendance: 35,274; Referee: Cesare Jonni (Italy)

23 May 1964 European Nations' Cup; Quarter-finals	Hungary	2 – 1	France	Budapest, Hungary
	Sipos 25'; Bene 55'	Report	Combin 2'	Stadium: Népstadion; Attendance: 80,000; Referee: Concetto Lo Bello (Italy)

4 October 1966 FIFA World Cup; Qualifying Group 3	Luxembourg	0 – 2	France	Luxembourg City, Luxembourg
		Report	Guy 19'; Artelesa 80'	Stadium: Stade Municipale; Attendance: 17,536; Referee: Vital Loraux (Belgium)

11 November 1966 FIFA World Cup; Qualifying Group 3	France	1 – 0	Norway	Paris, France
	Rambert 17'	Report		Stadium: Parc des Princes; Attendance: 33,517; Referee: John Adair (Northern Ireland)

2 December Friendly	Belgium	3 – 0	France	Brussels, Belgium
	Van Himst 16'; Vermeyen 76', 87'	Report		Stadium: Heysel Stadium; Attendance: 5,927; Referee: Rudolf Kreitlein (West Germany)

=== 1965 ===
24 March Friendly	France	1 – 2	Austria	Paris, France
	Hausser 28'	Report	Seitl 15'; Koller 44'	Stadium: Parc des Princes; Attendance: 24,206; Referee: Franz Geluck (Belgium)

18 April 1966 FIFA World Cup; Qualifying Group 3	Yugoslavia	1 – 0	France	Belgrade, Yugoslavia
	Galić 59'	Report		Stadium: Red Star Stadium; Attendance: 23,906; Referee: Dimitrios Vlachoyannis (Greece)

3 June Friendly	France	0 – 0	Argentina	Paris, France
		Report		Stadium: Parc des Princes; Attendance: 11,931; Referee: Jack Taylor (England)

15 September 1966 FIFA World Cup; Qualifying Group 3	Norway	0 – 1	France	Oslo, Norway
		Report	Combin 22'	Stadium: Ullevaal Stadion; Attendance: 31,234; Referee: Hugh Phillips (Scotland)

9 October 1966 FIFA World Cup; Qualifying Group 3	France	1 – 0	Yugoslavia	Paris, France
	Gondet 77'	Report		Stadium: Parc des Princes; Attendance: 36,546; Referee: Frede Hansen (Denmark)

6 November 1966 FIFA World Cup; Qualifying Group 3	France	4 – 1	Luxembourg	Marseilles, France
	Gondet 8', 27'; Combin 11', 38'	Report	Pilot 53'	Stadium: Stade Vélodrome; Attendance: 30,080; Referee: Daniel Zariquieguizco (Spain)

=== 1966 ===
19 March Friendly	France	0 – 0	Italy	Paris, France
		Report		Stadium: Parc des Princes; Attendance: 31,795; Referee: Joseph Hannet (Belgium)

20 April Friendly	France	0 – 3	Belgium	Paris, France
		Report	Lambert 20'; Stockman 71'; Thio 90'	Stadium: Parc des Princes; Attendance: 17,000; Referee: Daniel Zariquieguizco (Spain)

5 June Friendly	Soviet Union	3 – 3	France	Moscow, Soviet Union
	Metreveli 26'; Banishevskiy 64'; Chislenko 66'	Report	Blanchet 19'; Gondet 21'; Bonnel 78'	Stadium: Central Lenin Stadium; Attendance: 102,000; Referee: Bertil Lööw (Sweden)

13 July 1966 FIFA World Cup; Group 1	France	1 – 1	Mexico	London, England
	Hausser 61'	Report	Borja 48'	Stadium: Wembley Stadium; Attendance: 69,000; Referee: Menachem Ashkenazi (Israel)

15 July 1966 FIFA World Cup; Group 1	France	1 – 2	Uruguay	London, England
	De Bourgoing 16' (pen.)	Report	Rocha 27'; Cortés 32'	Stadium: White City Stadium; Attendance: 45,000; Referee: Karol Galba (Czechoslovakia)

20 July 1966 FIFA World Cup; Group 1	England	2 – 0	France	London, England
	Hunt 38', 75'	Report		Stadium: Wembley Stadium; Attendance: 98,270; Referee: Arturo Yamasaki (Peru)

28 September Friendly	Hungary	4 – 2	France	Budapest, Hungary
	Farkas 13', 57', 83', 89'	Report	Gondet 26'; Revelli 58'	Stadium: Népstadion; Attendance: 25,000; Referee: Dimitrios Vlachoyannis (Greece)

22 October UEFA Euro 1968; Qualifying Group 7	France	2 – 1	Poland	Paris, France
	Di Nallo 26'; Lech 85'	Report	Grzegorczyk 61'	Stadium: Parc des Princes; Attendance: 23,524; Referee: Gerhard Schulenburg (West Germany)

11 November UEFA Euro 1968; Qualifying Group 7	Belgium	2 – 1	France	Brussels, Belgium
	Van Himst 51', 54'	Report	Lech 67'	Stadium: Heysel Stadium; Attendance: 43,404; Referee: Jack Taylor (England)

26 November UEFA Euro 1968; Qualifying Group 7	Luxembourg	0 – 3	France	Luxembourg City, Luxembourg
		Report	Herbet 8'; Revelli 40'; Lech 41'	Stadium: Stade Municipale; Attendance: 3,000; Referee: Laurens van Ravens (Netherlands)

=== 1967 ===
22 March Friendly	France	1 – 2	Romania	Paris, France
	Dogliani 88'	Report	Frățilă 15'; Dridea 75'	Stadium: Parc des Princes; Attendance: 23,679; Referee: Günther Baumgärtel (West Germany)

3 June Friendly	France	2 – 4	Soviet Union	Paris, France
	Gondet 11'; Simon 45'	Report	Chislenko 33', 59'; Byshovets 47'; Streltsov 80'	Stadium: Parc des Princes; Attendance: 24,778; Referee: Décio Freitas (Portugal)

17 September UEFA Euro 1968; Qualifying Group 7	Poland	1 – 4	France	Warsaw, Poland
	Brychczy 26'	Report	Herbin 13'; Di Nallo 33', 85'; Guy 63'	Stadium: 10th-Anniversary Stadium; Attendance: 70,000; Referee: Ferdinand Marschall (Austria)

27 September Friendly	West Germany	5 – 1	France	West Berlin
	Libuda 28'; Siemensmeyer 47', 58'; Müller 74'; Overath 75'	Report	Bosquier 83'; Péri (red card) 42'	Stadium: Olympic Stadium; Attendance: 80,000; Referee: Fabio Monti (Italy)

28 October UEFA Euro 1968; Qualifying Group 7	France	1 – 1	Belgium	Nantes, France
	Herbin 84'	Report	Claessen 37'	Stadium: Stade Marcel Saupin; Attendance: 14,591; Referee: Francesco Francescon (Italy)

23 December UEFA Euro 1968; Qualifying Group 7	France	3 – 1	Luxembourg	Paris, France
	Loubet 42', 47', 53'	Report	Klein 85'	Stadium: Parc des Princes; Attendance: 7,320; Referee: Aníbal Oliveira (Portugal)

=== 1968 ===
6 April UEFA Euro 1968; Quarter-finals	France	1 – 1	Yugoslavia	Marseilles, France
	Di Nallo 78'	Report	Musemić 66'	Stadium: Stade Vélodrome; Attendance: 35,423; Referee: Erwin Vetter (East Germany)

24 April UEFA Euro 1968; Quarter-finals	Yugoslavia	5 – 1	France	Belgrade, Yugoslavia
	Petković 2', 32'; Musemić 13', 79'; Džajić 14'	Report	Di Nallo 33'	Stadium: Red Star Stadium; Attendance: 35,423; Referee: Paul Schiller (Austria)

25 September Friendly	France	1 – 1	West Germany	Marseilles, France
	Bosquier 72'	Report	Overath 86'	Stadium: Stade Vélodrome; Attendance: 22,355; Referee: José María Ortiz de Mendíbil (Spain)

17 October Friendly	France	1 – 3	Spain	Lyon, France
	Blanchet 22'	Report	Pirri 59'; Ufarte 74'; Aragonés 84'	Stadium: Stade de Gerland; Attendance: 35,000; Referee: Aurelio Angonese (Italy)

6 November 1970 FIFA World Cup; Qualifying Group 5	France	0 – 1	Norway	Strasbourg, France
		Report	Iversen 67'	Stadium: Stade de la Meinau; Attendance: 18,319; Referee: Francesco Francescon (Italy)

=== 1969 ===
12 February Friendly	France	2 – 2	Hungary	Lyon, France
	Revelli 43'; Floch 52'	Report	Albert 17'; Rákosi 65'	Stadium: Stade de Gerland; Attendance: 4,248; Referee: Anton Buchelli (Switzerland)

12 March Friendly	England	5 – 0	France	London, England
	O'Grady 33'; Hurst 48' (pen.), 49', 80' (pen.); Lee 75'	Report		Stadium: Wembley Stadium; Attendance: 85,000; Referee: István Zsolt (Hungary)

30 April Friendly	France	1 – 0	Romania	Paris, France
	Michel 80'	Report		Stadium: Parc des Princes; Attendance: 18,218; Referee: Bruno De Marchi (Italy)

10 September 1970 FIFA World Cup; Qualifying Group 5	Norway	1 – 3	France	Oslo, Norway
	Dybwad-Olsen 90+2'	Report	Revelli 9', 48', 77'	Stadium: Ullevaal Stadion; Attendance: 22,495; Referee: Laurens van Ravens (Netherlands)

15 October 1970 FIFA World Cup; Qualifying Group 5	Sweden	2 – 0	France	Solna, Sweden
	Kindvall 33' (pen.), 65'	Report		Stadium: Råsunda Stadium; Attendance: 48,518; Referee: Rudi Glöckner (East Germany)

1 November 1970 FIFA World Cup; Qualifying Group 5	France	3 – 0	Sweden	Paris, France
	Bras 39', 43'; Djorkaeff 41' (pen.)	Report		Stadium: Parc des Princes; Attendance: 17,916; Referee: David Smith (England)

== 1970s ==
=== 1970 ===
8 April Friendly	France	1 – 1	Bulgaria	Rouen, France
	Michel 38'	Report	Zhekov 28'	Stadium: Stade Robert Diochon; Attendance: 22,000; Referee: Joseph Hannet (Belgium)

28 April Friendly	France	2 – 0	Romania	Reims, France
	Loubet 10'; Djorkaeff 40' (pen.)	Report		Stadium: Stade Auguste Delaune; Attendance: 10,929; Referee: Dittmar Huber (Switzerland)

3 May Friendly	Switzerland	2 – 1	France	Basle, Switzerland
	Blättler 28', 72'	Report	Revelli 79'	Stadium: St. Jakob-Park; Attendance: 24,500; Referee: Paul Schiller (Austria)

5 May Friendly	France	3 – 0	Czechoslovakia	Nice, France
	Gondet 8'; Loubet 13'; Bosquier 42'	Report		Stadium: Stade du Ray; Attendance: 13,418; Referee: Rudolf Scheurer (Switzerland)

7 October Friendly	Austria	1 – 0	France	Vienna, Austria
	Kreuz 49'	Report		Stadium: Prater Stadium; Attendance: 25,000; Referee: Ferdinand Biwersi (West Germany)

11 November UEFA Euro 1972; Qualifying Group 2	France	3 – 1	Norway	Lyon, France
	Floch 30'; Lech 55'; Mézy 63'	Report	Nilsen 79'	Stadium: Stade de Gerland; Attendance: 10,357; Referee: António Ribeiro (Portugal)

15 November Friendly	Belgium	1 – 2	France	Brussels, Belgium
	Van Moer 73'	Report	Molitor 50', 77'; Lemerre (red card) 79'	Stadium: Heysel Stadium; Attendance: 19,937; Referee: Kurt Tschenscher (West Germany)

=== 1971 ===
8 January Friendly	Argentina	3 – 4	France	Buenos Aires, Argentina
	Brindisi 55'; Nicolau 73'; Laraignée 90' (pen.)	Report	Loubet 3'; Djorkaeff 50' (pen.); Lech 64'; Revelli 89'; Novi (red card) 81'	Stadium: La Bombonera; Attendance: 4,500

13 January Friendly	Argentina	2 – 0	France	Mar del Plata, Argentina
	Laraignée 4' (pen.); Madurga 75'	Report		Stadium: Municipal Stadium; Attendance: 18,000; Referee: Arturo Ithurralde (Argentina)

17 March Friendly	Spain	2 – 2	France	Valencia, Spain
	Pirri 61', 62'	Report	Revelli 14', 54'	Stadium: Estadio Luís Casanova; Attendance: 41,000; Referee: Aurelio Angonese (Italy)

24 April UEFA Euro 1972; Qualifying Group 2	Hungary	1 – 1	France	Budapest, Hungary
	Kocsis 70' (pen.)	Report	Revelli 64'	Stadium: Népstadion; Attendance: 45,867; Referee: Joaquim Campos (Portugal)

8 September UEFA Euro 1972; Qualifying Group 2	Norway	1 – 3	France	Oslo, Norway
	Dybwad-Olsen 80'	Report	Vergnes 33'; Loubet 34'; Blanchet 49'	Stadium: Ullevaal Stadion; Attendance: 16,544; Referee: John Paterson (Scotland)

9 October UEFA Euro 1972; Qualifying Group 2	France	0 – 2	Hungary	Paris, France
		Report	Bene 35'; Novi 43' (o.g.)	Stadium: Colombes; Attendance: 21,756; Referee: Gaspar Pintado Viú (Spain)

10 November UEFA Euro 1972; Qualifying Group 2	France	2 – 1	Bulgaria	Nantes, France
	Lech 64'; Loubet 87'	Report	Bonev 54' (pen.)	Stadium: Stade Marcel Saupin; Attendance: 9,405; Referee: Jack Taylor (England)

4 December UEFA Euro 1972; Qualifying Group 2	Bulgaria	2 – 1	France	Sofia, Bulgaria
	Zhekov 47'; Mihaylov 82'	Report	Blanchet 84'	Stadium: Vasil Levski National Stadium; Attendance: 18,000; Referee: Kurt Tschenscher (West Germany)

=== 1972 ===
8 April Friendly	Romania	2 – 0	France	Bucharest, Romania
	Iordănescu 16'; Dinu 56'	Report		Stadium: Stadionul 23 August; Attendance: 30,000

11 June Brazil Independence Cup	France	5–0	CONCACAF	Salvador, Brazil
	Bereta 7'; Revelli 15', 21', 69'; Bulnes 82' (o.g.)	Report		Stadium: Estádio Fonte Nova; Attendance: 21,422; Referee: Kurt Tschenscher (West Germany)

14 June Brazil Independence Cup	France	2 – 0	Africa	Maceió, Brazil
	Blanchet 35'; Floch 83'	Report		Stadium: Estádio Rei Pelé; Attendance: 10,000; Referee: José Faville Neto (Brazil)

18 June Brazil Independence Cup	Colombia	2 – 3	France	Salvador, Brazil
	Piñeros 23' (pen.); Mesa 82'	Report	Loubet 30', 72'; Molitor 33' (pen.)	Stadium: Estádio Fonte Nova; Attendance: 10,000; Referee: Ángel Pazos (Uruguay)

25 June Brazil Independence Cup	Argentina	0 – 0	France	Salvador, Brazil
		Report		Stadium: Estádio Fonte Nova; Attendance: 6,587; Referee: Armando Marques (Brazil)

2 September Friendly	Greece	1 – 3	France	Piraeus, Greece
	Sarafis 85'	Report	Michel 67'; Revelli 86'; Larqué 90'	Stadium: Karaiskakis Stadium; Attendance: 10,000; Referee: Fulvio Pieroni (Italy)

13 October 1974 FIFA World Cup; Qualifying Group 9	France	1 – 0	Soviet Union	Paris, France
	Bereta 60'	Report		Stadium: Parc des Princes; Attendance: 29,746; Referee: Rudolf Scheurer (Switzerland)

15 November 1974 FIFA World Cup; Qualifying Group 9	Republic of Ireland	2 – 1	France	Dublin, Republic of Ireland
	Conroy 27'; Treacy 76'	Report	Larqué 66'	Stadium: Dalymount Park; Attendance: 35,000; Referee: Kaj Rasmussen (Denmark)

=== 1973 ===
3 March Friendly	France	1 – 2	Portugal	Paris, France
	Molitor 36'	Report	Eusébio 38' (pen.), 87'	Stadium: Parc des Princes; Attendance: 45,267; Referee: Franz Geluck (Belgium)

19 May 1974 FIFA World Cup; Qualifying Group 9	France	1 – 1	Republic of Ireland	Paris, France
	Chiesa 78'	Report	Martin 83'	Stadium: Parc des Princes; Attendance: 40,405; Referee: Nicolae Rainea (Romania)

26 May 1974 FIFA World Cup; Qualifying Group 9	Soviet Union	2 – 0	France	Moscow, Soviet Union
	Blokhin 81'; Onyshchenko 84'	Report		Stadium: Central Lenin Stadium; Attendance: 75,000; Referee: Ferdinand Biwersi (West Germany)

8 September Friendly	France	3 – 1	Greece	Paris, France
	Jouve 9'; Berdoll 59'; Chiesa 72'	Report	Aidiniou 66'	Stadium: Parc des Princes; Attendance: 30,237; Referee: Paolo Toselli (Italy)

13 October Friendly	West Germany	2 – 1	France	Gelsenkirchen, West Germany
	Müller 55', 59' (pen.)	Report	Trésor 82'	Stadium: Parkstadion; Attendance: 70,400; Referee: Rudolf Scheurer (Switzerland)

21 November Friendly	France	3 – 0	Denmark	Paris, France
	Bereta 57'; Larsen 78' (o.g.); Revelli 89'	Report		Stadium: Parc des Princes; Attendance: 14,534; Referee: Heinz Aldinger (West Germany)

=== 1974 ===
23 March Friendly	France	1 – 0	Romania	Paris, France
	Bereta 59'	Report		Stadium: Parc des Princes; Attendance: 20,224; Referee: John Homewood (England)

27 April Friendly	Czechoslovakia	3 – 3	France	Prague, Czechoslovakia
	Pivarník 33'; Bičovský 34'; Panenka 86'	Report	Chiesa 7'; Lacombe 28', 72'	Stadium: Stadion Letná; Attendance: 15,000; Referee: Günter Männig (East Germany)

18 May Friendly	France	0 – 1	Argentina	Paris, France
		Report	Kempes 22'	Stadium: Parc des Princes; Attendance: 26,735; Referee: Jan Keizer (Netherlands)

7 September Friendly	Poland	0 – 2	France	Wrocław, Poland
		Report	Coste 37'; Jodar 39'	Stadium: Olympic Stadium; Attendance: 25,000; Referee: Erik Fredriksson (Sweden)

12 October UEFA Euro 1976; Qualifying Group 7	Belgium	2 – 1	France	Brussels, Belgium
	Mertens 12'; Van der Elst 75'	Report	Coste 16'	Stadium: Heysel Stadium; Attendance: 32,108; Referee: Ken Burns (England)

16 November UEFA Euro 1976; Qualifying Group 7	France	2 – 2	East Germany	Paris, France
	Guillou 79'; Gallice 89'	Report	Sparwasser 25'; Kreische 57'	Stadium: Parc des Princes; Attendance: 45,381; Referee: Pablo Sánchez Ibáñez (Spain)

=== 1975 ===
26 March Friendly	France	2 – 0	Hungary	Paris, France
	Michel 56'; Parizon 63'	Report		Stadium: Parc des Princes; Attendance: 25,000; Referee: Klaus Ohmsen (West Germany)

26 April Friendly	France	0 – 2	Portugal	Paris, France
		Report	Nené 21'; Marinho 64'	Stadium: Colombes; Attendance: 24,816; Referee: Hans-Joachim Weyland (West Germany)

25 May UEFA Euro 1976; Qualifying Group 7	Iceland	0 – 0	France	Reykjavík, Iceland
		Report		Stadium: Laugardalsvöllur; Attendance: 10,000; Referee: Malcolm Wright (Northern Ireland)

3 September UEFA Euro 1976; Qualifying Group 7	France	3 – 0	Iceland	Nantes, France
	Guillou 20', 74'; Berdoll 87'	Report		Stadium: Stade Marcel Saupin; Attendance: 20,000; Referee: Albert Victor (Luxembourg)

12 October UEFA Euro 1976; Qualifying Group 7	East Germany	2 – 1	France	Leipzig, East Germany
	Streich 55'; Vogel 77' (pen.)	Report	Bathenay 50'	Stadium: Zentralstadion; Attendance: 30,000; Referee: Erik Fredriksson (Sweden)

15 November UEFA Euro 1976; Qualifying Group 7	France	0 – 0	Belgium	Paris, France
	Larqué (red card) 67'	Report		Stadium: Parc des Princes; Attendance: 35,547; Referee: Bobby Davidson (Scotland)

=== 1976 ===
27 March Friendly	France	2 – 2	Czechoslovakia	Paris, France
	Soler 17'; Platini 73'	Report	Ondruš 78'; Dobiaš 83'	Stadium: Parc des Princes; Attendance: 9,559; Referee: Francis Rion (Belgium)

24 April Friendly	France	2 – 0	Poland	Lens, France
	Pintenat 12'; Revelli 63'	Report		Stadium: Stade Félix-Bollaert; Attendance: 14,490; Referee: Ferdinand Biwersi (West Germany)

22 May Friendly	Hungary	1 – 0	France	Budapest, Hungary
	Fekete 46'	Report		Stadium: Népstadion; Attendance: 8,726; Referee: Franz Wöhrer (Austria)

1 September Friendly	Denmark	1 – 1	France	Copenhagen, Denmark
	Røntved 53'	Report	Platini 89'	Stadium: Idrætsparken; Attendance: 8,726; Referee: Lars-Åke Björck (Sweden)

9 October 1978 FIFA World Cup; Qualifying Group 5	Bulgaria	2 – 2	France	Sofia, Bulgaria
	Bonev 55'; Panov 68'	Report	Platini 37'; Lacombe 40'	Stadium: Vasil Levski National Stadium; Attendance: 45,000; Referee: Ian Foote (Scotland)

17 November 1978 FIFA World Cup; Qualifying Group 5	France	2 – 0	Republic of Ireland	Paris, France
	Platini 47'; Bathenay 88'	Report		Stadium: Parc des Princes; Attendance: 43,437; Referee: Dusan Maksimović (Yugoslavia)

=== 1977 ===
23 February Friendly	France	1 – 0	West Germany	Paris, France
	Rouyer 52'	Report		Stadium: Parc des Princes; Attendance: 43,802; Referee: Pablo Sánchez Ibáñez (Spain)

30 March 1978 FIFA World Cup; Qualifying Group 5	Republic of Ireland	1 – 0	France	Dublin, Republic of Ireland
	Brady 11'	Report		Stadium: Lansdowne Road; Attendance: 45,000; Referee: Erich Linemayr (Austria)

23 April Friendly	Switzerland	0 – 4	France	Geneva, Switzerland
		Report	Platini 31'; Six 73'; Rocheteau 87'; Rouyer 89'	Stadium: Charmilles Stadium; Attendance: 27,600; Referee: Alfred Delcourt (Belgium)

26 June Friendly	Argentina	0 – 0	France	Buenos Aires, Argentina
		Report		Stadium: La Bombonera; Attendance: 27,600; Referee: Edison Pérez (Peru)

30 June Friendly	Brazil	2 – 2	France	Rio de Janeiro, Brazil
	Edinho 30'; Roberto 51'	Report	Six 52'; Trésor 85'	Stadium: Maracanã Stadium; Attendance: 83,535; Referee: Romualdo Arppi Filho (Brazil)

8 October Friendly	France	0 – 0	Soviet Union	Paris, France
		Report		Stadium: Parc des Princes; Attendance: 40,823; Referee: Marcel Van Langenhove (Belgium)

16 November 1978 FIFA World Cup; Qualifying Group 5	France	3 – 1	Bulgaria	Paris, France
	Rocheteau 38'; Platini 63'; Dalger 89'	Report	Tsvetkov 85'	Stadium: Parc des Princes; Attendance: 44,860; Referee: Charles Corver (Netherlands)

=== 1978 ===
8 February Friendly	Italy	2 – 2	France	Naples, Italy
	Graziani 13' (pen.), 22'	Report	Bathenay 50'; Platini 81'	Stadium: Stadio San Paolo; Attendance: 66,158; Referee: Ángel Franco Martínez (Spain)

8 March Friendly	France	2 – 0	Portugal	Paris, France
	Baronchelli 9'; Berdoll 40'	Report		Stadium: Parc des Princes; Attendance: 42,241; Referee: Alexis Ponnet (Belgium)

1 April Friendly	France	1 – 0	Brazil	Paris, France
	Platini 86'	Report		Stadium: Parc des Princes; Attendance: 46,065; Referee: Pat Partridge (England)

11 May Friendly	France	2 – 1	Iran	Toulouse, France
	Gemmrich 14'; Six 70'	Report	Rowshan 47'	Stadium: Stadium Municipal; Attendance: 34,000; Referee: Augusto Lamo Castillo (Spain)

19 May Friendly	France	2 – 0	Tunisia	Villeneuve-d'Ascq, France
	Platini 71'; Dalger 74'	Report		Stadium: Stadium Lille Métropole; Attendance: 35,000; Referee: Charles Corver (Netherlands)

2 June 1978 FIFA World Cup; Group 1	France	1 – 2	Italy	Mar del Plata, Argentina
	Lacombe 1'	Report	Rossi 29'; Zaccarelli 54'	Stadium: Estadio José María Minella; Attendance: 42,373; Referee: Nicolae Rainea (Romania)

6 June 1978 FIFA World Cup; Group 1	Argentina	2 – 1	France	Buenos Aires, Argentina
	Passarella 45' (pen.); Luque 73'	Report	Platini 60'	Stadium: Estadio Monumental; Attendance: 77,216; Referee: Jean Dubach (Switzerland)

10 June 1978 FIFA World Cup; Group 1	France	3 – 1	Hungary	Mar del Plata, Argentina
	Lopez 23'; Berdoll 38'; Rocheteau 42'	Report	Zombori 41'	Stadium: Estadio José María Minella; Attendance: 28,000; Referee: Arnaldo Cézar Coelho (Brazil)

16 November UEFA Euro 1980; Qualifying Group 5	France	2 – 2	Sweden	Paris, France
	Berdoll 72'; Six 85'	Report	Nordgren 54'; Grönhagen 90'	Stadium: Parc des Princes; Attendance: 44,703; Referee: Károly Palotai (Hungary)

7 October UEFA Euro 1980; Qualifying Group 5	Luxembourg	1 – 3	France	Luxembourg City, Luxembourg
	Michaux 74'	Report	Six 15'; Trésor 63'; Gemmrich 80'	Stadium: Stade Municipal; Attendance: 12,000; Referee: Henk Weerink (Netherlands)

8 November Friendly	France	1 – 0	Spain	Paris, France
	Specht 41'	Report		Stadium: Parc des Princes; Attendance: 37,897; Referee: Walter Eschweiler (West Germany)

=== 1979 ===
25 February UEFA Euro 1980; Qualifying Group 5	France	3 – 0	Luxembourg	Paris, France
	Petit 38'; Emon 60'; Larios 78'	Report		Stadium: Parc des Princes; Attendance: 46,988; Referee: Ron Bridges (Wales)

4 April UEFA Euro 1980; Qualifying Group 5	Czechoslovakia	2 – 0	France	Bratislava, Czechoslovakia
	Panenka 68' (pen.); Štambachr 72'	Report		Stadium: Tehelné pole Attendance: 48,138; Referee: Heinz Aldinger (West Germany)

7 May Friendly	United States	0 – 6	France	East Rutherford, United States
		Report	Lacombe 8', 14', 37'; Droege 42' (o.g.); Amisse 61'; Six 73'	Stadium: Giants Stadium; Attendance: 20,591; Referee: Marco Antonio Dorantes Garcia (Mexico)

5 September UEFA Euro 1980; Qualifying Group 5	Sweden	1 – 3	France	Solna, Sweden
	Backe 24'	Report	Lacombe 14'; Platini 54'; Battiston 71'	Stadium: Råsunda Stadium; Attendance: 14,395; Referee: Ángel Franco Martínez (Spain)

10 October Friendly	France	3 – 0	United States	Paris, France
	Platini 5'; Wagner 18'; Amisse 23'; Janvion (red card) 88'	Report		Stadium: Parc des Princes; Attendance: 25,000; Referee: Hendrik van Ettekoven (Netherlands)

17 November UEFA Euro 1980; Qualifying Group 5	France	2 – 1	Czechoslovakia	Paris, France
	Pécout 67'; Rampillon 76'	Report	Kozák 80'	Stadium: Parc des Princes; Attendance: 39,973; Referee: Horst Brummeier (Austria)
