= Peyron =

Peyron is a surname of French origin. Notable individuals with this surname include:

- Alexandre Peyron (1823–1892), French naval minister
- Bruno Peyron (born 1955), French yachtsman who broke the outright round-the-world sailing record in March 2005
- Christian Peyron (1952–2007), French footballer
- Gustaf Oscar Peyron (1828–1915), Swedish military officer and politician
- Henry Peyron (1883–1972), Swedish fencer
- Ika Peyron (1845–1922), Swedish composer and pianist
- Jean-François Pierre Peyron (1744–1814), French neoclassical painter
- Lennart Peyron (1909–1981), Swedish air force general
- Loïck Peyron (born 1959), French yachtsman, younger brother of the yachtsman Bruno Peyron
- Michael Peyron (born 1935), specialist in the field of Berber language, literature and culture
- Michèle Peyron (born 1961), French politician
- Théophile Peyron (1827–1895), French naval doctor, who ran the mental hospital of Saint-Paul-de Mausole in a former monastery just outside Saint Rémy de Provence
