= Buron (disambiguation) =

Buron is a village in Calvados, France.

Buron may also refer to:

== Surname ==
- Antoine Buron (born 1983), French footballer
- Jean-Louis Buron (1934–2005), French footballer, see France national football team results (1960–79)
- Martine Buron (born 1944), French politician, see Members of the European Parliament 1989–94
- Nicole de Buron (1929–2019), French writer
- Robert Buron (1910–1973), French politician

== Given name ==
- Buron Fitts (1895–1973), Californian politician

== Toponyms ==
- Büron, town in Switzerland
- Yronde-et-Buron, town in Auvergne, in France
- Burón, village in province of Castille and León in Spain

== Other ==
- Buron (dwelling), temporary dwelling on the plateaux of Aubrac
