= 1975–76 French Division 1 =

38th season of French Division 1

Division 1
- Season: 1975–76
- Dates: 7 August 1975 – 19 June 1976
- Champions: Saint-Étienne (9th title)
- Relegated: Monaco; Strasbourg; Avignon
- European Cup: Saint-Étienne
- Cup Winners' Cup: Marseille
- UEFA Cup: Nice; Sochaux
- Matches: 380
- Goals: 1,145 (3.01 per match)
- Top goalscorer: Carlos Bianchi (34 goals)

AS Saint-Etienne won Division 1 season 1975/1976 of the French Association Football League with 57 points.

== Participating teams ==
Location of teams in 1975–76 Division 1
- Olympique Avignonnais
- SEC Bastia
- Bordeaux
- RC Lens
- Lille
- Olympique Lyonnais
- Olympique de Marseille
- FC Metz
- AS Monaco
- AS Nancy
- FC Nantes
- OGC Nice
- Nîmes Olympique
- Paris Saint-Germain FC
- Stade de Reims
- AS Saint-Etienne
- FC Sochaux-Montbéliard
- RC Strasbourg
- Troyes AF
- US Valenciennes-Anzin

== League table ==
| Pos | Team | Pld | W | D | L | GF | GA | GD | BP | Pts | Qualification or relegation |
|---|---|---|---|---|---|---|---|---|---|---|---|
| 1 | Saint-Étienne (C) | 38 | 18 | 15 | 5 | 69 | 38 | +31 | 6 | 57 | Qualification to European Cup first round |
| 2 | Nice | 38 | 17 | 13 | 8 | 67 | 40 | +27 | 7 | 54 | Qualification to UEFA Cup first round |
| 3 | Sochaux | 38 | 16 | 14 | 8 | 59 | 50 | +9 | 6 | 52 | Qualification to UEFA Cup first round |
| 4 | Nantes | 38 | 15 | 14 | 9 | 67 | 44 | +23 | 6 | 50 | |
| 5 | Reims | 38 | 17 | 8 | 13 | 67 | 49 | +18 | 5 | 47 | |
| 6 | Metz | 38 | 18 | 4 | 16 | 72 | 62 | +10 | 7 | 47 | |
| 7 | Nancy | 38 | 14 | 10 | 14 | 67 | 59 | +8 | 7 | 45 | |
| 8 | Bastia | 38 | 14 | 13 | 11 | 59 | 53 | +6 | 4 | 45 | |
| 9 | Marseille | 38 | 20 | 1 | 17 | 60 | 60 | 0 | 1 | 42 | Qualification to Cup Winners' Cup first round (Note: Marseille qualified for 1976–77 European Cup Winners' Cup as winners of the 1975–76 Coupe de France.) |
| 10 | Bordeaux | 38 | 15 | 9 | 14 | 59 | 59 | 0 | 1 | 40 | |
| 11 | Nîmes | 38 | 14 | 9 | 15 | 50 | 53 | −3 | 3 | 40 | |
| 12 | Valenciennes | 38 | 13 | 10 | 15 | 44 | 54 | −10 | 4 | 40 | |
| 13 | Lille | 38 | 14 | 8 | 16 | 59 | 73 | −14 | 4 | 40 | |
| 14 | Paris Saint-Germain | 38 | 13 | 11 | 14 | 63 | 60 | +3 | 2 | 39 | |
| 15 | Lens | 38 | 10 | 16 | 12 | 58 | 66 | −8 | 2 | 38 | |
| 16 | Lyon | 38 | 13 | 7 | 18 | 55 | 61 | −6 | 4 | 37 | |
| 17 | Troyes | 38 | 9 | 16 | 13 | 48 | 55 | −7 | 3 | 37 | |
| 18 | Monaco (R) | 38 | 12 | 9 | 17 | 53 | 73 | −20 | 2 | 35 | Relegation to French Division 2 |
| 19 | Strasbourg (R) | 38 | 9 | 11 | 18 | 39 | 56 | −17 | 3 | 32 | Relegation to French Division 2 |
| 20 | Avignon (R) | 38 | 7 | 6 | 25 | 30 | 80 | −50 | 0 | 20 | Relegation to French Division 2 |

Source: Histoire du PSG
Rules for classification: 1) points; 2) goal difference; 3) number of goals scored.
Victory: 2 points, Draw: 1 point, Defeat: 0 points, a bonus of 1 point for winning by three or more goals in a match
(C) Champions; (R) Relegated
Notes:

Promoted from Division 2, who will play in Division 1 season 1976/1977

- Angers SCO: Champion of Division 2, winner of Division 2 group B
- Stade Rennais FC: Runner-up, winner of Division 2 group A
- Stade Lavallois: Third place, winner of barrages

== Results ==
| Home \ Away | OAV | BAS | BOR | RCL | LIL | OL | OM | MET | ASM | NAL | NAN | NIC | NMS | PSG | REI | STE | SOC | RCS | TRO | VAL |
|---|---|---|---|---|---|---|---|---|---|---|---|---|---|---|---|---|---|---|---|---|
| Avignon | | 1–1 | 3–4 | 0–0 | 1–0 | 2–1 | 2–1 | 0–1 | 1–1 | 2–3 | 0–2 | 1–5 | 1–0 | 1–1 | 1–0 | 1–3 | 3–1 | 1–0 | 0–1 | 1–2 |
| Bastia | 2–0 | | 2–1 | 0–0 | 1–1 | 4–1 | 2–3 | 3–2 | 3–0 | 3–0 | 0–1 | 1–1 | 1–1 | 3–0 | 2–0 | 2–2 | 1–1 | 2–1 | 3–1 | 1–1 |
| Bordeaux | 2–1 | 3–0 | | 2–2 | 2–1 | 3–1 | 3–1 | 3–1 | 3–1 | 0–0 | 2–1 | 1–0 | 1–0 | 2–1 | 2–3 | 1–1 | 1–2 | 1–1 | 2–2 | 0–1 |
| Lens | 3–1 | 1–1 | 3–2 | | 2–0 | 3–1 | 2–3 | 4–1 | 3–0 | 4–2 | 3–2 | 2–1 | 1–1 | 3–3 | 1–0 | 1–1 | 1–1 | 1–1 | 1–1 | 0–1 |
| Lille | 4–0 | 2–0 | 3–2 | 4–2 | | 2–1 | 4–3 | 1–1 | 3–3 | 1–2 | 1–0 | 0–3 | 2–1 | 2–1 | 2–2 | 0–0 | 1–1 | 3–0 | 3–0 | 5–1 |
| Lyon | 2–0 | 2–2 | 1–2 | 4–1 | 3–0 | | 2–1 | 2–3 | 4–1 | 1–0 | 3–3 | 1–0 | 1–1 | 2–0 | 1–2 | 0–0 | 1–2 | 2–1 | 2–0 | 1–1 |
| Marseille | 3–1 | 4–3 | 1–0 | 3–2 | 2–0 | 2–0 | | 2–1 | 1–0 | 1–3 | 1–2 | 2–1 | 0–1 | 2–1 | 1–0 | 4–2 | 0–3 | 1–0 | 3–2 | 3–0 |
| Metz | 1–0 | 4–1 | 2–1 | 2–1 | 5–2 | 3–1 | 1–0 | | 4–1 | 4–1 | 3–0 | 2–2 | 4–3 | 1–2 | 2–4 | 1–1 | 3–1 | 5–0 | 0–1 | 3–0 |
| Monaco | 1–0 | 2–0 | 1–1 | 1–1 | 3–4 | 1–0 | 2–1 | 2–0 | | 1–0 | 4–4 | 4–1 | 3–1 | 3–0 | 1–0 | 0–3 | 0–0 | 1–2 | 1–1 | 3–1 |
| Nancy | 6–0 | 0–1 | 3–2 | 3–0 | 5–0 | 1–4 | 4–2 | 0–0 | 3–0 | | 1–1 | 2–0 | 1–1 | 2–4 | 3–1 | 0–0 | 5–1 | 1–1 | 0–0 | 3–3 |
| Nantes | 4–0 | 1–0 | 5–1 | 1–1 | 4–0 | 2–3 | 0–1 | 2–0 | 3–1 | 3–0 | | 1–1 | 1–0 | 1–2 | 4–1 | 3–0 | 2–2 | 2–1 | 2–2 | 2–0 |
| Nice | 2–0 | 1–1 | 2–0 | 5–0 | 2–2 | 1–0 | 2–1 | 4–2 | 4–1 | 2–1 | 2–2 | | 4–0 | 2–1 | 2–1 | 1–1 | 3–0 | 1–0 | 5–2 | 1–0 |
| Nîmes | 1–0 | 3–0 | 1–2 | 2–2 | 5–1 | 2–0 | 0–1 | 3–2 | 3–2 | 2–2 | 0–0 | 2–1 | | 2–1 | 0–3 | 2–0 | 0–2 | 2–1 | 1–1 | 1–0 |
| Paris SG | 6–2 | 1–1 | 2–2 | 4–2 | 2–2 | 2–0 | 2–3 | 3–1 | 1–2 | 1–4 | 2–1 | 0–0 | 2–0 | | 2–3 | 2–1 | 2–3 | 0–0 | 1–0 | 2–0 |
| Reims | 4–1 | 1–2 | 0–0 | 4–0 | 2–0 | 3–2 | 3–1 | 3–2 | 2–2 | 1–1 | 1–0 | 1–0 | 2–0 | 1–1 | | 3–2 | 1–1 | 6–0 | 1–1 | 5–1 |
| Saint-Étienne | 4–0 | 4–2 | 5–2 | 2–0 | 3–1 | 1–1 | 1–0 | 1–0 | 2–2 | 3–0 | 2–2 | 1–1 | 5–2 | 1–1 | 2–1 | | 2–0 | 2–1 | 3–0 | 2–0 |
| Sochaux | 1–1 | 2–2 | 2–0 | 3–2 | 4–1 | 1–0 | 3–0 | 3–2 | 4–0 | 3–0 | 1–1 | 0–0 | 2–1 | 1–4 | 1–0 | 1–1 | | 1–1 | 2–2 | 3–0 |
| Strasbourg | 4–0 | 1–3 | 0–2 | 1–1 | 3–0 | 5–0 | 2–0 | 1–2 | 1–0 | 1–5 | 1–1 | 2–2 | 0–1 | 1–0 | 1–1 | 0–2 | 0–0 | | 2–1 | 1–0 |
| Troyes | 1–1 | 0–2 | 2–0 | 1–1 | 1–0 | 3–4 | 2–2 | 0–1 | 3–1 | 3–0 | 0–0 | 2–2 | 1–1 | 1–1 | 2–1 | 0–1 | 3–0 | 1–1 | | 4–0 |
| Valenciennes | 2–0 | 3–1 | 1–1 | 1–1 | 0–1 | 0–0 | 1–0 | 3–0 | 5–1 | 2–0 | 1–1 | 0–0 | 0–3 | 2–2 | 2–1 | 1–1 | 3–0 | 2–0 | 3–0 | |

Legend: Blue = home team win; Yellow = draw; Red = away team win.

== Top goalscorers ==
| Rank | Player | Club | Goals |
|---|---|---|---|
| 1 | (Argentina) Carlos Bianchi | Reims | 34 |
| 2 | (Argentina) Delio Onnis | Monaco | 29 |
| 3 | (Argentina) Hugo Curioni | Metz | 25 |
| 4 | (France) Michel Platini | Nancy | 22 |
| 5 | (France) Robert Pintenat | Sochaux | 21 |
| 6 | (France) Christian Coste | Lille | 19 |
| 6 | (Argentina) Hector Yazalde | Marseille | 19 |
| 8 | (France) Serge Chiesa | Lyon | 18 |
| 9 | (Luxembourg) Nico Braun | Metz | 16 |
| 9 | (France) Gilles Rampillon | Nantes | 16 |

== Attendances ==
| # | Club | Average |
|---|---|---|
| 1 | Saint-Étienne | 19,469 |
| 2 | Marseille | 17,434 |
| 3 | PSG | 17,269 |
| 4 | Lens | 15,500 |
| 5 | Metz | 14,331 |
| 6 | Nice | 13,907 |
| 7 | Nantes | 13,018 |
| 8 | Reims | 10,460 |
| 9 | LOSC | 10,410 |
| 10 | Olympique lyonnais | 9,800 |
| 11 | Girondins | 9,615 |
| 12 | Nancy | 9,347 |
| 13 | Valenciennes | 9,200 |
| 14 | Troyes | 8,700 |
| 15 | Sochaux | 8,015 |
| 16 | Strasbourg | 7,300 |
| 17 | Nîmes | 6,800 |
| 18 | Bastia | 4,894 |
| 19 | Olympique avignonnais | 4,477 |
| 20 | Monaco | 2,597 |
