= André Travetto =

French footballer (born 1948)

- Travetto with Paris Saint-Germain in 1976

Personal information
- Date of birth: 12 December 1948 (age 77)
- Place of birth: Pau, France
- Height: 1.72 m (5 ft 8 in)
- Position: Defender

Youth career
- SO Caillolais

Senior career*
Years	Team	Apps	(Gls)
1967–1969	Cannes	15	(0)
1969–1971	Aix	53	(0)
1971–1973	Avignon	55	(0)
1973–1975	Bastia	42	(0)
1975–1976	Paris Saint-Germain	7	(0)
1976–1977	Aix		
Total		174+	(0+)
- * Club domestic league appearances and goals

André Travetto (born 12 December 1948) is a French former professional footballer who played as a defender.

== Career ==
Travetto was a youth product of SO Caillolais. He joined Cannes in 1967 and made his played his first minutes as a professional footballer at the club. In 1969, Travetto joined Aix. After two years, he transferred to Avignon.

Travetto played his first season in the Division 1 with Bastia in 1973–74. He made a total of 50 appearances across two seasons for the club before joining Paris Saint-Germain.

On 28 February 1976, Travetto made his PSG debut in a 3–0 Coupe de France win against Lens. He played his final match for the club on 16 June 1976, a 2–1 league loss against Monaco.

== After football ==
Travetto retired after 10 years of playing football in the three highest tiers of France. He later went to live in Corsica.

== Career statistics ==
Appearances and goals by club, season and competition
Club	Season	League			Cup		Total	
Club	Season	Division	Apps	Goals	Apps	Goals	Apps	Goals
Cannes	1967–68	Division 2	6	0	0	0	6	0
Cannes	1968–69	Division 2	9	0	0	0	9	0
Cannes	Total		15	0	0	0	15	0
Aix	1969–70	Division 2	26	0	1	0	27	0
Aix	1970–71	Division 2	27	0	3	0	30	0
Aix	Total		53	0	4	0	57	0
Avignon	1971–72	Division 2	23	0	6	0	29	0
Avignon	1972–73	Division 2	32	0	7	0	39	0
Avignon	Total		55	0	13	0	68	0
Bastia	1973–74	Division 1	13	0	2	0	15	0
Bastia	1974–75	Division 1	29	0	6	0	35	0
Bastia	Total		42	0	8	0	50	0
Paris Saint-Germain	1975–76	Division 1	7	0	2	0	9	0
Career total			174	0	25	0	199	0
