= Dominique Barberat =

French footballer (born 1958)

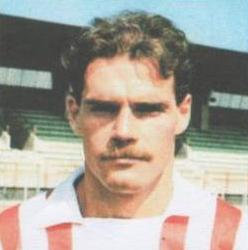
- Barberat at Cannes

Personal information
- Date of birth: 8 October 1958 (age 68)
- Place of birth: Châtenay-Malabry, France
- Height: 1.75 m (5 ft 9 in)
- Positions: Forward; winger; defensive midfielder; full-back

Youth career
- SSV Châtenay-Malabry

Senior career*
Years	Team	Apps	(Gls)
1975–1977	Paris Saint-Germain B		
1976	Paris Saint-Germain	4	(1)
1977–1979	Rouen	31	(2)
1979–1980	Châtellerault		
1980–1983	Quimper	66+ (Note: Statistics for the 1982–83 season are unknown.)	(8+)
1983–1986	Alès	87	(3)
1986–1989	Cannes	77	(2)
1989–1991	Istres	63	(2)
Total		328+	(18+)
- * Club domestic league appearances and goals

Dominique Barberat (born 8 October 1958) is a French former professional footballer. Throughout his career, he played in various positions; he was a forward, winger, defensive midfielder, and full-back.

== Club career ==
Barberat began his career at SSV Châtenay-Malabry. He joined Paris Saint-Germain (PSG) in 1975, initially to play for the reserve side of the club. He would eventually make four Division 1 appearances for the club in the second half of the 1975–76 season, notably scoring one goal against Lyon on 11 May 1976. However, due to conflicts with the PSG manager Velibor Vasović, he returned to the reserves, where he would eventually become top scorer in the 1976–77 season. In 1977, Barberat had to undergo a knee operation. Later that year, he joined newly promoted Division 1 club Rouen after having put in a transfer request.

In 1979, after two seasons at Rouen, the first of which resulted in relegation to the Division 2, Barberat joined Division 3 side Châtellerault. After merely a season there, he joined Quimper, who were playing in the Division 2. In 1983, he joined Alès. His former club PSG notably tried to bring him back to the club during his spell at the club; however, the transfer fell through. Barberat would continue his career at Cannes in 1986, where he would notably score the decisive goal for promotion to the Division 1 in a 2–0 win over Sochaux on 13 June 1987. He joined Istres in 1989, his final club before retiring in 1991.

== International career ==
Barberat was a youth international for France. Due to a knee operation in 1977, he was unable to play at the FIFA World Youth Championship in Tunisia.

== Player profile ==
Across his career, Barberat played in several different positions. Although Pierre Alonzo, former head of the youth academy at PSG, placed him in defense, he began his career as a forward. He had a play style similar to the one of Gerd Müller, according to himself, before being converted to a winger. He initially played on the right, and then on the left afterwards, as he was a good player with both feet. Later, he was converted to a defensive midfielder, where he was able to "start a new career", notably at Alès. Barberat had a "good technical base", according to himself. He also played as a full-back during his career.

== After football ==
After retiring from football, Barberat became a real estate agent. He worked in this job from 1991 to 1998. In 1998, he became a football agent, managing the Grasse-based company SARL B.D. Sports & Consulting. The company is based in France but also operates in England and Italy.
