= Rachid Natouri =

Algerian footballer (1946-2017)

Personal information
- Date of birth: 16 February 1946
- Place of birth: Béjaïa, Algeria
- Date of death: 13 May 2017 (aged 71)
- Height: 1.70 m (5 ft 7 in)
- Position: Right winger

Senior career*
Years	Team	Apps	(Gls)
–1963	JSM Béjaïa		
1963–1965	AC Angoulême		
1965–1966	Marignane	6	(0)
1966–1969	Chaumont	83	(20)
1969–1970	Boulogne	42	(12)
1970–1972	Metz	33	(3)
1972–1973	Troyes	24	(5)
1973–1974	Ajaccio	30	(4)
1974–1976	AS Aix	27	(6)
1976–1980	AAJ Blois	47	(12)

International career
- Algeria
- * Club domestic league appearances and goals

Rachid Natouri (26 February 1946 – 13 May 2017) was an Algerian professional footballer who played as a right winger.

== Honours ==
Troyes

- Ligue 2 runner-up: 1973
