= Léandri =

Léandri or Leandri is a surname. Notable people with the surname include:

- Étienne Léandri (1915–1995), intermediary close to Charles Pasqua
- Jacques Désiré Leandri (1903–1982), French botanist and mycologist
- Sylvain Léandri (born 1948), French footballer

== See also ==
- Leandro (given name)
