= Matthieu Dossevi =

Togolese footballer (born 1988)

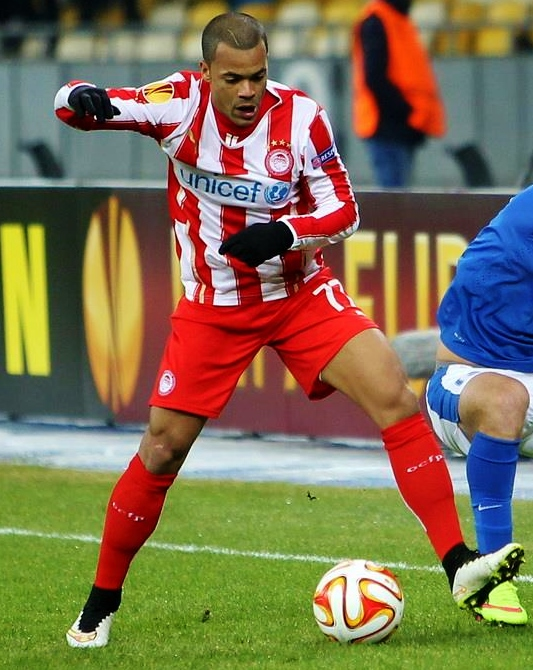
- Dossevi playing for Olympiacos

Personal information
- Full name: Matthieu Cangni Dossevi
- Date of birth: 12 February 1988 (age 38)
- Place of birth: Chambray-les-Tours, France
- Height: 1.72 m (5 ft 8 in)
- Position: Winger

Youth career
- 1995–2005: Tours
- 2005–2008: Le Mans

Senior career*
Years	Team	Apps	(Gls)
2008–2010	Le Mans	44	(6)
2010–2014	Valenciennes	111	(10)
2014–2016	Olympiacos	28	(4)
2015–2016	→ Standard Liège (loan)	23	(5)
2016–2018	Standard Liège	25	(0)
2017–2018	→ Metz (loan)	31	(1)
2018–2020	Toulouse	61	(5)
2020–2021	Denizlispor	18	(0)
2021–2022	Amiens	8	(0)
2022–2023	Versailles	11	(1)

International career^{‡}
2008–2009	France U20	4	(1)
2010–2011	France U21	7	(3)
2014–2020	Togo	33	(5)
- * Club domestic league appearances and goals as of 24 March 2023 ‡ National team caps and goals as of 17 November 2020

Matthieu Cangni Dossevi (born 12 February 1988) is a former professional footballer who played as a winger. Born in France, he played for the Togo national team.

== Career ==
=== Valenciennes ===
Dossevi joined Valenciennes from Le Mans in the summer of 2010 and played 110 times for them, scoring eleven goals for Ligue 1. On 18 March 2014, Dossevi stated that he would leave Valenciennes at the end of the season.

=== Olympiacos ===
In July 2014, Dossevi signed for the Greek champions Olympiakos, for an undisclosed fee.

While former manager Michel had been reluctant to play him regularly, new manager Vítor Pereira used him twice in a row in the starting line-up and Dossevi proved his quality by scoring against both Skoda Xanthi and Panetolikos in the Super League Greece.

==== Standard Liège (loan) ====
On 1 September 2015, he signed a one-year contract with Standard Liège on loan from Olympiakos.

=== Standard Liège ===
In January 2016, Standard Liège exercised its option to sign Dossevi permanently until the summer of 2020, for a transfer fee of €1.3 million.

==== FC Metz (loan) ====
On 31 August 2017, he signed a season-long contract with Ligue 1 club FC Metz on loan from Standard Liège while Metz was given an option to purchase the player at the end of the season, and Metz definitively bought Dossevi on 30 May for a transfer fee of €3 million, even though they were relegated to the French second tier.

=== Toulouse ===
On 3 August 2018, Dossevi signed for Toulouse on a two-year contract, having been the third best passer of the previous season behind Neymar and Florian Thauvin. The transfer fee paid to Standard Liège was reported as €2.5 million. He left the club upon the expiration of his contract and following Toulouse's relegation from Ligue 1 at the end of the 2019–20 season.

=== Amiens ===
On 31 August 2021, he joined Amiens on a one-season deal.

== International career ==
The French-born player has featured for the French under-20 and U-21 national teams, but is now a member of the Togolese national team, for which he was called up to the 2015 Africa Cup of Nations qualifiers.

=== International goals ===
As of match played 12 November 2017

Scores and results list Togo's goal tally first, score column indicates score after each Dossevi goal.

List of international goals scored by Matthieu Dossevi
No.	Date	Venue	Cap	Opponent	Score	Result	Competition
1	27 May 2016	Stade de Kégué, Lomé, Togo	10	Zambia	1–0	1–0	Friendly
2	4 September 2016	Stade de Kégué, Lomé, Togo	12	Djibouti	2–0	5–0	2017 Africa Cup of Nations qualification
3	20 January 2017	Stade d'Oyem, Oyem, Gabon	16	Morocco	1–0	1–3	2017 Africa Cup of Nations
3	31 August 2017	Stade Adrar, Agadir, Morocco	18	Niger	2–0	2–0	Friendly
5	12 November 2017	Stade de Kégué, Lomé, Togo	21	Mauritius	1–0	6–0	Friendly

== Personal life ==
Dossevi and his brother Thomas, a Togolese international footballer, are the sons of Pierre-Antoine Dossevi, who played for Paris Saint-Germain in the 70s. His uncle Othniel, another former PSG footballer, is the father of pole vaulter Damiel Dossevi, who competes for France.

== Honours ==
Olympiacos

- Super League Greece: 2014–15
- Greek Cup: 2014–15

Standard Liège

- Belgian Cup: 2015–16
