= 1968–69 French Division 2 =

30th season of the second-tier football league in France

Division 2
- Season: 1968–69

Statistics of Division 2 in the 1968–69 season.

== Overview ==
It was contested by 21 teams, and Angers won the championship.

== League standings ==
Pos	Team	Pld	W	D	L	GF	GA	GD	BP	Pts	Promotion or relegation
1	Angers	40	29	7	4	128	45	+83	21	86	Promoted
2	Angoulême	40	24	12	4	112	44	+68	16	76	Promoted
3	Nancy	40	19	11	10	67	47	+20	11	60	
4	Limoges	40	20	11	9	67	55	+12	8	59	
5	Toulon	40	19	9	12	65	63	+2	9	56	
6	Aix-en-Provence	40	17	10	13	63	63	0	10	54	
7	Lens	40	15	13	12	73	48	+25	10	53	
8	Stade Reims	40	19	6	15	53	45	+8	9	53	
9	Grenoble	40	15	13	12	64	60	+4	9	52	
10	Gazélec Ajaccio	40	15	8	17	63	62	+1	13	51	
11	Lorient	40	18	8	14	61	61	0	6	50	
12	Avignon	40	15	12	13	56	53	+3	7	49	
13	Lille	40	14	14	12	56	51	+5	6	48	
14	Cannes	40	15	12	13	65	59	+6	5	47	
15	Chaumont	40	13	8	19	70	79	−9	10	44	
16	Dunkerque	40	14	5	21	49	64	−15	6	39	
17	Montpellier	40	12	9	19	42	60	−18	2	35	
18	Béziers	40	11	5	24	48	82	−34	7	34	
19	Paris Joinville	40	8	12	20	41	86	−45	2	30	
20	Besançon	40	4	11	25	53	126	−73	7	26	
21	US Boulogne	40	5	7	28	34	96	−62	3	20	

Source: rsssf.com
