= Gunnar Johansson (footballer) =

Swedish footballer and manager (1924–2003)

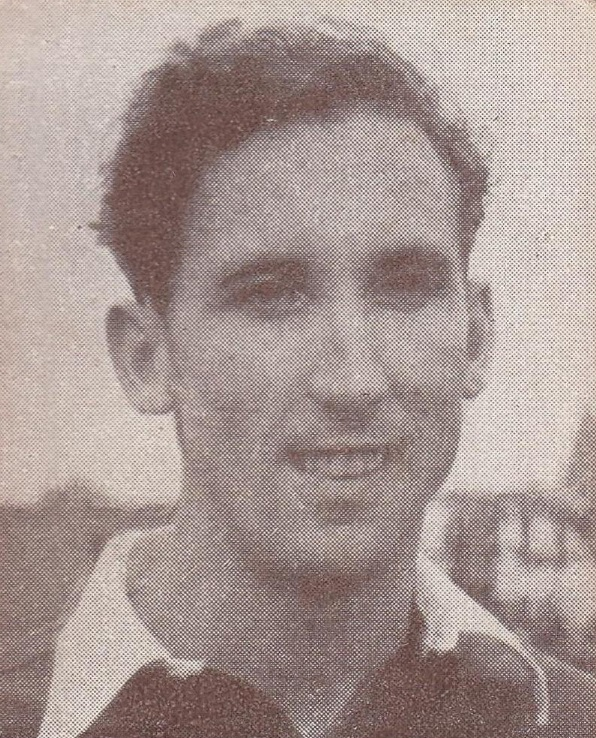
- Johansson in 1949

Personal information
- Full name: Gunnar Johansson
- Date of birth: 29 February 1924
- Place of birth: Hjärtum, Sweden
- Date of death: 14 February 2003 (aged 78)
- Place of death: Aix-en-Provence, France
- Height: 1.82 m (6 ft 0 in)
- Position: Centre-back

Senior career*
Years	Team	Apps	(Gls)
1946–1949	Inlands IF		
1949–1950	GAIS		
1950–1958	Marseille	227	(0)
1958–1961	AS Aix		

International career
1950	Sweden	2	(0)

Managerial career
- 1960–1961: AS Aix
- 1964–1965: Halmstad
Medal record
Representing Sweden
FIFA World Cup
Third place	1950 Brazil
- * Club domestic league appearances and goals

Gunnar Johansson (born 29 February 1924 – 14 February 2003) was a Swedish footballer who played as a centre-back.

He played for the Sweden men's national football team at the 1950 FIFA World Cup before leaving Sweden for Olympique de Marseille where he played with Gunnar Andersson.

== Titles ==
Marseille

- Coupe de France (runner-up): 1954
