= Henri Leonetti =

French footballer (1937–2018)

Personal information
- Date of birth: 6 January 1937
- Place of birth: Marseille, France
- Date of death: 27 February 2018 (aged 81)
- Height: 1.75 m (5 ft 9 in)
- Position: Defender

Senior career*
Years	Team	Apps	(Gls)
1958–1964	Marseille		
1968–1969	La Ciotat		
- * Club domestic league appearances and goals

Henri Leonetti (6 January 1937 – 27 February 2018) was a French footballer who played as a defender.

== Career ==
Born in Marseille, he played for Marseille and La Ciotat.

== Personal life ==
He died on 27 February 2018, aged 81. His brother Jean-Louis was also a footballer.
