= Bernard Lech =

French footballer (born 1946)

Personal information
- Date of birth: 5 October 1946 (age 80)
- Place of birth: Montigny-en-Gohelle, France
- Height: 1.75 m (5 ft 9 in)
- Position: Midfielder

Senior career*
Years	Team	Apps	(Gls)
1963–1968	Lens	112	(29)
1968–1971	Nancy	84	(21)
1971–1975	Reims	125	(25)
1975–1977	Angers	56	(21)
1977–1979	Paris FC	56	(26)
	Amicale de Lucé	1	(0)
- * Club domestic league appearances and goals

Bernard Lech (born 5 October 1946) is a French former professional footballer who played as a midfielder.
