= Jean-Louis Leonetti =

French footballer (1938–2020)

Personal information
- Date of birth: 14 July 1938
- Place of birth: Marseille, France
- Date of death: 2 August 2020 (aged 82)
- Height: 1.73 m (5 ft 8 in)
- Positions: Defender; midfielder

Senior career*
Years	Team	Apps	(Gls)
1955–1960	Marseille		
1960–1961	Nice		
1961–1962	Le Havre	33	(6)
1962–1963	Nice	16	(2)
1963–1965	Rouen	42	(5)
1965–1967	Bordeaux	53	(3)
1967–1968	Aix	30	(7)
1968–1971	Angoulême		
1971–1972	Paris Saint-Germain	36	(3)
1972–1973	Paris FC	2	(0)
1973–1974	Paris Saint-Germain		

Managerial career
- 1974–1977: Paris Saint-Germain B
- 1977–1991: SMUC
- * Club domestic league appearances and goals

Jean-Louis Leonetti (14 July 1938 – 2 August 2020) was a French football player and manager.

== Early and personal life ==
Born in Marseille, his brother Henri was also a footballer.

== Career ==
Leonetti played as a defender and midfielder for Marseille, Nice, Le Havre, Rouen, Bordeaux, Aix, Angoulême, Paris Saint-Germain and Paris FC.

After retiring as a player he managed Paris Saint-Germain B.
