= Francis Piasecki =

French footballer (1951–2018)

Personal information
- Date of birth: 28 July 1951
- Place of birth: Talange, France
- Date of death: 6 March 2018 (aged 66)
- Height: 1.76 m (5 ft 9 in)
- Position: Midfielder

Senior career*
Years	Team	Apps	(Gls)
1970–1971	Metz		
1971	Valenciennes		
1971–1972	Metz	47	(9)
1973–1975	Sochaux		
1975–1977	Paris Saint-Germain		
1977–1986	Strasbourg		

International career
1978–1979	France	3	(0)

Managerial career
- 1985–1986: Strasbourg
- * Club domestic league appearances and goals

Francis Piasecki (28 July 1951 – 6 March 2018) was a French professional footballer who played as a midfielder.
