= 1975–76 Coupe de France =

French football competition

Tournament details
- Country: France

The Coupe de France 1975–76 was its 59th edition. It was won by Olympique de Marseille which defeated Olympique Lyonnais in the Final.

== Round of 16 ==
Team 1	Agg.	Team 2	1st leg	2nd leg
OGC Nice (D1)	2–6	SC Bastia (D1)	2–2	0–4
Lille OSC (D1)	0–6	Olympique Lyonnais (D1)	0–2	0–4
Stade de Reims (D1)	2–4	Olympique de Marseille (D1)	1–1	1–3
US Valenciennes (D1)	4–0	FC Sochaux-Montbéliard (D1)	4–0	0–0
FC Metz (D1)	5–3	USL Dunkerque (D2)	4–1	1–2
Stade Lavallois (D2)	2–4	AS Nancy (D1)	1–3	1–1
Paris SG (D1)	5–2	FC Sète (D2)	3–0	2–2
AS Béziers (D2)	1–6	Angers SCO (D2)	1–4	0–2

== Quarter-finals ==
Team 1	Agg.	Team 2	1st leg	2nd leg
AS Nancy (D1)	3–2	US Valenciennes (D1)	2–0	1–2
SC Bastia (D1)	0–1	FC Metz (D1)	0–1	0–0
Paris SG (D1)	1–3	Olympique Lyonnais (D1)	1–1	0–2
Angers SCO (D2)	1–2	Olympique de Marseille (D1)	1–0	0–2

== Semi-finals ==
29 May 1976

Marseille (1)	4–1	Nancy (1)
Boubacar 10', 73'; Yazalde 63'; Bereta 89'		Platini 60'

Parc des Princes, Paris
Attendance: 38,284
Referee: Georges Konrath

29 May 1976

Lyon (1)	2–0	Metz (1)
Chiesa 72'; Bernad 74'

Stade de la Meinau, Strasbourg
Attendance: 15,796
Referee: René Vigliani

== Final ==
12 June 1976

Marseille	2–0	Lyon
Noguès 67'; Boubacar 84'

Parc des Princes, Paris
Attendance: 45,661
Referee: Robert Wurtz
