= Daniel Alberto =

Argentine footballer (born 1956)

Personal information
- Full name: Daniel Enzo Alberto
- Date of birth: April 10, 1956 (age 70)
- Place of birth: San Martín, Argentina
- Position: Defender

Senior career*
Years	Team	Apps	(Gls)
1976–1978	Independiente	27	(2)
1978–1979	Paris FC	19	(1)
1979–1982	Lens	94	(4)
1982–1986	Rouen	113	(2)
1986–1988	Laval	64	(1)
1988–1989	Nîmes	25	(0)
1989–1990	Tours	22	(0)
- * Club domestic league appearances and goals

Daniel Enzo Alberto (born 10 April 1956) is an Argentine former football defender.
