= Christian Peyron =

French footballer (1952–2007)

Personal information
- Date of birth: 20 March 1952
- Place of birth: Aix-en-Provence, France
- Date of death: 1 April 2007 (aged 55)
- Height: 1.87 m (6 ft 2 in)
- Position: Goalkeeper

Senior career*
Years	Team	Apps	(Gls)
1969–1970	Aix	14	(0)
1970–1980	Nice	57	(0)
1971–1981	Nice B		
- * Club domestic league appearances and goals

Christian Peyron (born 20 March 1952 – 1 April 2007) was a French professional footballer who played as a goalkeeper. He played 57 Division 1 matches for Nice.

== Honours ==
Nice

- Coupe de France runner-up: 1977–78
