= AS Aix-en-Provence =

French football club

- Full name: Association Sportive d'Aix-en-Provence
- Founded: 1941
- Ground: Stade Georges-Carcassonne
- Capacity: 3,700
- Chairman: Sébastien Filippini
- Manager: Nicolas Bardet
- League: Régional 3
- 2024–25: Provence Départemental 1, 1st (promoted)
- Website: https://as-aix.fr/
Home colours	Away colours

Association Sportive d'Aix-en-Provence is a football club based in the city of Aix-en-Provence, France.

== History ==
The team was founded in 1941 as a merger of Football Club Aixois and Union Sportive Aixoise football clubs. Their best result was playing in French Division 1 in the 1967–68 season, where they finished bottom. Four years later they were further relegated to third level. They spent the following four decades playing in lower level amateur levels. In 2014, the club was renamed from AS Aix to Pays d'Aix FC to mark a rupture with the club's complicated past. As of the 2019–20 season, Pays d'Aix played in Provence Départemental 3 in the tenth tier of the French league system. In 2021 they returned to their historical name.

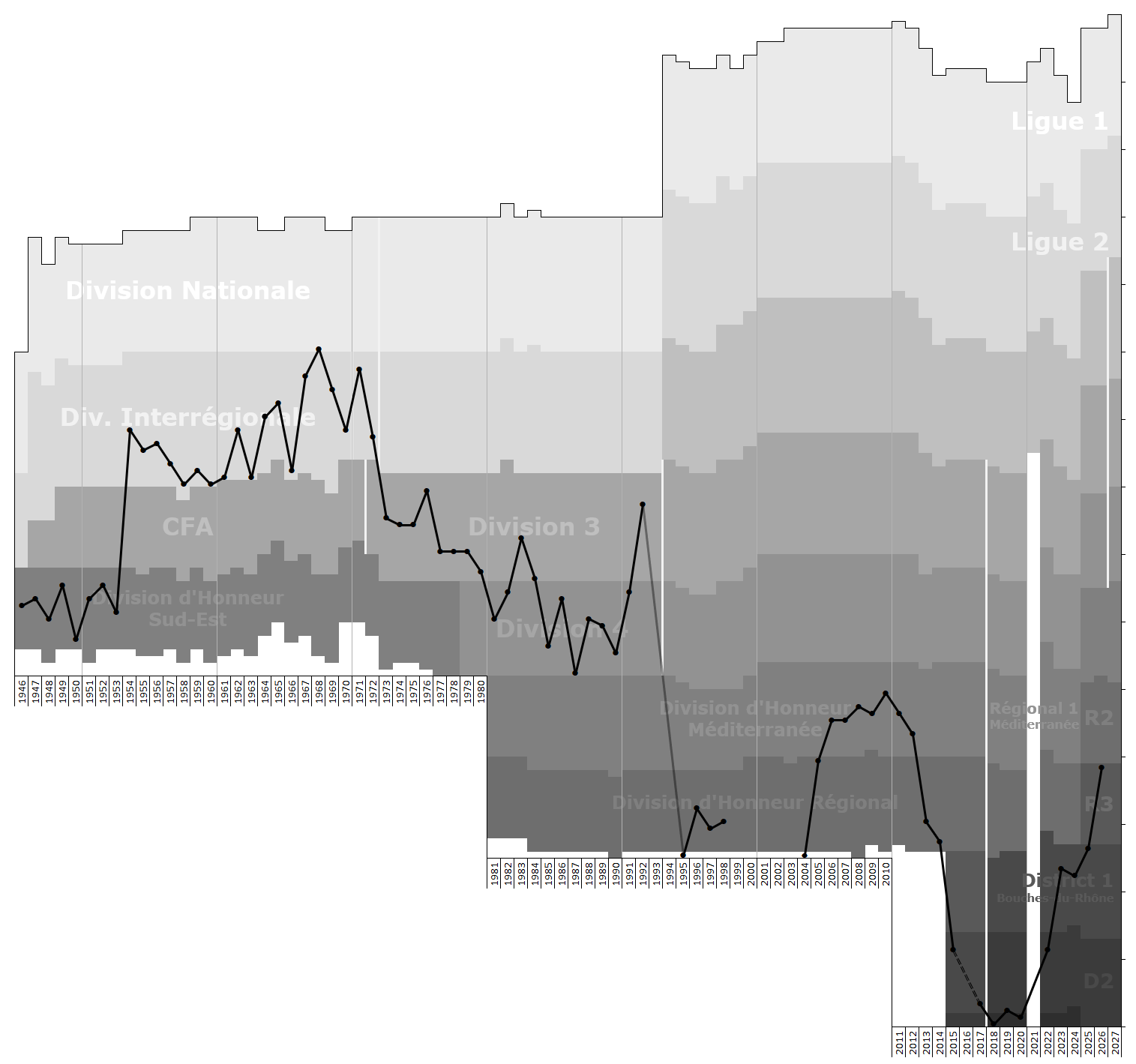
Historical league performance chart of AS Aix-en-Provence

== Recent Championship seasons ==
Season	Group	Games played	Ranking	Points	Won	Draw	Lost	Goals For	Goals Against	Goals Difference
2005–06	Division d'honneur régionale	26	8	57	7	11	8	28	25	+3
2006–07	Division d'honneur régionale	26	9	58	9	5	12	45	42	+3
2007–08	Division d'honneur régionale	26	5	61	10	7	9	36	30	+6
2008–09	Division d'honneur régionale	24	8	53	8	7	9	32	33	−1
2009–10	Division d'honneur régionale	26	5	67	13	2	11	44	35	+9
2010–11	Division d'honneur régionale	26	9	57	9	6	11	39	39	0

== Managerial history ==
- Yvan Beck
- Jules Dewaquez
- Roger Rohlion
- Pierre Danzelle
- Robert Ruocco
- Jean Prouff (1953–1954)
- Henri Roessler (1954–1955)
- Michel Jacques
- Spasoje Nikolić (1959–1960)
- Gunnar Johansson (1960–1961)
- Bela Herczeg (1961–1968)
- René Vernier (1968–1970)
- Dominique Mori (1970–1971)
- Bela Herczeg (1971–1972)
- Paul Lévin (1972–1973)
- Louis Constantino (1973–1974)
- Roland Mitoraj (1974–1976)
- René Vernier (1976–1979)
- Louis Constantino (1979–1980)
- André Moulet (1981–1982)
- Bela Herczeg (1982–1983)
- Jules Zvunka (1983–1984)
- Yannick Bonnec (1985–1986)
- Georges Korac (1990–1992)
- Robert Vecchioni (1999–2001)
- Lekbir Halloum (2004–2007)
- Cyril Granon (2007–2008)
- Daniel Xuereb (2008–2009)
- André Bodji (2009–2011)
- Jean-Luc Reda (2011–2012)
- Lekbir Halloum (2013–2014)
- Thierry Izurieta (2014–2015)
- Karim Zouaoui (2015–2017)
- Nicolas Bardet (2017–2019)
- Julien Greco (2019–2021)

== Notable players ==
- (France) Joseph Alcazar
- (France) Gunnar Andersson
- (France) Jean Baratte
- (France) (Socialist Federal Republic of Yugoslavia) Ivan Bek
- (France) Bruno Bini
- (Argentina) Rubén Bravo
- (Brazil) Caju
- (France) Georges Carnus
- (France) Lucien Cossou
- (France) René Exbrayat
- (France) Raoul Giraudo
- (France) Cyril Granon
- (France) Henri Guérin
- (Denmark) Erik Kuld Jensen
- (Sweden) Gunnar Johansson
- (France) Jean-Louis Leonetti
- (France) Jean Luciano
- (France) Yannick Makota
- (France) Sébastien Maté
- (France) Henri Michel
- (France) Aimé Mignot
- (France) Roland Mitoraj
- (France) Éric Mura
- (Algeria) Rachid Natouri
- (Denmark) Kurt Nielsen
- (France) Robert Péri
- (France) Christian Peyron
- (France) Jean Prouff
- (France) Roger Rolhion
- (France) Jean-Pierre Teisseire
- (France) André Travetto
- (France) Joseph Ujlaki
- (New Caledonia) Joël Wakanumuné
