= Dominique Berthaud =

French football player and manager (born 1952)

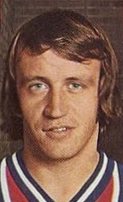
- Berthaud with Paris Saint-Germain in 1976

Personal information
- Date of birth: 12 February 1952 (age 74)
- Place of birth: Bordeaux, France
- Height: 1.86 m (6 ft 1 in)
- Position: Defender

Senior career*
Years	Team	Apps	(Gls)
1969–1975	Évreux		
1975–1976	Paris Saint-Germain	14	(0)
1976–1980	Angoulême	129	(0)
1980–1981	Thonon	33	(0)
1981–1983	Rouen	55	(0)
1983–1985	Quimper	59	(0)
Total		311+	(0+)

Managerial career
- 1985–1989: Rochefort
- 1989–1992: Évreux
- 1992–1996: Rochefort
- 2003–2006: Cognac
- * Club domestic league appearances and goals

Dominique Berthaud (born 12 February 1952) is a French former professional football player and manager.

== After football ==
Later in his life, Berthaud went to live in Port-des-Barques, Charente-Maritime. He would work as a commercial worker there. In his 60s, Berthaud continued to play football for pleasure at ES Port-des-Barques.

== Honours ==
Rouen

- Division 2: 1981–82
