= Lionel Justier =

French footballer (1956–2025)

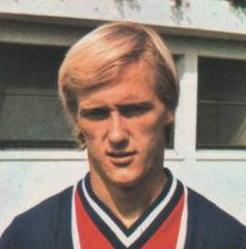
- Justier with Paris Saint-Germain in 1977–78

Personal information
- Full name: Lionel Justier
- Date of birth: 31 August 1956
- Place of birth: Asnières-sur-Seine, France
- Date of death: 12 April 2025 (aged 68)
- Height: 1.82 m (6 ft 0 in)
- Positions: Midfielder; defender

Youth career
- Asnières
- Boulogne-Billancourt
- Meudon
- –1975: Paris Saint-Germain

Senior career*
Years	Team	Apps	(Gls)
1975–1979	Paris Saint-Germain	47	(5)
1978–1979	→ Paris FC (loan)	21	(0)
1979–1982	Brest	87	(4)
1982–1983	Nîmes	21	(0)
1983–1985	Angoulême		
1985–1987	Montceau	66	(4)
1987–1988	Châtellerault	34	(8)
1988–1989	Beauvais	33	(4)
Total		341+	(28+)

International career
- France U21
- France B
- * Club domestic league appearances and goals

Lionel Justier (31 August 1956 – 12 April 2025) was a French professional footballer who played as a midfielder and defender.

== Club career ==
Justier made his debut for Paris Saint-Germain during the 1975–76 season. Along with Thierry Morin, François Brisson, and Jean-Marc Pilorget, he was one of the "four musketeers" of the PSG Academy. Justier was a very versatile player, and he could play in several positions from defender to attacking midfielder. During his career, he would go on to play for Paris FC, Brest, Nîmes, Angoulême, Montceau, Châtellerault, and Beauvais before retiring in 1989. He made 341 appearances and scored 28 goals in the first two tiers of France.

== International career ==
Justier was a U21 international before arriving at Paris Saint-Germain. He was also a B international during his career.

== Personal life and death ==
After Justier retired from professional football, he worked in a transportation company. He also simultaneously played at an amateur level with clubs in Mantes-la-Jolie and in Saint-Ouen-l’Aumône.

Justier died on 12 April 2025, at the age of 68.

== Honours ==
Brest

- Division 2: 1980–81
