= Marc Molitor =

French footballer (born 1949)

Personal information
- Date of birth: 21 September 1948 (age 78)
- Place of birth: Strasbourg, France
- Position: Forward

Senior career*
Years	Team	Apps	(Gls)
1969–1973	Strasbourg	121	(64)
1973–1976	Nice	75	(31)
Total		196	(95)

International career
1970–1975	France	10	(4)
- * Club domestic league appearances and goals

Marc Molitor (born 21 September 1949 in Strasbourg) is a French former professional footballer who played as a forward.
