= Michel Rouquette =

French association football player (born 1950)

Personal information
- Date of birth: 26 August 1950 (age 76)
- Place of birth: France
- Positions: Midfielder; forward

Senior career*
Years	Team	Apps	(Gls)
- RC Épernay Champagne
1973-1974	AS Saint-Étienne	2	(1)
1974-1978	AS Monaco	96	(19)
1978-1980	FC Martigues		
1980-1983	USM Romilly		
- * Club domestic league appearances and goals

Michel Rouquette (born 26 August 1950) is a French retired footballer who last worked as head coach of Al-Gharafa SC in Qatar.

== Career ==
Rouquette started his senior career with RC Épernay Champagne. In 1974, he signed for AS Monaco in the French Ligue 1, where he made one-hundred and thirteen appearances and scored twenty goals. After that, he played for MArtigues and USM Romilly.
