= Pierre-Antoine Dossevi =

Togolese footballer (born 1952)

Personal information
- Date of birth: 17 January 1952
- Place of birth: Lomé, French Togoland
- Height: 1.71 m (5 ft 7 in)
- Position: Right winger

Senior career*
Years	Team	Apps	(Gls)
1974–1975	Tours		
1975–1976	Paris Saint-Germain	2	(1)
1976–1981	Tours	126	(52)
1981–1983	Dunkerque	57	(13)
1983–1984	Bourges		
1984–1985	Tours B		
- * Club domestic league appearances and goals

Pierre-Antoine Dossevi (born 17 January 1952) is a Togolese former professional footballer who played as a right winger.

== Career ==
Dossevi made appearances for Tours, Paris-Saint Germain, USL Dunkerque and Bourges.

After retirement, Dossevi was a member of Tours' professional staff for nine years.

== Personal life ==
Dossevi is the father of Thomas and Matthieu, professional footballers who have played internationally for Togo.
