= Thomas Dossevi =

Togolese footballer (born 1979)

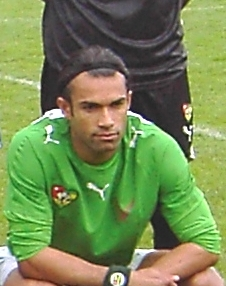
- Dossevi with Togo in 2006

Personal information
- Full name: Thomas Folivi Dossevi
- Date of birth: 6 March 1979 (age 47)
- Place of birth: Chambray-lès-Tours, France
- Height: 1.83 m (6 ft 0 in)
- Positions: Striker; winger

Team information
- Current team: Boulogne (U19 Manager)

Senior career*
| Years | Team | Apps | (Gls) |
| 2000–2001 | ASOA Valence | 26 | (7) |
| 2001–2003 | Châteauroux | 33 | (4) |
| 2003–2005 | Stade Reims | 35 | (8) |
| 2005–2007 | Valenciennes | 51 | (8) |
| 2007–2010 | Nantes | 41 | (9) |
| 2010–2011 | Swindon Town | 27 | (3) |
| 2012 | Chonburi | 10 | (4) |
| 2013–2014 | Valenciennes B | 14 | (0) |
| 2015–2016 | USL Dunkerque | 9 | (0) |
| Total | | 246 | (43) |

International career
| 2002–2012 | Togo | 29 | (2) |

Managerial career
- 2019–: Boulogne (U19)
- * Club domestic league appearances and goals

Thomas Folivi Dossevi (born 6 March 1979) is a former professional footballer who played as a striker and winger. He is the manager of Boulogne's U19 squad. Born in France, he recorded 29 caps and two goals for the Togo national team from 2002 to 2012.

== Club career ==
=== Early career ===
Dossevi was born in Chambray-lès-Tours, France. He spent his early career at ASOA Valence and Châteauroux and Stade Reims.

=== Valenciennes ===
In the summer transfer window, Dossevi joined Valenciennes. Ahead of a new season, L'Équipe reported that Dossevi was on the verge of leaving Valenciennes.

=== Nantes ===
In August 2007, Dossevi joined FC Nantes.

=== Swindon Town ===
Whilst on trial at the club, he scored twice in Swindon Town's 3–2 win over Nottingham Forest on 31 July 2010. He signed a one-year contract at the club for the 2010–11 season on 3 August 2010, with an option of extending this contract by a further 12 months. His first Football League goal for the club came in a 2–2 draw with Hartlepool United on 14 August 2010. He left Swindon by mutual consent on 26 April 2011, having scored 3 goals in 31 appearances.

=== Chonburi ===
Dossevi signed one-year contract with Chonburi on 9 March 2012, the deadline day of Thai Premier League.

=== International career ===
Dossevi was a member of the Togo national team, for which he was called up to the 2006 World Cup.

== Coaching career ==
During his time in USL Dunkerque, Dosevvi also worked as a coach for the club. Retiring in the summer 2016, he became a scout at Standard Liège and worked for the club in two years. On 1 October 2019, Dosevvi was appointed manager of US Boulogne's U19 squad.

== Personal life ==
Thomas is the son of former Togolese professional football player Pierre-Antoine Dossevi. He was one of the surviving witnesses of a bus shooting in Angola during the 2010 Africa Cup of Nations.
