= Louis Floch =

French footballer (born 1947)

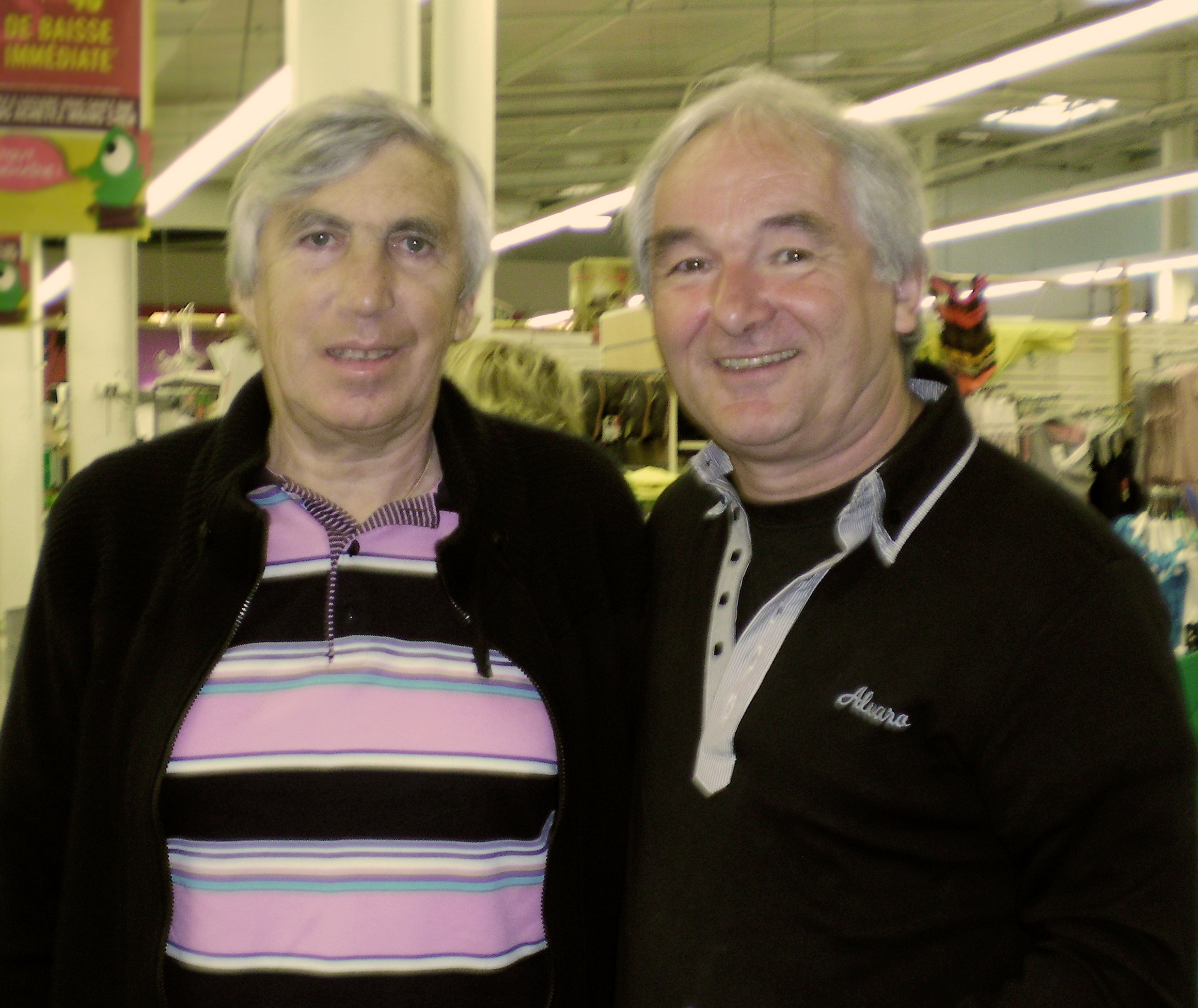
- Floch (left) in 2012

Personal information
- Date of birth: 28 December 1947 (age 78)
- Place of birth: Saint-Pol-de-Léon, Finistère, France
- Height: 1.73 m (5 ft 8 in)
- Position: Forward

Youth career
- –1965: Stade Léonard

Senior career*
Years	Team	Apps	(Gls)
1965–1969	Rennes	93	(19)
1969–1972	Monaco	35	(10)
1972–1974	Paris FC	59	(30)
1974–1976	Paris Saint-Germain	39	(8)
1976–1980	Brest	29	(3)

International career
1970–1973	France	16	(2)
- * Club domestic league appearances and goals

Louis Floch (born 28 December 1947) is a French former professional footballer who played as a forward.

== Honours ==
Monaco

- Division 2 Group South: 1970–71
