= Robert Pintenat =

French footballer (1948–2008)

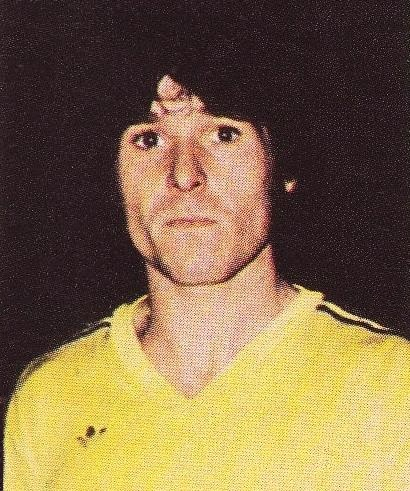
- Pintenat with Sochaux in 1976

Personal information
- Date of birth: 1 May 1948
- Place of birth: Paris, France
- Date of death: 22 August 2008 (aged 60)
- Place of death: Bayonne, France
- Position: Striker

Senior career*
Years	Team	Apps	(Gls)
1969–1970	Rouen		
1970–1973	Red Star		
1973–1974	Nîmes		
1974–1977	Sochaux		
1978–1979	Nancy		
1979–1983	Toulouse		
1983–1984	Olympique Avignonnais		

International career
1976	France	3	(1)

Managerial career
- 1983–1986: Olympique Avignonnais
- 1986–1991: USM Libreville
- 1991–1992: Gabon
- 1994–1995: SR Saint-Dié
- * Club domestic league appearances and goals

Robert Pintenat (1 May 1948 – 22 August 2008) was a French professional footballer who played as a striker. His clubs notably included Sochaux, Nancy and Toulouse. He won three caps for France.

He also had a career in management, including a spell as manager of the Gabon national team.

He died in August 2008 following a long illness.
