= Serge Chiesa =

French footballer (born 1950)

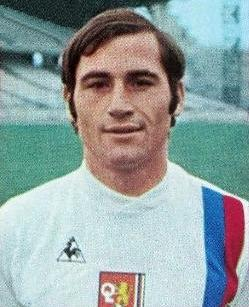
- Chiesa in 1976

Personal information
- Full name: Serge Noël Gilbert Chiesa
- Date of birth: 25 December 1950 (age 75)
- Place of birth: Casablanca, Morocco
- Position: Forward

Youth career
- 1960–1969: AS Montferrand

Senior career*
Years	Team	Apps	(Gls)
1969–1983	Lyon	475	(120)
1983–1985	Orléans	64	(11)
1985–1989	Clermont	92	(13)
Total		631	(124)

International career
1969–1974	France	12	(3)
- * Club domestic league appearances and goals

Serge Noël Gilbert Chiesa (born 25 December 1950) is a former professional footballer who played as a forward. Born in Morocco, he represented France internationally.

Serge Chiesa is regarded as on of Olympique Lyonnais' most notable players of his era. In the 1975 - 1976 season he was named best midfielder by France Football.

== Honours ==
Lyon

- Coupe de France: 1972–73
- Trophée des Champions: 1973
