= 1981–82 Paris Saint-Germain FC season =

12th season of Paris Saint-Germain FC

Paris Saint-Germain
1981–82 season
- President: Francis Borelli
- Manager: Georges Peyroche
- Stadium: Parc des Princes
- Ligue 1: 7th
- Coupe de France: Winners
- Top goalscorer: League: Ivica Šurjak (11); All: Dominique Rocheteau (16)
- Average home league attendance: 24,216
Home colours	Away colours	Third colours

The 1981–82 season was the 12th season in the history of Paris Saint-Germain FC. PSG played their home league matches at the Parc des Princes, attracting an average of 24,216 spectators per match. The club's president was Francis Borelli, and the team was managed by Georges Peyroche, with Dominique Bathenay serving as captain. PSG finished seventh in Ligue 1 and won the Coupe de France. Dominique Rocheteau was the team's top scorer, netting 16 goals in all competitions, including 10 in the league, while Ivica Šurjak was the team's top scorer in the league with 11 goals.

== Players ==
=== Squad ===
Players who featured in at least one official match for the club.

Note: Flags indicate national team as defined under FIFA eligibility rules; some limited exceptions apply. Players may hold more than one non-FIFA nationality.

No.	Pos.	Nation	Player
—	GK	FRA	Dominique Baratelli
—	DF	FRA	Dominique Bathenay (captain)
—	DF	FRA	Éric Renaut
—	DF	FRA	Thierry Morin
—	DF	FRA	Didier Toffolo
—	DF	FRA	Jean-Marc Pilorget
—	DF	FRA	Raymond Domenech
—	DF	FRA	Philippe Col
—	MF	FRA	Jean-Claude Lemoult

No.	Pos.	Nation	Player
—	MF	FRA	Luis Fernandez
—	MF	ALG	Mustapha Dahleb
—	FW	FRA	Alain Préfaci
—	FW	FRA	Dominique Rocheteau
—	FW	YUG	Ivica Šurjak
—	FW	CHA	Nambatingue Toko
—	FW	FRA	Daniel Sanchez
—	FW	SEN	Boubacar Sarr
—	FW	FRA	Michel N'Gom

=== Out on loan ===
Players who were loaned out to other clubs during the season.

Note: Flags indicate national team as defined under FIFA eligibility rules; some limited exceptions apply. Players may hold more than one non-FIFA nationality.

No.	Pos.	Nation	Player
—	DF	FRA	Franck Tanasi (at Orléans)
—	MF	FRA	Gilles Cardinet (at Brest)

No.	Pos.	Nation	Player
—	FW	FRA	Bernard Bureau (at Brest)

== Transfers ==
=== Arrivals ===
Players who signed for the club.

Note: Flags indicate national team as defined under FIFA eligibility rules; some limited exceptions apply. Players may hold more than one non-FIFA nationality.

No.	Pos.	Nation	Player
—	DF	FRA	Raymond Domenech (from Strasbourg)
—	DF	FRA	Franck Tanasi (from Paris FC, end of loan)
—	MF	FRA	Armando Bianchi (from Nîmes, end of loan)
—	FW	FRA	Alain Préfaci (from PSG Youth Academy)

No.	Pos.	Nation	Player
—	FW	FRA	Michel N'Gom (from Marseille)
—	FW	FRA	Daniel Sanchez (from Nice)
—	FW	YUG	Ivica Šurjak (from Hajduk Split)

=== Departures ===
Players who left the club.

Note: Flags indicate national team as defined under FIFA eligibility rules; some limited exceptions apply. Players may hold more than one non-FIFA nationality.

No.	Pos.	Nation	Player
—	DF	FRA	Antoine Garceran (to Gazélec Ajaccio)
—	MF	BRA	Abel Braga (to Cruzeiro)
—	MF	FRA	Armando Bianchi (to Paris FC)

No.	Pos.	Nation	Player
—	MF	FRA	François Brisson (to Lens)
—	MF	FRA	Jean-Noël Huck (to Mulhouse)
—	FW	FRA	Jean-François Beltramini (to Rouen)

== Kits ==
RTL was the shirt sponsor, and Le Coq Sportif was the kit supplier.

Home	Away	Third

== Competitions ==
=== Overview ===
Competition	First match	Last match	Starting round	Final position	Record							
Competition	First match	Last match	Starting round	Final position	Pld	W	D	L	GF	GA	GD	Win %
Ligue 1	24 July 1981	7 May 1982	Matchday 1	7th	38	17	9	12	58	45	+13	44.74
Coupe de France	14 February 1982	15 May 1982	Round of 64	Winners	9	5	3	1	13	6	+7	55.56
Total					47	22	12	13	71	51	+20	46.81

Source: Competitions

=== Ligue 1 ===
==== League table ====
Pos	Team	Pld	W	D	L	GF	GA	GD	Pts	Qualification or relegation
5	Laval	38	16	12	10	49	40	+9	44	
6	Nantes	38	19	5	14	64	34	+30	43	
7	Paris Saint-Germain	38	17	9	12	58	45	+13	43	Qualification to Cup Winners' Cup first round
8	Nancy	38	13	13	12	50	52	−2	39	
9	Brest	38	14	10	14	48	57	−9	38	

Source: Histoire du PSG
Rules for classification: 1) points; 2) goal difference; 3) number of goals scored.
Victory: 2 points, Draw: 1 point, Defeat: 0 points

==== Results by round ====
Round	1	2	3	4	5	6	7	8	9	10	11	12	13	14	15	16	17	18	19	20	21	22	23	24	25	26	27	28	29	30	31	32	33	34	35	36	37	38
Ground	A	H	A	H	A	H	A	A	H	A	H	A	H	A	H	A	H	A	H	A	H	A	H	A	H	H	A	H	A	H	A	H	A	H	A	H	A	H
Result	W	W	D	L	D	W	L	D	L	L	W	D	W	D	W	L	W	L	W	W	W	D	D	L	W	W	W	W	W	L	D	D	L	L	W	L	L	W
Position	3	2	4	5	7	7	9	9	13	14	11	10	9	8	6	8	8	8	8	5	5	5	6	6	5	5	5	5	4	5	4	5	5	6	6	7	7	7

Source: Histoire du PSG
A = Away; H = Home; W = Win; D = Draw; L = Loss

==== Matches ====
24 July 1981 1	Tours	1–2	Paris Saint-Germain	Tours
	Ferrigno 90'	Report	Sarr 69'; Toko 78'	Stadium: Stade de la Vallée du Cher; Attendance: 15,440; Referee: Jean-Claude Boyer

28 July 1981 2	Paris Saint-Germain	2–1	Laval	Paris
	Toko 28'; Šurjak 75'	Report	Krause 57'	Stadium: Parc des Princes; Attendance: 30,132; Referee: Jean-Marie Sculfort

4 August 1981 3	Metz	1–1	Paris Saint-Germain	Metz
	Janković 67'	Report	Toko 57'	Stadium: Stade Saint-Symphorien; Attendance: 12,397; Referee: Marcel Bacou

7 August 1981 4	Paris Saint-Germain	1–2	Monaco	Paris
	Bathenay 66' (pen.)	Report	Edström 31'; Bellone 54'	Stadium: Parc des Princes; Attendance: 37,266; Referee: Michel Girard

11 August 1981 5	Saint-Étienne	0–0	Paris Saint-Germain	Saint-Étienne
		Report		Stadium: Stade Geoffroy-Guichard; Attendance: 23,507; Referee: Daniel Lambert

21 August 1981 6	Paris Saint-Germain	1–0	Sochaux	Paris
	Bathenay 49' (pen.)	Report		Stadium: Parc des Princes; Attendance: 36,348; Referee: Jean-Marie Lartigot

28 August 1981 7	Strasbourg	2–0	Paris Saint-Germain	Strasbourg
	Piasecki 45' (pen.); Jenner 66'	Report		Stadium: Stade de la Meinau; Attendance: 21,412; Referee: Ottorino Di Bernardo

1 September 1981 8	Lens	1–1	Paris Saint-Germain	Lens
	Thordarson 55'	Report	Bathenay 42' (pen.)	Stadium: Stade Bollaert-Delelis; Attendance: 11,130; Referee: Mohamed Benali

12 September 1981 9	Paris Saint-Germain	1–2	Brest	Paris
	N'Gom 67'	Report	Radović 26'; Vabec 47'	Stadium: Parc des Princes; Attendance: 16,374; Referee: Marcel Bacou

22 September 1981 10	Auxerre	1–0	Paris Saint-Germain	Auxerre
	Denis 67'	Report		Stadium: Stade de l'Abbé-Deschamps; Attendance: 7,106; Referee: Georges Konrath

25 September 1981 11	Paris Saint-Germain	2–0	Lyon	Paris
	Šurjak 1'; N'Gom 82'	Report		Stadium: Parc des Princes; Attendance: 23,922; Referee: Claude Bouillet

2 October 1981 12	Nancy	0–0	Paris Saint-Germain	Tomblaine
		Report		Stadium: Stade Marcel Picot; Attendance: 8,000; Referee: Jean-Marie Lartigot

6 October 1981 13	Paris Saint-Germain	4–0	Valenciennes	Paris
	Rocheteau 32'; Sarr 55', 80'; Šurjak 57'	Report		Stadium: Parc des Princes; Attendance: 14,522; Referee: Gérard Biguet

17 October 1981 14	Nice	2–2	Paris Saint-Germain	Nice
	Bravo 30', 85' (pen.)	Report	N'Gom 44'; Fernandez 61'	Stadium: Stade du Ray; Attendance: 5,845; Referee: Michel Vautrot

27 October 1981 15	Paris Saint-Germain	4–0	Nantes	Paris
	Bathenay 6' (pen.); Rocheteau 9', 56'; N'Gom 25'	Report		Stadium: Parc des Princes; Attendance: 44,954; Referee: Alain Delmer

30 October 1981 16	Bordeaux	2–0	Paris Saint-Germain	Bordeaux
	Lacombe 11', 70'	Report		Stadium: Stade Chaban-Delmas; Attendance: 17,302; Referee: Claude Bouillet

7 November 1981 17	Paris Saint-Germain	1–0	Montpellier	Paris
	Šurjak 6'	Report		Stadium: Parc des Princes; Attendance: 15,353; Referee: Georges Konrath

10 November 1981 18	Lille	2–1	Paris Saint-Germain	Lille
	Bocchi 28'; Muslin 75'	Report	Rocheteau 51'	Stadium: Stade Grimonprez-Jooris; Attendance: 14,165; Referee: Daniel Lambert

24 November 1981 19	Paris Saint-Germain	3–1	Bastia	Paris
	Rocheteau 22'; Bathenay 42' (pen.); N'Gom 69'	Report	Tho 16'	Stadium: Parc des Princes; Attendance: 17,762; Referee: Claude Lopez

28 November 1981 20	Laval	0–3	Paris Saint-Germain	Laval
		Report	Izquierdo 40' (o.g.); Toko 64', 69'	Stadium: Stade Francis Le Basser; Attendance: 8,561; Referee: Ottorino Di Bernardo

12 December 1981 21	Paris Saint-Germain	2–0	Metz	Paris
	Bathenay 39' (pen.); Rocheteau 60'	Report		Stadium: Parc des Princes; Attendance: 11,152; Referee: Michel Girard

19 December 1981 22	Monaco	0–0	Paris Saint-Germain	Monaco
		Report		Stadium: Stade Louis II; Attendance: 3,924; Referee: Georges Konrath

16 January 1982 23	Paris Saint-Germain	0–0	Saint-Étienne	Paris
		Report		Stadium: Parc des Princes; Attendance: 46,760; Referee: Alain Delmer

30 January 1982 25	Paris Saint-Germain	2–1	Strasbourg	Paris
	Šurjak 36'; Rocheteau 56'	Report	Piasecki 18'	Stadium: Parc des Princes; Attendance: 19,431; Referee: Daniel Lambert

6 February 1982 26	Paris Saint-Germain	2–1	Lens	Paris
	Domenech 38'; N'Gom 84'	Report	Thordarson 77'	Stadium: Parc des Princes; Attendance: 15,883; Referee: Jacques Ferrary

17 February 1982 24	Sochaux	2–1	Paris Saint-Germain	Montbéliard
	Genghini 83'; Colin 87'	Report	Sarr 53'	Stadium: Stade Auguste-Bonal; Attendance: 6,500; Referee: Georges Konrath

20 February 1982 27	Brest	0–3	Paris Saint-Germain	Brest
		Report	Sanchez 2'; Le Roux 14' (o.g.); Bathenay 55' (pen.)	Stadium: Stade Francis-Le Blé; Attendance: 16,392; Referee: Michel Vautrot

27 February 1982 28	Paris Saint-Germain	2–1	Auxerre	Paris
	Šurjak 62'; Rocheteau 76'	Report	Danio 51'	Stadium: Parc des Princes; Attendance: 23,032; Referee: Ottorino Di Bernardo

3 March 1982 29	Lyon	2–3	Paris Saint-Germain	Lyon
	Emon 2', 66'	Report	Šurjak 3'; Rocheteau 16'; Bathenay 43' (pen.)	Stadium: Stade de Gerland; Attendance: 10,859; Referee: Mohamed Benali

13 March 1982 30	Paris Saint-Germain	1–2	Nancy	Paris
	Šurjak 88' (pen.)	Report	Jeannol 40'; Zénier 60'	Stadium: Parc des Princes; Attendance: 21,074; Referee: Michel Vautrot

20 March 1982 31	Valenciennes	2–2	Paris Saint-Germain	Valenciennes
	Didaux 52'; Orts 85'	Report	N'Gom 12', 48'	Stadium: Stade Nungesser; Attendance: 4,240; Referee: Daniel Lambert

27 March 1982 32	Paris Saint-Germain	1–1	Nice	Paris
	Šurjak 21'	Report	Metsu 28'	Stadium: Parc des Princes; Attendance: 16,725; Referee: Alain Delmer

2 April 1982 33	Nantes	4–0	Paris Saint-Germain	Nantes
	Touré 18', 42'; Muller 37'; Rampillon 74' (pen.)	Report		Stadium: Stade Marcel-Saupin; Attendance: 13,942; Referee: Jacques Ferrary

9 April 1982 34	Paris Saint-Germain	0–2	Bordeaux	Paris
		Report	Gemmrich 29'; Giresse 85'	Stadium: Parc des Princes; Attendance: 41,244; Referee: Mohamed Benali

13 April 1982 35	Montpellier	2–5	Paris Saint-Germain	Montpellier
	Trossero 63'; Baltimore 89'	Report	Sarr 9'; Rocheteau 30'; Lemoult 73'; Šurjak 76'; Renaut 78'	Stadium: Stade de la Mosson; Attendance: 6,485; Referee: Michel Dailly

23 April 1982 36	Paris Saint-Germain	0–1	Lille	Paris
		Report	Verel 85'	Stadium: Parc des Princes; Attendance: 16,163; Referee: Michel Dailly

4 May 1982 37	Bastia	3–1	Paris Saint-Germain	Furiani
	Bathenay 7' (o.g.); Sarr 29' (o.g.); Orlanducci 89' (pen.)	Report	Toko 63'	Stadium: Stade Armand-Cesari; Attendance: 3,500; Referee: Mohamed Benali

7 May 1982 38	Paris Saint-Germain	4–3	Tours	Paris
	Steck 2' (o.g.); N'Gom 16'; Toko 19'; Šurjak 77'	Report	Augustin 56'; Onnis 83', 87'	Stadium: Parc des Princes; Attendance: 12,000; Referee: Jean-Louis Rideau

=== Coupe de France ===
==== Round of 64 ====
14 February 1982 Single leg	Paris Saint-Germain	1–1 (a.e.t.) (4–3 p)	Nîmes	Narbonne
	Rocheteau 51'	Report	Castagnino 44'	Stadium: Parc des Sports et de l'Amitié; Attendance: 5,000; Referee: Michel Girard

==== Round of 32 ====
6 March 1982 First leg	Nœux-les-Mines	0–1	Paris Saint-Germain	Lens
		Report	Sanchez 6'	Stadium: Stade Bollaert-Delelis; Attendance: 24,730; Referee: Claude Bouillet

17 March 1982 Second leg	Paris Saint-Germain	2–0 (3–0 agg.)	Nœux-les-Mines	Paris
	Rocheteau 2', 26'	Report		Stadium: Parc des Princes; Attendance: 13,000; Referee: Michel Dailly

==== Round of 16 ====
30 March 1982 First leg	Marseille	0–1	Paris Saint-Germain	Marseille
		Report	Fernandez 78'	Stadium: Stade Vélodrome; Attendance: 35,095; Referee: Georges Konrath

6 April 1982 Second leg	Paris Saint-Germain	3–1 (4–1 agg.)	Marseille	Paris
	Šurjak 6'; N'Gom 15'; Rocheteau 71'	Report	Santos Muntubile 90'	Stadium: Parc des Princes; Attendance: 18,108; Referee: Ottorino Di Bernardo

==== Quarter-finals ====
16 April 1982 First leg	Paris Saint-Germain	2–0	Bordeaux	Paris
	Bathenay 71' (pen.); Rocheteau 83'	Report		Stadium: Parc des Princes; Attendance: 33,373; Referee: René Lopez

20 April 1982 Second leg	Bordeaux	2–1 (a.e.t.) (2–3 agg.)	Paris Saint-Germain	Bordeaux
	Lacombe 3'; Pantelić 34' (pen.)	Report	Sarr 114'	Stadium: Stade Chaban-Delmas; Attendance: 25,333; Referee: Jacques Ferrary

==== Semi-finals ====
11 May 1982 Single leg	Paris Saint-Germain	0–0 (a.e.t.) (2–1 p)	Tours	Rennes
		Report		Stadium: Roazhon Park; Attendance: 22,350; Referee: Alain Delmer

==== Final ====
15 May 1982 Final	Paris Saint-Germain	2–2 (a.e.t.) (6–5 p)	Saint-Étienne	Paris
	Toko 58'; Rocheteau 120'	Report	Platini 76', 99'	Stadium: Parc des Princes; Attendance: 46,160; Referee: Michel Vautrot
	Penalties
	Bathenay (penalty scored); Renaut (penalty scored); Rocheteau (penalty scored); Šurjak (penalty scored); Fernandez (penalty scored); Pilorget (penalty scored)		(penalty scored) Battiston; (penalty scored) Zanon; (penalty scored) Rep; (penalty scored) Larios; (penalty scored) Platini; (penalty missed) Lopez

== Statistics ==
=== Appearances and goals ===
18 players featured in at least one official match, and the club scored 71 goals in official competitions, including three own goals.

Rank	Player	Position	Appearances	Goals	Source
1	(France) Dominique Baratelli	GK	47	0	
2	(France) Jean-Claude Lemoult	MF	45	1	
3	(France) Luis Fernandez	MF	43	2	
4	(France) Thierry Morin	DF	43	0	
5	(France) Dominique Bathenay	DF	42	9	
6	(Senegal) Boubacar Sarr	FW	41	6	
7	(Socialist Federal Republic of Yugoslavia) Ivica Šurjak	FW	40	12	
8	(Chad) Nambatingue Toko	FW	37	8	
9	(France) Jean-Marc Pilorget	DF	37	0	
10	(France) Michel N'Gom	FW	32	10	
11	(France) Dominique Rocheteau	FW	30	16	
12	(Algeria) Mustapha Dahleb	MF	27	0	
13	(France) Philippe Col	DF	26	0	
14	(France) Daniel Sanchez	FW	22	2	
15	(France) Raymond Domenech	DF	22	1	
16	(France) Éric Renaut	DF	14	1	
17	(France) Didier Toffolo	DF	8	0	
18	(France) Alain Préfaci	FW	4	0	
