= 1982 Coupe de France final =

- Event: 1981–82 Coupe de France
Paris Saint-Germain	Saint-Étienne
2	2
- After extra time Paris Saint-Germain won 6–5 on penalties
- Date: 15 May 1982
- Venue: Parc des Princes, Paris
- Referee: Michel Vautrot
- Attendance: 46,160

The 1982 Coupe de France final was a football match held at Parc des Princes, Paris on 15 May 1982, that saw Paris Saint-Germain FC win their first Coupe de France by defeating AS Saint-Étienne in a penalty shoot out. After normal time and extra-time could not separate the two sides, the match was to be decided on penalty kicks. Christian Lopez missed for AS Saint-Étienne.

== Match details ==
15 May 1982

Paris Saint-Germain	2–2 (a.e.t.)	Saint-Étienne
Toko 58'; Rocheteau 120'		Platini 76', 99'
Penalties
Bathenay (penalty scored); Renaut (penalty scored); Rocheteau (penalty scored); Šurjak (penalty scored); Fernandez (penalty scored); Pilorget (penalty scored)	6–5	(penalty scored) Battiston; (penalty scored) Zanon; (penalty scored) Rep; (penalty scored) Larios; (penalty scored) Platini; (penalty missed) Lopez

Parc des Princes, Paris
Attendance: 46,160
Referee: Michel Vautrot

GK	1	(France) Dominique Baratelli
DF		(France) Philippe Col	(substituted off) 118'
DF	4	(France) Jean-Marc Pilorget
DF	5	(France) Dominique Bathenay (c)
DF		(France) Jean-Claude Lemoult
MF	2	(France) Luis Fernandez
MF		(Algeria) Mustapha Dahleb	(substituted off) 84'
MF	10	(Socialist Federal Republic of Yugoslavia) Ivica Šurjak
FW	7	(Chad) Nambatingue Toko
FW	9	(France) Dominique Rocheteau
FW		(Senegal) Boubacar Sarr
Substitutes:
FW		(France) Michel N'Gom	(substituted on) 84'
DF	13	(France) Éric Renaut	(substituted on) 118'
Manager:
(France) Georges Peyroche Assistant Referees: Fourth Official:

GK	1	(France) Jean Castaneda
DF		(France) Patrick Battiston
DF		(France) Patrice Lestage
DF		(France) Bernard Gardon	(substituted off) 67'
DF	5	(France) Christian Lopez (c)
MF	11	(France) Jean-Louis Zanon
MF		(France) Jean-François Larios
MF		(France) Gérard Janvion
FW	10	(France) Michel Platini
FW		(France) Laurent Paganelli	(substituted off) 67'
FW	9	(Netherlands) Johnny Rep
Substitutes:
MF		(Argentina) Raoul Noguès	(substituted on) 67'
FW		(France) Laurent Roussey	(substituted on) 67'
Manager:
(France) Robert Herbin

== See also ==
- Coupe de France 1981-82
