= List of Paris Saint-Germain FC records and statistics =

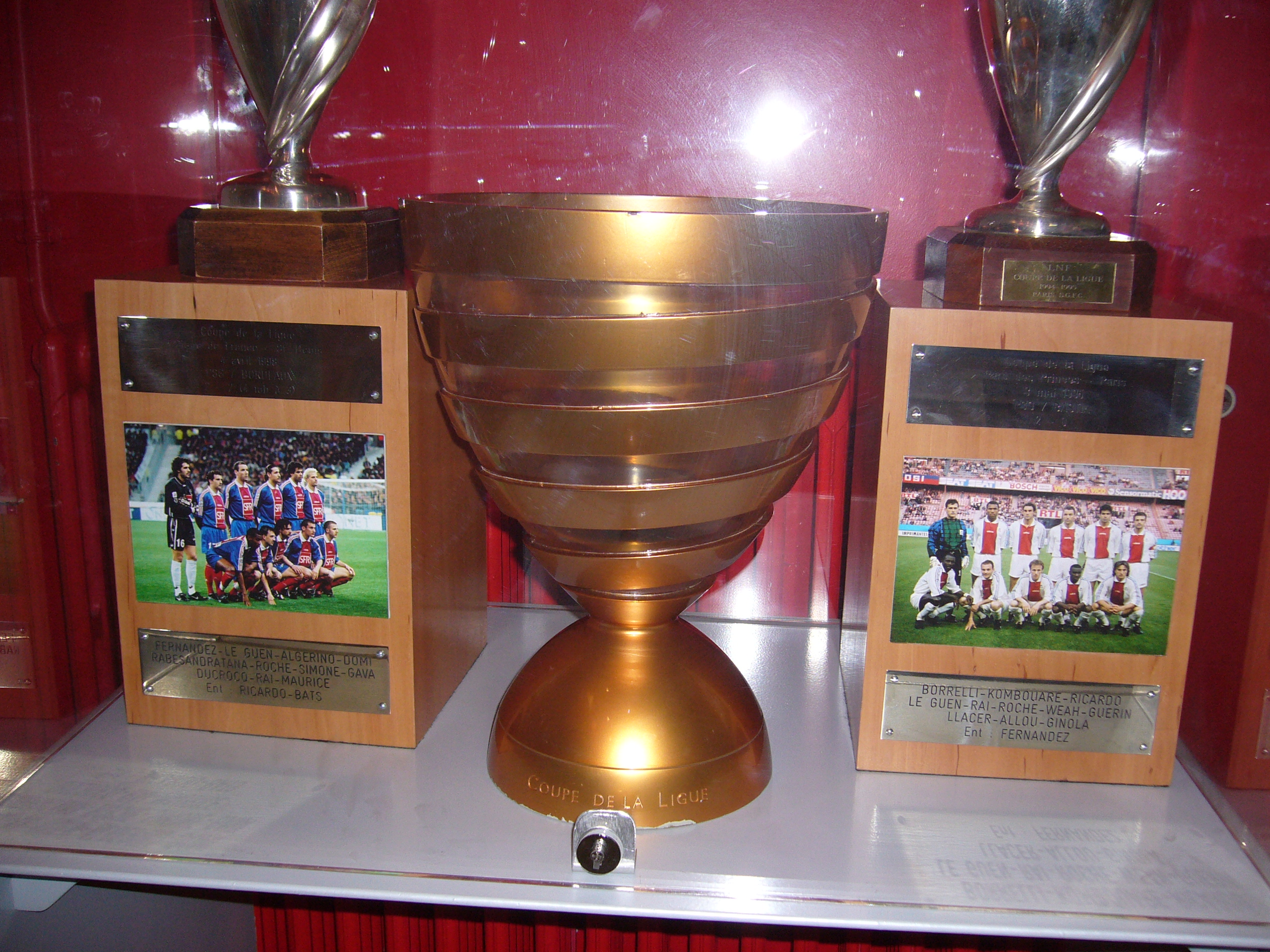
Trophy room in 2008.

Paris Saint-Germain FC hold numerous records, most notably as the most successful French club in history in terms of major official titles, with 60. They hold the record in all domestic competitions, having won 14 Ligue 1 titles, 16 Coupe de France, nine Coupe de la Ligue, and 14 Trophée des Champions. Internationally, PSG have won two UEFA Champions League, two UEFA Super Cup, one UEFA Cup Winners' Cup, one UEFA Intertoto Cup, and one FIFA Intercontinental Cup. Their honours also include one Ligue 2 title, bringing their total number of official titles to 61. They have also secured several unofficial titles, including a record seven Tournoi de Paris, a record two Tournoi Indoor de Paris-Bercy, and two International Champions Cup trophies.

PSG's victory in the 1995–96 UEFA Cup Winners' Cup made them the only French club to win that competition and one of only two French teams to have claimed a major European trophy. By winning the 2024–25 UEFA Champions League, together with the 2024–25 Ligue 1 and the 2024–25 Coupe de France, the club became the first French side to achieve a continental treble. Subsequent victories in the 2025 UEFA Super Cup and the 2025 FIFA Intercontinental Cup made PSG the first French club to win both trophies and delivered the first club world title in the history of French football. Having also won the 2024 Trophée des Champions, PSG completed an unprecedented sextuple, a feat previously achieved only by Barcelona in 2009 and Bayern Munich in 2020.

The Parisians hold the record for the most consecutive seasons in the French top flight, with 51 seasons in Ligue 1 since 1974–75. They are also the only club to have won the Ligue 1 title while leading the table from the first to the final matchday (2022–23), the Coupe de France without conceding a goal (1992–93 and 2016–17), five consecutive Coupe de la Ligue titles (2014–2018), four successive Coupe de France trophies (2015–2018), and eight consecutive Trophée des Champions titles (2013–2020).

Influential figures in the history of PSG include the club's most decorated president Nasser Al-Khelaifi, the most decorated manager Luis Enrique, record appearance holder Marquinhos, all-time top scorer Kylian Mbappé, assist leader Ángel Di María, clean-sheet record holder Bernard Lama, longest-serving captain Thiago Silva. Other notable players include Ballon d'Or winners Lionel Messi and Ousmane Dembélé, as well as world-record transfer signing Neymar.

== Honours ==
As of 2026 UEFA Super Cup.

Type	Competitions	Titles	Seasons
National	Ligue 1	14	1985–86, 1993–94, 2012–13, 2013–14, 2014–15, 2015–16, 2017–18, 2018–19, 2019–20, 2021–22, 2022–23, 2023–24, 2024–25, 2025–26
National	Ligue 2	1	1970–71
National	Coupe de France	16	1981–82, 1982–83, 1992–93, 1994–95, 1997–98, 2003–04, 2005–06, 2009–10, 2014–15, 2015–16, 2016–17, 2017–18, 2019–20, 2020–21, 2023–24, 2024–25
National	Coupe de la Ligue	9	1994–95, 1997–98, 2007–08, 2013–14, 2014–15, 2015–16, 2016–17, 2017–18, 2019–20
National	Trophée des Champions	14	1995, 1998, 2013, 2014, 2015, 2016, 2017, 2018, 2019, 2020, 2022, 2023, 2024, 2025
European	UEFA Champions League	2	2024–25, 2025–26
European	UEFA Cup Winners' Cup	1	1995–96
European	UEFA Intertoto Cup	1	2001
European	UEFA Super Cup	2	2025, 2026
Worldwide	FIFA Intercontinental Cup	1^{s}	2025

- record
- ^{s} shared record

== Competitive record ==
As of 21 November 2026.

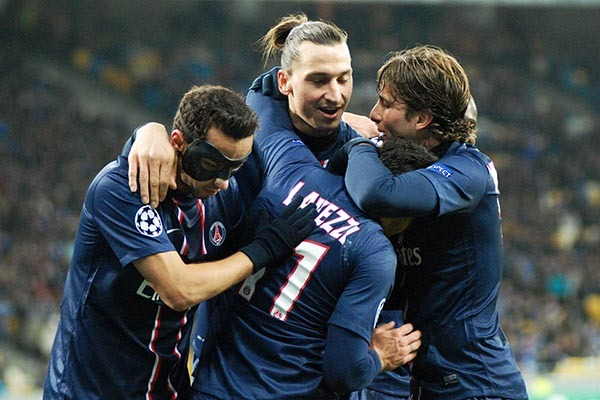
PSG players after scoring during a UEFA Champions League match against Dynamo Kyiv in 2012.

Competition	MP	W	D	L	GF	GA	GD	WP%
League
Ligue 1	1,982	986	502	494	3,293	2,102	+1191	49.75
Ligue 2	68	38	18	12	133	73	+60	55.88
Division 3 (defunct)	30	17	8	5	67	29	+38	56.67
National cups
Coupe de France	264	190	31	43	578	219	+359	71.97
Coupe de la Ligue (defunct)	76	55	6	15	150	68	+82	72.37
Trophée des Champions	19	12	5	2	34	13	+21	63.16
International cups
UEFA Champions League	193	107	35	51	403	224	+179	55.44
UEFA Europa League	72	32	24	16	106	62	+44	44.44
UEFA Cup Winners' Cup (defunct)	38	24	6	8	66	27	+39	63.16
UEFA Intertoto Cup (defunct)	8	5	3	0	20	3	+17	62.50
UEFA Super Cup	4	1	1	2	6	12	−6	25.00
FIFA Club World Cup	7	5	0	2	16	4	+12	71.43
FIFA Intercontinental Cup	1	0	1	0	1	1	+0	0.00
Total	2,762	1,472	640	650	4,873	2,837	+2036	53.29

== Club ==
As of 16 August 2026.

=== Matches ===
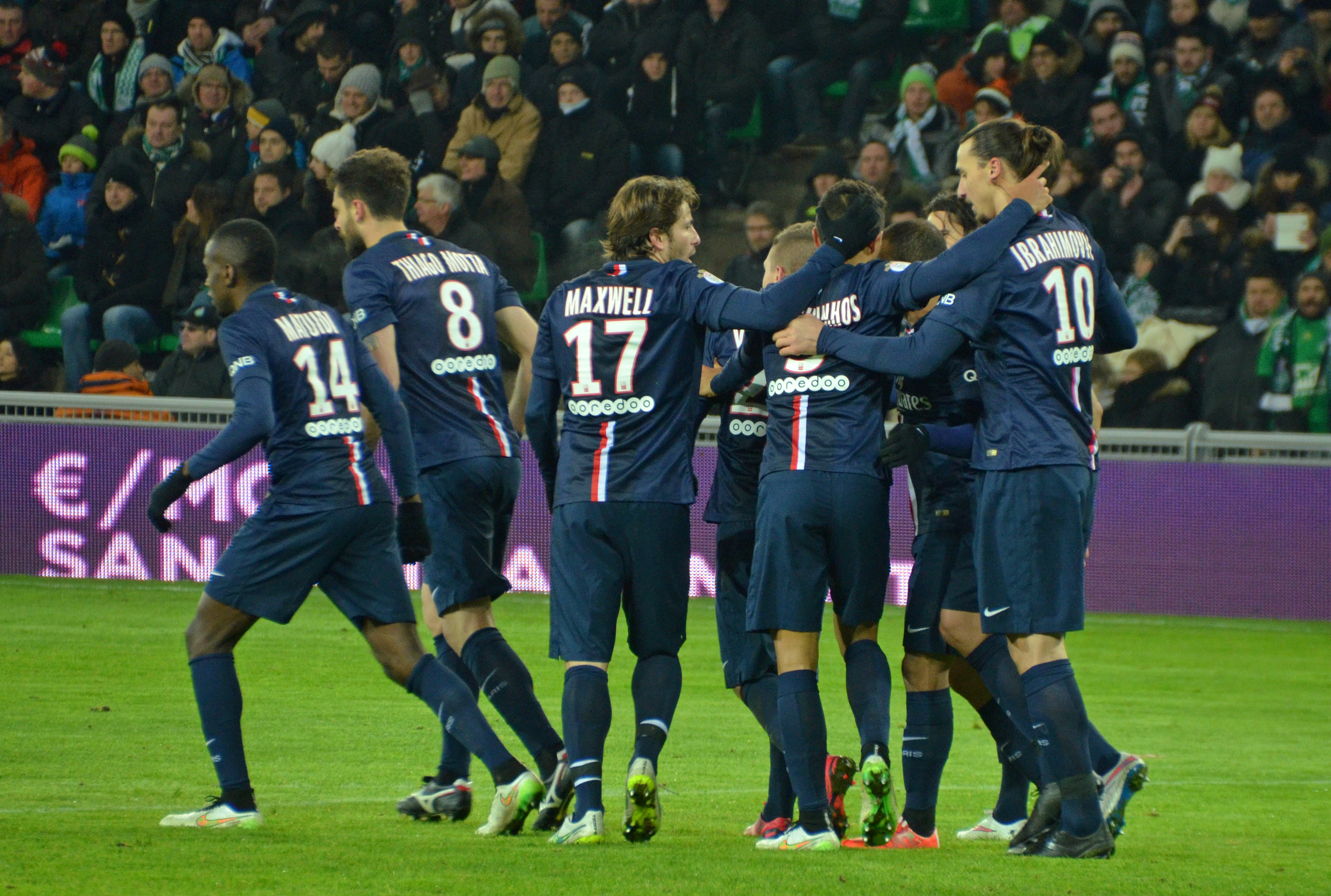
PSG players celebrating a goal during a Ligue 1 match against Saint-Étienne in 2015.

- Record win: 10–0 away to Côte Chaude, Coupe de France, 22 January 1994.
- Record defeat: 0–6 away to Nantes, Ligue 1, 1 September 1971.
- Record win in Ligue 1: 9–0.
  - Away to Troyes, 13 March 2016.
  - Home to Guingamp, 19 January 2019.
- Record defeat in Ligue 1: 0–6 away to Nantes, 1 September 1971.
- Record win in Coupe de France: 10–0 away to Côte Chaude, 22 January 1994.
- Record defeat in Coupe de France: 0–5 home to Reims, 4 May 1974.
- Record win in Coupe de la Ligue: 6–1 home to Saint-Étienne, 8 January 2020.
- Record defeat in Coupe de la Ligue: 0–3 home to Bordeaux, 4 February 2009.
- Record win in Trophée des Champions: 4–0.
  - Neutral venue to Monaco, 4 August 2018.
  - Neutral venue to Nantes, 31 July 2022.
- Record defeat in Trophée des Champions: 0–1.
  - Neutral venue to Lille, 1 August 2021.
  - Away to Lens, 16 August 2026.
- Record win in international competitions: 7–0 home to Brest, UEFA Champions League, 19 February 2025.
- Record defeat in international competitions: 1–6.
  - Home to Juventus, UEFA Super Cup, 15 January 1997.
  - Away to Barcelona, UEFA Champions League, 8 March 2017.

=== Streaks ===
- Longest winning run: 16 matches.
- Longest winning run in Ligue 1: 14 matches.
- Longest winning run in national cups: 49 matches.
- Longest winning run in Coupe de France: 29 matches.
- Longest winning run in Coupe de la Ligue: 21 matches.
- Longest winning run in UEFA competitions: 8 matches.
- Longest unbeaten run: 37 matches.
- Longest unbeaten run in Ligue 1: 36 matches.
- Longest unbeaten run in national cups: 49 matches.
- Longest unbeaten run in Coupe de France: 46 matches.
- Longest unbeaten run in Coupe de la Ligue: 23 matches.
- Longest unbeaten run in UEFA competitions: 19 matches.

=== Seasons ===
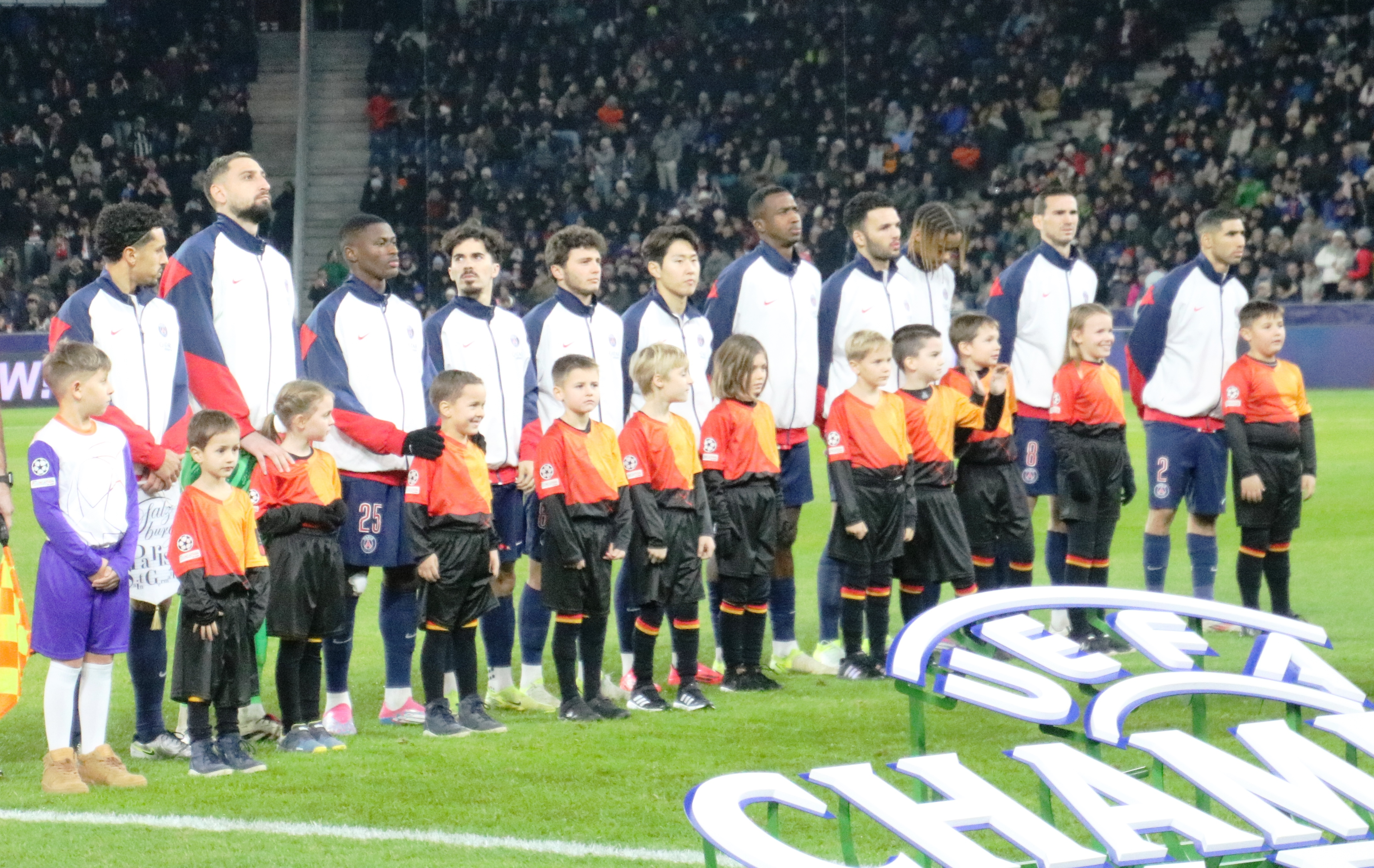
PSG away to Red Bull Salzburg in 2024, during their UEFA Champions League title-winning campaign.

- Most consecutive seasons played in Ligue 1: 52 as of 2025–26.
- Most matches played: 65 in 2024–25.
- Most goals scored: 171 in 2017–18.
- Most goals scored in Ligue 1: 108 in 2017–18.
- Most goals scored in UEFA competitions: 45 in the 2025–26 UEFA Champions League.
- Most wins: 48 in 2024–25.
- Most points in Ligue 1: 96 in 2015–16.
- Fewest goals conceded: 28 in 1993–94.
- Fewest goals conceded in Ligue 1: 19 in 2015–16.
- Fewest goals conceded in UEFA competitions: 2 in the 2002–03 UEFA Cup.

=== Attendances ===
- Highest home attendance: 49,575 vs. Waterschei, UEFA Cup Winners' Cup, 13 March 1983.
- Lowest home attendance: 2,006 vs. Mantes, Division 2, 25 April 1974.
- Highest home attendance in Ligue 1: 47,929 vs. Marseille, 23 October 2016.
- Lowest home attendance in Ligue 1: 4,520 vs. Lyon, 27 May 1980.
- Highest home attendance in Coupe de France: 47,298 vs. Monaco, 26 April 2017.
- Lowest home attendance in Coupe de France: 4,403 vs. Montluçon, 29 March 1989.
- Highest home attendance in Coupe de la Ligue: 47,576 vs. Guingamp, 9 January 2019.
- Lowest home attendance in Coupe de la Ligue: 9,872 vs. Toulouse, 14 February 1995.
- Highest home attendance in UEFA competitions: 49,575 vs. Waterschei, UEFA Cup Winners' Cup, 13 March 1983.
- Lowest home attendance in UEFA competitions: 9,117 vs. Karpaty Lviv, UEFA Europa League, 30 September 2010.

== Personnel ==
As of 21 November 2026.

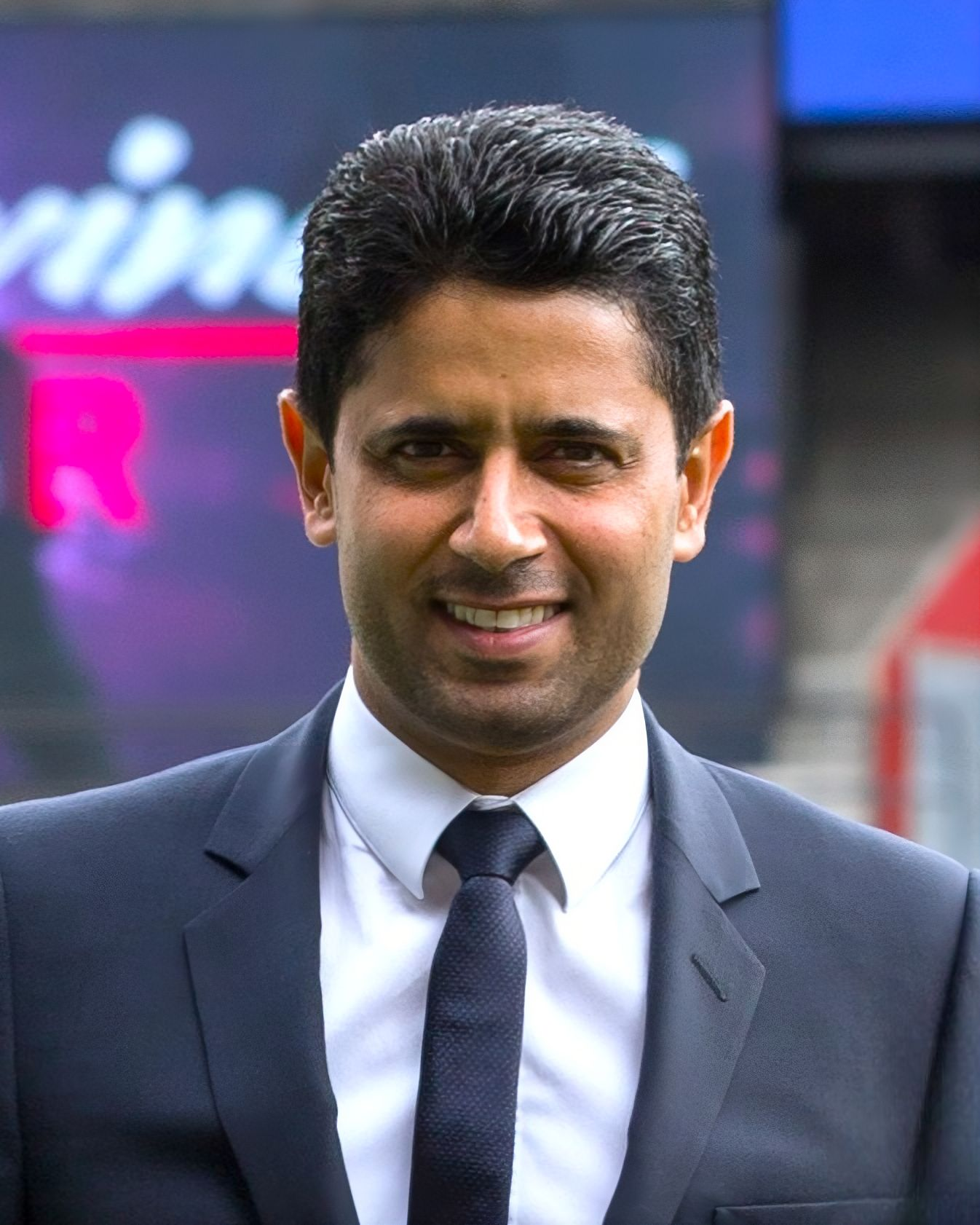
Nasser Al-Khelaifi

=== Presidents ===
- Most titles won: 43 titles – Nasser Al-Khelaifi.
- Most international titles won: 5 titles – Nasser Al-Khelaifi.
- Most titles won in UEFA competitions: 4 titles – Nasser Al-Khelaifi.
- Longest-serving: 14 years, 6 months, 15 days – Nasser Al-Khelaifi.

=== Managers ===
- Most titles won: 13 titles – Luis Enrique.
- Most international titles won: 5 titles – Luis Enrique.
- Most titles won in UEFA competitions: 4 titles – Luis Enrique.
- Most matches managed: 244 matches – Luis Fernandez.
- Most matches managed in international competitions: 60 matches – Luis Enrique.
- Most matches managed in UEFA competitions: 52 matches – Luis Enrique.
- Most matches won: 130 wins – Luis Enrique.
- Most matches won in international competitions: 36 wins – Luis Enrique.
- Most matches won in UEFA competitions: 31 wins – Luis Enrique.
- Highest win percentage: 76.32% – Unai Emery.
- Longest-serving: 3 years, 7 months – Georges Peyroche.

== Appearances ==
=== Most appearances ===
As of 21 November 2026.

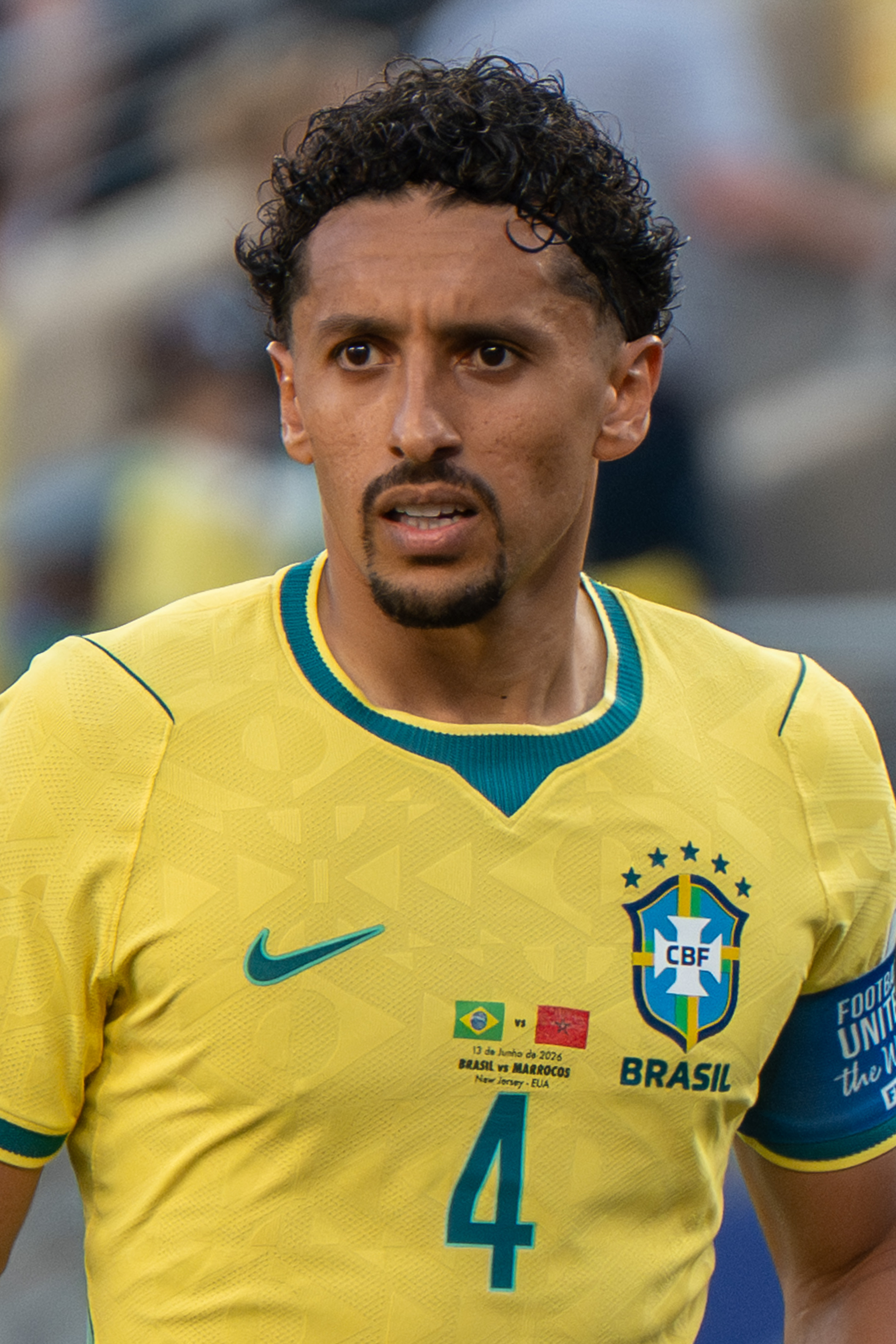
Marquinhos

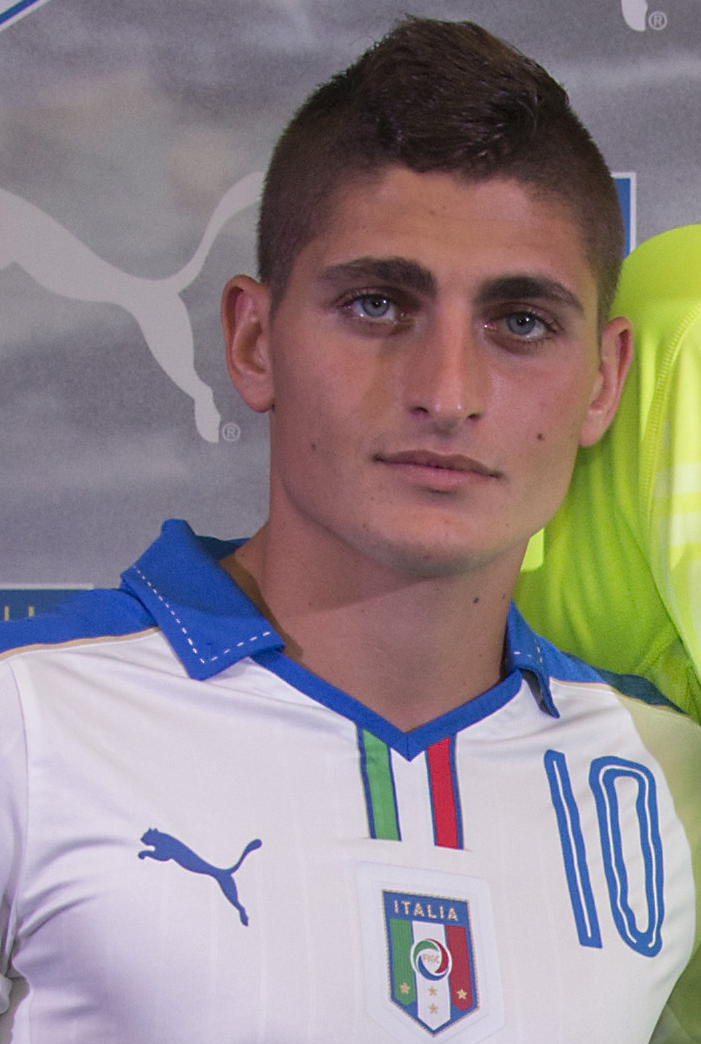
Marco Verratti

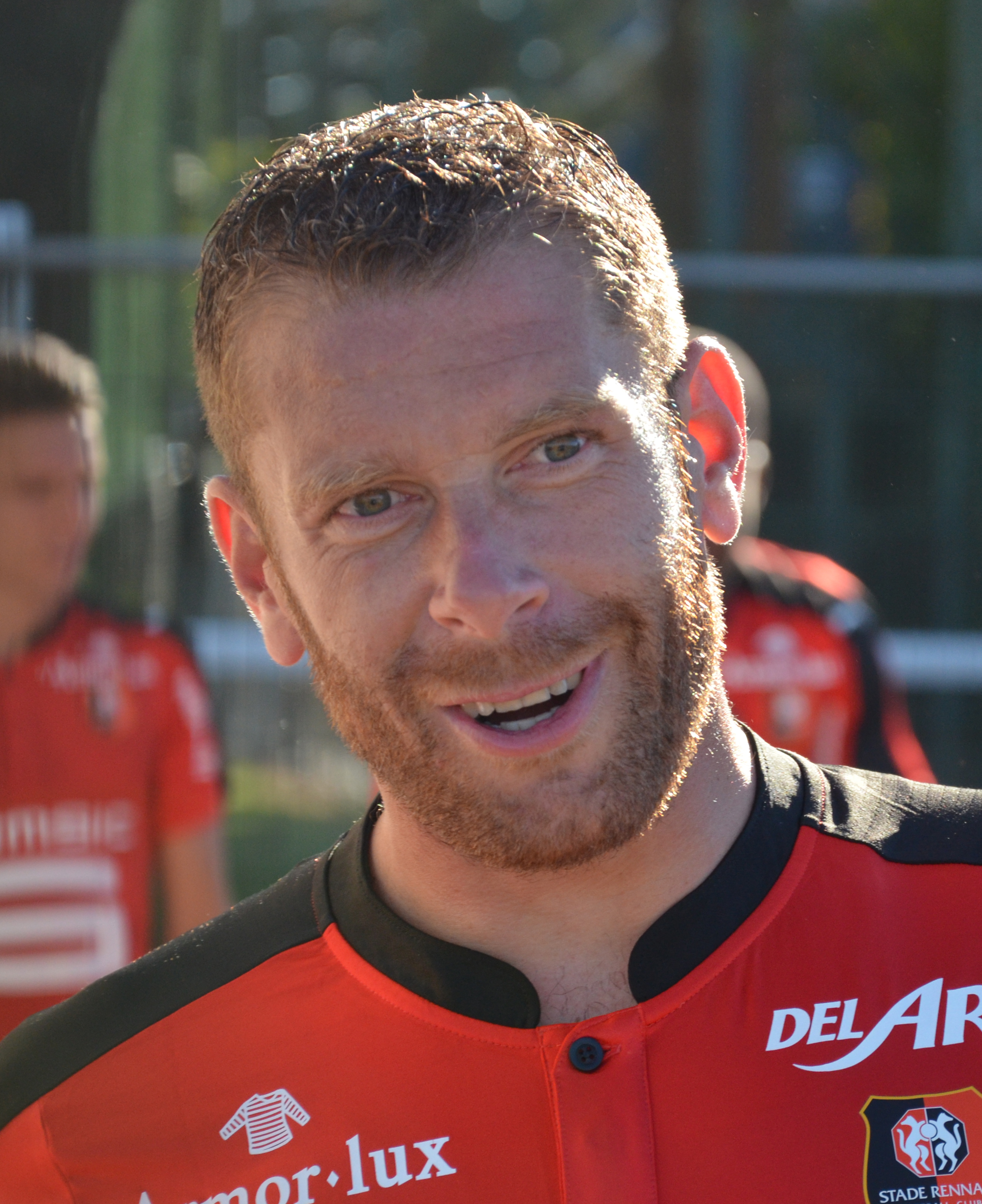
Sylvain Armand

Rank	Player	Appearances
1	(Brazil) Marquinhos	532
2	(France) Jean-Marc Pilorget	435
3	(Italy) Marco Verratti	416
4	(France) Sylvain Armand	380
5	(Socialist Federal Republic of Yugoslavia) Safet Sušić	344
6	(France) Paul Le Guen	344
7	(France) Bernard Lama	318
8	(Brazil) Thiago Silva	315
9	(Algeria) Mustapha Dahleb	310
10	(France) Kylian Mbappé	308

=== Most appearances in Ligue 1 ===
As of 21 November 2026.

Rank	Player	Appearances
1	(France) Jean-Marc Pilorget	371
2	(Brazil) Marquinhos	332
3	(Socialist Federal Republic of Yugoslavia) Safet Sušić	287
4	(France) Sylvain Armand	285
5	(Italy) Marco Verratti	276
6	(Algeria) Mustapha Dahleb	268
7	(France) Joël Bats	254
8	(France) Paul Le Guen	248
9	(France) Bernard Lama	242
10	(France) Dominique Baratelli	239

=== Most appearances in international competitions ===
As of 3 November 2026.

Rank	Player	UCL	UEL	USC	UCWC	UIC	FCWC	FIC	Total
1	(Brazil) Marquinhos	124	0	2	0	0	6	1	133
2	(Italy) Marco Verratti	79	0	0	0	0	0	0	79
3	(Morocco) Achraf Hakimi	61	0	2	0	0	7	0	70
4	(Portugal) Vitinha	58	0	2	0	0	7	1	68
5	(France) Kylian Mbappé	64	0	0	0	0	0	0	64
6	(Portugal) Nuno Mendes	54	0	2	0	0	7	1	64
7	(Brazil) Thiago Silva	60	0	0	0	0	0	0	60
8	(France) Paul Le Guen	20	10	2	25	0	0	0	57
9	(Spain) Fabián Ruiz	46	0	2	0	0	7	1	56
10	(France) Warren Zaïre-Emery	46	0	2	0	0	7	1	56
11	(Argentina) Ángel Di María	54	0	0	0	0	0	0	54
12	(Uruguay) Edinson Cavani	54	0	0	0	0	0	0	54
13	(France) Bradley Barcola	43	0	1	0	0	6	1	51
14	(France) Vincent Guérin	16	10	2	22	0	0	0	50
15	(France) Ousmane Dembélé	42	0	2	0	0	4	1	49

== Goalscorers ==
=== Most goals ===
As of 18 July 2024.

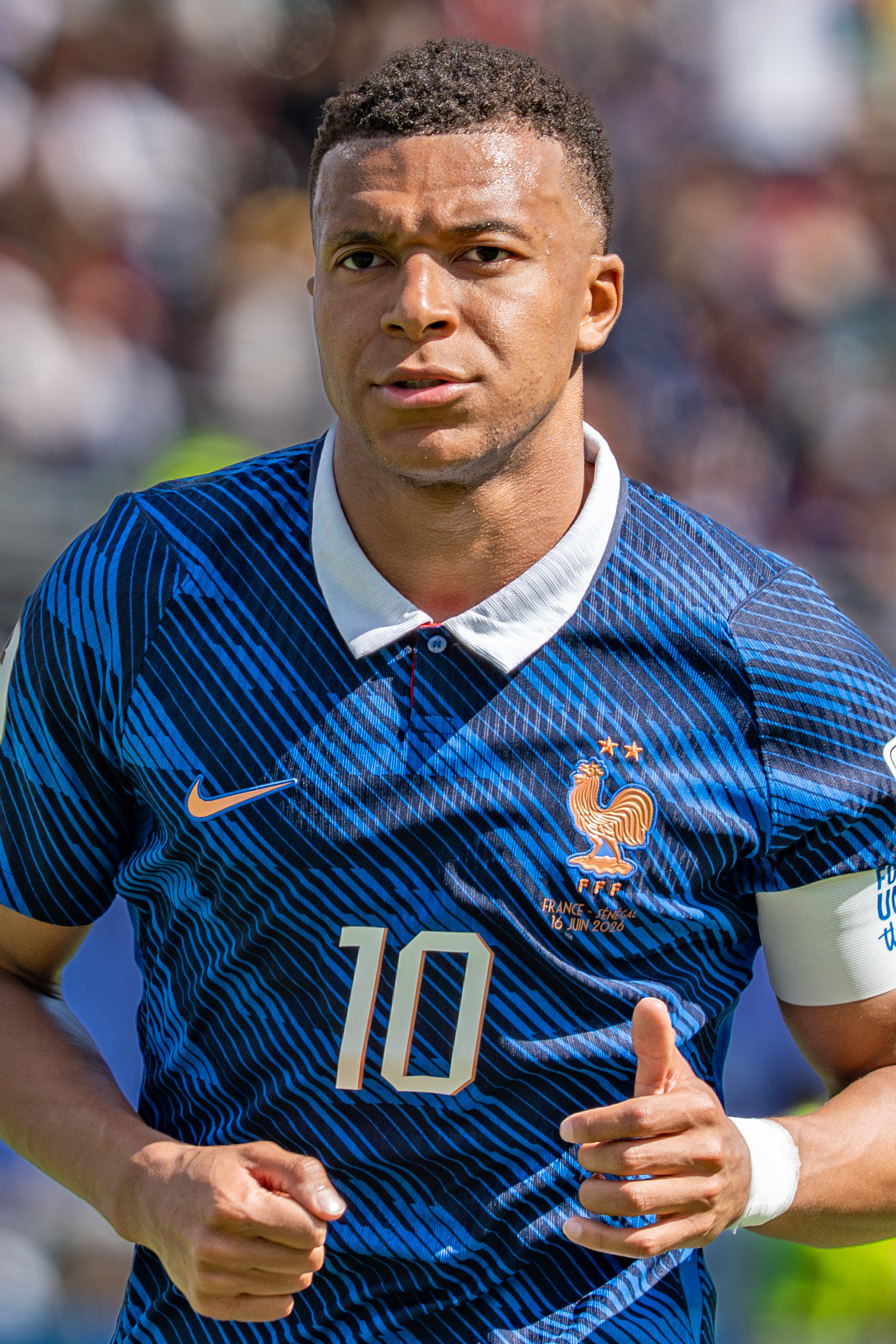
Kylian Mbappé

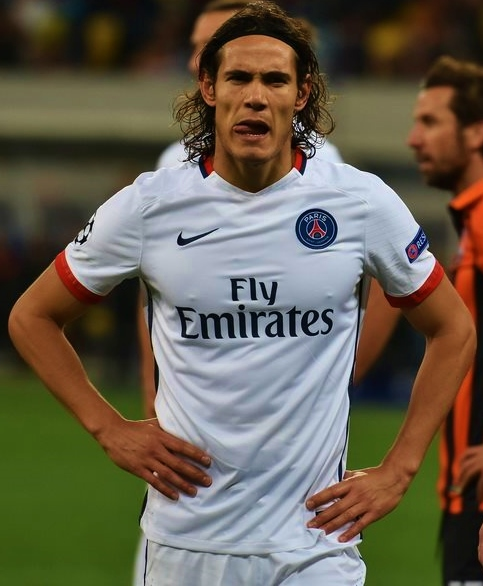
Edinson Cavani

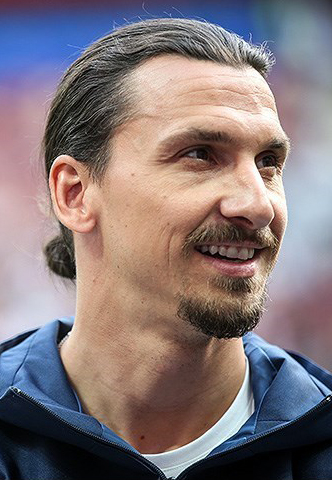
Zlatan Ibrahimović

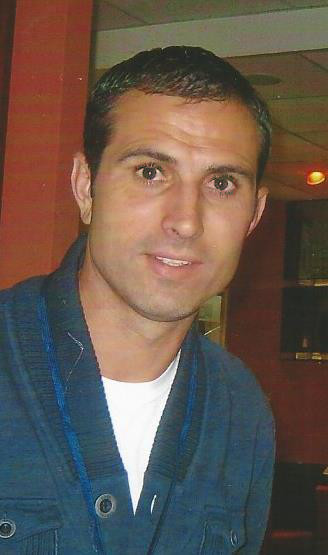
Pauleta

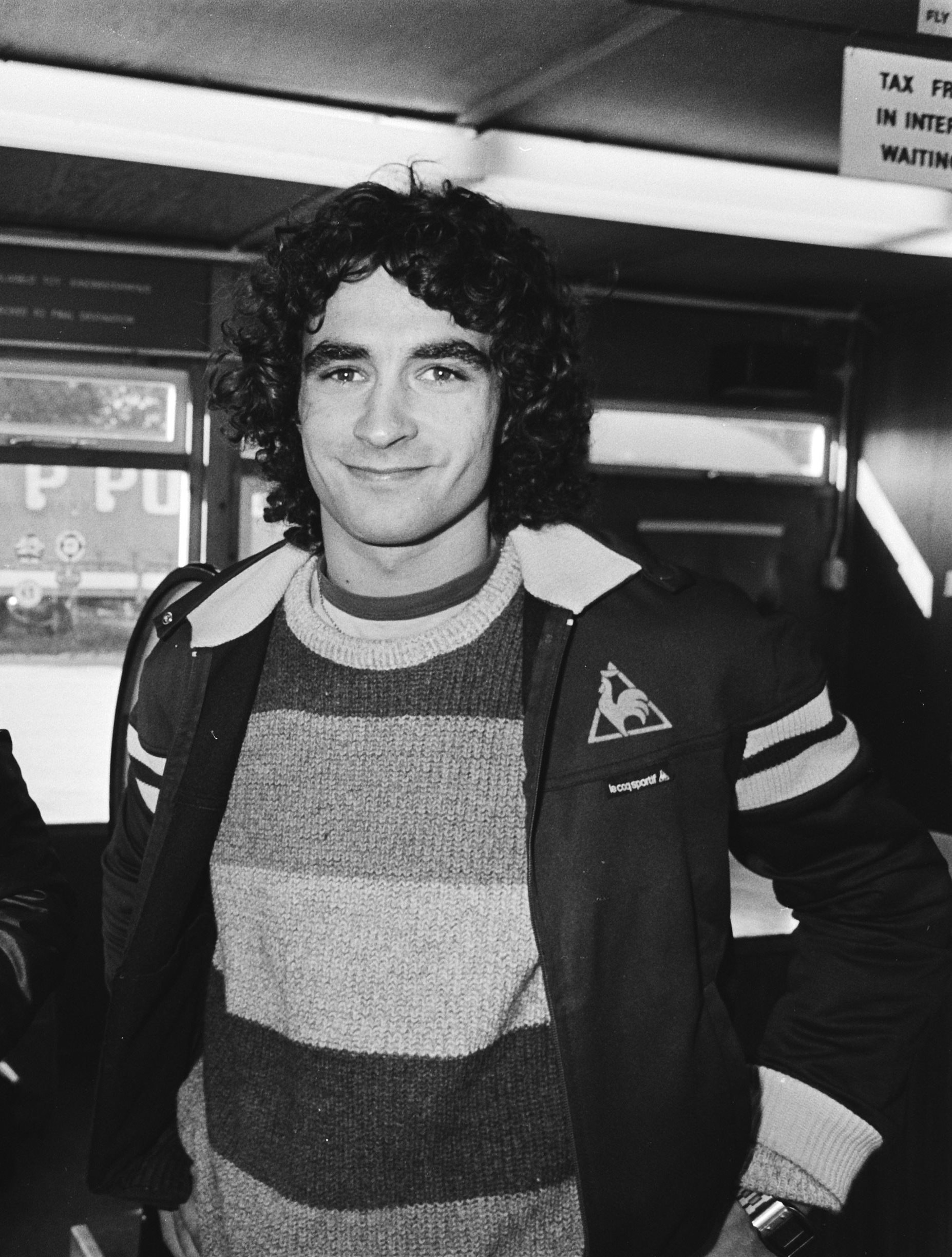
Dominique Rocheteau

Rank	Player	Goals
1	(France) Kylian Mbappé	256
2	(Uruguay) Edinson Cavani	200
3	(Sweden) Zlatan Ibrahimović	156
4	(Brazil) Neymar	118
5	(Portugal) Pauleta	109
6	(France) Dominique Rocheteau	100
7	(Algeria) Mustapha Dahleb	98
8	(Republic of the Congo) François M'Pelé	95
9	(Argentina) Ángel Di María	92
10	(Socialist Federal Republic of Yugoslavia) Safet Sušić	85

=== Most goals in Ligue 1 ===
As of 18 July 2024.

Rank	Player	Goals
1	(France) Kylian Mbappé	175
2	(Uruguay) Edinson Cavani	138
3	(Sweden) Zlatan Ibrahimović	113
4	(Algeria) Mustapha Dahleb	85
5	(France) Dominique Rocheteau	83
6	(Brazil) Neymar	82
7	(Portugal) Pauleta	76
8	(Socialist Federal Republic of Yugoslavia) Safet Sušić	66
9	(Argentina) Carlos Bianchi	64
10	(Republic of the Congo) François M'Pelé	60

=== Most goals in national cups ===
As of 3 April 2024.

Rank	Player	CdF	CdL	TdC	Total
1	(France) Kylian Mbappé	35	2	2	39
2	(Uruguay) Edinson Cavani	16	15	1	32
3	(Republic of the Congo) François M'Pelé	28	0	0	28
4	(Portugal) Pauleta	16	10	0	26
5	(Sweden) Zlatan Ibrahimović	16	5	2	23
6	(Argentina) Ángel Di María	11	8	3	22
7	(Socialist Federal Republic of Yugoslavia) Safet Sušić	15	0	0	15
8	(Brazil) Neymar	8	3	3	14
9	(France) Dominique Rocheteau	14	0	0	14
10	(Algeria) Mustapha Dahleb	13	0	0	13

=== Most goals in international competitions ===
As of 3 November 2026.

Rank	Player	UCL	UEL	USC	UCWC	UIC	FCWC	FIC	Total
1	(France) Kylian Mbappé	42	0	0	0	0	0	0	42
2	(Uruguay) Edinson Cavani	30	0	0	0	0	0	0	30
3	(France) Ousmane Dembélé	21	0	0	0	0	2	0	23
4	(Brazil) Neymar	22	0	0	0	0	0	0	22
5	(Sweden) Zlatan Ibrahimović	20	0	0	0	0	0	0	20
6	(Liberia) George Weah	8	7	0	1	0	0	0	16
7	(Georgia (country)) Khvicha Kvaratskhelia	13	0	1	0	0	1	1	16
8	(France) Désiré Doué	13	0	1	0	0	1	0	15
9	(Argentina) Ángel Di María	14	0	0	0	0	0	0	14
10	(Portugal) Vitinha	12	0	0	0	0	1	0	13
11	(Brazil) Marquinhos	11	0	0	0	0	0	0	11
12	(Brazil) Raí	6	0	2	3	0	0	0	11
13	(France) Peguy Luyindula	0	10	0	0	0	0	0	10
14	(Spain) Fabián Ruiz	6	0	0	0	0	3	0	9
15	(Morocco) Achraf Hakimi	6	0	0	0	0	2	0	8
16	(Portugal) Gonçalo Ramos	5	0	1	0	0	1	0	7
17	(Portugal) Nuno Mendes	7	0	0	0	0	0	0	7
18	(France) Bradley Barcola	6	0	0	0	0	0	0	6
19	(France) Senny Mayulu	5	0	0	0	0	1	0	6
20	(Portugal) João Neves	4	0	0	0	0	2	0	6

== Assists leaders ==
=== Most assists ===
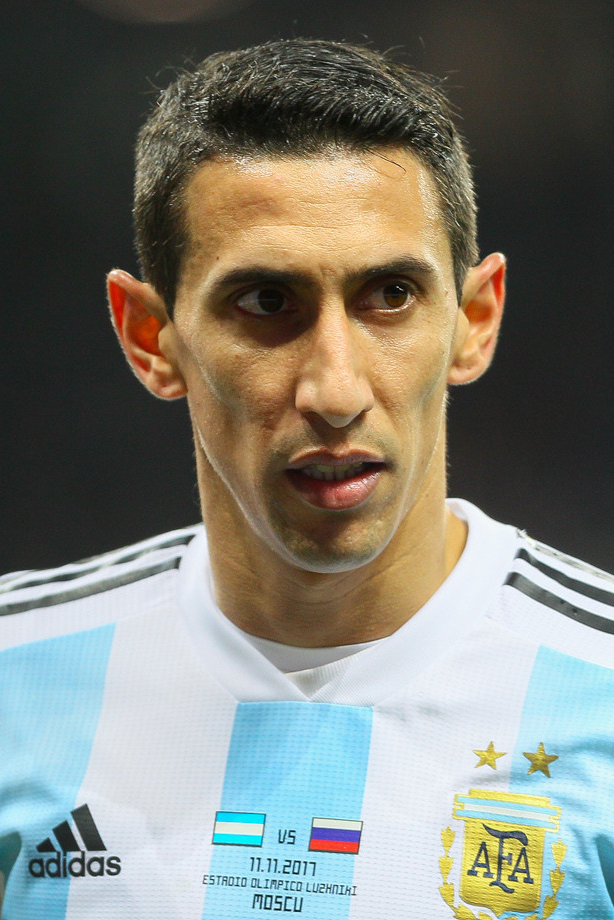
Ángel Di María

As of 24 April 2024.

Rank	Player	Assists
1	(Argentina) Ángel Di María	112
2	(Socialist Federal Republic of Yugoslavia) Safet Sušić	103
3	(France) Kylian Mbappé	96
4	(Algeria) Mustapha Dahleb	80
5	(Brazil) Neymar	70
6	(Italy) Marco Verratti	56
7	(Argentina) Javier Pastore	56
8	(Sweden) Zlatan Ibrahimović	53
9	(France) Jérôme Rothen	52
10	(Brazil) Lucas Moura	45
11	(France) Ousmane Dembélé	44
12	(Morocco) Achraf Hakimi	43

== Clean sheets ==
=== Most clean sheets ===
As of 9 July 2025.

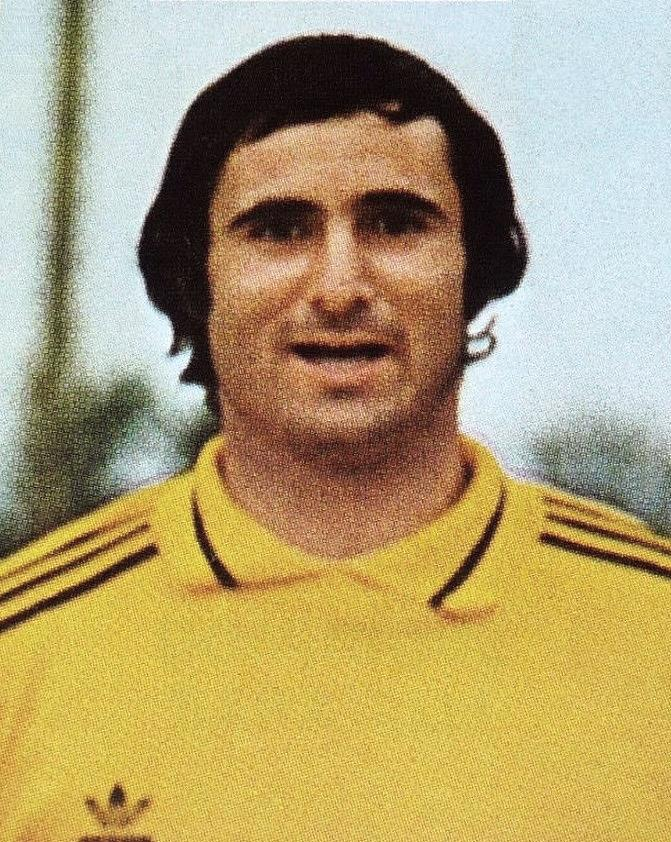
Dominique Baratelli

Rank	Player	Clean sheets
1	(France) Bernard Lama	138
2	(France) Joël Bats	112
3	(Italy) Salvatore Sirigu	84
4	(France) Lionel Letizi	80
5	(France) Dominique Baratelli	77
6	(France) Mickaël Landreau	60
7	(Italy) Gianluigi Donnarumma	56
8	(France) Alphonse Areola	52
9	(Costa Rica) Keylor Navas	52
10	(Germany) Kevin Trapp	48

== Captaincy ==
=== Captains ===
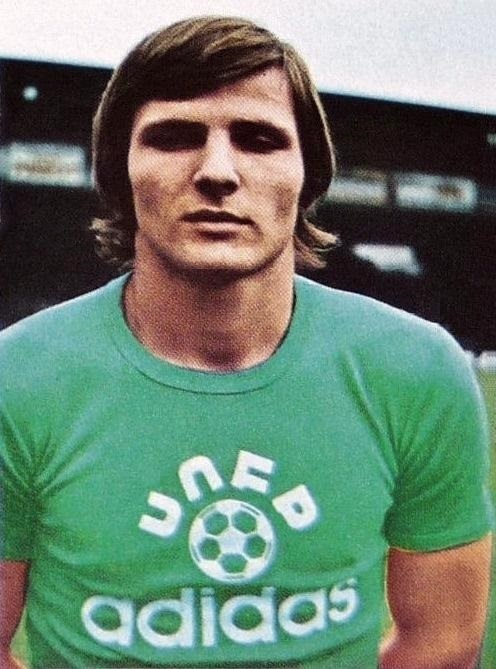
Dominique Bathenay

No.	Player	Captaincy	Source
1	(France) Jean Djorkaeff	1970–72	
2	(France) Camille Choquier	1972–73	
3	(France) Jean-Pierre Dogliani	1973–76	
4	(Algeria) Mustapha Dahleb	1976–78	
5	(France) Dominique Bathenay	1978–85	
6	(France) Luis Fernandez	1985–86	
7	(France) Jean-Marc Pilorget	1986–87	
8	(France) Fabrice Poullain	1987–88	
9	(Senegal) Oumar Sène	1988–90	
10	(Socialist Federal Republic of Yugoslavia) Safet Sušić	1990–91	
11	(France) Paul Le Guen	1991–94	
12	(France) David Ginola	1994	
13	(France) Alain Roche	1994–95	
14	(France) Bernard Lama	1995–96	

No.	Player	Captaincy	Source
15	(Brazil) Raí	1996–98	
16	(Italy) Marco Simone	1998–99	
17	(Algeria) Ali Benarbia	1999–2000	
18	(France) Éric Rabésandratana	2000	
19	(France) Frédéric Déhu	2000–02; 2003–04	
20	(Argentina) Mauricio Pochettino	2002–03	
21	(France) José-Karl Pierre-Fanfan	2004–05	
22	(Portugal) Pauleta	2005–08	
23	(France) Claude Makélélé	2008–11	
24	(France) Mamadou Sakho	2011–12	
25	(France) Christophe Jallet	2012	
26	(Brazil) Thiago Silva	2012–2020	
27	(Brazil) Marquinhos	2020–	

=== Most captaincies ===
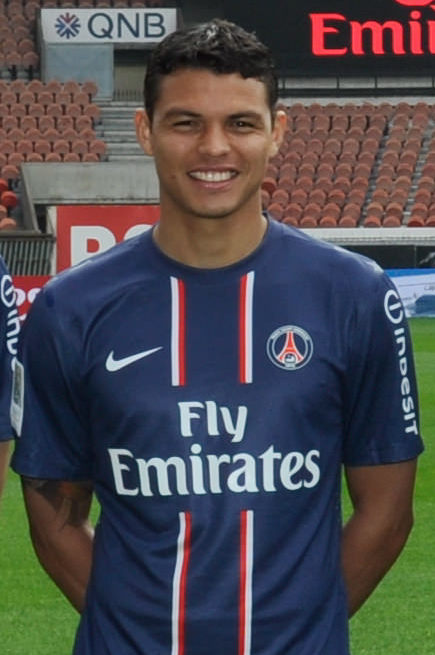
Thiago Silva

As of 20 October 2026.

Rank	Player	Captaincies
1	(Brazil) Thiago Silva	293
2	(Brazil) Marquinhos	276
3	(France) Dominique Bathenay	227
4	(France) Claude Makélélé	115
5	(Portugal) Pauleta	114
6	(France) Paul Le Guen	113
7	(France) Frédéric Déhu	105
8	(France) Jean-Pierre Dogliani	100
9	(Algeria) Mustapha Dahleb	91
10	(Brazil) Raí	71

== Transfers ==
=== Most expensive arrivals ===
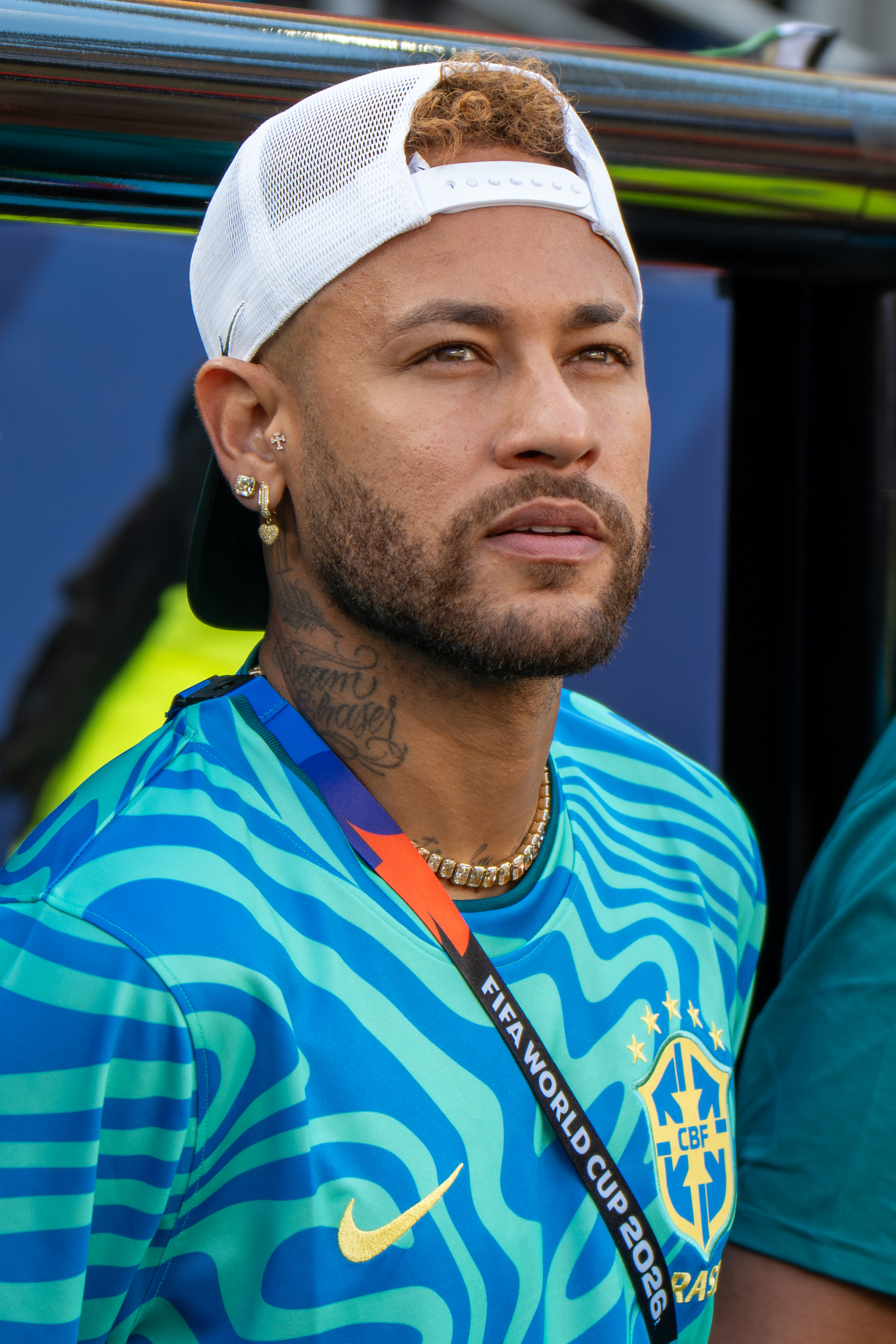
Neymar

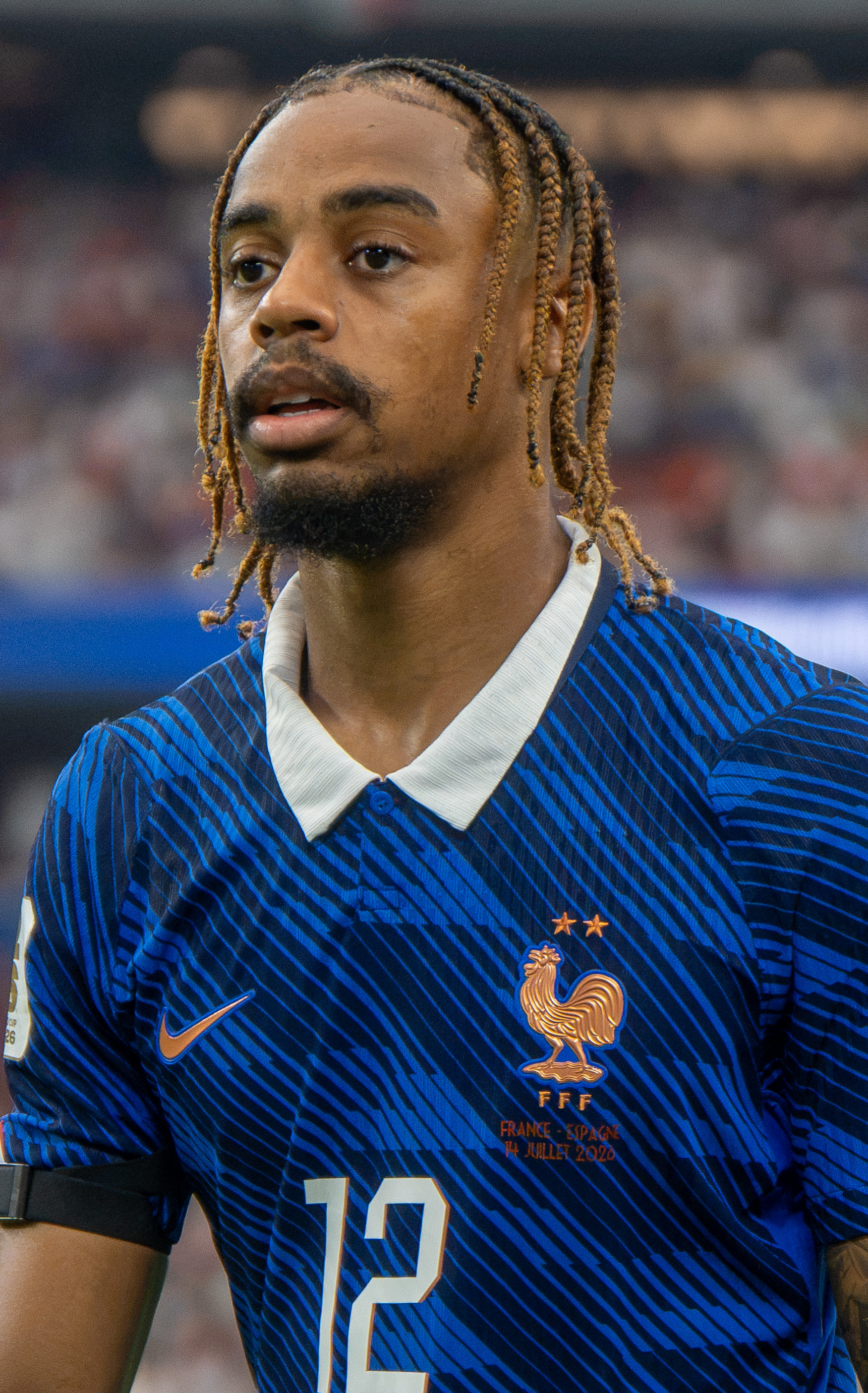
Bradley Barcola

Rank	Player	Year	From	Fee (€)	Source
1	(Brazil) Neymar	2017	(Spain) Barcelona	€222m	
2	(France) Kylian Mbappé	2018	(France) Monaco	€180m	
3	(France) Randal Kolo Muani	2023	(Germany) Eintracht Frankfurt	€75m	
4	(Georgia (country)) Khvicha Kvaratskhelia	2025	(Italy) Napoli	€70m	
5	(Portugal) Gonçalo Ramos	2023	(Portugal) Benfica	€65m	
6	(Uruguay) Edinson Cavani	2013	(Italy) Napoli	€64m	
7	(Ukraine) Illia Zabarnyi	2025	(England) Bournemouth	€63m	
8	(Argentina) Ángel Di María	2015	(England) Manchester United	€63m	
9	(Morocco) Achraf Hakimi	2021	(Italy) Internazionale	€60m	
10	(Portugal) João Neves	2024	(Portugal) Benfica	€60m	

=== Most expensive departures ===
Rank	Player	Year	To	Fee (€)	Source
1	(France) Bradley Barcola	2026	(England) Liverpool	€125m	
2	(Brazil) Neymar	2023	(Saudi Arabia) Al Hilal	€90m	
3	(Portugal) Gonçalo Ramos	2026	(Italy) AC Milan	€74m	
4	(Senegal) Ibrahim Mbaye	2026	(England) Aston Villa	€55m	
5	(Netherlands) Xavi Simons	2025	(Germany) RB Leipzig	€50m	
6	(Uruguay) Manuel Ugarte	2024	(England) Manchester United	€50m	
7	(Italy) Marco Verratti	2023	(Qatar) Al-Arabi	€45m	
8	(Portugal) Gonçalo Guedes	2018	(Spain) Valencia	€40m	
9	(South Korea) Lee Kang-in	2026	(Spain) Atlético Madrid	€40m	
10	(France) Randal Kolo Muani	2026	(Italy) Juventus	€38m	

== Awards ==
=== France Football ===
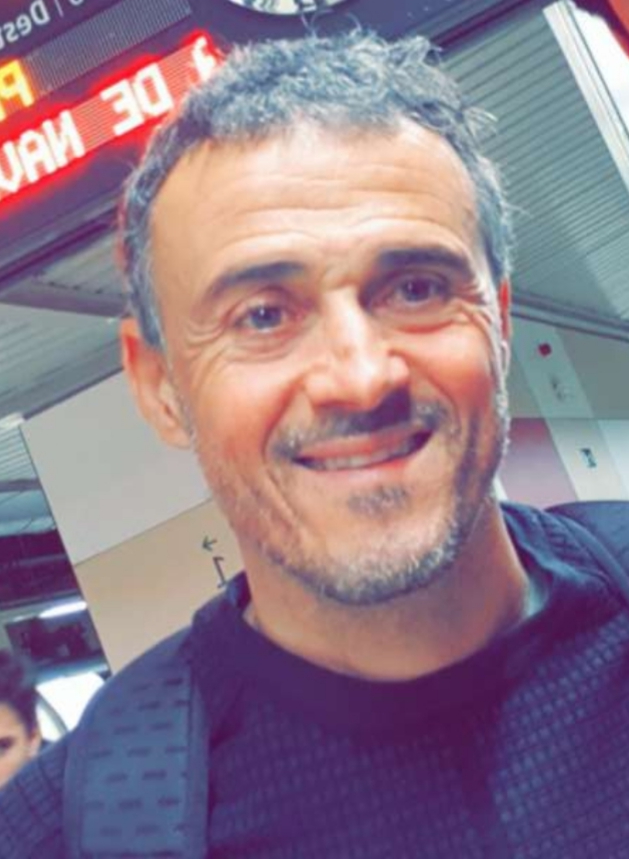
Luis Enrique

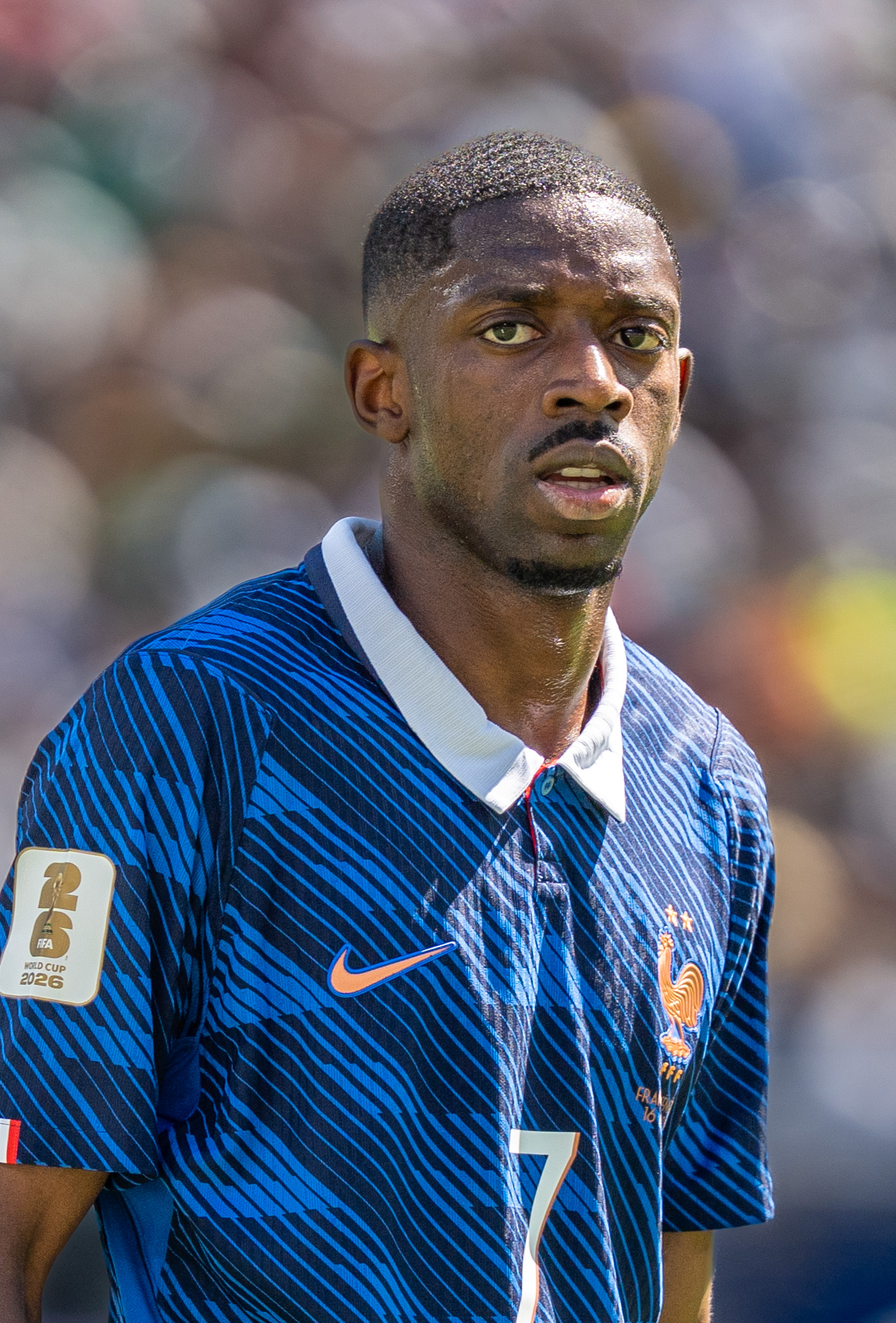
Ousmane Dembélé

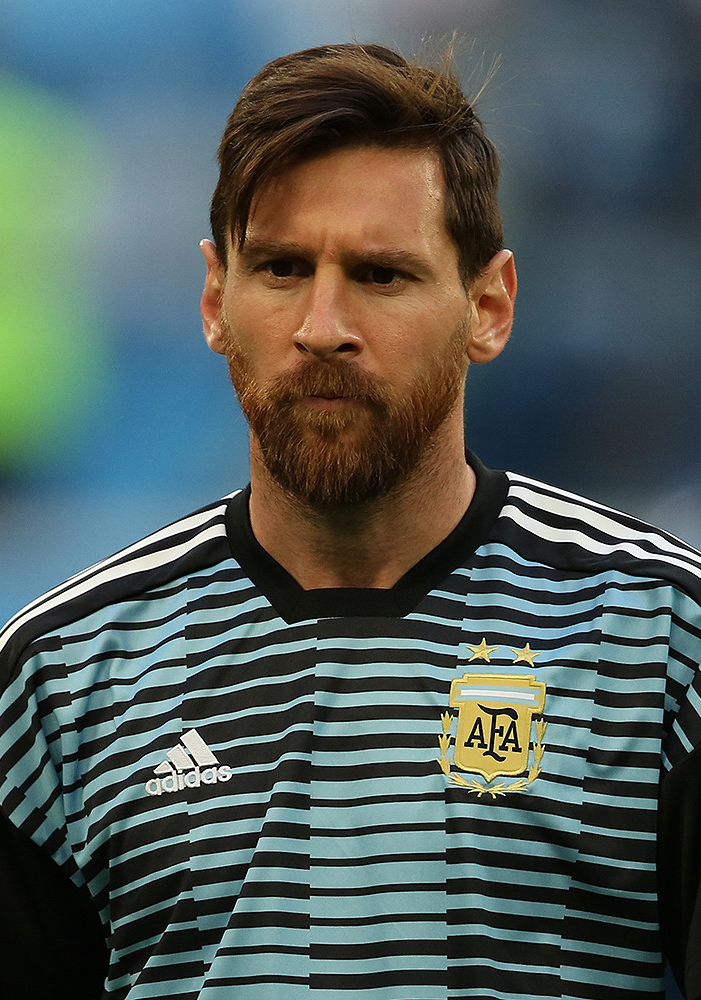
Lionel Messi

- Men's Club of the Year (2)
  - (France) Paris Saint-Germain – 2025, 2026.
- Ballon d'Or (2)
  - (Argentina) Lionel Messi – 2021.
  - (France) Ousmane Dembélé – 2025.
- Kopa Trophy (1)
  - (France) Kylian Mbappé – 2018.
- Yashin Trophy (2)
  - (Italy) Gianluigi Donnarumma (2) – 2021, 2025.
- Gerd Müller Trophy (1)
  - (France) Kylian Mbappé – 2024.
- Johan Cruyff Trophy (1)
  - (Spain) Luis Enrique – 2025.

=== FIFA ===
- The Best FIFA Men's Player (2)
  - (Argentina) Lionel Messi – 2022.
  - (France) Ousmane Dembélé – 2025.
- The Best FIFA Football Coach (1)
  - (Spain) Luis Enrique – 2025.

=== UEFA ===
- UEFA Champions League Player of the Season (2)
  - (France) Ousmane Dembélé – 2025.
  - (Georgia (country)) Khvicha Kvaratskhelia – 2026.
- UEFA Champions League Young Player of the Season (1)
  - (France) Désiré Doué – 2025.

=== IFFHS ===
- IFFHS World's Best Club (2)
  - (France) Paris Saint-Germain – 1994, 2025.
- IFFHS World's Best Player (2)
  - (Argentina) Lionel Messi – 2022.
  - (France) Ousmane Dembélé – 2025.
- IFFHS World's Best Goalkeeper (2)
  - (Italy) Gianluigi Donnarumma (2) – 2021, 2025.
- IFFHS World's Best Club Coach (1)
  - (Spain) Luis Enrique – 2025.

=== Laureus ===
- Laureus World Sports Award for Team of the Year (1)
  - (France) Paris Saint-Germain – 2026.
- Laureus World Sports Award for Sportsman of the Year (1)
  - (Argentina) Lionel Messi – 2023.

=== Tuttosport ===
- Golden Boy (2)
  - (France) Kylian Mbappé – 2017.
  - (France) Désiré Doué – 2025.
