= 1976–77 Coupe de France =

Tournament details
- Country: France

The Coupe de France 1976–77 was its 60th edition. It was won by AS Saint-Étienne which defeated Stade de Reims in the Final.

== Round of 16 ==
| Team 1 | Agg. | Team 2 | 1st leg | 2nd leg |
|---|---|---|---|---|
| SCO Angers (D1) | 0–2 | RC Lens (D1) | 0–1 | 0–1 |
| Nîmes Olympique (D1) | 1–0 | Girondins de Bordeaux (D1) | 1–0 | 0–0 |
| FC Sochaux-Montbéliard (D1) | 2–2 | Paris SG (D1) | 1–0 | 1–2 |
| FC Rouen (D2) | 1–3 | AS Saint-Étienne (D1) | 1–1 | 0–2 |
| FC Nantes (D1) | 3–3 (a) | RC Strasbourg (D2) | 2–0 | 1–3 |
| Stade de Reims (D1) | 6–2 | AS Monaco (D2) | 2–0 | 4–2 |
| OGC Nice (D1) | 11–2 | ASPV Strasbourg (DH) | 4–1 | 7–1 |
| FC Gueugnon (D2) | 3–3 (a) | FC Lorient (D2) | 3–2 | 0–1 |

== Quarter-finals ==
| Team 1 | Agg. | Team 2 | 1st leg | 2nd leg |
|---|---|---|---|---|
| RC Lens (D1) | 2–2 (a) | FC Nantes (D1) | 2–1 | 0–1 |
| Nîmes Olympique (D1) | 3–5 | OGC Nice (D1) | 3–3 | 0–2 |
| FC Lorient (D2) | 4–8 | Stade de Reims (D1) | 2–0 | 2–8 |
| FC Sochaux-Montbéliard (D1) | 2–4 | AS Saint-Étienne (D1) | 1–1 | 1–3 |

== Semi-finals ==
=== First leg ===
11 June 1977

| Nantes (1) | 3–0 | Saint-Étienne (1) |
|---|---|---|
| Lopez 5' (o.g.); Rio 30' (pen.), 69' (pen.) |

Stade Marcel Saupin, Nantes
Attendance: 25,500
Referee: Robert Héliès

11 June 1977

| Nice (1) | 1–2 | Reims (1) |
|---|---|---|
| Ascery 2' | | Santamaría 40'; Buisset 53' |

Stade du Ray, Nice
Attendance: 13,848
Referee: Michel Vautrot

=== Second leg ===
14 June 1977

| Saint-Étienne (1) | 5–1 (a.e.t.) | Nantes (1) |
|---|---|---|
| P. Revelli 6'; Bathenay 32'; Santini 44'; Sarramagna 115'; H. Revelli 119' | | Michel 93' |

Stade Geoffroy-Guichard, Saint-Étienne
Attendance: 32,961
Referee: Michel Kitabdjian

Saint-Étienne won 5–4 on aggregate.

14 June 1977

| Reims (1) | 1–0 | Nice (1) |
|---|---|---|
| Maufroy 86' |

Stade Auguste Delaune, Reims
Attendance: 25,000
Referee: Achille Verbecke

Reims won 3–1 on aggregate.

== Final ==
18 June 1977

| Saint-Étienne | 2–1 | Reims |
|---|---|---|
| Bathenay 85'; Merchadier 89' | | Santamaría 63' |

Parc des Princes, Paris
Attendance: 45,454
Referee: Georges Konrath
