= Michel N'Gom =

Footballer (1959–1984)

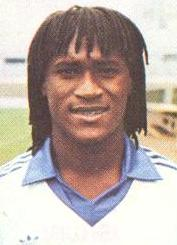
- N'Gom with Marseille

Personal information
- Birth name: Abdourhamane N'Gom
- Date of birth: 25 June 1959
- Place of birth: Dakar, French Senegal
- Date of death: 12 August 1984 (aged 25)
- Place of death: Perrigny, France
- Height: 1.72 m (5 ft 8 in)
- Position: Forward

Youth career
- –1976: AS Mazargues
- 1976–1977: Marseille

Senior career*
Years	Team	Apps	(Gls)
1977–1981	Marseille	60	(26)
1978–1979	→ Toulon (loan)	28	(9)
1981–1984	Paris Saint-Germain	72	(22)
1984	Auxerre	0	(0)
Total		160	(57)

International career
1982	France U21	1	(0)
- France Amateurs
- * Club domestic league appearances and goals

Michel N'Gom (born Abdourhamane N'Gom; 25 June 1959 – 12 August 1984) was a professional footballer who played as a forward. Born in French Senegal, he represented France at youth international level. He died at the age of 25 due to a traffic collision.

== Early life ==
Abdourhamane N'Gom was born on 25 June 1959 in Dakar in French Senegal. He moved to France at the age of four with his mother, leaving his father and brother behind. Then he started living with “Avó Bebé Rocha” who adopted him informally. He spent a large portion of his childhood in the Mazargues neighbourhood of Marseille, where he did his schooling and played as a youth player for AS Mazargues.

== Club career ==
=== Marseille ===
Having signed for the club in 1976 on a trainee contract, N'Gom made his first steps in the Division 1 with Marseille in 1977. In his debut season, he recorded one goal in seven league matches. For the second season of his career, he was loaned to Division 2 side Toulon, where he gathered more experience, making thirty appearances and scoring ten goals in all competitions. After his loan ended, he returned to Marseille, where he would play regularly for the next two seasons, scoring twenty-five more league goals in the process.

=== Paris Saint-Germain ===
In 1981, N'Gom signed for fellow Division 1 club Paris Saint-Germain (PSG). There, he would win the Coupe de France in the 1981–82 and 1982–83 seasons. Across three seasons at PSG, N'Gom made ninety appearances, scoring twenty-six goals. He notably finished as the club's top goal-scorer in both the league and in all competitions in the 1983–84 season. He signed for Auxerre in July 1984.

== International career ==
N'Gom was an under-21 and amateur international for France. He played one match at the 1982 UEFA European Under-21 Championship.

== Death ==
N'Gom died on 12 August 1984 due to a traffic collision in the Auxerre suburb of Perrigny. He had only recently signed for the local club of Auxerre. The accident occurred at 1:45 PM on a Sunday, as N'Gom was driving on a straight road towards the entrance of Perrigny. He was driving back from Paris with a rented car, having taken advantage of several days of rest accorded by his new manager at Auxerre Guy Roux. Although the departmental road was without danger, he was surprised by a tractor that appeared in the middle of the way. A collision was inevitable, and the car hit an electricity pylon, leaving N'Gom instantly dead. The scene of the accident was only a couple of hundred meters away from his home.

=== Reactions ===
The death of N'Gom brought about a reaction of great emotion in the world of football. PSG's president at the time Francis Borelli said, "It is awful, I do not know what to say. I have enormous grief. It is a tragedy and I cannot believe it, Michel was a very nice boy. To find such a horrible death at the age of twenty-five, it is terrible." All of Paris Saint-Germain's players were saddened by the news of N'Gom's passing. In 2010, Jean-Claude Lemoult spoke about when he heard the news; "I learned about his death while we were trying to do the souvenir photo of the France team after having won the gold medal at the Olympic Games in Los Angeles. It was a shock, impossible to smile for the cliché in such circumstances."

=== Funeral ===
Several days after his death, his funeral took place in Conches-sur-Gondoire. Players and staff of Paris Saint-Germain were present, and three Parisian players, Luis Fernandez, Dominique Rocheteau, and Boubacar Sarr, symbolically carried N'Gom's coffin. Borelli took the speaking role in honouring the memory of N'Gom.

== Honours ==
Paris Saint-Germain

- Coupe de France: 1981–82, 1982–83
