= Santiago Santamaría =

Argentine footballer

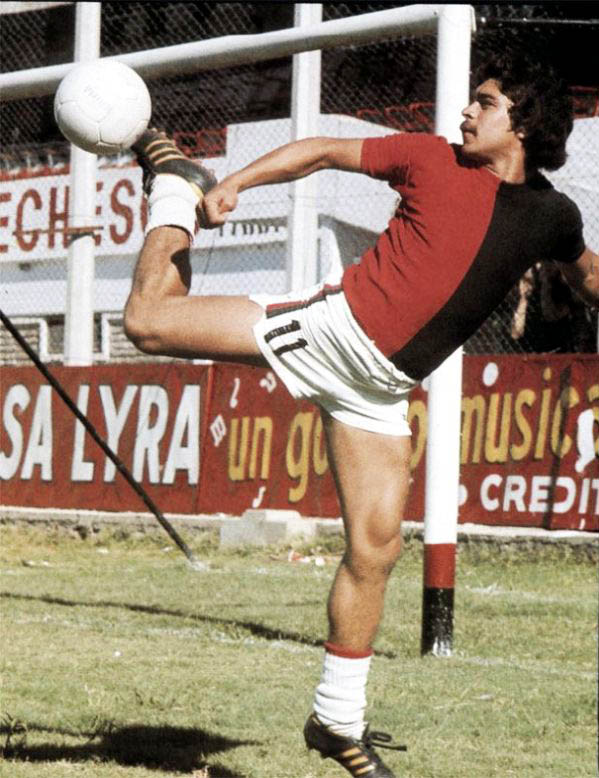
- Santamaría in early 1970s

Personal information
- Full name: Santiago Santamaría
- Date of birth: 22 August 1952
- Place of birth: San Nicolás de los Arroyos, Argentina
- Date of death: 27 July 2013 (aged 60)
- Place of death: Córdoba city, Argentina
- Height: 1.69 m (5 ft 7 in)
- Position: Winger

Senior career*
Years	Team	Apps	(Gls)
1971–1974	Newell's Old Boys		
1974–1979	Reims	148	(41)
1980–1983	Newell's Old Boys	293	(90)
1984	Talleres		

International career
1980–1982	Argentina	10	(2)
- * Club domestic league appearances and goals

Santiago "Cucurucho" Santamaría (22 August 1952 – 27 July 2013) was an Argentine professional footballer who played primarily as a winger.

During his club career he played for Newell's Old Boys (1971–1974, 1980–1983), Stade de Reims (1974–1979), and Talleres de Córdoba (1984). He played for the Argentina national team in the 1982 FIFA World Cup. In Newell's, Santamaría ranks 2nd among the all-time top scorers, with 90 goals scored during his two tenures in the club.

After his retirement, he settled in Córdoba, where he died from a heart attack on 27 July 2013.

== Highlights ==
In April 1978 Santamaría was the last player to score a hat-trick for Stade de Reims in the top flight before Boulaye Dia repeated the feat in October 2020.

== Honours ==
Newell's Old Boys

- Argentine Primera División: 1974 Metropolitano

Stade de Reims

- Coupe de France runner-up: 1976–77
- Cup of the Alps: 1977
