= Alain Préfaci =

French football manager (born 1957)

Personal information
- Date of birth: 1 March 1957 (age 69)
- Place of birth: Poissy, France
- Height: 1.72 m (5 ft 8 in)
- Positions: Forward; attacking midfielder

Team information
- Current team: US Castelginest (manager)

Youth career
- Poissy
- Paris Saint-Germain

Senior career*
Years	Team	Apps	(Gls)
1977–1981	Paris Saint-Germain B		
1981–1984	Paris Saint-Germain	2	(0)
1982–1983	→ Thonon (loan)	26	(3)
1984–1987	Amiens	59+ (Note: Statistics for the 1985–86 season are unknown.)	(4+)
- Viry-Châtillon
- Villecresnes
- Labège FC
- ASPTT Toulouse

Managerial career
- ASPTT Toulouse
- US Plaisance du Touch
- 2013–2014: AS Toulouse Mirail
- 2015–: US Castelginest
- * Club domestic league appearances and goals

Alain Préfaci (born 1 March 1957) is a French football manager and former player. As of 2020, he is the head coach of Régional 3 club US Castelginest.

== Playing career ==
Préfaci was a product of the Paris Saint-Germain Youth Academy. He made his debut for Paris Saint-Germain's first team in a 1–0 Coupe de France win against Marseille on 30 March 1982. His final match for the club was a 1–0 Coupe de France defeat against Mulhouse on 28 January 1984.

== Managerial career ==
Préfaci's first managerial role was as player-manager of ASPTT Toulouse. He would go on to coach US Plaisance du Touch and AS Toulouse Mirail before joining US Castelginest.

== Career statistics ==
Appearances and goals by club, season and competition
Club	Season	League			Cup		Total	
Club	Season	Division	Apps	Goals	Apps	Goals	Apps	Goals
Paris Saint-Germain	1981–82	Division 1	2	0	2	0	4	0
Paris Saint-Germain	1983–84	Division 1	0	0	1	0	1	0
Paris Saint-Germain	Total		2	0	3	0	5	0
Thonon-les-Bains (loan)	1982–83	Division 2	26	3	1	0	27	3
Amiens	1984–85	Division 2	32	2	1	0	33	2
Amiens	1986–87	Division 2	27	2	0	0	27	2
Amiens	Total		59	4	1	0	60	4
Career total			87	7	5	0	92	7

== Honours ==
Paris Saint-Germain

- Coupe de France: 1981–82
