= Patrice Augustin =

French footballer (born 1955)

Personal information
- Full name: Patrice Augustin
- Date of birth: 27 May 1955 (age 71)
- Place of birth: Saint-Sauvant, France
- Height: 1.82 m (5 ft 11 1/2 in)
- Position: Striker

Senior career*
| Years | Team | Apps | (Gls) |
| 1973–1974 | Chamois Niortais | ? | (?) |
| 1974–1980 | Angers | 154 | (31) |
| 1980–1982 | Tours | 71 | (12) |
| 1982–1983 | Brest | 5 | (0) |
| 1983–1985 | Thonon-les-Bains | 66 | (21) |
| 1985–1987 | Chamois Niortais | 62 | (8) |
- * Club domestic league appearances and goals

Patrice Augustin (born 27 May 1955) is a former professional footballer.
