= Nambatingue Toko =

Chadian footballer (1952–2026)

Personal information
- Full name: Nambatingue Tokomon Dieudonné
- Date of birth: 21 August 1952
- Place of birth: N'Djamena, French Chad, French Equatorial Africa
- Date of death: 10 February 2026 (aged 73)
- Height: 1.87 m (6 ft 2 in)
- Position: Striker

Youth career
- Albi

Senior career*
Years	Team	Apps	(Gls)
1975–1978	Nice	78	(18)
1978	Bordeaux	9	(1)
1978–1979	Strasbourg	17	(1)
1979–1980	Valenciennes	35	(12)
1980–1985	Paris Saint-Germain	135	(29)
1985–1986	RC Paris	17	(2)
Total		291	(63)

International career
- Chad
- * Club domestic league appearances and goals

Nambatingue Tokomon Dieudonné, often shortened to Nambatingue Toko (21 August 1952 – 10 February 2026), was a Chadian professional footballer who played as a striker. He spent all of his career in France.

== Playing career ==
Toko was born in Fort-Lamy, French-ruled Chad (now N'Djamena, Chad). He started at Grenoble and Albi before signing for Nice in 1975. He was the first Chadian to turn professional in France. He moved to Bordeaux and then Strasbourg, where he won the 1978–79 French Division 1. He is best remembered for his time at Paris Saint-Germain (PSG), where he became French cup winner in 1982 and 1983, scoring in both finals, including the winner in 1983. He was also PSG's first scorer in European competitions. He finished his playing career at Racing Club in Paris.

== Coaching career ==
In 1990 Toko became a member of the technical staff at Paris Saint-Germain. He became a French state graduated professional coach assisting various coaches like Alain Giresse, Artur Jorge, and Alex Hill. He was in charge of assessing opposing teams and talent scouting for more than 11 years, until the arrival of Laurent Perpère as a new club president in 1999.

== Death ==
On 10 February 2026, Toko died at the age of 73.

== Honours ==
Strasbourg

- Division 1: 1978–79

Paris Saint-Germain

- Coupe de France: 1981–82, 1982–83; runner-up: 1984–85
