= 1981–82 Coupe de France =

Tournament details
- Country: France

The Coupe de France 1981–82 was its 65th edition. It was won by Paris SG which defeated AS Saint-Étienne in the Final.

== Round of 16 ==
Team 1	Agg.	Team 2	1st leg	2nd leg
Girondins de Bordeaux (D1)	4–2	AS Monaco (D1)	2–1	2–1
AS Saint-Étienne (D1)	5–3	Stade Brestois (D1)	2–0	3–3
SC Bastia (D1)	4–3	Olympique Lyonnais (D1)	2–0	2–3
Tours FC (D1)	6–5	FC Metz (D1)	4–1	2–4
Olympique de Marseille (D2)	1–4	Paris SG (D1)	0–1	1–3
Sporting Toulon Var (D2)	4–2	AS Nancy (D1)	2–1	2–1
Valenciennes FC (D1)	4–2	Le Havre AC (D2)	2–0	2–2
Stade Lavallois (D1)	2–1	Besançon RC (D2)	2–1	0–0

== Quarter-finals ==
Team 1	Agg.	Team 2	1st leg	2nd leg
Paris SG (D1)	3–2	Girondins de Bordeaux (D1)	2–0	1–2 (a.e.t.)
Sporting Toulon Var (D2)	2–3	Tours FC (D1)	1–1	1–2
AS Saint-Étienne (D1)	1–0	Stade Lavallois (D1)	1–0	0–0
US Valenciennes (D1)	1–3	SC Bastia (D1)	1–0	0–3

== Semi-finals ==
11 May 1982

Paris Saint-Germain (1)	0–0 (a.e.t.)	Tours (1)
Penalties
Bathenay (penalty missed); N'Gom (penalty missed); Rocheteau (penalty scored); Renaut (penalty scored)	2–1	(penalty scored) Steck; (penalty missed) Dehon; (penalty missed) Marais; (penalty missed) Devillechabrolle; (penalty missed) Onnis

Roazhon Park, Rennes
Attendance: 22,350
Referee: Alain Delmer

11 May 1982

Saint-Étienne (1)	2–0	Bastia (1)
Larios 38'; Platini 83'

Parc des Princes, Paris
Attendance: 46,242
Referee: Georges Konrath

== Final ==
15 May 1982

Paris Saint-Germain	2–2 (a.e.t.)	Saint-Étienne
Toko 58'; Rocheteau 120'		Platini 76', 99'
Penalties
Bathenay (penalty scored); Renaut (penalty scored); Rocheteau (penalty scored); Šurjak (penalty scored); Fernandez (penalty scored); Pilorget (penalty scored)	6–5	(penalty scored) Battiston; (penalty scored) Zanon; (penalty scored) Rep; (penalty scored) Larios; (penalty scored) Platini; (penalty missed) Lopez

Parc des Princes, Paris
Attendance: 46,160
Referee: Michel Vautrot
