= Éric Renaut =

French footballer (born 1954)

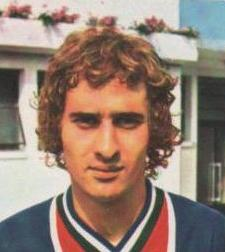
- Renaut with Paris Saint-Germain in the 1977–78 season

Personal information
- Date of birth: 11 April 1954 (age 72)
- Place of birth: Saint-Germain-en-Laye, France
- Height: 1.77 m (5 ft 10 in)
- Positions: Centre-back; midfielder

Youth career
- 1961–1970: Stade Saint-Germain
- 1970–1972: Paris Saint-Germain

Senior career*
Years	Team	Apps	(Gls)
1972–1982	Paris Saint-Germain	245	(31)
1975–1976	→ Sochaux (loan)	32	(6)
1982–1986	RC Paris	82	(9)
1986–1987	Sète	8	(1)
1987–1989	Red Star		
1989–1990	Chantilly		
Total		367+	(47+)

International career
- France Amateurs
- France Military
1975–1977	France U21	4	(0)
1978	France B	1	(0)

Managerial career
- Chantilly
- 1991–1996: Saint-Ouen-l'Aumône
- * Club domestic league appearances and goals

Éric Renaut (born 11 April 1954) is a French former professional footballer who played as a centre-back and midfielder. He spent the majority of his career at Paris Saint-Germain.

== Club career ==
Renaut was a product of the Paris Saint-Germain Academy. He had joined the club in 1970 after his hometown club of Stade Saint-Germain merged with Paris FC to create Paris Saint-Germain. Renaut's debuts for PSG's first team came in 1972, helping the club achieve promotion to the Division 2. Another successive promotion followed, with Renaut playing a key part again in the club's return to the Division 1.

Apart from a loan to Sochaux during the 1975–76 season, Renaut was a player of Paris Saint-Germain from 1972 to 1982. He left after having made 290 appearances and scored 35 goals for the club across all competitions, ranking as the player with the most appearances for PSG at the time of his departure. The 1981–82 Coupe de France was the only trophy he won with the Parisians.

Renaut continued his career at RC Paris, Sète, Red Star, and Chantilly before retiring in 1990.

== International career ==
Renaut represented France on many levels. He started as a youth international, then an amateur international, and also a military international. From 1975 to 1977, he played for the France U21s, also known as Les Espoirs (transl. The Hopes). With them, Renaut would win the 1977 Toulon Tournament.

Renaut also played one match for the France B team in 1978. He would additionally receive one call-up to the main national team, but he never made any appearances.

== Managerial career ==
Renaut's first managerial position came at the club he retired at, Chantilly. From 1991 to 1996, he coached Saint-Ouen-l'Aumône.

== After football ==
Later in his life, Renaut would become the manager of a sports equipment broadcasting company called ERD Diffusion. After this, he would create SMC, a sports communication company specialized in communicating over large sporting events.

Starting in 1999, Renaut began to work as a football agent in France for IMG, a company founded by Mark McCormack.

== Honours ==
France U21

- Toulon Tournament: 1977

Paris Saint-Germain

- Coupe de France: 1981–82

RC Paris

- Division 2: 1985–86
