= Christian Lopez (footballer) =

French footballer (born 1953)

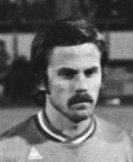
- Lopez in 1976

Personal information
- Date of birth: 15 March 1953 (age 73)
- Place of birth: Aïn Témouchent, Algeria
- Height: 1.77 m (5 ft 10 in)
- Position: Defender

Youth career
- 1968–1969: AS Rocheville
- 1969–1971: Saint-Étienne

Senior career*
| Years | Team | Apps | (Gls) |
| 1971–1982 | Saint-Étienne | 350 | (21) |
| 1982–1985 | Toulouse | 79 | (7) |
| 1985–1986 | Montpellier | 24 | (2) |
| 1986–1987 | Montélimar | | |
| Total | | 453 | (30) |

International career
| 1975–1982 | France | 39 | (1) |
- * Club domestic league appearances and goals

Christian Lopez (born 15 March 1953) is a French former professional footballer who played as a defender.

== Club career ==
Lopez was born in Aïn Témouchent, French Algeria. In a 15-year professional career, he amassed Ligue 1 totals of 429 games and 28 goals in representation of AS Saint-Étienne and Toulouse FC. He won seven major titles during his spell with the former club – including two doubles– and shared teams with legendary Michel Platini in his final three seasons.

Lopez spent the 1985–86 campaign in Ligue 2 with Montpellier HSC, retiring at the age of 34 after a spell in amateur football with UMS Montélimar. He later worked simultaneously as sporting director and assistant coach for Championnat National 3 side ES Cannet Rocheville.

== International career ==
Over seven years, Lopez earned 39 caps for the France national team and scored once. He made his debut on 26 March 1975, in a friendly against Hungary (2–0 win in Paris).

Lopez was part of the squads that appeared in the 1978 and 1982 FIFA World Cups. He featured in four matches for the Bleus in the latter tournament, with the country finishing in fourth position.

== Honours ==
Saint-Étienne

- Division 1: 1973–74, 1974–75, 1975–76, 1980–81
- Coupe de France: 1973–74, 1974–75, 1976–77; runner-up: 1980–81, 1981–82
- European Cup runner-up: 1975–76
