= Bruno Steck =

French footballer and manager (born 1957)

Personal information
- Date of birth: 22 September 1957 (age 69)
- Place of birth: Molsheim, France
- Height: 1.81 m (5 ft 11 in)
- Position: Defender

Team information
- Current team: Trélissac FC

Senior career*
Years	Team	Apps	(Gls)
1976–1979	Nantes	6	(0)
1979–1980	Angers	34	(1)
1980–1981	Rennes	31	(6)
1981–1983	Tours	73	(0)
1983–1985	Brest	67	(5)
1985–1988	Chamois Niortais FC	93	(5)
1988–1991	Laval	28	(0)

Managerial career
- 1992–1995: Dijon
- 1995–1996: Angers
- 1999–2002: Gap FC
- 2002–2004: FC Saintes
- 2004–2006: US Orléans
- 2008–: Trélissac FC
- * Club domestic league appearances and goals

Bruno Steck (born 22 September 1957) is a former French football player and manager. He has been managing Trélissac FC since 2008.
