= Jean-Louis Zanon =

French footballer

Personal information
- Date of birth: 30 November 1960 (age 65)
- Place of birth: Montauban, France
- Height: 1.78 m (5 ft 10 in)
- Position: Midfielder

Youth career
- 1977–1979: Saint-Étienne

Senior career*
Years	Team	Apps	(Gls)
1979–1984	Saint-Étienne	134	(23)
1984–1987	Marseille	72	(11)
1987–1989	Metz	71	(8)
1989–1991	Nîmes	53	(3)
1991–1993	Nancy	25	(0)

International career
1984	France Olympic team		
1983	France	1	(0)
Medal record
Men's football
Representing France
Gold medal – first place	1984 Los Angeles	Team competition
- * Club domestic league appearances and goals

Jean-Louis Zanon (born 30 November 1961, in Montauban) is a French former professional footballer who played as a midfielder. He was a member of the French squad that won the gold medal at the 1984 Summer Olympics in Los Angeles, California.
