= Dominique Rocheteau =

French footballer (born 1955)

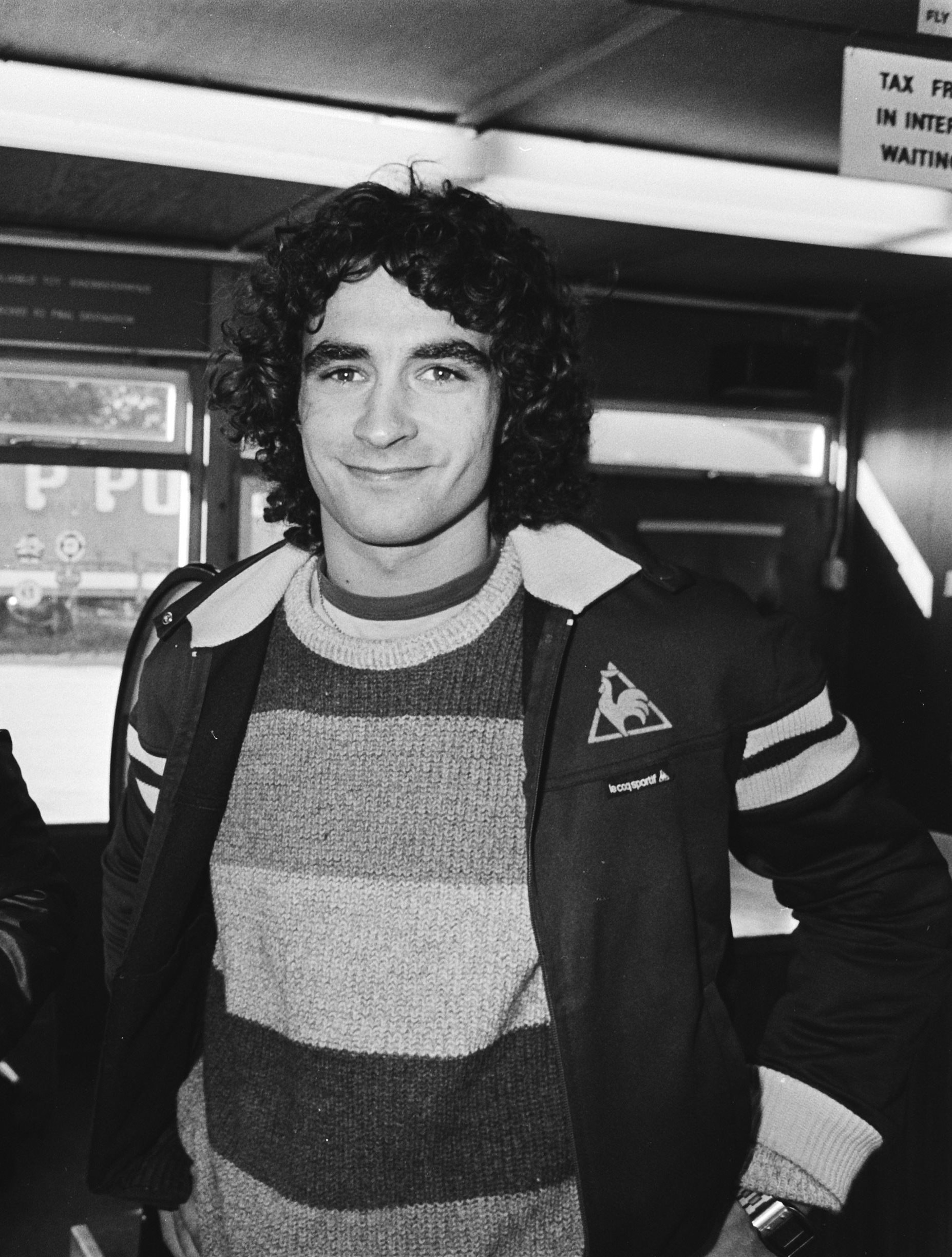
- Rocheteau with Saint-Étienne in 1979

Personal information
- Full name: Dominique Claude Rocheteau
- Date of birth: 14 January 1955 (age 71)
- Place of birth: Saintes, France
- Height: 1.77 m (5 ft 10 in)
- Position: Winger

Youth career
- La Rochelle
- Etaules

Senior career*
Years	Team	Apps	(Gls)
1972–1980	Saint-Étienne	153	(51)
1980–1987	Paris Saint-Germain	204	(83)
1987–1989	Toulouse	60	(13)
Total		417	(147)

International career
1975–1986	France	49	(15)

Managerial career
- 2010–2011: Saint-Étienne (president adviser)
- 2011–: Saint-Étienne (sporting director)
Medal record
Men's football
Representing France
FIFA World Cup
Third place	1986
UEFA European Championship
Winner	1984
CONMEBOL–UEFA Cup of Champions
Winner	1985
- * Club domestic league appearances and goals

Dominique Claude Rocheteau (born 14 January 1955) is a French former professional footballer who played as a winger. A French international, he played in three FIFA World Cups, scoring at least one goal in each of them, and was part of the team that won UEFA Euro 1984. At club level, he won four Division 1 titles, three Coupes de France and played in the 1976 European Cup Final.

== Club career ==
Born in Saintes, Charente-Maritime, Rocheteau began his professional career with AS Saint-Étienne, when they were the most successful and popular football team in France. He was a sinuous and incisive outside right who was nicknamed l'Ange Vert ("The Green Angel"). Injured, he played only the last eight minutes of the 1976 European Cup Final, which Saint-Étienne lost 1–0 to Bayern Munich. He won three Division 1 titles (1974–1976) and one Coupe de France () with Saint-Étienne. He transferred to Paris Saint-Germain in 1980 with whom he won one Division 1 title (1986) and two Coupes de France (1982–1983). In 1987, he was transferred to Toulouse FC, for whom he played two seasons before retiring in 1989.

Asked in 2012 about his most memorable football moment, Rocheteau cited his 107th-minute decisive goal in the second leg of the 1975–76 European Cup quarter-final against Dynamo Kyiv. Saint-Étienne had lost the first leg 2–0 but won the second leg 3–0 after extra-time. Dynamo Kyiv were the previous year's winners of the 1974–75 European Cup Winners' Cup.

== International career ==
With the France national football team, Rocheteau won 49 caps from 1975 to 1986 and scored 15 goals. He played in three FIFA World Cups, in 1978, 1982 and 1986, and was part of the team that won UEFA Euro 1984 (though Rocheteau missed the final due to injury).

Rocheteau played two matches and scored once at the 1978 World Cup, where France were eliminated in the group stage. Four years later in 1982, he played four matches and scored twice. He started for France in their semi-final defeat against West Germany, and successfully converted his penalty in the shoot-out. In 1986, Rocheteau scored only one goal but made four assists; he played four matches, including the quarter-final against Brazil (he was injured and substituted during that match in extra-time and hence did not partake in the penalty shootout), but did not play in the semi-final against West Germany.

== Personal and later life ==
Rocheteau grew up in Étaules, Charente-Maritime where his father and grandfather ran an oyster farm. The business was later taken over by his brother Antony.

After his retirement, Rocheteau shortly became a sports agent, working for David Ginola and Reynald Pedros. In 2002, he became head of the National Ethics Committee of the French Football Federation. He joined the Saint-Étienne staff in 2010, and has since held various management positions in the club.

Away from football, Rocheteau has been noted for his far-left views, and has been associated with the Ligue communiste révolutionnaire and Lutte Ouvrière. In 1995, he played a supporting fictional character in Maurice Pialat's film Le Garçu, starring Gérard Depardieu. He has appeared in a few other movies, TV shows and commercials.

== Career statistics ==
=== Club ===
Appearances and goals by club, season and competition
Club	Season	League			National Cup		Europe		Total	
Club	Season	Division	Apps	Goals	Apps	Goals	Apps	Goals	Apps	Goals
Saint-Étienne	1972–73	Division 1	2	0	0	0	—		2	0
Saint-Étienne	1973–74	Division 1	4	0	2	1	—		6	1
Saint-Étienne	1974–75	Division 1	4	0	1	0	—		5	0
Saint-Étienne	1975–76	Division 1	22	11	1	0	8	3	31	14
Saint-Étienne	1976–77	Division 1	27	3	7	0	6	0	40	3
Saint-Étienne	1977–78	Division 1	26	5	1	0	2	0	29	5
Saint-Étienne	1978–79	Division 1	37	21	5	0	—		42	21
Saint-Étienne	1979–80	Division 1	31	11	6	1	5	0	42	12
Saint-Étienne	Total		153	51	23	2	21	3	197	56
Paris Saint-Germain	1980–81	Division 1	37	16	3	2	—		40	18
Paris Saint-Germain	1981–82	Division 1	22	10	8	6	—		30	16
Paris Saint-Germain	1982–83	Division 1	26	11	9	3	3	0	38	14
Paris Saint-Germain	1983–84	Division 1	30	9	1	0	3	0	34	9
Paris Saint-Germain	1984–85	Division 1	31	15	10	2	3	3	44	20
Paris Saint-Germain	1985–86	Division 1	35	19	7	1	—		42	20
Paris Saint-Germain	1986–87	Division 1	23	3	2	0	2	0	27	3
Paris Saint-Germain	Total		204	83	40	14	11	3	255	100
Toulouse	1987–88	Division 1	26	6	4	1	4	2	34	9
Toulouse	1988–89	Division 1	34	7	2	0	—		36	7
Toulouse	Total		60	13	6	1	4	2	70	16
Career total			417	147	69	17	36	8	522	172

=== International ===
Appearances and goals by national team and year
National team	Year	Apps	Goals
France	1975	3	0
France	1976	2	0
France	1977	4	2
France	1978	5	1
France	1979	2	0
France	1980	2	0
France	1981	4	1
France	1982	6	2
France	1983	6	3
France	1984	5	1
France	1985	4	4
France	1986	6	1
Total		49	15

List of international goals scored by Dominique Rocheteau
No.	Date	Venue	Opponent	Score	Result	Competition
1.	23 April 1977	Charmilles Stadium, Geneva, Switzerland	Switzerland	3–0	4–0	Friendly
2.	16 November 1977	Parc des Princes, Paris, France	Bulgaria	1–0	3–1	1978 FIFA World Cup qualification
3.	10 June 1978	Estadio José María Minella, Mar del Plata, Argentina	Hungary	3–1	3–1	1978 FIFA World Cup
4.	5 December 1981	Parc des Princes, Paris, France	Cyprus	1–0	4–0	1982 FIFA World Cup qualification
5.	4 July 1982	Vicente Calderón, Madrid, Spain	Northern Ireland	2–0	4–1	1982 FIFA World Cup
6.	4 July 1982	Vicente Calderón, Madrid, Spain	Northern Ireland	3–0	4–1	1982 FIFA World Cup
7.	23 April 1983	Parc des Princes, Paris, France	Yugoslavia	2–0	4–0	Friendly
8.	23 April 1983	Parc des Princes, Paris, France	Yugoslavia	3–0	4–0	Friendly
9.	5 October 1983	Parc des Princes, Paris, France	Spain	1–0	1–1	Friendly
10.	28 March 1984	Stade du Parc Lescure, Bordeaux, France	Austria	1–0	1–0	Friendly
11.	21 August 1985	Parc des Princes, Paris, France	Uruguay	1–0	2–0	1985 Artemio Franchi Cup
12.	30 October 1985	Parc des Princes, Paris, France	Luxembourg	1–0	6–0	1986 FIFA World Cup qualification
13.	30 October 1985	Parc des Princes, Paris, France	Luxembourg	3–0	6–0	1986 FIFA World Cup qualification
14.	30 October 1985	Parc des Princes, Paris, France	Luxembourg	6–0	6–0	1986 FIFA World Cup qualification
15.	9 June 1986	Estadio Nou Camp, León, Mexico	Hungary	3–0	3–0	1986 FIFA World Cup

== Honours ==
Saint-Étienne

- Division 1: 1973–74, 1974–75, 1975–76
- Coupe de France: 1976–77
- European Cup runner-up: 1975–76

Paris Saint-Germain

- Division 1: 1985–86
- Coupe de France: 1981–82, 1982–83

France

- UEFA European Championship: 1984
- Artemio Franchi Trophy: 1985

Individual

- Onze de Bronze: 1976
- Onze Mondial: 1976
