= Luis Fernandez =

French association football player and manager (born 1959)

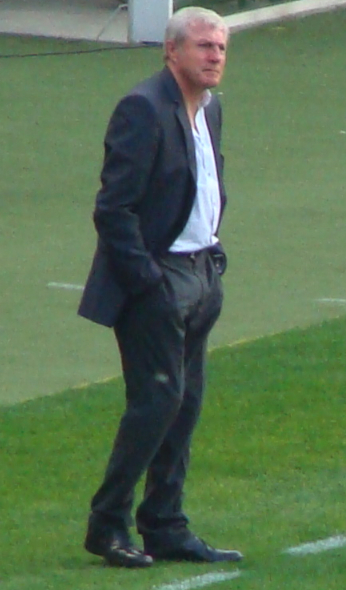
- Fernandez in 2009

Personal information
- Full name: Luis Miguel Fernández Toledo
- Date of birth: 2 October 1959 (age 67)
- Place of birth: Tarifa, Spain
- Height: 1.78 m (5 ft 10 in)
- Position: Defensive midfielder

Youth career
- 1968–1970: AS Minguettes
- 1970–1978: Saint-Priest

Senior career*
Years	Team	Apps	(Gls)
1978–1986	Paris Saint-Germain	225	(30)
1986–1989	RC Paris	59	(3)
1989–1993	Cannes	93	(5)
Total		377	(38)

International career
1982–1992	France	60	(6)

Managerial career
- 1992–1994: Cannes
- 1994–1996: Paris Saint-Germain
- 1996–2000: Athletic Bilbao
- 2000–2003: Paris Saint-Germain
- 2003–2004: Espanyol
- 2005: Al-Rayyan
- 2005–2006: Beitar Jerusalem
- 2006–2007: Real Betis
- 2008–2009: Reims
- 2010–2011: Israel
- 2015–2016: Guinea
Medal record
Men's football
Representing France
FIFA World Cup
Third place	1986
UEFA European Championship
Winner	1984
CONMEBOL–UEFA Cup of Champions
Winner	1985 France
- * Club domestic league appearances and goals

Luis Miguel Fernández Toledo (born 2 October 1959), known as Luis Fernandez, is a former professional football manager and player who played as a defensive midfielder.

Fernandez spent most of his playing career for Paris Saint-Germain. He earned 60 international caps and scored 6 goals for the France national team between 1982 and 1992, and was part of their teams that won UEFA Euro 1984 and came third at the 1986 FIFA World Cup.

Fernandez managed PSG in two spells, winning several domestic and European honours. He also managed Cannes and Reims in France, and Athletic Bilbao, Espanyol and Real Betis in La Liga.

== Playing career ==
=== Club career ===
Fernandez was born in Tarifa, Spain, and moved to France with his parents at age nine. He began playing football at the AS Minguettes and became a naturalized French citizen in 1981. He signed his first professional contract at age 19 with Paris Saint-Germain.

After the elimination from the 1986 FIFA World Cup, and just after he had won the Division 1 championship with PSG, Fernandez made the decision to join Jean-Luc Lagardère's team Racing Club de Paris. However, in spite of a team that was strong on paper, the club and Fernandez did not succeed, and he left Racing after three seasons.

From Racing, Fernandez joined Cannes in 1989, a more modest club. At club level, Cannes was relegated to Ligue 2 at the end of the 1991–92 season, but Fernandez decided to remain with the club and end his career when his contract expired. A few weeks, however, Cannes named Fernandez its manager, and so he finished the season as player-manager, leading Cannes back to Division 1 at the end of the season. He then retired from playing professionally to become a full-time manager.

=== International career ===
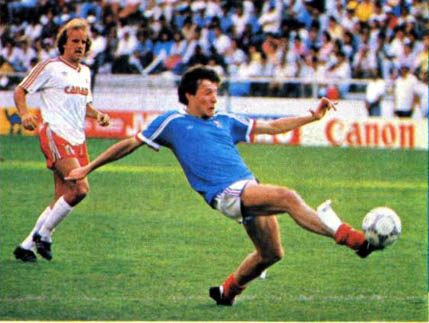
Fernandez playing for France at the 1986 FIFA World Cup

Fernandez quickly established himself as an expert in winning the ball, but also capable of precise passing, and at the end of 1982, he was called up for the France national team and debuted against the Netherlands on 10 November 1982. At age 23, Fernandez was immediately an important part of the team that only months earlier had been semi-finalists of the 1982 FIFA World Cup. He formed the national midfield with such France national team greats as Jean Tigana in the central midfield, and the offensive players Alain Giresse and Michel Platini, a midfield that became known as the "magic square". With the national team, Fernandez won UEFA Euro 1984 at home in France, and reached the semi-final of the 1986 World Cup in Mexico.

Fernandez was still a part of the France national team in spite of a declining physique. Not a starting player under new national team manager Michel Platini, Fernandez would play the role of a late joker, with the job to clinch a result at the end of the match and successfully helped France to overcome Spain, the country of his birth, to qualify for the UEFA Euro 1992. Fernandez took part in Euro 1992, where France were eliminated in the group stage, and Fernandez decided to end his international career.

== Managerial career ==
=== Cannes ===
After Cannes' promotion to Division 1, Fernandez continued his work at the club and led it to UEFA Cup qualification. He was named Manager of the Year at the end of the 1993–94 season, on grounds of Fernandez's alluring philosophy of offensive tactics with a use of young players. The profile of Fernandez particularly interested Paris Saint-Germain. Despite winning Division 1 and having a good run in the UEFA Champions League, PSG failed to play attractive football, partly because of Portuguese manager Artur Jorge, who applied a more rigid strategic system. The board of PSG saw in Fernandez the ideal manager to reform the image of the club.

=== Paris Saint-Germain ===
In the 1994–95 UEFA Champions League, Fernandez's PSG reached the semi-finals by eliminating an FC Barcelona side led by Johan Cruyff. In the same year, his team also picked up the Coupe de France against RC Strasbourg and the Coupe de la Ligue against SC Bastia. Despite then losing David Ginola and George Weah, PSG won their first European honour, the 1995–96 UEFA Cup Winners' Cup against Rapid Vienna.

=== Athletic Bilbao ===
Fernandez had four seasons in charge of Athletic Bilbao in Spain's La Liga from 1996 to 2000. In 1997–98, he led the team to UEFA Champions League qualification as runners-up to Barcelona.

=== Return to Paris Saint-Germain ===
After turning down the vacant position at rivals Olympique de Marseille the previous month, Fernandez returned to PSG in December 2000, succeeding the sacked Philippe Bergeroo at the 12th-placed club. By finishing 9th, the team qualified for the 2001 UEFA Intertoto Cup, and won the final on the away goals rule against Brescia.

In March 2003, after the decline from a good start that saw PSG top in October, Fernandez announced that he would retire at the end of the season. In the game before the announcement, his club won Le Classique 3–0 at Marseille's Stade Velodrome.

=== Espanyol ===
On 4 November 2003, Fernandez was hired by Espanyol, who were situated in last place in the league table with five points from ten games, and had sacked Javier Clemente. He saved them from relegation with a 2–0 home win over Real Murcia in the final game of the season, with both goals in the last 20 minutes.

=== Al-Rayyan & Beitar Jerusalem ===
In 2005, Fernandez was briefly in charge of Al-Rayyan of the Qatar Stars League before switching to Israel's Beitar Jerusalem in November. He took the team to third place and UEFA Cup qualification in his only season.

=== Real Betis ===
Fernandez joined Real Betis midway through the 2006–07 La Liga season and Betis' centenary season. However, he was released on 10 June 2007 following a 5–0 loss at the Estadio Manuel Ruiz de Lopera to Osasuna with just one match remaining in Betis' relegation threatened season. Including Copa del Rey matches, Fernandez led Betis for 26 matches, winning 5, drawing 16 and losing 7. His tenure lasted from 27 December 2006 to 10 June 2007.

=== Stade de Reims ===
Fernandez joined Stade de Reims halfway through the 2008–09 season. Reims were playing in Ligue 2, the second tier of French football, but Fernandez was unable to avoid relegation. He was replaced in June 2009 by Marc Collat.

=== Israel ===
On 21 March 2010, Fernandez was appointed manager of the Israel national team on an 18-month contract effective 1 May. He vowed to only have Israelis on his coaching team. The following February, he was suspended for an outstanding debt to Al-Rayyan. In December 2011, his contract was allowed to expire after failure to qualify for UEFA Euro 2012, and Eli Guttman succeeded him.

=== Guinea ===
On 29 April 2015, Fernandez signed a 20-month contract with the Guinea national team, with the option of an extension. He left by mutual consent on 24 May 2016, due to disputes within the Guinean Football Federation.

== Honours ==
=== Player ===
Paris Saint-Germain

- French Division 1: 1985–86
- Coupe de France: 1981–82, 1982–83

France

- UEFA European Championship: 1984
- Artemio Franchi Cup: 1985

Individual

- French Player of the Year: 1985
- Étoile d'Or: 1986
- World XI: 1986, 1987

=== Manager ===
Paris Saint-Germain

- Coupe de France: 1994–95
- Coupe de la Ligue: 1994–95
- Trophée des Champions: 1995
- UEFA Cup Winners' Cup: 1995–96
- UEFA Intertoto Cup: 2001
