= Dominique Bathenay =

French footballer (born 1954)

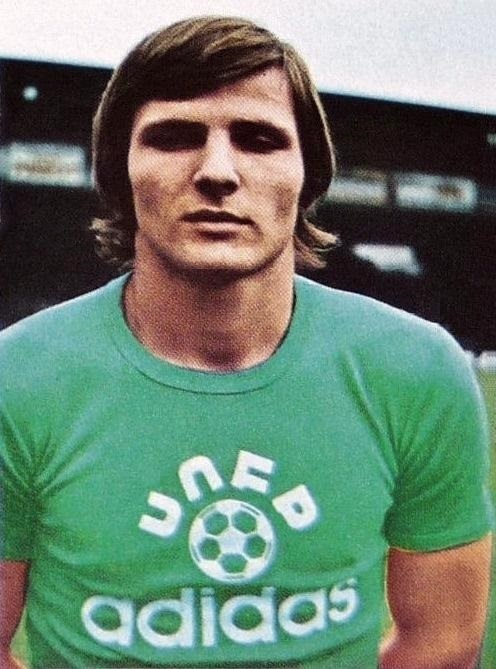
- Bathenay in 1974

Personal information
- Date of birth: 13 February 1954 (age 72)
- Place of birth: Pont-d'Ain, France
- Height: 1.81 m (5 ft 11 in)
- Position: Midfielder

Youth career
- 1971–1973: Saint-Étienne

Senior career*
Years	Team	Apps	(Gls)
1973–1978	Saint-Étienne	158	(25)
1978–1985	Paris Saint-Germain	230	(31)
1985–1987	Sète	64	(2)
Total		472	(58)

International career
1975–1982	France	20	(4)

Managerial career
- 1987–1988: Sète
- 1988–1989: Reims
- 1989–1990: US Monastir
- 1990–1994: Choisy-le-Roi
- 1996: Saint-Étienne
- 2000–2001: Nîmes
- 2002: Seychelles
- 2003–2004: Sedan
- 2005–2008: United Arab Emirates (assistant coach)
- 2008–2009: United Arab Emirates
- * Club domestic league appearances and goals

Dominique Bathenay (born 13 February 1954) is a French former professional football player and coach.

== Career ==
A midfielder, Bathenay played for Saint-Étienne from 1973 to 1978, and for Paris Saint-Germain from 1978 to 1985.

He was a member of the French squad that competed at the 1978 FIFA World Cup. He obtained a total number of twenty international caps for the France national team, scoring four goals, in the years 1975-1982.

== Honours ==
Saint-Étienne

- Ligue 1: 1974, 1975, 1976
- Coupe de France: 1974, 1975, 1977

Paris Saint-Germain

- Coupe de France: 1982, 1983
