= Paris Saint-Germain FC supporters =

Supporters of Paris Saint-Germain FC

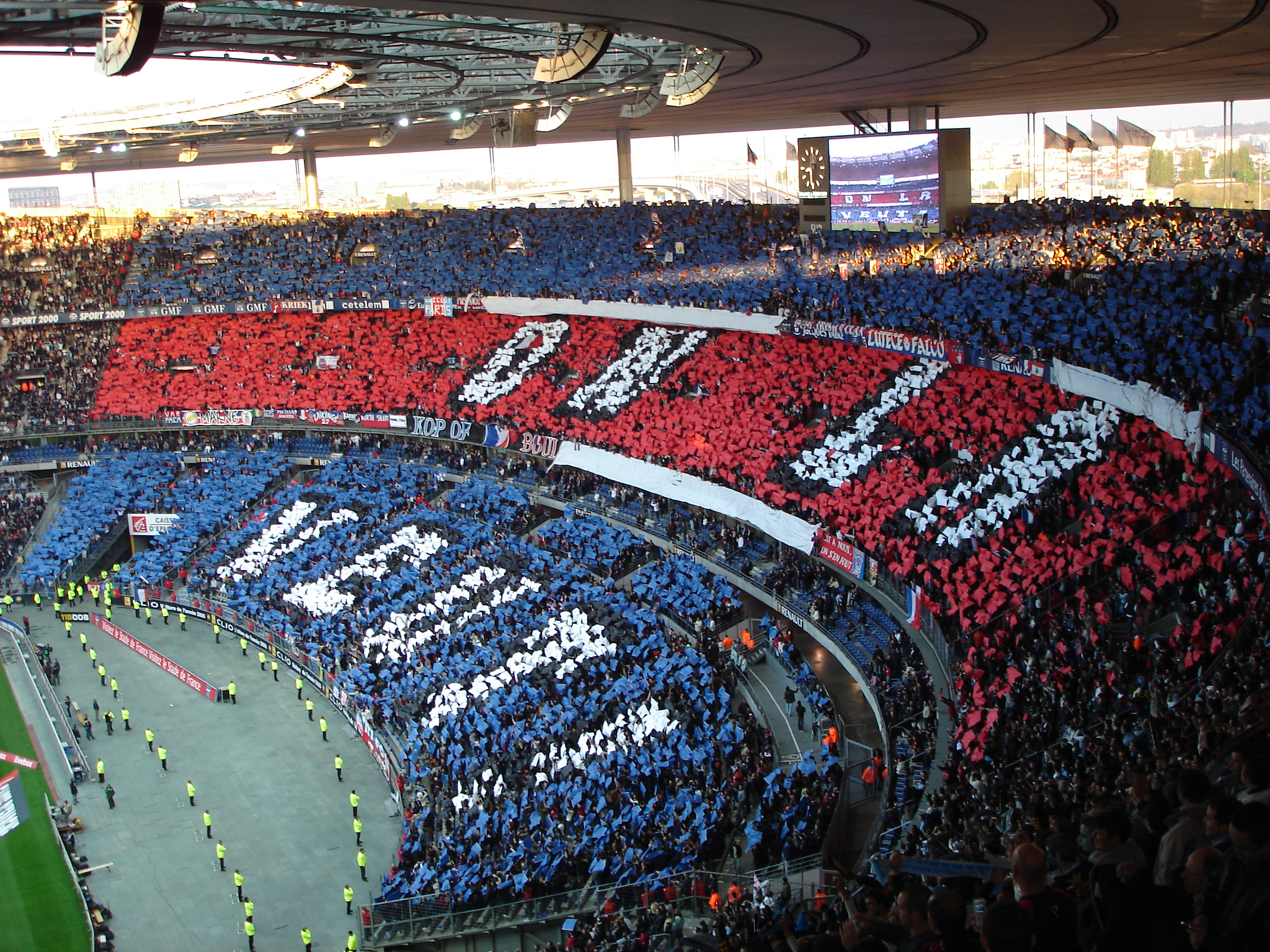
PSG fans at the 2006 French Cup final.

Paris Saint-Germain FC are the most popular football club in France and one of the most widely followed teams in the world. Its home ground, the Parc des Princes has hosted the team since July 1974. The stadium is divided into four main stands: Tribune Auteuil, Tribune Paris, Tribune Borelli, and Tribune Boulogne. Historically, the Auteuil and Boulogne stands—better known as the Virage Auteuil (VA) and the Kop of Boulogne (KoB)—have been the strongholds of PSG's ultras, making the Parc one of the most intimidating venues in Europe and renowned for its electric atmosphere. Meanwhile, more family-friendly and welcoming fan groups typically gather in the Paris and Borelli stands, including the club's first supporters' group, Les Amis du PSG, which was founded in 1975.

Lacking a large and passionate following in its early years, the club began offering cheaper season tickets to young fans in 1976. These supporters were placed in Kop K, located in the Blue K Section of the Paris stand at the Parc des Princes. After ticket prices increased, the Kop K fans moved to the Boulogne stand in 1978, giving rise to the Kop of Boulogne. The club's first Italian-style ultra group, the Boulogne Boys, was founded there in 1985, followed by the English-inspired kopistes Gavroches and Rangers. However, some KoB groups, including Commando Pirate and Casual Firm, took English hooligans as questionable role models, and violence escalated rapidly.

In response, the club's owners, Canal+, encouraged non-violent KoB fans to gather at the opposite end of the stadium, leading to the creation of the Virage Auteuil in 1991. This section was spearheaded by the ultra groups Supras Auteuil, Lutece Falco, and Tigris Mystic. The initiative initially succeeded, but a violent, racially charged rivalry gradually developed between the two stands. Tensions peaked in 2010, before a match against Olympique de Marseille, when Boulogne fan Yann Lorence was killed following a brawl outside the Parc between supporters from both stands. This tragedy prompted PSG president Robin Leproux to implement the Plan Leproux, which exiled all supporter groups from the Parc and banned them from away matches. After former VA supporters formed the Collectif Ultras Paris (CUP) in May 2016, the club allowed their return in October of the same year.

Based in Auteuil, the CUP are currently the only ultra group officially recognized by the club. PSG allowed the CUP to take over the Boulogne stand starting in the 2025–26 season. They share the stadium with other licensed groups: Hoolicool, Vikings 27, and Handicap PSG in the Paris stand; and Les Amis du PSG, Titi Fosi, and PSG Grand Sud in the Borelli stand. In the past, PSG also recognized Supras Auteuil, Lutece Falco, and Tigris Mystic from Auteuil; Boulogne Boys, Gavroches, and Rangers from Boulogne; and Authentiks, Puissance Paris, and Brigade Paris from Paris. The hooligan firm Karsud remains active but has been banned from all PSG matches since 2017.

== Supporters' groups ==
As of 21 September 2026.

=== Active ===
- Tribune Auteuil / Boulogne
  - Collectif Ultras Paris (2016)
    - Subgroups:
      - K-Soce Team (2006)
      - Le Combat Continue (2011)
      - Urban Paris (2017)
      - Beriz Crew (2023)
- Tribune Paris
  - Hoolicool (1993)
  - Vikings 27 (2001)
  - Handicap PSG (2005)
- Tribune Borelli
  - Les Amis du PSG (1975)
  - Titi Fosi (1995)
  - PSG Grand Sud (1995)
- Banned from club matches
  - Karsud (1994)
  - Parias Cohortis (2013)
  - Block Parisii (2017)

=== Dissolved ===
- Tribune Auteuil
  - Auteuil Fanatics (1989–1992)
  - Supras Auteuil (1991–2010)
  - Lutece Falco (1991–2010)
  - Dragons (1993–1997)
  - Tigris Mystic (1993–2006)
  - Titans (1993–2010)
  - Kriek (1999–2010)
  - Microbes Paris (2006–2017)
  - Grinta Paris (2008–2010)
  - Lista Nera Paris (2014–2017)
  - Liberte Pour les Abonnés (2010–2023)
  - Nautecia (2012–2023)
  - Ferveur Parisienne (2019–2022)
- Tribune Paris
  - Authentiks (2002–2010)
  - Puissance Paris (2003–2010)
  - Brigade Paris (2007–2011)
- Tribune Boulogne
  - Boulogne Boys (1985–2008)
  - Gavroches (1986–2008)
  - Commando Pirate (1986–1994)
  - Firebirds (1986–1993)
  - Pitbull Kop (1989–1992)
  - Headhunters (1989–1992)
  - PSG Assas Club (1989–2010)
  - Army Korps (1991–1993)
  - Rangers (1992–2010)
  - Casual Firm (1993–2010)
  - Section Cigogne (1996–2010)
  - Layache Family (2001–2010)
  - Commando Loubard (2003–2010)
  - Milice Paris (2006–2010)
  - Tifo e Stupido (2009–2010)
  - Paname Rebirth (2019–2021)
  - Resistance Parisienne (2019–2023)

== Fan culture ==
=== Popularity and demographics ===
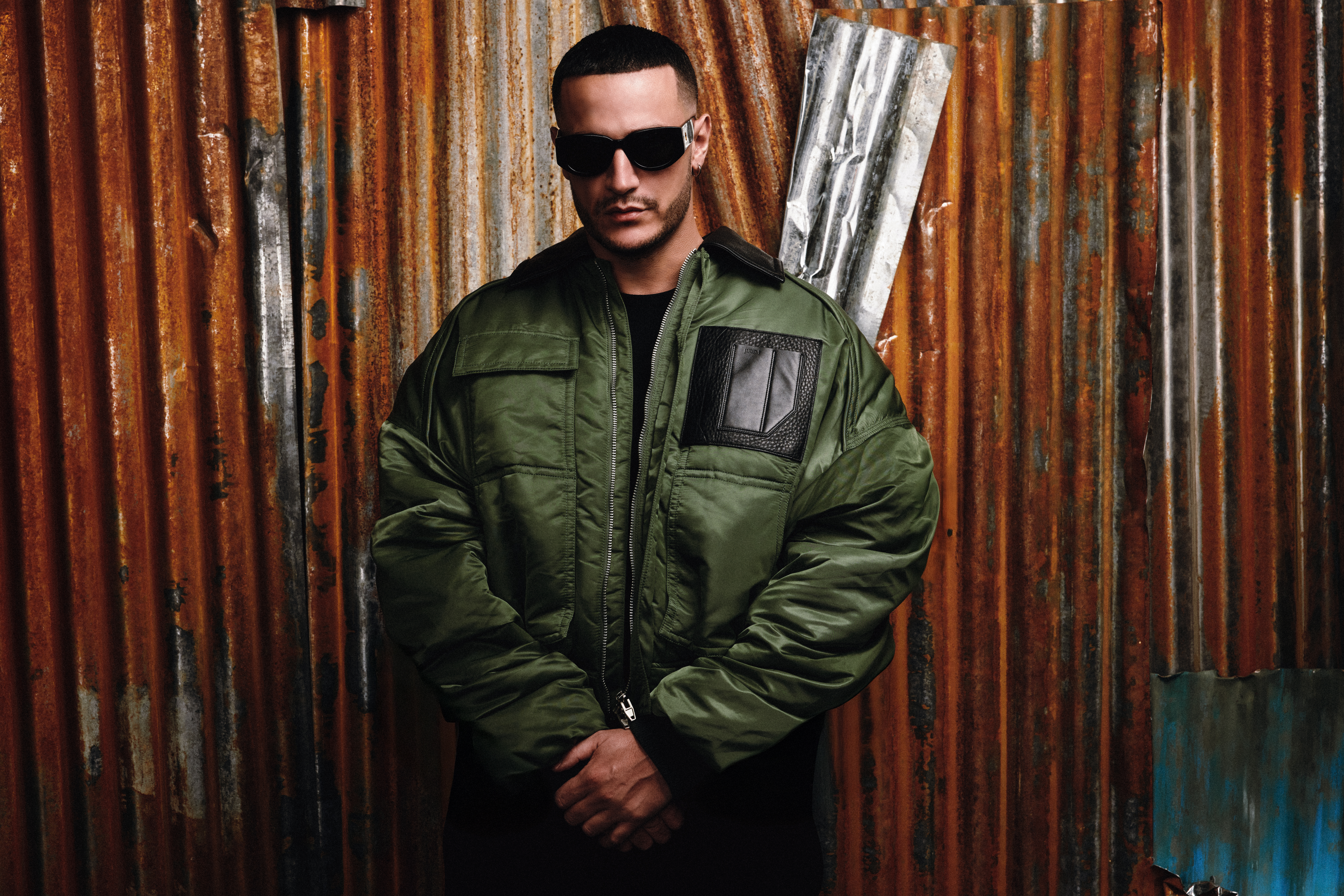
DJ Snake is one of the club's most famous fans.

According to a survey conducted by the Ligue de Football Professionnel (LFP), Paris Saint-Germain FC are the most popular football club in France, representing 22% of the national fan base, ahead of Olympique de Marseille with 20% and Olympique Lyonnais with 14%. With an estimated 35 million supporters worldwide, PSG are also among the most widely supported football clubs globally.

French record producer DJ Snake is one of the club's most prominent supporters. Other notable fans of PSG include former French president Nicolas Sarkozy, actors Jamel Debbouze and Michaël Youn, American singer Justin Timberlake, judo world champion Teddy Riner, singer Patrick Bruel, rapper Booba, NBA champion Tony Parker, and television presenter Cécile de Ménibus.

The Parisians rank fourth among the top 100 football clubs by social media following, according to a ranking compiled by the International Centre for Sports Studies. The ranking covers platforms including Twitter, Instagram, Facebook, and TikTok. With a combined total of 199.4 million followers, PSG trail the top three clubs: Real Madrid, Barcelona, and Manchester United. Other French clubs featured in the ranking include Marseille, Monaco, Lyon, and Lille.

PSG, who play their home matches at the Parc des Princes, are ranked second among European football clubs in terms of revenue earned from ticket sales. According to a ranking compiled by UEFA, PSG generated approximately €6.7 million in ticket revenue, placing them behind Real Madrid, which led the list with about €7.9 million. Marseille was the only other French team included in the ranking, placing 15th with approximately €3.1 million in ticket revenue.

The Parc des Princes comprises four main stands: Auteuil, Paris, Borelli, and Boulogne. Historically, the Virage Auteuil (VA) and the Kop of Boulogne (KoB) have been home to the club's most fervent supporters. During the 1970s and 1980s, the PSG fan base was predominantly white and gathered in the KoB, which included far-right and white supremacist elements. In the 1990s, the VA became home to white fans opposed to the KoB's racism, as well as Black and Arab groups, fostering a racially mixed, left-wing, and anti-racist identity that reflected the diversity of Parisian society. Racial tensions between the two stands escalated into violent conflicts during the 2000s, prompting the club to implement an anti-violence plan that expelled all supporters' groups from the stadium in 2010. PSG later permitted their return as a single multiethnic collective to Auteuil in 2016, followed by Boulogne in 2025.

=== Anthems and mottos ===
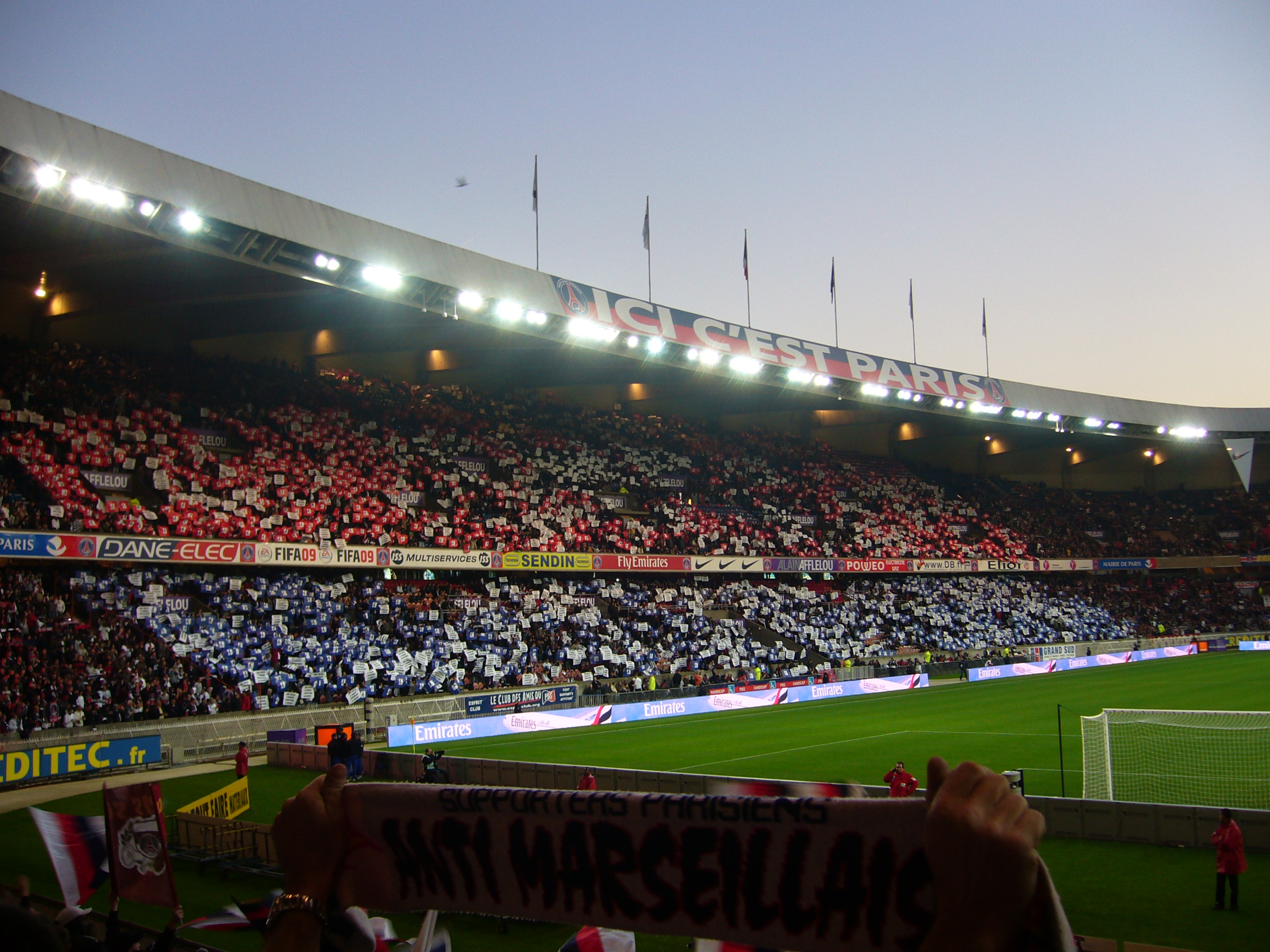
"Ici, c'est Paris" is a very famous PSG motto.

"Allez Paris!", recorded by Belgian actress and singer Annie Cordy in 1971, was the club's first official anthem. A dedicated PSG supporter from the very beginning, Cordy was part of an association of hundreds of celebrities who contributed to the club's founding in 1970. At that time, an appeal was made to the public to purchase season tickets at newsstands. A year later, Cordy was named PSG's official godmother and recorded the aforementioned anthem.

The club's second anthem, "Allez Paris‑Saint‑Germain!" by Les Parisiens, was recorded in 1977, replacing Annie Cordy's original version. It was produced and released by long-time PSG leader and music producer Charles Talar. The chorus became a popular chant among PSG fans during matches. A new version of the anthem, retaining the same title, was recorded in 2010 as part of the club's 40th anniversary celebrations. Performed to the tune of "Go West" by Village People, the lyrics were rewritten with input from the fans. This version serves as the club's current official anthem.

"Ô Ville Lumière," set to the tune of "Flower of Scotland," is another official club anthem for PSG fans. This chant was created by the former KoB ultra group Boulogne Boys. Other notable chants include "Le Parc est à nous" ("The Parc is ours"), "Ici, c'est Paris" ("This is Paris"), and "Paris est magique" ("Paris is magical"). "Who Said I Would" by English musician Phill Collins is also a traditional fan anthem. The song has accompanied the players' entrance onto the field since 1992. Collins was preceded by French singer Michel Fugain and his 1972 song "Attention, Ladies and Gentlemen."

"Ici, c'est Paris" and "Paris est magique" are also the club's most iconic mottos. The "Ici, c'est Paris" slogan was created by the former VA ultra group Supras Auteuil, which registered it as a trademark in 2008. PSG began incorporating the slogan into their marketing, resulting in a legal dispute with the Supras. In February 2016, the group rejected the club's offer of €2,000 for the rights to the slogan. An agreement was reached in August 2019, allowing the club to continue using the slogan in advertising while fans retained the right to use it freely.

"Allez Paris!"
(First Official Anthem)

[Chorus]
Allez, allez Paris!
Ton équipe est la plus forte,
En avant, les gars te portent
Tous dans un seul cri:
Allez F.C. Paris
Droit au but va notre espoir,
Nous voulons ce soir
Te fêter Paris!
[Verse 1]
À Belleville,
Ils sont mille
Qui s'appellent Mimille.
À Pantin,
Y en a plein
Qu'on appelle Tintin.
À Versailles,
Y a des ouailles
Qui s'appellent Noaille
À Vincennes,
À Suresnes,
Faut chercher Gégène.
Mais ici,
Réunis,
On crie
De Saint-Germain à Bercy:
[Chorus]
Allez, allez Paris!
Ton équipe est la plus forte,
En avant, les gars te portent
Tous dans un seul cri:
Allez F.C. Paris
Droit au but va notre espoir,
Nous voulons ce soir
Te fêter Paris!
[Verse 2]
Dans l'équipe,
Tous nos types
Feraient un malheur,
Quand sur eux,
Rouge ou bleu
Blanc sont nos couleurs!
Les aînés
Déchaînes
Donnent la cadence
D'un beau jeu,
Clair, joyeux
D'attaque et défense.
Et soudain,
Cet entrain
Fait jaillir mille fois ce refrain:
[Chorus]
Allez, allez Paris!
Ton équipe est la plus forte,
En avant, les gars te portent
Tous dans un seul cri:
Allez F.C. Paris
Droit au but va notre espoir,
Nous voulons ce soir
Te fêter Paris!
Te fêter Paris!

— Annie Cordy, 1971
"Allez Paris-Saint-Germain!"
(Second Official Anthem)

[Chorus]
Allez Paris-Saint-Germain!
Allez Paris-Saint-Germain!
Chantez Paris-Saint-Germain!
Allez les Parisiens!
[Verse 1]
Au temps où nos idoles étaient chanteurs
On portait leurs noms écrits sur nos cœurs
Les salles étaient pleines à craquer
Au temps passé!
Mai sun jour nos disques se sont usés
Et Paris-Saint-Germain est arrivé
Trois lettres sont restées gravées: le PSG
[Chorus]
Allez Paris-Saint-Germain!
Allez Paris-Saint-Germain!
Chantez Paris-Saint-Germain!
Allez les Parisiens!
Allez Paris-Saint-Germain!
Allez Paris-Saint-Germain!
Chantez Paris-Saint-Germain!
Allez les Parisiens!
[Verse 2]
Aujourd'hui nos idoles sont footballeurs
Des coupes, ils sortiront les vainqueurs
Tous, on va les encourager
Ils nous font vibrer
Bientôt le Parc sera trop petit
Pour y recevoir nos équipes amies
Très fort, il nous faudra crier:
Vive PSG!
[Chorus]
Allez Paris-Saint-Germain!
Allez Paris-Saint-Germain!
Chantez Paris-Saint-Germain!
Allez les Parisiens!
Allez Paris-Saint-Germain!
Allez Paris-Saint-Germain!
Chantez Paris-Saint-Germain!
Allez PSG, allez Paris, Paris-Saint-Germain!

— Les Parisiens, 1977
"Allez Paris-Saint-Germain!"
(Current Official Anthem)

[Verse 1]
PSG, ton nom nous unis
PSG, ici c’est Paris
Tous ensemble, le cœur à jamais
Rouge et bleu, pour le PSG
[Chorus]
Allez Paris-Saint-Germain!
Allez Paris-Saint-Germain!
Allez Paris-Saint-Germain!
Allez Paris-Saint-Germain!
[Verse 2]
PSG, le Parc est mythique
PSG, Paris est magique
Tous ensemble, unis pour gagner
Rouge et bleu, pour le PSG
[Chorus]
Allez Paris-Saint-Germain!
Allez Paris-Saint-Germain!
Allez Paris-Saint-Germain!
Allez Paris-Saint-Germain!
Allez Paris-Saint-Germain!
Allez Paris-Saint-Germain!
Allez Paris-Saint-Germain!
Allez Paris-Saint-Germain!

— Paris Saint-Germain, 2010
"Ô Ville Lumière"
(PSG Supporters Anthem)

[Verse 1]
Ô Ville Lumière
Sens la chaleur
De notre cœur
Vois-tu notre ferveur
Quand nous marchons près de toi
Dans cette quête, chasser l'ennemi
Enfin pour que nos couleurs
Brillent encore
[Verse 2]
Ô Ville Lumière
Ville championne
Par la manière
Que les clairons sonnent
Que batte son cœur pour nos couleurs
Que batte son coeur
Pour chaque victoire
Et ses joueurs
Couverts de gloire

— Boulogne Boys, 1990s

=== Friendships with other fans ===
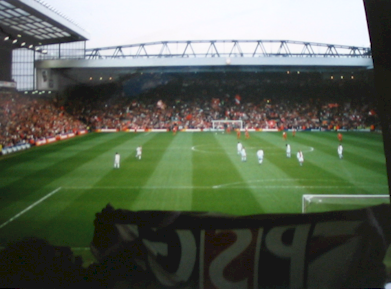
PSG supporters at Anfield in 1997.

Supporters of Paris Saint-Germain maintain friendly relationships, known as twinnings, with fans of other clubs. Both the Auteuil and Boulogne stands hold Celtic and Liverpool supporters in high regard, as both clubs are considered influential within the European ultra movement. Celtic's visual style notably inspired Auteuil, while Boulogne's history has often been compared to that of Liverpool. Celtic and Liverpool fans also share several traditions, most prominently the anthem "You'll Never Walk Alone."

PSG hosted Celtic in the UEFA Cup Winners' Cup in October 1995. At the end of the match, Celtic fans applauded the Auteuil ultras, who responded by chanting "Celtic! Celtic! Celtic!". The two clubs met again in the UEFA Champions League (UCL) in September 2017. After the final whistle at Celtic Park, the CUP repeated the chant, while Celtic fans congratulated them on their victory. In the return leg in Paris, PSG ultras displayed a large banner reading "You'll Never Walk Alone."

When Liverpool faced PSG in the semi-finals of the Cup Winners' Cup at the Parc des Princes in April 1997, Auteuil unveiled a banner reading "Welcome to the Legendary Fans." Liverpool's anthem, "You'll Never Walk Alone," was observed respectfully by both Parisian stands during the match. PSG and Liverpool met again in the Champions League in September 2018. After the match, Liverpool supporters applauded the approximately 2,500 Parisian ultras from the CUP.

In 2003, Supras Auteuil established a twinning with the Köln ultra group Wilde Horde 96, which continued to pay tribute to Supras following their dissolution in 2010. During a home match in October 2018, Wilde Horde 96 displayed a banner reading "25 Years of Ultra Mentality" to mark the 25th anniversary of Supras. Similarly, the Authentiks developed ties with supporters of Copenhagen, while Lutece Falco maintained friendly relations with fans of Derry City and Celtic. Tigris Mystic formed a twinning with Toulon's Irréductibles in 2001, reportedly based in part on a shared rivalry with Marseille. In 2005, the Irréductibles displayed their banner in the Auteuil stand. This relationship continued under the CUP, with the Irréductibles attending a PSG home match in February 2019 and displaying a banner in tribute to PSG ultras, who responded with chants honoring Toulon.

The leading CUP faction, K-Soce Team, established links with the Fluminense ultra groups Sobranada 1902 and Young Flu in 2012, as well as with Napoli's Curva B in 2017. The Boulogne Boys had a twinning with AC Milan's Fossa dei Leoni, known for their rivalry with Napoli supporters. Far-right elements from Boulogne also forged connections with Toulouse hooligan firms, Viola Front, Gitania Tolosa and Camside. Auteuil hooligan firm Karsud maintains ties with former Boulogne groups and with Red Star Belgrade's ultra group Delije, as several Karsud leaders are of Serbian origin. Parias Cohortis and Urban Paris, two factions within the CUP, have friendships with fans of Celtic and AIK, respectively.

== Relationship with players ==
=== Fan favorites ===
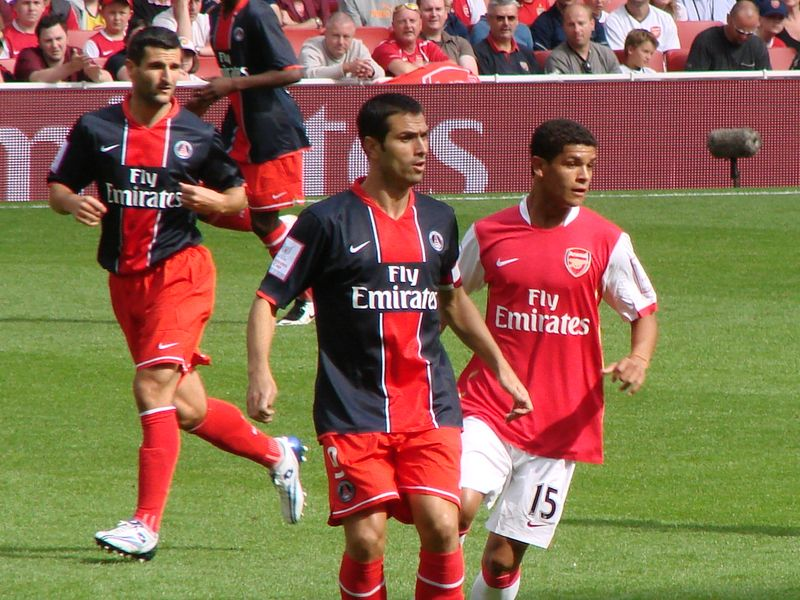
Pauleta during his time at PSG in 2007.

PSG supporters have seen numerous distinguished players leave a lasting mark on the club's history. Among the most celebrated are Jean-Pierre Dogliani in the 1970s; Mustapha Dahleb, Safet Sušić, Luis Fernandez and Jean-Marc Pilorget in the 1980s; Bernard Lama, David Ginola, George Weah and Raí in the 1990s; Ronaldinho, Pauleta and Mamadou Sakho in the 2000s; Zlatan Ibrahimović, Javier Pastore and Blaise Matuidi in the 2010s; and Marco Verratti, Marquinhos, Presnel Kimpembe and Ángel Di María in the 2020s.

Among the women's team's fan favorites are Sabrina Delannoy, Grace Geyoro and Laure Boulleau, who rank among the club's leading appearance-makers; top scorers Marie-Antoinette Katoto, Marie-Laure Delie and Kadidiatou Diani; PSG Academy graduate Sandy Baltimore; and Polish goalkeeper Katarzyna Kiedrzynek. The ultras formed a particularly strong bond with Kiedrzynek. When she left the club in 2020 after seven years, they unfurled two large banners reading, "Thank you, Kasia. Our home will always be open for you."

Historic goals have often been decisive in elevating players to idol status among the supporters. Antoine Kombouaré was nicknamed "Gold Helmet" after his last-gasp header against Real Madrid sent PSG to the UEFA Cup semifinals in 1993. Three years later, Bruno Ngotty scored a long-range free kick in the 1996 UEFA Cup Winners' Cup final, securing PSG's first European title. Finally, Amara Diané saved the club from relegation to Ligue 2 by netting both goals in a 2–1 victory away to Sochaux in 2008.

Some players are revered by supporters for their achievements both on and off the pitch. Luis Fernandez, a lifelong fan of PSG, served as team captain, was part of the squad that secured the club's first major trophies in the 1980s, and later managed PSG in the 1990s, guiding the team to their first European title in 1996. Leonardo, meanwhile, impressed during his single season in Paris before returning in 2011 as sporting director, overseeing the recruitment of the next generation of fan favorites. Among them, Blaise Matuidi became a darling of the PSG ultras after advocating for their return in 2016, while Marquinhos was honored with a tifo in 2019 in recognition of his combative style and exemplary attitude.

Prior to the 2025 UEFA Champions League final, PSG manager Luis Enrique aimed to replicate his 2015 Champions League celebrations with Barcelona alongside his late daughter Xana, who died in 2019 from bone cancer. Following PSG's victory over Inter Milan, supporters displayed a banner depicting Enrique and Xana planting a PSG flag, echoing the iconic 2015 moment in Berlin. Subsequently, after Ousmane Dembélé and Luis Enrique were awarded the 2025 Ballon d'Or as best player and best manager, PSG supporters unveiled two tifos in their honour. One depicted Dembélé holding the Ballon d'Or with the slogan "Prince of the city turned king of the world," while the other showed Enrique alongside PSG's trophies, accompanied by the phrase "You cannot understand," a reference to a club documentary released the previous year.

=== Racial divide ===
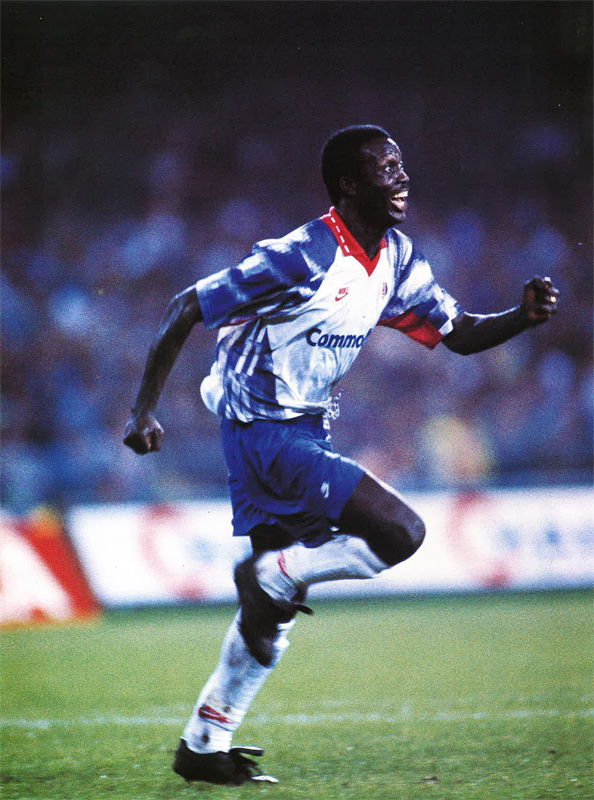
George Weah with PSG in 1992.

Regarding the racial divide between the KoB and the VA, a player such as Bernard Lama, with roots in French Guiana and a spearhead in the fight against racism in football, was very popular with the Auteuil stand, some of whom are immigrants or from overseas. PSG have often signed players of North African (Mustapha Dahleb, Ali Benarbia, Selim Benachour), Portuguese (Pauleta), or Brazilian (Raí, Leonardo, Ronaldinho, Valdo) origin to attract fans from these communities, who are very present in Paris, and all of them have felt understandably closer to the VA.

On the other hand, Francis Llacer, a player on the verge of violence was very popular among Boulogne fans, who identified with his "bad boy" side. The French defender was also white and was born in Paris. Other white players such as Luis Fernández, Safet Sušić and Joël Bats were darlings of the KoB as well. In 1986, after his final match for PSG, Fernández received a standing ovation and performed a memorable lap of honor. He was considered the spiritual son of the Boulogne Boys, as he supported the creation of this ultra group. "Magic Sušić" was honored with a "Hail the Artist" banner during his last match in May 1991, while Bats received a standing ovation and a cloud of flares following seven years of loyal service in 1992.

The KoB have a history of racial abuse towards their own black players. They taunted black French goalkeeper Bernard Lama when he arrived in 1992 to replace white idol Joël Bats, whistling him and displaying swastikas during games. Lama, however, went on to become a fan favorite and club legend for his performances. After his last match, the KoB refused to leave the stadium until Lama came to greet them. In 2011, during Lama's testimonial match at the Parc des Princes, George Weah told reporters he did not have a good memory of the stadium and was there only to honor his friend. The Liberian striker was also targeted by the KoB in 1995 following a subpar display versus AC Milan.

PSG lost both matches against Milan and missed out on the Champions League final. After the return game, having told reporters that he wanted to sign for the Italian club next season, Weah was accused of underperforming since he wanted to join them. In his final game at the Parc, with the transfer confirmed, Boulogne insulted him and made monkey sounds every time he touched the ball. Casual Firm unfurled a racist banner that read "Weah, we do not need you" written with Celtic crosses and other neo-Nazi symbols. White midfielder David Ginola, who also expressed his desire the club that season, did not receive the same treatment. Another incident that made headiness was Vikash Dhorasoo, a France international of Indian origin, being told by a Boulogne fan to "go sell peanuts in the metro" during a game in 2006.

=== Farewell tributes ===
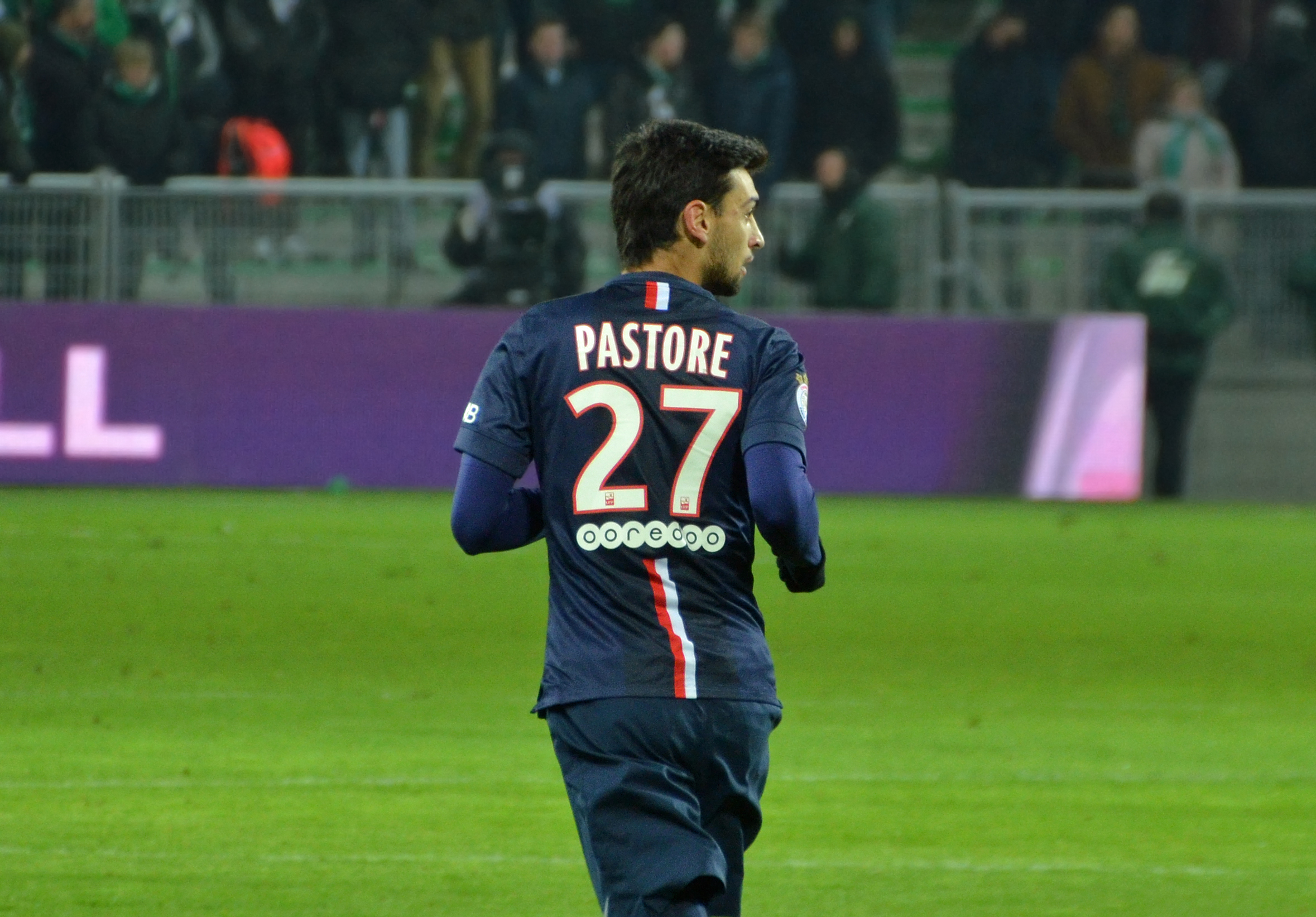
Javier Pastore in action for PSG in 2015.

Beloved by Auteuil and Boulogne, Raí played his final match at the Parc des Princes in April 1998. Both stands had made tifos in praise, with the stadium adorned in the colors of Brazil, but he decided to salute the VA first. In the hallways of Auteuil, some of the club's most important figures had portraits on the walls, including one of Raí. With tears in his eyes, he threw his jersey to the Tigris Mystic, before completing his lap of honor at the KoB. The stadium sang "Captain Raí" to the tune of Captain Future, one of the few songs at the Parc dedicated to a player. "The most emotional moment of my professional life," he said.

Ten years later, Pauleta received a vibrant tribute in May 2008. The Parc once again adopted the colors of his homeland, Portugal. Amid a season in which PSG narrowly avoided relegation, both Auteuil and Boulogne stands celebrated the two-time Ligue 1 top scorer, who vowed over the stadium microphone to keep the club in Ligue 1—a promise he fulfilled a week later at Sochaux. In 2018, it was Javier Pastore's turn to be honored. In homage to the Argentine playmaker, the CUP unfurled a banner reading "Javier, always at home, at the Parc" and gave him a long standing ovation. Zlatan Ibrahimović, the club's top scorer at the time, left PSG in May 2016, just before the return of the ultras, and therefore missed out on such an honor. For his farewell match, the club organized a ceremony at the Parc, where Zlatan completed a lap of honor alongside his children.

During his final game at the Parc in May 2022, after seven seasons and a record 112 assists, outgoing PSG legend Ángel Di María enjoyed a parade of honor from his teammates and a moving tribute from the CUP and the club. Another emotional farewell was that of Marco Verratti in September 2023. With eleven seasons under his belt, having arrived in Paris aged just 19, the ultras hung a banner dedicated to him: "A decade of magic, 30 trophies with Paris. A monument named Marco Verratti." PSG Academy graduates Mamadou Sakho and Presnel Kimpembe received almost the same honours upon returning to the Parc des Princes for their farewells. Sakho left the club after 11 years in 2013, while Kimpembe spent 20 years at PSG. The CUP featured a tifo of Kimpembe holding the Champions League trophy won in 2025, during his final season at the club.

=== Heroes and villains ===
Several players went from fan favorites to "traitors" during the 2000s after joining arch-rivals Marseille directly from PSG. Team captain Frédéric Déhu and Fabrice Fiorèse were the first to experience this in 2004. PSG Academy idol Lorik Cana and Modeste M'bami were next in 2005 and 2006, respectively. These were followed by Gabriel Heinze in 2009 and, most recently, Adrien Rabiot in 2025. Each time they returned to play at the Parc des Princes, they were greeted by PSG ultras with insults, whistles, and hostile banners. Even superstars such as Neymar, Kylian Mbappé, Thiago Silva, Edinson Cavani, and Lionel Messi have oscillated between hero and villain status among PSG supporters.

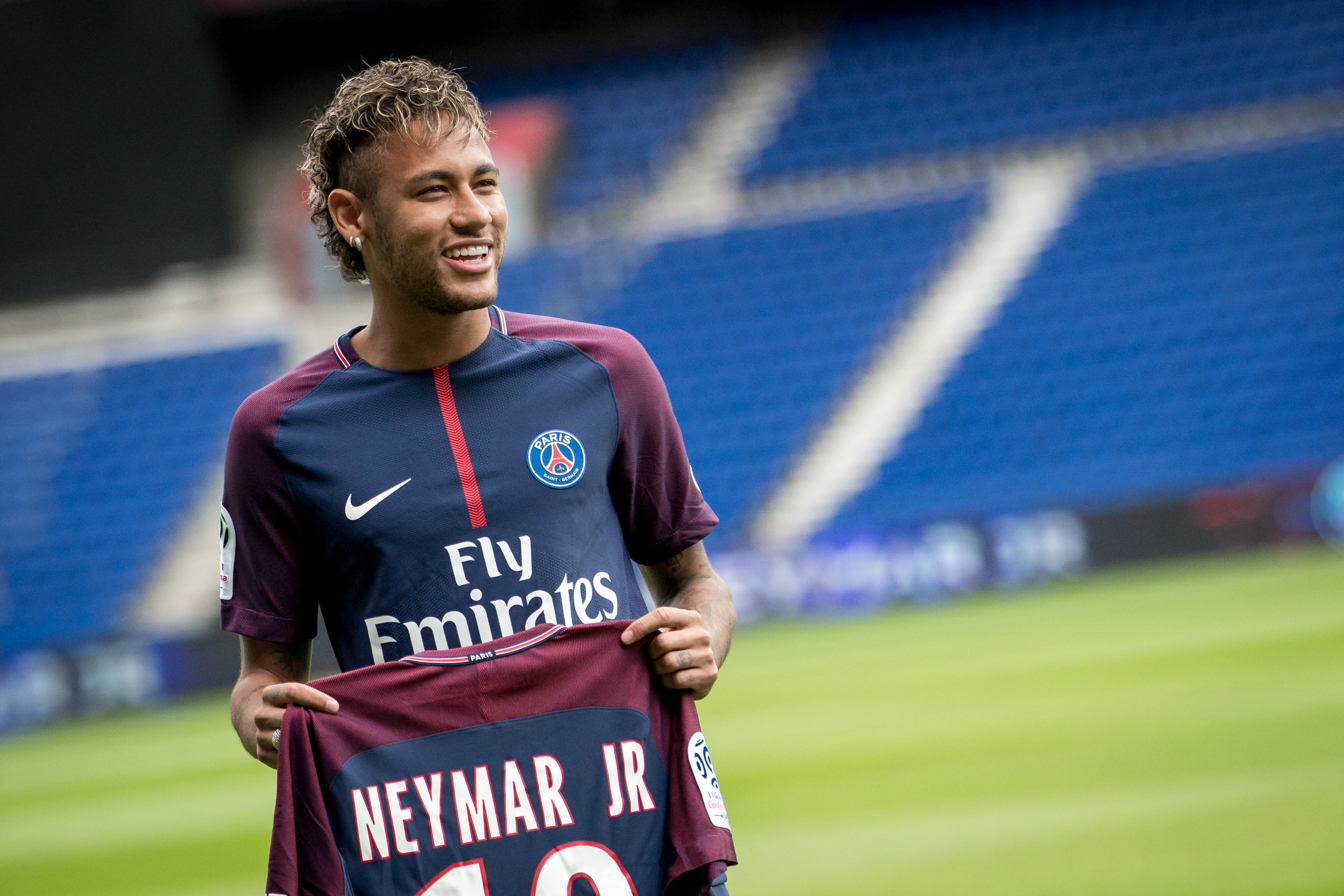
Neymar at his PSG presentation in 2017.

In August 2017, Neymar joined PSG from Barcelona for a world-record fee of €222 million, immediately becoming an idol for the ultras. His six-year spell at PSG, however, was marred by injuries and unfulfilled expectations, most notably failing to win the Champions League. During his homecoming in 2019, after he pushed for a return to Barcelona, the CUP distributed flyers labeling him "the most disgusting player in the history of PSG," chanted "Neymar, son of a bitch," booed him whenever he touched the ball, and displayed two banners urging his father to sell his "whore" son in a Rio de Janeiro red-light district.

In February 2020, the CUP unfurled a banner urging Neymar, Mbappé, and Silva to "man up" following a defeat to Borussia Dortmund. Neymar subsequently led PSG to the UCL final, prompting public displays of gratitude from the ultras. In the aftermath, amid the COVID-19 pandemic, Thiago Silva did not receive a proper sendoff, while Edinson Cavani disappointed many within the CUP. Mistreated by the club, he departed without thanking the supporters. Neymar's reconciliation with the ultras also proved short-lived. After another season-ending injury in May 2023, a small group of fans gathered outside the player’s home to demand his departure. When he left in August 2023, the CUP displayed a banner reading, “Neymar: finally rid of the rude.”

Kylian Mbappé's relationship with the CUP also experienced highs and lows. The ultras believed that, despite being from Paris, he lacked a genuine passion for PSG and viewed the club as a stepping stone to Real Madrid, even though he had stated that playing for PSG had been his childhood dream. He rejected moves to the Spanish giants twice, aiming to win the Champions League with Paris. Mbappé ultimately did not achieve that goal and signed for Madrid in 2024, but departed on good terms with most of the ultras. For his final match at the Parc des Princes, amid some boos from Auteuil, the CUP displayed a tifo of him in a PSG shirt and a banner reading: "Boy from the Parisian suburbs, you have become a PSG legend."

Lionel Messi arrived in the summer of 2021 to help PSG secure the elusive Champions League crown. However, his lackluster performances in the French capital left fans feeling that Messi offered little return on their investment. He was frequently booed during his time at PSG, and the situation escalated after Messi skipped training to take an unauthorized trip to Saudi Arabia, for which he was suspended by the club. The ultras reacted by showing up at PSG headquarters and demanding he leave the club, with chants of "Messi, son of a bitch!", and booing him during his final match in Paris in June 2023. CUP members also held up a banner that read: "Messi: finally rid of the rude."

== History ==
=== Kop of Boulogne ===
==== From Kop K to KoB ====
The formation of PSG's supporters' groups is closely linked to the Parc des Princes. The club played its first match there in November 1973, defeating Ligue 2 promotion rivals Red Star. Before kick-off, the team warmed up in front of their home fans in Boulogne, beginning a tradition that continues to this day. PSG permanently moved into the stadium in July 1974, when they returned to Ligue 1, replacing Paris FC as their tenant ahead of the 1974–75 season. The club's oldest supporters' group, Les Amis du PSG, was founded shortly after, in January 1975. Its members set up in the center of the Borelli stand with a banner reading "The Spirit Club." Les Amis follow the classic fan model: a friendly, family-oriented group of supporters who are respectful, non-protesting, and whose easygoing spirit does not generate animosity or controversy with rival fans, broadcasters, football organizations, the club, or other institutions. Other types of fans and ultras present at the stadium, influenced by Italian and English models, have been more or less antagonistic.

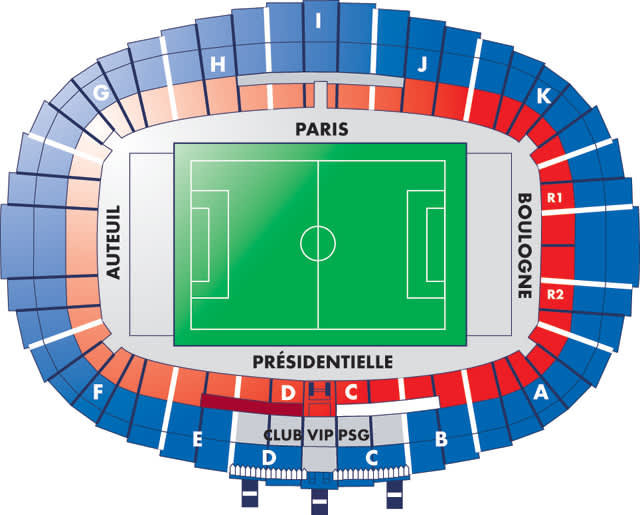
Map of the Parc des Princes.

In September 1976, to attract more fans to the newly founded Parisian team, whose matches were still largely attended by visiting supporters, PSG began offering youth discounts in the Blue K Section, the first dedicated fan zone at the Parc des Princes. The "ten matches for ten francs" offer, implemented by club president Daniel Hechter, was a major success; the number of season ticket holders grew from 500 in 1976 to 3,000 in 1977. These supporters named their section the "Kop K," a reference to Anfield's Spion Kop stand, home to Liverpool fans. Following an increase in ticket prices, fans from the Kop K moved to the Boulogne stand in August 1978, and the Kop K became the Kop of Boulogne (KoB). PSG players had been warming up in that section since 1973, so the fans were eager to be closer to their idols. The KoB were awarded the honorary title of "Best Public in France" for the 1978–79 season.

In its early years, the KoB operated under the guidance of Les Amis du PSG. By the end of the 1980–81 season, however, the KoB had become more independent and were no longer under Les Amis' supervision. Between 1978 and 1985, the stand remained largely open to visiting supporters, and clashes between KoB ultras and opposing fans were frequent. By the 1981–82 season, travel to away matches had also become increasingly difficult. During the 1982–83 season, the KoB began openly rejecting Les Amis, criticizing their approach to fair play as "old-fashioned" and instead identifying themselves as hooligans, a term that inspired fear among opposing fans.

Violent incidents followed PSG wherever the club played, culminating in a definitive split between Les Amis and the KoB at the end of the 1983–84 season. René Letellier, founder of Les Amis, described the KoB as "thugs," and several fans left the stand, no longer identifying with its warlike philosophy and elements of political extremism. Following the Heysel Stadium disaster in May 1985, largely attributed to hooliganism, the club closed the KoB to visiting supporters. In September 1985, PSG fans received their first travel ban, preventing them from attending the club's match against Le Havre after hooligans had vandalized the stadiums of Auxerre and Nice in August 1985.

==== Ultras, kopistes and hooligans ====
The increase in violence, condemned by other KoB fans, led to the founding of the Boulogne Boys in December 1985, with the blessing of PSG president Francis Borelli. It was the beginning of a power struggle between fans of the English and Italian schools; the KoB no longer existed as a united front, but as an entity bringing together several groups. Federated under a banner portraying a growling bulldog's head with a spiked collar on top of the French flag, the KoB was made up by Italian-style ultras Boulogne Boys and Tifo e Stupido; English-inspired kopistes Gavroches, Firebirds and Rangers; and hooligans (also known as casuals or indépendants) influenced by English casual culture, far-right views and racist leanings like Commando Pirate, Pitbull Kop, Headhunters, PSG Assas Club (PAC), Army Korps, Casual Firm, Section Cigogne, Layache Family, Commando Loubard and Milice Paris.

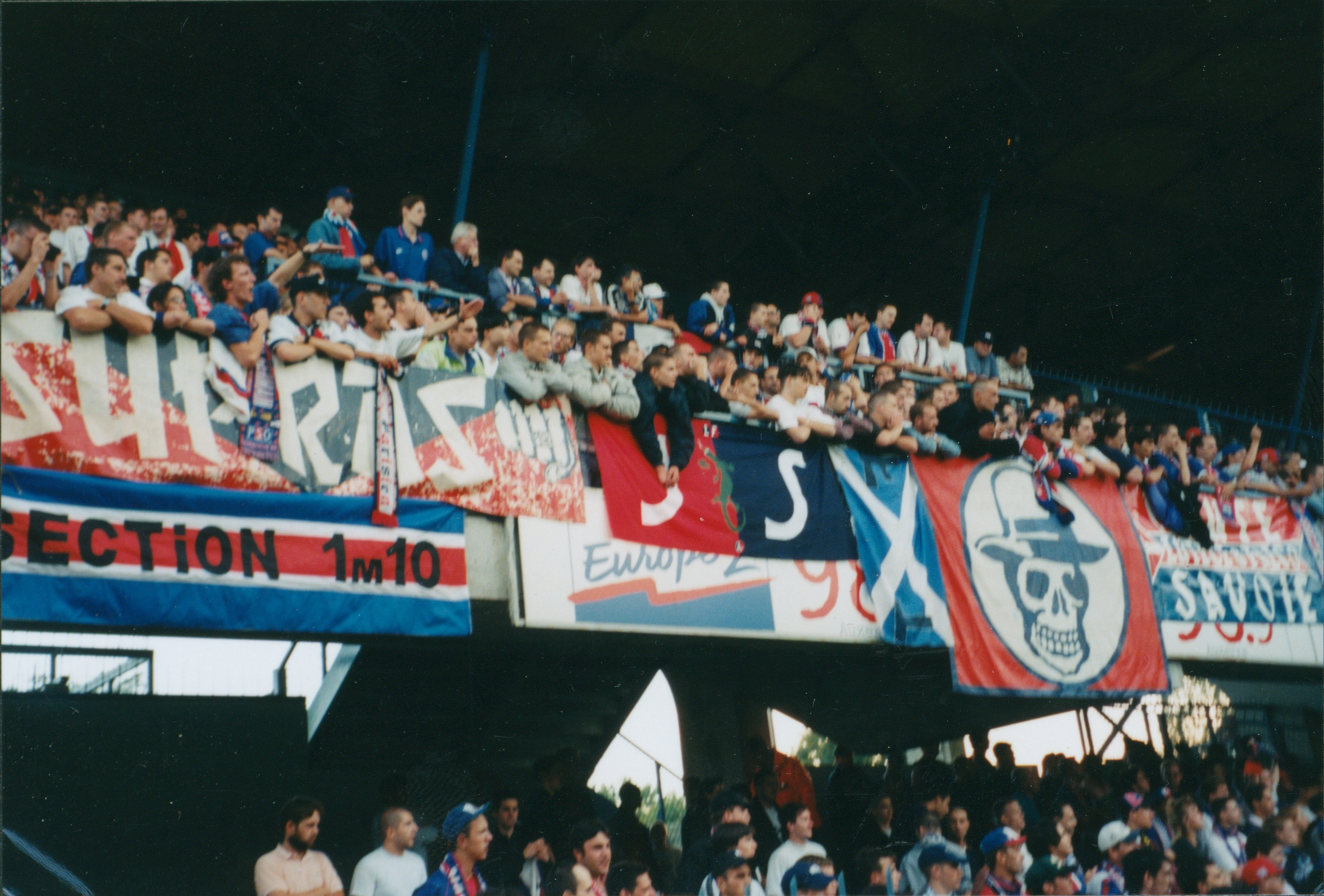
Skull logo of the Boulogne Boys in August 1997.

Boulogne Boys were the first supporters' group of the KoB, the first ultra group of PSG, and one of the oldest of its kind in France. The Boys were influenced by the Italian ultra model and, despite not fitting into the English kop style of the KoB, were its most prominent group. With a skull wearing a hat as its logo, the group's distinctive feature was the use of scheduled and continuous banners, flares, chants and other expressions of tifo to ensure a visual and auditory spectacle. The Boys were a controlling force and a mediator in the stand, and had an unpolitical stance in the highly politicized KoB. Still, some of its members were right-wing sympathizers and people registered by the police as violent.

Located in the right corner of Boulogne Blue, the Boys were one of the most influential groups in PSG history, with 800 members at its peak. The group's visually more appealing and less confrontational Italian inspiration and political neutrality were seen as soft by the KoB, who were shaped by the belligerent approach of English fan culture. Three new groups were formed, inspired by the English kopiste model: Gavroches and Firebirds in March 1986, and Rangers in March 1992. Pure vocal volume and scarf-waving were their main means of support, with much more spontaneous singing and less visual spectacle, giving them a tougher appearance than the Boys. Firebirds also had far-right political inclinations, while the Boys were apolitical. Gavroches and Rangers were next to the Boys in the middle, while Firebirds were on the left side.

Besides the kopistes, hooligans constituted the other dominant force within the KoB. They were primarily based in Boulogne Red, although some of their most veteran members also occupied the left corner of Boulogne Blue. Influenced by the English independent scene and casual culture, they were primarily concerned with fighting rival supporters and played little role in generating an atmosphere inside the stadium. The KoB's first hooligan firm, , Commando Pirate, was founded in 1986, also in response to the emergence of the Boys. Three more groups were established in 1989: Pitbull Kop, Headhunters and PAC. They were followed by Army Korps, founded in 1991 by dissidents from the Boulogne Boys. Two further first-generation groups, Casual Firm and Section Cigogne, emerged during the mid-1990s. Casual Firm subsequently grew into PSG's most prominent hooligan group, assuming a position of leadership within the KoB. Layache Family, Commando Loubard and Milice Paris, established between the early and mid-2000s, represented the second and final generation of hooligan groups associated with the KoB.

==== Home of French hooliganism ====
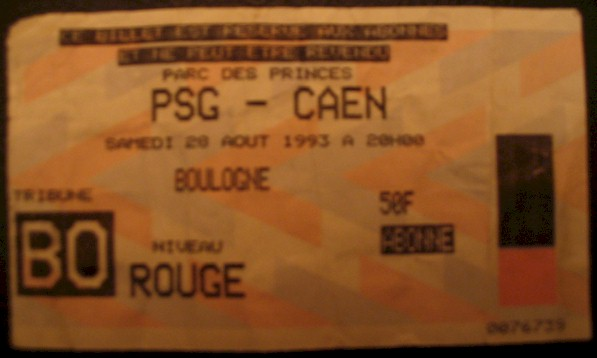
PSG–Caen match ticket in August 1993.

Most KoB supporters were poor disaffected white men who made this stand their meeting point thank to its low admission fees. Some of them were influenced by English casual culture. Typified by hooliganism and the wearing of expensive designer clothing, this culture was exported by Liverpool fans in the late 1970s and early 1980s. As a result, the KoB developed into the home of French hooliganism in the mid-1980s. Rival fans, who had always sat in Boulogne, had to be moved across the field to Auteuil, which became the away stand until 1991. This prompted KoB hooligans to form away parties that sneaked through the stands and attacked the visitors.

The first hooligan incidents involving PSG supporters from the KoB took place during an away game against Nancy in January 1977. Since then, they have clashed with hooligans from all over France, most notably those from big teams such as Saint-Étienne, Nantes, Lyon, Nice and Marseille. Since PSG and Marseille also have a fierce sporting rivalry, known as Le Classique, incidents have been more frequent. PSG radicals have also fought fans from smaller sides like Bastia, Auxerre, Stade Rennais and Tours.

During the club's European debut season, Juventus supporters were violently attacked by the KoB, who invaded the away section during a match in October 1983. In February 1984, the KoB clashed with English hooligans at the Parc des Princes during an international match between France and England, leaving dozens injured and bringing international attention to PSG's hooligan scene. Further clashes with Juventus supporters occurred in October 1989, when around a dozen Italians were seriously injured at a café in Paris, and again in April 1993, when a Juventus supporter was beaten unconscious before a match at the Parc des Princes.

In August 1993, PSG hooligan firms Commando Pirate and Army Korps, together with the far-right group Firebirds, were involved in clashes during a match against Caen at the Parc des Princes, leaving ten officers of the French Republican Security Corps (CRS) injured. The violence erupted after police officers entered the Boulogne stand to arrest a supporter who had run onto the pitch to retrieve his shoe. Once inside, the officers were overwhelmed by KoB members, who attacked them. One officer was beaten so severely that he fell into a coma. The incident, regarded as one of the darkest episodes in French football, led to the dissolution of all three groups by French Sports Minister Michèle Alliot-Marie.

Casual Firm quickly filled the void in December 1993, followed by Section Cigogne in 1996. They were later joined by Layache Family in 2001, Commando Loubard in 2003, and Milice Paris in 2006. KoB hooligans were among the most active in Europe throughout the 1990s and 2000s. They clashed with opposing thugs from Galatasaray, Arsenal, Bayern Munich, Rangers, CSKA Moscow, Hapoel Tel Aviv and Twente. Their attack on Chelsea hooligan firm Chelsea Headhunters earned the KoB high praise on web sites dedicated to football violence. In September 2004, a 150-strong PSG mob assaulted around 50 Chelsea hooligans before their Champions League match in Paris.

==== Racism in the KoB ====
The KoB underwent a political evolution comparable to that of the English and Italian stands. During the 1980s, the stand gradually became a white-only and French nationalist territory, with racist chants (such as "France for the French") and Nazi salutes as regular features. In an attempt to exploit the KoB for political gain, Serge Ayoub, known as Batskin, a French far-right political activist and leader of the white supremacist organization Revolutionary Nationalist Youth, created his own group in 1989, the Pitbull Kop.

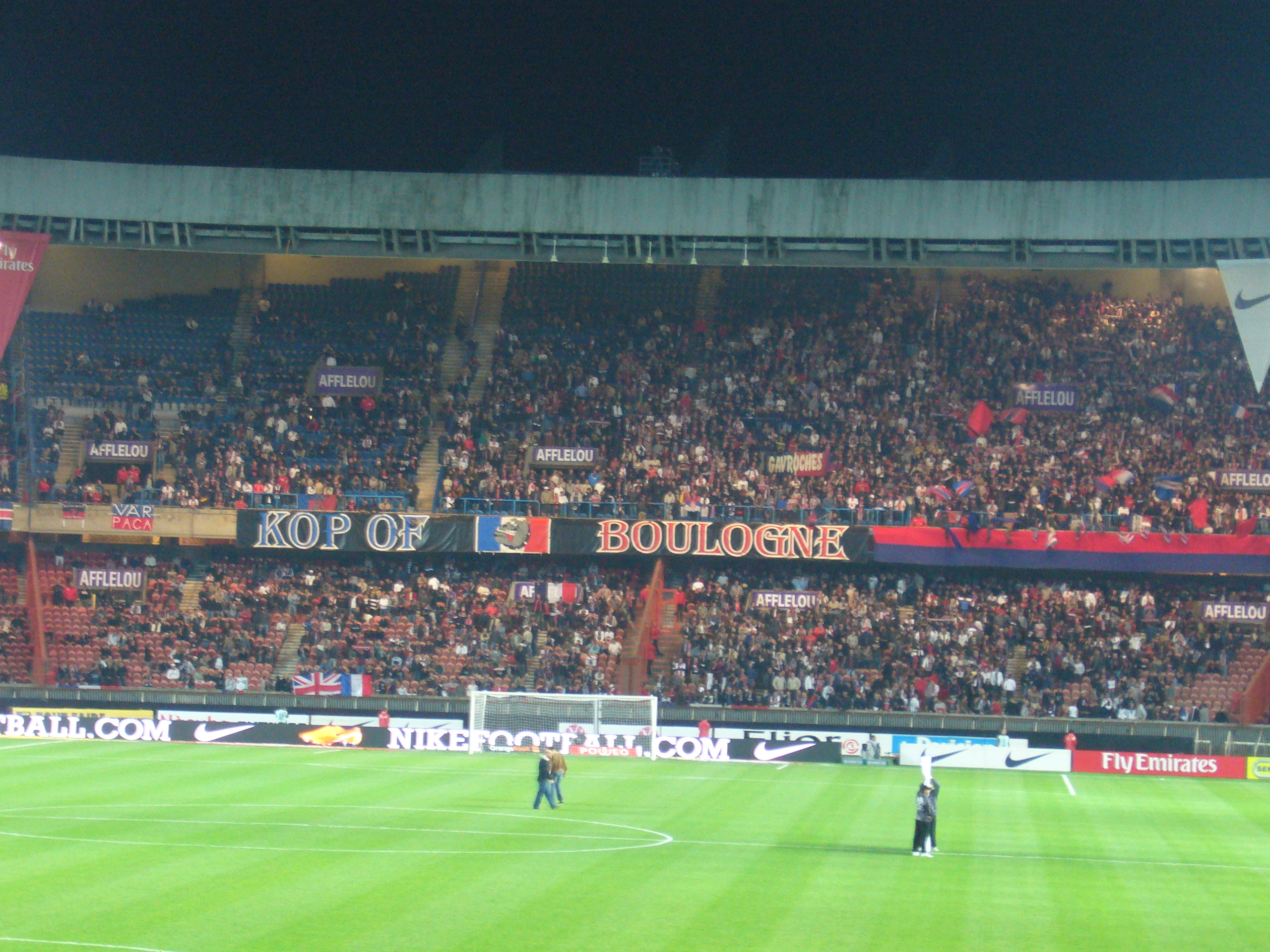
Kop of Boulogne banner in September 2008.

Two more hooligan firms, also openly racist and politicized, were formed in 1989: Headhunters and PAC. Headhunters were exclusively far-right extremists, racists and anti-Semites. PAC had around fifty members as early as 1995, before growing in number. Its aim was to unite students from the Paris-Panthéon-Assas University who attended the Boulogne stand. Many of them were part of right-wing movements, but the group's longevity repeatedly redefined its influence, and the number of its members with conservative political stances declined considerably. Army Korps, another hooligan group founded in 1991, were also initially allied with Pitbull Kop. Inevitably, the first reported racist incident took place that year, when Arab fans were attacked by KoB hooligans.

The hooligans, with a more casual and less overtly militant look, rejected the radicalism and lack of autonomy of these groups. Batskin was also accused of having made a monetary deal with the club to act as a security guard and ensure public order in the stand. Army Korps had grown closer to Commando Pirate by that point, while PAC had distanced themselves from Batskin. Led by Commando Pirate, the hooligans forced Batskin and his followers to leave the Parc des Princes, and purely political groups Pitbull Kop and Headhunters disbanded in 1992. However, this claim to a white and nationalist identity remained anchored in the DNA of the KoB and persisted in more or less openly assumed forms. It became one of the triggers of the war with Auteuil.

In the mid-2000s, the KoB experienced a repoliticization through the rise of Milice Paris and Commando Loubard, two hooligan groups with close ties to the Groupe Union Défense (GUD), a far-right student union based at Paris-Panthéon-Assas University, and the Identitarian nationalist movement Les Identitaires. In January 2006, two Arab youths were assaulted by the KoB during a PSG home match against Sochaux. Six KoB hooligans then ambushed a black man after a match at Le Mans in early November 2006. Two of the assailants received prison sentences. These two incidents were a prelude to the death of Julien Quemener in late November 2006. The Boulogne Boys member was among a large group of fans that racially harassed a Hapoel Tel Aviv supporter after the Israeli club defeated PSG at the Parc des Princes. A police officer intervened to help him and killed Quemener in self-defence.

=== Virage Auteuil ===
==== From Fanatics to Supras ====
Frequented by casual spectators during the 1970s, Auteuil became the away stand in the mid-1980s following the KoB's newfound hooligan tendencies. Auteuil Fanatics, formed in 1989, were the stand's first fan group. Composed of around a dozen members, they traveled to away matches and occupied the right corner of Auteuil Blue. PSG were on the rise in French football, winning its first league title in 1986 and finishing second in 1989, but attendances were declining from the steady levels it had enjoyed in the early 1980s. In the press, violence and racism in the KoB were blamed. In May 1991, while enjoying its worst attendance record since returning to the top flight and struggling financially, PSG were acquired by French media company Canal+. Appointed by the new owners, club president Michel Denisot quickly realized the problem that the KoB represented for the image of PSG and Canal+.

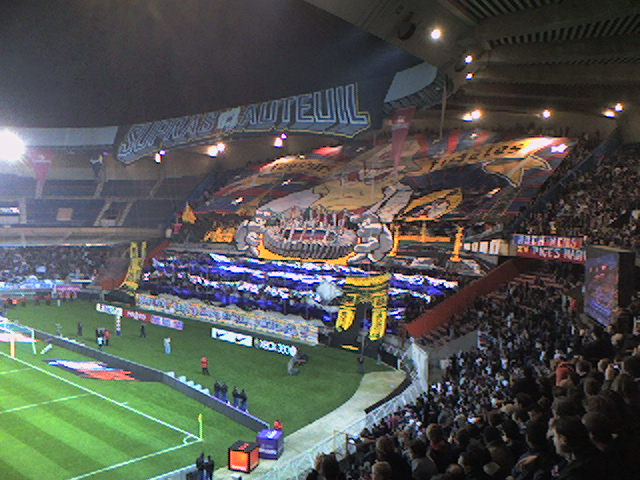
15th anniversary of Supras Auteuil in 2006.

Rather than root out racists, PSG tacitly accepted that Boulogne was a white-only stand and tried to attract members of ethnic minorities to the opposite end of the ground, the Auteuil stand, in the autumn of 1991. The club moved the away stand from Auteuil to the adjacent corner in Section F and subsidized fans who, fed up with the KoB, were willing to move to the other side of the pitch. Many made the switch, but historical groups such as Boulogne Boys, Gavroches and Rangers decided to stay in the KoB.

Discussions between the club and some die-hard fans already present in Auteuil led to the creation of the Supras Auteuil, the stand's first ultra group, as well as the first to assert its cosmopolitan image. Founded in September 1991, the Supras summed up this philosophy, being the contraction of "SUPporters" and "ultRAS." Under the logo of a fist with a ring on the middle finger adorned with the PSG crest and its motto "Always Faithful," they grew from 30 to 500 members by 1995. Auteuil Fanatics, who were intermittently active and not involved in the ultra movement, disbanded in 1992 and the Supras took their place in the stands.

Supras consisted of three subgroups: Génération Supras, K-Soce Team (KST) and Microbes Paris. Formed in 2001 as part of the group's tenth anniversary celebrations, Génération were considered its most important section. They were responsible for recruiting and mentoring young members, most of whom would go on to form KST and Microbes, both in 2006. The latter two subgroups were founding members of the Collectif Ultras Paris in 2016, with KST being their most influential member.

At the start of the 1991–92 season, the name Virage Auteuil (VA) was chosen for the stand; "Virage" is the literal French translation of the Italian word for "curva." Auteuil stylized its support on the Italian ultra model of apolitical fan culture, with an organized and choreographed support of the team, known as tifo, in contrast to the English-inspired, right-leaning Boulogne. They also claimed to be more pacifist and tolerant, unlike the KoB and its very Anglo-Saxon, protest-oriented side. The exodus from Boulogne accelerated after the match against Caen in the summer of 1993. The club again opted for conciliation, attempting to control the KoB by employing some of their leaders as stewards in the stadium. This angered Auteuil fans, who interpreted the move as a further endorsement of racism by the French elite. The VA was a way for the club to fight racism, but in the long run it proved to be a mistake.

==== Lutece, Tigris and Karsud ====
In October 1991, former members of the Boulogne Boys, exasperated by the politics and violence within the KoB, created their own group, Lutece Falco. "Lutece" is the French form of Lutetia, the Roman city where Paris now stands, and "Falco" referred to the falcons that nest atop Notre-Dame. Its members settled alongside the KoB in the Blue K Section of the Paris stand, considered the cradle of the PSG fan movement. However, Lutece were considered disruptive and failed to revitalize that area of the stadium, so they took advantage of Canal+ subsidies and moved to the VA in February 1992, taking place next to Supras, in the left corner of Auteuil Blue. Under the logo of a falcon and with close ties to Irish culture, Lutece were described as "the most peaceful gathering of fans in the Parc," and declared themselves completely apolitical. It initially consisted of around fifteen members and at its peak had over 400.

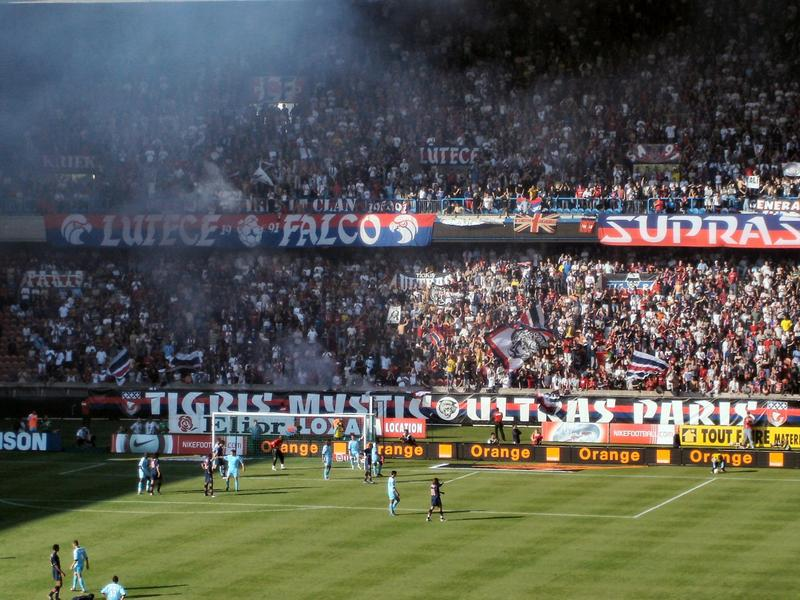
Banners of Lutece, Supras and Tigris in 2004.

Under the leadership of Supras and Lutece, the VA boomed. PSG's success on the European scene also allowed more people to join the stands, which grew from 30 to 200 members in six months. The club, which already provided an annual subsidy to the groups, contributed to the costs of the tifos, whose number continued to increase. The VA had become a reference within the French ultra movement when PSG faced AC Milan at the Parc in the semi-finals of the Champions League in April 1995. Before kick-off, Auteuil welcomed its players by unveiling a spectacular tifo, which was voted the "Best European Tifo" of the 1994–95 season by the Torcida International Fans Organization (TIFO). The tifo against Steaua Bucharest in August 1997 was also a major milestone for the VA.

By the end of 1993, three new groups had joined the Auteuil stand: Dragons, Tigris Mystic and Titans. The stand welcomed Karsud next the following year, and Kriek completed the VA roster in 1999. Karsud were founded in 1994 as a subgroup of the Supras, but became independent in 1995. Their logo, a terrifying Halloween pumpkin, and their motto, "Riot with Style," made Karsud the first and only hooligan group in Auteuil. They never had more than forty members and cared little about banners, tifos, or travel arrangements. Nestled in between Lutece and Supras in Auteuil Blue, Karsud had the ambiguous reputation of being the "gendarmes of Auteuil", but also of enjoying good relations with the far-right KoB, with whom they have shared fights.

While Titans, Karsud, and Kriek maintained stable membership, Tigris experienced considerable growth, eventually surpassing the declining Dragons. In 1997, the two groups decided to merge, with Tigris absorbing Dragons. Throughout the 1990s, Auteuil's ultra identity became increasingly established. Tigris is widely regarded as one of the driving forces behind the emergence of the Virage Auteuil (VA) and the development of the ultra movement in Paris. In keeping with one of their mottos, "Never on trend, always in the right direction," inspired by the French rap collective Scred Connexion, Tigris became the first group to achieve financial independence from the club, renouncing subsidies in 1997 on the grounds that accepting financial support was incompatible with their conception of ultras culture. The other Auteuil groups soon followed their example. In 1999, Tigris also became the first group in the Virage Auteuil to establish its own headquarters. The group contributed to the development of the stand's visual displays, introducing more elaborate tifos and making extensive use of smoke bombs.

==== Coexistence with Boulogne ====
With the creation of the VA, violence decreased at the KoB, while attendances soared to a record high in 1992 and grew steadily over the decade, peaking in 2000. Just as had been the case in Boulogne since 1973, players began warming up in Auteuil in 1998. Both stands competed for visual and vocal dominance, and Auteuil ended up displacing the less flashy and more violent Boulogne. However, the VA never questioned the authority of the KoB and chose to grow in its shadow. As a result, these two fandom scenes, with their radically different racial makeup, coexisted in relative peace throughout the 1990s and early 2000s. They began exchanging famous club mottos like "Ici, c'est Paris" ("This is Paris") and "Paris est magique" ("Paris is magical") in 1997, becoming a hallmark of PSG home games, and even brawled together against opposing fans.

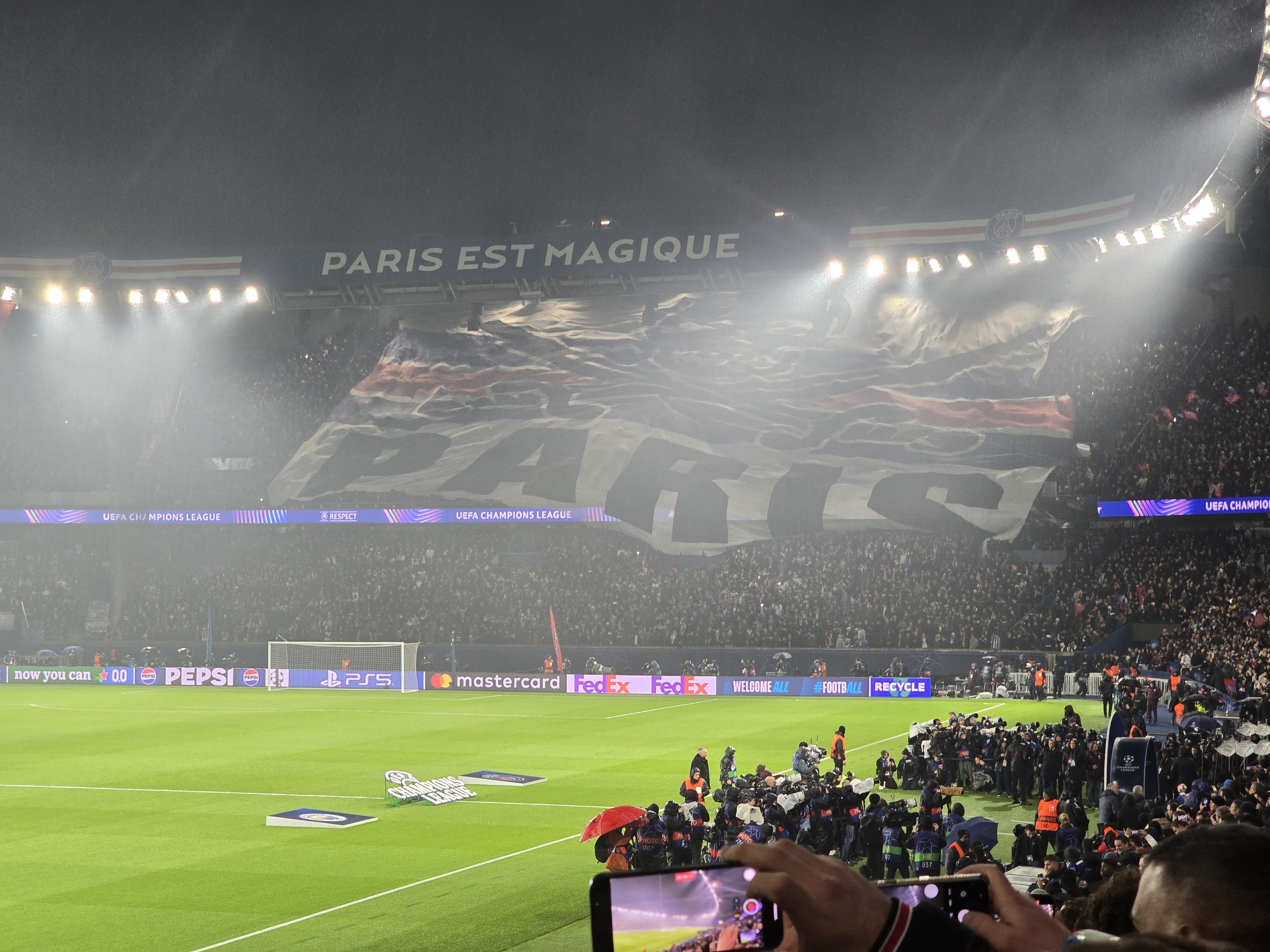
Iconic PSG motto "Paris est magique."

Before their UEFA Cup match at the Parc des Princes in November 1992, Boulogne's Commando Pirate and Anderlecht hooligan firm O'Side had a cordial relationship dating back to the early 1980s. O'Side assisted the Parisians during matches in Lille, while Commando Pirates traveled to Belgium for matches classified as high-risk. On match day, a sort of non-aggression pact was established, but when O'Side attacked members of Auteuil just hours before kickoff, everything changed. Around 100 KoB members responded, seriously injuring two Anderlecht fans. There were also incidents during the match involving Auteuil, with seats flying between the visitors and PSG ultras.

The VA had already made a name for itself thanks to its tifos as well as its mass trips to away matches, and its first feats of arms were not long in coming. In the summer of 1998, members of Tigris Mystic stole the banner of Marseille ultra group Commando Ultra. In August, the VA displayed it at the Stade de la Meinau during PSG's away match against Strasbourg. In the ultra world, stealing a banner and displaying it publicly was a terrible affront. In September, they hung it on the Eiffel Tower, and the photo went viral. The following spring, in May 1999, the Marseille ultras arrived at the Parc with a score to settle. Positioned next to Auteuil in the away stand, they charged onto the pitch and tried to tear down their banners. PSG ultras rushed to defend their territory, and blows were exchanged near the advertising boards. The chaos lasted for several minutes, during which a piece of the Tigris banner was torn down.

After this home setback, VA learned to defend itself, as it demonstrated against Galatasaray in March 2001, during a Champions League match in Paris. The Turkish supporters tried to steal the banner of Supras Auteuil, drawing the ire of the VA and the KoB. Still on good terms at the time, they joined forces and attacked the Galatasaray fans from both sides. Over fifty Turks had to be hospitalized. In the following match, the KoB leaders went to congratulate the Auteuil ultras for their first proper fight. However, for the most part, collective action within the VA remained fundamentally choreographic. While the KoB boasted a common identity known as the "Kop," Auteuil's unity was fragile due to ego issues, as well as divergent ambitions and mentalities among the groups. At the time, Karsud lobbied, in vain, to establish a collective and consolidate the cohesion of the VA.

==== Racial and political tension ====
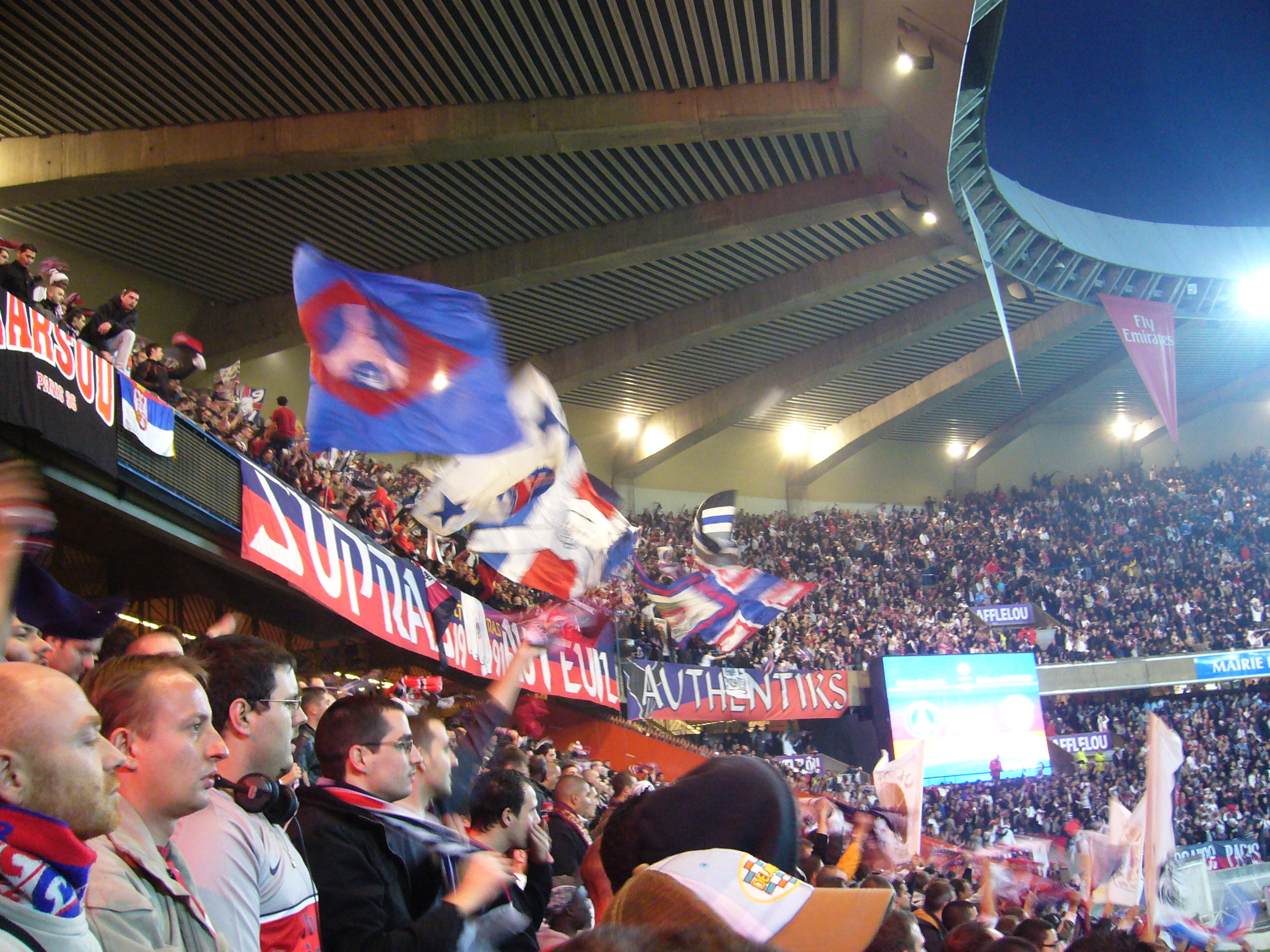
Banners of Karsud, Supras and Authentiks in 2008.

Auteuil was a veritable mosaic composed of former Boulogne supporters—generally white and disillusioned with the violent atmosphere of the KoB—as well as fans of post-colonial immigrant descent who had been excluded from the KoB. During the 1990s, the VA fostered a more diverse identity within the French ultra movement, which until then had been predominantly white. While the KoB harbored a far-right, white supremacist minority, the VA developed a racially mixed, left-leaning, and anti-racist profile. The multiethnic crowd gathered in Auteuil came to symbolize the broader diversity of Paris.

France's victory at the 1998 FIFA World Cup, on home soil, appeared to unite the country, with Zinedine Zidane and his teammates dubbed the "Black, Blanc, Beur" (Black, white, Arab) team in reference to their diverse backgrounds. The reality, however, proved more complex. The far-right political party National Rally rose to prominence in the years following the triumph, and riots erupted in the multicultural Parisian suburbs (banlieues) in 2005 and again in 2023.

The rivalry between the two stands reflected broader debates over immigration in France. While the VA sought to assert its right to participate in public life on an equal footing, members of the KoB portrayed them as unwelcome outsiders attempting to appropriate "their" club, echoing wider societal tensions. During the 2002 French presidential election, some Boulogne supporters backed far-right candidate Jean-Marie Le Pen, and approached the Auteuil stand chanting "Le Pen, President!" in their direction.

Throughout the 1990s, the VA ultras were only tolerated by the KoB on condition that they bowed to racist provocations and intimidation. Auteuil remained pacifist and did not display their cosmopolitanism. The main points of tension between the fans of these two stands were away matches, where they would gather in the same area, unlike at the Parc. Although their numbers away from home were smaller compared to the ultra groups of the growing Auteuil stand, Boulogne secured its hegemony by keeping fans of rival teams, but also the VA entities, at bay through violence. The saying of the time reveals this: "Auteuil sings, Boulogne strikes."

Things changed in the early 2000s, particularly when Tigris Mystic, located in Auteuil Red, gained momentum and agreed to take on the terrain of violence, confronting thugs from other teams, but also standing up to Boulogne and denouncing their racism. Some at the VA became almost as aggressive as the few hundred racist fans in the KoB. When members of Tigris and Supras joined far-left organizations such as the National Confederation of Labour and the New Anticapitalist Party, the stand adopted these political ideas and began openly advocating multiculturalism and anti-racism, which was in stark opposition to Boulogne's far-right tendencies, and an all-out war broke out between the VA and the KoB.

=== Borelli and Paris stands ===
==== Hoolicool and Titi Fosi ====
Banner of Titi Fosi in 2009.

Les Amis du PSG, founded in 1975 and located in the Red B Section of the Borelli stand, were for a long time the only group not from Boulogne or Auteuil and not identifying themselves as ultras, kopistes, or hooligans. In September 1993, following an upsurge in violence in the KoB, Hoolicool joined them. These fans took refuge in the Red K Section of the Paris stand, next to Boulogne, under the motto: Fair Play. A classic group like Les Amis, Hoolicool have around fifty members. Although not part of the ultra or hooligan movement, their location used to be next to the hooligans in Boulogne, their name combines the words "hooligan" and "cool" and they also occasionally make tifos, including the use of smoke bombs.

Two years later, two new classic groups appeared in the Borelli stand: PSG Grand Sud in May 1995 and Titi Fosi in July 1995. Grand Sud settled in the Blue B Section, just above Les Amis, while Titi Fosi did so in the adjacent Blue A Section, next to the Boulogne Boys and the KoB, sporting a logo of a ball at the foot of a palm tree and a banner with the slogan "Kop A Cabana." Made up of around fifty members, Titi Fosi were created with the purpose of energizing the A Section, not known for its ambiance at the time, and serving as an extension of Boulogne.

Hoolicool welcomed Vikings 27, another classic group, to the Red K Section of the Paris stand in June 2001. They are based in Dreux, a commune in the Eure-et-Loir department in northern France, and have around 100 members, 40 or 50 of whom are usually present at the Parc des Princes. In July 2005, classic group Handicap PSG were created at the very bottom of the Paris stand, which has a dedicated area with 32 PRM seats. Bringing together disabled PSG fans, the group receive tickets from the club, allowing their more than 130 members to attend official PSG matches at the Parc des Princes. Handicap PSG members can also attend matches of the women's and handball teams.

==== Authentiks and Brigade Paris ====
By 2001, the Auteuil stand had become too small, and in early 2002, Section G of the neighboring Paris stand, previously reserved for out-of-town invitations, finally opened its doors to season ticket holders. The VA had been full for almost four years, and many were on a waiting list, hoping for the chance to see matches on that side of the stadium at a reasonable price.

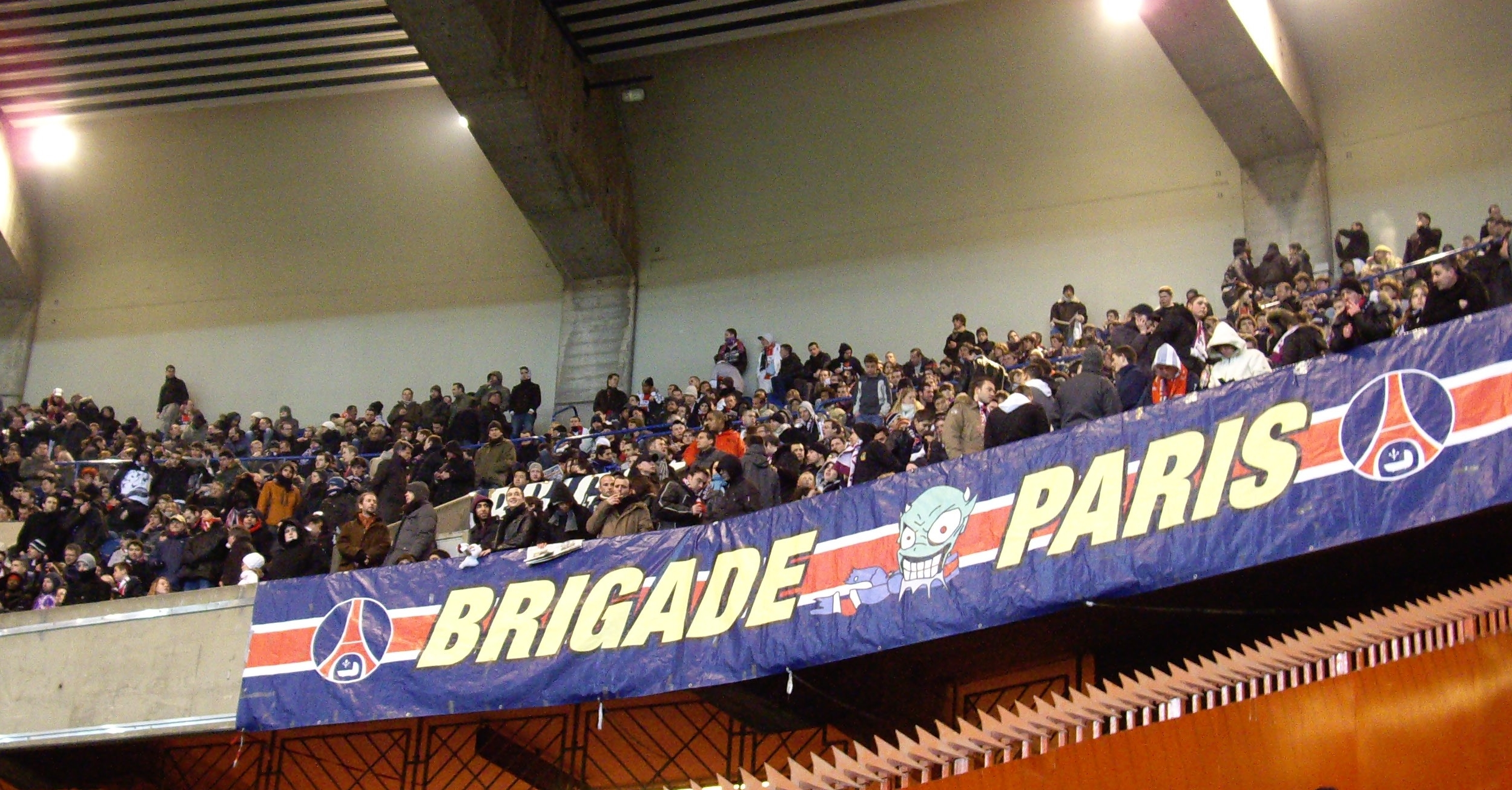
Banner of Brigade Paris in 2009.

The season-ticket campaign was successful, and Authentiks (ATKS), a new generation of supporters inspired by the Auteuil ultra model, emerged in January 2002 next to Supras Auteuil. Initially reluctant to allow an ultra group in the stand, the club approved ATKS's banner after a few months, and the group eventually occupied the entire Blue G Section.

Their friendship with Auteuil, especially the Supras, was total, and the group proclaimed itself an extension of the stand, becoming an essential component of the VAG (Virage Auteuil + Section G) and a sort of ultra "training center" for the VA. ATKS grew rapidly, reaching 400 members at its peak, and were present at almost every PSG away game, becoming a central fixture of the group. They were also the first ultra group not based in the KoB or the VA.

A second ultra group, Puissance Paris (PSP), were founded in January 2003, but never achieved the same level of recognition as ATKS. Featuring a small, bearded figure (similar to a dwarf) wearing a horned Viking helmet as their logo, PSP were initially located in Section H, before moving to the Red G Section, below ATKS, where they reached 100 members. They were also a continuation of Auteuil and therefore a component of the VAG.

The third and final ultra group, Brigade Paris, appeared in the Blue K Section of the Paris stand in January 2007, above Hoolicool and Vikings 27, and alongside the more veteran hooligans in Boulogne. They were created as an extension of the KoB, much as ATKS had been with the VA. Like PSP, they enjoyed considerable success, but were also overshadowed by ATKS. Despite their close ties to Boulogne and a logo depicting a green alien baring its teeth, the message conveyed by their leaders was anti-violence and politically neutral, stating that violent members would be expelled from the group. They took the Boulogne Boys as role models, in the same way that ATKS did with the Supras.

=== Boulogne–Auteuil war ===
==== Tigris Mystic banner ====
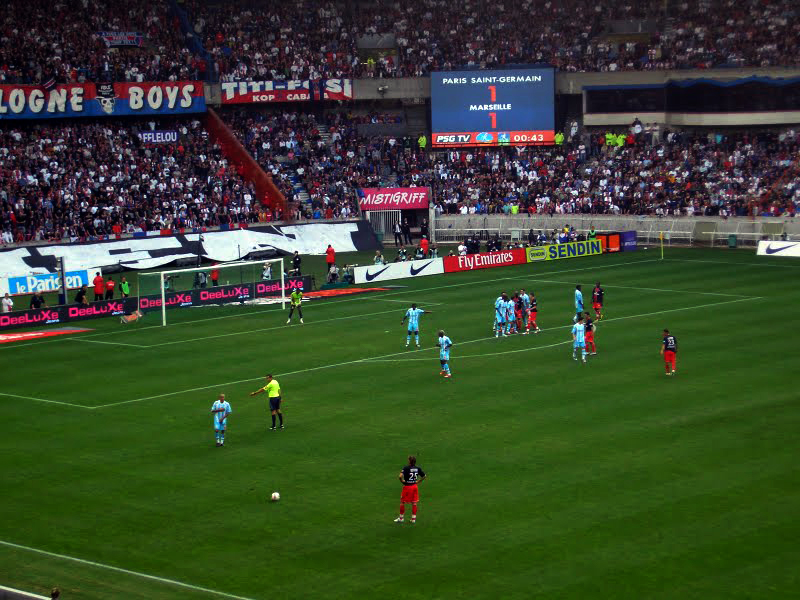
Banner of Boulogne Boys in 2007.

With the arrival of ATKS in 2002, Auteuil's influence grew, while Boulogne gradually lost momentum due to a lack of personnel renewal. As the VAG expanded, tensions with the KoB also intensified. Originally, PSG's supporter base was predominantly white, with far-right elements viewing Boulogne as an immigrant-free territory and enforcing years of racial segregation. Black and Arab supporters from the suburbs were unwelcome in the stand and were instead directed to Auteuil by club stewards, many of whom were former Boulogne leaders, as a security measure. With nearly 500 members in the VA, Tigris Mystic became a driving force behind this shift, representing a new generation of multiethnic Parisian supporters through its hip-hop culture and cosmopolitan outlook.

Tigris, a self-described "black-white-Arab" group, was among the first to oppose racism within sections of the KoB support base. To assert its influence in the stands, it unveiled a banner reading "The Future Belongs To Us" during its tenth anniversary in May 2003. KoB hooligans interpreted the message as a declaration of rivalry, with Auteuil representing the future and Boulogne the past. While some considered the banner arrogant, others believed the KoB were seeking an opportunity to confront a stand that had grown increasingly prominent since 1998. Beneath the rivalry between the KoB and the VA lay longstanding racial tensions.

The first clashes between Auteuil and Boulogne occurred a week after the banner's unveiling. During a PSG match in Auxerre, KoB hooligans attacked the Supras in the away stand, mistaking them for Tigris. Widespread beatings left numerous Tigris and Supras members injured, and the VA contingent left the match early. A week later, at the Stade de France for the 2003 Coupe de France final, Tigris and other Auteuil groups joined the Supras in resisting another KoB ambush. For the first time, the VA stood together and forced the hooligans to withdraw. Neither the club nor the police intervened in either incident.

Suddenly, the clashes outside the Parc des Princes were largely between fans of the same team, unlike anywhere else in Europe. The end of the 2003–04 season was tumultuous, as the Boulogne Boys joined KoB hooligans in their feud against Tigris, brawling with them in a car park after a match at Le Mans in March 2004. Following further clashes during away matches against Nice and Nantes in April, and against Strasbourg in May, relations between Tigris and Auteuil also began to deteriorate. Lutece turned their backs on them following the incidents at Strasbourg, which required police intervention in the stands and left around fifty injured, while Supras and Karsud remained neutral, unlike the cordial relationship of previous seasons. Tigris were perceived as hegemonic by both stands, and some of its members had become as radicalized and violent as those on the other side of the stadium. Monkey shouts, Nazi salutes, and expressions like "dirty blacks" and "dirty Arabs" were heard in the KoB, while "dirty French" was now common in Auteuil.

==== Self-dissolution of Tigris Mystic ====
To address the conflict, PSG appointed Jean-Pierre Larrue, a former member of the GIGN, as head of security in August 2004. Seeking to pacify the Parc des Princes, he presented a list of 500 undesirable fans: 250 from Boulogne's radical fringe and 250 Auteuil supporters known for their involvement in urban violence, all of whom openly opposed the measures. During the 2004–05 season, the KoB and the VA called a truce to jointly oppose Larrue's security measures. Their actions included incendiary banners, a walkout, legal proceedings against the club, death threats against Larrue and PSG president Francis Graille, and a barrage of smoke bombs during a match against Metz in December 2004. Larrue eventually lost the support of his superiors, who cancelled the security plan and dismissed him in May 2005. Although the Auteuil ultras disagreed with his restrictions on tifos and his campaign against smoke bombs, they shared his goal of ending violence and racism in the stadium. They later regretted having supported Boulogne against him.

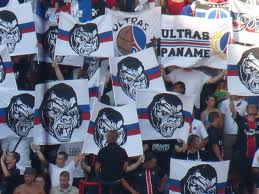
Grinta Paris replaced Tigris Mystic in the Auteuil Red stand in 2008.

With no common enemy, the conflict resumed and escalated during the 2005–06 season. During an away trip to Le Mans in September 2005, a fight broke out after a Boys shouted "Dirty nigger, go back to your McDonald's!" at a Tigris. Later that evening, the groups confronted each other at the Parc des Princes. The Boys were forced to retreat, one supporter was seriously injured, and a Tigris member was sentenced to five months in prison. In retaliation, around 150 hooligans attacked people outside the stadium who resembled Tigris members, particularly young black and Arab men. Inside, the KoB displayed a banner accusing Tigris of being manipulated by far-left organizations.

Racism in the KoB had become intolerable that campaign and the VA began to denounce it, vocally following Tigris when they sang "La Marseillaise" while brandishing their French identity card. In spite of this, the stand did not support the violent actions of Tigris, once again demonstrating a lack of unity. Supras no longer got involved in this conflict, weary of the Auxerre episode; Lutece even less so. As for Karsud, they opposed the Tigris first verbally and then physically, and even went so far as to ally themselves with the KoB hooligans against the Tigris. In October 2005, French Interior Minister Nicolas Sarkozy mediated with the leaders of the Boys and Tigris but changed nothing. Three hours after the meeting, at midnight, members of Casual Firm, armed with iron bars, thrashed the Tigris headquarters in Montreuil, Seine-Saint-Denis.

Despite calls from the Boys and Tigris for conciliation, KoB hooligans, led by Casual Firm, took the reins of the conflict, fighting with increasing ferocity throughout the season against the VA group. Violence reached new levels in April 2006, when Tigris members, reportedly armed with machetes and nail-studded wooden planks, clashed with 20 hooligans returning from a match in Nantes. The ensuing hostilities left five people seriously injured, including one with severed arm ligaments, and a gas station in flames. A week later, Tigris were denied entry to the 2006 Coupe de France final by KoB hooligans after a horrific clash that left numerous people injured, including one Tigris member who was stabbed and remained in the hospital for several weeks. Isolated in Auteuil, scarcely supported by the club, at constant war with the KoB, and increasingly targeted by police repression, Tigris decided to self-dissolve in July 2006, following the implementation of an anti-sporting violence law that gave the government powers to disband fan groups earlier that month.

==== Death of Julien Quemener ====
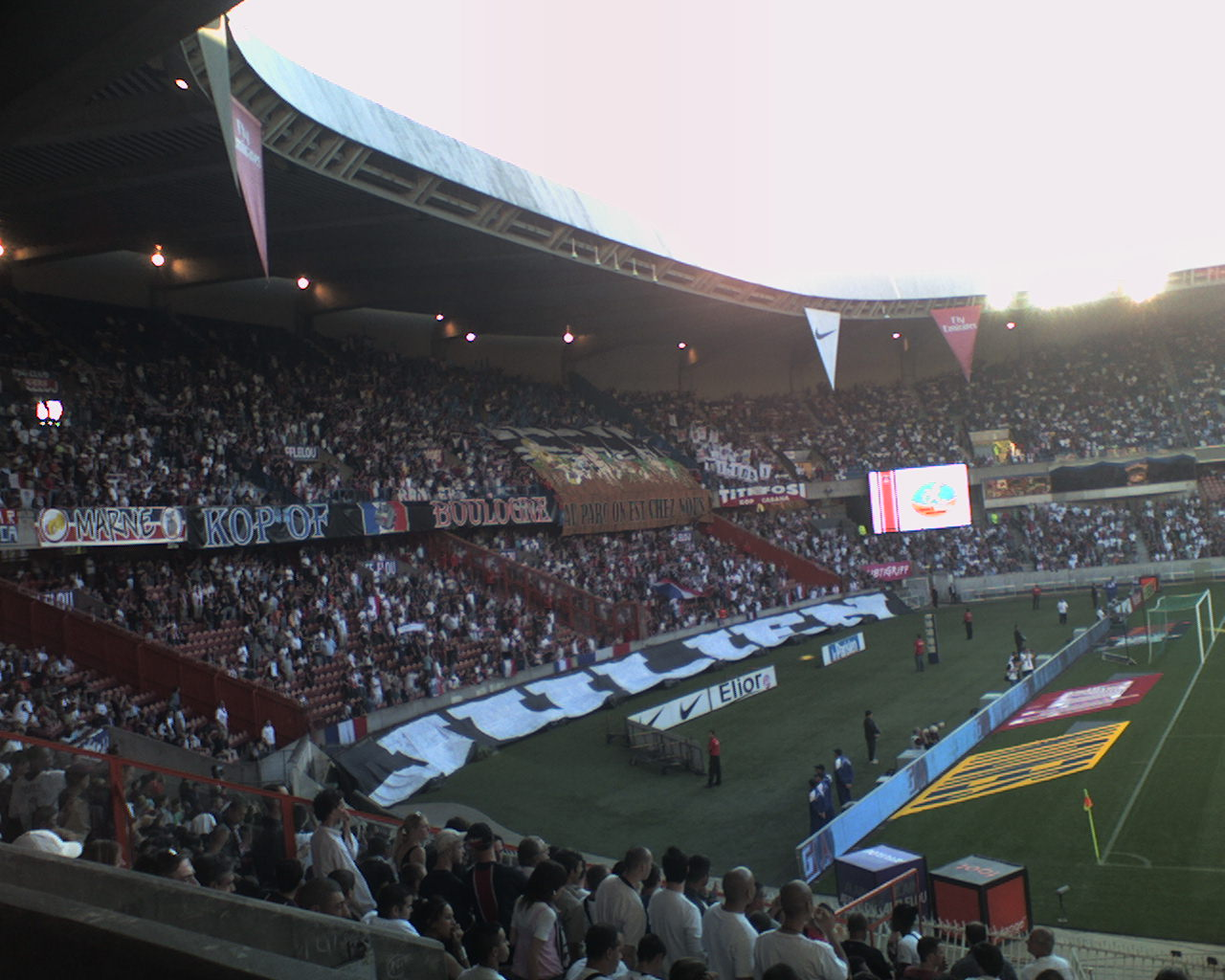
A KoB banner in memory of Julien Quemener in August 2007.

PSG officials hoped for a return to peace with the dissolution of the Tigris after many months of violent conflict, but they suffered a rude awakening in November 2006. Following a UEFA Europa League defeat to Israeli club Hapoel Tel Aviv at the Parc des Princes, KoB hooligans took to the streets and attacked Jewish fans. A French-Jewish Hapoel fan, Yaniv Hazout, was chased and separated from his friends. He was surrounded, threatened, and subjected to a barrage of anti-Semitic and racial insults until a black plainclothes police officer of Antillean origin, Antoine Granomort, intervened to help him. He was not wearing a police uniform and was racially harassed and then attacked by Boulogne radicals.

Granomort attempted to disperse the group using tear gas but was quickly overpowered, punched and kicked, and knocked to the ground. He subsequently drew his firearm and discharged a shot, seriously wounding Mounir Douchaer and fatally shooting Julien Quemener. Both men were members of the Boulogne Boys, highlighting the group's connections to the violent right-wing elements of PSG's KoB. Amid the ensuing confusion, Granomort and Hazout managed to take refuge in a nearby McDonald's. The establishment was subsequently attacked by members of the crowd, who smashed its windows and chanted racist slogans. Police reinforcements eventually arrived and dispersed the gathering.

This incident shocked France. It was only the second fan-related death in the country, following that of a fan killed by a flare in 1984. The media and politicians blamed the KoB, known for its racist and violent supporters since the late 1970s. In turn, PSG supporters and French fans in general considered Quemener a martyr. They questioned the police version of events and demanded a full investigation into Granomort's claim of self-defense, also denying that Quemener was a neo-Nazi or a hooligan.

Days later, hundreds of PSG supporters organized a march in Quemener's memory behind a black banner reading "May Justice Prevail." They gathered at the Parc des Princes and marched through the city in silence to the spot where he died. PSG's league match against Toulouse was postponed for security reasons, and the Boulogne remained closed until further notice. In February 2011, after more than four years of investigation, Antoine Granomort was acquitted of murder in self-defense.

Following Quemener's death, security measures were tightened, including stadium bans and police checks on match days. Nicolas Sarkozy, who was running for president at the time, pledged to rid PSG of racists and hooligans through match bans, anti-terrorism legislation and increased video surveillance in stadiums. These measures contributed to a relative ceasefire between the two stands, and a truce was signed in 2008. Its terms included a ban on political symbols and foreign flags in the stands.

==== Dissolution of Boulogne Boys ====
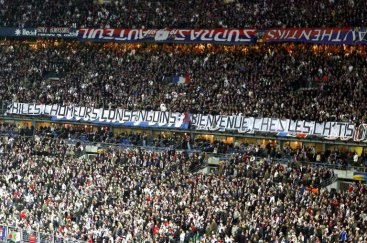
The controversial Boulogne Boys banner in 2008.

Already under scrutiny by authorities following the death of one of their members, the Boulogne Boys outraged France during the 2008 Coupe de la Ligue final in March 2008. They unfurled a banner referring to Lens fans as pedophiles, unemployed, and incestuous. Lens, a poor and underdeveloped area of France, was the subject of the film Welcome to the North. The banner's message was certainly offensive, but no more so than others displayed by the Boys in the past, including a very explicit one during the 2003–04 season that read "Long live sodomy" after several consecutive PSG victories against Marseille. It was the presence of newly elected French President Nicolas Sarkozy in the stands that sealed the fate of the ultra group.

In April 2008, French Interior Minister Michèle Alliot-Marie dissolved the Boys, bringing an end to one of France's most historic supporter groups. She had previously disbanded Commando Pirate, Army Korps and Firebirds in the early 1990s. In response, the KoB displayed a banner reading: "Disinformation, sensationalism, anti-Parisianism. Welcome to the media!" Many KoB members anticipated the potential consequences of the dissolution, arguing that without the Boys, their members would become independent and therefore harder to control. Shortly afterwards, another historic KoB group, Gavroches, dissolved itself.

The Boys, despite the violent potential of some of its members, played a regulatory role within the Boulogne stand, limiting the influence of other groups focused on hooliganism and the spread of xenophobic ideologies. Without them, Casual Firm with the support of politicized groups Milice Paris and Commando Loubard, as well as PAC, Section Cigogne and Layache Family, had free rein to control the KoB, while the club and the French authorities lost their interlocutors, leading to renewed conflicts with Auteuil. In this 2007–08 season, in which PSG barely escaped relegation, there were also hooligans who invaded the training ground to show their discontent with the club's results, threatening players and damaging their cars.

The dissolution of Tigris did not affect Auteuil as much as it did the Boys in Boulogne, and the emergence of new ultra groups during the second half of the 2000s soon brought the rivalry with Boulogne back to the forefront. Alongside Lutece and Supras, there were now ATKS and PSP in Section G, and Grinta Paris in place of Tigris. The VAG grew ever more numerous and audacious, increasingly irritating the KoB. At the forefront of this new generation was KST, a subgroup of the Supras. Brandishing Algerian and Palestinian flags, and using Antifa imagery as their logo (a masked man firing a slingshot), they embodied the growing politicization and leftist radicalization of Auteuil, antagonizing Boulogne. Like Tigris before them, KST responded to racism in the stadium by confronting Boulogne hooligans.

==== Death of Yann Lorence ====
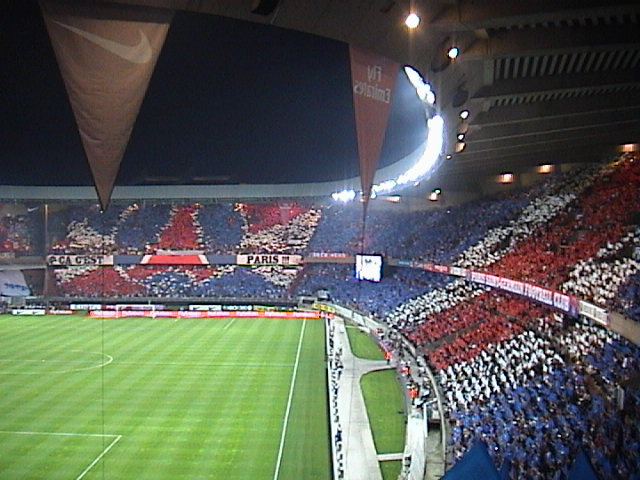
Tifo by PSG fans before Plan Leproux.

In September 2008, tensions between Boulogne and Auteuil resurfaced following an away match against Saint-Étienne. Clashes broke out in the parking lot of the Stade Geoffroy-Guichard after Supras and ATKS supporters reportedly retaliated against xenophobic provocations by KoB hooligans and Brigade Paris, an ally of Section K. Just days earlier, several of these groups had signed an agreement with PSG pledging to combat violence and racism, in return for lower season ticket prices for the 2009–10 season. As club officials debated whether to uphold the agreement, representatives of both stands met shortly afterwards in an attempt to ease tensions, which subsequently subsided for about a year. They even joined forces against hooligans from Twente in December 2008 and Marseille in October 2009.

The war resumed with renewed vigor during an away match against Bordeaux in December 2009, when a KoB member displayed a flag bearing a Celtic cross surrounded by Auteuil fans. Supras took this as a provocation and attacked him. He proved to be an influential figure in Boulogne and vowed revenge on the VA. In January 2010, during a trip to Lille, a contingent of 200 hooligans attacked members of Auteuil, notably Supras and ATKS, who were ejected at half-time by police. Days later, against Monaco at the Parc des Princes, the KoB taunted Supras by chanting "Supras, Supras, fuck you". The VA responded in kind: "Boulogne, Boulogne, fuck you."

Revenge and hatred had taken hold of the stadium; Boulogne and Auteuil could no longer stand each other. Tigris was gone, but other VA supporters had also turned violent, while racism in the KoB was out of control. Unlike Tigris during the 2005–06 season, Supras enjoyed the support of Grinta and Lutece in Auteuil, as well as ATKS and PSP in Section G, in their clash against Boulogne, mainly featuring KoB hooligans, but also former Boulogne Boys members and Tifo e Stupido, group which replaced the Boys in the stand. In February 2010, two hours before a home against Marseille, the fratricidal war between the KoB and the VA reached a point of no return. A large group of Boulogne hooligans attacked the Auteuil fans, chasing them to the stadium entrance, all under the watchful eye of the CRS riot police, who failed to intervene. Alerted by the situation, many VA fans already in the stadium left the stands to lead a counterattack, which culminated in the lynching of Yann Lorence, a member of Casual Firm. The club immediately reacted by banning all its fans from travelling to away games.

Original press reports claimed that Yann Lorence was peacefully leaving a bar when he was attacked by Auteuil fans. Likewise, PSG president Robin Leproux claimed that Lorence had been caught in the middle of the fight. Sources at Boulogne defended these theories, stating that Lorence had distanced himself from Casual Firm. Sources at Auteuil, on the other hand, denied these allegations and stated that Lorence did take part in the fight. Lorence died from his injuries in March 2010. Two men, Jeremy Banh and Romain Lafon, were later charged with manslaughter. Lafon denied involvement in the incident, while Banh admitted in police interview to kicking the victim before retreating from the fight. In November 2016, Banh was convicted of Lorence's murder and received a five-year prison sentence, while Lafon was acquitted. His death marked the end of the Kop of Boulogne and the Virage Auteuil.

=== Plan Leproux ===
==== Dissolution of Supras Auteuil ====
In April 2010, the French government dissolved Commando Loubard and Milice Paris from Boulogne, Supras Auteuil and Grinta Paris from Auteuil, and Authentiks from the Paris stand. PSG president Robin Leproux and the club also began work on implementing an anti-violence plan. As details began to leak out, including the cancellation of all season tickets for Boulogne, Auteuil, Section G and Section K, around 1,000 fans protested at the Parc des Princes before the club's final match of the 2009–10 season against Montpellier in May 2010.

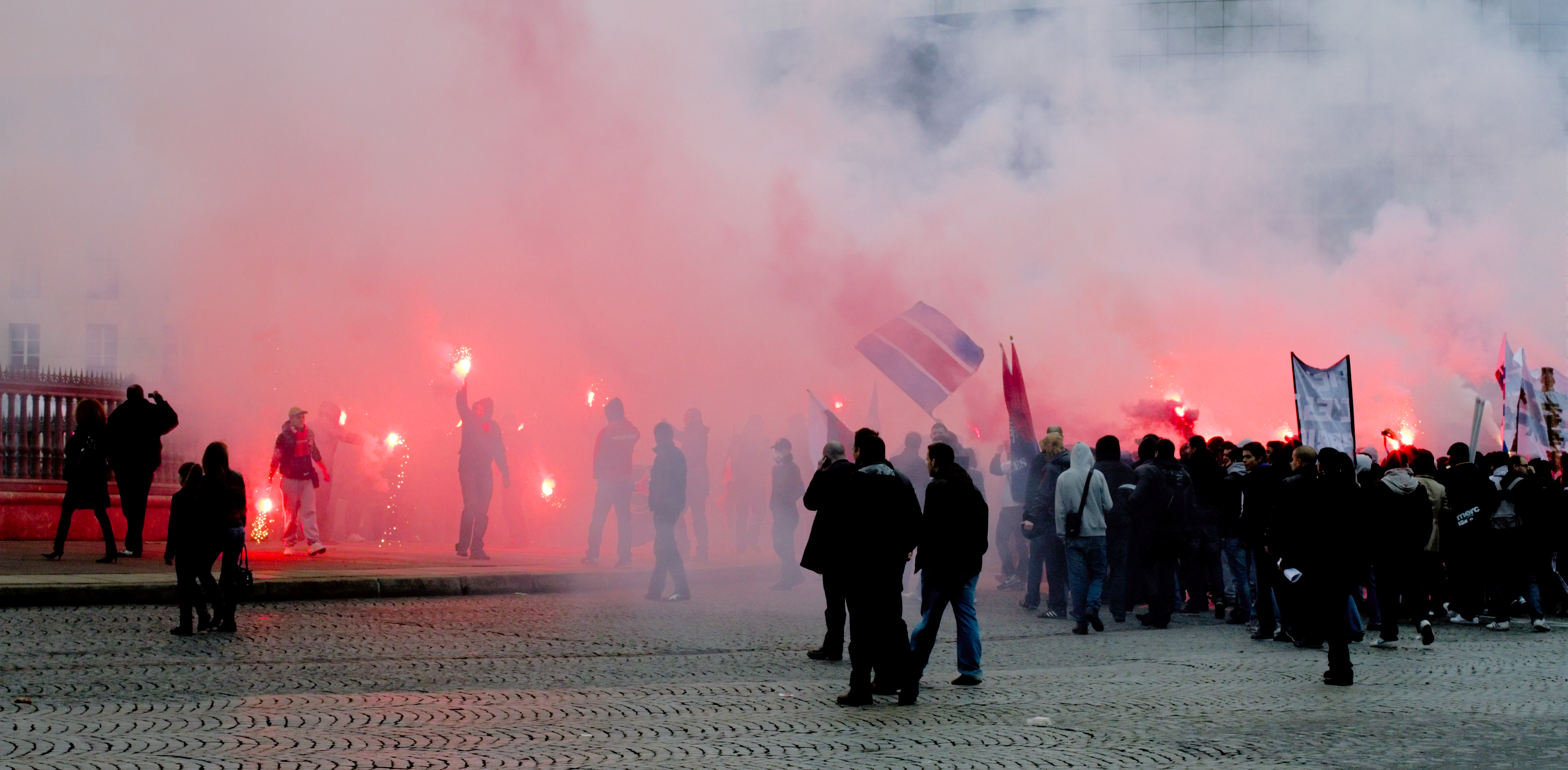
PSG fans protesting against the club in March 2011.

During the match, groups from Auteuil and Boulogne threw hundreds of flares onto the pitch, forcing play to be stopped for several minutes, with Lutece unfurling a banner that simply read "This Is The End". Gatherings in the stands were prohibited, and most groups became obsolete and disbanded, including Kriek, Titans, and Lutece from Auteuil; Rangers, PAC, Casual Firm, Section Cigogne, Layache Family, and Tifo e Stupido from Boulogne; and Brigade Paris and Puissance Paris from the Paris stand.

Officially called Tous PSG (All PSG), but known as the Plan Leproux, it marked the end of organized support for 15,000 fans, of whom only around 400 were hooligans. PSG and the Parc des Princes suffered the consequences in terms of atmosphere, with one of Europe's most feared stadiums now subdued. Furthermore, PSG owners Colony Capital, who had bought the club from Canal+ in 2006, were looking to sell it, and had been in negotiations with Qatar Sports Investments (QSI) for some time. Their aim was to drastically improve the club's brand image to facilitate its takeover. Nicolas Sarkozy himself reportedly intervened to achieve this.

Former Auteuil groups KST, Microbes and Karsud were the only ones to resist the intense repression and persecution that followed. KST and Microbes, originally two subgroups of Supras, also managed to survive the dissolution of their parent association. Many Auteuil and Boulogne fans formed a group called Liberté Pour les Abonnés (LPA) in 2010 and boycotted matches until they were able to choose where to sit again. Gradually, other groups emerged, such as Le Combat Continue (LCC) in 2011, Nautecia in 2012, Parias Cohortis in 2013 and Lista Nera Paris (LNP) in 2014. During the 2011–12 season, KST, along with LPA, Karsud and Microbes, led protests against PSG's policies, boycotting the Parc des Princes and campaigning for the return of season tickets. Present at most away matches, they managed to unite former KoB and VA members with the new generation eager to discover the ultra movement.

==== Qatari takeover and women's team ====
The club continued the renovation of Auteuil and Boulogne, removing murals and commemorative plaques made by ultras. Only 22,689 spectators, roughly half the crowd of the previous year, turned up for PSG's first match of the 2010–11 season, and attendance remained low. By January 2011, PSG again allowed groups of supporters into the stands, provided they agreed to Charte 12, a strict set of rules and regulations. The first to sign Charte 12 were Hoolicool, followed by Titi-Fosi and Vikings 27 a month later. Les Amis du PSG, PSG Grand Sud, and Handicap PSG were also recognized as official groups by the club. They were all family-friendly groups and were not located in either Boulogne or Auteuil. They were called "collaborators" by former KoB and VA members. PSG also partnered with anti-racism organization SOS Racisme to help manage security at matches and track any racist behavior.

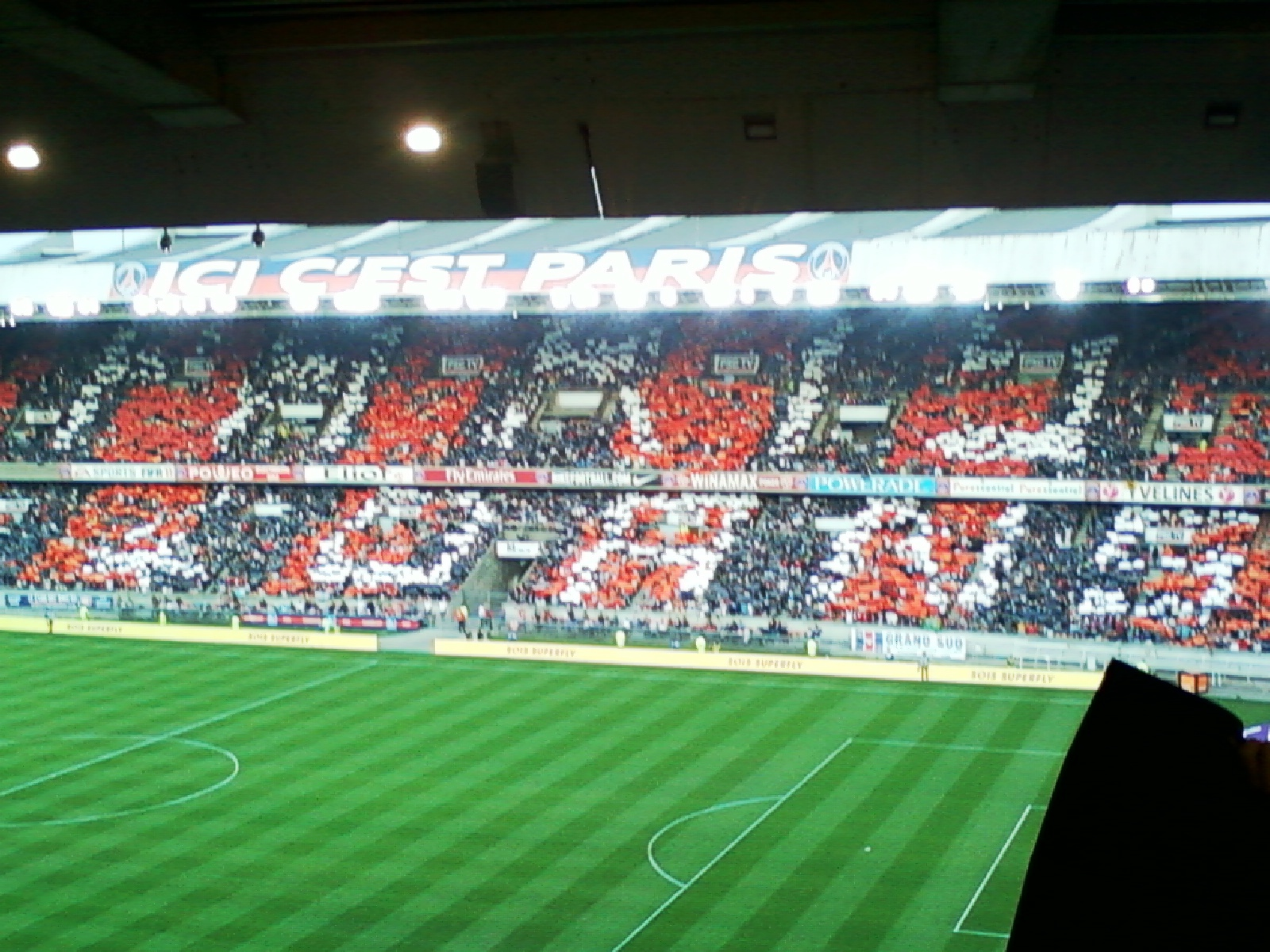
Failed tifo attempt during Plan Leproux.

With the backing of the Qatari government, QSI eventually acquired PSG in May 2011. Attendances soared in the 2011–12 season thanks to big-money signings such as Javier Pastore and a promising Champions League project to develop PSG into a major European team. LPA welcomed the Qatari owners and their efforts, but maintained that a major club was nothing without its fans. Fan violence decreased considerably following Plan Leproux, but incidents persisted, making QSI hesitant to allow ultras back into the Parc des Princes. In May 2013, the club's league title celebrations were cut short after a clash between PSG fans and CRS riot police left 30 people injured and 21 arrested. Between 2010 and 2016, they also fought with supporters of Athletic Bilbao, Dinamo Zagreb, Bayer Leverkusen and Chelsea.

Unable to support the men's team, the LPA urged the ultras to focus on other PSG teams and they began attending their games, especially the women's team, but also the youth and handball teams. Unlike some fans who decided to cheer on other Parisian clubs such as Paris FC or Créteil, LPA noticed that there was not much enthusiasm surrounding the women and decided to stick with PSG, supporting them in France and abroad, from league clashes against rivals OL Lyonnes to the 2014–15 UEFA Women's Champions League (UWCL) semi-finals against Wolfsburg and the 2015 final in Berlin, where they lost to Eintracht Frankfurt.

A marriage of convenience at first, the ultras began to greatly enjoy supporting the women for three main reasons: their proximity compared to the men, allowing them to easily approach the players; their appreciation for the fans, always thanking them after each match; and their solidarity with the ultra movement, publicly supporting the return to the Parc des Princes for the men's team's matches in interviews and on social media, in contrast to the male players, whose communication was more controlled by the club.

=== Collectif Ultras Paris ===
==== Rebuilding the Auteuil stand ====
The Parisian ultra movement slowly began to reorganize. The remaining fan groups would meet up with the team at the training ground whenever possible and attend away matches, usually outside of France. Eventually, they joined forces and formed the Collective Ultras Paris (CUP) in May 2016 with the aim of returning to the Parc des Princes. The founding members were VA groups KST, Microbes and Karsud, as well as those created after the implementation of Plan Leproux: Parias, LPA, LNP, Nautecia, and LCC. KoB groups declined to partake in the initiative, but Boulogne fans remain in the CUP as individuals. KST member Romain Mabille was elected president of the CUP a few weeks after its founding. In October 2016, the ultras returned to the Parc des Princes for the 2–0 home league win over Bordeaux. Some 150 CUP members were allowed into Auteuil after a six-year absence.

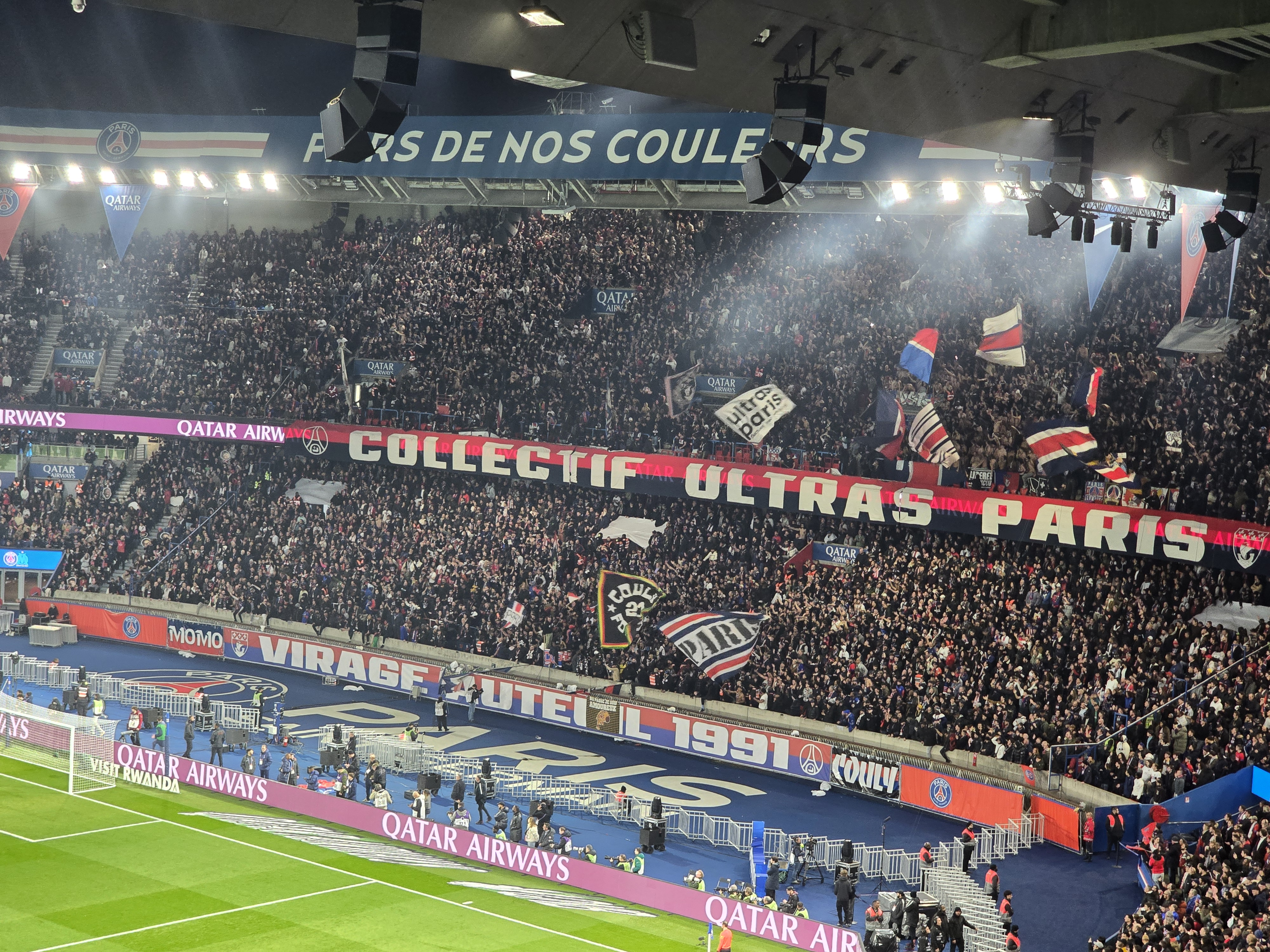
Banner of the CUP in February 2026.

The left corner of Auteuil Blue, previously home to Lutece, first accommodated LPA and LCC. Beriz Crew later replaced LPA alongside LCC. Nautecia were located in the right corner of Auteuil Blue, the former area of the Supras. It was most recently occupied by Parias. The center of Auteuil Blue housed LNP, then Microbes, later Ferveur Parisienne, and now Urban Paris. Leading subgroup KST are found in Auteuil Red, a territory that formerly belonged to Tigris. KST have two subgroups, Jeunesse K-Soce and Old Block 1993, as well as former members of Tigris and Supras. The away stand also changed location, going from Section F, next to Auteuil, to Section K.

The CUP have continued to support the women's side; they were at the Parc for the 2016–17 UEFA Women's Champions League matches against Bayern Munich and Barcelona. 300 ultras travelled to Cardiff to cheer on the team in the 2017 final. In April 2017, PSG ultras vandalized the stadium hosting the 2017 Coupe de la Ligue final, leading to the departure of LNP and Microbes from the CUP, as well as the exclusion of Karsud in May 2017. Romain Mabille called Karsud "hooligans" in a statement. Banned from all PSG matches since then, Karsud have continued to clash with rival fans and the CUP. Following a falling out with KST, the LNP also dissolved in 2017, as did Microbes. Urban Paris joined the CUP that year, and Ferveur Parisienne, which emerged from Microbes, filled the other vacancy in January 2019.

In August 2017, the club allowed the ultras to hold season tickets together in the VA, something not seen since 2010. PSG also authorized the CUP to redo the murals in the corridors of Auteuil in June 2018. Fans began painting them in 2005, but they were erased in 2010 during Plan Leproux. These paintings paid tribute to groups, deceased members and former players. The club gave CUP permission to display their banner on Auteuil Blue billboards in August 2018. Other highlights included two Dragon Ball tifos at the Parc. In February 2018, the CUP portrayed Goku, dressed in his traditional uniform with the PSG logo, and urged their players to "obtain the seventh crystal ball," referring to the club's potential seventh league title. In October 2019, the Parisian ultras depicted Shenlong with a PSG scarf and, at his feet, seven crystal balls. Each ball bore the date of PSG's league titles. The CUP also unfurled the banner of Marseille's Commando Ultra upside down. Stolen by Tigris in 1998, it was rumored to have been in the possession of several groups over the past 21 years, including Casual Firm and Karsud.

==== Internal tensions and violence ====
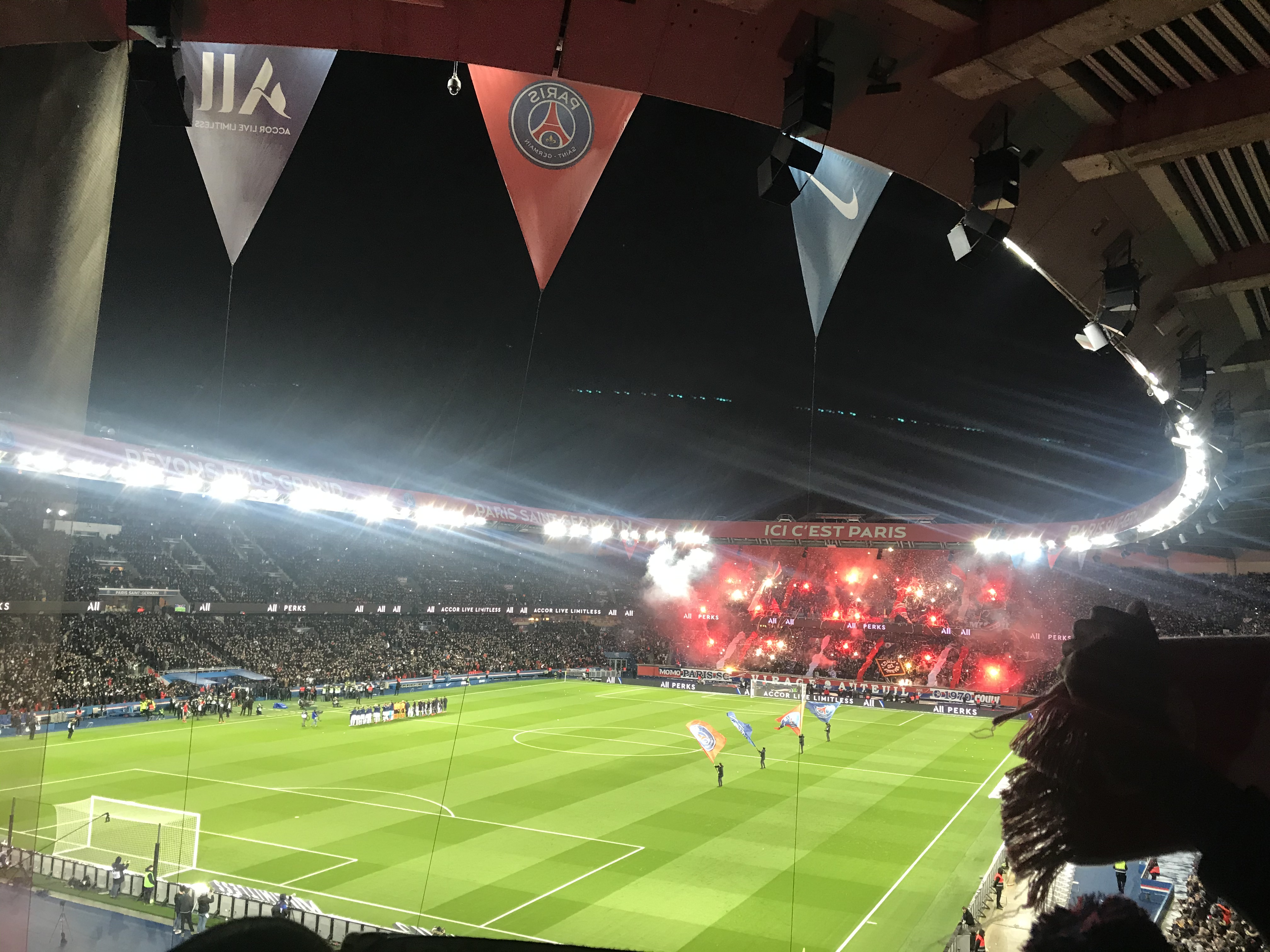
Flare show against Lyon in February 2020.

Tensions between the club and the CUP arose in October 2019, when the latter announced a boycott of all matches until the removal of security company OLIPS from Auteuil, citing "provocations from people who have never digested the return of the ultras." The CUP, along with Boulogne groups Block Parisii and Paname Rebirth skipped the team's next match. In November 2019, OLIPS announced the end of its collaboration with the club, and the CUP ended its boycott.

In October 2020, Romain Mabille announced his departure from the CUP, which he had led since its creation in 2016. Banners displayed around Paris ahead of the September match against Marseille created tension between subgroups, as they were not collectively discussed or validated, and sparked widespread outrage. The unilateral decision by a CUP subgroup to praise PSG striker Edinson Cavani with a banner was the final straw for Mabille, who was among those opposed to paying tribute to him.

Nicolas Boffredo was elected as the new president a few days later. He joined Supras Auteuil in 2002 and was also a founding member of KST in 2006 and the CUP in 2016. In November 2021, the CUP celebrated the 30th anniversary of the VA, created in 1991. The tifo paid tribute to Supras, Lutece Falco, and Tigris Mystic, the three main groups in the stand before the creation of the CUP, as well as its seven subgroups: KST, LCC, LPA, Nautecia, Parias, Ferveur Parisienne, and Urban Paris.

Incidents of hooliganism were frequent between 2017 and 2021. PSG ultras clashed with Bayern Munich fans in Germany in December 2017. A French fan received medical treatment for a head injury. In April 2018, during 2018 Coupe de la Ligue final between PSG and Monaco, the KoB and Karsud celebrated Boulogne's 40th anniversary with a clash with the CUP on the streets of Bordeaux. Two months earlier, in a statement, the KoB referenced the Great Replacement conspiracy theory: "In the end, as in France, we have been replaced. (And for the worst)," alluding to the multi-ethnic Auteuil replacing the white Boulogne. In October 2018, the CUP clashed with Karsud and twinned Red Star Belgrade hooligan firm Delije near the Parc des Princes. The club imposed a one-year stadium ban and canceled the season tickets of the 100 CUP members involved, most of them from KST. After another Champions League failure in March 2019, this time against Manchester United, the ultras stormed a training session at the Parc and proceeded to boo and insult the players.

In April 2019, after the 2019 Coupe de France final, PSG and Rennes fans clashed. In November 2019, the CUP and Karsud fought with Club Brugge supporters. A week later, KST attacked spectators wearing Marseille apparel during Jul's concert at the Accor Arena. Also that month, PSG ultras assaulted Rennes fans in Glasgow. In December 2019, the CUP and Block Parisii were involved in a brawl against Galatasaray fans, leaving one PSG supporter with a head trauma and one Turkish fan with a hand injury. Karsud clashed with Nantes fans in February 2020 and assaulted a member of Rennes group Roazhon Celtik Kop (RCK) in September 2021, stealing their banner.

==== Discontent with the club ====
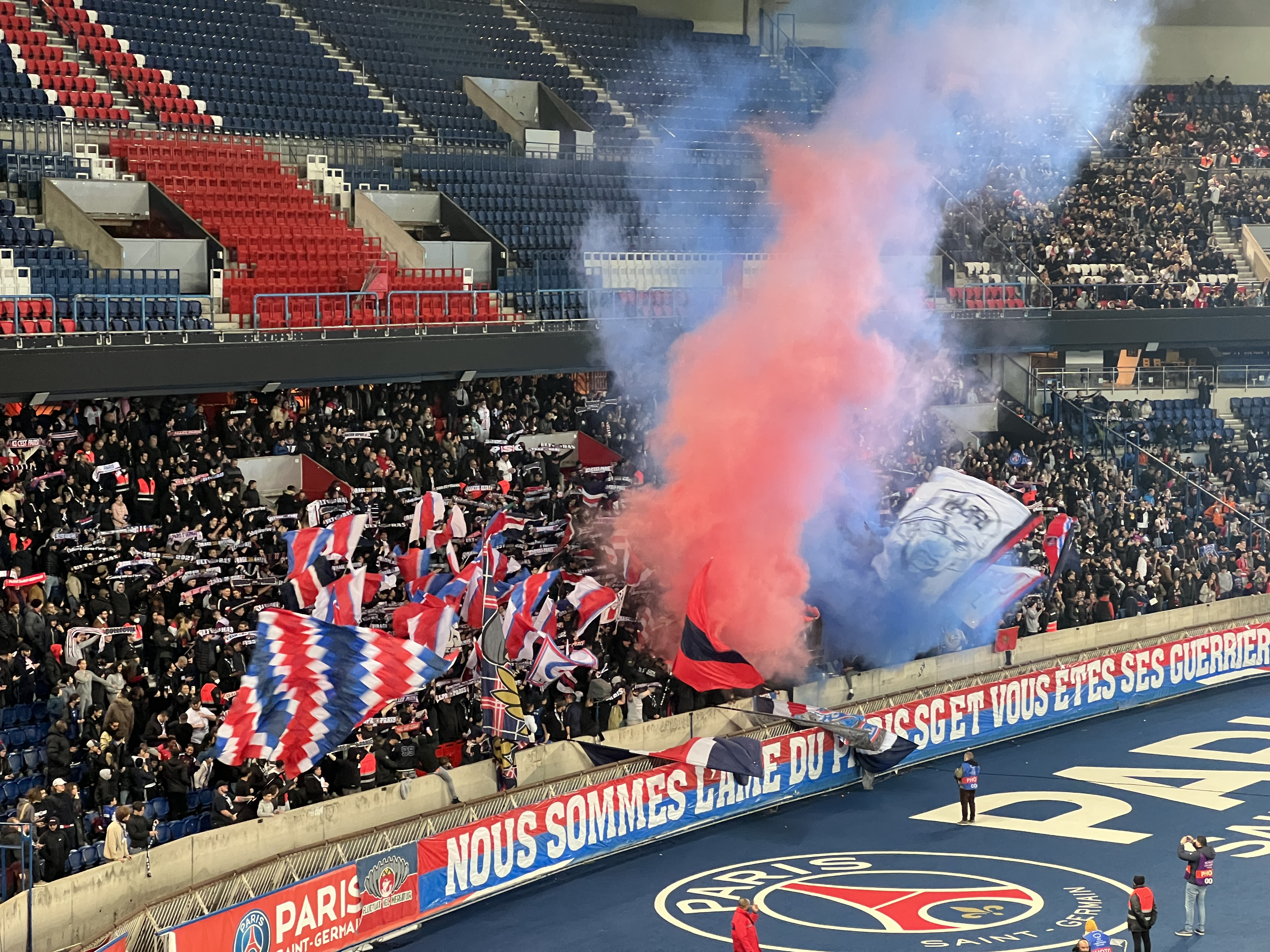
The CUP at a women's UWCL match in February 2022.

In February 2022, the CUP launched a series of protests against the club's management and male players, displaying a banner reading "Our patience has limits" during PSG's away match against Lille. This was followed by a statement criticising the club's operations, including the men's team's inconsistent sporting strategy centred on star players, frequent coaching changes, the lack of a consistent playing style, and management's neglect of the PSG Academy and women's team.

Protests continued during PSG's home match against Rennes. After being absent for the first 25 minutes and then silent for the remaining 20 minutes of the first half, the ultras unfurled several banners. "Disrespectful managers, players without ambition, shirts without our colors. PSG's only treble this season," read the most prominent one. Another banner questioned whether it was time for sporting director Leonardo to leave the club, criticizing him for overpaying uncommitted players.

Unrest intensified after PSG were eliminated from the Champions League at the last-16 for the fourth time in six seasons in March. The CUP issued a statement calling for a complete reorganization of the club, including the departure of president Al-Khelaifi. During PSG's next home game against Bordeaux, the fans greeted manager Mauricio Pochettino and the team with whistles. A week later, on a visit to Monaco, the CUP decorated its empty stands with a banner: "Like you, we're on vacation." In their home match against Lorient in April, the ultras remained silent throughout the match and displayed their main banner upside down.

Amid the protests, Romain Mabille was re-elected president of the CUP, two years after resigning. Facing arch-rivals Marseille at home, the VA refrained from supporting the players. The CUP took another step forward at Angers, leaving the stadium in the 70th minute. In the following match, Paris secured their tenth Ligue 1 title with a draw against Lens, but the fans remained silent until the 75th minute, when they went outside to celebrate the title without the players. The CUP only halted its protests in favor of the women's team. They flocked to the Parc for the UCL quarter-finals against Bayern Munich in March, and then they were part of the club record 43,254 spectators in attendance for the semi-finals against Lyon in April. Before kick-off, they unfurled a banner reading: "Proud of our colors and proud of our female players."

==== Restructuring amid protests ====
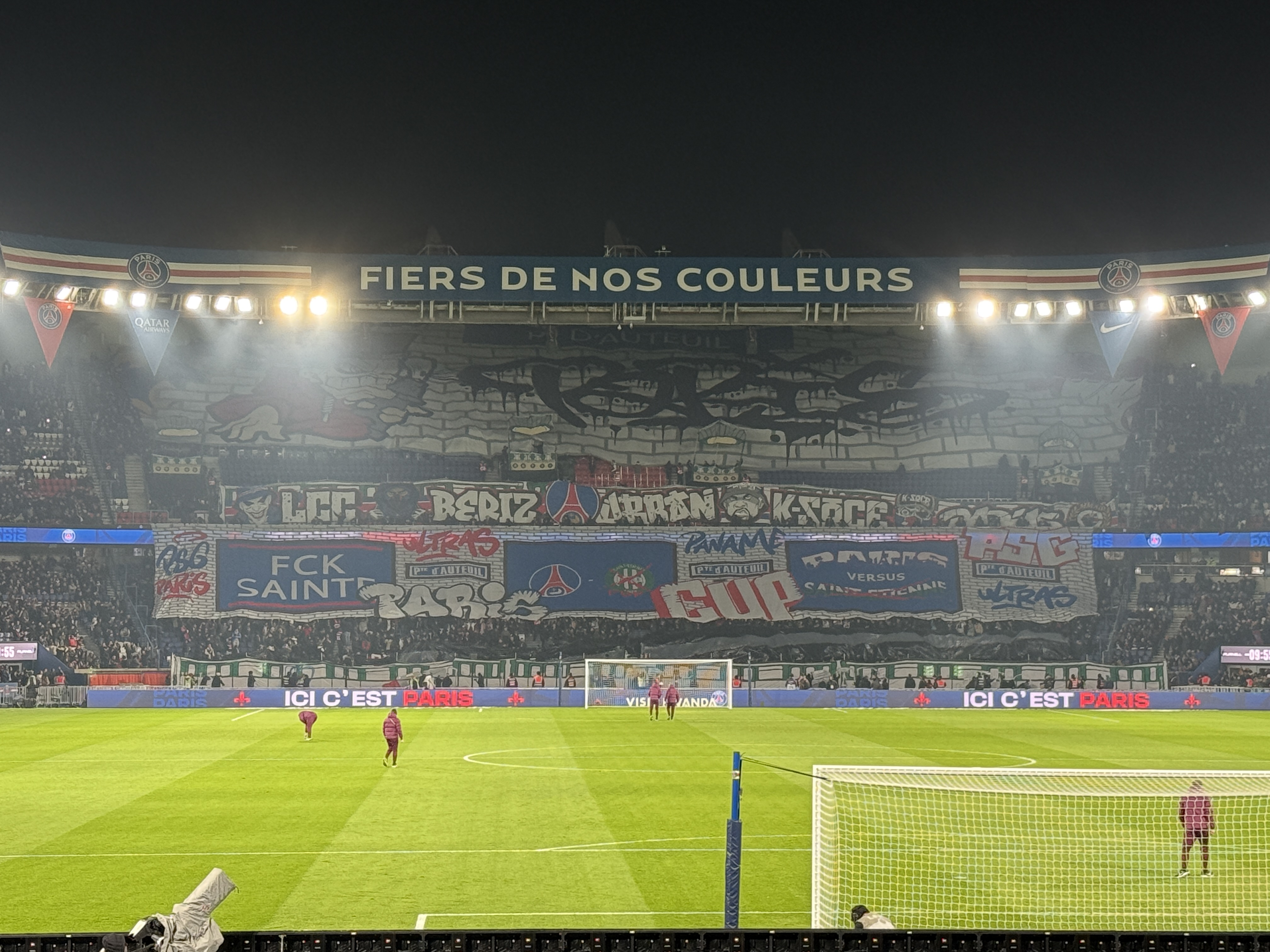
Tifo depicting the five CUP subgroups in 2025.

The CUP finally decided to bury the hatchet during PSG's final match of the season against Metz at the Parc des Princes in May. With assurances from the club about major changes for next season, including the renewal of Kylian Mbappé's contract renewal, contract, the ultras raised their main banner the right way up and cheered the team on in the second half. However, some groups wanted to adopt a more radical approach, while others feared exclusion from the stadium. In April 2022, CUP leaders KST, with the support of Parias and LCC, expelled LPA and Nautecia, two other founding members, from the CUP.

Additionally, CUP subgroup Ferveur Parisienne were disbanded by the French government in December 2022. Along with Karsud, they were involved in a brawl at the Stade Charléty in December 2021, during the Coupe de France match between Paris FC and Lyon, for which PSG suspended them for several matches at the Parc des Princes. Brandishing iron bars and nunchucks, they attacked Lyon fans at halftime. The decree also listed twenty other acts of violence committed between November 2019 and October 2022.

Nautecia announced its self-dissolution in July 2023, while LPA did so in August 2023. The CUP stated, in response to Nautecia's statement, that they "will never allow hooligan gangrene to re-emerge in Paris." A new subgroup, Beriz Crew, joined the CUP in July and took over LPA's physical location in the stands in August.

In May 2023, following PSG's poor run of results since the beginning of the year, as well as off-field issues, most notably Lionel Messi's unauthorized trip to Saudi Arabia and his subsequent suspension, the CUP gathered outside the club's headquarters, demanding the resignation of the board of directors. Star players Messi and Neymar, coach Christophe Galtier, and president Al-Khelaifi were also targets of criticism. Other fans protested outside Neymar's home, leading to the revocation of the CUP's tickets for the trip to Troyes. The ultras vowed to boycott all matches until further notice, but quickly reversed their decision after meetings with the club's board, who assured them of positive changes, such as the return of PSG's historic home jersey, affordable tickets, and a coherent sporting plan focused on signing team players rather than big names.

==== Tifos on European nights ====
There have been an array of tifos created by the CUP since their return to the Parc des Princes in 2016, but their artwork against AC Milan in October 2023 has been one of the most impressive. Leading up to another decisive Champions League match for the club, the ultras organized a tifo that required the cooperation of the Auteuil and Boulogne stands, at opposite ends of the pitch. It depicted Jean-Paul Belmondo, famous French actor and a founder of the club, pointing a gun from PSG's goal at a Milan-themed devil behind the other. "I have my sights set on them like Belmondo," they added on a banner. The showpiece helped propel PSG supporters into the conversation for the best fan group in European football.

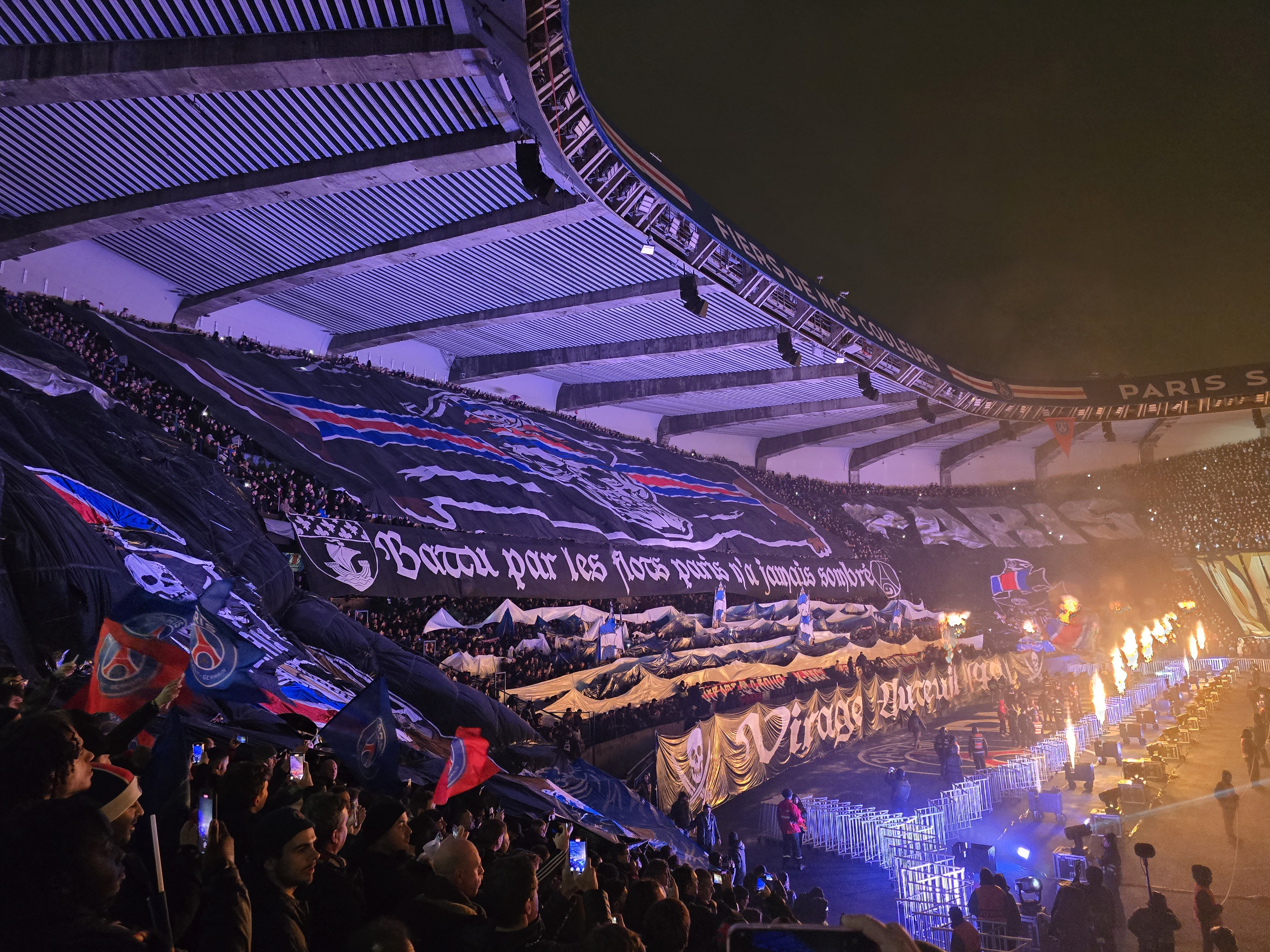
Tifo ahead of the UCL win over Manchester City in January 2025.

PSG fans, however, tangled with the Italians in the stands during the match. 50 AC Milan ultras took revenge on the eve of the return match in November 2023. They attacked the Parisians in Milan, stabbing one of them twice in the leg. There were also clashes between PSG supporters and police. An officer was stabbed in the leg and the alleged culprit was arrested.

The CUP unveiled a Star Wars-themed tifo ahead of PSG's quarter-final match against Barcelona at the Parc des Princes in April 2024. As the musical theme of Star Wars played in the stadium, the ultras unfolded a tifo of Darth Vader donning a Barça scarf at the Boulogne stand, along with a message below it that read, "Fight the enemy, you must." A tifo of Yoda, holding a red and blue lightsaber, followed shortly after at the Auteuil stand. Underneath it was the following banner: "Win! For us you must."

In November 2024, the CUP unfurled a tifo in support of Palestine over its conflict with Israel before a UCL match against Atlético Madrid at the Parc des Princes. The French government criticized the tifo, which was accompanied by a "Free Palestine" banner reading: "War on the pitch, but peace in the world." PSG claimed to be unaware of any plans for this banner and added that it is "firmly opposed to any political message." The club banned the CUP from displaying tifos for the remainder of 2024. However, UEFA announced that PSG would not face disciplinary proceedings, as it only bans political messages deemed insulting or provocative.

The CUP were back in action for the crunch Champions League clash versus Manchester City in January 2025. A giant tifo, displaying across three stands, conveyed the message "Fluctuat Nec Mergitur," which means "Rocked [by the waves], but [Paris] has never sunk" and symbolizes the resilience of Paris in challenging times. About 400 supporters from the Auteuil stand rallied in the Boulogne stand to encourage the crowd there too. PSG won their first Champions League title that season, defeating Inter Milan in the final. During the match, Parisian fans set off fireworks, displayed a banner reading "UEFA Mafia," damaged areas of the stadium, and invaded the pitch at the final whistle. The club was fined nearly €150,000.

==== Boulogne takeover ====
Block Parisii, the first Boulogne group to emerge following the implementation of the Plan Leproux, was founded in October 2017. Its approximately 100 members established themselves in Boulogne Bleu, the section previously occupied by the Boulogne Boys. They were subsequently joined by Résistance Parisienne in March 2019 and Paname Rebirth in April 2019. Rebirth initially occupied Boulogne Red before relocating to Boulogne Blue alongside Block and Résistance. Adopting a more confrontational stance than the other groups, Rebirth protested against the club's random seating policy in July 2019. The three groups, all following the Italian-style ultra tradition, unsuccessfully attempted to revive the KoB. PSG declined to officially recognise them, citing concerns that their re-emergence could reignite tensions between Boulogne and Auteuil.

KoB atmosphere in September 2009, before Plan Leproux.

Initially, the CUP viewed Block with suspicion, believing its members to be right-wing extremists and racists. However, discussions during away matches convinced the CUP that Block had no links to the KoB and instead promoted an apolitical, non-religious and anti-violence stance. This was reflected in its slogan, "No Politics, No Religion, Just Paris SG", and its multiethnic membership. Relations improved in March 2018, when CUP members collaborated with Block in Boulogne. The club subsequently authorized the use of drums, megaphones and flags, although banners and tifos remained prohibited.

In November 2021, PSG suspended all three groups amid concerns over renewed far-right activity and links to former KoB members. Rebirth and Résistance received six-month bans, while Block was barred from the Parc des Princes and away matches for a year. The suspensions followed several incidents, including controversial banners displayed by Rebirth, KoB stickers in the stands, an attempted confrontation between Block members and Lyon supporters, and an assault on Rebirth members by KoB hooligans. Rebirth disbanded later that year, Résistance dissolved in 2023, and Block shifted its support to PSG's youth teams.

In July 2025, the CUP announced an agreement with PSG to expand into Boulogne for the 2025–26 season, citing Auteuil's full waiting list and the desire to create an atmosphere across both stands. Following the club's approval in August, 500 CUP members moved into Boulogne Blue, bringing flags, drums, megaphones and tifos. The move marked the return of organized support to the section formerly occupied by the Boulogne Boys and later by the unofficial groups. PSG's decision to entrust the stand to the CUP was also intended to limit KoB infiltration and prevent a revival of the historical rivalry between Boulogne and Auteuil. The decision nevertheless divided observers. While some welcomed the prospect of greater unity and a more vibrant stadium atmosphere, others feared it would prevent independent groups from emerging in Boulogne. The arrangement was also considered unusual within the ultra movement, given the historical rivalry and contrasting political identities of the two stands.

==== Parias–Urban feud ====
Tensions between CUP factions Parias Cohortis and Urban Paris have persisted since the 2025 UEFA Champions League final. Parias and Urban have twinnings with Celtic and AIK respectively, whose fanbases are known to be rivals. Prior to the match, played in Munich in May 2025, AIK ultras confronted their Celtic counterparts in the Munich metro. The encounter involved verbal taunts, insults, and minor provocations, but did not escalate further at that time. After the match, Parias encountered Urban in the metro and initiated a confrontation in solidarity with Celtic. The clash was described as violent, involving exchanges of punches, with Parias prevailing in the altercation.

In February 2026, during PSG's league victory over Metz at the Parc des Princes, Urban retaliated against Parias near the stadium and in surrounding traffic. Around 100 members of Urban, associated with the K-Soce Team, ambushed an estimated 15 to 20 Parias members using metal bars, resulting in several injuries and hospitalizations. Subsequently, both Parias and Urban were barred from joining the Virage Auteuil for the Champions League home fixture against Monaco later that month, following an internal decision by the CUP.

Two months later, in April 2026, Parias carried out a retaliatory ambush targeting Urban at a highway rest area while they were traveling to an away match against Angers. The attackers used stones, pyrotechnic devices, and tear gas, causing significant damage to one of the Urban buses, including shattered windows. In response, the CUP leadership canceled the organized trip for more than 500 supporters and instructed all buses to return to Paris.

Following these incidents, PSG excluded Parias until the end of the season. The group could be readmitted the following season on the condition that it remove its most violent members and agree to relocate within the Auteuil stand. It had previously been positioned next to Urban, but the club no longer considered their coexistence viable. Parias and its 80 members rejected these terms. In September 2026, PSG permanently banned the group from the Parc des Princes and from attending the club's away matches.
