= 1971–72 Paris Saint-Germain FC season =

2nd season of Paris Saint-Germain FC

Paris Saint-Germain
1971–72 season
- President: Guy Crescent; Henri Patrelle
- Manager: Pierre Phelipon
- Stadium: Stade Bauer; Stade Yves-du-Manoir
- Ligue 1: 16th (relegated)
- Coupe de France: Round of 64
- Top goalscorer: League: Jean-Claude Bras (12); Michel Prost (12); All: Jean-Claude Bras (12); Michel Prost (12)
- Average home league attendance: 10,030
Home colours	Away colours	Third colours

The 1971–72 season was the 2nd season in the history of Paris Saint-Germain FC. PSG played the majority of their home league matches at the Stade Bauer, while occasionally hosting fixtures at the Stade Yves-du-Manoir, attracting an average of 10,030 spectators per match. The club's president was Guy Crescent until December 1971, when he was succeeded by Henri Patrelle. The team was managed by Pierre Phelipon, with Jean Djorkaeff serving as captain. PSG finished 16th in Ligue 1 and, following their separation from Paris FC at the end of the season, were administratively relegated to Division 3. The club also reached the round of 64 in the Coupe de France. Jean-Claude Bras and Michel Prost were the team's joint top scorers, each netting 12 goals in the league.

== Players ==
=== Squad ===
Players who featured in at least one official match for the club.

Note: Flags indicate national team as defined under FIFA eligibility rules; some limited exceptions apply. Players may hold more than one non-FIFA nationality.

No.	Pos.	Nation	Player
—	GK	FRA	Guy Delhumeau
—	GK	FRA	Camille Choquier
—	DF	FRA	Daniel Guicci
—	DF	BRA	Joel Camargo
—	DF	FRA	Jean Djorkaeff (captain)
—	DF	FRA	Bernard Béréau
—	DF	FRA	Jean-Paul Rostagni
—	DF	FRA	Claude Arribas
—	DF	FRA	Daniel Solas
—	DF	FRA	Roland Mitoraj
—	DF	FRA	Sylvain Léandri

No.	Pos.	Nation	Player
—	MF	FRA	Jean-Louis Leonetti
—	MF	FRA	Jean-Pierre Destrumelle
—	MF	FRA	Bernard Guignedoux
—	MF	FRA	Gérard Hallet
—	FW	FRA	Jacques Rémond
—	FW	FRA	Daniel Horlaville
—	FW	FRA	Jean-Claude Bras
—	FW	FRA	Michel Prost
—	FW	FRA	Jean-Louis Brost
—	FW	ENG	Jantzen Derrick

== Transfers ==
=== Arrivals ===
Players who signed for the club.

Note: Flags indicate national team as defined under FIFA eligibility rules; some limited exceptions apply. Players may hold more than one non-FIFA nationality.

No.	Pos.	Nation	Player
—	GK	FRA	Guy Delhumeau (from Poitiers)
—	DF	FRA	Claude Arribas (on loan from Nantes)
—	DF	POR	Jean-Paul Rostagni (from Bordeaux)
—	DF	FRA	Daniel Solas (from Angoulême)
—	DF	BRA	Joel Camargo (from Santos)
—	DF	FRA	Sylvain Léandri (from Nice)

No.	Pos.	Nation	Player
—	MF	FRA	Jean-Louis Leonetti (from Angoulême)
—	MF	FRA	Gérard Hallet (from Montluçon)
—	FW	ENG	Jantzen Derrick (from Bristol City)
—	FW	FRA	Daniel Horlaville (from Quevilly)
—	FW	TUN	Kamel Ben Mustapha (from Melun)

=== Departures ===
Players who left the club.

Note: Flags indicate national team as defined under FIFA eligibility rules; some limited exceptions apply. Players may hold more than one non-FIFA nationality.

No.	Pos.	Nation	Player
—	DF	POR	Fernando Cruz (Retired)
—	DF	FRA	Jean-Claude Fitte-Duval (Retired)
—	DF	BRA	Joel Camargo (Free agent)
—	MF	FRA	Alain Garillière (Free agent)

No.	Pos.	Nation	Player
—	MF	YUG	Živko Lukić (Free agent)
—	FW	FRA	Thierry Carré (Amiens)
—	FW	FRA	Dominique Delplanque (Free agent)

== Kits ==
The club had no shirt sponsor, and Le Coq Sportif was the kit supplier.

Home	Away	Third

== Competitions ==
=== Overview ===
Competition	First match	Last match	Starting round	Final position	Record							
Competition	First match	Last match	Starting round	Final position	Pld	W	D	L	GF	GA	GD	Win %
Ligue 1	11 August 1971	27 May 1972	Matchday 1	16th	38	10	10	18	51	67	−16	26.32
Coupe de France	23 January 1972		Round of 64	Round of 64	1	0	0	1	0	1	−1	0.00
Total					39	10	10	19	51	68	−17	25.64

Source: Competitions

=== Ligue 1 ===
==== League table ====
Pos	Team	Pld	W	D	L	GF	GA	GD	Pts	Qualification or relegation
14	Metz	38	13	7	18	44	49	−5	33	
15	Reims	38	9	13	16	46	69	−23	31	
16	Paris Saint-Germain (R)	38	10	10	18	51	67	−16	30	Administratively relegated to Division 3 [fr] (Note: Paris Saint-Germain were administratively relegated to Division 3 following their split from Paris FC at the end of the season.)
17	Red Star	38	10	10	18	34	64	−30	30	
18	Lille (R)	38	8	10	20	43	68	−25	26	Relegation to French Division 2

Source: Histoire du PSG
Rules for classification: 1) points; 2) goal difference; 3) number of goals scored.
Victory: 2 points, Draw: 1 point, Defeat: 0 points
(R) Relegated

==== Results by round ====
Round	1	2	3	4	5	6	7	8	9	10	11	12	13	14	15	16	17	18	19	20	21	22	23	24	25	26	27	28	29	30	31	32	33	34	35	36	37	38
Ground	A	H	A	H	A	H	A	H	A	H	A	H	A	H	H	A	H	A	H	A	H	A	H	A	H	A	H	A	H	A	H	A	A	H	A	H	A	H
Result	L	D	W	W	L	D	W	W	L	W	L	L	L	W	L	L	D	L	D	L	L	W	L	D	L	L	D	D	W	D	W	W	L	D	L	L	D	L
Position	19	17	11	6	12	11	9	6	9	7	9	10	12	10	15	14	14	15	15	16	18	17	17	16	16	17	17	16	15	15	15	14	15	15	15	15	15	16

Source: Histoire du PSG
A = Away; H = Home; W = Win; D = Draw; L = Loss

==== Matches ====
11 August 1971 1	Angers	2–0	Paris Saint-Germain	Angers
	Roy 9'; Lecoeur 24'	Report		Stadium: Stade Raymond Kopa; Attendance: 8,230; Referee: André Petit

18 August 1971 2	Paris Saint-Germain	0–0	Bordeaux	Saint-Ouen-sur-Seine
		Report		Stadium: Stade Bauer; Attendance: 11,812; Referee: Robert Wurtz

25 August 1971 3	Nancy	2–3	Paris Saint-Germain	Tomblaine
	Lazarević 47'; Vicq 80'	Report	Bras 38', 67'; Prost 43'	Stadium: Stade Marcel Picot; Attendance: 10,460; Referee: Achille Verbecke

28 August 1971 4	Paris Saint-Germain	4–1	Lille	Saint-Ouen-sur-Seine
	Bras 25', 53'; Hallet 29'; Béréau 63'	Report	Copé 69'	Stadium: Stade Bauer; Attendance: 10,294; Referee: Robert Frauciel

1 September 1971 5	Nantes	6–0	Paris Saint-Germain	Nantes
	Rampillon 14'; Pech 33'; Maas 60', 85'; Marcos 67'; Michel 86'	Report		Stadium: Stade Marcel-Saupin; Attendance: 16,254; Referee: Robert Héliès

11 September 1971 6	Paris Saint-Germain	1–1	Nice	Saint-Ouen-sur-Seine
	Prost 47'	Report	Revelli 80'	Stadium: Stade Bauer; Attendance: 13,952; Referee: André Petit

18 September 1971 7	Saint-Étienne	0–1	Paris Saint-Germain	Saint-Étienne
		Report	Guignedoux 20'	Stadium: Stade Geoffroy-Guichard; Attendance: 14,380; Referee: Jean Maillard

22 September 1971 8	Paris Saint-Germain	4–1	Bastia	Saint-Ouen-sur-Seine
	Bras 45'; Guignedoux 74', 83'; Prost 80'	Report	Félix 24'	Stadium: Stade Bauer; Attendance: 12,456; Referee: Pierre Coquerille

2 October 1971 9	Nîmes	4–1	Paris Saint-Germain	Nîmes
	Vergnes 19', 55' (pen.), 87'; Voinea 53'	Report	Djorkaeff 23' (pen.)	Stadium: Stade Jean-Bouin; Attendance: 8,547; Referee: Georges Uhlen

13 October 1971 10	Paris Saint-Germain	4–1	Red Star	Colombes
	Prost 6', 78'; Bras 12', 57'	Report	González 20'	Stadium: Stade Yves-du-Manoir; Attendance: 8,305; Referee: Robert Wurtz

16 October 1971 11	Angoulême	3–1	Paris Saint-Germain	Angoulême
	Castellan 7' (pen.), 51' (pen.); Madronnet 44'	Report	Hallet 24'	Stadium: Stade Lebon; Attendance: 4,001; Referee: Roger Mouton

23 October 1971 12	Paris Saint-Germain	2–4	Reims	Saint-Ouen-sur-Seine
	Prost 69', 85'	Report	Lech 29', 52'; Richard 42'; Onnis 63'	Stadium: Stade Bauer; Attendance: 13,133; Referee: Roger Machin

31 October 1971 13	Metz	2–0	Paris Saint-Germain	Metz
	Atamaniuk 63'; Bourgeois 77'	Report		Stadium: Stade Saint-Symphorien; Attendance: 7,970; Referee: Raymond Poncin

13 November 1971 14	Paris Saint-Germain	1–0	Sochaux	Saint-Ouen-sur-Seine
	Béréau 40'	Report		Stadium: Stade Bauer; Attendance: 10,178; Referee: Robert Héliès

17 November 1971 15	Paris Saint-Germain	1–2	Lyon	Saint-Ouen-sur-Seine
	Hallet 44'	Report	Ravier 63'; Trivić 72' (pen.)	Stadium: Stade Bauer; Attendance: 6,613; Referee: Stéphane Frère

21 November 1971 16	Monaco	2–1	Paris Saint-Germain	Monaco
	Belghilt 29'; Dalger 84'	Report	Hallet 12'	Stadium: Stade Louis II; Attendance: 1,802; Referee: Georges Uhlen

28 November 1971 17	Paris Saint-Germain	1–1	Ajaccio	Saint-Ouen-sur-Seine
	Leonetti 39'	Report	Serra 46'	Stadium: Stade Bauer; Attendance: 6,216; Referee: Louis Dhumerelle

12 December 1971 18	Marseille	4–2	Paris Saint-Germain	Marseille
	Bosquier 12'; Skoblar 18', 83'; Couécou 49'	Report	Prost 44', 73'	Stadium: Stade Vélodrome; Attendance: 18,798; Referee: Bernard Amiotte

19 December 1971 19	Paris Saint-Germain	1–1	Rennes	Colombes
	Hallet 31'	Report	Lenoir 60'	Stadium: Stade Yves-du-Manoir; Attendance: 15,590; Referee: René Vigliani

9 January 1972 20	Bordeaux	2–0	Paris Saint-Germain	Bordeaux
	Ruiter 59'; Petyt 68'	Report		Stadium: Stade Chaban-Delmas; Attendance: 5,425; Referee: Robert Héliès

16 January 1972 21	Paris Saint-Germain	1–4	Nancy	Saint-Ouen-sur-Seine
	Bras 17'	Report	Kuszowski 29', 56', 70'; Castronovo 44'	Stadium: Stade Bauer; Attendance: 9,911; Referee: René Vigliani

30 January 1972 22	Lille	1–3	Paris Saint-Germain	Lille
	Copé 3'	Report	Bras 33', 85'; Leonetti 55'	Stadium: Stade Henri-Jooris; Attendance: 11,320; Referee: René Lefebvre

6 February 1972 23	Paris Saint-Germain	2–3	Nantes	Saint-Ouen-sur-Seine
	Leonetti 14'; Arribas 36'	Report	Maas 39'; Marcos 53', 65'	Stadium: Stade Bauer; Attendance: 12,301; Referee: Bernard Amiotte

12 February 1972 24	Nice	1–1	Paris Saint-Germain	Nice
	Revelli 78'	Report	Bras 50'	Stadium: Stade du Ray; Attendance: 7,899; Referee: Roger Machin

27 February 1972 25	Paris Saint-Germain	1–3	Saint-Étienne	Saint-Ouen-sur-Seine
	Hallet 39'	Report	Revelli 38', 68'; Parizon 72'	Stadium: Stade Bauer; Attendance: 10,874; Referee: Achille Verbecke

5 March 1972 26	Bastia	1–0	Paris Saint-Germain	Furiani
	Dogliani 1'	Report		Stadium: Stade Armand-Cesari; Attendance: 3,069; Referee: André Petit

18 March 1972 27	Paris Saint-Germain	1–1	Nîmes	Saint-Ouen-sur-Seine
	Guignedoux 80'	Report	Vergnes 29'	Stadium: Stade Bauer; Attendance: 11,097; Referee: Robert Wurtz

26 March 1972 28	Red Star	0–0	Paris Saint-Germain	Saint-Ouen-sur-Seine
		Report		Stadium: Stade Bauer; Attendance: 10,278; Referee: Georges Uhlen

29 March 1972 29	Paris Saint-Germain	3–0	Angoulême	Saint-Ouen-sur-Seine
	Arribas 27'; Guignedoux 75'; Rémond 83'	Report		Stadium: Stade Bauer; Attendance: 4,507; Referee: René Lefebvre

1 April 1972 30	Reims	3–3	Paris Saint-Germain	Reims
	Onnis 23', 29', 33' (pen.)	Report	Prost 18'; Rémond 22'; Guignedoux 73'	Stadium: Stade Auguste-Delaune; Attendance: 6,389; Referee: Stéphane Frère

12 April 1972 31	Paris Saint-Germain	3–1	Metz	Saint-Ouen-sur-Seine
	Prost 11', 43'; Rémond 12'	Report	Combin 19'	Stadium: Stade Bauer; Attendance: 6,722; Referee: Robert Héliès

22 April 1972 32	Sochaux	0–2	Paris Saint-Germain	Montbéliard
		Report	Hallet 63'; Djorkaeff 73'	Stadium: Stade Auguste-Bonal; Attendance: 6,727; Referee: Roger Machin

28 April 1972 33	Lyon	3–1	Paris Saint-Germain	Lyon
	Lacombe 14', 65'; Di Nallo 15'	Report	Hallet 40'	Stadium: Stade de Gerland; Attendance: 9,529; Referee: Achille Verbecke

3 May 1972 34	Paris Saint-Germain	0–0	Monaco	Saint-Ouen-sur-Seine
		Report		Stadium: Stade Bauer; Attendance: 6,340; Referee: Robert Wurtz

6 May 1972 35	Ajaccio	3–0	Paris Saint-Germain	Ajaccio
	M'Pelé 12', 29'; Dortomb 23'	Report		Stadium: Stade François Coty; Attendance: 1,630; Referee: Raymond Poncin

17 May 1972 36	Paris Saint-Germain	1–2	Marseille	Colombes
	Bras 60'	Report	Kula 2'; Novi 23'	Stadium: Stade Yves-du-Manoir; Attendance: 14,140; Referee: Pierre Coquerille

20 May 1972 37	Rennes	1–1	Paris Saint-Germain	Rennes
	Guermeur 58'	Report	Rémond 49'	Stadium: Roazhon Park; Attendance: 7,935; Referee: Jean-Pierre Peauger

27 May 1972 38	Paris Saint-Germain	0–1	Angers	Saint-Ouen-sur-Seine
		Report	Edwige 84'	Stadium: Stade Bauer; Attendance: 6,131; Referee: Michel Vautrot

=== Coupe de France ===
==== Round of 64 ====
23 January 1972 Single leg	Valenciennes	1–0	Paris Saint-Germain	Reims
	Yegba Maya 68'	Report		Stadium: Stade Auguste-Delaune; Attendance: 2,343; Referee: André Petit

== Statistics ==
=== Appearances and goals ===
21 players featured in at least one official match, and the club scored 51 goals in official competitions.

Rank	Player	Position	Appearances	Goals	Source
1	(France) Michel Prost	FW	39	12	
2	(France) Bernard Guignedoux	MF	39	6	
3	(France) Jean Djorkaeff	DF	39	2	
4	(France) Jean-Louis Leonetti	MF	37	3	
5	(France) Roland Mitoraj	DF	36	0	
6	(France) Gérard Hallet	MF	34	8	
7	(France) Claude Arribas	DF	34	2	
8	(France) Jean-Paul Rostagni	DF	32	0	
9	(France) Guy Delhumeau	GK	31	0	
10	(France) Jean-Claude Bras	FW	28	12	
11	(France) Daniel Solas	DF	27	0	
12	(France) Sylvain Léandri	DF	15	0	
13	(France) Jacques Rémond	FW	12	4	
14	(France) Jean-Louis Brost	FW	12	0	
15	(France) Bernard Béréau	DF	10	2	
16	(France) Camille Choquier	GK	8	0	
17	(France) Daniel Horlaville	FW	7	0	
18	(France) Jean-Pierre Destrumelle	MF	4	0	
19	(France) Daniel Guicci	DF	4	0	
20	(England) Jantzen Derrick	FW	3	0	
21	(Brazil) Joel Camargo	DF	2	0	
