= 1970–71 Paris Saint-Germain FC season =

1st season of Paris Saint-Germain FC

Paris Saint-Germain
1970–71 season
- President: Pierre-Étienne Guyot
- Manager: Pierre Phelipon
- Stadium: Stade Jean-Bouin; Stade Georges Lefèvre
- Ligue 2: 1st (promoted)
- Coupe de France: Round of 64
- Top goalscorer: League: Jacques Rémond (10); Michel Prost (10); All: Jacques Rémond (11)
- Average home league attendance: 3,018
Home colours	Away colours

The 1970–71 season was the 1st season in the history of Paris Saint-Germain FC. PSG played the majority of their home league matches at the Stade Jean-Bouin, while occasionally hosting fixtures at the Stade Georges Lefèvre, attracting an average of 3,018 spectators per match. The club's president was Pierre-Étienne Guyot, and the team was managed by player-coach Pierre Phelipon, with Jean Djorkaeff serving as captain. PSG won the Ligue 2 title, achieving promotion to Ligue 1, and reached the round of 64 in the Coupe de France. Jacques Rémond was the team's top scorer, netting 11 goals in all competitions, including 10 in the league, while Michel Prost also contributed 10 league goals.

== Players ==
=== Squad ===
Players who featured in at least one official match for the club.

Note: Flags indicate national team as defined under FIFA eligibility rules; some limited exceptions apply. Players may hold more than one non-FIFA nationality.

No.	Pos.	Nation	Player
—	GK	FRA	Camille Choquier
—	GK	FRA	Patrice Py
—	DF	FRA	Daniel Guicci
—	DF	FRA	Jean-Claude Fitte-Duval
—	DF	FRA	Jean Djorkaeff (captain)
—	DF	FRA	Bernard Béréau
—	DF	FRA	Pierre Phelipon (player-coach)
—	DF	POR	Fernando Cruz
—	DF	FRA	Roland Mitoraj
—	MF	FRA	Jean-Pierre Destrumelle

No.	Pos.	Nation	Player
—	MF	FRA	Bernard Guignedoux
—	MF	YUG	Živko Lukić
—	MF	FRA	Alain Garillière
—	FW	FRA	Jacques Rémond
—	FW	FRA	Thierry Carré
—	FW	FRA	Dominique Delplanque
—	FW	FRA	Jean-Claude Bras
—	FW	FRA	Michel Prost
—	FW	FRA	Jean-Louis Brost

== Transfers ==
=== Arrivals ===
Players who signed for the club.

Note: Flags indicate national team as defined under FIFA eligibility rules; some limited exceptions apply. Players may hold more than one non-FIFA nationality.

No.	Pos.	Nation	Player
—	GK	FRA	Camille Choquier (from Stade Saint-Germain)
—	GK	FRA	Patrice Py (from Olympique Alès)
—	DF	FRA	Bernard Béréau (from Stade Saint-Germain)
—	DF	FRA	Roland Mitoraj (from Saint-Étienne)
—	DF	FRA	Jean Djorkaeff (from Marseille)
—	DF	POR	Fernando Cruz (from Benfica)
—	DF	FRA	Jean-Claude Fitte-Duval (from Stade Saint-Germain)
—	DF	FRA	Daniel Guicci (from Valenciennes)
—	DF	FRA	Pierre Phelipon (from Stade Saint-Germain)
—	DF	FRA	Michel Béhier (from Stade Saint-Germain)

No.	Pos.	Nation	Player
—	MF	FRA	Bernard Guignedoux (from Stade Saint-Germain)
—	MF	FRA	Jean-Pierre Destrumelle (from Marseille)
—	MF	YUG	Živko Lukić (Free agent)
—	MF	FRA	Alain Garillière (from Stade Saint-Germain)
—	FW	FRA	Michel Prost (from Stade Saint-Germain)
—	FW	FRA	Jean-Claude Bras (from RFC Liège)
—	FW	FRA	Jean-Louis Brost (from Stade Saint-Germain)
—	FW	FRA	Jacques Rémond (from Cannes)
—	FW	FRA	Thierry Carré (from Stade Saint-Germain)
—	FW	FRA	Dominique Delplanque (from Stade Saint-Germain)

== Kits ==
The club had no shirt sponsor, and Le Coq Sportif was the kit supplier.

Home	Away

== Competitions ==
=== Overview ===
Competition	First match	Last match	Starting round	Final position	Record							
Competition	First match	Last match	Starting round	Final position	Pld	W	D	L	GF	GA	GD	Win %
Ligue 2	23 August 1970	12 June 1971	Matchday 1	Winners	32	18	12	2	58	27	+31	56.25
Coupe de France	22 November 1970	7 February 1971	Fifth round	Round of 64	3	2	0	1	3	2	+1	66.67
Total					35	20	12	3	61	29	+32	57.14

Source: Competitions

=== Ligue 2 ===
==== Regular season (Group Center) ====
Pos	Team	Pld	W	D	L	GF	GA	GD	Pts	Promotion or relegation
1	Paris Saint-Germain (P, Q)	30	17	11	2	52	23	+29	45	1971–72 French Division 1 Championship play-offs
2	Rouen	30	16	9	5	53	25	+28	41	
3	Limoges	30	13	10	7	50	35	+15	36	
4	Montluçon	30	13	9	8	56	39	+17	35	
5	Brest	30	11	13	6	49	39	+10	35	

Source: Histoire du PSG
Rules for classification: 1) points; 2) goal difference; 3) number of goals scored.
(P) Promoted; (Q) Qualified for the phase indicated

==== Results by round ====
Round	1	2	3	4	5	6	7	8	9	10	11	12	13	14	15	16	17	18	19	20	21	22	23	24	25	26	27	28	29	30
Ground	A	H	A	H	A	H	A	A	H	A	H	A	H	A	H	A	H	A	H	A	H	H	A	H	A	H	A	H	A	H
Result	D	W	D	W	D	W	D	D	L	W	W	W	W	W	D	D	W	W	W	D	W	D	W	W	L	W	D	D	W	W
Position	7	5	6	4	5	1	4	3	6	5	2	2	1	1	1	1	2	1	1	1	1	1	1	1	1	1	1	1	1	1

Source: Histoire du PSG
A = Away; H = Home; W = Win; D = Draw; L = Loss

==== Championship play-offs ====
Pos	Team	Pld	W	D	L	GF	GA	GD	Pts
1	Paris Saint-Germain (C)	2	1	1	0	6	4	+2	3
2	Monaco	2	0	2	0	4	4	0	2
3	Lille	2	0	1	1	4	6	−2	1

Source: Histoire du PSG
Rules for classification: 1) points; 2) goal difference; 3) number of goals scored.
(C) Champions

==== Matches ====
23 August 1970 1	Poitiers	1–1	Paris Saint-Germain	Poitiers
	Pédini 30'	Report	Guignedoux 69'	Stadium: Stade Paul-Rébeilleau; Attendance: 4,022; Referee: Émile Maillereau

29 August 1970 2	Paris Saint-Germain	3–2	Quevilly	Paris
	Djorkaeff 18' (pen.); Prost 65'; Béréau 81'	Report	Parmentier 3'; Horlaville 47'	Stadium: Stade Jean-Bouin; Attendance: 3,792; Referee: Jean Maillard

13 September 1970 3	Le Havre	2–2	Paris Saint-Germain	Le Havre
	Bazaud 72'; Yvinec 81'	Report	Bras 18'; Djorkaeff 75' (pen.)	Stadium: Stade de la Cavée Verte; Attendance: 3,651; Referee: Achille Verbecke

20 September 1970 4	Paris Saint-Germain	2–0	Caen	Saint-Germain-en-Laye
	Prost 8', 84'	Report		Stadium: Stade Georges Lefèvre; Attendance: 2,197; Referee: Léon Plaete

26 September 1970 5	Lorient	0–0	Paris Saint-Germain	Lorient
		Report		Stadium: Stade du Moustoir; Attendance: 7,119; Referee: René Lefebvre

3 October 1970 6	Paris Saint-Germain	2–1	Brest	Paris
	Rémond 17'; Brost 24'	Report	Gnohité 59'	Stadium: Stade Jean-Bouin; Attendance: 3,903; Referee: Jean Zuszek

10 October 1970 7	Bourges	1–1	Paris Saint-Germain	Bourges
	Juliani 23'	Report	Plaza 81' (o.g.)	Stadium: Stade Séraucourt; Attendance: 5,875; Referee: André Jourdain

17 October 1970 8	Le Mans	0–0	Paris Saint-Germain	Le Mans
		Report		Stadium: Stade Léon-Bollée; Attendance: 5,863; Referee: Mr. Guesdon

25 October 1970 9	Paris Saint-Germain	0–2	Châteauroux	Saint-Germain-en-Laye
		Report	Hasson 22'; Rabaguino 75'	Stadium: Stade Georges Lefèvre; Attendance: 2,498; Referee: Mr. Beghien

31 October 1970 10	Blois	2–5	Paris Saint-Germain	Blois
	Collin 5'; Piat 69'	Report	Béréau 10', 65'; Bras 20'; Djorkaeff 87'; Rémond 88'	Stadium: Allées Jean Leroi Municipal Stadium; Attendance: 6,177; Referee: Louis Rives

7 November 1970 11	Paris Saint-Germain	3–0	Montluçon	Paris
	Prost 23'; Guignedoux 58'; Rémond 88'	Report		Stadium: Stade Jean-Bouin; Attendance: 3,671; Referee: Stéphane Frère

29 November 1970 12	Laval	1–2	Paris Saint-Germain	Laval
	Clair 42'	Report	Guignedoux 30'; Rémond 31'	Stadium: Stade Francis Le Basser; Attendance: 3,513; Referee: Marcel Bacou

6 December 1970 13	Paris Saint-Germain	5–0	Quimper	Paris
	Brost 24', 69'; Prost 48'; Bras 65'; Djorkaeff 89' (pen.)	Report		Stadium: Stade Jean-Bouin; Attendance: 3,081; Referee: Louis Dhumerelle

20 December 1970 14	Limoges	0–1	Paris Saint-Germain	Limoges
		Report	Guignedoux 11'	Stadium: Stade Saint-Lazare; Attendance: 7,416; Referee: Georges Uhlen

26 December 1970 15	Paris Saint-Germain	1–1	Rouen	Paris
	Djorkaeff 82' (pen.)	Report	Pospíchal 83'	Stadium: Stade Jean-Bouin; Attendance: 6,304; Referee: Jean-Claude Martin

17 January 1971 17	Paris Saint-Germain	1–0	Le Havre	Saint-Germain-en-Laye
	Bras 23'	Report		Stadium: Stade Georges Lefèvre; Attendance: 1,972; Referee: Albert Lempereur

24 January 1971 18	Caen	1–2	Paris Saint-Germain	Caen
	Lecanu 83'	Report	Bras 8'; Prost 34'	Stadium: Stade de Venoix; Attendance: 3,010; Referee: Marcel Bacou

31 January 1971 19	Paris Saint-Germain	2–1	Lorient	Paris
	Rémond 56'; Guignedoux 68'	Report	Fuentes 89'	Stadium: Stade Jean-Bouin; Attendance: 2,588; Referee: René Lefebvre

21 February 1971 21	Paris Saint-Germain	4–0	Bourges	Paris
	Béréau 12'; Brost 23'; Rémond 65', 82'	Report		Stadium: Stade Jean-Bouin; Attendance: 2,082; Referee: Mr. Caudrelier

27 February 1971 16	Quevilly	0–0	Paris Saint-Germain	Le Petit-Quevilly
		Report		Stadium: Amable-et-Micheline-Lozai Stadium; Attendance: 12,193; Referee: Robert Wurtz

7 March 1971 22	Paris Saint-Germain	1–1	Le Mans	Paris
	Prost 69'	Report	Marchi 21'	Stadium: Stade Jean-Bouin; Attendance: 1,762; Referee: Stéphane Frère

14 March 1971 23	Châteauroux	1–2	Paris Saint-Germain	Châteauroux
	Strappe 82'	Report	Guignedoux 6', 35'	Stadium: Stade Gaston Petit; Attendance: 4,590; Referee: Robert Frauciel

20 March 1971 24	Paris Saint-Germain	1–0	Blois	Paris
	Béréau 85'	Report		Stadium: Stade Jean-Bouin; Attendance: 3,220; Referee: Roger Machin

27 March 1971 20	Brest	1–1	Paris Saint-Germain	Brest
	Delorme 46'	Report	Béréau 5'	Stadium: Stade Francis-Le Blé; Attendance: 10,212; Referee: Raymond Poncin

4 April 1971 25	Montluçon	2–1	Paris Saint-Germain	Montluçon
	Konan 15'; Périgaud 61'	Report	Brost 64'	Stadium: Stade Dunlop; Attendance: 5,414; Referee: Gaston Eyroulet

17 April 1971 26	Paris Saint-Germain	1–0	Laval	Paris
	Prost 29'	Report		Stadium: Stade Jean-Bouin; Attendance: 2,448; Referee: Louis Dhumerelle

8 May 1971 28	Paris Saint-Germain	0–0	Limoges	Paris
		Report		Stadium: Stade Jean-Bouin; Attendance: 3,588; Referee: Raymond Poncin

15 May 1971 29	Rouen	1–3	Paris Saint-Germain	Le Petit-Quevilly
	Notheaux 36'	Report	Prost 33'; Bras 61'; Béréau 74'	Stadium: Stade Robert Diochon; Attendance: 14,963; Referee: Robert Wurtz

22 May 1971 27	Quimper	1–1	Paris Saint-Germain	Quimper
	Pohon 80'	Report	Bras 90'	Stadium: Stade de Penvillers; Attendance: 8,450; Referee: Marcel Bacou

30 May 1971 30	Paris Saint-Germain	4–1	Poitiers	Saint-Germain-en-Laye
	Bras 22'; Rémond 49', 81'; Delplanque 63'	Report	Pédini 54'	Stadium: Stade Georges Lefèvre; Attendance: 2,274; Referee: Achille Verbecke

6 June 1971 Championship play-offs	Monaco	2–2	Paris Saint-Germain	Monaco
	Floch 9'; Dell'Oste 24'	Report	Piana 13' (o.g.); Bras 54'	Stadium: Stade Louis II; Attendance: 1,905; Referee: Gaston Eyroulet

12 June 1971 Championship play-offs	Paris Saint-Germain	4–2	Lille	Paris
	Béréau 1'; Rémond 20'; Guignedoux 68'; Prost 80'	Report	Bajić 52'; Dubaële 88'	Stadium: Stade Jean-Bouin; Attendance: 4,755; Referee: André Petit

=== Coupe de France ===
==== Preliminary rounds ====
22 November 1970 Fifth round	Dieppe	0–1	Paris Saint-Germain	Dieppe
		Report	Rémond 83'	Stadium: Stade Maurice-Thoumyre; Attendance: 2,375; Referee: Raymond Poncin

13 December 1970 Sixth round	Paris Saint-Germain	1–0	Étaples	Saint-Germain-en-Laye
	Guignedoux 47'	Report		Stadium: Stade Georges Lefèvre; Attendance: 1,999; Referee: Albert Lempereur

==== Round of 64 ====
7 February 1971 Single leg	Louhans-Cuiseaux	2–1	Paris Saint-Germain	Dijon
	Girardot 30', 88'	Report	Destrumelle 57'	Stadium: Stade Gaston Gérard; Attendance: 4,000; Referee: Bernard Amiotte

== Statistics ==
=== Appearances and goals ===
19 players featured in at least one official match, and the club scored 61 goals in official competitions, including two own goals.

Rank	Player	Position	Appearances	Goals	Source
1	(France) Michel Prost	FW	35	10	
2	(France) Bernard Guignedoux	MF	35	9	
3	(France) Bernard Béréau	DF	34	8	
4	(France) Roland Mitoraj	DF	33	0	
5	(France) Jean-Claude Bras	FW	32	9	
6	(France) Camille Choquier	GK	31	0	
7	(France) Jean-Louis Brost	FW	30	5	
8	(France) Jean-Pierre Destrumelle	MF	30	1	
9	(France) Jacques Rémond	FW	29	11	
10	(France) Jean Djorkaeff	DF	29	5	
11	(Portugal) Fernando Cruz	DF	27	0	
12	(France) Jean-Claude Fitte-Duval	DF	25	0	
13	(France) Daniel Guicci	DF	21	0	
14	(France) Thierry Carré	FW	7	0	
15	(France) Pierre Phelipon	DF	4	0	
16	(France) Patrice Py	GK	4	0	
17	(France) Dominique Delplanque	FW	2	1	
18	(Socialist Federal Republic of Yugoslavia) Živko Lukić	MF	1	0	
19	(France) Alain Garillière	MF	1	0	
