= History of Paris FC =

History of Paris Football Club

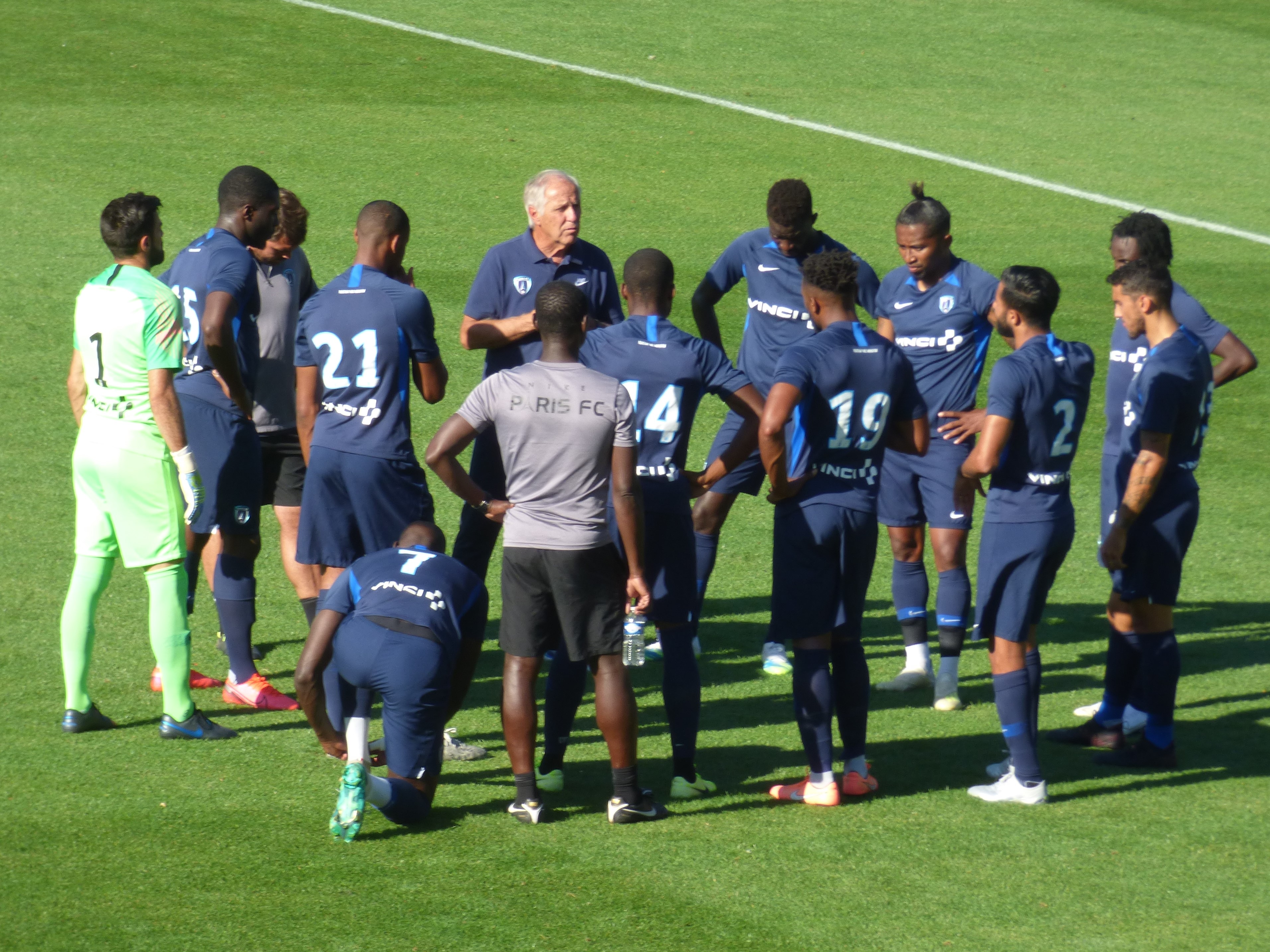
Paris FC squad in the 2015–16 season.

Paris Football Club was founded in 1969 as part of an ambitious plan by the French Football Federation to re-establish elite football in the capital. A year later, it merged with Stade Saint-Germain to form Paris Saint-Germain, only to split again in 1972 following disagreements with the Paris City Council over the club's identity. Paris FC retained the professional status and place in Division 1, while PSG were relegated to Division 3. However, the two clubs' fortunes quickly diverged—PSG rose to prominence, while Paris FC began a long struggle for stability.

The newly independent Paris FC suffered early setbacks, including relegation and the loss of their home stadium, the Parc des Princes, to PSG. A brief return to Ligue 1 in 1978–79 was short-lived, and despite occasional ambitious projects—such as the failed merger with Racing Club de France in the early 1980s—the club descended into the lower divisions, even falling as far as the fifth tier by the mid-1980s. A series of rebrandings followed throughout the 1990s, but the club remained largely in the amateur and semi-professional ranks. Paris FC regained stability in the 2000s, returning to Ligue 2 in 2015. A major turning point came in 2024 when the Arnault family acquired a majority stake in the club, providing significant investment. The momentum culminated in Paris FC's return to Ligue 1 in 2025, after a 46-year absence.

== Foundation and split (1969–1972) ==
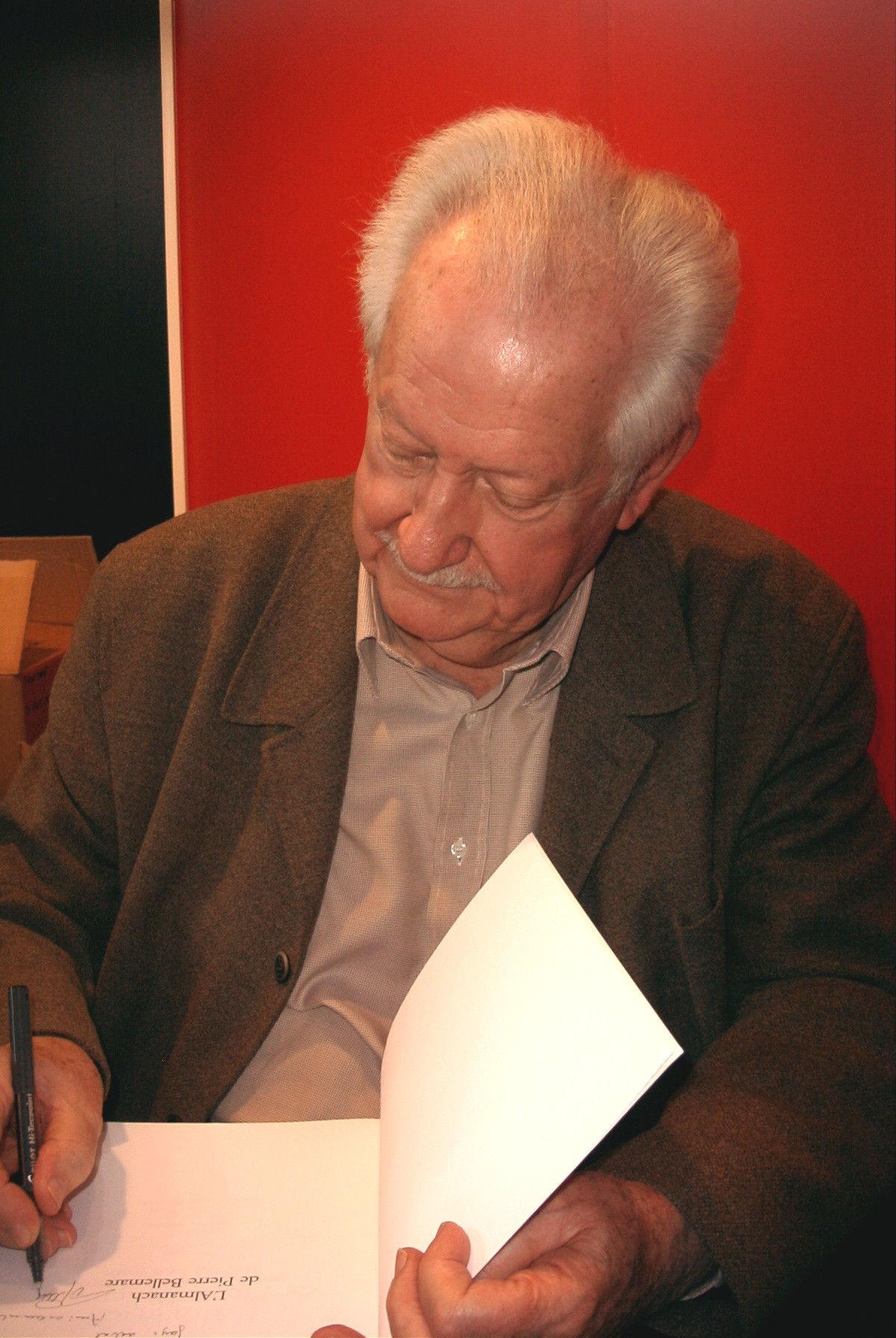
Pierre Bellemare, who appealed for the creation of an elite football team in Paris.

In January 1969, the French Football Federation (FFF) launched a project to create a major club in Paris, since the French capital did not have an elite football team, by establishing a dedicated committee led by Fernand Sastre, Henri Patrelle, and Guy Crescent. The following month, the FFF launched a public campaign, distributing ballots via the press and in Paris-region stadiums with the slogan: "Yes to a great football club in Paris". Citizens were invited to suggest names and return the forms. Over 60,000 responses were received, and the name "Paris Football Club" (or "Football-Club de Paris") emerged as the most popular. On 5 July, the first general assembly of Paris FC was held, although the club remained a "virtual" entity, lacking a team or a stadium during the 1969–70 season, two presidents were named: Guy Crescent and Pierre-Étienne Guyot, a former vice-president of Racing Club de France. The two alongside Henri Patrelle were stuck with a problem related to the financing of the project until they met Real Madrid president Santiago Bernabéu. The latter told them that starting a subscription campaign was the best solution.

Seeking entry to Division 1, Paris FC approached CS Sedan Ardennes for a merger, but Sedan — already wary from a past failed merger with Racing — refused. With the FFF under pressure to revive elite football in Paris, they went looking in the second division and, subsequently, merged with Stade Saint-Germain to form Paris Saint-Germain. For the first time in French football history, the fans had financially contributed to the creation of a football club.

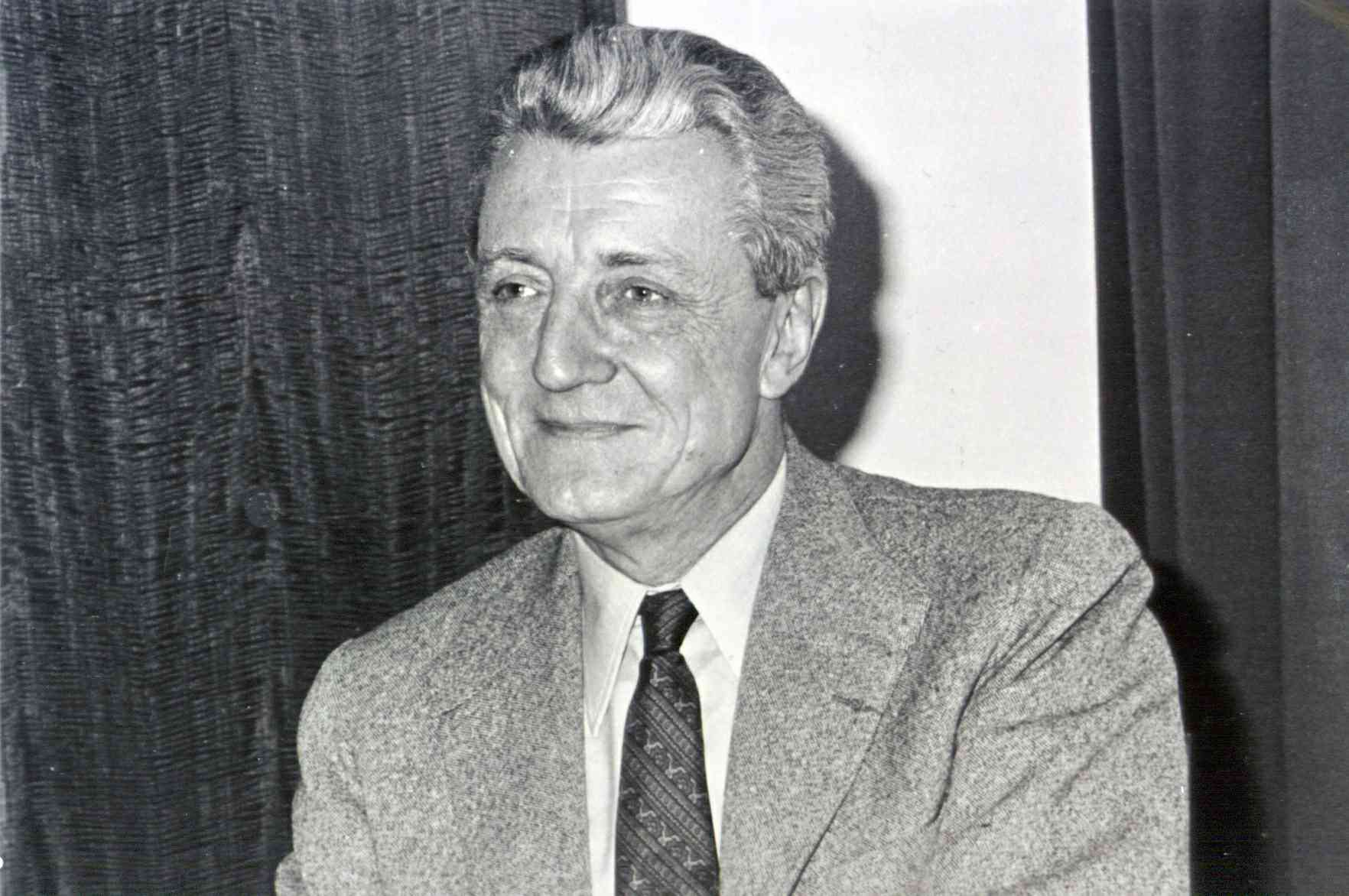
Guy Crescent, one of PFC's founding fathers.

Paris FC contributed with the financial backing, while Stade Saint-Germain provided the sporting infrastructure, from the Division 2 status to the Camp des Loges training center, as well as the manager Pierre Phelipon and most of the players, including Bernard Guignedoux, Michel Prost and Camille Choquier. Soon after, the club entered a delicate financial situation, acumulating a reported 205k francs in losses for the season. In September 1971, the Paris City Council offered 850k francs to pay the club's debt and save its place in the elite, demanding PSG in return to adopt the more Parisian name "Paris Football Club", after the council refused to support a non-Parisian club (the club had originally been situated in nearby Saint-Germain-en-Laye). Guy Crescent, who had replaced Pierre-Étienne Guyot as club president before the start of the season, was in favor of the name change, but Henri Patrelle was against it. The disagreement led to Crescent's resignation in December 1971, handing the presidency to Patrelle. The latter tried to persuade the council to reconsider their position, but they remained inflexible and the club split on June 1, 1972, a few days after the last match of the campaign. Both remained as separate football club with the main agreement being that Paris FC had the right to keep the splitting entity's first division and professional status, as well as all the professional players. Paris Saint-Germain were, on the other hand, administratively relegated to the Division 3 and given all the former entity's amateur players, thus losing professional status.

== Struggles and rebrandings (1972–2007) ==
At the beginning of the 1972–73 season, Paris were playing in the first division hosting matches at the Parc des Princes. Bound by professional contracts with Paris FC, most of the club's players, including team captain Jean Djorkaeff and Bernard Guignedoux, continued playing in Division 1. Two seasons later, the club was relegated to the second division, which coincided with Paris Saint-Germain's rise to top-flight and taking the Parc des Princes with them.

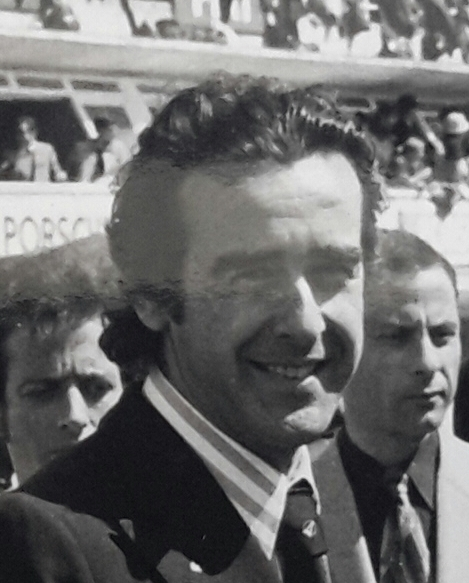
Jean-Luc Lagardère, one of PFC's owners.

Exiled to the outdated Stade de la Porte de Montreuil, having lost its professional status and top players, the first team — then coached by Antoine Dalla Cieca — was largely composed of players from the former CA Montreuil, who had played in the Division d'Honneur, as well as their reserve team from the Promotion d'Honneur. The early days were difficult, particularly after a fire destroyed the stadium, forcing the club to find alternative grounds for over a year. The club narrowly avoided relegation, then spent two mid-table seasons in Division 2, struggling to attract fans torn between nostalgia for old major clubs and a rising fanbase for PSG, which was firmly establishing itself in Division 1.

In 1976, the club regained professional status and after an uneventful season, the recruitment of several renowned players sparked hope for a revival. After four years of playing in Division 2, Paris FC returned to the first division for the 1978–79 season. With a limited squad and no defined playing style, Paris FC soon found itself in last place of the league. In October, Europe 1 and the Paris City Council attempted to rescue the club. The media group funded reinforcements in exchange for a short-lived name change to "Paris 1". The season was a difficult one and the club suffered a crushing 7–1 defeat at home to Monaco. Eventually, they finished at 19th place, resulted in the club falling back to Division 2 after one season, after losing the relegation play-offs to Lens. However, during that season, the club set its attendance record on 27 April 1979, with 41,025 spectators for a league match against Saint-Étienne.

Chronology of names, mergers and splits

Paris Football Club; 1969–1970	Stade Saint-Germain; 1904–1970
CA Montreuil; 1920–1972	Paris Saint-Germain; 1970–1972
Paris Football Club; 1972–1983	Paris Saint-Germain; 1972–
Racing Paris 1; 1982–1983	Racing Club Paris; 1896–1983
Paris Football Club; 83; 1983–1991	Racing Paris 1 / Matra Racing; 1983–1989
Paris Football Club; 98; 1991–1996
Paris Football Club; 2000; 1996–2005
Paris Football Club; 2005–

After barely surviving relegation over the following seasons, the club was heavily in debt, and the FFF considered relegating them to the third tier. At the same time, industrialist Jean-Luc Lagardère aimed to create a top-tier club in the Paris region capable of competing nationally and in Europe. To that end, Lagardère envisioned merging the Racing Club de France with Paris FC, which played in Division 2. Initially concerned about Paris FC's financial health, Racing’s officials declined the proposal. Unable to immediately realize his project, Lagardère bought Paris FC, promising that if the club stayed in Division 2, Racing would agree to merge. Subsequently, he anticipated the merger by renaming the club "Racing Paris 1" and adopting Racing’s sky blue and white colors. After surviving relegation, in the summer of 1983, the first team merged with Racing's, who remained in the first division. The remaining entity that was PFC was administratively relegated to the fourth division, being rebranded as "Paris Football Club 83". Due to having limited resources, Paris fell to the Division d'Honneur after one season and, subsequently, spent four seasons in the fifth division, before achieving consecutive promotions to Division 3 in 1988.

The following season, PFC made its debut in the Division 3, where they managed to stay up. At that point, an ambitious businessman, Bernard Caïazzo, became interested in the club, aiming for a rapid promotion to the second division in order to establish Paris FC as the capital's second club behind Paris Saint-Germain. In the 1989–1990 season, PFC finished twelfth out of sixteen in the East group. In 1991, the club renamed itself to "Paris Football Club 98", inspired by France's bid to host the 1998 FIFA World Cup, this was followed by PFC narrowly missing promotion in 1992. In 1996, the club was renamed "Paris Football Club 2000", and remained in Division 3 for 12 years becoming inaugural members of the Championnat National in the process. In 2000, the club finished 17th and were relegated to the Championnat de France amateur. In 2005, the club returned to its original name: "Paris Football Club". Under Jean-Marc Pilorget, appointed in 2004, the Parisian club rejoined the Championnat National six years after leaving it. Promotion was secured thanks to finishing first in Group D of the CFA in the 2005–06 season. In 2007, the club moved to the Stade Sébastien Charléty in the 13th arrondissement of Paris.

== Stabilization and Bahrain investment (2009–2024) ==
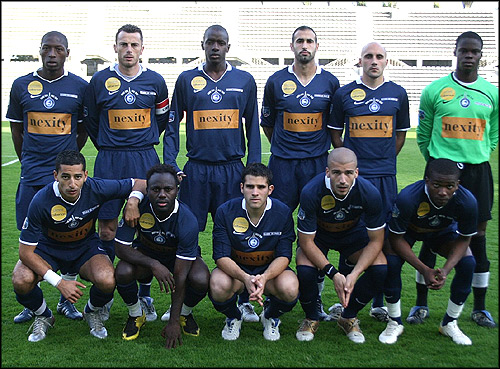
Paris FC squad in the 2009–10 season.

Following its return to the third tier of French football, Paris FC immediately set a goal of promotion to Ligue 2 by 2009. However, the plan failed and over the following years the club remained in the third division, once miraculously surviving relegation to the CFA (now Championnat National 2) in 2013 due to the administrative relegation of CS Sedan Ardennes. After a successful 2014–15 campaign, the club gained promotion to Ligue 2, the French second division, alongside its local rival Red Star after a 32-year absence. The club's management showed ambition, setting a goal of reaching Ligue 1 within four years. Despite a promising start to the season with several draws, the club quickly struggled, breaking the record for most matches without a win, at 24 games, leading Paris FC to be relegated back to the Championnat National for the 2016–17 season. In the 2016–17 season, Paris FC made the playoff/relegation final against Orleans but lost over the two legged game on aggregate. Paris FC were then administratively promoted to Ligue 2 after Bastia were demoted to the third division for financial irregularities.

For the 2017–18 Ligue 2 season, Paris FC finished 8th in the table but at one stage occupied the promotion places. In the 2018–19 season, Paris finished 4th and contested the promotion play-offs quarter-final against Lens, but lost in a penalty shoot-out after a 1–1 draw.

In July 2020, a new strategic economic partner joined Paris FC to support the club's development and ambitions the Kingdom of Bahrain. The deal was completed with a capital investment to improve the finances of the club, giving Bahrain 20% of the equity. Pierre Ferracci, who owned the club under the Alpha Group (French: Groupe Alpha) remained the main shareholder with a contribution of 77%. In addition, the Kingdom of Bahrain became the main sponsor of the club. On 30 April 2021, Paris FC, along with Angers, were handed a transfer ban by FIFA for violation of regulations regarding relay transfers in August 2020. The ban was effective for the summer 2021 transfer window.

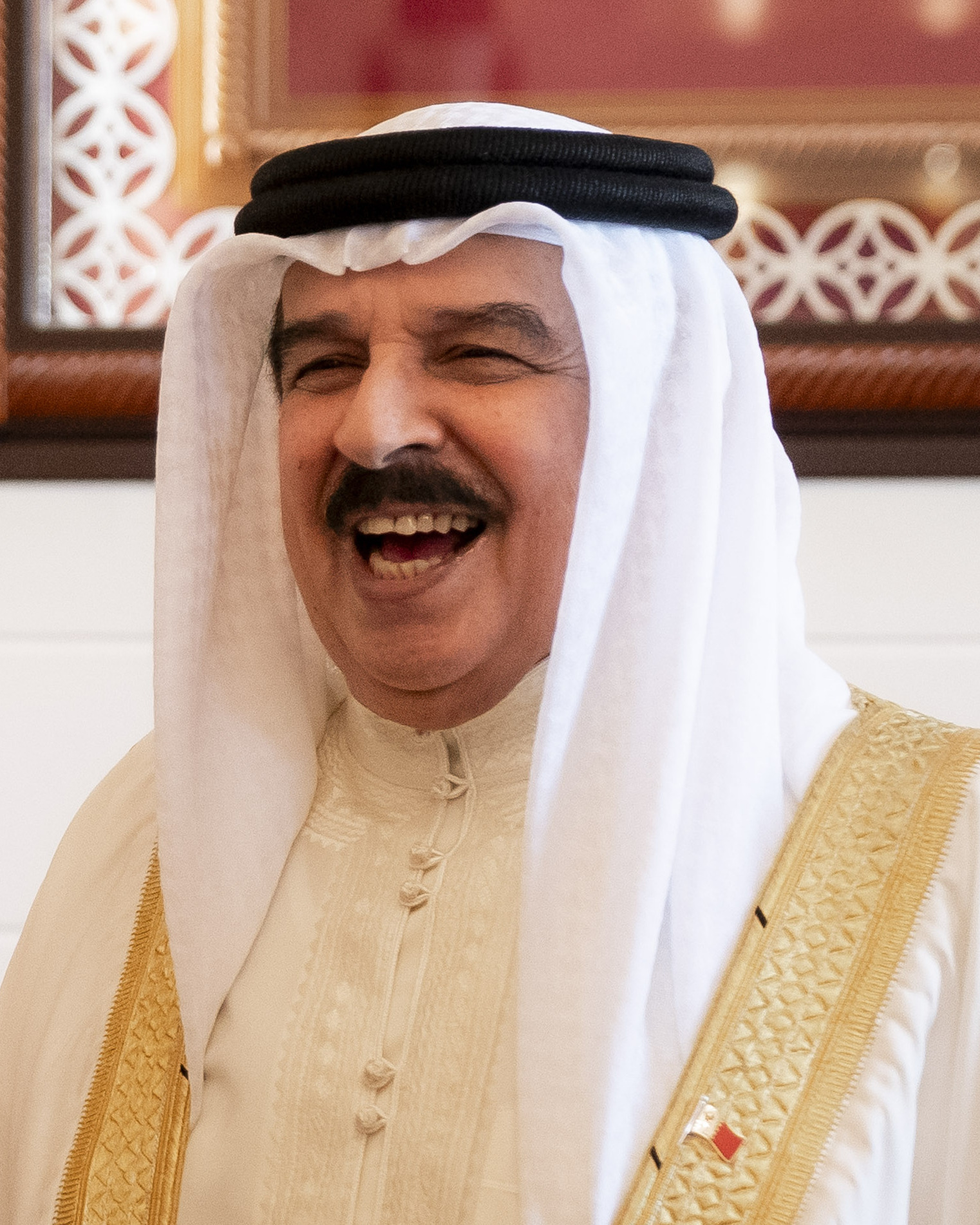
Hamad bin Isa Al Khalifa, King of Bahrain and stakeholder of the club.

The Council of Paris was to vote on renewing the yearly subvention that the City of Paris allocates to the Paris Club, several non-profit organizations based in Paris, including ADHRB called for the City of Paris to hold a dialogue on the abuse of human rights and death penalty practiced in the Kingdom of Bahrain, a 20% share holder of the club. The Council of Paris accused the kingdom of distracting the general public from its abuses via a popular sport like football, committing a practice known as ‘sportswashing’. The council also demanded the release of detainees put on death row by Bahrain on the basis of confessions acquired via torture methods. As one of the oldest partners of the Paris FC club, Mairie de Paris was called for pursuing its commitment towards the defense of human rights.

The NGOs had highlighted the human rights records and the sportswashing attempts of Bahrain, under which the club's jerseys promoted “Victorious Bahrain” and the grounds of the Stade Charléty had “Explore Bahrain” advertisements. Such publicity was considered inappropriate, as Bahrain was seen as a repressive regime. Following the appeal from the NGOs, the Council of Paris voted an amendment for the allocation of a subsidy of €500,000 to the club. In the amendment, all the issues were kept in mind to ensure the inclusion of an “organization of additional actions to raise awareness of human rights and fight against all forms of discrimination”. Besides, the mention of private financial partnerships in the amendment was believed to prompt a withdrawal of the “Explore Bahrain” advertising panels in the Charléty stadium.

== Arnault ownership and Ligue 1 return (2025–present) ==
In October 2024, it was reported that the Arnault family would purchase a majority ownership stake in Paris FC, along with a minority ownership by Red Bull GmbH. On 29 November 2024, the acquisition was made official, with the Arnault family buying a 52.4% stake through holding company Agache Sport. Pierre Ferracci retained a 29.8% stake through Alter Paris, while Red Bull GmbH acquired 10.6% and BRI Sports Holdings held a 7.2% stake in the club.

On 12 February 2025, Paris FC reached an agreement with rugby union club Stade Français for the team to move to their Stade Jean-Bouin, located in the 16th arrondissement, ahead of the 2025–26 season. Red Bull's Head of Global Soccer Jürgen Klopp pushed for Paris FC to change stadiums, due to Stade Charléty being primarily an athletics venue, which offered a poor atmosphere for football, with fans seated far from the pitch. He believed a strong matchday environment was essential for player performance and fan engagement. By relocating to Stade Jean-Bouin, a more suitable and enclosed stadium, Klopp aimed to align the club with Red Bull's football philosophy and support Paris FC’s ambitions to grow into a serious contender in French football. On 2 May 2025, Paris FC achieved promotion to Ligue 1, returning to the highest tier of French football after a 46-year absence.

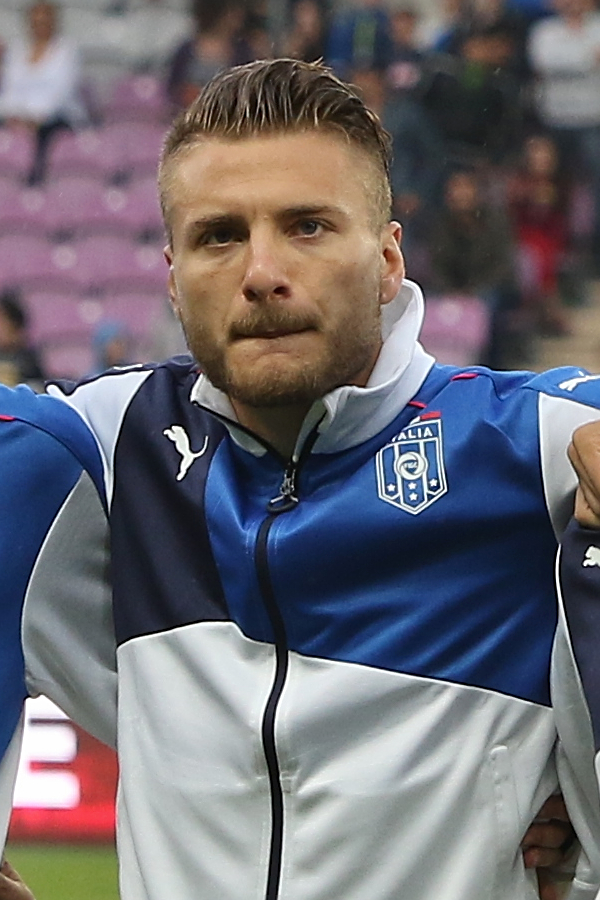
Former European Golden Shoe winner Ciro Immobile, who joined the club during their first top flight season back in Ligue 1

Paris FC's return to Ligue 1 in the 2025–26 season was built around a long-term strategy focused on developing younger players alongside experienced figures rather than immediately challenging for European places. The team struggled for consistency and Stéphane Gilli was replaced by Antoine Kombouaré in February as Paris FC sought to secure its top-flight status. In January, veteran Italian striker Ciro Immobile joined the club to provide additional experience and goals, although he scored only two Ligue 1 goals in twelve appearances. Paris FC ultimately recovered to finish 11th, comfortably avoiding relegation and ending their first Ligue 1 campaign since 1979 with a 2–1 victory over Paris Saint-Germain at the Stade Jean-Bouin. The two Parisian clubs had already met in the Coupe de France a week earlier, when Paris FC defeated PSG 1–0 at the Parc des Princes through a late goal from former PSG youth academy graduate Jonathan Ikoné, securing the club's first competitive victory over PSG and reaching the round of 16. Following discussions over his future, Kombouaré left the club by mutual agreement and was replaced by former Strasbourg and Chelsea head coach Liam Rosenior, with the goal of developing young players and to bring attacking style of football to the club.
