= Živko Lukić =

Serbian footballer (1943–2015)

Personal information
- Date of birth: 5 July 1943
- Place of birth: Belgrade, German-occupied Serbia
- Date of death: 2015 (aged 71–72)
- Place of death: Železnik, Belgrade, Serbia
- Height: 1.69 m (5 ft 7 in)
- Positions: Midfielder; defender

Youth career
- –1961: Napredak
- 1961–1963: Partizan
- 1963–1965: Rijeka

Senior career*
Years	Team	Apps	(Gls)
1965–1966	Maribor	0	(0)
1970–1971	Paris Saint-Germain	1	(0)
Total		1	(0)
- * Club domestic league appearances and goals

Živko Lukić (Serbian Cyrillic: Живко Лукић; 5 July 1943 – 2015) was a Serbian footballer who played as a midfielder and defender. He is known for being the first foreign player in Paris Saint-Germain history, making his way onto the team in a deceptive manner.

== Career ==
Lukić was a youth player for Partizan from 1961 to 1963. He made one appearance for the reserve team of the club on 6 June 1963, coming off the bench in a friendly against German club SV Merbeck. From 1963 to 1965, he played youth football for Rijeka; he was the captain of the club's team that won the 1964 Kvarnerska Rivijera without conceding a goal. In 1965, Lukić left for Maribor, where he would never play a first team match. By 1969, he was studying in Osijek to become a dentist.

In 1970, Paris Saint-Germain (PSG) was formed with the merging of Paris FC and Stade Saint-Germain; Lukić took advantage of the ambitious but disorganized project in Paris to hoax his way into the team. He tricked the entire PSG staff into believing that he had been an important player for Partizan in the past, and that he was the brother of Rennes player Ilija Lukić. Up to this point, Lukić's plan was succeeding; he even received a welcome from the well-known magazine France Football several days before his debut for PSG. On 14 August 1970, he played in a friendly for PSG against Red Star.

On 29 August 1970, Lukić played in his first and only official game with Paris Saint-Germain, coming on as a substitute in a 3–2 Division 2 win over Quevilly. In his 1992 autobiography, then-PSG president Guy Crescent wrote: "[Lukić's] mission was to neutralise our opponent's key player, [Daniel] Horlaville, whom we feared the most. And Lukić... he clung to him like an octopus to a rock! But Horlaville would quickly dribble past him once, then again, then make a pass, while my unfortunate Lukić would inevitably end up on his behind!"

Lukić only played a total of 53 minutes for PSG, and his deception was revealed after his appearance in a match. Despite his identity hoax, he was able to obtain a medal at the end of the season, as the Parisian club gained promotion to the Division 1 in 1971.

== Personal life and death ==
After his football days, Lukić lived the rest of his life running a dental clinic in Železnik. The clinic closed in 2012. He died in 2015.

Lukić is survived by his son Marko, who also became a dentist. According to Marko, his father is indeed related to Ilija Lukić, although they are not brothers as it was reported in France.

== Career statistics ==
Appearances and goals by club, season and competition
Club	Season	League			Cup		Total	
Club	Season	Division	Apps	Goals	Apps	Goals	Apps	Goals
Paris Saint-Germain	1970–71	Division 2	1	0	0	0	1	0
Career total			1	0	0	0	1	0

== Honours ==
Rijeka

- Kvarnerska Rivijera: 1964

Paris Saint-Germain

- Division 2: 1970–71
