= Daniel Guicci =

French footballer (1943-2016)

Personal information
- Full name: Daniel Hocine Guicci
- Date of birth: 27 December 1943
- Place of birth: Paris, France
- Date of death: 31 March 2016 (aged 72)
- Place of death: Le Mans, France
- Height: 1.74 m (5 ft 9 in)
- Position: Centre-back

Senior career*
Years	Team	Apps	(Gls)
1964–1970	Valenciennes	18	(0)
1970–1972	Paris Saint-Germain	23	(0)
1972–1974	Paris FC	5	(0)
Total		46	(0)

International career
- France Amateurs
- * Club domestic league appearances and goals

Daniel Hocine Guicci (or Guici; 27 December 1943 – 31 March 2016) was a French professional footballer who played as a centre-back.

== Club career ==
Guicci began his career at Valenciennes. He made 21 appearances for the club in all competitions before signing for newly-formed Paris Saint-Germain (PSG) in 1970.

On 24 January 1971, Guicci was involved in an altercation with Đuro Šorgić during a match between Caen and PSG. Marcel Bacou, the referee, handed a red card to Guicci; this was a first in the history of Paris Saint-Germain. Guicci left PSG in 1972 after having made a total of 25 appearances for the club. He joined the newly re-formed Paris FC, and ended his career there two years later.

== International career ==
Guicci was an amateur international for France.

== Career statistics ==
Appearances and goals by club, season and competition
Club	Season	League			Cup		Total	
Club	Season	Division	Apps	Goals	Apps	Goals	Apps	Goals
Valenciennes	1964–65	Division 1	0	0	1	0	1	0
Valenciennes	1965–66	Division 1	2	0	0	0	2	0
Valenciennes	1966–67	Division 1	0	0	0	0	0	0
Valenciennes	1967–68	Division 1	9	0	0	0	9	0
Valenciennes	1968–69	Division 1	4	0	0	0	4	0
Valenciennes	1969–70	Division 1	3	0	2	0	5	0
Valenciennes	Total		18	0	3	0	21	0
Paris Saint-Germain	1970–71	Division 2	19	0	2	0	21	0
Paris Saint-Germain	1971–72	Division 1	4	0	0	0	4	0
Paris Saint-Germain	Total		23	0	2	0	25	0
Paris FC	1972–73	Division 1	4	0	0	0	4	0
Paris FC	1973–74	Division 1	1	0	0	0	1	0
Paris FC	Total		5	0	0	0	5	0
Career total			46	0	5	0	51	0

== Honours ==
Paris Saint-Germain

- Division 2: 1970–71
