= Jacques Rémond =

French footballer (born 1948)

Personal information
- Full name: Jacques Rémond
- Date of birth: 23 January 1948 (age 78)
- Place of birth: Nice, France
- Height: 1.76 m (5 ft 9 in)
- Position: Forward

Senior career*
Years	Team	Apps	(Gls)
1967–1969	Monaco	19	(1)
1969–1970	Cannes	14	(1)
1970–1972	Paris Saint-Germain	38	(14)
1972–1973	Avignon	22	(3)
Total		93	(19)
- * Club domestic league appearances and goals

Jacques "Jacky" Rémond (born 23 January 1948) is a French former professional footballer who played as a forward.

== Career ==
Jacques Rémond, who sometimes goes by the nickname of Jacky, began his professional career at Monaco in 1967. He stayed there two seasons before joining another club in the south of France, Cannes.

In 1970, when Paris Saint-Germain was being created, Rémond joined the club. He became the first goal-scorer in the Coupe de France in PSG's history, and helped them lift the Division 2 title in 1971. He finished as top-scorer in Paris Saint-Germain's first ever season. Rémond would leave the club in 1972, having scored 15 goals in 41 appearances. He ended his career at Avignon in 1973.

== Career statistics ==
Appearances and goals by club, season and competition
Club	Season	League			Cup		Total	
Club	Season	Division	Apps	Goals	Apps	Goals	Apps	Goals
Monaco	1967–68	Division 1	8	0	0	0	8	0
Monaco	1968–69	Division 1	11	1	0	0	11	1
Monaco	Total		19	1	0	0	19	1
Cannes	1969–70	Division 2	14	1	0	0	14	1
Paris Saint-Germain	1970–71	Division 2	26	10	3	1	29	11
Paris Saint-Germain	1971–72	Division 1	12	4	0	0	12	4
Paris Saint-Germain	Total		38	14	3	1	41	15
Avignon	1972–73	Division 2	22	3	0	0	22	3
Career total			93	19	3	1	96	20

== Honours ==
Paris Saint-Germain

- Division 2: 1970–71
