= Stade Georges Lefèvre =

Stadium in Saint-Germain-en-Laye, France

Coordinates: 48.9126°N 2.0815°E

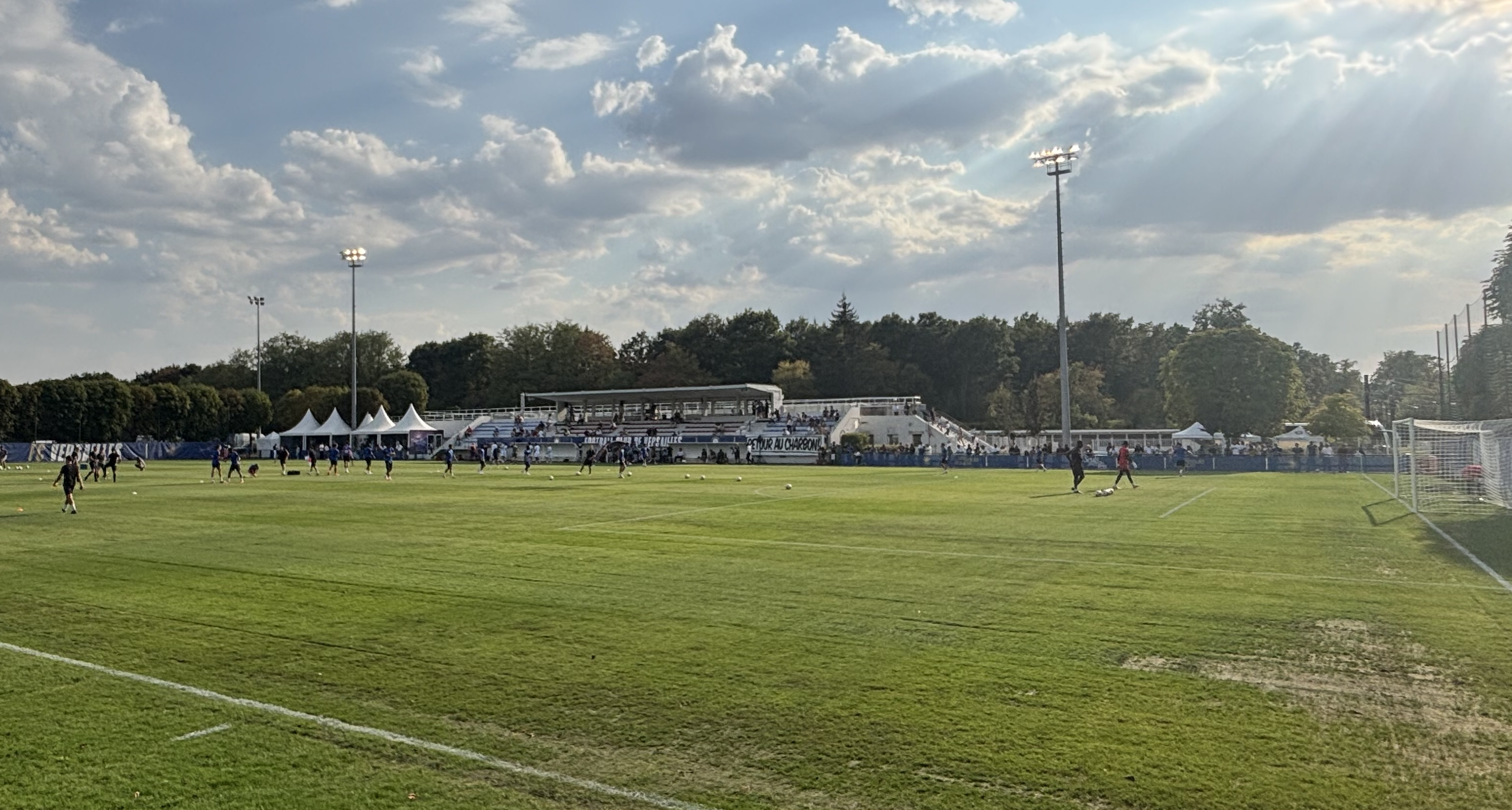
- The stadium in August 2026
- Interactive map of Stade Georges Lefèvre
- Former names: Stade des Loges (1904–1945)
- Location: Saint-Germain-en-Laye, France
- Capacity: 2,164
- Record attendance: 4,593 (Stade Saint-Germain vs. Évreux AC, 9 March 1969)

Construction
- Opened: 21 June 1904; 122 years ago

Tenant
- FC Versailles 78 (2025–present)

The Stade Georges Lefèvre (French pronunciation: [stad ʒɔʁʒ ləfɛvʁ]), formerly known as the Stade des Loges ([stad de lɔʒ]), is a football stadium in Saint-Germain-en-Laye, near Paris, France. It is the main stadium of the Camp des Loges, the former training ground of French football club Paris Saint-Germain FC (PSG). Between 1904 and 1970, it was the home stadium of Stade Saint-Germain. It then hosted PSG from 1970 until 2024, when they left for the newly-built Campus PSG.

FC Versailles 78 became tenant of the stadium in 2025.

== History ==
The Stade Georges Lefèvre was inaugurated on 21 June 1904, under the name of Stade des Loges, to coincide with the foundation of now-dissolved French football club Stade Saint-Germain that same year. It is part of the Camp des Loges, the former training ground of PSG. Located in the forest of Saint-Germain-en-Laye, the complex has 40 fields for different sports and covers an area of 12 hectares.

In 1945, following the death of Stade Saint-Germain player Georges Lefèvre during World War II in 1940, the Stade des Loges changed its name to Stade Georges Lefèvre in his honor. It has a seating capacity of 2,164 spectators distributed over three stands, but can hold more people standing up. On 9 March 1969, 4,593 supporters attended Stade Saint-Germain's 2–1 victory over Évreux AC in the round of 16 of the 1968–69 Coupe de France. It still stands as the venue's attendance record.

After the foundation of Paris Saint-Germain, product of the merger between Stade Saint-Germain and fellow Parisian side Paris FC on August 12, 1970, it was one of the home grounds of the new club's male first team until they moved into the Parc des Princes in 1974. The Stade Georges Lefèvre hosted home matches for the women's team between 1971 and 2024, and those of PSG's male and female academy sides from 1975 to 2024. They all moved to Campus PSG, the club's new training ground in nearby Poissy, in January 2024.

In July 2025, it was confirmed that FC Versailles 78 would play its home matches at the Stade Georges Lefèvre for the 2025–26 Championnat National season.

== Former and current tenants ==
Team	Stade Georges Lefèvre	Source
(France) Stade Saint-Germain	1904–1970	
(France) Paris Saint-Germain FC	1970–1971; 1972–1974	
(France) Paris Saint-Germain FC (women)	1971–2024	
(France) Paris Saint-Germain FC Youth Academy	1975–2024	
(France) FC Versailles 78	2025–Present	

== See also ==
- Parc des Princes
- Camp des Loges
- Campus PSG
