= List of Paris Saint-Germain FC managers =

Paris Saint-Germain FC have had 32 managers, 18 of whom have won at least one trophy. Former Spanish international Luis Enrique is the club's current manager, having been in charge since July 2023. Pierre Phelipon, appointed in August 1970, was PSG's first manager. He was also one of only two player-managers in the club's history, the other being Jean-Michel Larqué. Phelipon guided the Parisians to their first trophy, the Ligue 2 title, in 1971.

Georges Peyroche managed PSG for three years and seven months, making him the club's longest-serving manager. He led Paris to consecutive Coupe de France triumphs in 1982 and 1983, securing the first major trophies in the club's history. In 1986, Gérard Houllier became the first manager to guide PSG to the French league title. Since then, Artur Jorge, Carlo Ancelotti, Laurent Blanc, Unai Emery, Thomas Tuchel, Mauricio Pochettino, Christophe Galtier and Luis Enrique have all added league championships to the club's honours list. During their brief spells in charge, Alain Giresse and Guy Lacombe won a Trophée des Champions and a Coupe de France, respectively.

Luis Enrique is the club's most successful manager in terms of trophies won, with thirteen. In his three seasons in charge, PSG won two consecutive UEFA Champions League titles, two UEFA Super Cup, one FIFA Intercontinental Cup, three Ligue 1 championships, two Coupe de France, and three Trophée des Champions. Laurent Blanc ranks second with eleven trophies, including three Ligue 1 titles, two Coupe de France, three Coupe de la Ligue, and three Trophée des Champions. Unai Emery completes the podium with seven trophies and is closely followed by Thomas Tuchel with six. Tuchel also led PSG to their first Champions League final in 2020.

Former PSG players Luis Fernandez, Ricardo, Mauricio Pochettino, Vahid Halilhodžić, Antoine Kombouaré and Paul Le Guen all enjoyed varying degrees of success as managers. Fernandez won five trophies across two separate spells, including the UEFA Cup Winners' Cup in 1996 and the UEFA Intertoto Cup in 2001. He also holds the club record for most matches managed, with 244. Ricardo lost two European finals, the 1996 UEFA Super Cup and the 1997 UEFA Cup Winners' Cup final, but won the Coupe de France and Coupe de la Ligue in 1998. Under Pochettino, PSG secured their tenth French league title. Halilhodžić and Kombouaré each won a Coupe de France, while Le Guen claimed a Coupe de la Ligue title.

== Managers ==
As of 21 November 2026.

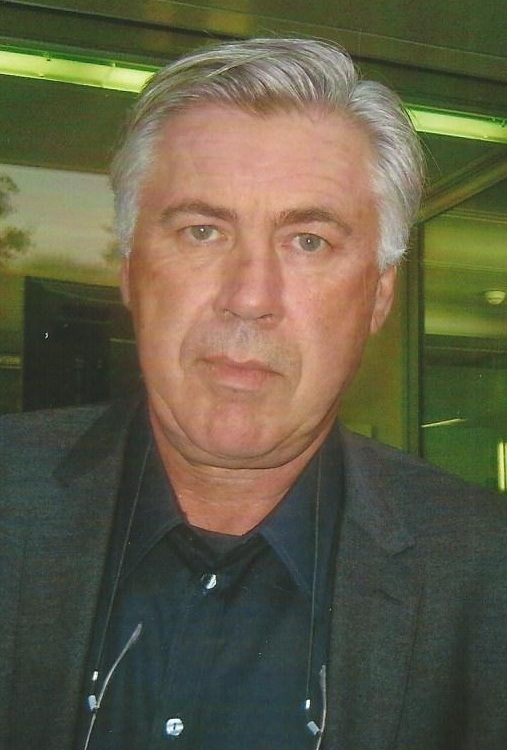
Carlo Ancelotti

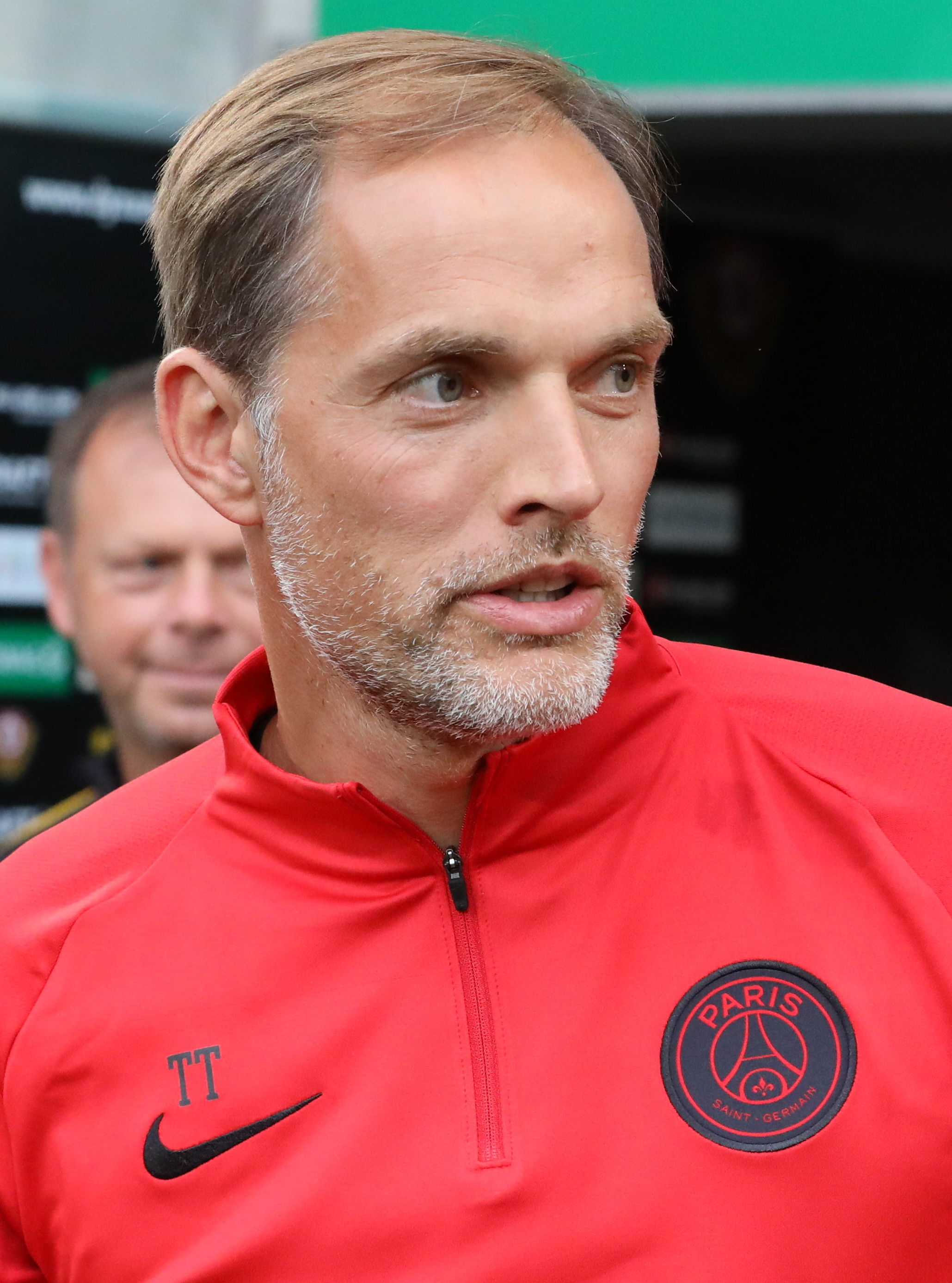
Thomas Tuchel

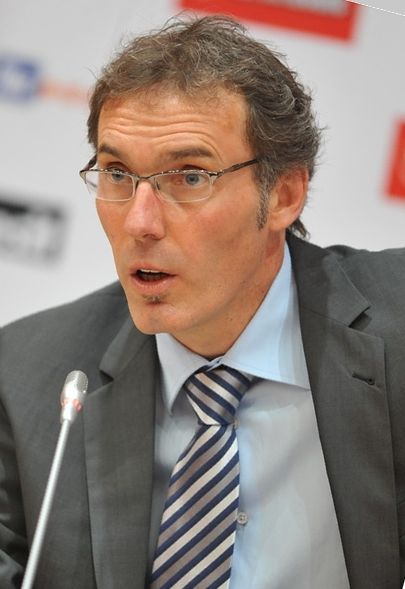
Laurent Blanc

No.	Manager	Tenure	M	W	D	L	GF	GA	GD	Win %
1	(France) Pierre Phelipon	Aug. 1970 – May 1972	74	30	22	22	112	97	+15	40.54
2	(France) Robert Vicot	Aug. 1972 – Aug. 1975	131	65	33	33	265	180	+85	49.62
3	(France) Just Fontaine	Sep. 1975 – Jun. 1976	41	15	12	14	66	58	+8	36.59
4	(Socialist Federal Republic of Yugoslavia) Velibor Vasović	Aug. 1976 – May 1977; Nov. 1978 – Oct. 1979	73	31	14	28	128	120	+8	42.47
5	(Socialist Federal Republic of Yugoslavia) Ilija Pantelić	May 1977 – Jun. 1977	4	2	2	0	7	2	+5	50.00
6	(France) Jean-Michel Larqué	Aug. 1977 – Aug. 1978	48	17	11	20	88	81	+7	35.42
7	(France) Pierre Alonzo	Aug. 1978 – Nov. 1978	10	3	3	4	16	15	+1	30.00
	No Manager (Note: On November 4, 1978, Paris Saint-Germain visited Monaco for a league match of the 1978–79 season. Manager Pierre Alonzo had unexpectedly resigned, and his replacement, Velibor Vasović, had yet to arrive. Club president Francis Borelli announced the starting lineup that day. This is the only time PSG have played an official match without a manager on the bench. They lost 2–1.)	November 4, 1978	1	0	0	1	1	2	−1	0.00
8	(France) Camille Choquier	Oct. 1979	3	2	0	1	5	3	+2	66.67
9	(France) Georges Peyroche	Nov. 1979 – Jun. 1983; Apr. 1984 – Mar. 1985	211	100	46	65	350	273	+77	47.39
10	(France) Lucien Leduc	Jul. 1983 – Mar. 1984	38	17	12	9	56	39	+17	44.74
11	(France) Christian Coste	Apr. 1985 – Jun. 1985	16	6	3	7	21	25	−4	37.50
12	(France) Gérard Houllier	Jul. 1985 – Oct. 1987; Feb. 1988 – Jun. 1988	123	55	34	34	146	107	+39	44.72
13	(France) Erick Mombaerts	Oct. 1987 – Dec. 1987	8	1	3	4	6	12	−6	12.50
14	(Socialist Federal Republic of Yugoslavia) Tomislav Ivić	Jul. 1988 – May 1990	86	41	21	24	111	88	+23	47.67
15	(France) Henri Michel	Jul. 1990 – May 1991	41	15	12	14	42	44	−2	36.59
16	(Portugal) Artur Jorge	Jul. 1991 – May 1994; Oct. 1998 – Mar. 1999	167	84	53	30	236	118	+118	50.30
17	(France) Luis Fernandez	Jul. 1994 – May 1996; Dec. 2000 – May 2003	244	125	61	58	361	209	+152	51.23
18	(Brazil) Ricardo	Aug. 1996 – May 1998	106	54	24	28	164	106	+58	50.94
19	(France) Alain Giresse	Jul. 1998 – Oct. 1998	11	4	2	5	10	11	−1	36.36
20	(France) Philippe Bergeroo	Mar. 1999 – Dec. 2000	75	35	16	24	127	101	+26	46.67
21	(Bosnia and Herzegovina) Vahid Halilhodžić	Aug. 2003 – Feb. 2005	80	36	27	17	100	75	+25	45.00
22	(France) Laurent Fournier	Feb. 2005 – Dec. 2005	36	17	7	12	47	38	+9	47.22
23	(France) Guy Lacombe	Jan. 2006 – Jan. 2007	54	18	20	16	70	57	+13	33.33
24	(France) Paul Le Guen	Jan. 2007 – May 2009	132	62	30	40	167	127	+40	46.97
25	(France) Antoine Kombouaré	Aug. 2009 – Dec. 2011	134	61	39	34	205	138	+67	45.52
26	(Italy) Carlo Ancelotti	Dec. 2011 – May 2013	77	49	19	9	153	64	+89	63.64
27	(France) Laurent Blanc	Aug. 2013 – May 2016	173	126	31	16	391	126	+265	72.83
28	(Spain) Unai Emery	Aug. 2016 – May 2018	114	87	15	12	312	92	+220	76.32
29	(Germany) Thomas Tuchel	Aug. 2018 – Dec. 2020	127	95	13	19	337	103	+234	74.80
30	(Argentina) Mauricio Pochettino	Jan. 2021 – Jul. 2022	84	55	15	14	186	78	+108	65.48
31	(France) Christophe Galtier	Jul. 2022 – Jul. 2023	50	34	6	10	120	53	+67	68.00
32	(Spain) Luis Enrique	Jul. 2023 – Present	191	130	34	27	467	188	+279	68.06

== Honours ==
As of 2026 UEFA Super Cup.

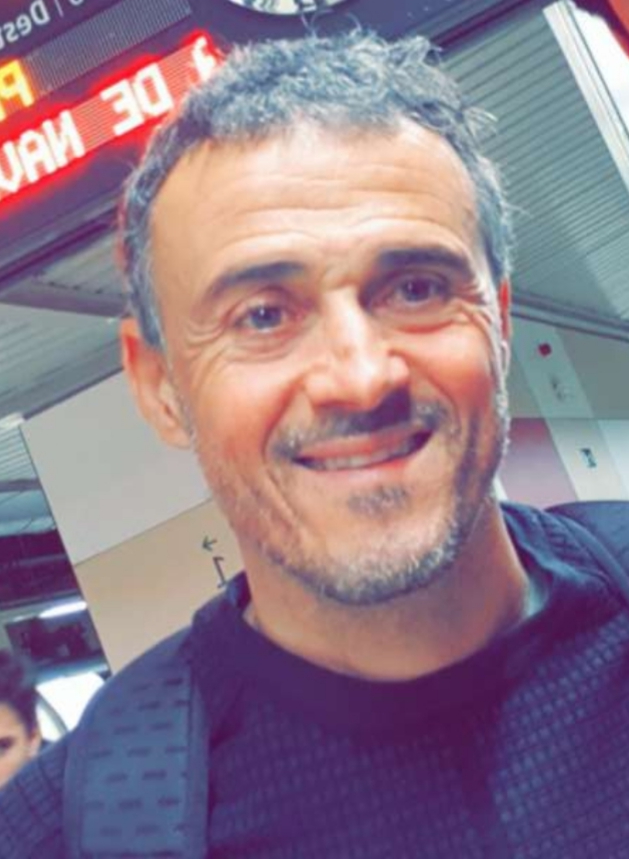
Luis Enrique

Rank	Manager	L1	L2	CdF	CdL	TdC	UCL	UCWC	UEL	USC	UIC	FCWC	FIC	Total
1	(Spain) Luis Enrique	3		2		3	2			2			1	13
2	(France) Laurent Blanc	3		2	3	3								11
3	(Spain) Unai Emery	1		2	2	2								7
4	(Germany) Thomas Tuchel	2		1	1	2								6
5	(France) Luis Fernandez			1	1	1		1			1			5
6	(Argentina) Mauricio Pochettino	1		1		1								3
7	(Portugal) Artur Jorge	1		1										2
8	(France) Christophe Galtier	1				1								2
9	(France) Georges Peyroche			2										2
10	(Brazil) Ricardo			1	1									2
11	(France) Gérard Houllier	1												1
12	(Italy) Carlo Ancelotti	1												1
13	(Bosnia and Herzegovina) Vahid Halilhodžić			1										1
14	(France) Guy Lacombe			1										1
15	(France) Antoine Kombouaré			1										1
16	(France) Paul Le Guen				1									1
17	(France) Alain Giresse					1								1
18	(France) Pierre Phelipon		1											1
