= Jean-Pierre Destrumelle =

French footballer (1941–2002)

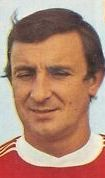
- Destrumelle with Valenciennes in 1977

Personal information
- Date of birth: 2 January 1941
- Place of birth: Cambrai, France
- Date of death: April 2002 (aged 61)
- Place of death: Sartène, France
- Height: 1.72 m (5 ft 8 in)
- Position: Midfielder

Youth career
- 1949–1957: Rouen

Senior career*
Years	Team	Apps	(Gls)
1957–1966	Rouen	145	(24)
1966–1970	Marseille	116	(2)
1970–1972	Paris Saint-Germain	32	(0)
Total		293	(26)

International career
- France B
- France Amateurs
- France military

Managerial career
- 1973–1979: Valenciennes
- 1979–1980: Bastia
- 1980–1981: Lyon
- 1983–1984: Béziers
- 1985–1989: Gien
- 1989–1991: Orléans
- AC Ajaccio
- Porto Vecchio
- Sartène
- Valinco (youth)
- * Club domestic league appearances and goals

Jean-Pierre Destrumelle (2 January 1941 – April 2002) was a French professional football player and manager. As a player, he was a midfielder.

== International career ==
Destrumelle was a B, youth, amateur, and military international for France during his career.

== Honours ==
Marseille

- Coupe de France: 1968–69

Paris Saint-Germain

- Division 2: 1970–71
