= Michel Prost =

French footballer (born 1946)

Personal information
- Full name: Michel Prost
- Date of birth: 23 February 1946 (age 80)
- Place of birth: Charenton-le-Pont, France
- Height: 1.78 m (5 ft 10 in)
- Position: Forward

Youth career
- 1965–1966: Paris Université Club

Senior career*
Years	Team	Apps	(Gls)
1966–1967	Stade Saint-Germain		
1967–1969	Bataillon de Joinville	41	(11)
1969–1970	Stade Saint-Germain		
1970–1972	Paris Saint-Germain	70	(22)
1972–1973	Paris FC	33	(4)
1973	Nancy	13	(4)
1973–1976	Bastia	42	(9)
1976–1977	Red Star	44	(13)
1977–1978	Poissy	4	(1)
Total		247+	(64+)

International career
- France Amateurs
- France Military
- France B
- * Club domestic league appearances and goals

Michel Prost (born 23 February 1946) is a French former professional footballer who played as a forward. He is known for being one of the first "stars" in the history of Paris Saint-Germain.

== Club career ==
=== Early career ===
Prost was born in the town of Charenton-le-Pont, Île-de-France. In his teenage years, he played three different sports: football, rugby, and tennis. He was a youth footballer for Paris UC until 1966, when he joined Stade Saint-Germain. He went on to play for Bataillon de Joinville, a military team, from 1967 to 1969. Then, he returned to Stade Saint-Germain.

=== Paris Saint-Germain ===
In 1970, Stade Saint-Germain merged with Paris FC (PFC) to create Paris Saint-Germain (PSG). Therefore, Prost joined the newly formed club. He would make his debut for PSG in a 1–1 draw against Poitiers on 23 August 1970, the first game in the club's history. His first goal for the Parisian club came in a 3–2 win over Quevilly six days later.

With PSG, Prost would lift the only title of his career, the Division 2 title, in 1971. He finished the season with 10 goals to his name in 32 league appearances, which made him the joint top-scorer for the club in the league. He would continue with the club for the following season in Division 1. In the 1971–72 season, Prost scored 12 goals in 38 league appearances, as PSG managed to reach a safe 16th-place finish. However, in 1972, PSG split into two; PFC kept the first team players, stayed in the first division, but lost the club identity, while PSG was given the reserve team players, relegated to the Division 3, and kept the club identity. This meant that as a player with a professional contract, Prost now played for Paris FC. For Paris Saint-Germain, he had made 74 appearances and scored 22 goals in all competitions.

=== Paris FC, Nancy, and Bastia ===
Prost played for Paris FC from 1972 to 1973. He would score 4 goals in 37 appearances for the club in all competitions before signing for Nancy. Eventually, he would only stay at Nancy for six months, signing with Bastia in December 1973.

In the second half of 1976, Prost suffered an injury to his hip and was told he could no longer play football at such a high level. He ended his professional career in October 1976 and left Bastia.

=== Red Star and Poissy ===
After his injury, Prost went to play for Red Star in a semi-professional setting. He would formally retire from playing football in 1977. Soon after, his former Stade Saint-Germain manager, Roger Quenolle, invited him to become sporting director at Poissy, where he was coach. Prost accepted, but also worked for Chrysler on the side. He would also go on to play 4 games and score 1 goal for Poissy in the Division 2 in the 1977–78 season.

== International career ==
Prost played for several different national teams of France. He represented his country at amateur, military, and B level.

== Personal life ==
Michel has a son named Nicolas (born 1971/1972).

After his football career, Prost would go on to work for Peugeot-Citroën in Poissy. Later in his life, he would be a secretary at the Syndicat FO. In the 2010s, he would also become a delegate in the town of Poissy. He helped organize the plans for Paris Saint-Germain's new training center in the town.

In September 2021, Prost was invited to a Paris Saint-Germain match at the Parc des Princes by the club's president, Nasser Al-Khelaifi. He received a jersey with his name on it from Al-Khelaifi.

== Career statistics ==
Appearances and goals by club, season and competition
Club	Season	League			Cup		Total	
Club	Season	Division	Apps	Goals	Apps	Goals	Apps	Goals
Stade Saint-Germain	1966–67	CFA			3 (Note: Cup statistics may be inaccurate during Prost's spells at Stade Saint-Germain, Bataillon de Joinville, Red Star, and Poissy.)	1	3	1
Bataillon de Joinville	1967–68	Division 2	30	8	0	0	30	8
Bataillon de Joinville	1968–69	Division 2	11	3	0	0	11	3
Bataillon de Joinville	Total		41	11	0	0	41	11
Stade Saint-Germain	1968–69	CFA			8	3	8	3
Stade Saint-Germain	1969–70	CFA			1	1	1	1
Stade Saint-Germain	Total				9	4	9	4
Paris Saint-Germain	1970–71	Division 2	32	10	3	0	35	10
Paris Saint-Germain	1971–72	Division 1	38	12	1	0	39	12
Paris Saint-Germain	Total		70	22	4	0	74	22
Paris FC	1972–73	Division 1	33	4	4	0	37	4
Nancy	1973–74	Division 1	13	4	0	0	13	4
Bastia	1973–74	Division 1	11	2	4	0	15	2
Bastia	1974–75	Division 1	26	7	7	1	33	8
Bastia	1975–76	Division 1	5	0	0	0	5	0
Bastia	Total		42	9	11	1	53	10
Red Star	1975–76	Division 2	26	9	3	0	29	9
Red Star	1976–77	Division 2	18	4	0	0	18	4
Red Star	Total		44	13	3	0	47	13
Poissy	1977–78	Division 2	4	1	0	0	4	1
Career total			247	64	34	6	281	70

== Honours ==
Paris Saint-Germain

- Division 2: 1970–71
