= Zacharie Noah =

Cameroonian footballer

Personal information
- Date of birth: 2 February 1937
- Place of birth: Yaoundé, French Cameroons
- Date of death: 8 January 2017 (aged 79)
- Place of death: Yaoundé, Cameroon
- Position: Defender

Senior career*
Years	Team	Apps	(Gls)
1956–1957	Stade Saint-Germain		
1957–1962	Sedan-Torcy	96	(0)
- * Club domestic league appearances and goals

Zacharie Noah (2 February 1937 – 8 January 2017) was a Cameroonian professional footballer who won the Coupe de France in 1961 with Sedan-Torcy. Noah, who played as a defender, had previously played for Stade Saint-Germain.

He was the father of French tennis player Yannick Noah and the grandfather of basketball player Joakim Noah.

He died on 8 January 2017, at the age of 79.
