= Roland Mitoraj =

French footballer (born 1940)

Personal information
- Date of birth: 5 February 1940 (age 86)
- Place of birth: Bourges, France
- Height: 1.76 m (5 ft 9 in)
- Position: Centre-back

Youth career
- 1957–1958: Montluçon

Senior career*
Years	Team	Apps	(Gls)
1958–1970	Saint-Étienne	213	(23)
1970–1972	Paris Saint-Germain	65	(0)
1972–1974	Bordeaux	36	(0)
1974–1976	Aix	11+ (Note: Statistics for the 1975–76 season are unknown.)	(1+)
Total		325+	(24+)

International career
1967–1968	France	3	(0)

Managerial career
- 1974–1976: Aix
- 1976–1990: Cournon d'Auvergne
- 1990–1991: Saint-Étienne U17
- 1991–1992: Saint-Étienne (assistant)
- 1992–1993: Saint-Étienne B
- 1993–1997: Saint-Étienne U17
- 1997–2003: Saint-Julien Chapteuil
- * Club domestic league appearances and goals

Roland Mitoraj (born 5 February 1940) is a French former professional footballer and manager.

== International career ==
Mitoraj played three matches for France from 1967 to 1968.

== After football ==
From 1976 to 1990, Mitoraj worked for Adidas. He would sell products from Le Coq Sportif and Arena, brands which depended on Adidas. He was a commercial vendor. Simultaneously, he coached Cournon-d'Auvergne.

In 2003, Mitoraj retired to go live in Vorey for four years. He would watch his favorite team Saint-Étienne at the Stade Geoffroy-Guichard every weekend. However, in December 2007, he came out of retirement in order to become an administrator at Saint-Étienne.

== Honours ==
=== Player ===
Saint-Étienne

- Division 1: 1963–64, 1966–67, 1967–68, 1968–69, 1969–70
- Division 2: 1962–63
- Coupe de France: 1967–68, 1969–70; runner-up: 1959–60
- Challenge des Champions: 1967, 1968, 1969

Paris Saint-Germain

- Division 2: 1970–71

=== Manager ===
Aix

- Coupe de Provence: 1975; runner-up: 1976
