= Sylvain Léandri =

French footballer (born 1948)

Personal information
- Date of birth: 7 February 1948 (age 77)
- Place of birth: Nice, France
- Height: 1.74 m (5 ft 9 in)
- Position(s): Defender, midfielder

Senior career*
Years	Team	Apps	(Gls)
1965–1971	Nice	47	(1)
1971–1972	Paris Saint-Germain	16	(0)
1972–1973	Paris FC	11	(0)
1973–1978	AC Ajaccio		
1978–1980	Gazélec Ajaccio	0	(0)
- * Club domestic league appearances and goals

Sylvain Léandri (born 7 February 1948) is a French former professional footballer who played as a defender and midfielder.

== International career ==
Léandri was a youth international for France.

== Honours ==
Nice

- Division 2: 1969–70
