= Guy Delhumeau =

French footballer (born 1947)

Personal information
- Date of birth: 14 January 1947 (age 79)
- Place of birth: Le Rochereau, France
- Height: 1.82 m (6 ft 0 in)
- Position: Goalkeeper

Youth career
- Villiers-en-Lieu

Senior career*
Years	Team	Apps	(Gls)
1965–1971	Poitiers		
1971–1972	Paris Saint-Germain	31	(0)
1972–1974	Paris FC	19	(0)
1974–1975	Boulogne	33	(0)
1975–1976	Nice	0	(0)
1976–1979	Montmorillon		

International career
- France Olympic
- * Club domestic league appearances and goals

Guy Delhumeau (born 14 January 1947) is a French former professional footballer who played as a goalkeeper. He notably played professionally for Paris Saint-Germain, Paris FC, Boulogne, and Nice, and represented France at the 1968 Summer Olympics.
