= Stade de la Cavée Verte =

Football stadium in Le Havre, France

Stade Charles-Argentin
- Stade de la Cavée Verte
- Interactive map of Stade Charles-Argentin
- Location: Le Havre, France
- Coordinates: 49°30′9″N 0°6′24″E

Construction
- Opened: 1918

Tenant
- Havre AC (1918–1970)

Stade de la Cavée Verte (French pronunciation: [stad də la kave vɛʁt]) is a football stadium in Le Havre, France.
