= Camp des Loges =

Sports facility in Saint-Germain-en-Laye, France

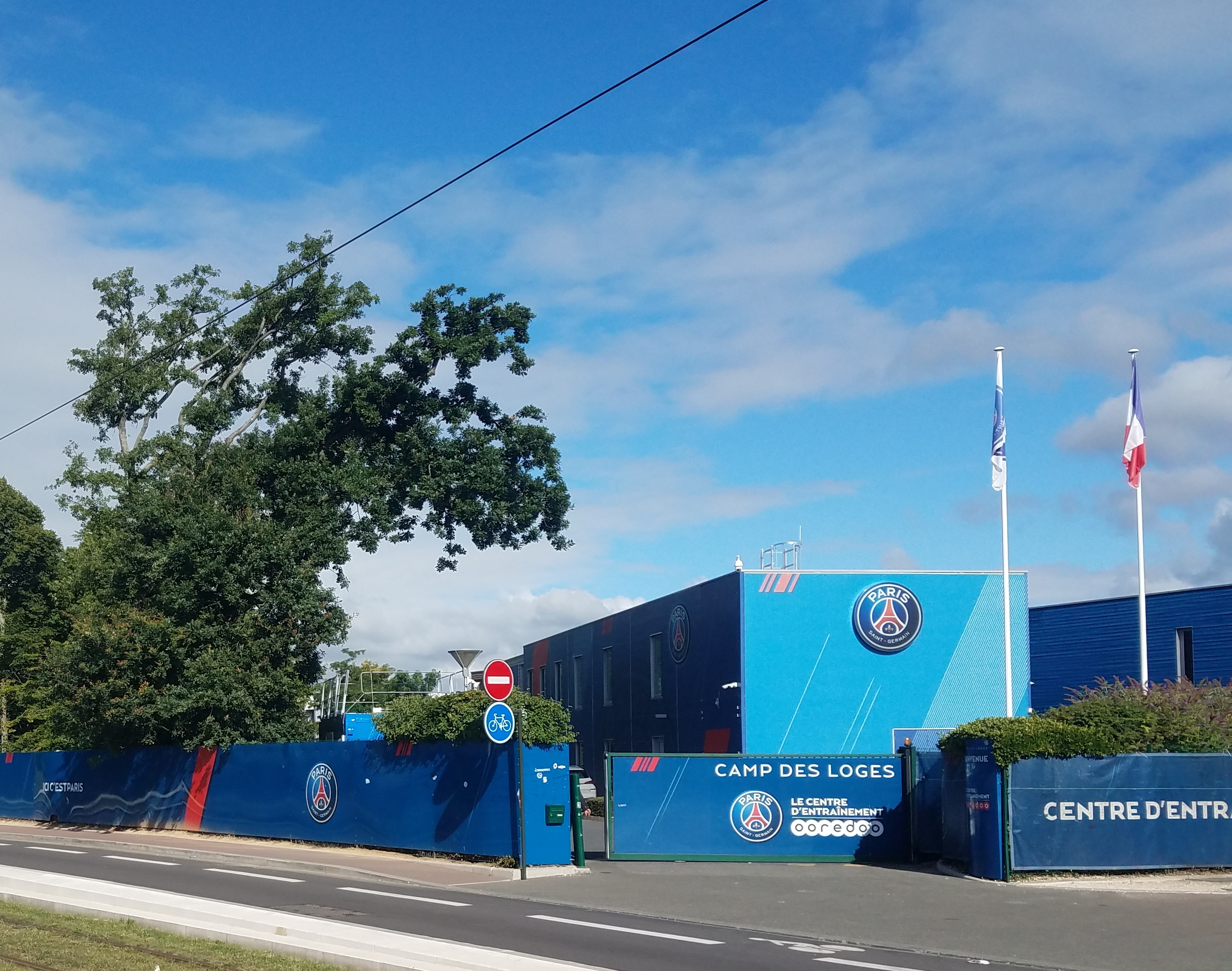
- The Camp des Loges's entrance in 2022
- Interactive map of Camp des Loges
- Full name: Stade Georges Lefèvre Training Center
- Former names: Stade des Loges (1904–1945)
- Location: Saint-Germain-en-Laye, France

Construction
- Opened: 21 June 1904; 122 years ago
- Renovated: 4 November 2008; 17 years ago
- Cost: €5m (2008)

Tenants
- Association Paris Saint-Germain (1970–present); Stade Français (2024–present)

The Stade Georges Lefèvre Training Center (French: Centre d'entraînement du Stade Georges Lefèvre), commonly known as the Camp des Loges, is a sports facility in Saint-Germain-en-Laye, France. Since October 2024, it has served as the training facility of rugby union club Stade Français; from July 1970 to June 2023, football club Paris Saint-Germain (PSG) was the tenant.

The current version of the Camp des Loges opened in November 2008, and is the second to have been built on the site, with the first opening its doors in June 1904. The main stadium of the Camp des Loges, the Stade Georges Lefèvre, was also operated by PSG.

Paris Saint-Germain left the Camp des Loges for the newly built Campus PSG in 2023. The club's youth academy and female team also moved to the new site in 2024. The Camp des Loges continues to be the headquarters of the Association Paris Saint-Germain.

== History ==
The Stade Georges Lefèvre Training Center was inaugurated on 21 June 1904, under the name of Stade des Loges, to coincide with the foundation of now-dissolved French football club Stade Saint-Germain that same year. It was nicknamed Camp des Loges after the nearby military base of the same name reserved for soldiers of the French Army.

In 1945, following the death of Stade Saint-Germain player Georges Lefèvre during World War II in 1940, the Stade des Loges changed its name to Stade Georges Lefèvre in his honor. Its main football stadium, the homonymously called Stade Georges Lefèvre, has a seating capacity of 2,164 spectators distributed over three stands, but can hold more people standing up. In 1970, following the merger of Paris FC and Stade Saint-Germain to form Paris Saint-Germain (PSG), Camp des Loges became the club's training ground. Since then, the site also serves as the headquarters of the Association Paris Saint-Germain.

PSG's male team conducted their first training session on the pitches of the Camp des Loges on 28 July 1970. Former club president Guy Crescent, who was in attendance that day, famously declared to the press, "From now on, you belong to a family. Paris Football Club and Stade Saint-Germain are over. We are now Paris Saint-Germain!" Camp des Loges was also the training facility of the women's team from 1971 until 2012, when they moved to Bougival, and of the club's academy starting on 4 November 1975.

Renovations on the Camp des Loges began in January 2008 and finished on 4 November 2008, at a cost of €5m. In September 2013, the club signed a sponsorship contract with telecommunications company Ooredoo. As part of the deal, the Camp des Loges was renamed Ooredoo Training Centre. The deal lasted until the departure of PSG's male team. They trained one last time at the Camp des Loges on 2 June 2023. They moved to Campus PSG, located in nearby Poissy, in July 2023.

The women's team briefly returned to Camp des Loges in June 2023, before definitely moving into Campus PSG in January 2024. The club's academy also moved to the new site that month. Rugby union club Stade Français became the new tenants of the Camp des Loges in October 2024. However, the Association Paris Saint-Germain would continue to have its headquarters at the ground.

== Facilities ==
The Camp des Loges has facilities for track and field, field hockey, football, rugby sevens, beach volleyball and other beach sports, tennis, and padel spread over 12 hectares. Additionally, the complex has three stands for football, rugby and hockey; one club-house with a restaurant; locker rooms and sanitaries; and lighting for night sessions.

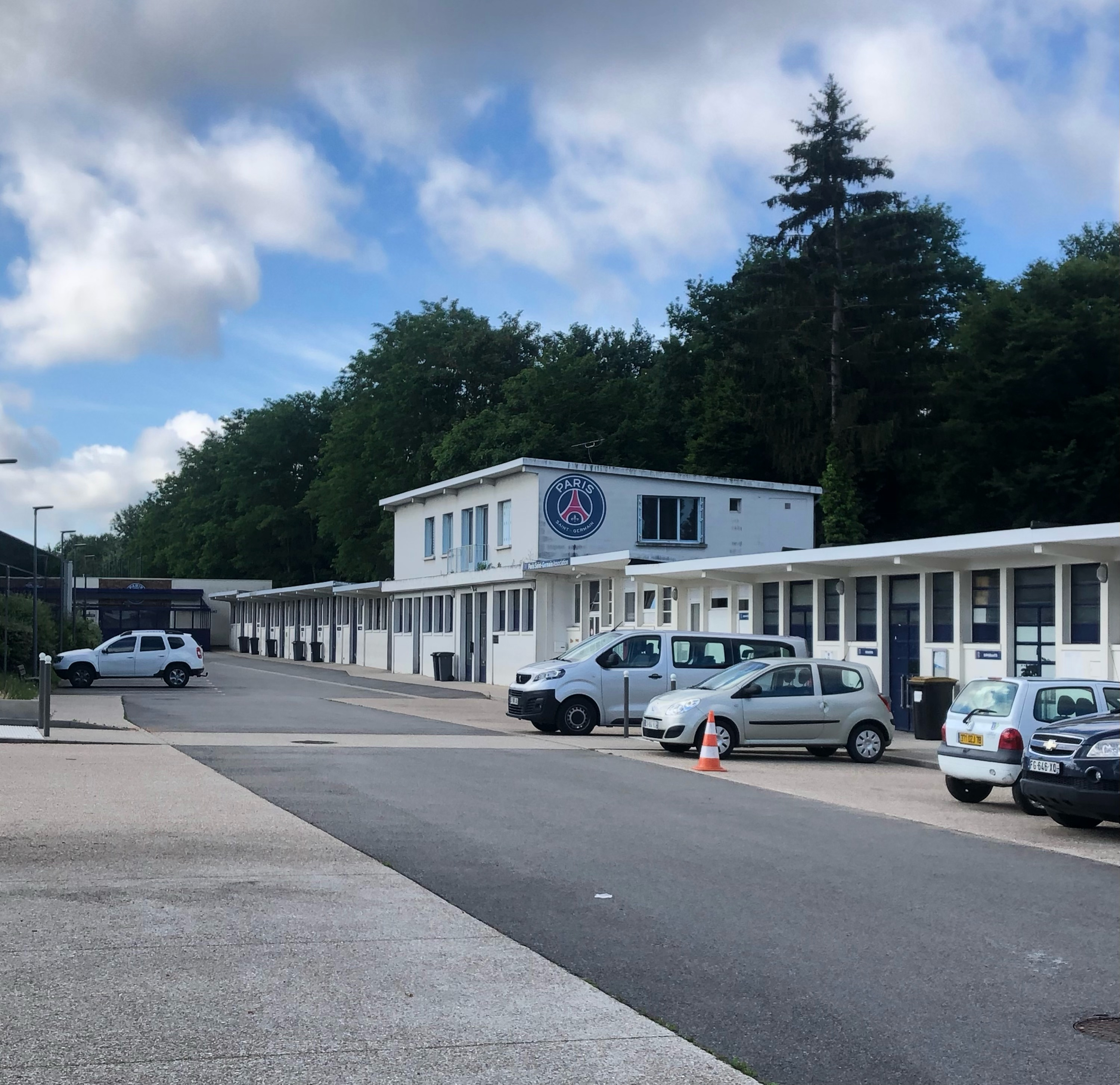
Camp des Loges in June 2022.

- One 400 metres athletics track with eight lanes.
- One jumping area for practicing high jump, triple jump and long jump.
- One area for practicing steeplechase.
- One 140 metres throwing area for practicing shot put.
- One archery range.
- One water-based hockey pitch.
- One sand-dressed hockey pitch.
- Five football pitches (three synthetic pitches and two grass pitches).
- One dedicated grass pitch for goalkeeper training.
- One synthetic pitch for rugby, renovated in 2018.
- Three beach volleyball fields.
- One beach sports field.
- 21 tennis courts, four covered.
- One mini tennis court.
- One tennis backboard wall.
- Two padel courts.

== Former and current tenants ==
Team / Organization	Camp des Loges	Source
(France) Stade Saint-Germain	1904–1970	
(France) Paris Saint-Germain FC	1970–2023	
(France) Association Paris Saint-Germain	1970–present	
(France) Paris Saint-Germain FC (women)	1971–2012; 2023–2024	
(France) Paris Saint-Germain FC Youth Academy	1975–2024	
(France) Stade Français	2024–present	

== See also ==
- Parc des Princes
- Stade Georges Lefèvre
- Campus PSG
