= Jean-Paul Rostagni =

French footballer (1948–2026)

Jean-Paul Rostagni (14 January 1948 – 10 August 2026) was a French professional footballer who played as a left-back.

== Career ==
Rostagni was born in Drap, Alpes-Maritimes on 14 January 1948. He played from 1966 to 1969 with Monaco. Then he moved to Bordeaux and played in 1971–72 for Paris FC. His last team was Nice.

From March 1969 to May 1973 he played 25 times for the France national team.

== Death ==
Rostagni died on 10 August 2026, at the age of 78.

== Sources ==
- Jacques Thibert, Les coqs du football, Paris, Calmann-Lévy, 1972, notice biographique de JP Rostagni, p. 63-75 (French)
