= Jean-Louis Brost =

French footballer (born 1951)

Personal information
- Date of birth: 30 May 1951 (age 75)
- Place of birth: Paris, France
- Height: 1.69 m (5 ft 7 in)
- Position: Forward

Senior career*
Years	Team	Apps	(Gls)
1969–1970	Stade Saint-Germain		
1970–1974	Paris Saint-Germain	81	(19)
1974–1976	Entente BFN	12	(1)
Total		93+	(20+)

International career
- France Amateurs
- * Club domestic league appearances and goals

Jean-Louis Brost (born 30 May 1951) is a French former professional footballer who played as a forward.

== Club career ==
Brost began his career at Stade Saint-Germain, the predecessor of Paris Saint-Germain. When PSG was formed in 1970, he joined the newly-introduced club. He would go on to make 93 appearances and score 20 goals in all competitions across four seasons. In 1974, Brost signed for Fontainebleau. However, after two years there, he retired from football.

== International career ==
Brost was an amateur international for France.

== After football ==
Later in Brost’s life, he became production director at Daniel Hechter Paris. He would also become executive director at RC Paris.

== Honours ==
Paris Saint-Germain

- Division 2: 1970–71
