= Campus PSG =

Training ground of Paris Saint-Germain FC

- Interactive map of Campus PSG
- Full name: Campus Paris Saint-Germain
- Location: Poissy, France
- Owner: Paris Saint-Germain FC
- Capacity: 1,100
- Type: Training ground

Construction
- Opened: 10 July 2023; 3 years ago
- Cost: €300m
- Architect: Jean-Michel Wilmotte

Tenants
- Paris Saint-Germain FC (2023–Present); Paris Saint-Germain FC (women) (2024–Present); Paris Saint-Germain FC Youth Academy (2024–Present)

Website
- Campus PSG

Campus PSG, officially known as Campus Paris Saint-Germain, is the training ground of French football club Paris Saint-Germain, used by the men and women's teams, as well as the youth academy of the club. Located in Poissy, on the western outskirts of Paris, France, it replaced Camp des Loges, the club's historic training center in nearby Saint-Germain-en-Laye.

The project was first mooted in 2012, with Poissy being chosen as the site in 2016. Owned and financed by PSG, construction began in February 2020 under the direction of French architect Jean-Michel Wilmotte, and an investment of €300m. The arrival of the men's football section in July 2023 marked the opening of Campus PSG. The women's football team and the PSG Academy joined them in January 2024. The club hosted an official opening ceremony at Campus PSG in November 2024.

The 59-hectare Campus PSG currently features 16 football pitches, the professional building housing the men's and women's football facilities, and the academy facilities. Its main pitch, with a capacity of 1,100 spectators, serves as the home stadium for the women's football section. Paris Saint-Germain Handball and Paris Saint-Germain Judo, along with their academies, are expected to move to Campus PSG in 2028, by which time the club plans to have built two judo dojos, two handball courts, and additional amenities, including a 5,000-capacity football stadium.

== History ==
Paris Saint-Germain began scouting locations for their new training ground in 2012. PSG's owners, Qatar Sports Investments, deemed the previous training ground, Camp des Loges, unsuitable for the club's ambitions. Saint-Germain-en-Laye, Thiverval-Grignon and Poissy were considered for the future training camp, with the latter being chosen to host it in 2016. Poissy, located in the western suburbs of Paris, is a 25-minute drive from the Parc des Princes. Construction began on 29 February 2020, with the mayor of Poissy, Karl Olive, and PSG deputy general manager Jean-Claude Blanc in attendance.

Conceived by French architect Jean-Michel Wilmotte, who also designed the Allianz Riviera and the Kaliningrad Stadium, the club invested €300m in the Campus Paris Saint-Germain. It is the home of Paris Saint-Germain FC, Paris Saint-Germain FC (women), and the Paris Saint-Germain FC Youth Academy. The men's football team moved into Campus PSG on 10 July 2023, marking the opening of the complex. They completed their first group training session there on 18 July 2023 and played their first match on 21 July 2023. It was a friendly match against Le Havre which ended in a 2–0 win for PSG.

Campus PSG welcomed the women's football team on 3 January 2024. Its main field serves as their home stadium except for matches played at the Parc des Princes or the Stade Jean-Bouin. They played their first match at Campus PSG on 9 January 2024, a 6–0 win over Lille OSC in the Première Ligue. This was also the first official match played there.

The club's youth football academy also moved into Campus PSG on 7 January 2024. The men's U19s played their first match at Campus PSG on 21 January 2024: a 5–0 win over Le Havre in the Championnat National U19. The men's U17s made their debut on 28 January 2024 with a 2–0 win against Versailles in the Championnat National U17. The women's U19s beat Guingamp 5–0 in the Championnat National Féminin U19 on 11 February 2024 in their first match there. The Espoirs, however, lost against Nantes 1–3 in the Challenge Espoirs in their inaugural match at Campus PSG on 26 October 2024.

Campus PSG was officially inaugurated on 21 November 2024 during an on-site ceremony in the presence of club president Nasser Al-Khelaifi, former PSG football players Youri Djorkaeff, Dominique Bathenay, Luis Fernandez, Bernard Lama, Laura Georges, Pauleta and Javier Pastore, former PSG handball player Nikola Karabatić, and tennis legend Novak Djokovic. In the second phase of the project, Campus PSG will house Paris Saint-Germain Handball and Paris Saint-Germain Judo, as well as their academies.

== Facilities ==
Covering an area of 59 hectares, Campus PSG features 16 football pitches. Its main pitch has a capacity for 1,100 spectators. The men's and women's football facilities, known as the professional building, include four therapeutic pools, a gymnasium, a restaurant, changing rooms, a medical treatment room, a performance area for fitness, video and analysis, 43 recovery rooms, and staff accommodation. The academy facilities feature nine playing fields and three buildings. The first is a sports area, the second is an educational center with 15 classrooms, and the third is a residential area. The structure is designed to house 140 young players between the ages of 13 and 19, with 131 bedrooms.

The club plans to build two judo dojos, two handball courts, five fields for the PSG Foundation, a polyclinic, a clubhouse, a hotel, a megastore, and a 5,000-seat football stadium by 2028. The clubhouse, a glass cube that will serve as the hub and access point to the grounds, will consist of a café, a community restaurant, a library, and an amphitheater with a capacity of 230 spectators. Three and a half hectares have also been set aside for vegetable gardens and fruit trees, allowing the training ground to be self-sufficient.

== Former and current tenants ==
Team	Campus PSG	Source
(France) Paris Saint-Germain FC	2023–Present	
(France) Paris Saint-Germain FC (women)	2024–Present	
(France) Paris Saint-Germain FC Youth Academy	2024–Present	

== See also ==
- Parc des Princes
- Camp des Loges
- Stade Georges Lefèvre
