= Daniel Solas =

French footballer (born 1946)

Personal information
- Full name: Daniel Solas
- Date of birth: 17 September 1946 (age 80)
- Place of birth: Gond-Pontouvre, France
- Height: 1.70 m (5 ft 7 in)
- Positions: Left-back; defensive midfielder

Youth career
- 1958–1965: GC Gond-Pontouvre

Senior career*
Years	Team	Apps	(Gls)
1965–1967	GC Gond-Pontouvre		
1967–1971	Angoulême	131	(2)
1971–1972	Paris Saint-Germain	26	(0)
1972–1973	Paris FC	25	(0)
1973–1975	Bastia	47	(0)
1975–1978	Caen	89	(1)
1978–1980	Amboise		
Total		318+	(3+)

International career
- France U21
- * Club domestic league appearances and goals

Daniel Solas (born 17 September 1946) is a French former professional footballer who played as a left-back and defensive midfielder.

== Club career ==
Solas played for seven different clubs during his career: Gond-Pontouvre, Angoulême, Paris Saint-Germain, Paris FC, Bastia, Caen, and Amboise. He made a total of 318 appearances and scored 3 goals in the first two tiers of France.

== International career ==
Solas was a U21 international for France.
