= Bernard Guignedoux =

French football player and manager (1947–2021)

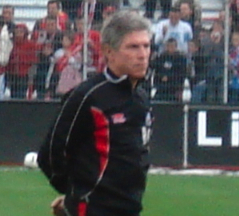
- Guignedoux during a warm-up of Valenciennes

Personal information
- Full name: Bernard Guignedoux
- Date of birth: 31 January 1947
- Place of birth: Saint-Germain-en-Laye, France
- Date of death: 1 January 2021 (aged 73)
- Place of death: Clamart, France
- Height: 1.68 m (5 ft 6 in)
- Position: Forward

Youth career
- 1956–1961: FC Andrésy
- 1961–1965: RC Paris
- 1962–1963: → Levallois-Perret (loan)

Senior career*
Years	Team	Apps	(Gls)
1965–1966	RC Paris	22	(3)
1966–1970	Stade Saint-Germain		
1970–1972	Paris Saint-Germain	69	(14)
1972–1974	Paris FC	54	(8)
1974–1977	Monaco	94	(4)
1977–1980	Paris FC	35	(2)
Total		274+	(31+)

Managerial career
- 1981–1992: Paris Saint-Germain C
- 1992–1999: Paris Saint-Germain U15
- 1999–2001: Paris Saint-Germain C
- 2002: Paris Saint-Germain C
- 2003–2004: Strasbourg (assistant)
- 2005–2009: Valenciennes (assistant)
- * Club domestic league appearances and goals

Bernard Guignedoux (31 January 1947 – 1 January 2021) was a French professional football player and manager. He is known for being the first goal-scorer in the history of Paris Saint-Germain.

== Playing career ==
Guignedoux was a graduate of the RC Paris academy. He played one season with the club in the Division 2 before joining Stade Saint-Germain in 1966, where he continued studies while playing third-tier football. In 1970, Stade Saint-Germain merged with Paris FC to create Paris Saint-Germain; therefore, Guignedoux joined the newly formed club.

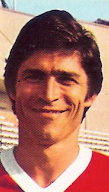
Guignedoux with Monaco in 1976

Guignedoux made his debut for PSG in the first game of the club's history on 23 August 1970, a 1–1 league draw against Poitiers. He scored the first goal in PSG history as he found the top-left corner from a shot on a free-kick.

In an interview with PSG70 in 2005, Guignedoux recalled his favorite memory from his time as a PSG player being the promotion to the Division 1 in 1971. "There was extraordinary enthusiasm. I remember the construction of the team with the merging of experienced professionals and young players. It was a fabulous year," he said. Guignedoux's final match for PSG was a 1–0 loss against Angers on 27 May 1972.

In 1972, Paris Saint-Germain split into two, with the re-formed Paris FC staying in the first division, and PSG getting the reserve players while being relegated to the third tier. As Guignedoux had a professional contract at the club, he joined Paris FC and left Paris Saint-Germain. Two years later, in 1974, he joined Monaco, who were also competing in the Division 1.

After three seasons in Monaco, Guignedoux returned to his former club Paris FC. He spent three years at the club before retiring in 1980, at the age of 33.

== Post-playing career ==
Guignedoux's involvement with football did not end after retiring from the sport itself. Firstly, in 1980, he became a physiotherapist for his former club Paris FC. He then spent a short amount of time as a P.E. teacher before becoming the coach of the Paris Saint-Germain C team in 1981.

After eleven years at the position of PSG's C team coach, Guignedoux became the coach of PSG's under-15 squad. He stayed there for seven years before returning to his former role of C team coach in 1999. In July 2001, Guignedoux once again left the role of PSG C team coach, this time to be part of PSG's youth system. He returned to the PSG C team in February 2002, only to go back to his position in the youth academy five months later.

In October 2003, Guignedoux became the assistant manager of Strasbourg, under the direction of Antoine Kombouaré. Twelve months later, he stepped down from the position to become a scout for the club's youth academy. In June 2005, Guignedoux joined Valenciennes as the assistant manager of the club, once again in a collaboration with Kombouaré. Valenciennes won the Ligue 2 and achieved promotion in Guignedoux's first season as assistant coach. From 2009 to June 2012, Guignedoux was the technical director in the amateur departments of Paris Saint-Germain.

On 16 December 2012, Guignedoux honored Ezequiel Lavezzi with a trophy for being the scorer of the 3,000th goal in PSG history; Guignedoux was the first ever scorer for the club, back in 1970.

== Health issues and death ==
On 12 April 2020, at the age of 73, Guignedoux was hospitalized. This was due to an unnamed "serious disease" he contracted, which left his health condition deteriorating.

Guignedoux died on 1 January 2021, at the age of 73.

== Career statistics ==
Appearances and goals by club, season and competition
Club	Season	League			Cup		Continental		Total	
Club	Season	Division	Apps	Goals	Apps	Goals	Apps	Goals	Apps	Goals
RC Paris	1965–66	Division 2	22	3	1	0	—		23	3
Paris Saint-Germain	1970–71	Division 2	32	8	3	1	—		35	9
Paris Saint-Germain	1971–72	Division 1	37	6	1	0	—		38	6
Paris Saint-Germain	Total		69	14	4	1	—		73	15
Paris FC	1972–73	Division 1	20	6	3	0	—		23	6
Paris FC	1973–74	Division 1	34	2	1	1	—		35	3
Paris FC	Total		54	8	4	1	—		58	9
Monaco	1974–75	Division 1	38	2	1	0	2 (Note: Appearances in the European Cup Winners' Cup)	0	41	2
Monaco	1975–76	Division 1	31	1	1	0	—		32	1
Monaco	1976–77	Division 2	25	1	2	1	—		27	2
Monaco	Total		94	4	4	1	2	0	100	5
Paris FC	1977–78	Division 2	25	2	3	0	—		28	2
Paris FC	1978–79	Division 1	2	0	0	0	—		2	0
Paris FC	1979–80	Division 2	8	0	0	0	—		8	0
Paris FC	Total		35	2	3	0	—		38	2
Career total			274	31	16	2	2	0	292	33

== Honours ==
=== Player ===
Paris Saint-Germain

- Division 2: 1970–71

Individual

- Division 2 Player of the Year: 1970
