= Jean-Claude Bras =

French footballer (born 1945)

Personal information
- Date of birth: 15 November 1945 (age 80)
- Place of birth: Paris, France
- Height: 1.72 m (5 ft 8 in)
- Positions: Striker; right winger

Youth career
- 1957–1958: Les Hongrois de Paris
- 1958–1964: Sports et Loisirs Vert et Blancs
- 1964–1965: Red Star

Senior career*
Years	Team	Apps	(Gls)
1965–1966	Red Star	22	(4)
1966–1969	Valenciennes	92	(21)
1969–1970	RFC Liège		
1970–1972	Paris Saint-Germain	56	(21)
1972–1973	Paris FC	21	(4)
1973–1978	Red Star	127	(19)
Total		318+	(69+)

International career
1969–1970	France	6	(2)
- * Club domestic league appearances and goals

Jean-Claude Bras (born 15 November 1945) is a French former professional footballer who played as a striker and right winger. After his footballing career, he acted as the president of Red Star for 23 years.

== After football ==
In 1978, Bras retired from football. The same year, he became the president of his former club Red Star, a role in which he stayed in until 2001, 23 years later. In his lifetime, he would also become an entrepreneur for a building business, and later, an international commerce company.

== Honours ==
Paris Saint-Germain

- Division 2: 1970–71
