= 1968–69 Coupe de France =

Tournament details
- Country: France

The Coupe de France's results of the 1968–69 season. Olympique de Marseille won the final played on May 18, 1969, beating Girondins de Bordeaux.

== Round of 16 ==
Team 1	Agg.	Team 2	1st leg	2nd leg	3rd leg
AS Angoulême (D2)	3–5	Olympique de Marseille (D1)	3–3	0–2	
Évreux AC (DH)	1–3	Stade Saint-Germain (CFA)	0–1	1–2	
Angers SCO (D2)	2–2	Olympique Lyonnais (D1)	1–0	1–2	
FC Gueugnon (CFA)	4–3	OGC Nice (D1)	2–3	2–0	
AS Saint-Étienne (D1)	2–3	Girondins de Bordeaux (D1)	0–1	2–2	
AC Cambrai (CFA)	1–2	FC Mulhouse (CFA)	0–1	1–1	
Red Star (D1)	4–6	RC Paris-Sedan (D1)	3–2	0–1	1–3
FC Metz (D1)	3–4	RC Strasbourg (D1)	2–0	1–4	

== Quarter-finals ==
Team 1	Agg.	Team 2	1st leg	2nd leg	3rd leg
Stade Saint-Germain (CFA)	1–7	Olympique de Marseille (D1)	0–2	1–5	
FC Gueugnon (CFA)	1–3	Angers SCO (D2)	0–1	1–2	
FC Mulhouse (CFA)	0–3	Girondins de Bordeaux (D1)	0–2	0–1	
RC Strasbourg (D1)	3–4	RC Paris-Sedan (D1)	1–0	0–1	2–3

== Semi-finals ==
First round

26 April 1969

Angers SCO (2)	0–0	Olympique de Marseille (1)
	(Report)

26 April 1969

RC Paris-Sedan (1)	0–0	Girondins de Bordeaux (1)
	(Report)

Second round

4 May 1969

Olympique de Marseille (1)	2–1	Angers SCO (2)
Magnusson 11'; Bonnel 90'	(Report)	Deloffre 16'

3 May 1969

Girondins de Bordeaux (1)	4–3	RC Paris-Sedan (1)
Chorda 10' (pen.), 77'; Petyt 48'; Ruiter 69'	(Report)	Salem 28'; Dellamore 47'; Levavasseur 58'

== Final ==
18 May 1969

Marseille	2–0	Bordeaux
Papin 82' (o.g.); Yegba Maya 89'

Stade Olympique Yves-du-Manoir, Colombes
Attendance: 39,460
Referee: Roger Machin
