= Bernard Béréau =

French footballer (1940-2005)

Personal information
- Date of birth: 4 October 1940
- Place of birth: Arbonne, France
- Date of death: 2 January 2005 (aged 64)
- Place of death: Ciboure, France
- Height: 1.73 m (5 ft 8 in)
- Position: Defender

Youth career
- 1949: US Auteuil
- Courbevoie

Senior career*
Years	Team	Apps	(Gls)
1960–1961	RC Paris	0	(0)
1961–1964	CA Paris	40+ (Note: Statistics for the 1963–64 season are unknown.)	(7+)
1964–1970	Stade Saint-Germain		
1970–1974	Paris Saint-Germain	80	(10)
1974–1976	Entente BFN		
- * Club domestic league appearances and goals

Bernard Béréau (or Béreau; 4 October 1940 – 2 January 2005) was a French professional footballer who played as a defender.

== After football ==
After retiring, Béréau became a physiotherapist for a club in Saint-Jean-de-Luz.

== Honours ==
Paris Saint-Germain

- Division 2: 1970–71
