= Pierre Phelipon =

French footballer (born 1935)

Personal information
- Date of birth: 5 February 1935 (age 91)
- Place of birth: Paris, France
- Height: 1.75 m (5 ft 9 in)
- Position: Defender

Youth career
- 1946–1955: RC Paris

Senior career*
Years	Team	Apps	(Gls)
1955–1959	RC Paris	1	(0)
1957–1958	→ Stade Français (loan)	37	(2)
1958–1959	→ Grenoble (loan)	33	(0)
1959	CA Paris	1	(0)
1959–1966	Rouen	228	(5)
1966–1969	Angoulême	99	(2)
1969–1970	Stade Saint-Germain		
1970–1971	Paris Saint-Germain	4	(0)
1972–1973	Bordeaux B		
Total		403+	(9+)

Managerial career
- 1968–1969: Angoulême
- 1969–1970: Stade Saint-Germain
- 1970–1972: Paris Saint-Germain
- 1972–1974: Bordeaux
- 1974–1976: Cambrai
- 1976–1981: Tours
- 1982–1985: Reims
- 1987–1988: Reims
- 1991–1992: Reims
- * Club domestic league appearances and goals

Pierre Phelipon (born 5 February 1935) is a French former professional football player and manager. In his playing days, he was a defender. He is known for being the first manager in the history of Paris Saint-Germain.

== Honours ==
Paris Saint-Germain

- Division 2: 1970–71
