= Camille Choquier =

French footballer (born 1941)

Personal information
- Date of birth: 25 September 1941 (age 85)
- Place of birth: Estrées-lès-Crécy, France
- Height: 1.85 m (6 ft 1 in)
- Position: Goalkeeper

Youth career
- 1955–1961: Abbeville

Senior career*
Years	Team	Apps	(Gls)
1961–1963	Épinal		
1963–1970	Stade Saint-Germain		
1970–1974	Paris Saint-Germain	82	(0)

Managerial career
- 1974–1979: Paris Saint-Germain (youth)
- 1979: Paris Saint-Germain (interim assistant)
- 1979–1985: Paris Saint-Germain B
- 1985–1987: Amiens
- 1988–1990: Melun-Dammarie
- 1990–1991: Poissy
- 1992–1993: Racing 92
- 1993–1994: Corbeil-Essonnes
- 1994–2001: Les Lilas
- 2003–2004: France police
- * Club domestic league appearances and goals

Camille Choquier (born 25 September 1941) is a French former professional football player and manager.

== Career ==
During his career as a player, he played for Abbeville, Épinal, Stade Saint-Germain, and its successor, Paris Saint-Germain. He coached Paris Saint-Germain, Amiens, Melun, Poissy, Racing 92, Corbeil-Essonnes, Les Lilas, and the France police national team.

During his manager years, Choquier would occasionally venture out into different roles. In 1985, he briefly became technical director at PSG. From 1987 to 1988, he worked as a scout for Mantes. From 2001 to 2003, he was coordinator of scouting for Paris Saint-Germain in the Île-de-France region.

== After football ==
In 2004, Choquier became a member of the Direction Technique Nationale. He would later become a member of the UNECATEF union. After this, he would work in youth football for the Ligue de Paris Île-de-France.

== Honours ==
=== Player ===
Paris Saint-Germain

- Division 2: 1970–71

=== Manager ===
Les Lilas

- Division d'Honneur Paris: 1994–95
- Championnat de France Amateur 2: 1997–98
