= Stade Saint-Germain =

Defunct football club in Saint-Germain-en-Laye, France

- Full name: Stade Saint-Germanois
- Founded: 21 June 1904; 122 years ago
- Dissolved: 12 August 1970; 56 years ago
- Ground: Stade Georges Lefèvre

Stade Saint-Germanois (French: Stade saint-germanois), often known as Stade Saint-Germain, was a French football club founded on 21 June 1904. On 12 August 1970, it merged with Paris FC to form Paris Saint-Germain FC. It was based in the commune of Saint-Germain-en-Laye in the western suburbs of Paris. The club's badge was the town's coat of arms, with the cot, the fleur-de-lis and the date making reference to the commune being the birthplace of King Louis XIV.

Before merging with Paris FC, Stade Saint-Germain's best performance in the Coupe de France was in the 1968–69 season, when the team reached the quarter-finals of the competition before losing to Olympique de Marseille.

== Notable former players ==
- (France) Camille Choquier
- (France) Bernard Guignedoux
- (France) Roger Quenolle
- (France) Michel Prost
- (France) Jean-Louis Brost
- (France) Bernard Béréau
- (Cameroon) Zacharie Noah
- (France) Pierre Phelipon
