= 1970–71 French Division 2 =

32nd season of the second-tier football league in France

Division 2
- Season: 1970–71
- Champions: Paris Saint-Germain
- Promoted: Paris Saint-Germain; AS Monaco; Lille
- Relegated: Grenoble; Alès; Havre; Strasbourg Reserves; Sochaux Reserves; Merlebach

The 1970–71 French Division 2 season was the 30th season since its establishment. It was constituted by three geographic groups (North, Center and South) with 16 clubs each. The winners of each group won promotion to the 1971–72 French Division 1. Additionally, the winners met once in the championship play–offs. The club with most points was crowned champion and awarded the trophy.

On the other hand, the bottom club of each group and the worst 15th placed club were relegated to the 1971–72 French Division 3. Meanwhile, all reserves teams were relegated at the end of the season, regardless of their final position, due to the creation of the Division 3, which would also serve as the top league for amateur clubs and the club's reserves sides.

The season began on 23 August 1970 and ended on 12 June 1971. The winter break was in effect from 27 December 1970 to 10 January 1971. Two points were awarded for a win, with no points for a loss. If the match was drawn, each team received one point.

== League tables ==
=== Group North ===
| Pos | Team | Pld | W | D | L | GF | GA | GD | Pts | Promotion or relegation |
|---|---|---|---|---|---|---|---|---|---|---|
| 1 | Lille (P, Q) | 30 | 19 | 6 | 5 | 56 | 25 | +31 | 44 | 1971–72 French Division 1 Championship play-offs |
| 2 | Chaumont | 30 | 17 | 8 | 5 | 42 | 19 | +23 | 42 | |
| 3 | Lens | 30 | 18 | 5 | 7 | 52 | 34 | +18 | 41 | |
| 4 | Boulogne | 30 | 15 | 9 | 6 | 54 | 40 | +14 | 39 | |
| 5 | Entente BFN | 30 | 9 | 14 | 7 | 43 | 31 | +12 | 32 | |
| 6 | Dunkerque | 30 | 11 | 10 | 9 | 42 | 36 | +6 | 32 | |
| 7 | Strasbourg Reserves (R) | 30 | 12 | 7 | 11 | 43 | 45 | −2 | 31 | 1971–72 French Division 3 |
| 8 | Mulhouse | 30 | 9 | 11 | 10 | 32 | 37 | −5 | 29 | |
| 9 | Besançon | 30 | 9 | 10 | 11 | 40 | 41 | −1 | 28 | |
| 10 | Amiens | 30 | 9 | 10 | 11 | 39 | 50 | −11 | 28 | |
| 11 | Troyes | 30 | 8 | 11 | 11 | 31 | 33 | −2 | 27 | |
| 12 | RC Joinville | 30 | 9 | 9 | 12 | 36 | 51 | −15 | 27 | |
| 13 | Sochaux Reserves (R) | 30 | 8 | 7 | 15 | 33 | 48 | −15 | 23 | 1971–72 French Division 3 |
| 14 | Cambrai | 30 | 6 | 10 | 14 | 44 | 52 | −8 | 22 | |
| 15 | AS Creil | 30 | 8 | 5 | 17 | 32 | 47 | −15 | 21 | |
| 16 | Merlebach (R) | 30 | 2 | 10 | 18 | 27 | 57 | −30 | 14 | 1971–72 French Division 3 |

Rules for classification: 1) points; 2) goal difference; 3) number of goals scored.
(P) Promoted; (Q) Qualified for the phase indicated; (R) Relegated

=== Group Center ===
| Pos | Team | Pld | W | D | L | GF | GA | GD | Pts | Promotion or relegation |
|---|---|---|---|---|---|---|---|---|---|---|
| 1 | Paris Saint-Germain (P, Q) | 30 | 17 | 11 | 2 | 52 | 23 | +29 | 45 | 1971–72 French Division 1 Championship play-offs |
| 2 | Rouen | 30 | 16 | 9 | 5 | 53 | 25 | +28 | 41 | |
| 3 | Limoges | 30 | 13 | 10 | 7 | 50 | 35 | +15 | 36 | |
| 4 | Montluçon | 30 | 13 | 9 | 8 | 56 | 39 | +17 | 35 | |
| 5 | Brest | 30 | 11 | 13 | 6 | 49 | 39 | +10 | 35 | |
| 6 | Lorient | 30 | 13 | 8 | 9 | 44 | 31 | +13 | 34 | |
| 7 | Quevilly | 30 | 11 | 12 | 7 | 44 | 36 | +8 | 34 | |
| 8 | Blois | 30 | 13 | 8 | 9 | 33 | 35 | −2 | 34 | |
| 9 | Le Mans | 30 | 9 | 11 | 10 | 36 | 40 | −4 | 29 | |
| 10 | Châteauroux | 30 | 6 | 12 | 12 | 32 | 40 | −8 | 24 | |
| 11 | Quimper | 30 | 7 | 10 | 13 | 24 | 45 | −21 | 24 | |
| 12 | Bourges | 30 | 7 | 9 | 14 | 28 | 46 | −18 | 23 | |
| 13 | Laval | 30 | 7 | 9 | 14 | 30 | 49 | −19 | 23 | |
| 14 | Caen | 30 | 8 | 6 | 16 | 29 | 46 | −17 | 22 | |
| 15 | Poitiers | 30 | 4 | 14 | 12 | 25 | 44 | −19 | 22 | |
| 16 | Le Havre (R) | 30 | 6 | 7 | 17 | 37 | 49 | −12 | 19 | 1971–72 French Division 3 |

Source: Histoire du PSG
Rules for classification: 1) points; 2) goal difference; 3) number of goals scored.
(P) Promoted; (Q) Qualified for the phase indicated; (R) Relegated

=== Group South ===
| Pos | Team | Pld | W | D | L | GF | GA | GD | Pts | Promotion or relegation |
|---|---|---|---|---|---|---|---|---|---|---|
| 1 | Monaco (P, Q) | 30 | 22 | 3 | 5 | 71 | 23 | +48 | 47 | 1971–72 French Division 1 Championship play-offs |
| 2 | Avignon | 30 | 17 | 6 | 7 | 53 | 25 | +28 | 40 | |
| 3 | Aix | 30 | 17 | 4 | 9 | 50 | 32 | +18 | 38 | |
| 4 | Cannes | 30 | 14 | 10 | 6 | 43 | 28 | +15 | 38 | |
| 5 | Toulon | 30 | 13 | 5 | 12 | 37 | 37 | 0 | 31 | |
| 6 | Toulouse | 30 | 12 | 6 | 12 | 37 | 33 | +4 | 30 | |
| 7 | Gueugnon | 30 | 12 | 6 | 12 | 40 | 45 | −5 | 30 | |
| 8 | Gazélec Ajaccio | 30 | 9 | 10 | 11 | 26 | 26 | 0 | 28 | |
| 9 | Sète | 30 | 11 | 6 | 13 | 34 | 43 | −9 | 28 | |
| 10 | Montpellier | 30 | 11 | 6 | 13 | 33 | 44 | −11 | 28 | |
| 11 | La Ciotat | 30 | 9 | 9 | 12 | 35 | 45 | −10 | 27 | |
| 12 | UMS Montélimar | 30 | 10 | 7 | 13 | 31 | 43 | −12 | 27 | |
| 13 | Arles-Avignon | 30 | 9 | 8 | 13 | 33 | 38 | −5 | 26 | |
| 14 | Béziers Hérault | 30 | 10 | 6 | 14 | 34 | 44 | −10 | 26 | |
| 15 | Grenoble (R) | 30 | 7 | 6 | 17 | 25 | 45 | −20 | 20 | 1971–72 French Division 3 |
| 16 | Alès (R) | 30 | 5 | 6 | 19 | 29 | 60 | −31 | 16 | 1971–72 French Division 3 |

Rules for classification: 1) points; 2) goal difference; 3) number of goals scored.
(P) Promoted; (Q) Qualified for the phase indicated; (R) Relegated

== Championship play-offs ==
=== Table ===
| Pos | Team | Pld | W | D | L | GF | GA | GD | Pts |
|---|---|---|---|---|---|---|---|---|---|
| 1 | Paris Saint-Germain (C) | 2 | 1 | 1 | 0 | 6 | 4 | +2 | 3 |
| 2 | Monaco | 2 | 0 | 2 | 0 | 4 | 4 | 0 | 2 |
| 3 | Lille | 2 | 0 | 1 | 1 | 4 | 6 | −2 | 1 |

Source: Histoire du PSG
Rules for classification: 1) points; 2) goal difference; 3) number of goals scored.
(C) Champions

=== Matches ===
28 May 1971

| Lille | 2–2 | AS Monaco |
|---|---|---|
| Deferrez 25'; Loup 44' | | Petit 32'; Dell'Oste 46' |

Stade Henri-Jooris, Lille
Attendance: 6,000
Referee: Roger Machin

6 June 1971

| AS Monaco | 2–2 | Paris Saint-Germain |
|---|---|---|
| Floch 9'; Dell'Oste 24' | Report | Piana 13' (o.g.); Bras 54' |

Stade Louis II, Monaco
Attendance: 1,905
Referee: Gaston Eyroulet

12 June 1971

| Paris Saint-Germain | 4–2 | Lille |
|---|---|---|
| Béreau 1'; Rémond 20'; Guignedoux 68'; Prost 80' | Report | Bajić 52'; Dubaële 88' |

Stade Georges Lefèvre, Saint-Germain-en-Laye
Attendance: 4,755
Referee: André Petit
