= List of Paris Saint-Germain FC presidents =

Paris Saint-Germain FC have had 17 presidents, ten of whom have won at least one trophy. Qatari businessman and chairman of Qatar Sports Investments, Nasser Al-Khelaifi, is the current president. Appointed on 4 November 2011, he is the club's longest-serving president, having held the position for over 14 years. Pierre-Étienne Guyot, elected in June 1970, was the club's first president. His tenure was brief, but during his single season in charge, PSG won their first trophy, the Ligue 2 title.

Fashion designer Daniel Hechter took over as president of the club in June 1974. He designed PSG's iconic home shirt, known as the "Hechter shirt." Francis Borelli succeeded Hechter in 1978 after the latter had been banned from football for life by the French Football Federation. Hechter was found guilty of operating a ticket-selling scheme at the Parc des Princes. During his 13 years as president, PSG won their first major titles: two French Cups in 1982 and 1983, and the Ligue 1 title in 1986.

Michel Denisot, the club's iconic president of the 1990s, succeeded Borelli. Between 1991 and 1998, PSG won eight trophies, including their second league title in 1994 and their first European trophy, the UEFA Cup Winners' Cup in 1996. Denisot has since been overshadowed by Nasser Al-Khelaifi, the club's most successful president, with 43 trophies won. Under his leadership, the Parisians have won twelve Ligue 1 titles, eight Coupe de France, six Coupe de la Ligue, twelve Trophée des Champions, two UEFA Champions League, two UEFA Super Cup, and one FIFA Intercontinental Cup.

== Presidents ==
As of November 2011.

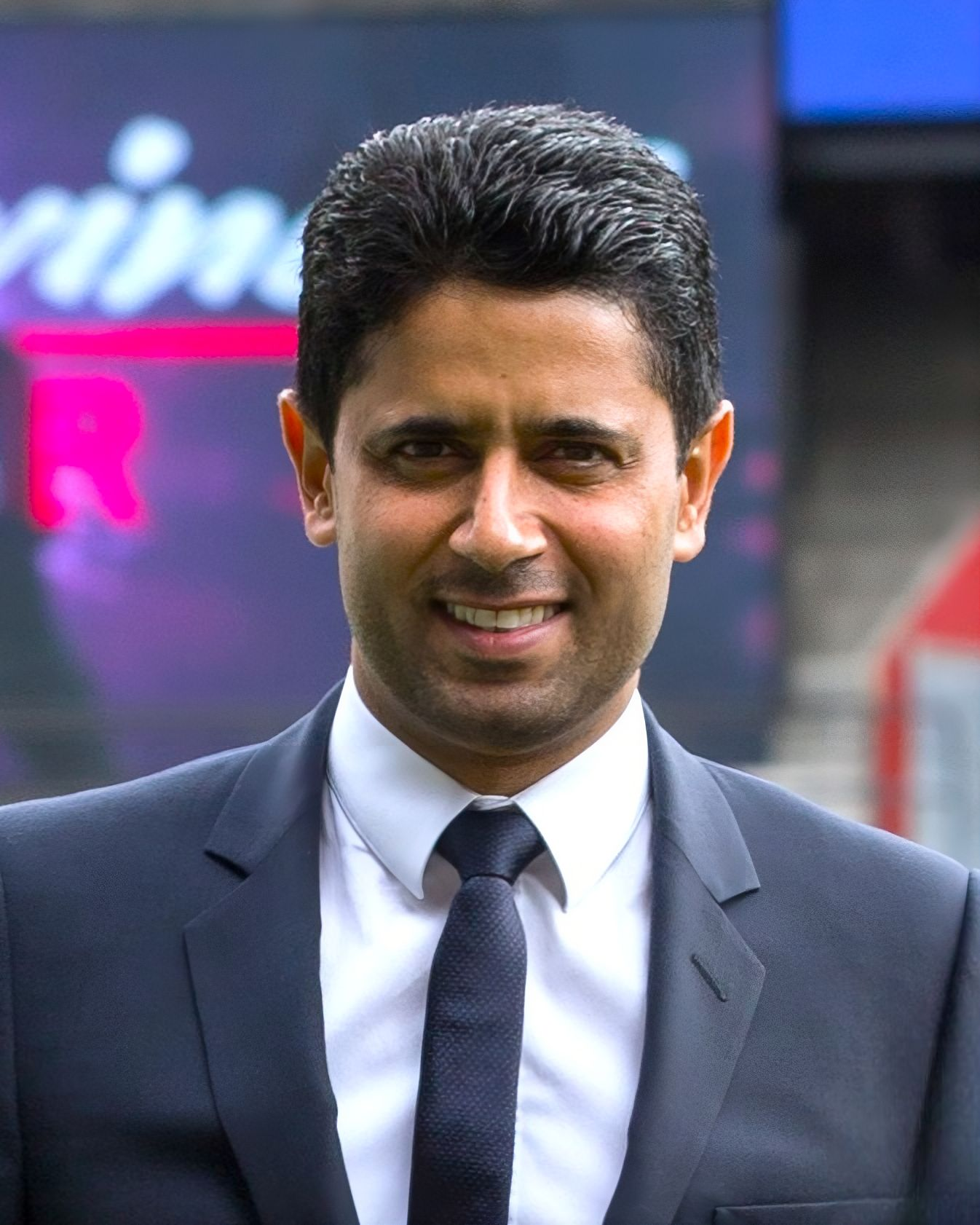
Nasser Al-Khelaifi

No.	President	Tenure
1	(France) Pierre-Étienne Guyot	Jun. 1970 – Jun. 1971
2	(France) Guy Crescent	Jun. 1971 – Dec. 1971
3	(France) Henri Patrelle	Dec. 1971 – Jun. 1974
4	(France) Daniel Hechter	Jun. 1974 – Jan. 1978
5	(France) Francis Borelli	Jan. 1978 – May 1991
6	(France) Michel Denisot	May 1991 – May 1998
7	(France) Charles Biétry	May 1998 – Dec. 1998
8	(France) Laurent Perpère	Dec. 1998 – Jun. 2003
9	(France) Francis Graille	Jun. 2003 – May 2005
10	(France) Pierre Blayau	May 2005 – Jun. 2006
11	(France) Alain Cayzac	Jun. 2006 – Apr. 2008
12	(France) Simon Tahar	Apr. 2008 – May 2008
13	(France) Charles Villeneuve	May 2008 – Feb. 2009
14	(France) Sébastien Bazin	Feb. 2009 – Sep. 2009
15	(France) Robin Leproux	Sep. 2009 – Jul. 2011
16	(France) Benoît Rousseau	Jul. 2011 – Nov. 2011
17	(Qatar) Nasser Al-Khelaifi	Nov. 2011 – Present

== Trophies ==
As of 2026 UEFA Super Cup.

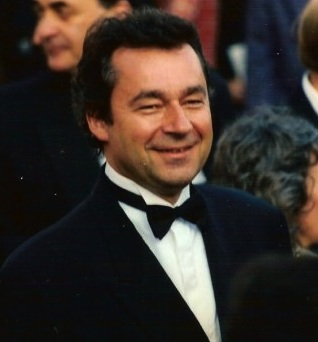
Michel Denisot

Rank	President	L1	L2	CdF	CdL	TdC	UCL	UCWC	UEL	USC	UIC	FCWC	FIC	Total
1	(Qatar) Nasser Al-Khelaifi	12		8	6	12	2			2			1	43
2	(France) Michel Denisot	1		3	2	1		1						8
3	(France) Francis Borelli	1		2										3
4	(France) Francis Graille			1										1
5	(France) Pierre Blayau			1										1
6	(France) Robin Leproux			1										1
7	(France) Alain Cayzac				1									1
8	(France) Charles Biétry					1								1
9	(France) Laurent Perpère										1			1
10	(France) Pierre-Étienne Guyot		1											1
