= Paris Saint-Germain FC ownership and finances =

Overview of the ownership and finances of Paris Saint-Germain Football Club

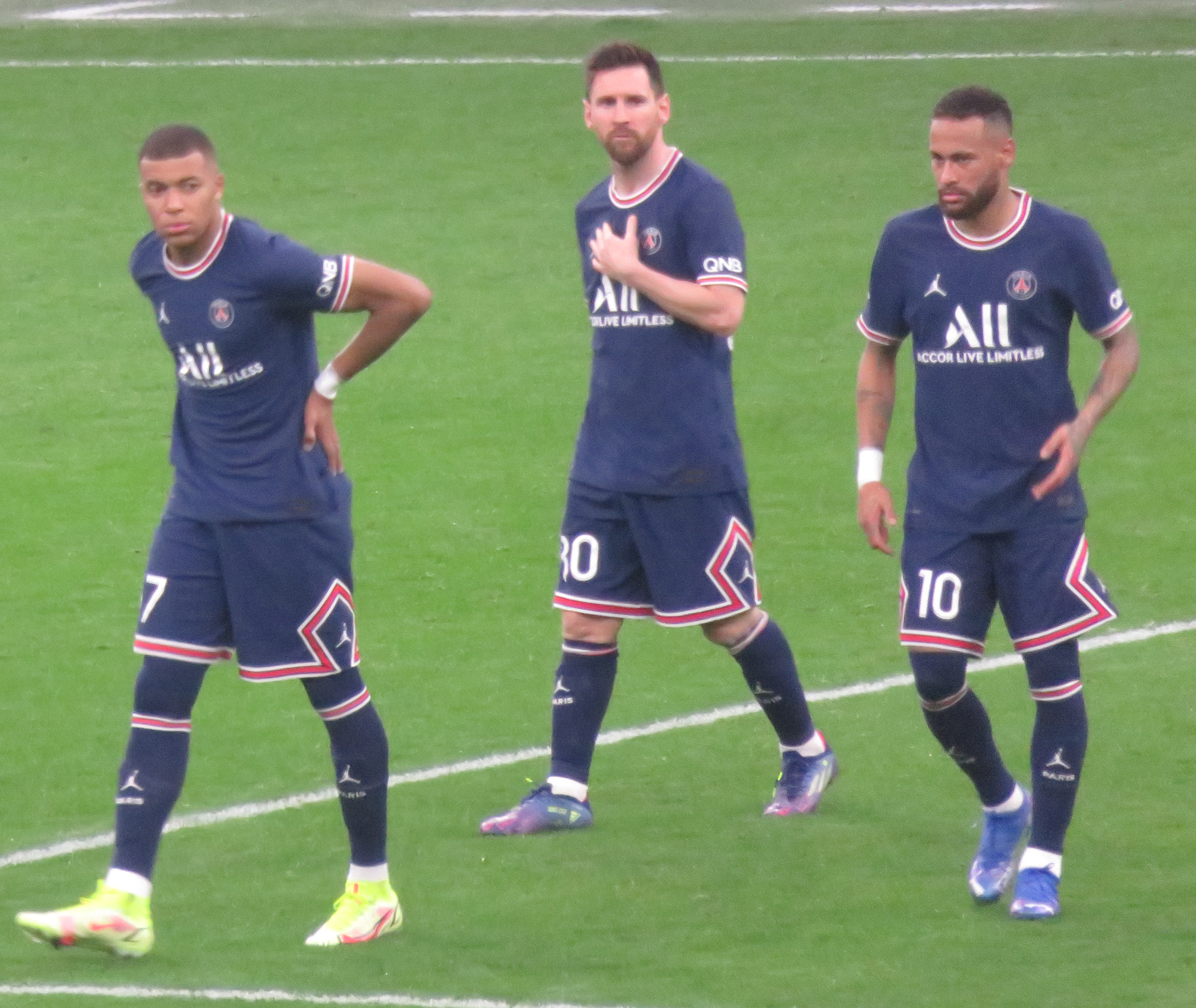
PSG's Neymar, Kylian Mbappé and Lionel Messi in 2021.

Paris Saint-Germain FC were initially fan-owned, with around 20,000 members under a non-profit association governed by 1901 French law (Association PSG). The club was led by board members Guy Crescent, Pierre-Étienne Guyot and Henri Patrelle. In 1973, a group of French businessmen led by Daniel Hechter and Francis Borelli took control of the club. PSG changed ownership in 1991 when Canal+ created a professional sports company (SASP) structure, followed by another takeover in 2006 by Colyzeo, an investment fund sponsored by Colony Capital and Eurazeo. Since 2011, Qatar Sports Investments (QSI) have been the majority owners, currently holding 85.9% of shares, with Arctos Partners (12.5%) and Boardroom (1.6%) holding the remainder.

Backed by the Qatari state, QSI acquired a controlling stake in 2011 and became sole owner in 2012. Since then, PSG have been widely described as a state-backed club and among the wealthiest in world football. QSI chairman Nasser Al-Khelaifi has served as PSG president since the takeover. However, the Emir of Qatar, Tamim bin Hamad Al Thani, as head of the Qatar Investment Authority (QIA) and founder of QSI, is widely regarded as the ultimate decision-maker on major strategic matters. Upon arrival, QSI pledged to build a squad capable of winning the UEFA Champions League. Since 2011, PSG have invested heavily in transfer fees and wages. This spending has led to domestic dominance and two consecutive Champions League titles, but also scrutiny under UEFA Financial Fair Play Regulations.

As of May 2026, PSG ranked fourth globally in football revenue with €837 million according to Deloitte, and were valued at around €5 billion by Forbes, making them the fifth-most valuable club in the world. This growth has been driven by sustained investment, sporting success, global branding, and commercial partnerships. Deloitte also ranked PSG's women's team among the top revenue-generating sides in world women's football, while the club's handball section operates with one of the largest budgets in European handball.

== History ==
=== From Hechter to Borelli ===
The development of football in Paris was considered a major objective in the late 1960s, as the French capital lacked an elite football club. In January 1969, the French Football Federation (FFF) announced a project to create a major new club in Paris and established a study committee. The initiative was led by Fernand Sastre, general secretary and future president of the FFF, Henri Patrelle, president of Stade Saint-Germain, and Guy Crescent, businessman and CEO of Calberson. Following a large consultation across the Paris region, the Paris FC project was officially launched in the summer of 1969 under the co-presidency of Guy Crescent and Pierre-Étienne Guyot. However, the project faced financial difficulties, prompting Crescent and Guyot to seek external advice from Real Madrid president Santiago Bernabéu, who recommended launching a subscription campaign. As a result, 17,400 subscriptions were secured by February 1970. The club was therefore initially fan-owned, with annual membership fees ranging between 25 and 40 francs.

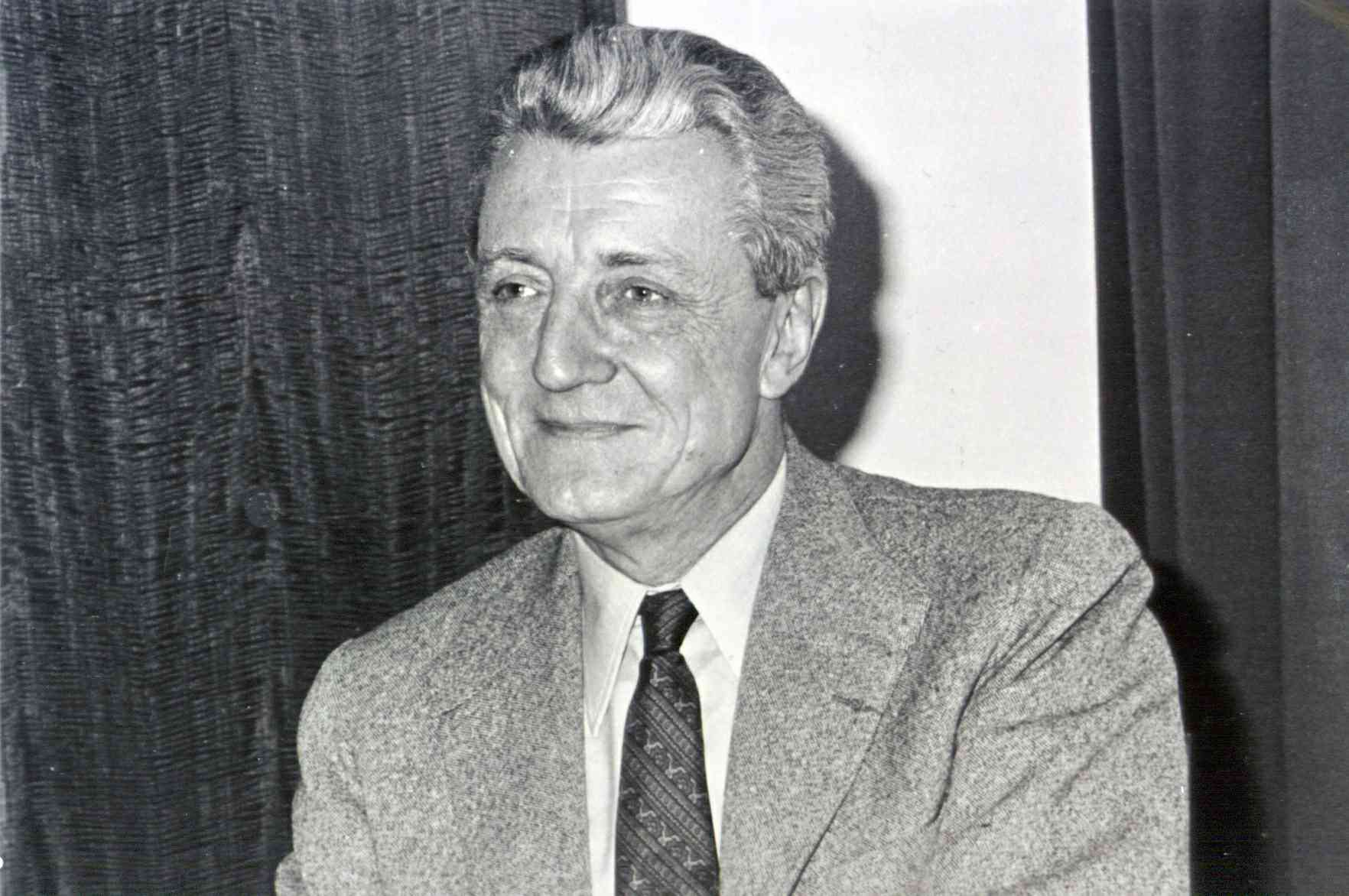
Guy Crescent, co-founder of PSG.

Despite this initial success, Paris FC remained a virtual entity, lacking a stadium, players, and a coach. In spring 1970, the club failed to secure a merger with any regional team, while the FFF declined to grant direct entry into the top division. Facing the risk of reimbursing subscribers, a merger with Stade Saint-Germain became the preferred solution. In May 1970, the FFF and the clubs involved approved the proposal. Paris Saint-Germain was subsequently founded on 12 August 1970 following the merger process. It became the first club in French football history to be created with financial contributions from supporters through a subscription campaign.

PSG was managed by Crescent, Guyot and Patrelle until 1972, when it split from Paris FC following internal disagreements and structural changes. In 1973, after a season marked by significant debt and the loss of most of its subscribers, Patrelle sought new financial backing. He obtained support from French fashion designer and investor Daniel Hechter and his associates. They subsequently took control of the club, with Hechter appointed president and Francis Borelli as vice-president. Borelli later became president in 1978, following Hechter's lifetime ban from football imposed by the FFF in connection with a ticketing scandal at the Parc des Princes.

PSG's first major trophies were won during Borelli's presidency. The club benefited from relatively stable management and regular qualification for European competitions, which contributed to improved financial conditions. The competitive landscape in Paris changed in 1984 with the rise of Racing CFF, rebranded as Matra Racing and supported by the Matra conglomerate. The club briefly emerged as a rival to PSG for status as the capital's leading team. However, the project proved short-lived, and by 1989 Matra Racing had returned to the lower divisions following financial collapse. During this period, Borelli accumulated significant debt in an effort to maintain PSG's position in Paris. Financial irregularities in his management were later exposed in 1991, by which time the club had already accrued substantial liabilities and faced the risk of insolvency. He ultimately resigned under pressure from the Council of Paris.

=== Canal+ and Colony Capital ===
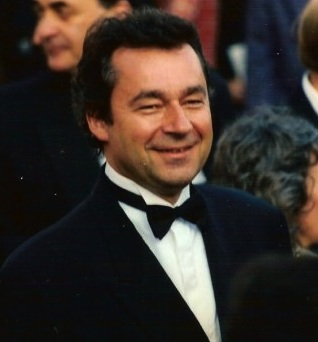
Michel Denisot, PSG president from 1991 to 1998.

Eager to revive interest in Ligue 1 and attract more subscribers, French media company Canal+ invested in PSG in May 1991. Canal+ paid off the club's debts and saved it from bankruptcy. Until June 1991, the Association Paris Saint-Germain Football Club (Association loi 1901), a non-profit organization, had managed the club's amateur and professional activities for two decades. When Canal+ took control of PSG in May 1991, it created the Société Anonyme Sportive Professionnelle Paris Saint-Germain Football (SASP, i.e., a professional sports private limited company) shortly afterwards, initially holding 39.8% of the shares. The association transferred the professional section to the SASP.

The takeover revitalized PSG. Backed by its shareholders, rising attendance at the Parc des Princes, and increasing domestic and European television revenues driven by improved sporting performances, PSG became one of the richest clubs in France and in Europe. The club's budget rose to 120 million francs, and high-profile signings such as Valdo, David Ginola, George Weah, Raí and Youri Djorkaeff helped secure several trophies between 1993 and 1998. The club was managed by several delegated presidents during this period; Michel Denisot was the first and by far the most successful.

After the creation of the SASP, the Association Paris Saint-Germain retained 51% of the shares. Canal+ became the majority shareholder in 1997 (56.8%) following the transfer of 17% of shares from the PSG Association (reduced to 34%). The association withdrew in 2001 in favor of Canal+, which reinvested tens of millions of euros in the club and increased its stake to 90.8%. Canal+ became sole owner in 2005 after buying out historical shareholders Charles Talar (4.5%) and Bernard Brochand (2.9%) in 2004, and Alain Cayzac (1.8%) in 2005.

Between 1991 and 1998, PSG president Michel Denisot ensured the club's financial stability, supported by sporting success and rising broadcasting revenues. His departure at the end of the 1997–98 season marked a turning point, after which PSG struggled on the pitch and began to accumulate debt off it. Despite recapitalization in 2004, financial losses continued to rise, and between 2004 and 2006 PSG remained the only major French club with significant losses, despite an increase of the turnover. Led by players such as Marco Simone, Ronaldinho and Pauleta, the club won four trophies after the departure of Michel Denisot between 1998 and 2006, but performances gradually declined.

A separation from Canal+ eventually became inevitable. In April 2006, Canal+ sold the club to investment firms Colony Capital, Butler Capital Partners and Morgan Stanley for €41 million, forming a consortium with equal ownership. But the negative spiral continues and PSG spent two seasons narrowly avoiding relegation. Colony Capital gradually increased its stake between 2008 and 2009 to 98.42%, while Butler retained 1.58%. After significantly reducing losses and won 2 trophies despite poor sporting performances in the league and numerous scandals with supporters, Colony Capital announced in 2010 that it was seeking new investors to help transform PSG into a title contender in the coming years.

=== Qatar Sports Investments ===
==== QSI takeover and club transformation ====
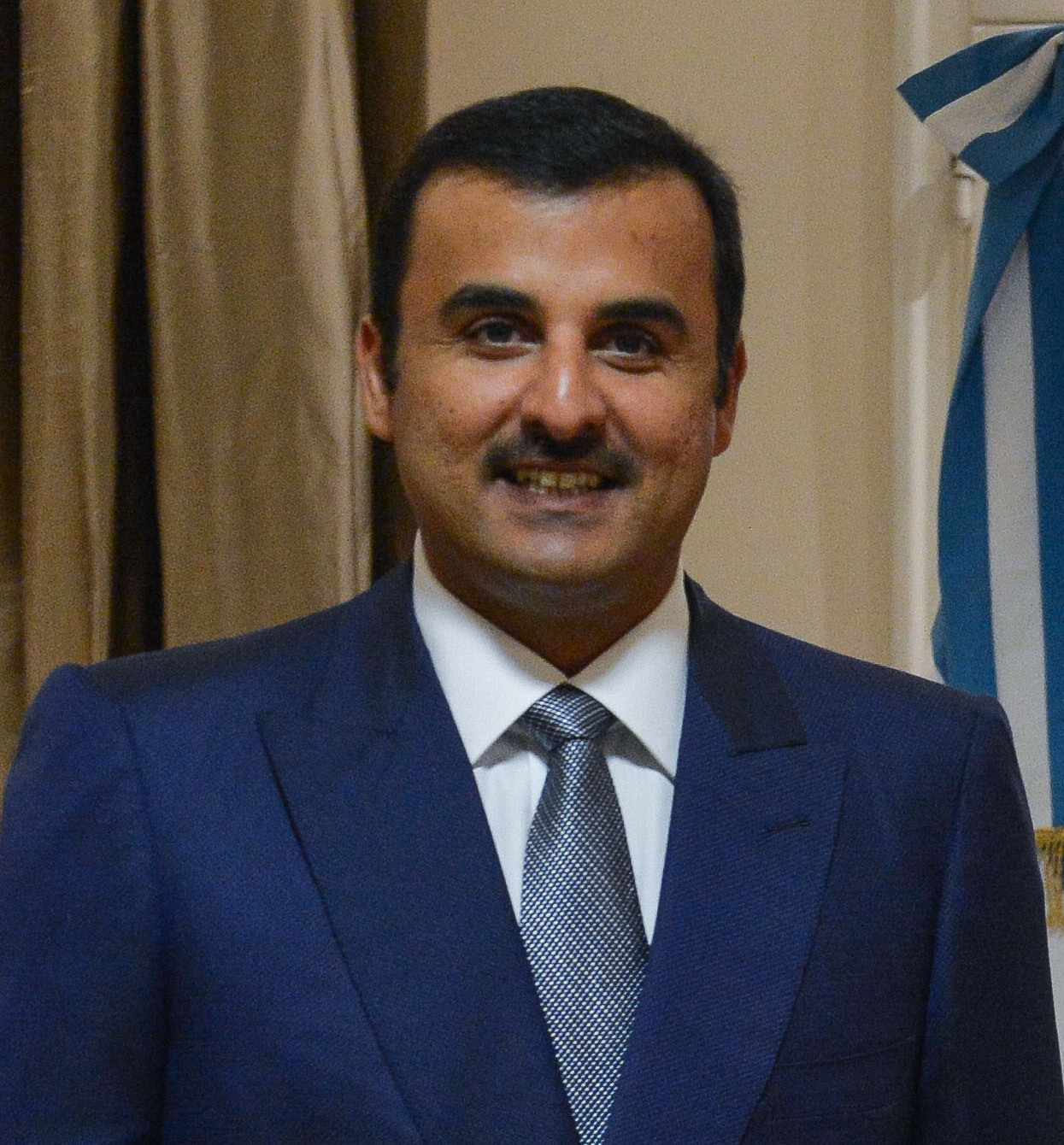
Tamim bin Hamad Al Thani, Emir of Qatar and key PSG figure.

Paris Saint-Germain were transformed in June 2011 when Qatar Sports Investments (QSI), a state-backed investment fund linked to the Qatar Investment Authority (QIA), acquired a 70% stake in the club. Colony Capital (29%) and Butler Capital Partners (1%) initially remained minority shareholders. QSI chairman Nasser Al-Khelaifi was appointed club president following the takeover, on behalf of Tamim bin Hamad Al Thani, the Emir of Qatar. Al Thani is also the founder and chairman of the QIA, QSI's parent organization. QSI subsequently acquired full ownership in March 2012, valuing the club at approximately €100 million. Through QSI and other state-linked entities, including Qatar Tourism Authority (QTA), QNB Group (QNB) and Ooredoo, PSG has been described as a state-supported club among the wealthiest in world football.

The strategy behind Qatar's acquisition of PSG has been linked to efforts to project a global sporting image ahead of the 2022 FIFA World Cup. In November 2010, shortly before the vote, UEFA president Michel Platini met with the Emir of Qatar, the Qatari prime minister, and French president Nicolas Sarkozy, a known supporter of PSG, at a time when the club was struggling financially under Colony Capital. Following this meeting, Platini reportedly changed his voting intention from the United States to Qatar, and six months later QSI acquired PSG.

Since the takeover, PSG have developed from Ligue 1 strugglers into one of Europe's leading clubs and regular UEFA Champions League contenders, driven by significant investment in player recruitment. The club has dominated French football during this period and has won back-to-back UEFA Champions League titles in 2025 and 2026. PSG's spending has also resulted in scrutiny under UEFA Financial Fair Play Regulations (FFP).

In August 2012, PSG signed a major nation branding agreement with the QTA to promote Qatar internationally. The agreement was reported to be worth up to €1 billion over five seasons, including €100 million for the first season. The partnership was formally announced in October 2013, but the contract included retroactive payments of €100 million and €200 million for the 2011–12 and 2012–13 seasons, respectively, effectively offsetting reported losses during that period.

==== UEFA sanctions and new investors ====
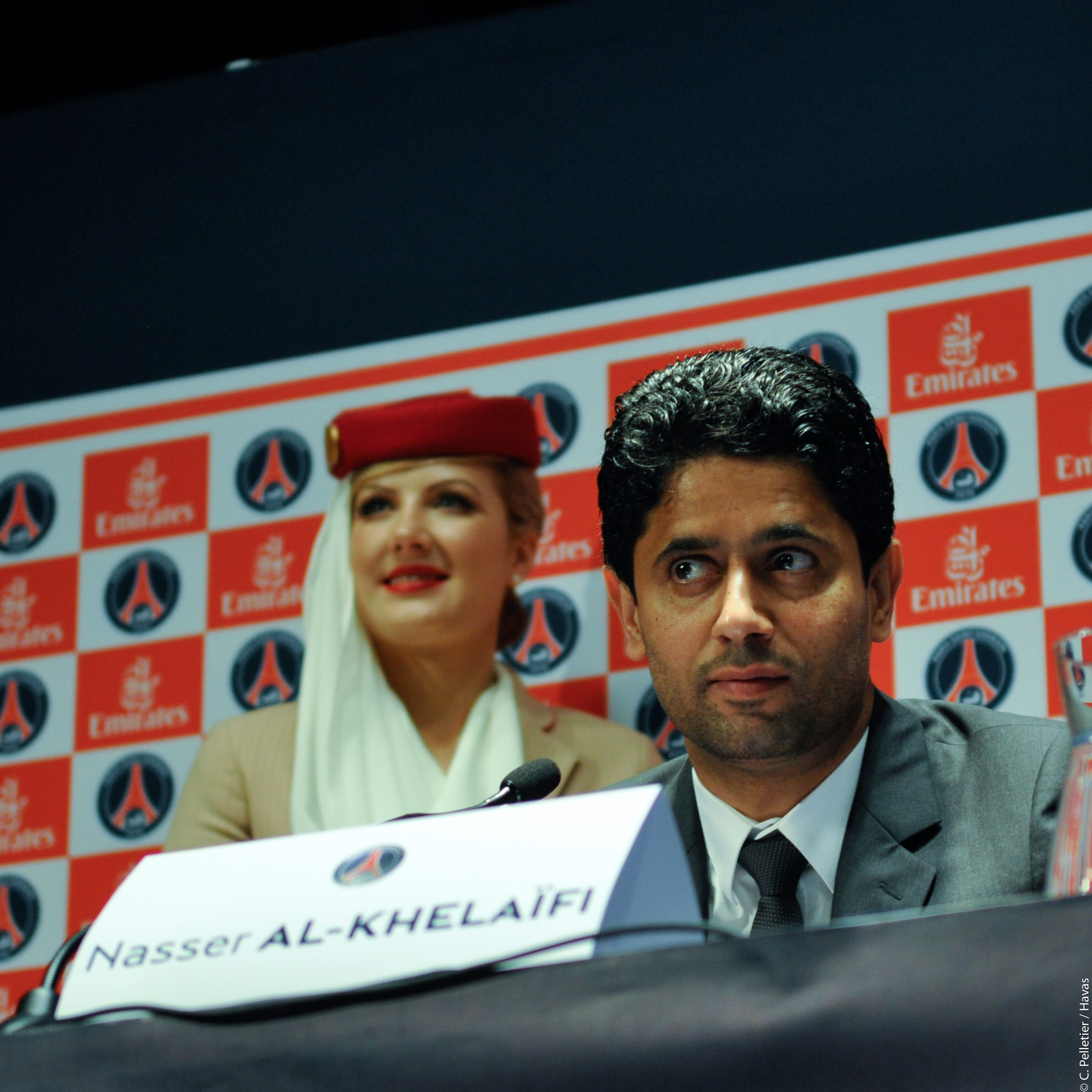
Nasser Al-Khelaifi, president of PSG since 2011.

In October 2013, UEFA's Club Financial Control Body (CFCB) concluded that the QTA agreement, valued at €200 million per year and partially backdated, was not in line with fair market value and reduced its assessed value to €100 million. As a result, UEFA ruled in April 2014 that PSG's financial deficit for the 2013–14 season exceeded Financial Fair Play limits, which at the time restricted aggregate losses to €45 million over a monitored period. UEFA's revised valuation saw PSG's deficit for the 2013–14 season reach €107m — more than double the amount allowed under FFP rules, which limit losses to €45m over the last two years. In May 2014, UEFA imposed sanctions on PSG, including a €60 million fine. In September 2015, the restrictions were lifted. In August 2016, PSG and QTA renewed their partnership until June 2019.

In August 2017, PSG activated the €222 million release clause of Barcelona player Neymar, making him the most expensive transfer in football history. Later that month, Kylian Mbappé joined PSG from Monaco for €180 million, structured in three installments. UEFA subsequently opened a new FFP investigation into PSG. In June 2018, UEFA cleared the club of breaching FFP rules but reduced the assessed value of its Qatar-based sponsorship deals from €100 million to €58 million. UEFA also stated that the QTA agreement would no longer be taken into account beyond June 2019. PSG met UEFA's requirement to generate €50 million in player sales before the end of June 2018.

PSG appealed to the Court of Arbitration for Sport (CAS) in November 2018. In March 2019, the CAS upheld PSG's appeal, allowing the club to avoid sanctions for the 2015–17 assessment period. The club also met the €60 million requirement in player sales before the end of June 2019. The club did not renew its long-term agreement with the QTA after its expiry in June 2019, instead moving towards more conventional commercial partnerships. These included deals with Accor (€65m/year), Nike (€80m/year), and Air Jordan (€67m/year), but also continued Qatar-linked sponsorship agreements, including Qatar Airways as shirt sponsor (€70m/year until 2028).

In December 2023, Arctos Partners acquired a 12.5% minority stake in PSG, valuing the club at around €4.25 billion, while QSI retained 87.5% control. Arctos reportedly invested around €530 million for its minority stake. Arctos focused on international growth and infrastructure projects, including the women's team and the Campus PSG training centre, while discussions continued over the future of the Parc des Princes. In June 2025, Boardroom, the company co-founded by Kevin Durant, acquired a 1.6% minority stake in PSG. The club stated that the partnership would support its multi-sport strategy, including future developments in basketball.

== Financial status ==
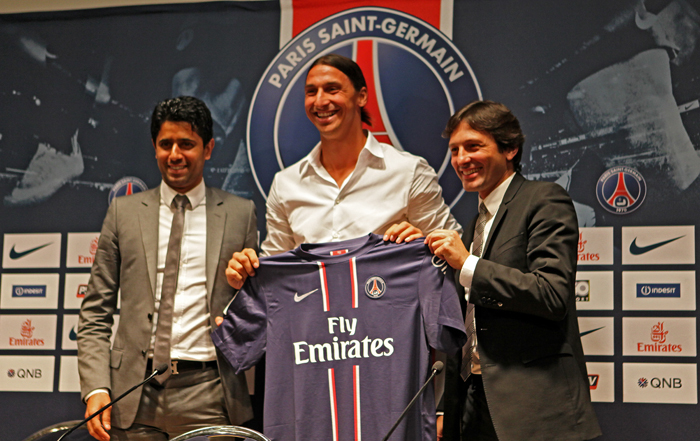
Zlatan Ibrahimović, the first star signing of the QSI era.

Paris Saint-Germain recorded a profit of 1.5 million francs in their inaugural 1970–71 season, but subsequently accumulated increasing debt. By the early 1990s, the club faced severe financial difficulties, with debts of around 50 million francs, which the Council of Paris refused to cover. Canal+ invested in the club in May 1991, clearing its debts and restructuring it as a professional sports public limited company (SASP), after which PSG became one of the richest clubs in France. Between 1991 and 1998, PSG benefited from rising television revenues, strong sporting performances and increased attendance at the Parc des Princes. The club opened its first official store in 1998 and entered the Deloitte Football Money League, before dropping out the following season amid sporting and financial decline.

PSG recorded negative net income between 1998 and 2011, with cumulative losses of nearly €300 million under Canal+ and Colony Capital ownership. At the time, the club generated €101 million in revenue by season and was valued at €100 million. In June 2011, Tamim bin Hamad Al Thani, Emir of Qatar, acquired PSG through Qatar Sports Investments (QSI), which covered €15–20 million in debt and €19 million in losses from the 2010–11 season. Backed by the Qatari state, PSG became one of the wealthiest clubs in world football.

Ahead of the 2011–12 campaign, club president Nasser Al-Khelaifi announced plans to restore profitability, a feat not achieved since the tenure of Michel Denisot in the 1990s. The club returned to the Deloitte rankings that season. PSG posted profits in 2014–15, 2015–16, 2017–18 and 2018–19. Following the outbreak of the COVID-19 pandemic in March 2020, PSG suffered a major financial setback. Combined with high wage costs, the club recorded losses in each of the next five seasons, peaking at €368 million in 2021–22. After moving away from a star-driven wage structure, PSG's losses have sharply decreased since 2022, from €110 million in 2022–23 to €60 million in 2023–24 and €40 million in 2024–25.

As of May 2026, PSG ranked fourth globally in revenue (€837 million) according to Deloitte and fifth in club valuation (€5 billion) according to Forbes. Growth has been driven by sustained investment, sporting success, high-profile signings such as Zlatan Ibrahimović, Neymar, Kylian Mbappé and Lionel Messi, and commercial partnerships with the Qatar Tourism Authority (QTA), Nike, Air Jordan, Accor and Qatar Airways. PSG's women's team generated €4.6 million in revenue, while the handball section operated with one of the largest budgets in European handball.

== Sportswear partnerships ==
=== Shirt sponsor ===
Partnership history
Period	Shirt sponsor	Kit supplier
1970–1972	None	Le Coq Sportif
1972–1973	Montreal	Le Coq Sportif
1973–1974	Canada Dry	Le Coq Sportif
1974–1975	RTL	Le Coq Sportif
1975–1976	RTL	Kopa
1976–1977	RTL	Le Coq Sportif
1977–1978	RTL	Pony
1978–1986	RTL	Le Coq Sportif
1986–1988	RTL / Canal+	Adidas
1988–1989	RTL / La Cinq	Adidas
1989–1990	RTL / TDK	Nike (or Air Jordan)
1990–1991	RTL / Alain Afflelou	Nike (or Air Jordan)
1991–1992	Commodore / Müller	Nike (or Air Jordan)
1992–1993	Commodore / Tourtel	Nike (or Air Jordan)
1993–1994	Commodore / Tourtel / SEAT	Nike (or Air Jordan)
1994–1995	SEAT / Tourtel / Lipton	Nike (or Air Jordan)
1995–2002	Opel	Nike (or Air Jordan)
2002–2006	Thomson	Nike (or Air Jordan)
2006–2019	Emirates	Nike (or Air Jordan)
2019–2022	Accor	Nike (or Air Jordan)
2022–	Qatar Airways	Nike (or Air Jordan)

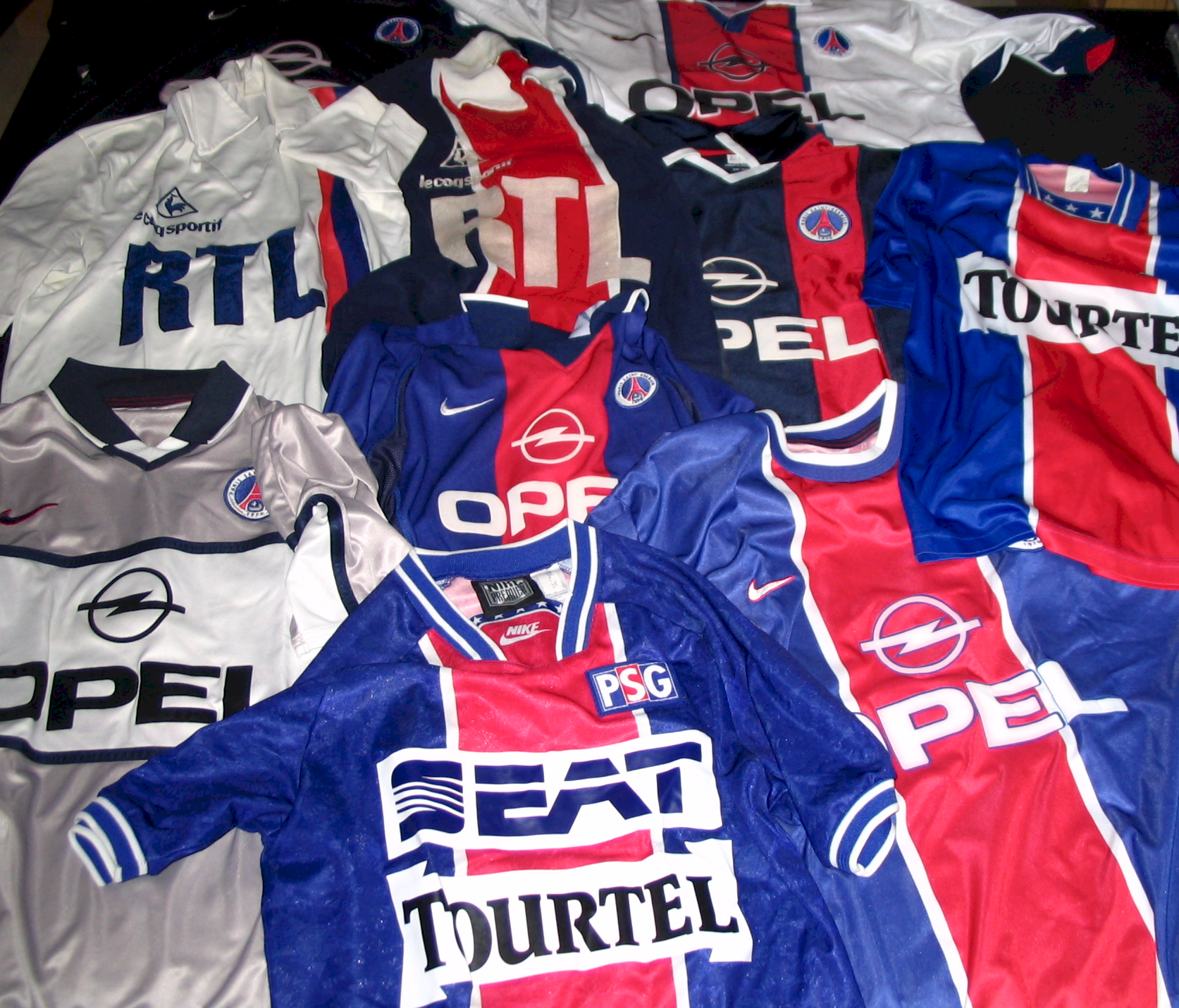
PSG shirts through the years.

Paris Saint-Germain played without a shirt sponsor until 1972, when the club signed a deal with Canadian grocery chain Montreal. PSG then signed with Canadian soft-drink brand Canada Dry for the 1973–74 season in what was the biggest sponsorship contract in Division 2 history at the time. The club also reached an agreement with French radio station RTL worth 1.2 million francs for the 1974–75 season, conditional on promotion to the top flight. PSG achieved promotion and the RTL partnership lasted until 1991.

Between 1986 and 1995, the club featured multiple shirt sponsors, including French media company Canal+, French television channel La Cinq, Japanese electronics company TDK, computer manufacturer Commodore, dairy company Müller, Spanish car manufacturer SEAT and British tea brand Lipton. German automobile manufacturer Opel became the sole shirt sponsor in 1995 and remained until 2002. It was succeeded by French multimedia company Thomson (2002–2006) and Dubai-based airline Emirates (2006–2019).

Following the end of the Emirates partnership, French hospitality company Accor became PSG's shirt sponsor in 2019. Its Accor Live Limitless (ALL) loyalty platform appeared on the front of the shirts until 2022. Accor reportedly paid around €65 million per year, compared to approximately €25 million under the Emirates deal. In June 2022, Qatari carrier Qatar Airways replaced Accor as shirt sponsor under a contract reportedly worth close to €70 million per season until 2028.

=== Kit supplier ===
French sportswear manufacturer Le Coq Sportif became Paris Saint-Germain's first kit supplier in 1970 and served in three separate spells: 1970–1975, 1976–77, and 1978–1986. French sportswear brand Kopa and American sportswear company Pony supplied the club's kits during the intervening 1975–76 and 1977–78 seasons, respectively. German sportswear manufacturer Adidas then served as PSG's kit supplier from 1986 to 1989.

Nike replaced Adidas ahead of the 1989–90 season and has remained the club's kit supplier ever since. The deal was renewed until the end of the 2021–22 campaign in December 2013. The American sportswear brand increased the €6.5m annual commitment it had with the club to €25m. In June 2019, PSG and Nike signed a long-term extension through 2032, reportedly worth €80 million per year, making it one of the most lucrative kit deals in European football and the largest sponsorship agreement in the club's history. The agreement covers the men's and women's football teams as well as the handball section.

In September 2018, PSG and Nike-owned basketball brand Air Jordan announced a partnership under which Jordan would produce selected PSG kits and apparel. Originally signed for three years and subsequently extended several times, the agreement is currently expected to run until at least 2027 and is reportedly worth around €67 million per year. The 2021–22 home shirt was the first PSG home kit to feature the Jordan logo, after the brand had previously produced only the club's away, third and fourth kits.

== Transfer activity ==
PSG transfer record history
Year	Player	From / To	Fee (€)	Source
Record arrivals
1973	(France) Jean-Pierre Dogliani	(France) Monaco	10,000	
1973	(Republic of the Congo) François M'Pelé	(France) Ajaccio	130,000	
1974	(Algeria) Mustapha Dahleb	(France) Sedan	205,000	
1975	(Portugal) Humberto Coelho	(Portugal) Benfica	205,000	
1977	(Argentina) Carlos Bianchi	(France) Reims	230,000	
1979	(Portugal) João Alves	(Portugal) Benfica	760,000	
1986	(Senegal) Jules Bocandé	(France) Metz	1,500,000	
1991	(Brazil) Ricardo	(Portugal) Benfica	4,600,000	
1992	(Liberia) George Weah	(France) Monaco	6,500,000	
1997	(France) Florian Maurice	(France) Lyon	7,000,000	
1998	(Nigeria) Jay-Jay Okocha	(Turkey) Fenerbahçe	12,400,000	
2000	(France) Nicolas Anelka	(Spain) Real Madrid	34,500,000	
2011	(Argentina) Javier Pastore	(Italy) Palermo	42,000,000	
2014	(Uruguay) Edinson Cavani	(Italy) Napoli	64,000,000	
2017	(Brazil) Neymar	(Spain) Barcelona	222,000,000	
Record departures
1977	(Portugal) Humberto Coelho	(Portugal) Benfica	107,000	
1979	(Argentina) Carlos Bianchi	(France) Strasbourg	230,000	
1982	(Socialist Federal Republic of Yugoslavia) Ivica Šurjak	(Italy) Udinese	460,000	
1991	(France) Jocelyn Angloma	(France) Marseille	6,000,000	
1995	(Liberia) George Weah	(Italy) AC Milan	6,900,000	
1997	(Brazil) Leonardo	(Italy) AC Milan	8,500,000	
2001	(France) Laurent Robert	(England) Newcastle United	14,330,000	
2002	(France) Nicolas Anelka	(England) Manchester City	15,000,000	
2003	(Brazil) Ronaldinho	(Spain) Barcelona	30,000,000	
2016	(Brazil) David Luiz	(England) Chelsea	35,000,000	
2018	(Portugal) Gonçalo Guedes	(Spain) Valencia	40,000,000	
2023	(Brazil) Neymar	(Saudi Arabia) Al Hilal	90,000,000	
2026	(France) Bradley Barcola	(England) Liverpool	125,000,000	

=== Before QSI ===
==== Dogliani, the original transfer record ====
Paris Saint-Germain have spent billions on player transfers since Qatar Sports Investments (QSI) acquired the club in 2011. However, PSG were also active in the transfer market in earlier decades, particularly under presidents Daniel Hechter and Francis Borelli in the 1970s and 1980s. Jean-Pierre Dogliani became the club's first record signing in the summer of 1973, when Hechter paid Monaco €10k for the French playmaker. He was soon surpassed by François M'Pelé, who joined from Ajaccio in December 1973 for €130k.

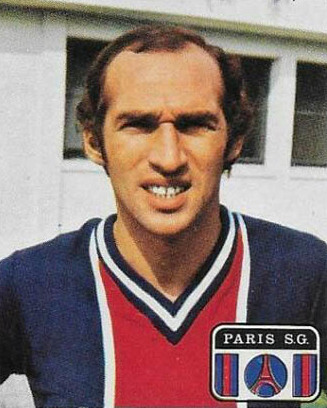
Once-club-record signing Carlos Bianchi.

After becoming president in June 1974, Hechter signed Mustapha Dahleb from Sedan for a French record €205k, regarded as PSG's first star signing. A year later, the club paid the same fee for Humberto Coelho from Benfica. He later became the club's record sale when he returned to Benfica for €107k in 1977. Carlos Bianchi arrived that same year from Stade de Reims for €230k, becoming PSG's most expensive player at the time and Hechter's final signing as president. His right-hand man, vice-president Francis Borelli, succeeded him.

When Bianchi left in 1979 to join Strasbourg for €230k, he also became PSG's most valuable sale up to that point. He was eventually surpassed by Ivica Šurjak, sold for €460k to Udinese in 1982. Borelli continued his predecessor's transfer policy, breaking the club record in 1979 with the signing of João Alves from Benfica for €760k. Jules Bocandé nearly doubled this figure in 1986, joining from Metz for €1.5 million.

==== Anelka and Ronaldinho ====
PSG also made waves in the transfer market during the 1990s and early 2000s. Backed by French media group Canal+, which acquired the club in May 1991, PSG broke its transfer record twice ahead of the 1991–92 season. Brazil international Ricardo arrived from Benfica for €4.6m, while French right back Jocelyn Angloma was sold to Marseille for €6m. Both records were later surpassed by Liberian striker George Weah. The Parisian club paid €6.5m to sign him from Monaco in 1992 and then sold him for €6.9m to AC Milan in 1995.

The spending continued with French prodigy Florian Maurice, who became the most expensive transfer in France when he joined the capital club from Lyon for €7m in 1997. PSG then broke the national transfer record twice more, signing Jay-Jay Okocha from Fenerbahçe for €12.4m in 1998, and later paying Real Madrid €34.5m for Nicolas Anelka in 2000. In terms of departures, Brazilian winger Leonardo was sold to AC Milan for €8.5m in 1997, becoming the club's record sale at the time. This was later surpassed by Laurent Robert's €14.33m move to Newcastle United for €14.33m in 2001, followed by Anelka's €15m transfer to Manchester City in 2002, and Ronaldinho's €30m move to Barcelona for €30m in 2003.

=== After QSI ===
==== Neymar, Mbappé and Messi ====
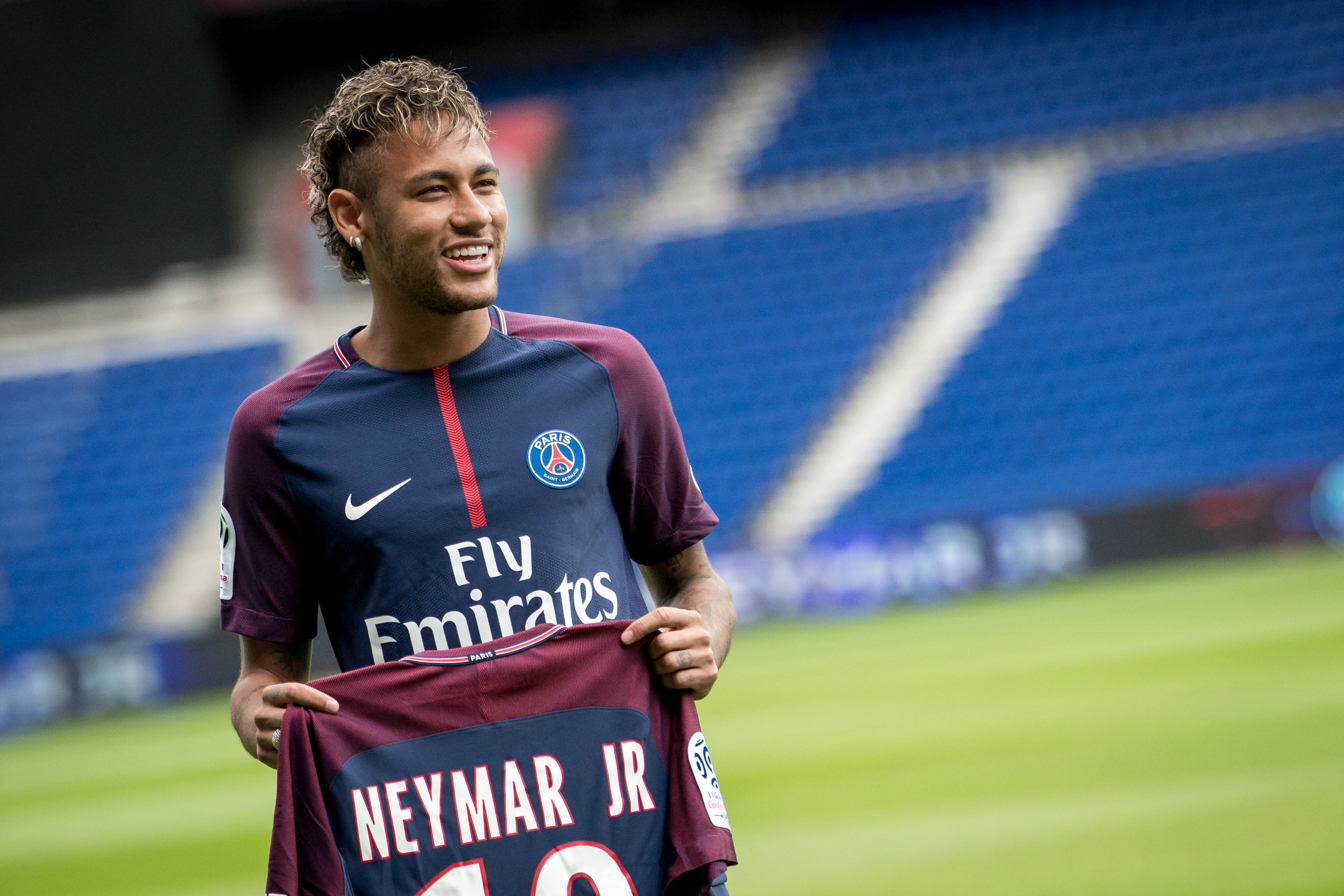
PSG broke the world transfer record with the signing of Neymar in 2017.

Following their takeover by QSI in June 2011, Paris Saint-Germain broke the French transfer record with the purchase of Argentine playmaker Javier Pastore from Palermo for €42m that summer. This fee was matched by Thiago Silva, who was signed from AC Milan in 2012, and then eclipsed by the €64m capture of Edinson Cavani from Napoli in 2013. The club also spent heavily on several other stars, including Zlatan Ibrahimović, David Luiz and Ángel Di María. On the sales side, David Luiz and Gonçalo Guedes also commanded significant fees, with both surpassing Ronaldinho in PSG's list of record sales. Chelsea paid €35m for David Luiz in the 2016 winter transfer window, while Valencia acquired Guedes for €40m in the 2018 summer window.

In August 2017, PSG broke the world transfer record with the signing of Neymar. Dubbed by media outlets as "the transfer of the century," the Brazil playmaker became the most expensive player in history after PSG activated his €222m release clause to sign him from Barcelona. Later that month, young French forward Kylian Mbappé joined from Monaco in a deal worth €180 million, paid in instalments over several years. The transfer made him the second-most expensive player in football history.

Since then, PSG have been required to moderate their transfer spending due to UEFA Financial Fair Play Regulations. In the summer of 2019, the club recorded €106m in sales and €95m in signings, marking the first time in the QSI era that PSG posted a positive transfer balance, with a surplus of €11m. They still signed Mauro Icardi for €50m in 2020–21 and Achraf Hakimi for €60m in 2021–22. In addition to Hakimi, PSG signed Lionel Messi, Sergio Ramos, Gianluigi Donnarumma and Georginio Wijnaldum on free transfers, while Nuno Mendes arrived on an initial loan, which was later made permanent in 2022 for €38m. PSG's summer of 2021 has been described as one of the most notable transfer windows in football history.

==== From superstars to team strategy ====
Bradley Barcola became PSG's record sale in 2026.

In June 2022, PSG president Nasser Al-Khelaifi announced the end of the club's "superstar era", shifting its focus towards a team-first approach centred on financial sustainability and youth development. Several high-profile players departed in 2023, including Lionel Messi and Sergio Ramos upon the expiration of their contracts, while Neymar was sold to Al Hilal for a club-record €90 million as PSG recorded a club-record €210 million in transfer sales. Kylian Mbappé left for Real Madrid on a free transfer in 2024 after running down his contract.

As part of the rebuild, PSG invested in young French players such as Ousmane Dembélé, Warren Zaïre-Emery, Bradley Barcola and Désiré Doué, alongside international prospects including Vitinha, Lucas Beraldo, Manuel Ugarte, João Neves, Willian Pacho and Lee Kang-in. In September 2025, PSG sold Gianluigi Donnarumma to Manchester City for €30m after failing to agree on a contract renewal, with the goalkeeper seeking a salary that would have destabilized the club's wage structure. Sporting director Luís Campos reiterated the club's merit-based approach to salaries and playing time, reflecting its continued focus on financial discipline.

The 2026 summer transfer window continued this approach, with the departures of several key players, including Gonçalo Ramos, Lee Kang-in, Ibrahim Mbaye and Bradley Barcola, generating a club-record €334 million in sales. Nearly half of this total came from Barcola's transfer to Liverpool for €125 million, surpassing Neymar as the most expensive sale in the club's history. The previous PSG record for transfer revenue was €210 million in 2023. PSG signed Ferran Torres, Mika Godts, Maghnes Akliouche and Lucas Digne as replacements for the departing players, for a combined fee of €152 million. With a positive transfer balance of €182 million, PSG recorded the highest positive transfer balance in the club's history, marking the second time in the QSI era and the first time since 2019 that the club recorded a positive transfer balance.
