= Pierre Blayau =

French business executive (born 1950)

- Born: 14 December 1950 (age 75); Rennes, France
- Education: ENS de Saint-Cloud; Sciences Po, ÉNA
- Occupation: Businessman

Pierre Blayau (born 14 December 1950) is a French business executive. From 2001 to 2013, he was the president of GEODIS Logistics Deutschland GmbH, a subsidiary of SNCF.

== Early life and education ==
Originally from Rennes, Brittany, he is an alumnus of the École normale supérieure of Saint-Cloud, Sciences Po and the École nationale d'administration, finishing his studies in 1978.

== Career ==
Blayau worked extensively in French football, first with AS Nancy and, later, with his hometown team Stade Rennais F.C., of which he was the president from 1998 to 2000. He was also treasurer of the Ligue de Football Professionnel from 2003 to 2005, and part of the organising group for the 1998 FIFA World Cup in France. On 2 May 2005, he was named president of Paris Saint-Germain F.C. by its owners, Canal+, in place of Francis Graille. He lasted just under a year in the job, as the sale of the club to Colony Capital led to his replacement by Alain Cayzac.

== Other activities ==
- Areva, chair of the board of directors (2013–2014)
- Cellnex, independent member of the board of directors (since 2015)
