= Jason Tré =

French footballer (born 1998)

Personal information
- Date of birth: 18 March 1998 (age 28)
- Place of birth: Saint-Denis, France
- Height: 1.75 m (5 ft 9 in)
- Position: Left back

Senior career*
Years	Team	Apps	(Gls)
2016–2018	Caen B	9	(0)
2018–2019	Paris FC B	25	(1)
2019	Paris FC	2	(0)
2019–2021	Laval B	1	(0)
2019–2021	Laval	38	(0)
2021–2023	Red Star	28	(0)
2024–2026	Quevilly-Rouen	24	(0)
- * Club domestic league appearances and goals as of 23 June 2026

Jason Tré (born 18 March 1998) is a French professional footballer who plays as a left back.

== Career ==
Tré was trained at INF Clairefontaine and Caen, signing for Paris FC ahead of the 2018–19 season.

He made his senior debut for Paris FC in a 3–0 Ligue 2 loss to Lorient on 29 July 2019.

In November 2019 Tré left Paris FC and signed a two-year contrat fédéral (semi-pro contract) with Laval.

On 16 August 2021, he moved to Red Star.
