= Kate Robertson (advertising) =

South African advertising executive (born c. 1956)

- Born: c. 1956; Johannesburg
- Education: University of Cape Town
- Occupation: CEO
- Known for: co-founding One Young World
- Spouse: Bruce
- Children: Ella Robertson McKay

Kate Robertson (born c. 1956) is a South African-born advertising executive who was formerly the president of Havas Worldwide. She co-founded the charity One Young World.

== Early life and education ==
Kate Robertson was born in about 1956 in Johannesburg, South Africa. She studied law at the University of Cape Town.

== Career ==
Robertson's early work in South Africa was selling advertising for radio before she left for Europe. She worked for shop companies before she joined the advertising company Havas Worldwide,⋅ where she was promoted to be the global president and UK chairperson.

In February 2010 the first One Young World summit was held in London. The organisation was started by Robertson and David Jones.

In 2019 she and Ella Robertson created the book How to Make A Difference: The Definitive Guide From The World's Most Effective Activists. It included contributions from activists Bob Geldof, Emma Watson, and the writer Fatima Bhutto.

In July 2023 she resigned from the board ofOne Young World after ten years as a trustee, but she remained CEO. The Charity Commission had started an enquiry after it emerged that her pay had been £440,000 over an 18-month period, while her daughter Ella Robertson McKay had been paid £195,000. Nearly 30% of the charity's income of £7.5m had been £2.2m paid in salaries.

== Recognition and honours ==
In 2015 Robertson was awarded an honorary doctorate by Lausanne Business School.
