= Havas Creative =

French advertising agency

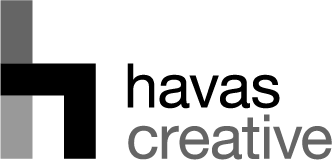
- Type: Subsidiary
- Industry: Advertising
- Founded: 1991; 35 years ago
- Headquarters: New York City (HQ), 316 Offices worldwide
- Key people: Yannick Bolloré (Global CEO)
- Products: Advertising & Marketing
- Number of employees: 11,000
- Parent: Havas

Havas Creative, formerly known as Havas Worldwide and Euro RSCG, is a French advertising agency. It is one of the largest integrated marketing communications agencies in the world, made up of 316 offices located in 75 countries. The firm provides advertising, marketing, and corporate communications services.

In 2010, Advertising Age listed the firm, (then called Euro RSCG), as having more global assignments than any other network for the fifth consecutive year, making the agency the world's largest network by global accounts. Headquartered in New York, Havas Creative is the largest unit of Havas (Euronext Paris SA: HAV.PA), the fifth largest communications group in the world, behind Omnicom, WPP, Interpublic, and Publicis.

== Corporate history ==
In 1970, Bernard Roux and Jacques Séguéla established an agency called Roux Séguéla. In 1972, Alain Cayzac joined Roux Séguéla, and the company became Roux Séguéla Cayzac.

In 1975, Havas Conseil reconstituted as a Eurocom holding company.

In 1976, Roux Séguéla Cayzac merged with Jean-Michel Goudard to form RSCG; each letter in RSCG corresponds to the name of each of their founders: Roux, Séguela, Cayzac, and Goudard.

In 1991, Eurocom S.A. acquired RSCG to form Euro RSCG. In 1997, Euro RSCG Worldwide moved its headquarters from Paris to New York; American executive Bob Schmetterer was named chairman and CEO.

In 2001, the company acquired a minority stake in UK financial public relations firm, The Maitland Consultancy.

In 2012, the firm, having by then been acquired by Paris, France-based advertising and public relations company Havas, was rebranded as Havas Worldwide.

In March 2022, Havas announced the acquisition of Front Networks, an independent creative agency focusing on social and digital marketing in China.

== Leadership ==
In 2014, Havas Group Chairman Yannick Bolloré also became Global CEO of Havas, and Andrew Benett was named Global CEO of Havas Worldwide.

Previous CEO David Jones was named CEO of the firm, then named Euro RSCG Worldwide, in 2005. He also became Global CEO of parent company Havas in 2011. Kate Robertson was the Global President and from 2006 to 2015 she was UK Group Chairman of Havas Worldwide. She founded One Young World with David Jones in 2009.

Mercedes Erra (Managing Director, Havas) is the executive president of Havas Worldwide, and credited with the company's Evian campaign "Roller Babies," which made headlines and a mention in the Guinness Book of World Records for receiving over 75 million views.

== Key clients ==
Havas Worldwide works with 78 of the 100 largest global advertisers including Camel Cigarettes, Natural American Spirit, Grizzly Snuff, Vuse, Air France, Citigroup, Danone Group, IBM, Lacoste, LVMH, Merck, Mondelēz International, Pernod Ricard, Reckitt Benckiser, Sanofi, The Humane Society of the United States, and Unilever.

== Divisions ==
The firm consists of four divisions:

- Havas Worldwide (Strategy, Creative, Production Automation & Implementation)
- Havas Worldwide Digital (Digital, Direct, Data & Analytics, CRM, Promotions, Channel Management, Motivation & Education)
- Havas PR (Public Relations, Corporate Communications, Internal Communications, and Corporate Identity)
- Arnold Worldwide, an American advertising agency

== Controversies ==
In July 2019, the firm created an advertisement for a Singaporean media company. In the ad, Mediacorp actor and deejay Dennis Chew, who is Chinese, appeared in "brownface" - the act of darkening one's fair skin to mimic that of another race — as an Indian character and as a Malay woman wearing a headscarf. The ad sparked backlash online and Havas worldwide apologized subsequently.
