= PEF Saint-Sébastien-sur-Loire =

Football academy in Saint-Sébastien-sur-Loire, France

Pôle Espoirs Fédéral de Saint-Sébastien-sur-Loire, commonly referred to as PEF Saint-Sébastien-sur-Loire, is the regional association football centre and is one of the sixteen élite academies of France. Located in Saint-Sébastien-sur-Loire, Loire-Atlantique, only the best players from the Pays de la Loire région train there. There are eight other élite youth academies in Metropolitan France (Castelmaurou, Châteauroux, Clairefontaine, Liévin, Dijon, Marseille, Vichy and Reims) covering the whole territory.

== Youth development ==
PEF Saint-Sébastien-sur-Loire incorporates the same training methods as Clairefontaine:

- Making the player’s movements faster and better
- Linking movements efficiently and wisely
- Using the weaker foot
- Weaknesses in the player’s game
- Psychological factors (sports personality tests)
- Medical factors
- Physical tests (beep test)
- Technical skills
- Skill training (juggling the ball, running with the ball, dribbling, kicking, passing and ball control)
- Tactical (to help the ball carrier, to get the ball back, to offer support, to pass the ball and follow the pass, positioning and the movement into space)
