= Charles Villeneuve =

French journalist

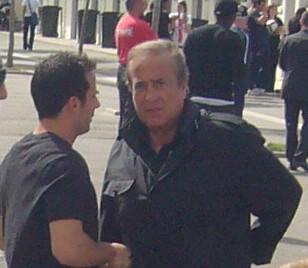
- Villeneuve (right) with PSG player Ludovic Giuly
- Born: Charles Leroy; 19 July 1941 (age 85); Beirut, Lebanon
- Occupation: Television journalist

Charles Villeneuve (born Charles Leroy; 19 July 1941) is a French journalist.

He was the sports director of the television channel TF1.

On 27 May 2008, he was named as president of Paris Saint-Germain F.C. ahead of the new season, after the one-month interim of Simon Tahar; PSG had narrowly avoided relegation from Ligue 1. He was the third journalist to hold the post, after Michel Denisot and Charles Biétry in the 1990s.

In January 2009, he wrote a letter to the club's board in which he criticised their lack of investment. The letter was leaked to Le Parisien. He was then dismissed by owners Colony Capital, whose managing director of Europe Sébastien Bazin took that position at the club.
