= Guy Crescent =

French businessman (1920–1996)

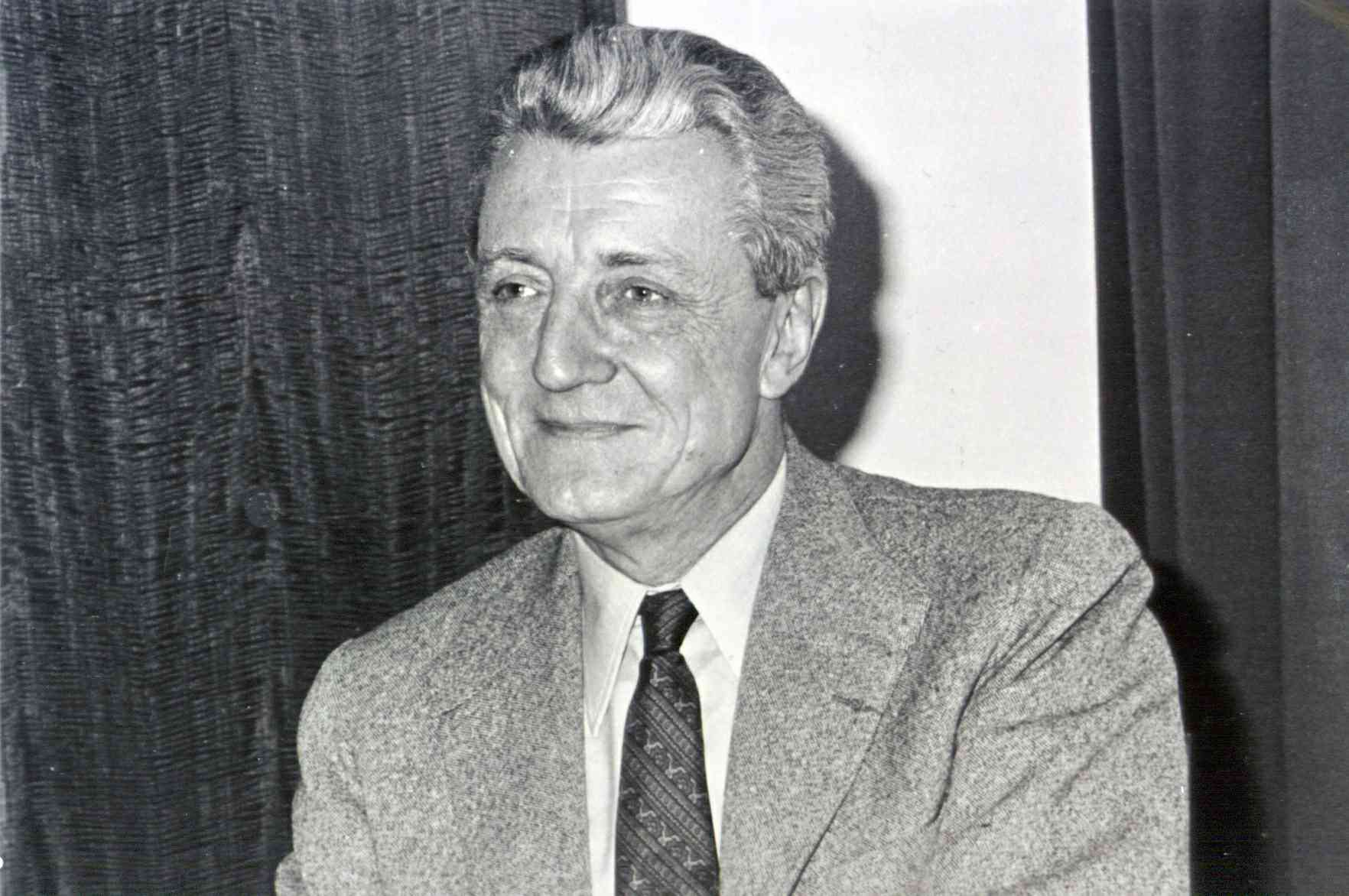
- Born: 10 June 1920; Paris, France
- Died: 16 October 1996 (aged 76); Paris, France
- Resting place: Père Lachaise Cemetery
- Occupation: Businessman

Guy Crescent (10 June 1920 – 16 October 1996) was a French businessman. He was the president of transport company Calberson from 1963 to 1985, and of football club Paris Saint-Germain in 1971, which he helped create a year prior.

== Biography ==
=== Early life ===
Guy Crescent was born on 10 June 1920 in Paris. He was diagnosed with polio at the age of three months.

He completed eight years of mecanotherapy and rehabilitation, and as a result was able to walk for the first time at the age of twelve.

=== Education and World War II ===
Crescent completed his secondary schooling at the Collège Stanislas de Paris and the Lycée Saint-Louis-de-Gonzague, and subsequently joined the Paris Law Faculty. His studies were interrupted by World War II. He eventually obtained the Baccalauréat and a law degree.

Due to his disability, Crescent was exempt from military duties, but joined the Alliance network in the French Resistance by February 1941. He completed missions in Germany, on behalf of the special services in September 1944 until June 1945, seconded to the Third United States Army.

=== Calberson ===
Crescent's professional activities were always carried out within the Calberson group. He entered the company successively as a truck oiler and a truck driver, before eventually being appointed as the technical and commercial director on 1 July 1950. Crescent was appointed as the president on 15 September 1963.

Guy Crescent retired in 1985, after 43 years of being in the company. He was then named Honorary President of Calberson.

=== Paris Saint-Germain and Paris FC ===
Crescent contributed to the revival of football in Paris in 1970 by participating in the creation of Paris Saint-Germain Football Club (PSG). Initially vice president from 1970 to 1971, he became president of the club in June 1971, a role in which he would stay for six months.

In 1970, he brought about the formation of PSG, with the help of some passionate industrialists like him (Henri Patrelle and Pierre-Étienne Guyot), and in conjunction with the French Football Federation. The professional team was created, taking care of its young players, and participating in the national championship to support the new stadium, the Parc des Princes, replacing the previous one that had to be destroyed for the penetration of the Boulevard Périphérique.

In 1971, while he was the president of PSG, Crescent was at the center of efforts to bring Brazilian footballer Pelé to Paris. Crescent traveled to Brazil to engage in negotiations with Pelé's club Santos, who was in need of money, but the move never materialized.

A documentary film titled PSG, ce club qui a failli ne pas exister (transl. PSG, this club that almost did not exist) was made in 2016. It traced back the first four years of managing the Parisian club which had never been told, especially by those who were involved in the adventure.

In 1972, PSG split into two. Crescent became the president of Paris FC, the newly re-formed club, from 1973 to 1975.

For the occasion of the 50th anniversary of PSG in 2020, the president of the club Nasser Al-Khelaifi along with the city of Poissy decided to pay tribute to Crescent by renaming a street near the new Paris Saint-Germain Training Center in honour of him.

=== Other activities ===
His entire life, Guy Crescent helped people with disabilities, and was involved in numerous associative and humanitarian actions, particularly in the fight against cancer and the reintegration of former drug addicts into the working world.

Notably, Crescent has been:

- Honorary President of SOS Amitié
- president of the Bank of Life Cancer Research Association
- vice-president of the Napoléon Bullukian Foundation in Lyon
- member of the Rotary Club of Paris. As part of Rotary, he created Rotaract in France, for young people aged 18 to 20.

Guy Crescent's associative life and humanitarian actions were influenced from the very beginning of his life, as he contracted polio at the age of three months, which had fully paralyzed his lower limbs.

At the age of four, Crescent benefited from a new method of polio treatment that had been invented by Dr. Nicod, a Swiss. It was called mechanotherapy. Crescent was first able to walk at the age of twelve, using heavy orthopedic devices. He simultaneously continued with his studies in this period of frenzied rehabilitation. Guy would not forget all those, like himself, that had been affected by this disease, and later in his life, he would go on to do several humanitarian actions.

From an early age, Crescent showed an attachment to sports, which he deemed for the handicapped an essential element of rehabilitation. In 1952, he would come under the aegis of FFF President Pierre Pochonet and the French Football Federation as a member of the commission of football advertising and development.

Crescent would bring his full support to the Association des Paralysés de France, for the development of applications and jobs in companies for people with polio. In the same year of 1952, he participated at the Raymond Poincaré University Hospital (pavillon Letulle), taking care of paraplegics assigned there by Professor Jean Benassy. Benassy would invent a jumpsuit which, after being put on the patient, would stiffen and allow the patient to go home before the arrival of social assistance. This would transform the lives of those concerned, who would no longer be in the same situation of total dependence.

== Personal life ==
Crescent has a son named Bruno.

== Honours ==
- Legion of Honour
- Ordre national du Mérite
- Officer of Order of Malta
- Cross of the Resistance Volunteer Combatant
- Combatant's Cross of Europe
- Gold medal of the Syndicats Professionnels
- Médaille d'honneur du travail
