= Simon Tahar =

French lawyer (born 1948)

Simon Tahar (born 30 March 1948) is a French lawyer. He has represented musicians such as Yannick Noah and MC Solaar.

On 23 April 2008, he became president of Paris Saint-Germain F.C. on an interim basis when Alain Cayzac has resigned with the club facing relegation from Ligue 1. On 27 May, having preserved the club's status, owners Colony Capital replaced him with Charles Villeneuve.

He represented the rapper Orelsan in a long-lasting freedom of speech case. The artist had been reported in 2009 by the feminist group Ni Putes Ni Soumises for the lyrics of his song "Sale Pute" ("Dirty Whore"), in which a man murders his unfaithful partner; they considered it incitement to violence against women. He was acquitted in June 2012. In May 2013, action by five feminist organisations resulted with a new trial that found the rapper guilty and fined him €1,000.
