= Henri Patrelle =

French football executive (1918–1995)

- Born: 5 November 1918; Avesnes-en-Bray, France
- Died: 12 December 1995 (aged 77); Ville-la-Grand, France
- Occupation(s): Footballer; Football executive
Association football career
Senior career*
Years	Team	Apps	(Gls)
1942	Stade Saint-Germain		
- * Club domestic league appearances and goals

Henri Patrelle (5 November 1918 – 25 December 1995) was a French football player and executive who served as president of Stade Saint-Germain and its successor Paris Saint-Germain.

Being the "backbone" of Stade Saint-Germain from 1942 onwards, Patrelle worked as president of the club from 1958 to 1962 and 1964 to 1970. He would also become president of Paris Saint-Germain (PSG) from 1971 to 1974. Additionally, Patrelle worked as vice president of the French Football Federation in the late 1960s.

== Playing career ==
Patrelle was a footballer before becoming an executive. In 1942, he played for Stade Saint-Germain.

== Executive career ==
While working for Stade Saint-Germain, Patrelle also held other positions in football. He worked for the Ligue de Paris and the Commission du Football Amateur, and also served as vice president of the French Football Federation in the late 1960s. Patrelle's two spells as Stade Saint-Germain president were from 1958 to 1962 and 1964 to 1970.

In the summer of 1970, Patrelle was collaborating with Guy Crescent and Pierre-Étienne Guyot to create a new football team. They eventually agreed to merge Patrelle's Stade Saint-Germain and Crescent and Guyot's virtual Paris FC (founded a year earlier). Paris Saint-Germain was born as a result of the merger. Patrelle was initially vice president from its creation in August 1970 up to December 1971, when he took over as president to succeed Crescent.

After PSG's first season in existence, they were promoted to the Division 1. In the 1971–72 season, they secured a safe 16th-place finish — however, the club was in a "delicate" financial situation. The Paris City Council offered PSG 850,000 francs to pay the club's debt and keep it alive in the Division 1, but asking that the name of the club be switched to Paris Football Club. Patrelle refused the name change, and financial aid was removed. The club split in 1972, and PSG were administratively relegated to the third tier and handed the reserve players, while PFC were re-created and kept the spot in the first tier.

Along with Fernand Sastre, Patrelle was the great architect of the reform of the French football pyramid in 1970, helping to break the segregation between amateur and professional clubs. The Division 3 was founded in 1971, and became an "open" league, mixing together reserve sides of professional clubs, amateur sides, and relegated professional clubs.

At the 1978 FIFA World Cup in Argentina, Patrelle was the intendant of the France national team, who were playing against Hungary in their final group match after having been eliminated. France were supposed to play in blue, but there was an issue; both teams had only brought their white jerseys. Patrelle later recalled that this was an error of his and that he was responsible. The French blue kits had been left in Buenos Aires, and were already in suitcases ready for the departure of the team back to France. In the end, France had to borrow white jerseys with green stripes from local club Kimberley de Mar del Plata. The match finished in a 3–1 victory for France, but the error would cost Patrelle his job as intendant.
