= PEF Ploufragan =

French football academy

The Pôle Espoirs Football de Ploufragan, based at the Centre Technique Régional Henri Guérin (Henri Guérin Regional Technical Centre), commonly referred to as PEF Ploufragan, is one of the sixteen élite academies of France; only the best players from the Brittany région train there. There are thirteen other élite youth academies in Metropolitan France (Castelmaurou, Châteauroux, Clairefontaine, Liévin, Dijon, Aix-en-Provence, Reims, etc) covering the whole territory.

== History ==
Located in Ploufragan, Brittany, the facility, known nationally as Pôle Espoirs Football de Ploufragan, began operation in 1997 as a result of an initiative created by former France national football team manager Henri Guérin, whom the centre is named after, and Paul Le Hesran. Like its other regional counterparts, it is a stepping stone for a few of the most promising players. The center did have the honor of training current national team member and former Ligue 1 Player of the Year Yoann Gourcuff.

== Youth development ==
PEF Ploufragan incorporates the same training methods as Clairefontaine:

- Making the player's movements faster and better
- Linking movements efficiently and wisely
- Using the weaker foot
- Weaknesses in the player's game
- Psychological factors (sports personality tests)
- Medical factors
- Physical tests (beep test)
- Technical skills
- Skill training (juggling the ball, running with the ball, dribbling, kicking, passing and ball control)
- Tactical (to help the ball carrier, to get the ball back, to offer support, to pass the ball and follow the pass, positioning and the movement into space)

The center also provides students with a normal education curriculum, allows them to spend weekends and holidays with their families, and gives them the opportunity to continue training at their local club.

== Notable former players ==
- Romain Danzé
- Yoann Gourcuff
- Pierre-Yves Hamel
- Vincent Le Goff
- Sylvain Marveaux
- Virgile Reset
- Mamadou Samassa
- Frédéric Sammaritano
- William Stanger
