= David Jones (advertising executive) =

British businessman

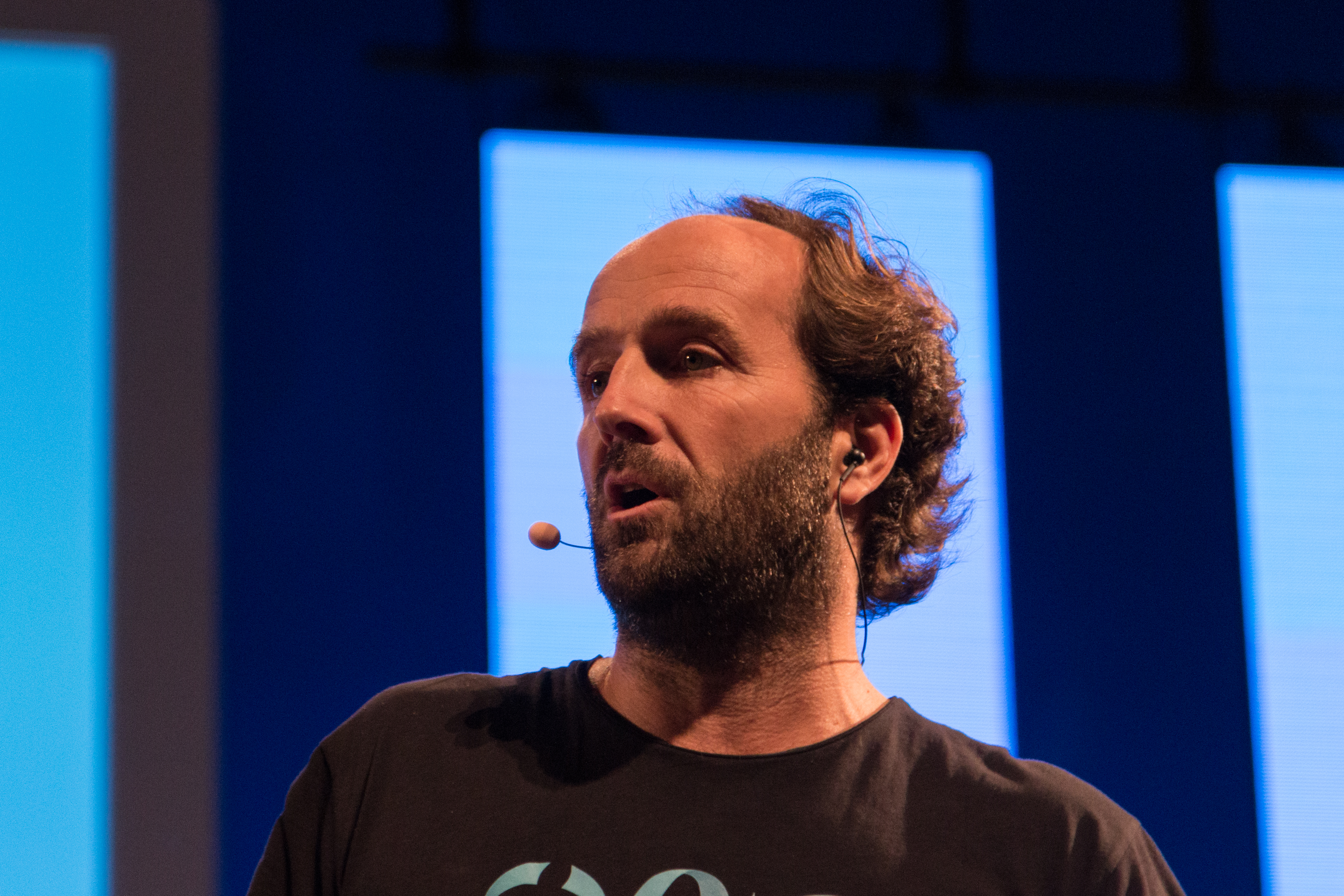
- David Jones at One Young World in 2014
- Born: Cheshire, England
- Education: Reutlingen University; University of Middlesex
- Occupations: Former CEO of Havas and cofounder of Havas Worldwide
- Spouse: Karine Bernard
- Partner: 4

David Robert Jones is a British businessman who is the former CEO of Havas and Havas Worldwide (formerly known as Euro RSCG Worldwide), cofounder of global youth forum One Young World and founder of The Brandtech Group (ex You & Mr Jones). He is author of Who Cares Wins: Why Good Business Is Better Business (Pearson/FT Publishing, November 2011) and the creator of the "Social Business Idea".

== Early life and education ==
David Robert Jones grew up in Cheshire. He was educated at The Ryleys School and Sandbach School, and holds business degrees from Fachhochschule Reutlingen and Middlesex Business School.

== Career ==
Jones began his career as an account executive at BDH Manchester (now TBWA) before moving to JWT in Paris and then Lowe Europe. Returning to London, he became the youngest board member at AMV BBDO.

Jones' career with Havas began in 1998, when he was appointed CEO of Euro RSCG Australia at age 38. After launching the network's first digital agency, he became president of global brands for Euro RSCG Worldwide and served as global brand director on Reckitt Benckiser. In 2004 he was promoted to CEO of Euro RSCG New York and in 2005 he succeeded Jim Heekin as CEO of Euro RSCG Worldwide and also taking on duties as director general of Havas. In 2006 Euro RSCG became the first agency to be named Global Agency of the Year by both Advertising Age and Campaign in the same year. In 2009, Jones added the title of CEO of Havas Worldwide, running all the creative, marketing and design companies throughout the Havas network of 300+ offices.

From 2007 to 2010, Jones led the Euro RSCG team advising David Cameron and the UK Conservative Party.

In 2011, Jones expanded his position to encompass the entire Havas network, including Havas Media.

In 2014 Jones left Havas, and in the following year he raised $350m and launched a new "brandtech" group under the name "You & Mr. Jones".

== Change leadership ==
David Jones is creator of the "Social Business Idea"—a principle and practice that "operates at the intersection of social responsibility and social media" and "aligns the goals of doing well and doing good." He cites the Dulux Let's Colour Project as an example. Social Business Ideas are a focus of Jones' book, Who Cares Wins: Why Good Business Is Better Business, published by Pearson/FT Publishing in 2011.

At Mashable Connect 2011 and other forums, Jones has advocated using the communication skills of the advertising industry to drive social change. He told Adweek "I passionately believe that what our industry actually excels at is using our creativity to change people's behavior. Given the state of the world, I believe that we in the creative industries not only have an opportunity but an obligation to use that talent and our creativity to change people's behavior around some of the bigger issues facing the world."

In 2009, Jones co-founded youth forum One Young World with Kate Robertson, called "arguably the most forward-looking and comprehensive piece of corporate social responsibility ever attempted" by Marketing Week. In 2011, Jones' work with One Young World was recognised by the Clinton Global Initiative.

In advance of the United Nations Framework Convention on Climate Change in Copenhagen in 2009, Jones was asked by former U.N. Secretary-General Kofi Annan to create a campaign to communicate the urgent need for action. Jones drove the creation of the TckTckTck Campaign for Climate Justice, an open source campaign that recruited more than 17 million "climate allies" to the cause. In 2010 TckTckTck was short-listed for a Webby Award for world's best advocacy campaign, and listed by The Guardian as one of the Top 50 climate tweeters in the world.

== Social Business Idea ==
In Who Cares Wins, Jones defines the Social Business Idea as the overlap between what a company is good at ("a genuine and credible role for the brand or business"), and what consumers or customers are looking for ("real issues that consumers care about"). He lists as examples M·A·C's Viva Glam cosmetics partnering with Lady Gaga to raise money and awareness for HIV; Levi's Water<Less jeans line, produced with lower water usage; Marks & Spencer "Plan A" environmental commitment; Nike "Better World"; Pepsi Refresh Project, and more.

== Recognition and awards ==
- The Guardian Sustainable Business Leader 2013
- Inducted into American Advertising Federation "Hall of Achievement" (2005)
- Named to "40 Under 40" list of Crain's New York Business (2005)
- Named to Advertising Age "40 Under 40" (2006)
- Financial Times and Aviva Top 5 European Pioneering Thought Leaders (2006)
- Selected by World Economic Forum as a Young Global Leader (2008)
- Named as number two of two ad industry CEOs of the decade by readers of Adweek (2010)
- Nominated by CR Magazine as Responsible CEO of the Year (2011)
- Founding curator, Young Shapers (World Economic Forum)
- Founding ambassador, D&AD White Pencil

== Earnings ==
In 2012, David Jones earned €3,122,654 for his responsibilities within Havas.

== Personal life ==
David Jones is married to Karine Bernard and has four children. He primarily lives in New York City and owns a summer home in Île de Ré, France. He has lived and worked in the United Kingdom, Germany, France, Australia, and the United States.
