= INF Clairefontaine =

French football training facility

Clairefontaine
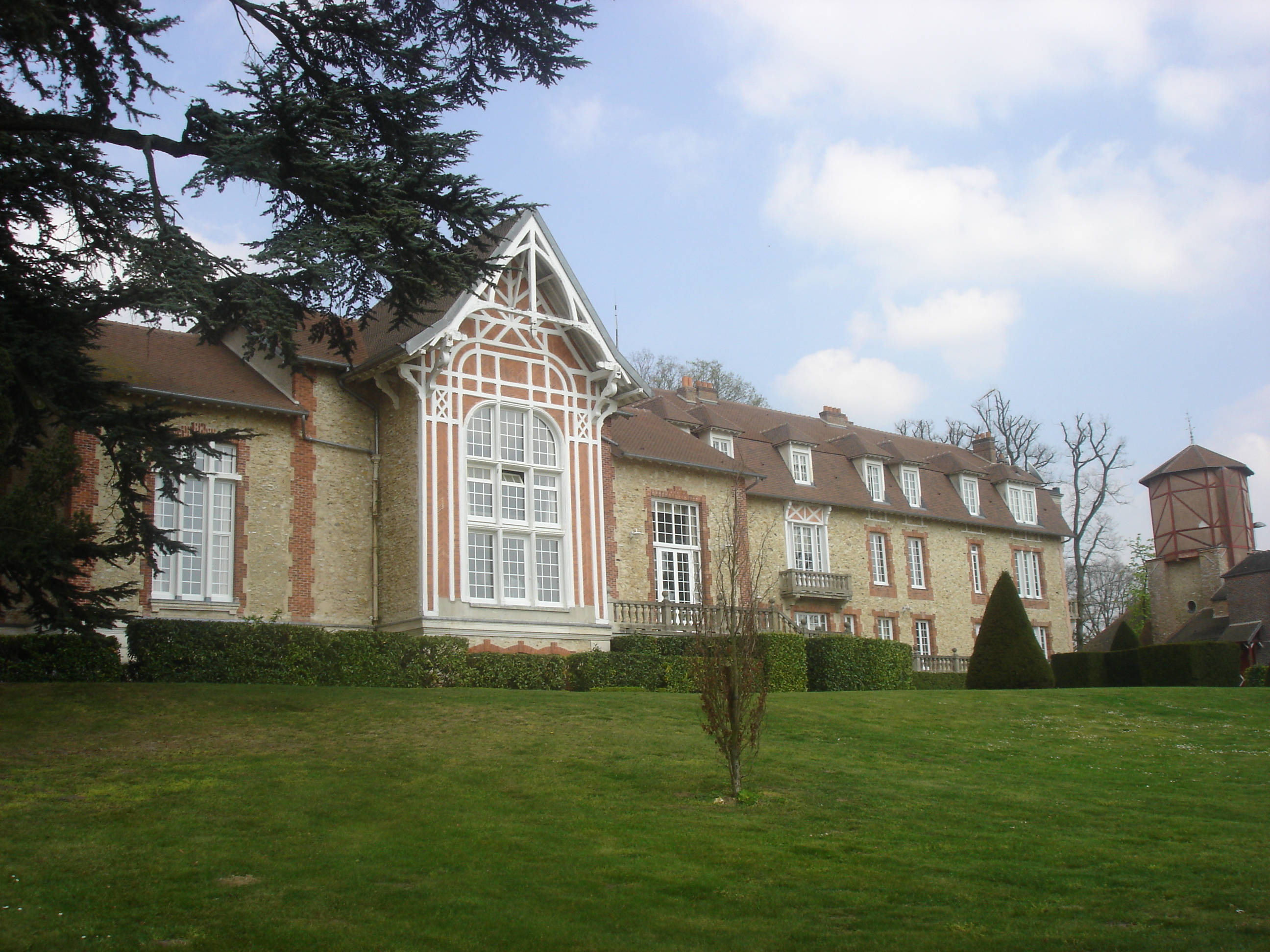
- View of the performance center
- Established: 1988
- Location: Clairefontaine-en-Yvelines, France
- Coordinates: 48°36′52.07″N 1°55′27.55″E
- Owner: French Football Federation

The INF Clairefontaine (French: Institut national du football de Clairefontaine), known as INF or simply Clairefontaine, is the national football centre that specialises in training French football players. The INF Clairefontaine is a section of the CNF Clairefontaine. The academy is one of sixteen élite academies located in and around France that are supervised by the French Football Federation (FFF). Only the best players from the Île-de-France région train at the Clairefontaine academy. The twelve other academies are situated in Castelmaurou, Châteauroux, Liévin, Dijon, Marseille, Ploufragan, Vichy and Reims, Réunion, Saint-Sébastien-sur-Loire, Guadeloupe and Talence.

Clairefontaine opened in 1988 and is named after Fernand Sastre, the president of the FFF from 1972–1984. The academy is located 50 km southwest of Paris at Clairefontaine-en-Yvelines and is one of the best known football academies in the world. It has a high reputation of producing some of the most gifted French and non-French players including Nicolas Anelka, Louis Saha, William Gallas, Hatem Ben Arfa, Abou Diaby, Medhi Benatia, Blaise Matuidi, Raphaël Guerreiro, Kylian Mbappé, and Thierry Henry. The CNF Clairefontaine is also used to house the national football team of France and the centre drew media spotlight following its usage as a base camp by the France team that won the 1998 FIFA World Cup.

== History ==
Prior to the establishment of Clairefontaine, France had little success at international football, and in large tournaments France had not won any official trophies, in contrast with its neighbours Italy and Germany. In the 1960s, Spain and England also had success, forcing France to establish a football centre to catch up. In 1976, French Football Federation president and longtime official Fernand Sastre desired the creation of a national centre of football. The project was initiated by Ștefan Kovács, who was inspired by the former Romanian communist training centres.

Six years later, following France's victory at the UEFA Euro 1984, the FFF selected Clairefontaine-en-Yvelines as the site for the centre. Construction commenced in 1985 and lasted nearly three years. The centre opened its doors in January 1988. During the 1998 World Cup, which France hosted, Clairefontaine hosted the France national team. That same year, the FFF named the centre in Fernand Sastre's honour. A bust of Sastre was put on the grounds in 2000; also present on the grounds is a statue of the FIFA World Cup.

Young football players from the Île-de-France region (which includes Paris) stay at Clairefontaine from the age of 13 to 15, for training and the development of their technical skills. A high percentage of the players go on to play in higher leagues. Today, many high-ranked local clubs play at the grounds.

== Process ==
=== Registration ===
In order for a player to be selected to the Clairefontaine academy, he/she must be at least 13 years of age, have French nationality (in the 2000s), and be living and playing within the Île-de-France region, though players living in the departments of Seine-Maritime and Eure can also apply and be selected. Registration for new players at the academy normally begins in October the year before players enroll at the academy when prospective applicants are 12 years of age. Players have until December to register with their club for acceptance into the academy. The first set of trials are carried out by each district within Île-de-France. Each district selects a set number of players who will travel to Clairefontaine to attend a tryout, which is usually held over a three-day period during the Easter school holidays. After the three days, the academy director and officials will convene to select a maximum of 22 players with three or four of the 22 being goalkeepers.

=== Training and accommodation ===
Players who are selected to attend Clairefontaine stay and train at the facilities from Monday through to Friday. Players are given the weekend off to visit family and train and play with their parent clubs. They are also given school holidays off. Players are also required to meet educational criteria. Players aged 13–15 training at Clairefontaine attend the Collège Catherine de Vivonne de Rambouilet in Rambouillet. After departing Rambouilet, players enroll at the nearby high school Lycée Louis Bascan de Rambouillet with hopes that they will earn their Baccalauréat. All costs required to attend an academy are borne by the federation and the Ligue Nationale de Football.

=== Youth development ===
Youth development at Clairefontaine incorporates many principles on football, such as:

- Making the player's movements faster and better
- Linking movements efficiently and wisely
- Using the weaker foot
- Weaknesses in the player's game
- Psychological factors (sports personality tests)
- Medical factors
- Physical tests (beep test)
- Technical skills
- Skill training (juggling the ball, running with the ball, dribbling, kicking, passing and ball control)
- Tactical (to help the ball carrier, to get the ball back, to offer support, to pass the ball and follow the pass, positioning and the movement into space)

=== Notable players ===
A large array of notable players, many of whom have represented France at the international level, have graduated from the academy. This is a short list of academy players who have represented France and other national teams:

FFF

- (France) Nicolas Anelka
- (France) Alphonse Areola
- (France) Hatem Ben Arfa
- (France) Jimmy Briand
- (France) Philippe Christanval
- (France) Abou Diaby
- (France) William Gallas
- (France) Thierry Henry
- (France) Blaise Matuidi
- (France) Kylian Mbappé
- (France) Jérôme Rothen
- (France) Louis Saha

CAF

- (Algeria) Mourad Meghni
- (Cameroon) Sébastien Bassong
- (Cameroon) Yvan Neyou
- (Democratic Republic of the Congo) Jirès Kembo-Ekoko
- (Ivory Coast) Willy Boly
- (Mauritius) Kevin Bru
- (Mauritius) Jonathan Bru
- (Mauritius) Jérémy Villeneuve
- (Morocco) Medhi Benatia
- (Senegal) Mohamed Diamé
- (Tunisia) Saîf-Eddine Khaoui
- (Tunisia) Hannibal Mejbri

UEFA

- (Poland) Damien Perquis
- (Portugal) Raphaël Guerreiro

AFC

- (Laos) Billy Ketkeophomphone
- (Thailand) Tristan Do

== Grounds ==
Clairefontaine is an immense football centre, encompassing 56 hectares of land and containing 66,000 square metres of turfed grounds. It is located in the valley of Chevreuse in the heart of the Rambouillet forest. Clairefontaine has several training grounds, a stadium pitch and even an indoor pitch made of artificial turf. The centre also includes a medical building, gym, fitness room, restaurant and cafeteria. There are even three tennis courts on the grounds.

== Gallery ==
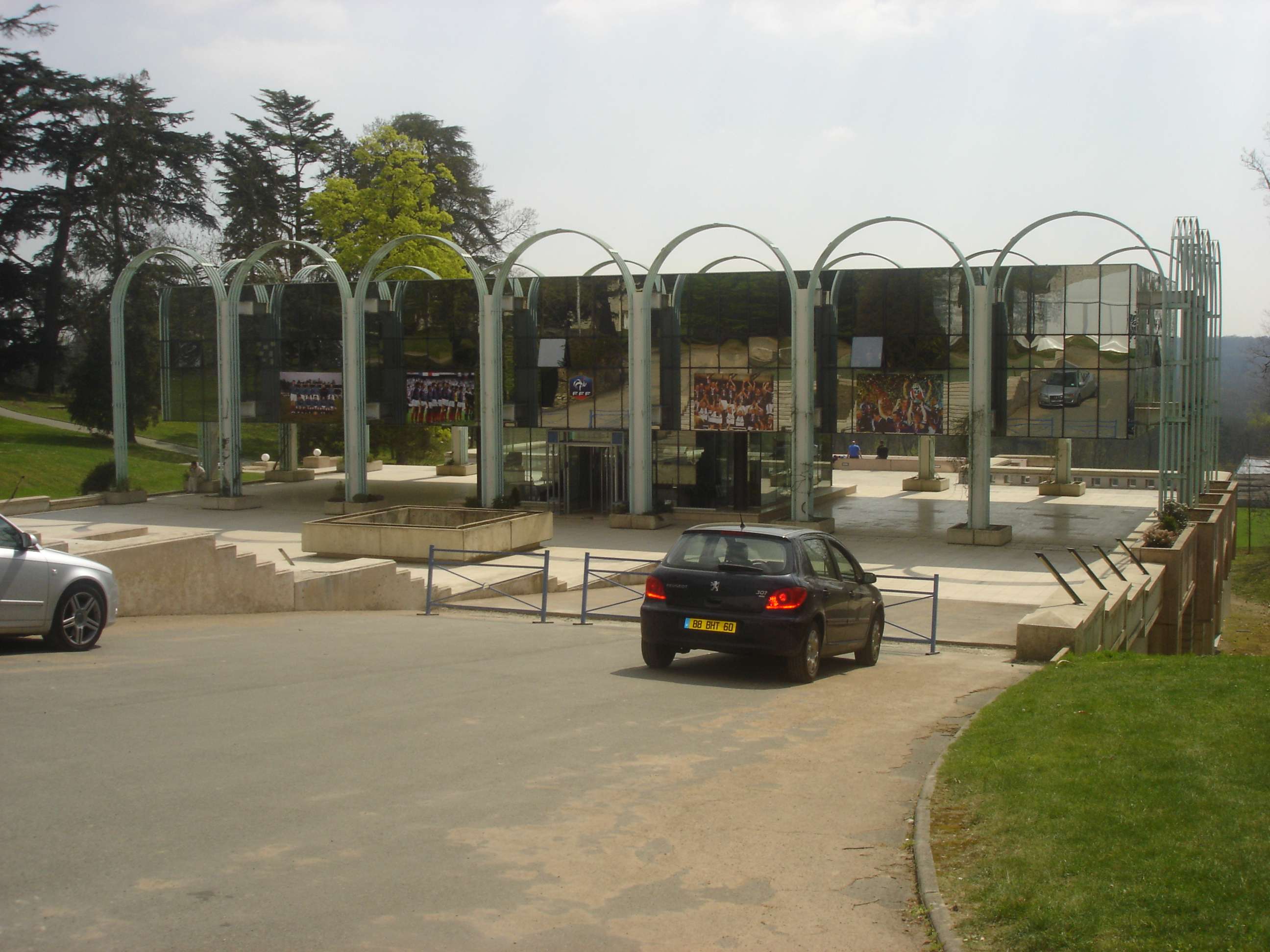

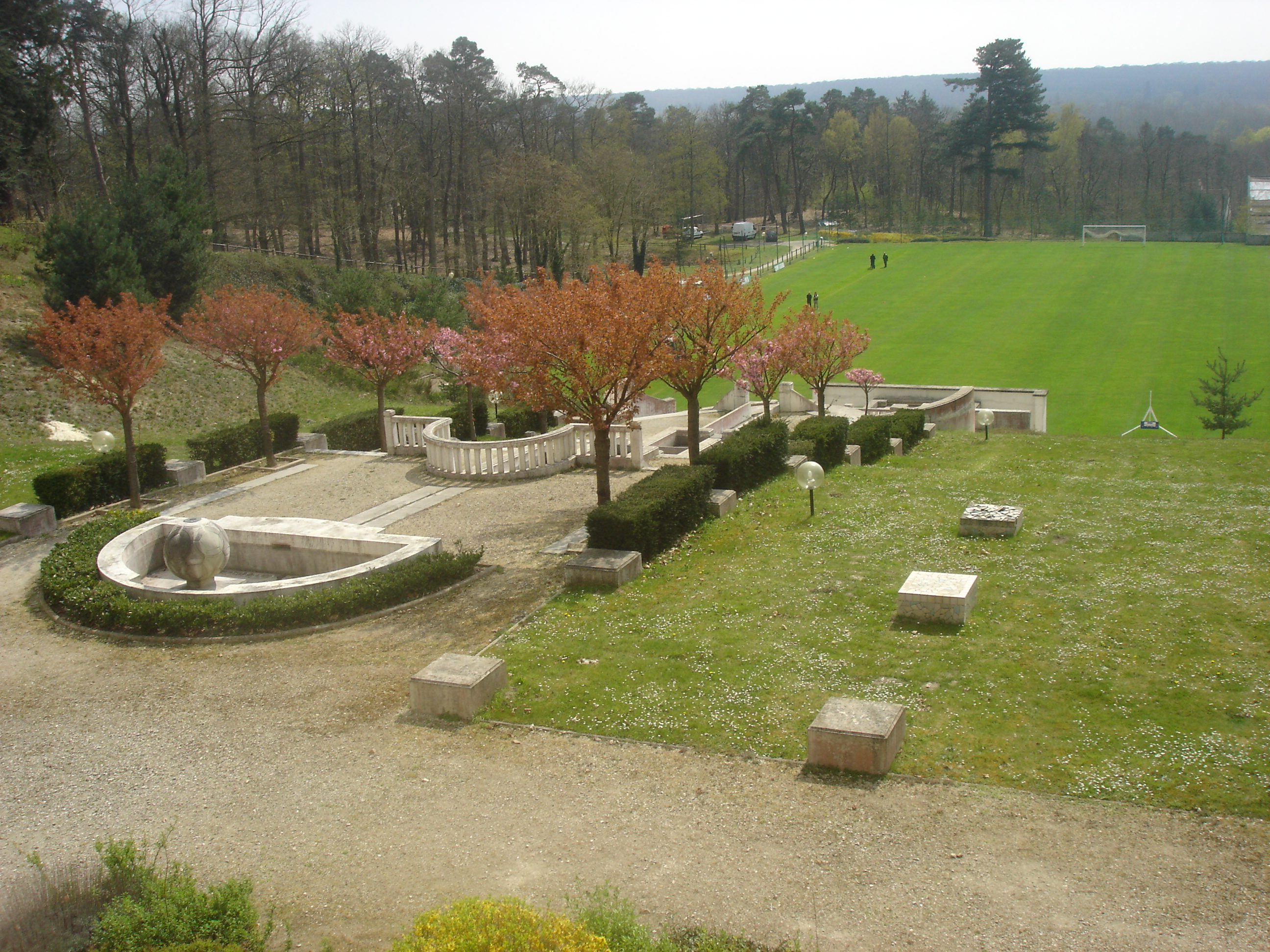

== See also ==
- CNFE Clairefontaine
- INF Vichy
- Aimé Jacquet
- Gérard Houllier
- PEF Ploufragan
- France national football team
