= French Football Federation =

Governing body of association football in France

UEFA
- Short name: FFF, 3F, Triple F
- Founded: 7 April 1919; 107 years ago
- Headquarters: 87 Bd de Grenelle, 75015 Paris, France
- FIFA affiliation: 1904 (USFSA); 1907 (CFI); 1919
- UEFA affiliation: 15 June 1954; 72 years ago
- President: Philippe Diallo
- Website: fff.fr (in French)

The French Football Federation (abbr. FFF and 3F; or Triple F; French: Fédération Française de Football, pronounced [fedeʁɑsjɔ̃ fʁɑ̃sɛːz də futbol]) is the governing body of football in France. It was formed in 1919 and is based in the capital, Paris. The FFF is a founding member of FIFA and is responsible for overseeing all aspects of the game of football in France, both professional and amateur. The French Football Federation is a founding member of UEFA and joined FIFA in 1907 after replacing the USFSA, who were founding members.

== History ==
=== Background ===
Before the FFF was established, football, rugby union and others sports in France were regulated by the Union des Sociétés Françaises de Sports Athlétiques (USFSA). Founded in November 1890, the USFSA was initially headquartered in Paris but its membership soon expanded to include sports clubs from throughout France.

In 1894, the USFSA also organised the first recognised French football championship. The first competition featured just four Paris teams and was organised on a knockout basis.

In 1900, the USFSA sent players from Parisian Club Français to represent France at the 1900 Summer Olympics. On 1 May 1904 the USFSA also selected the first official France national football team. The USFSA would be dissolved in 1919 after some disagreements with FIFA.

=== Formation and evolution ===
The Fédération Française de Football was formed on 7 April 1919 following the transformation of the Comité Français Interfédéral (CFI) into the Fédération Française de Football Association (FFFA). The CFI were seen as a rival organization to the Union des Sociétés Françaises de Sports Athlétiques (USFSA) due to the organization's constantly disagreeing with each other, mainly due to the latter's opposition to professionalism in sport. Following the debacle at the 1908 Summer Olympics, in which France sent two teams, one controlled by the USFSA and another by FIFA, the CFI ruled that FIFA would now be responsible for the club's appearances in forthcoming Olympic Games and not the USFSA. Being a founding member of the International Olympic Committee (IOC), the USFSA disagreed with the ruling and, despite having three years to reach an agreement, the CFI and the USFSA failed to, which led to France not sending a football team to the 1912 Summer Olympics. The USFSA later developed friction with FIFA and the IOC, which led to disorganization and in 1913, became semi-affiliated with the CFI.

On 7 April 1919 the CFI transformed themselves into the Fédération Française de Football with Jules Rimet being installed as the federation's first president. Its legal status is placed under the French Association loi de 1901 jurisdiction (Voluntary association). The FFF has been affiliated to FIFA since 1907, when the CFI succeeded the USFSA as France's representative. Two years later after the CFI's transformation, the USFSA officially merged with the federation.

=== Modern day ===
On 28 June 2010, the federation's current president, Jean-Pierre Escalettes, announced his resignation from his position effective 23 July. On 23 July, Fernand Duchaussoy was installed as the federation's interim president and, on 18 December, the title was removed making him the federation's 11th president in its history. On 18 June 2011, following as election, Nöel Le Graët was named as the federation's 12th president. The FFF announced to file a complaint with FIFA over racist and discriminatory remarks made by Argentina players in post-match chants after their Copa América win. The incident involved Enzo Fernández, who posted a video where players appeared to sing about French players of African heritage. Wesley Fofana condemned the video as "uninhibited racism." Philippe Diallo condemned the remarks and planned to contact Argentina's football federation and FIFA. Gianni Infantino had previously committed to a zero tolerance approach to racism.

== Activities ==
The French Football Federation describes itself in these four roles:

- To organize, develop, and monitor the teachings and practices of football in all its forms on the mainland and in the overseas regions and territories.
- To create and maintain a link between its individual members, affiliated clubs, and their respective districts and regional leagues of the Ligue du Football Amateur (LFA) and the Ligue de Football Professionnel (LFP).
- To defend the moral and material interests of French football.
- To maintain all appropriate relations with foreign associations affiliated with FIFA, as well as their sporting organizations and national governments.

The FFF sanctions all competitive football matches in France, either directly, beginning with the Championnat National on down, or indirectly through the Ligue de Football Professionnel, who manage Ligue 1 and Ligue 2, the first and second divisions of France, respectively, as well as the Coupe de la Ligue. The LFP, however, still operate under the authority of the federation. The federation is also responsible for appointing the management of the men's, women's and youth national football teams. In 2010, the FFF had 2,107,924 licenses, with over 1,800,000 registered players and 18,000 registered clubs. The federation unveiled its new crest (above right) in 2007.

The French Football Federation runs numerous competitions, the most famous of which is the annual Coupe de France. The Coupe de France is managed under the authority of the Federal Commission of the Coupe de France, which is directly attached to the Federal Council of the FFF. The federation also organizes the championships of the semi-professional and amateur leagues, such as the Championnat National, the Championnat de France amateur and Championnat de France amateur 2, and the regional and departmental leagues, as well as the latter's cup competitions.

The federation also governs youth leagues, such as the Championnat National of the under-19s and under-17s. The FFF also oversee the organization of the Coupe Gambardella and the Coupe Nationale for the under-15 and under-13 club teams. The federation organizes all three divisions of women's football in France and oversee the Challenge de France, the women's premier cup competition.

== Regional associations ==
The FFF is divided into 20 regional associations, corresponding to the 18 regions of France (13 mainland and 5 overseas), plus two overseas collectivities (Saint Martin and Saint Pierre and Miquelon). Another overseas collectivity, Saint Barthélemy, has its own territorial committee but is recognized as a district of the Guadeloupe regional association. French Polynesia and New Caledonia are members of FIFA in their own right and do not have regional bodies within the FFF. Wallis and Futuna is the only inhabited territory of France to not have organized football at any level.

Regional associations are responsible for organizing all competitions below Level 5 in the French league system. The number of regional associations was reduced by nine after the 2016 redrawing of regions in France.

=== Mainland France ===
Region	Association
Auvergne-Rhône-Alpes	Ligue Auvergne-Rhône-Alpes de football
Bourgogne-Franche-Comté	Ligue de Bourgogne-Franche-Comté de football
Brittany	Ligue de Bretagne de football
Centre-Val de Loire	Ligue du Centre-Val de Loire de football
Corsica	Ligue Corse de football
Grand Est	Ligue du Grand Est de football
Hauts-de-France	Ligue de Football des Hauts-de-France
Île-de-France	Ligue de Paris Île-de-France de football
Normandy	Ligue de football de Normandie
Nouvelle-Aquitaine	Ligue de football Nouvelle-Aquitaine
Occitanie	Ligue de football d'Occitanie
Pays de la Loire	Ligue de football des Pays de la Loire
Provence-Alpes-Côte d'Azur	Ligue de la Méditerranée de football

=== Overseas France ===
Region/Collectivity	Association
French Guiana	Ligue de football de la Guyane
Guadeloupe and Saint Barthélemy	Ligue guadeloupéenne de football
Martinique	Ligue de football de la Martinique
Mayotte	Ligue mahoraise de football
Reunion	Ligue réunionnaise de football
Saint Martin	Ligue de football de Saint-Martin
Saint Pierre and Miquelon	Ligue de football de Saint Pierre et Miquelon

== Executive committee ==
Member	Role	Notes
Philippe Diallo	President	
Brigitte Henriques	Deputy Vice-President	
Laura Georges	General secretary	
Philippe Diallo	Treasurer	
Jean-Michel Aulas	Member	
Éric Borghini	Member	
Albert Gemmrich	Member	
Hélène Schrub	Member	
Marc Keller	Member	
Philippe Lafrique	Member	
Pascal Parent	Member	
Jamel Sandjak	Member	
Marc Debarbat	President of the Amateur Football League	
Vincent Labrune	President of the Professional Football League	

== Academies ==
The French Football Force operates 14 élite academies throughout the country of France, the most famous being the INF Clairefontaine, which was created by former FFF president Fernand Sastre in 1976. Located 50 km southwest of Paris in Clairefontaine-en-Yvelines, the academy has acquired a high reputation for producing several well known French players including Nicolas Anelka, Louis Saha, William Gallas and former national team top scorer Thierry Henry.

=== Registration ===
Players selected to an academy must be at least 13 years of age, have French nationality (rule valid until 2010), and be living and playing within the region of the academy the player is registering for. Registration for new players at an academy normally begins in October the year before players enroll at the academy when prospective applicants are 12 years of age. Players have until December to register with their club for acceptance into the academy. The first set of trials are carried out by each district within its respective region. Each district selects a set number of players who will travel to the region's academy to attend a tryout, which is usually held over a three-day period. The dates of the tryouts vary depending on the academy. The Clairefontaine academy normally hold its tryouts during the Easter school holidays, however the academy in Châteauroux holds its tryouts in June. After the three days, the academy director and officials will convene to select a maximum of 22 players with three or four of the 22 being goalkeepers. The number of players selected also vary depending on the academy.

=== Training and accommodation ===
Players who are selected to attend an academy stay and train at the facilities from Monday through Friday. Players are given the weekend off to go and visit family and, also, to train and play with their parent clubs. They are given school holidays off, as well. Players are also required to meet educational criteria. For example, players age 13–15 training at Clairefontaine attend the Collège Catherine de Vivonne de Rambouilet in Rambouillet. After departing Rambouilet, players enroll at the nearby high school Lycée Louis Bascan de Rambouillet with hopes that they will earn their Baccalauréat. All costs required to attend an academy are borne by the federation and the Ligue Nationale de Football.

Academy	Location	Notes
CREPS de Aquitaine	Talence	Trains players exclusively brought up in Aquitaine.
Centre de Préformation de Football	Liévin	Trains players exclusively brought up in Nord-Pas-de-Calais.
Pôle Espoir de Castelmaurou	Castelmaurou	Trains players exclusively brought up in the Midi-Pyrénées.
INF Clairefontaine	Clairefontaine-en-Yvelines	Trains players exclusively brought up in Île-de-France.
IFR Châteauroux	Châteauroux	Trains players exclusively brought up in Centre.
Pôle Espoir de Dijon	Dijon	Trains players exclusively brought up in Burgundy.
Pôle Espoir de la Guadeloupe	Guadeloupe	Trains players exclusively brought up in the French Caribbean
Pôle Espoir de Marseille	Marseille	Trains players exclusively brought up in and around Méditerranée.
PEF Ploufragan	Ploufragan	Trains players exclusively brought up in Brittany.
CREPS de Reims	Reims	Trains players exclusively brought up in Champagne-Ardenne.
CREPS La Réunion	Réunion	Trains players exclusively brought up in Réunion and nearby territories.
PEF Saint-Sébastien-sur-Loire	Saint-Sébastien-sur-Loire	Trains players exclusively brought up in Pays de la Loire.
Pôle Espoir de Vichy	Vichy	Trains players exclusively brought up in Auvergne.

== Honours ==
=== Men ===
- FIFA World Cup

- Winner (2): 1998, 2018
- Runners-up (2): 2006, 2022
- Third place (2): 1958, 1986
- Fourth place (2): 1982, 2026

- UEFA European Championship

- Winner (2): 1984, 2000
- Runner-up (1): 2016
- Semi-final (2): 1996, 2024
- Fourth place (1): 1960

- UEFA Nations League

- Winner (1): 2020–21
- Third place (1): 2025

- Olympic Games

- Gold Medal (1): 1984
- Silver Medal (1): 2024
- Bronze Medal (1): 1900

- Artemio Franchi Trophy (or Intercontinental Cup of Nations)

- Winners: 1985

- FIFA Confederations Cup

- Winner (2): 2001, 2003

=== Women ===
- FIFA Women's World Cup

- Fourth place (1): 2011

- UEFA Women's Championship

- Semi-Final (1): 2022

- Olympic Games

- Fourth place (1): 2012

=== National youth teams ===
==== Men ====
- FIFA U-20 World Cup

- Winner (1): 2013
- Fourth place (1): 2011

- FIFA U-17 World Cup

- Winner (1): 2001
- Third place (1): 2019

- UEFA U-21 Championship

- Winner (1): 1988
- Runner-up (1): 2002
- Third place (1): 1996
- Fourth place (1): 1994
- Semi-final (2): 2006, 2019

- UEFA U-19/18 Championship (U-19 since 2002)

- Winner (8): 1949, 1983, 1996, 1997, 2000, 2005, 2010, 2016
- Runner-up (3): 1950, 1968, 2013
- Third place (3): 1957, 1958, 1981
- Fourth place (4): 1967, 1970, 1976, 1979
- Semi-final (6): 2007, 2009, 2012, 2015, 2018, 2019

== Esports ==
The French Football Federation fields teams for the FIFAe World Cup, having participated in FIFA, Rocket League and EFootball. On 19 December 2025, France’s Rocket League team, composed of Alexis ‘zen’ Bernier, Axel ‘Vatira’ Touret, Charles ‘juicy’ Sabiani and coach Victor ‘Ferra’ Francal, won the 2025 edition in Riyadh, having beaten hdefending champions Saudi Arabia 4-2 in the final. To qualify, the team also emerged victorious in the 2025 European Regional, beating Germany 4-1 in the final. Previously, they finished as runners-up in 2024.

== Sponsors ==
=== Current ===
- Nike, Inc.
- Crédit Agricole
- Électricité de France
- Volkswagen
- Uber Eats
- KFC
- Betclic
- Panini
- Intermarché
- Coca-Cola

=== Previous ===
- Ferrero
- Carrefour
- Citroën
- Engie
- Toyota
- Belin
- Carambar
- SFR
- Continental AG
- France Loisirs
- RTL
- Brioche Pasquier
- Air France
- LU
- Eurocard
- Archos
- Sport 2000
- PMU
- L'Oréal
- La Poste
- Poulain
- TF1

== See also ==
- Union des Sociétés Françaises de Sports Athlétiques, FFF predecessor
- Gymnastic and Sports Federation of French Patronages
