= SOS Amitié =

- Formation: 1960; 66 years ago
- Headquarters: Paris
- Location: Île-de-France
- Region served: France
- Website: www.sos-amitie.org

SOS Amitié is a French federation of several regional charitable organizations aimed at providing emotional support to anyone in emotional distress, struggling to cope, or at risk of suicide throughout France, often through their telephone helpline. This helps people with their mental state and how they cope with life, this helps them regain their happiness and helps them fight off the worries and support them in every way in form of their state of their personal life.

== History ==
The first association was created in France in 1960 in Boulogne-Billancourt, following the meeting of philanthropist Georges Lillaz with Pastor Jean Casalis and his wife, the first listeners of the SOS Amitié Île-de-France website, choosing secularism in 1970. It received 7,500 calls in the first year. The federation was recognized as a public utility by a decree on February 15, 1967.

This concept of charitable organization originated in Great Britain under the name "The Samaritans" following the suicide of a 14-year-old English girl who thought she had contracted a sexually transmitted infection when she was actually menstruating. Reverend Chad Varah then placed an advertisement in The Times on November 2, 1953: "Before you commit suicide, call me at M.A.N. 90.00", inventing the world's first telephone listening service to help those contemplating suicide, the desperate, isolated individuals, and anyone who felt unheard by others.

== Operation ==
Now receiving over 700,000 calls per year, with just over a tenth of them in the Paris region, more than 1,700 volunteers take turns 24/7, 365 days a year to ensure continuous listening (approximately 400,000 hours). The service is free, anonymous, confidential, and the dialogue is non-directive. Independent of any political or religious movement, the organization operates thanks to subsidies from public authorities, donations from individuals or entities, and patronage.

Fifty local organizations, spread across metropolitan France, including eight in the Île-de-France region, are grouped within the Federation SOS Amitié France.

== On the Internet ==
In addition to telephone listening, SOS Amitié has established an online listening service via instant messaging in a web interface, following the same rules and ethics as over the phone. A chat dialogue is available every day between 1:00 PM and 3:00 AM, using a shared tool with Télé Accueil. A messaging system is available for individuals, with a response time of 48 hours.

SOS Amitié Internet is an organization founded under the 1901 law and affiliated with the Federation SOS Amitié France. The organization recruits and provides specific training for a team of listeners who already have experience in telephone listening at SOS Amitié.

== Participation in INPES Action ==
As part of the improvement of the remote prevention and assistance in health (PADS) initiative initiated in 2011 by the National Institute for Prevention and Health Education (INPES), SOS Amitié and 16 other organizations have developed their websites and worked together to improve the training of listeners. Some of these training programs are shared. For example, at the end of 2011, listeners from these organizations met and received a weekend of training.

== Pop Culture ==
The action of the movie "Le Père Noël est une ordure" takes place within an organization inspired by SOS Amitié on Christmas Eve.

== French Bibliography ==
Dupont, Sébastien. Face à la solitude existentielle de l’individu contemporain : les atouts de SOS Amitié, Revue SOS Amitié, 2010, no 143, p. 24-27.

Ferrand-Bechmann, Dan, Dir. Sicard, Didier, Préf.. L'écoute, au cœur du métier bénévole. Ed Chronique Sociale, 2020. 131 p.

Reboul, Pierre, Dir., Comte-Sponville, André, Préf. Sortir du silence : L'écoute à S.O.S Amitié . Ed Chronique Sociale, 2016. 208 p.

Sacco, Francesca. La magie de l'écoute : Entretiens avec des bénévoles de La Main Tendue et de SOS Amitié. Georg Editeur, 2019. 224 p.

== See also ==
Suicide Prevention

Suicide
