= Jean-Michel Goudard =

French businessman (1939–2020)

- Born: 13 November 1939; Montpellier, France
- Died: 6 November 2020 (aged 80)
- Occupation: PR consultant

Jean-Michel Goudard (13 November 1939 – 6 November 2020) was a French Public relations consultant, who was the President and Chairman of the board of BBDO Paris.

== Biography ==
Goudard was born in Montpellier, France on 13 November 1939. He graduated from HEC Business School in 1962, became a Navy Officer in 1964, and brand manager at Procter and Gamble in 1965, managing director of Young and Rubicam in France in 1970, he created with Bernard Roux, Jacques Seguela and Alain Cayzac the advertising agency RSCG (Roux Seguele Cayzac Goudard) which grew into an international network agency. Goudard was also a hobbyist bullfighter.

Together with Bernard Brochand, he made the winning campaign of Jacques Chirac and his Gaullist party RPR "Oui à la France qui gagne" in 1978. He did it again in 1986 with the campaign "Vivement Demain". The same year, he published his book "Je vous salue fiascos" (Jean-Claude Lattes) about his own fiascos in advertising. In 1988, Jacques Chirac, then Prime Minister, asked him to manage his presidential campaign against François Mitterrand. In 1991, he became the president of Euro-RSCG International, covering the whole worldwide network outside France. In 1995, he managed again the presidential campaign of Jacques Chirac ("La France pour tous"), and, immediately after the election of Jacques Chirac as President of France, he left Euro-RSCG and France to live in New York City, for 10 years, as president of BBDO International. He retired in April 2006 to run the presidential campaign of Nicolas Sarkozy, and became so close to the President that he even attended the G7 summit. Goudard created the claim "Ensemble, tout devient possible" ("Together, everything becomes possible"). Immediately after Sarkozy's election, in 2007, he retired in Switzerland in Rolle (canton of Vaud). In 2008, President Sarkozy asked him to become his Chief Strategy Officer. Goudard accepted. He came back to France to work at the Elysée Palace. In 2016 Jean-Michel Goudard was indicted in the affair of the polls of the Elysée for his work with Nicolas Sarkozy.
