= Daniel Hechter =

French fashion designer (born 1938)

- Born: 30 July 1938 (age 88); Paris, France
- Occupation: Fashion designer
- Known for: Inventor of ready-to-wear President of Paris Saint-Germain F.C. (1974–1978)

Daniel Hechter (born 30 July 1938) is a French fashion designer. He was also the president of Paris Saint-Germain F.C. from 1974 to 1978, and designed the club's home shirt.

== Personal life ==
Daniel Hechter was born in Paris, France, in a family who owned a ready-to-wear company. As such, Hechter was brought up in an environment sympathetic to fashion. At the age of four, he was forced to flee from Paris with his mother and did not see his father, a prisoner of war, until he was seven. He married Marika Hechter; they have a daughter, Hechter then married Jennifer Chambon in 1980. He served in the French Army from 1958 to 1960.

== Career ==
Hechter completed his secondary education and worked as a storekeeper to a fashion house until 1949. By 1956, Louis Féraud and Jacques Esterel were selling Hechter's designs, and he worked for designer Pierre d'Alby from 1958. Hechter founded the Daniel Hechter Company in 1962 with friend Armand Ornstein. Hechter opened a boutique in 1962, and became known for sporty casual wear. His stated goal was to offer wearable yet high-quality, creative fashion for a wide range of consumer groups. Over time he expanded his company, developing it into an international label that encompasses seven different collections. Brigitte Bardot helped bring his designs to a wider audience when she wore one of his outfits in La Parisienne.

In 1966 he worked with Scott Paper Company to make a dress out of nonwoven paper achieving attention as an avant-garde work.

He is one of the first designers to produce clothing ranges for skiing and tennis, in 1971.

In 1989, he launched his first line of perfume.

He entered politics and sat on the Marseille regional council starting in 1992.

In 1997, he retired to Geneva, Switzerland, and he was elected vice president of the Etoile-Carouge soccer club. His novel Le Boss was published in 2000.

=== Football ===
Hechter was a financial contributor in the early years of the football team Paris Saint-Germain (PSG) and was president of the management committee from 15 June 1973 to 9 June 1974, and then president from 9 June 1974 to 6 January 1978. He also designed PSG new home colours, known as the "Hechter shirt". He left the presidency of the PSG following the scandal of double ticketing at the Parc des Princes. He designed the streetwear for the French football team in 1998.
