= Sport 2000 (retailer) =

European sporting goods retail chain cooperative

SPORT 2000 Group International
- Company type: GmbH
- Industry: Services, wholesale and foreign trade, sports retailers
- Founded: 1998
- Headquarters: Mainhausen, Germany
- Key people: Margit Gosau (managing director)
- Revenue: €4.9 billion (2024)
- Website: www.sport2000international.com

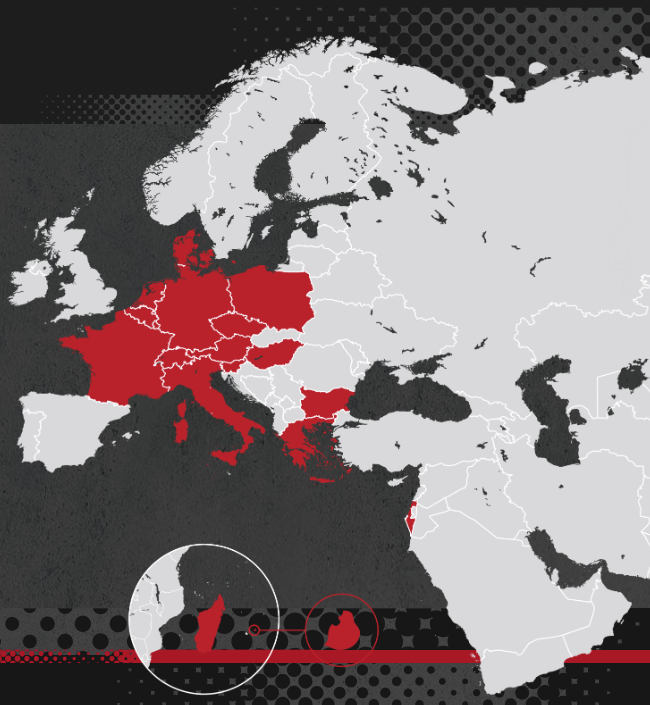
Countries with Sport 2000 activities, as of 2025

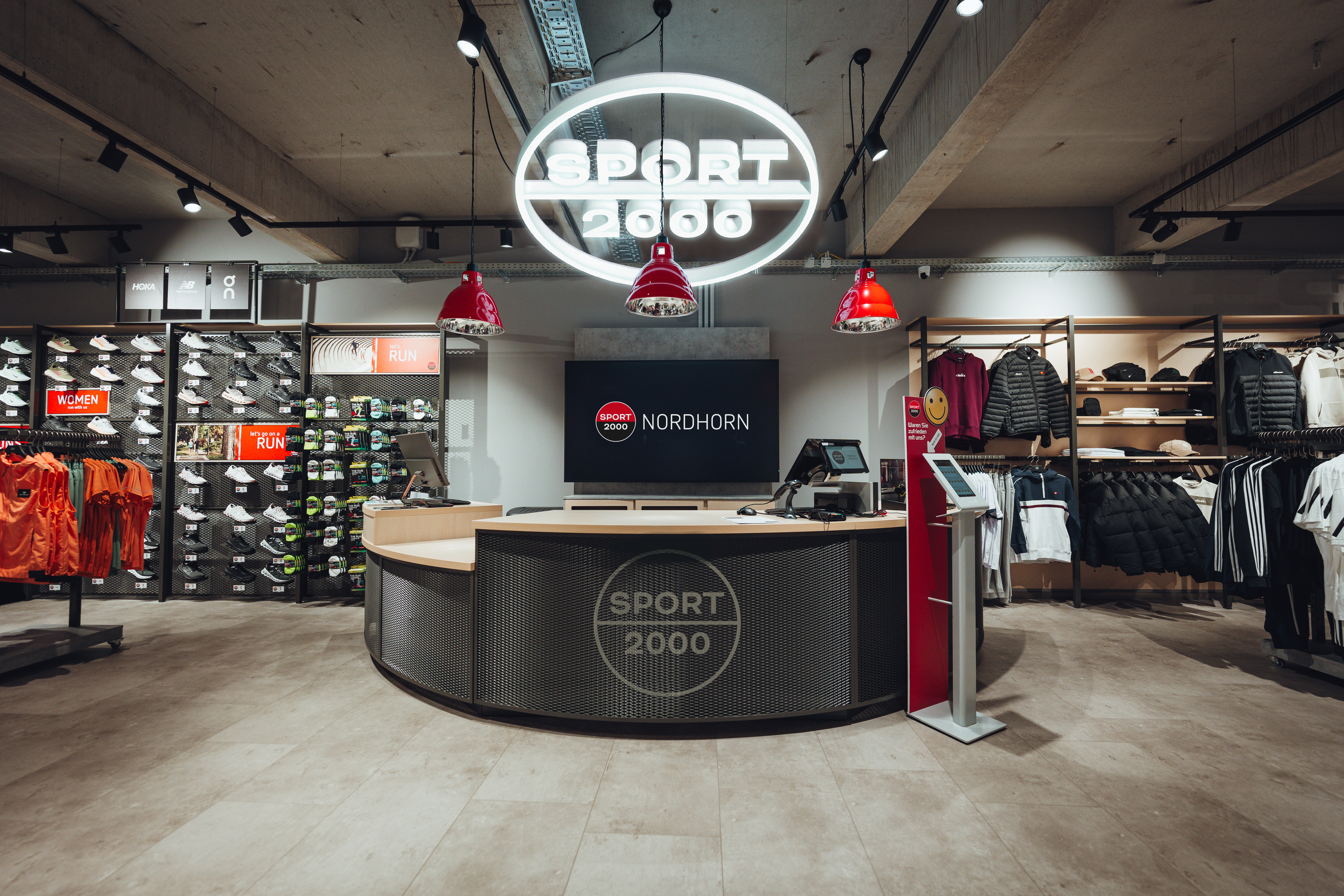
A Sport 2000 shop in Nordhorn, Germany

Sport 2000 Group International, headquartered in Mainhausen, Germany, is an internationally active sports purchasing and marketing cooperative. It is the umbrella organization of the Sport 2000 Group and is responsible for developing the brand of the same name. In the 2024 financial year, the group generated sales of €4.9 billion with 2,930 stores across 17 countries.

== History ==
=== Foundation of the purchasing cooperatives ===
Sport 2000 has its origins in various cooperative groups. The history of the group began in 1966 with the merger of 36 French retailers under the Sport 2000 cooperative. Over the years, several stores joined this cooperative, and new Sport 2000 stores and companies were established, such as Sport 2000 Spain in 1977 and Sport 2000 Netherlands. In 1972, sporting goods retailers in Austria came together under the name Zentralgruppe Einkauf, which later became ZentraSport Österreich and subsequently Sport 2000 Österreich. In Germany, four retailers founded Fach-Sport GmbH in 1979, which later became Sport 2000 Deutschland, the predecessor of Sport 2000 GmbH.

=== Sport 2000 International ===
In 1988, Golden Team International AG was founded in Ittigen, Switzerland, as an association of international sporting goods retailers. Its members included retailers from Canada, Denmark, Finland, the Netherlands, Italy, Norway, Sweden, Switzerland, Austria, Germany, and the United States, among them the Austrian ZentraSport (Sport 2000 Österreich) as a founding member. In 1993, Fach-Sport GmbH also joined Golden Team International AG.

In the fall of 1994, Golden Team International was transformed into Sport 2000 International AG, headquartered in Ittigen, which was intended to unite Sport 2000 companies and stores from various countries under one cooperative structure. At the time of its founding, this included Sport 2000 Spain and the Netherlands. The following year, the German and French Sport 2000 organizations also joined. Between 1997 and 1998, Sport 2000 International GmbH, the umbrella organization of the Sport 2000 Group, was established, and Sport 2000 International AG relocated its headquarters to Mainhausen, Germany.

In 2005, Sport 2000 International AG was renamed Sport 2000 International Marketing AG. The organization was again renamed in 2024 and is now called Sport 2000 Group International.

=== Expansion ===
Starting in 2000, Sport 2000 increasingly entered new markets. In 2005, Sport 2000 International granted licensing and market rights for the neighboring markets of the Czech Republic, Slovakia, and Hungary to Sport 2000 Österreich. In the following years, particularly in 2008, the group expanded through the addition of new stores in Eastern Europe.

In 2017, further licensing partnerships were established with retailers from Hungary, Spain, Belgium, and the Middle East, including the Hungarian sporting goods wholesaler Smart 73, the Base Trademark DetallSport Group based in Barcelona, and the Falaknaz Sports Group, founded in 1955 in Dubai. With the partnership in Dubai, Sport 2000 became active outside Europe for the first time.

In spring 2023, the sale of sports apparel and equipment under the private label Witeblaze began. This brand also replaced all previous private labels of Sport 2000. In the same year, Sport 2000, together with the Mauritian company HV Group, opened several stores in Mauritius for the first time.

== Organization ==
Sport 2000 Group International is the umbrella organization of the Sport 2000 Group, which includes around 2,930 stores in 17 countries. In the 2024 financial year, the group achieved external turnover of €4.9 billion. Sport 2000 Group International is headed by Margit Gosau, who also manages Sport 2000 GmbH together with Dominik Solleder.

The responsibilities of Sport 2000 Group International include developing the Sport 2000 brand for sporting goods retailers. This involves coordinating retailers, internationally marketing private labels, and granting licensing and brand rights.

Sport 2000 operates a mix of store types, from general sporting goods retailers to niche shops concentrating on different areas like team sports, outdoor, running, sportstyle, or winter sports. In addition to its own label Witeblaze, brands distributed by Sport 2000 International include Puma, Ellesse, Hummel, Oakley, Speedo, The North Face, Atomic, and Odlo.

The Sport 2000 cooperative also operates the Absolute stores: Absolute TeamSport, a concept for retailers in the team sports sector, and Absolute Run, for retailers in the running sector. These stores provide service and customer consultation, while Sport 2000 takes on business activities such as assortment planning and marketing.

== Sport 2000 GmbH ==
SPORT 2000 GmbH
- Company type: GmbH
- Industry: Services, wholesale and foreign trade, sports retailers
- Founded: 1988
- Headquarters: Mainhausen, Germany
- Key people: Dominik Solleder, Margit Gosau
- Number of employees: 102 (2023)
- Website: www.sport2000.de/

Sport 2000 GmbH, as a seven-country cooperative, is part of the Sport 2000 brand and operates as a retail organization in Germany, Switzerland, Belgium, Luxembourg, the Netherlands, Austria, and the Czech Republic. The company is headquartered in Mainhausen, Germany. It belongs to the European retail cooperative ANWR Group. In Germany, Sport 2000 encompasses 1,500 stores operated by nearly 1,000 specialist retailers. The external turnover of the cooperative amounted to €4.04 billion in 2024.

Since 2019, the company has operated under the name Sport 2000 GmbH; prior to that, it was Sport 2000 Deutschland GmbH.

Sport 2000 GmbH provides services to affiliated retailers in various areas. These primarily include negotiating centralized purchasing conditions with suppliers in the sporting goods industry and supplying goods to different groups of retailers, including both specialist and wholesale dealers, but also services in the area of digital transformation. It is a subsidiary of Europe's largest retail cooperative, the ANWR Group.

=== Austria ===
Sport 2000 Österreich is a retail service organization in the Austrian sporting goods sector and has been part of the German ANWR Group eG since June 2024. Operational responsibility lies with ANWR Sports GmbH. The roots of Sport 2000 Österreich go back to 1972, when ZentraSport Österreich e.Gen. was founded by ten sporting goods retailers.

Sport 2000 Österreich is headquartered in Ohlsdorf and serves as a platform for exchange between industry, specialist retailers, and customers. It provides services for its partner companies in areas such as assortment design, marketing, digitalization, and strategic planning. The retailer network comprises 150 independent sporting goods retailers across Austria. In addition, Sport 2000 Österreich also supports retailers in the Czech Republic.

Another business area of Sport 2000 Österreich is rental services. A ski rental system was established in 2000 under the brand Sport 2000 rent, which in 2001 was awarded the Austrian State Prize for Marketing. Online bicycle rental was also introduced in 2015.
