= Fernand Sastre =

French football executive (1923–1998)

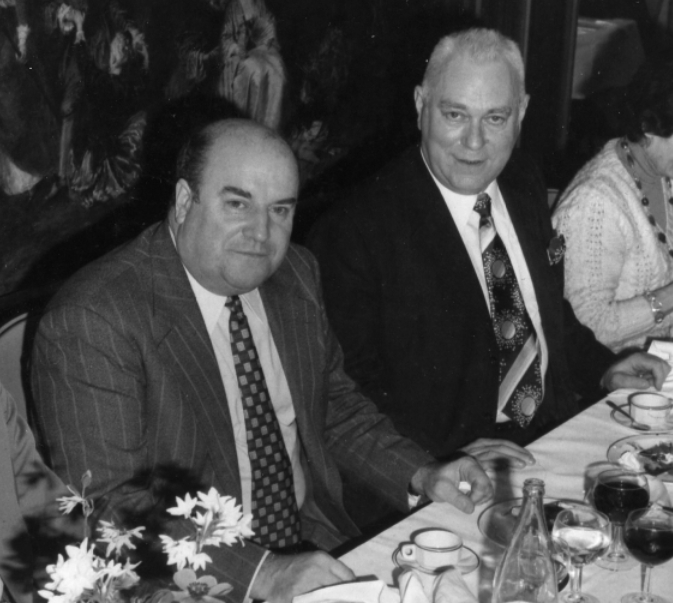
- Fernand Sastre (left)

President of the French Football Federation
- In office 1972–1984
- Preceded by: Jacques Georges
- Succeeded by: Jean Fournet-Fayard

Personal details
- Born: 1 October 1923 Kouba, French Algeria
- Died: 13 June 1998 (aged 74) France
- Occupation: Association football executive

Fernand Sastre (1 October 1923 – 13 June 1998) was a French football official who was President of the French Football Federation from 1972 to 1984.

The Le Centre Technique National Fernand Sastre, better known as Clairefontaine, is named after him. He died right after three days when the 1998 FIFA World Cup began to roll at his homeland. Following France's World Cup victory later, the French squad dedicated the victory to him for his role of developing French football.

He was awarded the FIFA Order of Merit in 1998, the year of his death.
