= Pierre-Étienne Guyot =

French sports executive (1905–1985)

- Born: 21 May 1905; Paris, France
- Died: 13 October 1985 (aged 80); Paris, France
- Occupation: Sports executive

Pierre-Étienne Guyot (21 May 1905 – 13 October 1985) was a French sports executive. He notably was president of the French Golf Federation from 1970 to 1981, president of the Fédération Internationale de Tir aux Armes Sportives de Chasse from 1972 to 1981, vice president of Racing Club de France, president of Paris Saint-Germain from 1970 to 1971, and president of Paris FC from 1969 to 1970 and 1972 to 1973.

== Paris FC and Paris Saint-Germain ==
In the summer of 1970, Guyot was collaborating with Guy Crescent and Henri Patrelle to form a new football club. Eventually, it was agreed upon that Guyot and Crescent's virtual Paris FC would merge with Patrelle's Stade Saint-Germain to form Paris Saint-Germain. Guyot became the first president of the newly-founded club. However, he was succeeded in this role after one year by Crescent. In 1972, PSG split into two, and PFC was re-formed; Guyot subsequently returned to preside the club for one year.

== Bibliography ==
- Fédération française de golf Guide Fédéral 1976, Pierre-Étienne Guyot, F.F.G
