= Francis Graille =

French businessman and executive (born 1955)

- Born: 25 April 1955 (age 70); Le Puy-en-Velay, France
- Occupations: Businessman, executive

Francis Graille (born 25 April 1955) is a French businessman and executive. He has worked for various media companies, and served as the president of professional football clubs Lille OSC, Paris Saint-Germain FC, and AJ Auxerre.

== Career ==
In 1982, Graille began his career working as a local correspondent for news agency Agence France-Presse in his native Le Puy-en-Velay. In 1986, he became a regional manager at radio station NRJ, before discovering the world of television with Télé Lyon Métropole. Graille would go on to found Concept TV and Visual TV, two television production companies.

From 1999 to 2002, Graille worked as the co-president of football club Lille OSC, in association with Luc Dayan. From 2003 to 2005, he was the president of Paris Saint-Germain FC.

In 2006, Graille started working in film production by founding Holi Films. In 2007, he became an executive at Sportfive, which had been recently acquired by Lagardère Group. He was in charge of the company's media branch, and specialized in the promotion of TV rights. He left Sportfive in 2009.

In June 2010, Graille received an eight-month suspended sentence and a €20,000 fine for illegal transfer dealings during his time as the president of Paris Saint-Germain. His predecessor Laurent Perpère was also convicted.

On 17 May 2017, Graille became the president of football club AJ Auxerre, as a representative of Chinese majority owner ORG Technology. He left in May 2021, and was replaced by James Zhou, the owner of ORG Technology.
