= Alain Cayzac =

French advertising agent

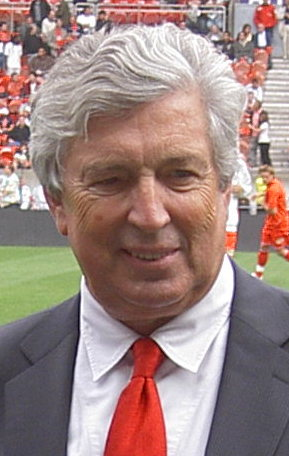
- Born: 2 June 1941 (age 84); Évreux, France
- Education: HEC Paris
- Occupation: Businessman

Alain Cayzac, born in Évreux, Eure on 2 June 1941 is a French advertising agent and was the president of the Paris Saint-Germain Football Club between June 2006 and April 2008.

A graduate of HEC Paris, Alain Cayzac began his career as an advertising agent in 1969, before co-founding in 1972 the agency RSCG with Bernard Roux, Jacques Séguéla, and Jean-Michel Goudard. He became the president in 1984, a post he retained after the merger with Eurocom in 1992. He later became the vice-president of Havas in 1997. He left Havas in 2005.

A member of the directors' committee of Paris Saint-Germain since 1986, he became a minority shareholder (2%) from 1991 to 2005, then the president in June 2006. He resigned in April 2008 after the club suffered poor results, escaping relegation on the last day of the 2007-2008 football season.
