= Castelmaurou =

- Commune
- Town hall

- Coat of arms
- Location of Castelmaurou
- Location within France Location within Occitanie
- Coordinates: 43°40′40″N 1°31′56″E
- Country: France
- Region: Occitania
- Department: Haute-Garonne
- Arrondissement: Toulouse
- Canton: Pechbonnieu
- Intercommunality: Coteaux-Bellevue

Government
  - Mayor (2020–2026): Diane Esquerre
- Area^{1}: 16.77 km^{2} (6.47 sq mi)
- Elevation: 223 m (732 ft)
- Highest elevation: 231 m (758 ft)
- Lowest elevation: 132 m (433 ft)
- Population (2023): 4,524
  - Density: 269.8/km^{2} (698.7/sq mi)
- Time zone: UTC+01:00 (CET)
  - Summer (DST): UTC+02:00 (CEST)
- INSEE/Postal code: 31117 /31180
- ^{1} French Land Register data, which excludes lakes, ponds, glaciers > 1 km^{2} (0.386 sq mi or 247 acres) and river estuaries.

Castelmaurou (French pronunciation: [kastɛlmoʁu]; Occitan: Castèlmauron) is a commune in the Haute-Garonne department in southwestern France.

== Population ==
Historical population
Year	Pop.	±% p.a.
1968	918	—
1975	1,458	+6.83%
1982	1,611	+1.44%
1990	2,849	+7.39%
1999	3,261	+1.51%
2007	3,398	+0.52%
2012	3,965	+3.13%
2017	4,273	+1.51%
2023	4,524	+0.96%
Source: INSEE

== See also ==
- Communes of the Haute-Garonne department
