= 1973–74 Paris Saint-Germain FC season =

4th season of Paris Saint-Germain FC

Paris Saint-Germain
1973–74 season
- President: Daniel Hechter
- Manager: Robert Vicot
- Stadium: Stade Georges Lefèvre; Parc des Princes; Stade Jean-Bouin
- Ligue 2: 2nd (promoted)
- Coupe de France: Quarter-finals
- Top goalscorer: League: Jean-Pierre Dogliani (16); All: Jean-Pierre Dogliani (17)
- Average home league attendance: 4,087
Home colours	Away colours	Third colours

The 1973–74 season was the 4th season in the history of Paris Saint-Germain FC. PSG played most of their home league matches at the Stade Georges Lefèvre, while occasionally hosting fixtures at the Parc des Princes and the Stade Jean-Bouin, attracting an average of 4,087 spectators per match. The club's president was Daniel Hechter, and the team was managed by Robert Vicot, with Jean-Pierre Dogliani serving as captain. PSG finished second in Ligue 2, achieving promotion to Ligue 1 in the play-offs, and reached the quarter-finals of the Coupe de France. Dogliani was the team's top scorer, netting 17 goals in all competitions, including 16 in the league.

== Players ==
=== Squad ===
Players who featured in at least one official match for the club.

Note: Flags indicate national team as defined under FIFA eligibility rules; some limited exceptions apply. Players may hold more than one non-FIFA nationality.

No.	Pos.	Nation	Player
—	GK	FRA	Camille Choquier
—	GK	FRA	Jacky Planchard
—	GK	FRA	Patrice Py
—	DF	FRA	Jacky Bade
—	DF	FRA	Pierre Bajoc
—	DF	FRA	Louis Cardiet
—	DF	FRA	Bernard Béreau
—	DF	FRA	Éric Renaut
—	DF	FRA	Patrice Zbinden
—	DF	FRA	Christian Quéré
—	DF	FRA	Didier Ledunois
—	MF	FRA	Jean-Louis Leonetti
—	MF	FRA	Bernard Dumot

No.	Pos.	Nation	Player
—	MF	FRA	Jacques Laposte
—	MF	FRA	Jean Deloffre
—	MF	FRA	Robin Leclerc
—	MF	FRA	Michel Llodra
—	FW	FRA	Jean-Pierre Dogliani (captain)
—	FW	BRA	Armando Monteiro
—	FW	ISR	Mordechai Spiegler
—	FW	FRA	Guy Nosibor
—	FW	TOG	Othniel Dossevi
—	FW	CGO	François M'Pelé
—	FW	FRA	Christian André
—	FW	FRA	Jean-Louis Brost
—	FW	FRA	Michel Marella

== Transfers ==
=== Arrivals ===
Players who signed for the club.

Note: Flags indicate national team as defined under FIFA eligibility rules; some limited exceptions apply. Players may hold more than one non-FIFA nationality.

No.	Pos.	Nation	Player
—	GK	FRA	Jacky Planchard (from Blois)
—	DF	FRA	Jacky Bade (from Albi)
—	DF	FRA	Pierre Bajoc (from Éclaire Rivière Salée)
—	DF	FRA	Louis Cardiet (from Rennes)
—	MF	FRA	Jean-Louis Leonetti (from Paris FC)
—	MF	FRA	Jean Deloffre (from Avignon)

No.	Pos.	Nation	Player
—	FW	FRA	Jean-Pierre Dogliani (from Monaco)
—	FW	ISR	Mordechai Spiegler (from Paris FC)
—	FW	BRA	Armando Monteiro (from Botafogo)
—	FW	CGO	François M'Pelé (from Ajaccio)
—	FW	FRA	Guy Nosibor (from Éclaire Rivière Salée)

=== Departures ===
Players who left the club.

Note: Flags indicate national team as defined under FIFA eligibility rules; some limited exceptions apply. Players may hold more than one non-FIFA nationality.

No.	Pos.	Nation	Player
—	DF	FRA	Michel Béhier (Retired)
—	DF	FRA	Bernard Lambert (Free agent)
—	DF	FRA	Claude Rivet (Free agent)
—	DF	FRA	Pascal Schmitt (to Paris FC)
—	DF	FRA	Bernard Béréau (to Fontainebleau)

No.	Pos.	Nation	Player
—	DF	FRA	Patrice Turpin (Free agent)
—	MF	FRA	Thierry Coutard (to Montluçon)
—	FW	TUN	Kamel Ben Mustapha (Lucé)
—	FW	FRA	Richard Vanquelles (Free agent)

== Kits ==
Canada Dry was the shirt sponsor, and Le Coq Sportif was the kit supplier.

Home	Away	Third

== Competitions ==
=== Overview ===
Competition	First match	Last match	Starting round	Final position	Record							
Competition	First match	Last match	Starting round	Final position	Pld	W	D	L	GF	GA	GD	Win %
Ligue 2	19 August 1973	4 June 1974	Matchday 1	2nd	36	20	6	10	75	46	+29	55.56
Coupe de France	16 December 1973	8 May 1974	Sixth round	Quarter-finals	9	6	2	1	18	13	+5	66.67
Total					45	26	8	11	93	59	+34	57.78

Source: Competitions

=== Ligue 2 ===
==== League table (Group B) ====
Pos	Team	Pld	W	D	L	GF	GA	GD	BP	Pts	Promotion or relegation
1	Red Star (P)	34	19	12	3	71	29	+42	11	61	1974–75 French Division 1 Championship play-offs
2	Paris Saint-Germain (P)	34	19	6	9	70	42	+28	13	57	1974–75 French Division 1 Promotion play-offs
3	Toulouse	34	17	5	12	64	42	+22	9	48	
4	Avignon	34	15	10	9	47	33	+14	6	46	
5	Toulon	34	15	8	11	50	39	+11	8	46	

Source: Histoire du PSG
Rules for classification: 1) points; 2) goal difference; 3) number of goals scored.
(P) Promoted

==== Results by round ====
Round	1	2	3	4	5	6	7	8	9	10	11	12	13	14	15	16	17	18	19	20	21	22	23	24	25	26	27	28	29	30	31	32	33	34
Ground	A	H	A	H	A	A	H	A	H	A	H	A	H	A	H	A	H	A	H	A	H	H	A	H	A	H	A	H	A	H	A	H	A	H
Result	W	W	W	W	L	D	W	L	D	L	W	L	W	L	W	L	W	L	W	D	W	W	L	D	D	W	W	D	L	W	W	W	W	W
Position	1	1	1	1	1	2	1	3	2	2	2	2	2	2	2	3	3	3	4	4	4	3	4	3	4	3	3	3	3	2	2	2	2	2

Source: Histoire du PSG
A = Away; H = Home; W = Win; D = Draw; L = Loss

==== Matches ====
19 August 1973 1	Béziers	1–4	Paris Saint-Germain	Béziers
	Bait 69'	Report	Dossevi 43'; André 45', 68'; Brost 88'	Stadium: Stade de Sauclières; Attendance: 1,968; Referee: René Vigliani

25 August 1973 2	Paris Saint-Germain	5–3	Toulouse	Saint-Germain-en-Laye
	Bozsik 5' (o.g.); Brost 10', 82'; Dogliani 30'; André 35'	Report	Blanchard 37'; Wojciak 43'; Augustin 66'	Stadium: Stade Georges Lefèvre; Attendance: 2,776; Referee: Achille Verbecke

1 September 1973 3	Toulon	0–1	Paris Saint-Germain	Toulon
		Report	André 38'	Stadium: Stade de Bon Rencontre; Attendance: 2,807; Referee: Julien Espié

9 September 1973 4	Paris Saint-Germain	3–2	Angoulême	Saint-Germain-en-Laye
	Dogliani 12'; Brost 30'; André 57'	Report	Kervarrec 78'; Bećirbašić 87'	Stadium: Stade Georges Lefèvre; Attendance: 2,191; Referee: André Cauchy

15 September 1973 5	Ajaccio	1–0	Paris Saint-Germain	Ajaccio
	Dossevi 18' (o.g.)	Report		Stadium: Stade François Coty; Attendance: 1,399; Referee: Ange Rancelli

23 September 1973 6	Nevers	1–1	Paris Saint-Germain	Nevers
	Derras 64' (pen.)	Report	Dossevi 27'	Stadium: Stade Louis Stévenot; Attendance: 3,777; Referee: Guy Mouchotte

29 September 1973 7	Paris Saint-Germain	1–0	Châteauroux	Saint-Germain-en-Laye
	André 55'	Report		Stadium: Stade Georges Lefèvre; Attendance: 1,702; Referee: Raymond Poncin

5 October 1973 8	Mulhouse	2–1	Paris Saint-Germain	Mulhouse
	Subiat 67'; Sanchez 77'	Report	Renaut 42'	Stadium: Stade de Bourtzwiller; Attendance: 5,174; Referee: Roger Machin

12 October 1973 9	Paris Saint-Germain	1–1	Avignon	Paris
	Brost 22'	Report	Pellegrini 47'	Stadium: Stade Jean-Bouin; Attendance: 804; Referee: Albert Lempereur

21 October 1973 10	Cannes	2–0	Paris Saint-Germain	Cannes
	Broggini 22'; Gaidoz 40'	Report		Stadium: Stade des Hespérides; Attendance: 1,802; Referee: Robert Frauciel

27 October 1973 11	Paris Saint-Germain	5–1	Gueugnon	Saint-Germain-en-Laye
	Laposte 15', 62'; Monteiro 44'; Renaut 67'; Dogliani 88'	Report	Guenot 70'	Stadium: Stade Georges Lefèvre; Attendance: 1,805; Referee: Jean-Pierre Peauger

3 November 1973 12	Sète	3–0; Awarded	Paris Saint-Germain	Sète
		Report		Stadium: Georges-Bayrou Stadium; Attendance: 2,343; Referee: Michel Kitabdjian

10 November 1973 13	Paris Saint-Germain	3–1	Red Star	Paris
	Dossevi 15'; Monteiro 56'; Deloffre 75'	Report	Combin 67' (pen.)	Stadium: Parc des Princes; Attendance: 33,872; Referee: Henri Didier

17 November 1973 14	Mantes	2–1	Paris Saint-Germain	Mantes-la-Ville
	Samper 14'; Pédini 72'	Report	Dossevi 84'	Stadium: Stade Aimé Bergeal; Attendance: 3,723; Referee: Alain Delmer

24 November 1973 15	Paris Saint-Germain	4–0	Vittel	Saint-Germain-en-Laye
	Monteiro 20'; Brost 26'; Dogliani 29', 33'	Report		Stadium: Stade Georges Lefèvre; Attendance: 1,432; Referee: Louis Dhumerelle

2 December 1973 16	Arles	3–1	Paris Saint-Germain	Arles
	Guise 21'; Exbrayat 39'; Koum 88'	Report	Dossevi 89'	Stadium: Stade Fernand-Fournier; Attendance: 743; Referee: Bernard Amiotte

9 December 1973 17	Paris Saint-Germain	2–1	Fontainebleau	Saint-Germain-en-Laye
	Dogliani 10' (pen.), 60'	Report	Viala 5'	Stadium: Stade Georges Lefèvre; Attendance: 2,428; Referee: Jean-Marie Meeus

22 December 1973 18	Toulouse	2–1	Paris Saint-Germain	Toulouse
	Augustin 13'; Wojciak 50'	Report	M'Pelé 75'	Stadium: Stadium de Toulouse; Attendance: 10,391; Referee: Ange Rancelli

20 January 1974 20	Angoulême	2–2	Paris Saint-Germain	Angoulême
	Burner 26'; Geurten 80'	Report	Monteiro 15'; Cardiet 59'	Stadium: Stade Lebon; Attendance: 2,250; Referee: Roger Mouton

27 January 1974 21	Paris Saint-Germain	2–1	Ajaccio	Saint-Germain-en-Laye
	Dogliani 5' (pen.); Spiegler 57'	Report	Albaladéjo 44'	Stadium: Stade Georges Lefèvre; Attendance: 2,053; Referee: Stéphane Frère

10 February 1974 22	Paris Saint-Germain	4–3	Nevers	Saint-Germain-en-Laye
	Laposte 4'; Dogliani 37'; Spiegler 51', 73'	Report	Cañizares 67'; Marciniak 75', 77'	Stadium: Stade Georges Lefèvre; Attendance: 1,776; Referee: Alain Delmer

17 February 1974 23	Châteauroux	2–1	Paris Saint-Germain	Châteauroux
	Verrier 62'; Vacher 70'	Report	Dogliani 42'	Stadium: Stade Gaston Petit; Attendance: 2,870; Referee: Jean-Pierre Espugne-Darses

24 February 1974 24	Paris Saint-Germain	0–0	Mulhouse	Saint-Germain-en-Laye
		Report		Stadium: Stade Georges Lefèvre; Attendance: 1,743; Referee: Raymond Poncin

17 March 1974 25	Avignon	3–3	Paris Saint-Germain	Avignon
	Pellegrini 32', 86'; Bussi 85'	Report	Spiegler 12', 13', 18'	Stadium: Parc des Sports; Attendance: 1,400; Referee: Guy Mouchotte

24 March 1974 26	Paris Saint-Germain	3–1	Cannes	Saint-Germain-en-Laye
	Dogliani 65', 75', 83' (pen.)	Report	Ahache 66'	Stadium: Stade Georges Lefèvre; Attendance: 2,050; Referee: Stéphane Frère

6 April 1974 27	Gueugnon	0–1	Paris Saint-Germain	Gueugnon
		Report	André 77'	Stadium: Stade Jean Laville; Attendance: 2,227; Referee: Michel Vautrot

14 April 1974 28	Paris Saint-Germain	0–0	Sète	Paris
		Report		Stadium: Stade Jean-Bouin; Attendance: 1,645; Referee: Louis Dhumerelle

20 April 1974 29	Red Star	2–0	Paris Saint-Germain	Saint-Ouen-sur-Seine
	González 7'; Combin 10'	Report		Stadium: Stade Bauer; Attendance: 13,982; Referee: Stéphane Frère

25 April 1974 30	Paris Saint-Germain	3–1	Mantes	Paris
	Sanchez 55' (o.g.); Dogliani 63'; Spiegler 83'	Report	Dubus 30'	Stadium: Parc des Princes; Attendance: 2,006; Referee: Marc Buils

1 May 1974 19	Paris Saint-Germain	3–1	Toulon	Paris
	Deloffre 38'; M'Pelé 61', 87' (pen.)	Report	Bade 73' (o.g.)	Stadium: Parc des Princes; Attendance: 7,586; Referee: Eugène Deleplace

12 May 1974 32	Paris Saint-Germain	6–1	Arles	Saint-Germain-en-Laye
	Laposte 48'; Renaut 51'; M'Pelé 53'; Spiegler 75', 89'; Deloffre 80'	Report	Koum 24'	Stadium: Stade Georges Lefèvre; Attendance: 1,163; Referee: Jean-Pierre Peauger

15 May 1974 31	Vittel	0–2	Paris Saint-Germain	Vittel
		Report	André 75'; Dossevi 77'	Stadium: Stade Jean-Bouloumié; Attendance: 643; Referee: Georges Konrath

19 May 1974 33	Fontainebleau	2–4	Paris Saint-Germain	Fontainebleau
	Viala 18'; Rachic 21'	Report	Laposte 26'; Renaut 27'; M'Pelé 34'; Marella 75'	Stadium: Stade de la Faisanderie; Attendance: 2,073; Referee: Jean Bancourt

26 May 1974 34	Paris Saint-Germain	2–0	Béziers	Saint-Germain-en-Laye
	Spiegler 7'; Marella 53'	Report		Stadium: Stade Georges Lefèvre; Attendance: 1,889; Referee: Marcel Bacou

31 May 1974 Promotion play-offs	Valenciennes	2–1	Paris Saint-Germain	Valenciennes
	Jeskowiak 61'; Wilczek 75' (pen.)	Report	M'Pelé 22'	Stadium: Stade Nungesser; Attendance: 10,036; Referee: Robert Héliès

4 June 1974 Promotion play-offs	Paris Saint-Germain	4–2 (5–4 agg.)	Valenciennes	Paris
	M'Pelé 35'; Dogliani 54', 75'; Marella 61'	Report	Neubert 39'; Wilczek 48'	Stadium: Parc des Princes; Attendance: 19,511; Referee: Robert Wurtz

=== Coupe de France ===
==== Preliminary rounds ====
16 December 1973 Sixth round	Paris Saint-Germain	1–0	VS Chartres	Saint-Germain-en-Laye
	André 80'	Report		Stadium: Stade Georges Lefèvre; Attendance: 871; Referee: Jean Maillard

6 January 1974 Seventh round	Le Havre	2–6	Paris Saint-Germain	Le Havre
	Lhoste 34'; Anquetin 81'	Report	M'Pelé 12'; Deloffre 42'; Dumot 50'; Marella 67', 83', 85'	Stadium: Stade Jules Deschaseaux; Attendance: 4,267; Referee: Jean-Marie Meeus

==== Round of 64 ====
3 February 1974 Single leg	Paris Saint-Germain	1–0	Dunkerque	Amiens
	Dogliani 53' (pen.)	Report		Stadium: Stade Moulonguet; Attendance: 3,383; Referee: Mr. Gueskub

==== Round of 32 ====
2 March 1974 First leg	Nancy	1–2	Paris Saint-Germain	Tomblaine
	Curbelo 70'	Report	André 14'; M'Pelé 17'	Stadium: Stade Marcel Picot; Attendance: 6,628; Referee: Jean-Pierre Peauger

9 March 1974 Second leg	Paris Saint-Germain	2–2 (4–3 agg.)	Nancy	Paris
	André 14', 32'	Report	Castronovo 5'; Di Caro 29'	Stadium: Parc des Princes; Attendance: 17,725; Referee: Achille Verbecke

==== Round of 16 ====
30 March 1974 First leg	Metz	0–2	Paris Saint-Germain	Metz
		Report	M'Pelé 57', 72'	Stadium: Stade Saint-Symphorien; Attendance: 12,035; Referee: Robert Frauciel

3 April 1974 Second leg	Paris Saint-Germain	2–1 (4–1 agg.)	Metz	Paris
	M'Pelé 32'; Marella 50'	Report	Hausknecht 6'	Stadium: Parc des Princes; Attendance: 25,000; Referee: Gabriel Besory

==== Quarter-finals ====
4 May 1974 First leg	Paris Saint-Germain	0–5	Reims	Paris
		Report	Bianchi 3', 19', 82'; Krawczyk 20'; Richard 67'	Stadium: Parc des Princes; Attendance: 44,534; Referee: Michel Vautrot

8 May 1974 Second leg	Reims	2–2 (7–2 agg.)	Paris Saint-Germain	Reims
	Zywica 9'; Richard 23'	Report	M'Pelé 37' (pen.); André 55'	Stadium: Stade Auguste-Delaune; Attendance: 15,000; Referee: Robert Frauciel

== Statistics ==
=== Appearances and goals ===
24 players featured in at least one official match, and the club scored 93 goals in official competitions, including two own goals.

Rank	Player	Position	Appearances	Goals	Source
1	(France) Jean Deloffre	MF	44	4	
2	(France) Jean-Louis Leonetti	MF	44	0	
3	(France) Louis Cardiet	DF	41	1	
4	(France) Jacques Laposte	MF	38	5	
5	(France) Christian André	FW	36	13	
6	(France) Éric Renaut	DF	36	4	
7	(France) Jean-Pierre Dogliani	FW	35	17	
8	(France) Jacky Bade	DF	31	0	
9	(Republic of the Congo) François M'Pelé	FW	26	13	
10	(France) Camille Choquier	GK	25	0	
11	(France) Michel Marella	FW	23	7	
12	(Israel) Mordechai Spiegler	FW	21	10	
13	(France) Jean-Louis Brost	FW	21	6	
14	(France) Jacky Planchard	GK	20	0	
15	(France) Bernard Béréau	DF	19	0	
16	(Togo) Othniel Dossevi	FW	17	6	
17	(France) Bernard Dumot	MF	11	1	
18	(Brazil) Armando Monteiro	FW	9	4	
19	(France) Christian Quéré	DF	7	0	
20	(France) Michel Llodra	MF	3	0	
21	(France) Patrice Zbinden	DF	3	0	
22	(France) Pierre Bajoc	DF	2	0	
23	(France) Didier Ledunois	DF	2	0	
24	(France) Guy Nosibor	FW	2	0	
