= 2024–25 Coupe de France preliminary rounds, Grand Est =

The 2024–25 Coupe de France preliminary rounds, Grand Est was the qualifying competition to decide which teams from the leagues of the Grand Est region of France took part in the main competition from the seventh round.

A total of twenty teams qualified from the Grand Est preliminary rounds.

In the 2023–24 edition of the competition, US Thionville Lusitanos and Sarreguemines FC both progressed furthest, reaching the round of 64 stage. Thionville were defeated by Ligue 1 side Olympique de Marseille by a single goal, whilst Sarreguemines succumbed to Ligue 2 side FC Valenciennes in a two-goal defeat.

== Draws and Fixtures ==
On 18 July 2024, the league published the draw for the first round of the competition. The draw consisted of 360 ties featuring teams from district divisions and some from the third tier of the regional league. The draw also listed the 213 clubs still exempt at this stage, confirming that 933 from the region were taking part in the competition this season. The second round draw was published on 20 August 2024, and saw the remaining teams from the third tier of the regional league, and all but four teams from the second tier of the regional league, join the competition. The third round draw, which say the entry of all remaining teams from the regional league, the seven teams from Championnat National 3, and the qualifying team from Saint Pierre and Miquelon, was published on 3 September 2024.

The fourth round draw, which saw the five teams from Championnat National 2 enter the competition, was published in three parts (with reference to the three geographical sectors the league splits itself into) on 17 and 18 September 2024. The fifth round draw was published on 1 October 2024, and saw the single Championnat National team from the region enter the competition. The sixth round draw was published on 17 October 2024.

=== First round ===
These matches were played on 15, 16, 17, 18 and 21 August 2024.

First Round Results: Grand Est
Tie no	Home team (Tier)	Score	Away team (Tier)
1.	FC Haybes (10)	3–0 (Note: Tie won by means of forfeit.)	AS Monthermé-Thilay (11)
2.	FC Pouru Saint-Rémy (11)	2–5	AS Bourg-Rocroi (9)
3.	FC Puilly Entente des Pays d'Yvois (12)	0–6	Nord Ardennes (9)
4.	US Saint-Menges (10)	3–3 (4–5 p)	ES Auvillers/Signy-le-Petit (10)
5.	FC Sailly (11)	2–0	FC Rimogne (11)
6.	FC Allobais Doncherois (11)	1–0	US Fumay-Charnois (10)
7.	AS Mouzon (10)	1–9	US Bazeilles (8)
8.	QV Douzy (10)	0–1	FC Blagny-Carignan (8)
9.	JS Remilly Aillicourt (11)	3–1	US Revin (9)
10.	Joyeuse de Warcq (11)	1–5	US Les Ayvelles (8)
11.	AS Boulzicourt (10)	5–4	US La Francheville (11)
12.	ASR Raucourt (11)	4–3	ES Saulces-Monclin (10)
13.	Liart-Signy FC (9)	0–0 (6–5 p)	FC Porcien (9)
14.	SOS Buzancy (10)	2–0	AS Franco-Turque Charleville-Mézières (9)
15.	USC Lucquy (11)	1–0	Le Theux FC (9)
16.	US Flize (10)	1–1 (5–4 p)	USA Le Chesne (8)
17.	AS Lumes (11)	1–1 (5–6 p)	SC Vivarois (9)
18.	JS Vrignoise (11)	1–2	USC Nouvion-sur-Meuse (9)
19.	ES Croix du Sud (12)	1–4	SL Pontfaverger (10)
20.	Sacy FC (12)	3–0	AS Taissy (9)
21.	AS Mourmelon Livry Bouy (10)	2–3	FC Saint-Martin-sur-le-Pré/La Veuve/Recy (10)
22.	ES Witry-les-Reims (9)	9–2	FC Vallée de la Suippe (10)
23.	US Fismes Ardre et Vesle (9)	5–2	Argonne FC (10)
24.	ES Muizonnaise (11)	2–7	FC Caillot (9)
25.	SC Viennois (11)	1–5	US Oiry (9)
26.	FC Pays de France (11)	1–5	AS Saint-Brice-Courcelles (8)
27.	FC Prunay (11)	1–4	AS Gueux (9)
28.	SC Montmirail (10)	2–2 (3–1 p)	US Machault (11)
29.	Saint-Memmie FC (11)	0–18	FC Tinqueux Champagne (8)
30.	Entente Étoges-Vert (11)	0–3	US Avize-Grauves (8)
31.	ES Pleurs (11)	5–0	AS Luxémont-et-Villotte (12)
32.	Foyer de Soudron (11)	0–1	Entente Somsois Margerie Saint-Utin (9)
33.	AS Loisy-sur-Marne (10)	3–6	AS Sud Champagne et Der (10)
34.	FC Ferton (12)	3–3 (4–5 p)	US Couvrot (10)
35.	ES Gaye (12)	0–3	ASPTT Châlons (8)
36.	AS Heiltz-le-Maurupt (11)	0–6	AS Cheminon (11)
37.	FC Bignicourier (11)	1–4	ES Côteaux Sud (9)
38.	Compertrix FC (12)	4–3	USS Sermaize (10)
39.	AS Marolles (10)	0–1	US Esternay (10)
40.	AS Courtisols ESTAN (10)	0–2	FC Haute Borne (10)
41.	UCS Nogentaise (11)	2–7	FC Morgendois (9)
42.	AS Droupt-Saint-Basle (10)	3–0	ESC Melda (9)
43.	US Vendeuvre-Dienville (9)	3–3 (7–8 p)	Rosières Omnisports (8)
44.	Saint-André Football (11)	0–1	US Chaource (11)
45.	Torvilliers AC (9)	2–1	Amicale Saint-Germain (10)
46.	UFC Aube (9)	0–1	Foyer Barsequanais (8)
47.	FC Var-N (11)	6–2	AS Portugaise Nogent-sur-Seine (9)
48.	Étoile Chapelaine (10)	3–2	ES Municipaux Troyes (8)
49.	Comores Aube (11)	1–3	Étoile Lusigny (10)
50.	FC Bréviandes (10)	5–0	SC Savières (10)
51.	FC Trainel (9)	4–4 (5–4 p)	JS Vaudoise (9)
52.	AS Pont-Saint-Marie (10)	6–0	FC Nord Est Aubois (9)
53.	ASL Mediolanaise (11)	0–8	FC Bologne (9)
54.	AS Longeville-sur-la-Laines (10)	5–0	FC Dampierre (10)
55.	US Rouvres Auberive (10)	2–2 (4–3 p)	US Wassy Brousseval (11)
56.	US Bricon (10)	3–0	FCCS Bragard (10)
57.	Espérance Saint-Dizier (9)	10–1	FC Sud Champagne (9)
58.	AS Chamouilley Roches-sur-Marne (10)	3–0	ES des 3 Châteaux (10)
59.	SL Ornel (9)	3–3 (5–4 p)	AS Poissons-Noncourt (10)
60.	CS Doulaincourt-Saucourt (10)	6–2	US Bourbonnaise (10)
61.	US Fayl-Billot/Hortes (11)	3–6	Colombey FC (10)
62.	CA Rolampontais (10)	3–0	US Biesles (9)
63.	US Arc-en-Barrois (11)	0–4	FC Prez Bourmont (8)
64.	Les Jeunes Saulxurois (11)	2–6	FC Villiers-en-Lieu (10)
65.	SR Neuilly-l'Évêque (9)	4–1	US Voillecomte (10)
66.	FC Varennes 55 (11)	0–3	SC Commercy (10)
67.	FC Dugny (9)	1–0	ES Lérouvillois Cheminote (10)
68.	FC Fains-Véel (10)	5–1	Association Saint-Laurent-Mangiennes (9)
69.	SC Les Islettes (10)	1–4	ASC Charny-sur-Meuse (9)
70.	Gars de l'Ornois Gondrecourt-Le-Château (11)	2–11	FC Saint-Mihiel (9)
71.	AS Dieue-Sommedieue (9)	0–3	US Thierville (9)
72.	FC Belleray (10)	2–3	ASC Montiers-sur-Saulx (10)
73.	ES Tilly Ambly Villers Bouquemont (9)	1–5	RC Saulx et Barrois (10)
74.	FC Demange (11)	1–8	AS Tréveray (9)
75.	AS Baudonvilliers (11)	1–3 (Note: Tie reversed from original draw.)	FC Pagny-sur-Meuse (10)
76.	ES Maizey-Lacroix (10)	3–2	AS Val d'Ornain (10)
77.	FC Revigny (9)	2–3	Lorraine Vaucouleurs (9)
78.	US Lamarche (11)	1–0	FC Darney Val de Saône (10)
79.	Dogneville FC (11)	0–4	AS Gironcourt (10)
80.	FC Martigny-les-Bains (11)	3–0	CD Saint-Laurent Épinal (12)
81.	AS Nomexy-Vincey-Moriville (9)	13–1	RF Bulgnéville (10)
82.	AS La Chapelle-aux-Bois (11)	2–2 (2–4 p)	CS Charmes (9)
83.	AS Essegney-Langley (12)	0–17	ASL Coussey-Greux (10)
84.	EFC Épinal (12)	1–2	AS Girancourt-Dommartin-Chaumousey (8)
85.	FC Amerey Xertigny (9)	9–1	FC Val d'Ajol (10)
86.	La Saint-Maurice Poussay (11)	2–2 (8–7 p)	US Mirecourt-Hymont (10)
87.	FC Thaon City (12)	1–3	AS Saint-Nabord (9)
88.	ASC Dompaire (10)	1–3	FC Hadol-Dounoux-Uriménil (9)
89.	RC Saulxures-lès-Bulgnéville (12)	0–3	AS Plombières (10)
90.	ES Haute Meurthe (10)	1–1 (3–0 p)	FC Remiremont Saint-Étienne (10)
91.	AS Cheniménil (11)	0–3	ASF Saulxures-sur-Moselotte-Thiéfosse (12)
92.	RC Corcieux (11)	3–0	US Senones (11)
93.	SM Bruyères (10)	2–0	SM Etival (10)
94.	AS Ramonchamp (10)	13–0	AS Vallée de la Moselle (11)
95.	FC Des Ballons (9)	1–5	FC Sainte-Marguerite (9)
96.	ES Michelloise (11)	2–2 (4–2 p)	SR Pouxeux Jarménil (11)
97.	AS Aydoilles (11)	0–6	AS Gérardmer (8)
98.	FC Granges-sur-Vologne (10)	4–1	Entente Bru-Jeanménil SBH (10)
99.	US Arches-Archettes-Raon (10)	0–6	FC Haute Moselotte (9)
100.	Saulcy FC (10)	4–0	FC Saint-Amé Julienrupt (10)
101.	FC Dommartin-lès-Remiremont (9)	4–0	FC Le Tholy (10)
102.	SM Taintrux (10)	3–3 (8–7 p)	AS Vagney (9)
103.	ES Gorcy Cosnes (11)	0–10	CS Godbrange (9)
104.	RC Crusnes Audun (10)	3–0	AS Mars-la-Tour (11)
105.	CS Bassin Ornais (9)	2–1	JS Thil (9)
106.	FC Mexy (11)	4–4 (5–4 p)	AJSE Montauville (9)
107.	Olympic Saint Charles Haucourt (10)	1–3	ES Longuyon (8)
108.	FC Loisy (11)	4–2	US Avrilloise (12)
109.	US Lexy (10)	4–1	FC Pont-à-Mousson (10)
110.	ES Cons-Ugny Val de Chiers (9)	3–2	CSP Réhon (9)
111.	GS Thiaucourt (10)	0–2	USB Longwy (9)
112.	US Conflans Doncourt (9)	1–5	AS Mercy-le-Bas (10)
113.	MJC Pichon (9)	4–3	FC Nurhak (10)
114.	FC Atton (11)	0–3	AJS René II (10)
115.	Maxéville FC (10)	2–5	FC Dieulouard Marbache Belleville (8)
116.	AS Grand Couronné (11)	0–3	FC Écrouves (9)
117.	ES Custines-Malleloy (9)	2–2 (5–4 p)	AS Haut-du-Lièvre Nancy (9)
118.	Entente Sud 54 (11)	0–7	Toul JCA (9)
119.	USC Foug (11)	1–3	FC Toul (9)
120.	AS Belleau (12)	1–7	GSA Tomblaine (9)
121.	AS Colombey (10)	2–0	AS Dommartin-lès-Toul (10)
122.	AS Velaine-en-Haye (10)	7–0	FR Faulx (11)
123.	AS Chavigny (10)	6–0	FC Lucey-Boucq-Trondes (12)
124.	AF Laxou Sapinière (9)	1–4	Omnisports Frouard Pompey (9)
125.	ES Bayon-Roville (11)	0–2	FC Dombasle-sur-Meurthe (8)
126.	FR Thiaville (11)	3–2	AS Blâmont (9)
127.	FC Houdemont (9)	0–0 (6–7 p)	Stade Flévillois (9)
128.	FC Pont-Saint-Vincent (11)	0–5	SC Baccarat (9)
129.	GAS Croismare (12)	0–6	FC Seichamps (9)
130.	AS Art-sur-Meuthe Bosserville Lenoncourt (11)	9–0	AS Varangéville Saint-Nicolas (10)
131.	Amicale de Chanteheux (11)	1–2	US Rosières-aux-Salines (9)
132.	AF Einville (12)	0–8	AS Rehainviller Hérimenil (11)
133.	SC Chaligny (12)	1–7	AS Laneuveville Marainviller (9)
134.	GS Vézelise (10)	2–1	ASC Saulxures-lès-Nancy (10)
135.	Football Lunéville Turc (10)	0–3	AC Blainville-Damelevières (8)
136.	ES Badonviller-Celles (11)	1–1 (4–2 p)	AS Sommerviller-Vermois (10)
137.	FC Novéant (9)	5–2	EF Delme-Solgne (9)
138.	AS Metz Grange-aux-Bois (10)	5–4	Ars-sur-Moselle FC (10)
139.	AS Ay-sur-Moselle (11)	0–3	SC Marly (9)
140.	JA Rémilly (11)	3–0	AS Hauconcourt (10)
141.	FC Verny-Louvigny-Cuvry (8)	0–0 (4–2 p)	ES Metz (9)
142.	US Ancy-Corny-Jouy (10)	3–1	La Lyre Sportive Vantoux (11)
143.	ES Courcelles-sur-Nied (10)	3–3 (7–8 p)	AS Saint-Julien-lès-Metz (9)
144.	Cuvry FC (11)	2–5	SC Moulins-lès-Metz (10)
145.	FC Montois (11)	3–3 (1–3 p)	AS Metz Porto (12)
146.	Académie Jules Bocandé (10)	0–1	ESAP Metz (8)
147.	Entente Gravelotte-Verneville (10)	5–1	US Ban-Saint-Martin (11)
148.	AS Magny (11)	0–3	Fleury FC (9)
149.	JS Metz Scy-Chazelles (10)	0–0 (3–0 p)	CO Metz Bellecroix (10)
150.	AF Metz Arsenal (12)	1–3	JS Renaissance Saint-Christophe Metz (12)
151.	US Guentrange (10)	2–4	FC Woippy (9)
152.	AS Entrange (11)	5–3	US Florange-Ebange (10)
153.	RS Ottange-Nondkeil (11)	0–1	UL Rombas (9)
154.	FC Pierrevillers (11)	3–3 (3–4 p)	Entente Bure-Boulange (10)
155.	US Fontoy (9)	1–1 (3–5 p)	US Volkrange (10)
156.	FC Angevillers (11)	0–5	US Marspich (10)
157.	FC Guénange (12)	4–0	AS Plateau Sainte-Marie-aux-Chênes (11)
158.	JL Knutange (11)	1–2	AS Les Côteaux (8)
159.	AS Konacker (11)	0–10	SC Terville (9)
160.	US Aumetz (11)	1–5	ES Garche (10)
161.	FC Hayange (9)	2–0	CS Volmerange-les-Mines (10)
162.	AS Sœtrich (10)	2–2 (1–4 p)	RS Serémange-Erzange (10)
163.	AG Metzervisse (8)	8–0	RS Kœnigsmacker (12)
164.	FC Mondelange (11)	4–1	JS Rettel Hunting Contz (11)
165.	FC Éblange (11)	2–0	US Hestroff (12)
166.	AS Anzeling Edling (11)	3–4	US Vigy (11)
167.	US Waldweistroff (11)	4–2	JS Bousse (11)
168.	US Bambiderstroff (11)	1–1 (3–4 p)	JS Distroff (11)
169.	FC Vœlfling (11)	3–1	JSO Ennery (10)
170.	RS La Maxe (10)	0–0 (3–0 p)	CO Bouzonville (9)
171.	US Oudrenne (10)	4–1	AS Sainte-Barbe Sanry Méchy (10)
172.	US Argancy (11)	3–0	ES Richemont (10)
173.	TS Bertrange (9)	2–3	US Trois Frontières (10)
174.	ES Kœnigsmacker-Kédange (9)	1–2	ASC Basse-Ham (10)
175.	AS Guerting (10)	2–2 (3–4 p)	CS Stiring-Wendel (9)
176.	FC Carling (11)	0–3	FC Bruch (10)
177.	US Holving (10)	1–1 (2–4 p)	Flétrange SA (10)
178.	FC Altrippe (12)	0–3	US Hundling (10)
179.	JS Wenheck (9)	2–1	ASJA Saint-Avold (10)
180.	AS Kerbach (11)	0–5	US Behren-lès-Forbach (8)
181.	ES Lixing Vahl Laning (10)	2–1	FC Hochwald (9)
182.	FC Farschviller (10)	3–0	CS Diebling (11)
183.	SC L'Hôpital (11)	2–2 (3–4 p)	US Rémering Villing (10)
184.	AS Teting-Pontpierre (11)	0–3	ES Petite-Rosselle (10)
185.	FC Coume (9)	0–3	ES Macheren Petit-Ebersviller (8)
186.	AS Falck (12)	0–9	SO Ippling (10)
187.	Huchet AC Saint-Avold (11)	0–4	FC Folschviller (8)
188.	AS Neunkirch (9)	5–0	FC Rahling (10)
189.	FC Rohrbach Bining (10)	1–4	ES Rimling-Erching-Obergailbach (9)
190.	ES Wies-Woelf 93 (10)	6–0	AS Rech (11)
191.	Entente Neufgrange-Siltzheim (12)	3–4	AS Montbronn (8)
192.	AS Le Val-de-Guéblange (9)	3–0	FC Waldhouse-Walschbronn (10)
193.	US Roth (11)	2–5	Entente Schorbach Hottviller Volmunster 13 (11)
194.	FC Bitche (10)	2–0	FC Sarralbe (9)
195.	ES Ormersviller-Epping (11)	3–2	US Rouhling (10)
196.	US Hilsprich (11)	1–1 (2–4 p)	FC Metzing (8)
197.	US Woustviller (11)	0–0 (3–4 p)	FC Hambach (9)
198.	FC Lemberg (10)	4–1	AS Lixing-lès-Rouhling (11)
199.	Entente Petit-Réderching Siersthal (11)	3–0	Saint-Louis 2017 (11)
200.	AS Welferding (11)	4–1	ES Gros Réderching-Bettviller (9)
201.	CS Wittring (10)	0–0 (0–3 p)	SF Enchenberg (10)
202.	AS Mouterhouse (11)	0–8	Union Soucht Goetzenbruck Meisenthal 2022 (9)
203.	AS Réchicourt-le-Château (11)	0–4	AS Bliesbruck (9)
204.	USF Brouderdorff (10)	0–1	EFT Sarrebourg (9)
205.	SC Vic-sur-Seille (11)	1–1 (1–3 p)	US Saint-Louis Lutzelbourg (10)
206.	AS Bettborn Hellering (9)	2–1 (Note: AS Bettborn Hellering penalised, AS Freybouse-Frémestroff qualify.)	AS Freybouse-Frémestroff (10)
207.	JF Vergaville (12)	3–4	FC Abreschviller (9)
208.	FC Francaltroff (11)	0–2	SR Gosselming (10)
209.	FC Troisfontaines (11)	2–7	SS Hilbesheim (9)
210.	AS Schaeferhof Dabo (11)	0–0 (3–4 p)	AS Kalhausen (9)
211.	FC Château-Salins (9)	2–3	FC Dieuze (10)
212.	AS Brouviller (10)	4–0	SR Sarraltroff (11)
213.	US Schneckenbusch (12)	3–6	AS Hellimer (10)
214.	SR Langatte (11)	2–4	Montagnarde Walscheid (8)
215.	Sportive Lorquinoise (9)	2–0 (Note: Sportive Lorquinoise penalised due to fielding an ineligible player, ES Avricourt Moussey qualify.)	ES Avricourt Moussey (10)
216.	Entente de la Mossig Wasselonne/Romanswiller (11)	5–1	FC Monswiller (12)
217.	US Schwenheim-Waldolwisheim (13)	0–8	SC Dettwiller (11)
218.	AS Offwiller (13)	2–3	Entente Trois Maisons-Phalsbourg (9)
219.	Entente Mackwiller-Waldhambach (12)	1–2	AS Lupstein (10)
220.	FC Mulhausen (13)	1–5	AS Weinbourg (11)
221.	ES Wimmenau/Wingen-sur-Moder (12)	2–1	AS Rehthal (10)
222.	AS Uhrwiller (9)	3–0	FC Kindwiller (10)
223.	FC Steinbourg (13)	2–3	CSIE Harskirchen (10)
224.	FC Keskastel (11)	0–6	FC Dossenheim-sur-Zinsel (9)
225.	US Imbsheim (11)	1–1 (4–5 p)	FC Ernolsheim-lès-Saverne (12)
226.	ASC Brotsch (12)	1–5	FA Val de Moder (9)
227.	AS Weyer (11)	0–7 (Note: FC Saverne penalised, AS Weyer qualify.)	FC Saverne (9)
228.	FC Alteckendorf (13)	2–2 (3–4 p)	FC Dauendorf (12)
229.	FC Dambach/Neunhoffen (13)	2–1	AS Wœrth (12)
230.	FC Niedermodern (11)	1–5	US Ettendorf (9)
231.	AS Wahlenheim-Bernolsheim (13)	2–6	FC Durrenbach (9)
232.	FC Eschbach (11)	4–1	FC Batzendorf (12)
233.	FC Schwindratzheim (11)	3–3 (3–4 p)	AS Mertzwiller (10)
234.	US Mommenheim (13)	0–5	Fatih-Sport Haguenau (11)
235.	FC Niederrœdern/Olympique Schaffhouse (12)	2–1	FC Lixhausen (13)
236.	ASL Duntzenheim (12)	4–1	US Gumbrechtshoffen (11)
237.	FCE Reichshoffen (13)	0–3	FC Niederschaeffolsheim (10)
238.	Réal Schloessel Haguenau (13)	2–2 (2–4 p)	FC Schaffhouse-sur-Zorn (10)
239.	AC Hinterfeld (11)	0–5	AS Platania Gundershoffen (10)
240.	FC Lampertsloch-Merkwiller (12)	0–7	AS Betschdorf (9)
241.	US Dalhunden (13)	4–4 (3–1 p)	AS Hatten (11)
242.	FC Herrlisheim (9)	0–2	SC Rœschwoog (10)
243.	SC Rittershoffen (13)	1–6	SS Beinheim (10)
244.	FC Rohrwiller (12)	0–2	FR Sessenheim-Stattmatten (9)
245.	FC Niederlauterbach (10)	1–0	FC Mothern (9)
246.	FC Hoffen (15)	0–6	FR Schœnenbourg-Memmelshoffen (13)
247.	FC Oberroedern/Aschbach (10)	0–4	US Preuschdorf-Langensoultzbach (8)
248.	FC Riedseltz (10)	3–1	AS Seebach (10)
249.	SR Rountzenheim-Auenheim (11)	0–3	US Surbourg (11)
250.	Entente Wissembourg/Altenstadt (13)	0–4	FC Soufflenheim (10)
251.	SC Roppenheim (13)	1–1 (4–1 p)	FC Soultz-sous-Forêts/Kutzenhausen (10)
252.	ASLC Berstett (12)	0–4	AS Mundolsheim (9)
253.	ES Pfettisheim (11)	0–4	AS Gambsheim (9)
254.	La Wantzenau FC (10)	2–1	FC Geudertheim (11)
255.	AS Kurtzenhouse (11)	2–6	SS Brumath (10)
256.	FC Oberhoffen (11)	0–4	FC Eckbolsheim (9)
257.	FC Niederhausbergen (13)	2–4	AS Reichstett (11)
258.	AS Dingsheim-Griesheim (11)	3–2	AS Pfulgriesheim (9)
259.	FC Oberhausbergen (10)	4–0	AS Kilstett (11)
260.	US Eckwersheim (10)	0–4	US Oberschaeffolsheim (8)
261.	FC Gries (12)	2–3	FC Weitbruch (9)
262.	ES Offendorf (13)	0–3	FC Lampertheim (9)
263.	FC Bischwiller (12)	1–8	US Turcs Bischwiller (9)
264.	FC Ecrivains-Schiltigheim-Bischheim (10)	4–3	US Hangenbieten (11)
265.	US Égalitaire Strasbourg Neudorf (13)	1–4	AS Musau Strasbourg (10)
266.	AS Espagnols Schiltigheim (13)	0–3	CS Neuhof Strasbourg (9)
267.	AS 2000 Strasbourg (13)	0–4	FC Eschau (8)
268.	ES Wolfisheim (13)	0–2	AS Holtzheim (9)
269.	SOAS Robertsau Strasbourg (12)	1–7	EB Achenheim (9)
270.	FC Lingolsheim (11)	3–2	AP Joie et Santé Strasbourg (9)
271.	ASE Cité de l'Ill Strasbourg (9)	3–0	ASPV Strasbourg (9)
272.	FC Egalité Strasbourg (13)	3–4	Entente Internationale Meinau Académie / SC Red Star Strasbourg (10)
273.	FC Entzheim (10)	2–2 (4–5 p) (Note: FC Ostwald penalised, FC Entzheim qualify.)	FC Ostwald (10)
274.	AS Strasbourg (9)	3–0 (Note: SC Red Star Strasbourg merged with Internationale Meinau Académie after the draw was made, and forfeited the tie.)	SC Red Star Strasbourg (10)
275.	FC Stockfeld Colombes (12)	0–1	Strasbourg Université Club (10)
276.	AS Haute Bruche (10)	1–1 (4–2 p)	FC Dangolsheim (11)
277.	AS Willgottheim (11)	3–4	AS Hohengœft (10)
278.	SR Dorlisheim (13)	1–5	AS Natzwiller (11)
279.	Erno FC (11)	1–0	AS Bischoffsheim (9)
280.	AS Bergbieten (11)	4–3	US Dachstein (10)
281.	FC Avolsheim (13)	1–7	USL Duppigheim (9)
282.	FC Breuschwickersheim (10)	2–0	CS Wolxheim (12)
283.	Entente Balbronn Westhoffen (12)	0–2	FC Rosheim (11)
284.	Entente Quatzenheim-Furdenheim (13)	0–2	AS Wisches-Russ-Lutzelhouse (11)
285.	Entente Sportive Haslach-Urmatt-Grendelbruch (13)	2–1	FC Marlenheim-Kirchheim (10)
286.	US Innenheim (13)	3–0	FC Schnersheim (13)
287.	ASC Blaesheim (12)	0–1	SC Dinsheim (12)
288.	FC Boersch (12)	1–4	AS Niedernai (11)
289.	FC Boofzheim (13)	3–1	FC Hipsheim (11)
290.	ASC Saint-Pierre-Bois/Triembach-au-Val (10)	10–0	OC Lipsheim (11)
291.	US Hindisheim (10)	4–5	FC Rhinau (8)
292.	AS Heiligenstein (11)	5–1	US Meistratzheim (11)
293.	SC Maisonsgoutte (13)	3–8	FC Rossfeld (8)
294.	ES Stotzheim (10)	2–1	CS Bernardsweller (11)
295.	FC Ebermunster (12)	0–6	CS Fegersheim (9)
296.	US Goxwiller (13)	0–3	AS Sermersheim (9)
297.	SR Zellwiller (11)	3–3 (5–4 p)	CA Plobsheim (12)
298.	US Nordhouse (13)	3–1	AS Obenheim (13)
299.	FC Kertzfeld (12)	0–5	FC Matzenheim (11)
300.	AS Marckolsheim (9)	3–2	US Baldenheim (9)
301.	US Artzenheim (13)	2–11	AS Portugais Sélestat (10)
302.	FC Binderheim (9)	1–1 (1–4 p)	AS Mussig (10)
303.	AS Muttersholtz (13)	0–6	AS Guémar (8)
304.	US Sundhouse (13)	2–2 (5–6 p)	AS Elsenheim (11)
305.	AS Châtenois (11)	2–4	US Huttenheim (11)
306.	FC Breitenbach (16)	1–3	FC Grussenheim (10)
307.	CS Sainte-Croix-aux-Mines (12)	5–0	FC Artolsheim (11)
308.	FC Hilsenheim (12)	3–1	RC Kintzheim (9)
309.	AS Saint-Hippolyte (13)	0–4	FC Wittisheim(12)
310.	SC Sélestat (9)	2–2 (2–4 p)	FR Jebsheim-Muntzenheim (10)
311.	SR Bergheim (11)	2–2 (4–3 p)	AS Schœnau (11)
312.	FC Vogelgrun Obersaasheim (12)	2–4	FC Heiteren (9)
313.	AS Canton Vert (10)	0–0 (4–3 p)	FC Niederhergheim (8)
314.	FC Wettolsheim (11)	1–1 (2–4 p)	AS Turckheim (10)
315.	FC Bennwihr (9)	1–0	AS Andolsheim (10)
316.	AS Sigolsheim (12)	1–5	FC Herrlisheim (9)
317.	AS Munster (9)	5–0	FC Oberhergheim (13)
318.	SR Widensolen (11)	3–2	FC Sainte-Croix-en-Plaine (9)
319.	US Gunsbach-Zimmerbach (12)	0–4	AS Pfaffenheim (9)
320.	FC Horbourg-Wihr (10)	3–1	AS Raedersheim (8)
321.	FCI Riquewihr (13)	0–1	AS Wintzenheim (10)
322.	FC Ingersheim (9)	3–0	SR Kaysersberg (10)
323.	AS Vallée Noble (12)	3–0	Colmar Unifié FC (13)
324.	FC Gundolsheim (11)	0–7	Stade Burnhauptois (8)
325.	AS Rixheim (11)	4–1	CS Mulhouse Bourtzwiller (9)
326.	FC Battenheim (13)	5–2	ÉS Wihr-au-Val (13)
327.	FC Merxheim (10)	0–0 (3–2 p)	FC Meyenheim (9)
328.	FC Buhl (9)	0–1	FC Baldersheim (9)
329.	FC Ensisheim (10)	1–1 (5–4 p)	FC Feldkirch (11)
330.	Bergholtz FC (12)	2–6	FC Ungersheim (10)
331.	FC Soultz 1919 (12)	8–0	AS Blodelsheim (13)
332.	Étoile Mulhouse (11)	3–3 (3–4 p)	FC Pfastatt 1926 (8)
333.	FC Habsheim (9)	1–1 (3–2 p)	FC Réguisheim (10)
334.	US Pulversheim FC (9)	1–0	FC Munchhouse (9)
335.	AS Rumersheim-le-Haut (12)	1–6	FC Sausheim (9)
336.	US Vallée de la Thur (9)	4–0	RC Mulhouse (10)
337.	FC Anatolie Mulhouse (10)	4–0	US Oberbruck Dolleren (10)
338.	FC Masevaux (10)	0–3	AS Aspach-le-Haut (10)
339.	SR Saint-Amarin (10)	0–7	FCRS Richwiller (8)
340.	Cernay FC (10)	0–3	FC Pays Rhénan (8)
341.	Thann FC 2017 (12)	4–13	AS Coteaux Mulhouse (9)
342.	AS Blanc Vieux-Thann (12)	1–4	FC Brunstatt (10)
343.	US Zimmersheim-Eschentzwiller (11)	0–1	FC Riedisheim (9)
344.	OS Mulhouse (13)	1–5	AS Lutterbach (9)
345.	FC Roderen (11)	3–2	US Doller (10)
346.	ASJ Oderen (13)	0–3	AS Heimsbrunn (10)
347.	FC Blue Star Reiningue (11)	1–3	AS Guewenheim (11)
348.	AS Ueberstrass Largitzen (13)	0–3	RC Dannemarie (8)
349.	RC Landser (12)	3–1	FC Illfurth (10)
350.	AS Wittersdorf (13)	2–2 (4–5 p)	FC Traubach (10)
351.	FC Seppois-Bisel (10)	0–3	FC Kappelen (8)
352.	FC Uffheim (9)	1–0	ASCCO Helfrantzkirch (11)
353.	AS Durlinsdorf (11)	5–0	US Azzurri Mulhouse (9)
354.	FC Village Neuf (10)	4–1	Montreux Sports (9)
355.	Union Carspach-Hirtzbach (10)	2–1 (Note: Match abandoned after 74 minutes due to serious injury. Result stood.)	AS Riespach (11)
356.	AS Hochstatt (11)	3–0	FC Sierentz (10)
357.	FC Steinbrunn-le-Bas (10)	0–3	Entente Oltingue Raedersdorf (10)
358.	Entente Grentzingen-Bettendorf (10)	1–4	US Hésingue (8)
359.	AS Schlierbach (12)	1–3	Entente Hagenbach-Balschwiller (10)
360.	AS Mertzen (12)	2–2 (4–5 p)	Alliance Folgensbourg Muespach (10)

=== Second round ===
These matches were played on 31 August 2024, and 1 and 3 September 2024.

Second Round Results: Grand Est
Tie no	Home team (Tier)	Score	Away team (Tier)
1.	FC Sailly (11)	0–10	FC Haybes (10)
2.	SC Vivarois (9)	3–1	ES Charleville-Mézières (8)
3.	Nord Ardennes (9)	4–0	AS Bourg-Rocroi (9)
4.	USC Lucquy (11)	5–0	US Flize (10)
5.	ASR Raucourt (11)	1–10	FC Blagny-Carignan (8)
6.	Olympique Torcy-Sedan (8)	0–6	AS Val de l'Aisne (8)
7.	JS Remilly Aillicourt (11)	2–3	AS Tournes/Renwez/Les Mazures/Arreux/Montcornet (8)
8.	US Les Ayvelles (8)	0–10	Rethel SF (7)
9.	US Bazeilles (8)	1–1 (7–6 p)	Liart-Signy FC (9)
10.	FC Allobais Doncherois (11)	0–1	AS Asfeld (7)
11.	SOS Buzancy (10)	0–9	CS Sedan Ardennes (7)
12.	AS Boulzicourt (10)	0–1	Cheveuges-Saint-Aignan CO (8)
13.	ES Auvillers/Signy-le-Petit (10)	1–3	USC Nouvion-sur-Meuse (9)
14.	US Oiry (9)	8–0	US Couvrot (10)
15.	ES Côteaux Sud (9)	7–0	SC Montmirail (10)
16.	US Avize-Grauves (8)	1–3 (Note: Tie reversed from original draw.)	ES Pleurs (11)
17.	AS Sud Champagne et Der (10)	2–1	CS Agéen (8)
18.	FC Côte des Blancs (7)	2–2 (4–3 p)	FCF La Neuvillette-Jamin (7)
19.	Espérance Rémoise (8)	6–4	FC Caillot (9)
20.	FC Saint-Martin-sur-le-Pré/La Veuve/Recy (10)	4–1	Sacy FC (12)
21.	Compertrix FC (12)	0–9	Vitry FC (7)
22.	AS Cheminon (11)	0–3	Châlons FCO (7)
23.	ASPTT Châlons (8)	1–2	Reims Murigny Franco Portugais (8)
24.	FC Tinqueux Champagne (8)	8–1	Nord Champagne FC (8)
25.	SL Pontfaverger (10)	0–6	AS Cernay-Berru-Lavannes (7)
26.	Entente Somsois Margerie Saint-Utin (9)	2–7	ES Witry-les-Reims (9)
27.	FC Haute Borne (10)	0–5	AS Saint-Brice-Courcelles (8)
28.	US Esternay (10)	3–4	Bétheny FC (8)
29.	AS Gueux (9)	2–4	SC Sézannais (8)
30.	US Fismes Ardre et Vesle (9)	0–2	FC Christo (7)
31.	Romilly Champagne FC (8)	3–1	FC Vallant/Les Grès (8)
32.	FC Trainel (9)	3–2	Étoile Lusigny (10)
33.	AS Droupt-Saint-Basle (10)	2–1	JS Saint-Julien FC (7)
34.	FC Morgendois (9)	2–2 (4–5 p)	Étoile Chapelaine (10)
35.	ES Nord Aubois (8)	1–0	Alliance Sud-Ouest Football Aubois (8)
36.	AS Pont-Saint-Marie (10)	2–2 (4–3 p)	Rosières Omnisports (8)
37.	US Chaource (11)	1–2	FC Nogentais (7)
38.	Torvilliers AC (9)	2–3	RCS La Chapelle (7)
39.	FC Bréviandes (10)	5–3	FC Var-N (11)
40.	Foyer Barsequanais (8)	4–1	AS Chartreux (8)
41.	AS Longeville-sur-la-Laines (10)	2–5	DS Eurville-Bienville (8)
42.	US Bricon (10)	0–6	AS Sarrey-Montigny (7)
43.	CA Rolampontais (10)	0–1	US Rouvres Auberive (10)
44.	FC Prez Bourmont (8)	3–2	USI Blaise (8)
45.	CS Doulaincourt-Saucourt (10)	1–4	ES Andelot-Rimaucourt-Bourdons (9)
46.	Espérance Saint-Dizier (9)	4–0	US Montier-en-Der (8)
47.	FC Villiers-en-Lieu (10)	2–3	CO Langres (10)
48.	Bar-sur-Aube FC (8)	4–0	FC Joinville-Vecqueville (9)
49.	Colombey FC (10)	1–11	Stade Chevillonnais (8)
50.	ASPTT Chaumont (8)	2–0	SR Neuilly-l'Évêque (9)
51.	FC Bologne (9)	1–0	FC Saints-Geosmois (7)
52.	SL Ornel (9)	1–2	AS Chamouilley Roches-sur-Marne (10)
53.	CS Chalindrey (8)	0–3	CS Maranville-Rennepont (9)
54.	ASF Saulxures-sur-Moselotte-Thiéfosse (12)	0–4	AS Ramonchamp (10)
55.	ES Haute Meurthe (10)	1–11	COS Villers (7)
56.	FC Hadol-Dounoux-Uriménil (9)	1–2	ES Avière Darnieulles (8)
57.	FC Granges-sur-Vologne (10)	0–5	ES Laneuveville (7)
58.	AS Gironcourt (10)	2–6	AS Saint-Nabord (9)
59.	AS Plombières (10)	1–1 (2–4 p)	Bulgnéville Contrex Vittel FC (8)
60.	FC Martigny-les-Bains (11)	2–5	ES Michelloise (11)
61.	AS Nomexy-Vincey-Moriville (9)	0–0 (3–5 p)	ES Golbey (7)
62.	FC Sainte-Marguerite (9)	3–1	FC Dommartin-lès-Remiremont (9)
63.	ASL Coussey-Greux (10)	1–5	GS Haroué-Benney (8)
64.	CS Charmes (9)	2–2 (1–4 p)	AS Girancourt-Dommartin-Chaumousey (8)
65.	La Saint-Maurice Poussay (11)	0–3	AS Gérardmer (8)
66.	FC Haute Moselotte (9)	1–1 (8–7 p)	SM Bruyères (10)
67.	RC Corcieux (11)	2–5	Saulcy FC (10)
68.	US Lamarche (11)	0–4	FC Amerey Xertigny (9)
69.	SM Taintrux (10)	1–4	FC Neufchâteau-Liffol (8)
70.	SC Commercy (10)	0–3	Lorraine Vaucouleurs (9)
71.	Omnisports Frouard Pompey (9)	5–2	AS Lay-Saint-Christophe/Bouxieres-aux-Dames (7)
72.	FC Écrouves (9)	0–7	Entente Sorcy Void-Vacon (7)
73.	ASC Montiers-sur-Saulx (10)	2–2 (4–5 p)	FC Loisy (11)
74.	AJS René II (10)	0–14	FC Dieulouard Marbache Belleville (8)
75.	FC Pagny-sur-Meuse (10)	0–3	Entente Centre Ornain (7)
76.	AS Colombey (10)	0–4	ENJ Val-de-Seille (8)
77.	ES Custines-Malleloy (9)	2–2 (4–2 p)	Bar-le-Duc FC (7)
78.	GSA Tomblaine (9)	5–0	Stade Flévillois (9)
79.	FC Toul (9)	2–5	AS Gondrevilley (8)
80.	FC Saint-Mihiel (9)	0–9	CS Blénod (8)
81.	ES Maizey-Lacroix (10)	0–3	AS Velaine-en-Haye (10)
82.	Toul JCA (9)	1–1 (5–3 p)	MJC Pichon (9)
83.	RC Saulx et Barrois (10)	2–4	US Behonne-Longeville-en-Barois (7)
84.	AS Tréveray (9)	0–0 (3–1 p)	FC Fains-Véel (10)
85.	US Saint-Louis Lutzelbourg (10)	0–3	FC Sarrebourg (7)
86.	FC Dombasle-sur-Meurthe (8)	2–1	SC Baccarat (9)
87.	AC Blainville-Damelevières (8)	2–1	FC Saint-Max-Essey (7)
88.	AS Laneuveville Marainviller (9)	0–2	FC Pulnoy (8)
89.	AS Chavigny (10)	1–5	AS Art-sur-Meuthe Bosserville Lenoncourt (11)
90.	US Rosières-aux-Salines (9)	2–1	ES Avricourt Moussey (10)
91.	Montagnarde Walscheid (8)	1–2	FC Abreschviller (9)
92.	FC Seichamps (9)	0–1	ES Heillecourt (7)
93.	FR Thiaville (11)	2–2 (3–4 p)	EFT Sarrebourg (9)
94.	SR Gosselming (10)	1–2	AS Réding (8)
95.	AS Rehainviller Hérimenil (11)	0–3	GS Vézelise (10)
96.	FC Dieuze (10)	6–0	ES Badonviller-Celles (11)
97.	SS Hilbesheim (9)	0–1	AS Ludres (8)
98.	AS Brouviller (10)	1–3	AS Freybouse-Frémestroff (10)
99.	FC Woippy (9)	2–0 (Note: FC Woippy penalised for fielding too many transferred players, JS Metz Scy-Chazelles qualify.)	JS Metz Scy-Chazelles (10)
100.	Fleury FC (9)	0–3	Athletic Cuvry Augny (8)
101.	SC Moulins-lès-Metz (10)	0–0 (5–3 p)	SC Marly (9)
102.	US Thierville (9)	1–4	ESAP Metz (8)
103.	JS Renaissance Saint-Christophe Metz (12)	0–1	FC Novéant (9)
104.	AS Metz Porto (12)	1–7	Entente Gravelotte-Verneville (10)
105.	FC Dugny (9)	1–5	US Etain-Buzy (8)
106.	US Argancy (11)	1–5	US Châtel Conquistadors (8)
107.	AS Metz Grange-aux-Bois (10)	2–2 (5–4 p)	Val de l'Orne FC (7)
108.	ASC Charny-sur-Meuse (9)	1–5	RS Magny (7)
109.	JA Rémilly (11)	2–3	Entente Vigneulles-Hannonville-Fresne (8)
110.	US Ancy-Corny-Jouy (10)	1–6	US Jarny (7)
111.	SF Verdun Belleville (8)	2–3	US Briey (8)
112.	RS Amanvillers (7)	3–0	FC Verny-Louvigny-Cuvry (8)
113.	USB Longwy (9)	5–0	US Volkrange (10)
114.	AS Entrange (11)	3–2	US Lexy (10)
115.	FC Yutz (7)	4–0	US Yutz (8)
116.	Entente Bure-Boulange (10)	2–0	AS Saulnes Longlaville (8)
117.	AS Mercy-le-Bas (10)	3–1	FC Mexy (11)
118.	US Illange (8)	3–1	FC Hayange (9)
119.	FC Hettange-Grande (7)	0–0 (4–2 p)	CS Veymerange (8)
120.	SC Terville (9)	1–2	ES Cons-Ugny Val de Chiers (9)
121.	FC Guénange (12)	0–0 (1–4 p)	AS Algrange (7)
122.	US Marspich (10)	2–6	ES Fameck (7)
123.	CS Bassin Ornais (9)	4–1	FC Bassin Piennois (8)
124.	RS Serémange-Erzange (10)	2–2 (6–5 p)	JS Audunoise (8)
125.	CS Godbrange (9)	8–1	ES Garche (10)
126.	RC Crusnes Audun (10)	4–2	ES Longuyon (8)
127.	UL Rombas (9)	0–2	AS Clouange (8)
128.	US Oudrenne (10)	8–1	US Vigy (11)
129.	RS La Maxe (10)	1–5	ES Marange-Silvange (8)
130.	FC Éblange (11)	0–1	FC Devant-les-Ponts Metz (8)
131.	UL Plantières Metz (7)	4–0	ES Woippy (8)
132.	ASC Basse-Ham (10)	1–4	FC Trémery (8)
133.	US Waldweistroff (11)	0–6	AS Les Côteaux (8)
134.	FC Vœlfling (11)	8–0	JS Distroff (11)
135.	FC Mondelange (11)	2–4	AS Saint-Julien-lès-Metz (9)
136.	AS Montigny-lès-Metz (7)	2–2 (5–6 p)	AG Metzervisse (8)
137.	US Trois Frontières (10)	1–6	ES Rosselange Vitry (7)
138.	AS Talange (8)	0–0 (3–4 p)	CA Boulay (7)
139.	Flétrange SA (10)	0–0 (4–5 p)	AS Le Val-de-Guéblange (9)
140.	US Valmont (8)	4–4 (1–3 p)	JS Wenheck (9)
141.	Entente Petit-Réderching Siersthal (11)	1–1 (2–4 p)	AS Kalhausen (9)
142.	ES Petite-Rosselle (10)	0–3	US Farébersviller 05 (8)
143.	US Hundling (10)	0–3	AS Neunkirch (9)
144.	FC Bruch (10)	1–1 (1–3 p)	FC Hambach (9)
145.	SF Enchenberg (10)	2–4	FC Farschviller (10)
146.	FC Metzing (8)	1–2	Union Soucht Goetzenbruck Meisenthal 2022 (9)
147.	SO Ippling (10)	3–1	ES Wies-Woelf 93 (10)
148.	FC Longeville-lès-Saint-Avold (8)	0–8	Achen-Etting-Schmittviller (7)
149.	US Behren-lès-Forbach (8)	4–2	US Alsting-Spicheren (8)
150.	CS Stiring-Wendel (9)	0–4	US Nousseviller (7)
151.	AS Welferding (11)	1–4	ES Macheren Petit-Ebersviller (8)
152.	ES Rimling-Erching-Obergailbach (9)	4–1	AS Hellimer (10)
153.	Entente Schorbach Hottviller Volmunster 13 (11)	2–1	ES Ormersviller-Epping (11)
154.	US Rémering Villing (10)	1–2	AS Bliesbruck (9)
155.	FC Bitche (10)	0–4	SO Merlebach (7)
156.	AS Montbronn (8)	2–5	SR Creutzwald 03 (8)
157.	FC Folschviller (8)	1–6	FC Freyming (8)
158.	Étoile Naborienne Saint-Avold (7)	3–2	AS Morhange (7)
159.	ES Lixing Vahl Laning (10)	2–2 (5–4 p)	FC Lemberg (10)
160.	FC Eschbach (11)	0–1	FC Durrenbach (9)
161.	Entente Trois Maisons-Phalsbourg (9)	2–4	US Wittersheim (8)
162.	Entente de la Mossig Wasselonne/Romanswiller (11)	1–7	AS Butten-Diemeringen (7)
163.	AS Uhrwiller (9)	3–0	AS Hochfelden (8)
164.	ASL Duntzenheim (12)	0–0 (0–3 p)	FC Schaffhouse-sur-Zorn (10)
165.	FA Val de Moder (9)	5–2	SC Drulingen (8)
166.	FC Ernolsheim-lès-Saverne (12)	0–0 (4–5 p)	AS Hohengœft (10)
167.	AS Weinbourg (11)	1–1 (6–5 p)	US Ettendorf (9)
168.	AS Weyer (11)	1–1 (5–6 p)	AS Ohlungen (7)
169.	FC Dossenheim-sur-Zinsel (9)	2–0	AS Lupstein (10)
170.	ES Wimmenau/Wingen-sur-Moder (12)	0–5	ASI Avenir (7)
171.	AS Mertzwiller (10)	1–2	AS Platania Gundershoffen (10)
172.	FC Dauendorf (12)	1–9	AS Ingwiller/Menchhoffen (8)
173.	SC Dettwiller (11)	1–1 (2–4 p)	FC Wingersheim (8)
174.	CSIE Harskirchen (10)	1–3	FC Schweighouse-sur-Moder (8)
175.	FC Weitbruch (9)	1–0	FC Niederlauterbach (10)
176.	FC Soufflenheim (10)	2–5	US Kaltenhouse-Marienthal (8)
177.	US Turcs Bischwiller (9)	1–1 (2–4 p)	FC Steinseltz (8)
178.	AS Gambsheim (9)	3–0	FR Sessenheim-Stattmatten (9)
179.	SS Beinheim (10)	3–3 (7–6 p)	FC Drusenheim (7)
180.	FC Riedseltz (10)	0–5	FC Saint-Etienne Seltz (8)
181.	FR Schœnenbourg-Memmelshoffen (13)	1–3	FC Dambach/Neunhoffen (13)
182.	US Dalhunden (13)	0–8	US Preuschdorf-Langensoultzbach (8)
183.	SC Rœschwoog (10)	7–0	AS Hunspach (8)
184.	US Schleithal (8)	0–1	FC Scheibenhard (7)
185.	FC Niederschaeffolsheim (10)	0–3	US Surbourg (11)
186.	SC Roppenheim (13)	0–8	FCE Schirrhein (7)
187.	FC Niederrœdern/Olympique Schaffhouse (12)	0–4	AS Betschdorf (9)
188.	Fatih-Sport Haguenau (11)	2–2 (4–5 p)	AS Hoerdt (7)
189.	EB Achenheim (9)	1–1 (2–3 p)	ASE Cité de l'Ill Strasbourg (9)
190.	AS Mundolsheim (9)	0–5	FC Dahlenheim (7)
191.	FC Entzheim (10)	2–5	FC Ecrivains-Schiltigheim-Bischheim (10)
192.	Strasbourg Université Club (10)	3–2	AS Elsau Portugais Strasbourg (8)
193.	SS Brumath (10)	1–1 (4–5 p)	FC Soleil Bischheim (7)
194.	AS Strasbourg (9)	2–2 (5–6 p)	La Wantzenau FC (10)
195.	FC Lampertheim (9)	0–1	FC Eschau (8)
196.	AS Dingsheim-Griesheim (11)	2–1	AS Reichstett (11)
197.	FC Oberhausbergen (10)	2–2 (5–4 p)	FC Truchtersheim (8)
198.	FC Lingolsheim (11)	1–3	AS Holtzheim (9)
199.	Entente Internationale Meinau Académie / SC Red Star Strasbourg (10)	2–2 (4–5 p)	CS Neuhof Strasbourg (9)
200.	FC Eckbolsheim (9)	2–3	SR Hoenheim (8)
201.	US Oberschaeffolsheim (8)	4–1	US Ittenheim (8)
202.	AS Musau Strasbourg (10)	0–3	AS Neudorf (7)
203.	FC Matzenheim (11)	3–5	CS Fegersheim (9)
204.	Entente Sportive Haslach-Urmatt-Grendelbruch (13)	0–6	US Scherwiller (7)
205.	FC Boofzheim (13)	1–6	FC Geispolsheim 01 (7)
206.	ES Stotzheim (10)	1–1 (5–4 p)	ALFC Duttlenheim (8)
207.	FC Breuschwickersheim (10)	3–2	AS Sermersheim (9)
208.	US Innenheim (13)	2–2 (3–4 p)	AS Natzwiller (11)
209.	AS Haute Bruche (10)	0–2	FC Rossfeld (8)
210.	AS Wisches-Russ-Lutzelhouse (11)	1–1 (5–3 p)	FC Rhinau (8)
211.	AS Niedernai (11)	0–1	ASL Robertsau (7)
212.	ASC Saint-Pierre-Bois/Triembach-au-Val (10)	0–7	ES Molsheim-Ernolsheim (7)
213.	Erno FC (11)	2–2 (1–3 p)	AJF Hautepierre (8)
214.	AS Heiligenstein (11)	3–3 (4–2 p)	AS Bergbieten (11)
215.	SC Dinsheim (12)	2–1	USL Duppigheim (9)
216.	FC Rosheim (11)	6–4	SR Zellwiller (11)
217.	US Nordhouse (13)	0–5	AS Menora Strasbourg (7)
218.	AS Wintzenheim (10)	1–4	FC Ingersheim (9)
219.	AS Portugais Sélestat (10)	1–0	AS Ribeauvillé (8)
220.	AS Elsenheim (11)	1–3	AS Pfaffenheim (9)
221.	AS Vallée Noble (12)	0–7	FC Rouffach (8)
222.	FC Wittisheim(12)	2–4	FC Bennwihr (9)
223.	AS Mussig (10)	0–1	FC Illhaeusern (7)
224.	FC Grussenheim (10)	2–10	Racing HW 96 (8)
225.	AS Munster (9)	1–6	AS Berrwiller-Hartsmannswiller (7)
226.	FC Hilsenheim (12)	1–2	AS Turckheim (10)
227.	FC Horbourg-Wihr (10)	– (Note: FC Horbourg-Wihr penalised, FC Ostheim-Housse qualify. Score unknown.)	FC Ostheim-Houssen (8)
228.	FC Heiteren (9)	2–1	AS Canton Vert (10)
229.	FR Jebsheim-Muntzenheim (10)	2–2 (2–4 p)	SR Bergheim (11)
230.	SR Widensolen (11)	1–3	AS Marckolsheim (9)
231.	US Huttenheim (11)	1–2	AS Guémar (8)
232.	CS Sainte-Croix-aux-Mines (12)	2–2 (1–3 p)	FC Herrlisheim (9)
233.	AGIIR Florival (8)	5–4	SC Ottmarsheim (8)
234.	FC Sausheim (9)	2–1	US Pulversheim FC (9)
235.	FC Ensisheim (10)	0–0 (4–2 p)	FC Bartenheim (7)
236.	Stade Burnhauptois (8)	3–3 (2–4 p)	FC Baldersheim (9)
237.	AS Rixheim (11)	0–4	AS Blotzheim (7)
238.	FC Soultz 1919 (12)	0–4	US Wittenheim (7)
239.	FC Battenheim (13)	3–4	FC Roderen (11)
240.	FC Merxheim (10)	3–3 (5–6 p)	Mouloudia Mulhouse (7)
241.	AS Aspach-le-Haut (10)	2–2 (5–4 p)	US Vallée de la Thur (9)
242.	AS Theodore Ruelisheim Wittenheim (8)	4–0	AS Heimsbrunn (10)
243.	FC Ungersheim (10)	1–1 (3–4 p)	FC Habsheim (9)
244.	FC Pfastatt 1926 (8)	1–4	FC Hirtzfelden (8)
245.	AS Guewenheim (11)	3–4	ASCA Wittelsheim (8)
246.	AS Coteaux Mulhouse (9)	5–0 (Note: AS Coteaux Mulhouse penalised, FC Fessenheim qualify.)	FC Fessenheim (8)
247.	FC Brunstatt (10)	1–4	FC Pays Rhénan (8)
248.	FC Village Neuf (10)	0–3	FC Saint-Louis Neuweg (7)
249.	FC Riedisheim (9)	0–2	AS Huningue (7)
250.	AS Hochstatt (11)	0–2	US Hirsingue (8)
251.	AS Lutterbach (9)	3–3 (3–5 p)	Entente Hagenbach-Balschwiller (10)
252.	Entente Oltingue Raedersdorf (10)	0–1	US Hésingue (8)
253.	RC Dannemarie (8)	0–2	FC Wintzfelden-Osenbach (8)
254.	FCRS Richwiller (8)	1–4	SS Zillisheim (8)
255.	RC Landser (12)	3–3 (3–1 p)	Alliance Folgensbourg Muespach (10)
256.	FC Traubach (10)	5–8	AS Anatolie Mulhouse (10)
257.	FC Hagenthal-Wentzwiller (8)	2–1	FC Uffheim (9)
258.	AS Durlinsdorf (11)	0–2	FC Kingersheim (7)
259.	Union Carspach-Hirtzbach (10)	0–1	FC Morschwiller-le-Bas (8)
260.	FC Kappelen (8)	1–3	Mulhouse Foot Réunis (7)

=== Third round ===
These matches were played on 14 and 15 September 2024.

Third Round Results: Grand Est
Tie no	Home team (Tier)	Score	Away team (Tier)
1.	FC Haybes (10)	2–1	ES Witry-les-Reims (9)
2.	AS Asfeld (7)	0–4	Olympique Charleville Prix Ardenne Métropole (5)
3.	FC Blagny-Carignan (8)	2–4	AS Saint-Brice-Courcelles (8)
4.	AS Tournes/Renwez/Les Mazures/Arreux/Montcornet (8)	0–1	FC Tinqueux Champagne (8)
5.	CA Villers-Semeuse (6)	1–3	FC Bogny (6)
6.	USC Lucquy (11)	0–3	Rethel SF (7)
7.	USC Nouvion-sur-Meuse (9)	0–0 (3–4 p)	SC Vivarois (9)
8.	Bétheny FC (8)	3–0	Nord Ardennes (9)
9.	AS Val de l'Aisne (8)	5–1	Cheveuges-Saint-Aignan CO (8)
10.	Espérance Rémoise (8)	1–3	CS Sedan Ardennes (7)
11.	AS Cernay-Berru-Lavannes (7)	2–1	US Bazeilles (8)
12.	EF Reims Sainte-Anne (6)	3–0	A.S. Saint Pierraise (Saint Pierre and Miquelon)
13.	AS Sud Champagne et Der (10)	1–5	ES Fagnières (6)
14.	Étoile Lusigny (10)	1–3	FC Nogentais (7)
15.	AS Droupt-Saint-Basle (10)	2–2 (8–7 p)	FC Côte des Blancs (7)
16.	FC Bréviandes (10)	0–8	Cormontreuil FC (6)
17.	SC Sézannais (8)	5–1	ES Nord Aubois (8)
18.	Vitry FC (7)	1–1 (3–2 p)	RC Épernay Champagne (6)
19.	RCS La Chapelle (7)	0–0 (9–10 p)	Romilly Champagne FC (8)
20.	AS Pont-Saint-Marie (10)	1–4	FC Saint-Meziery (6)
21.	ES Côteaux Sud (9)	0–1	Reims Murigny Franco Portugais (8)
22.	ES Pleurs (11)	0–2	Châlons FCO (7)
23.	Étoile Chapelaine (10)	1–2	US Oiry (9)
24.	FC Saint-Martin-sur-le-Pré/La Veuve/Recy (10)	1–0	FC Christo (7)
25.	AS Sarrey-Montigny (7)	2–3	SC Marnaval (6)
26.	US Rouvres Auberive (10)	0–2	DS Eurville-Bienville (8)
27.	ES Andelot-Rimaucourt-Bourdons (9)	1–3	Chaumont FC (6)
28.	Stade Chevillonnais (8)	3–1	FC Prez Bourmont (8)
29.	CO Langres (10)	1–2	Bar-sur-Aube FC (8)
30.	AS Chamouilley Roches-sur-Marne (10)	2–1	Foyer Barsequanais (8)
31.	ASPTT Chaumont (8)	1–4	US Éclaron (6)
32.	FC Bologne (9)	0–6	Entente Centre Ornain (7)
33.	CS Maranville-Rennepont (9)	0–3	Espérance Saint-Dizier (9)
34.	FC Haute Moselotte (9)	1–5	ES Golbey (7)
35.	ES Michelloise (11)	1–2	Bulgnéville Contrex Vittel FC (8)
36.	GS Haroué-Benney (8)	3–1	AS Girancourt-Dommartin-Chaumousey (8)
37.	AS Saint-Nabord (9)	0–1	GS Neuves-Maisons (6)
38.	FC Neufchâteau-Liffol (8)	3–3 (4–3 p)	FC Éloyes (7)
39.	ES Laneuveville (7)	1–0	US Vandœuvre (6)
40.	AS Ramonchamp (10)	3–1	AS Gérardmer (8)
41.	FC Amerey Xertigny (9)	0–3	SR Saint-Dié (7)
42.	Saulcy FC (10)	4–4 (0–3 p)	ES Avière Darnieulles (8)
43.	US Rosières-aux-Salines (9)	0–5	FC Lunéville (6)
44.	FC Dombasle-sur-Meurthe (8)	1–2	AC Blainville-Damelevières (8)
45.	FC Sainte-Marguerite (9)	0–7	US Raon-l'Étape (5)
46.	FC Dieulouard Marbache Belleville (8)	2–0	GSA Tomblaine (9)
47.	CS Blénod (8)	2–1	RC Champigneulles (6)
48.	Omnisports Frouard Pompey (9)	2–2 (6–5 p)	AS Pagny-sur-Moselle (6)
49.	AS Gondrevilley (8)	2–8	COS Villers (7)
50.	FC Pulnoy (8)	3–1	Toul JCA (9)
51.	AS Velaine-en-Haye (10)	1–12	ES Thaon (5)
52.	ES Heillecourt (7)	0–0 (5–4 p)	Jarville JF (6)
53.	FC Loisy (11)	1–2	Lorraine Vaucouleurs (9)
54.	GS Vézelise (10)	2–3	AS Ludres (8)
55.	AS Art-sur-Meuthe Bosserville Lenoncourt (11)	0–0 (3–1 p)	ES Custines-Malleloy (9)
56.	US Behonne-Longeville-en-Barois (7)	3–1	ENJ Val-de-Seille (8)
57.	AS Tréveray (9)	0–2	Entente Sorcy Void-Vacon (7)
58.	FC Devant-les-Ponts Metz (8)	5–1	AS Saint-Julien-lès-Metz (9)
59.	FC Novéant (9)	1–1 (4–5 p)	AS Metz Grange-aux-Bois (10)
60.	US Briey (8)	2–0	UL Plantières Metz (7)
61.	AS Clouange (8)	6–4 (Note: Tie reversed from original draw.)	Entente Gravelotte-Verneville (10)
62.	SC Moulins-lès-Metz (10)	1–1 (3–4 p)	AS Les Côteaux (8)
63.	Entente Vigneulles-Hannonville-Fresne (8)	1–4	ESAP Metz (8)
64.	JS Metz Scy-Chazelles (10)	4–0	FC Dieuze (10)
65.	RS Amanvillers (7)	1–1 (3–1 p)	APM Metz (6)
66.	RS Magny (7)	0–3	US Etain-Buzy (8)
67.	US Châtel Conquistadors (8)	0–3	CSO Amnéville (6)
68.	Athletic Cuvry Augny (8)	5–1	US Jarny (7)
69.	AS Entrange (11)	0–6	CA Boulay (7)
70.	US Oudrenne (10)	1–1 (1–3 p)	FC Hettange-Grande (7)
71.	Entente Bure-Boulange (10)	0–4	USAG Uckange (6)
72.	ES Marange-Silvange (8)	0–3	ES Villerupt-Thil (6)
73.	CS Bassin Ornais (9)	2–9	AS Algrange (7)
74.	AS Mercy-le-Bas (10)	0–0 (4–2 p)	US Illange (8)
75.	FC Vœlfling (11)	0–0 (1–3 p)	FC Hagondange (6)
76.	USB Longwy (9)	1–5	FC Yutz (7)
77.	RC Crusnes Audun (10)	1–0	AG Metzervisse (8)
78.	RS Serémange-Erzange (10)	0–1	ES Fameck (7)
79.	CS Godbrange (9)	1–1 (5–4 p)	ES Rosselange Vitry (7)
80.	FC Trémery (8)	0–1	ES Cons-Ugny Val de Chiers (9)
81.	SO Merlebach (7)	6–1	ES Macheren Petit-Ebersviller (8)
82.	AS Neunkirch (9)	0–0 (5–6 p)	FC Abreschviller (9)
83.	JS Wenheck (9)	0–4	Étoile Naborienne Saint-Avold (7)
84.	FC Hambach (9)	1–5	US Nousseviller (7)
85.	AS Kalhausen (9)	0–2	EFT Sarrebourg (9)
86.	SO Ippling (10)	0–0 (6–5 p)	US Behren-lès-Forbach (8)
87.	ES Lixing Vahl Laning (10)	0–10	SSEP Hombourg-Haut (6)
88.	AS Réding (8)	1–1 (2–3 p)	ES Rimling-Erching-Obergailbach (9)
89.	FC Sarrebourg (7)	2–0	US Farébersviller 05 (8)
90.	AS Le Val-de-Guéblange (9)	0–3	US Forbach (6)
91.	Union Soucht Goetzenbruck Meisenthal 2022 (9)	0–0 (3–4 p)	AS Bliesbruck (9)
92.	SR Creutzwald 03 (8)	1–0	Achen-Etting-Schmittviller (7)
93.	AS Freybouse-Frémestroff (10)	0–3	FC Freyming (8)
94.	FC Farschviller (10)	1–1 (1–4 p)	Entente Schorbach Hottviller Volmunster 13 (11)
95.	ASE Cité de l'Ill Strasbourg (9)	0–3	US Sarre-Union (5)
96.	AS Uhrwiller (9)	0–2	AS Ohlungen (7)
97.	FC Dossenheim-sur-Zinsel (9)	0–5	ASI Avenir (7)
98.	AS Platania Gundershoffen (10)	0–0 (9–8 p)	FC Obermodern (6)
99.	FC Schaffhouse-sur-Zorn (10)	2–1	AS Ingwiller/Menchhoffen (8)
100.	AS Weinbourg (11)	0–4	FC Durrenbach (9)
101.	US Wittersheim (8)	0–2	FC Schweighouse-sur-Moder (8)
102.	FA Val de Moder (9)	2–5	AS Butten-Diemeringen (7)
103.	AS Dingsheim-Griesheim (11)	0–10	US Reipertswiller (6)
104.	AS Hohengœft (10)	1–1 (3–5 p)	FC Wingersheim (8)
105.	SR Hoenheim (8)	0–0 (2–3 p)	US Oberlauterbach (6)
106.	FC Dambach/Neunhoffen (13)	0–9	FCE Schirrhein (7)
107.	La Wantzenau FC (10)	1–5	SS Weyersheim (6)
108.	SS Beinheim (10)	2–1	FC Soleil Bischheim (7)
109.	FC Saint-Etienne Seltz (8)	1–0	FC Kronenbourg Strasbourg (6)
110.	SC Rœschwoog (10)	4–1	FC Steinseltz (8)
111.	FC Weitbruch (9)	0–2	AS Gambsheim (9)
112.	US Preuschdorf-Langensoultzbach (8)	0–3	AS Hoerdt (7)
113.	US Surbourg (11)	0–1	AS Betschdorf (9)
114.	US Kaltenhouse-Marienthal (8)	5–0	FC Scheibenhard (7)
115.	AS Marckolsheim (9)	1–4	US Oberschaeffolsheim (8)
116.	AS Wisches-Russ-Lutzelhouse (11)	1–0	CS Fegersheim (9)
117.	FC Rosheim (11)	0–6	ES Molsheim-Ernolsheim (7)
118.	FC Oberhausbergen (10)	0–8	FCO Strasbourg Koenigshoffen 06 (5)
119.	CS Neuhof Strasbourg (9)	1–0	FC Breuschwickersheim (10)
120.	SC Dinsheim (12)	1–9	ASL Robertsau (7)
121.	AJF Hautepierre (8)	2–9	Association Still-Mutzig (6)
122.	FC Ecrivains-Schiltigheim-Bischheim (10)	1–1 (4–2 p)	AS Neudorf (7)
123.	FC Eschau (8)	3–0	AS Holtzheim (9)
124.	FC Dahlenheim (7)	1–2	FCSR Obernai (7)
125.	FC Ostheim-Houssen (8)	5–1	AS Berrwiller-Hartsmannswiller (7)
126.	Strasbourg Université Club (10)	0–3	FA Illkirch Graffenstaden (6)
127.	ES Stotzheim (10)	0–6	AS Erstein (7)
128.	AS Guémar (8)	2–0	AS Menora Strasbourg (7)
129.	FC Geispolsheim 01 (7)	0–3	SR Colmar (5)
130.	AS Heiligenstein (11)	0–3	FC Ingersheim (9)
131.	AS Portugais Sélestat (10)	2–1	US Scherwiller (7)
132.	FC Bennwihr (9)	1–4	Racing HW 96 (8)
133.	AS Natzwiller (11)	1–1 (8–9 p)	FC Rossfeld (8)
134.	FC Kingersheim (7)	1–2	AS Sundhoffen (6)
135.	FC Herrlisheim (9)	1–1 (0–3 p)	AS Aspach-le-Haut (10)
136.	FC Ensisheim (10)	0–2	FC Pays Rhénan (8)
137.	FC Baldersheim (9)	5–1	AS Pfaffenheim (9)
138.	FC Hirtzfelden (8)	1–3	ASL Kœtzingue (6)
139.	US Wittenheim (7)	4–0	AGIIR Florival (8)
140.	Mouloudia Mulhouse (7)	0–7	FC Illhaeusern (7)
141.	AS Blotzheim (7)	5–0	FC Rouffach (8)
142.	SR Bergheim (11)	2–2 (3–2 p)	FC Heiteren (9)
143.	AS Turckheim (10)	0–1	FC Wintzfelden-Osenbach (8)
144.	AS Huningue (7)	1–4	FC Hégenheim (6)
145.	Mulhouse Foot Réunis (7)	1–2	FC Hagenthal-Wentzwiller (8)
146.	FC Sausheim (9)	1–3	FC Saint-Louis Neuweg (7)
147.	FC Roderen (11)	6–2	US Hirsingue (8)
148.	SS Zillisheim (8)	2–0	FC Habsheim (9)
149.	US Hésingue (8)	2–6	AS Theodore Ruelisheim Wittenheim (8)
150.	Entente Hagenbach-Balschwiller (10)	1–3	ASCA Wittelsheim (8)
151.	RC Landser (12)	0–11	AS Illzach Modenheim (6)
152.	FC Fessenheim (8)	2–2 (3–4 p)	FC Morschwiller-le-Bas (8)
153.	AS Anatolie Mulhouse (10)	0–3	FC Mulhouse (6)

=== Fourth round ===
These matches were played on 28 and 29 September 2024.

Fourth Round Results: Grand Est
Tie no	Home team (Tier)	Score	Away team (Tier)
1.	Reims Murigny Franco Portugais (8)	4–3	Bétheny FC (8)
2.	FC Haybes (10)	2–5	FC Bogny (6)
3.	FC Saint-Martin-sur-le-Pré/La Veuve/Recy (10)	0–2	Olympique Charleville Prix Ardenne Métropole (5)
4.	ES Fagnières (6)	2–1	Rethel SF (7)
5.	CS Sedan Ardennes (7)	4–0	AS Val de l'Aisne (8)
6.	FC Tinqueux Champagne (8)	4–0	SC Vivarois (9)
7.	Cormontreuil FC (6)	2–2 (3–1 p)	EF Reims Sainte-Anne (6)
8.	AS Saint-Brice-Courcelles (8)	0–0 (5–6 p)	AS Cernay-Berru-Lavannes (7)
9.	US Oiry (9)	0–0 (3–4 p)	US Éclaron (6)
10.	Romilly Champagne FC (8)	0–0 (5–3 p)	Bar-sur-Aube FC (8)
11.	Espérance Saint-Dizier (9)	0–6	FC Saint-Meziery (6)
12.	SC Marnaval (6)	3–1	FC Nogentais (7)
13.	AS Droupt-Saint-Basle (10)	1–1 (6–5 p)	Vitry FC (7)
14.	Châlons FCO (7)	0–2	SC Sézannais (8)
15.	DS Eurville-Bienville (8)	2–1	Stade Chevillonnais (8)
16.	AS Chamouilley Roches-sur-Marne (10)	0–5	Chaumont FC (6)
17.	Lorraine Vaucouleurs (9)	0–2	Entente Centre Ornain (7)
18.	Entente Sorcy Void-Vacon (7)	0–1	GS Neuves-Maisons (6)
19.	AS Art-sur-Meuthe Bosserville Lenoncourt (11)	1–3	Bulgnéville Contrex Vittel FC (8)
20.	ES Avière Darnieulles (8)	0–2	COS Villers (7)
21.	AC Blainville-Damelevières (8)	0–0 (5–4 p)	FC Neufchâteau-Liffol (8)
22.	AS Ramonchamp (10)	0–1	US Behonne-Longeville-en-Barois (7)
23.	SR Saint-Dié (7)	5–1	AS Ludres (8)
24.	ES Golbey (7)	3–1	ES Heillecourt (7)
25.	GS Haroué-Benney (8)	0–1	SAS Épinal (4)
26.	ES Laneuveville (7)	1–4	ES Thaon (5)
27.	FC Pulnoy (8)	0–2	FC Lunéville (6)
28.	AS Metz Grange-aux-Bois (10)	0–14	US Thionville Lusitanos (4)
29.	CSO Amnéville (6)	1–3	FC Hagondange (6)
30.	FC Yutz (7)	0–1	RS Amanvillers (7)
31.	AS Clouange (8)	2–2 (5–6 p)	CS Blénod (8)
32.	ES Fameck (7)	0–3	USAG Uckange (6)
33.	AS Mercy-le-Bas (10)	0–3	ES Villerupt-Thil (6)
34.	Omnisports Frouard Pompey (9)	1–1 (3–4 p)	FC Hettange-Grande (7)
35.	FC Dieulouard Marbache Belleville (8)	4–3	CS Godbrange (9)
36.	US Etain-Buzy (8)	2–0	US Briey (8)
37.	JS Metz Scy-Chazelles (10)	0–3	AS Algrange (7)
38.	ES Cons-Ugny Val de Chiers (9)	1–5	RC Crusnes Audun (10)
39.	FC Abreschviller (9)	1–2	Étoile Naborienne Saint-Avold (7)
40.	AS Les Côteaux (8)	2–1	EFT Sarrebourg (9)
41.	SO Merlebach (7)	0–8	US Raon-l'Étape (5)
42.	Entente Schorbach Hottviller Volmunster 13 (11)	1–13	SSEP Hombourg-Haut (6)
43.	ES Rimling-Erching-Obergailbach (9)	0–0 (0–3 p)	FC Devant-les-Ponts Metz (8)
44.	FC Freyming (8)	4–0	Athletic Cuvry Augny (8)
45.	SR Creutzwald 03 (8)	0–5	Sarreguemines FC (5)
46.	ESAP Metz (8)	2–1	FC Sarrebourg (7)
47.	SO Ippling (10)	0–7	CA Boulay (7)
48.	AS Bliesbruck (9)	0–3	US Forbach (6)
49.	FC Durrenbach (9)	2–2 (2–3 p)	FCE Schirrhein (7)
50.	FC Schaffhouse-sur-Zorn (10)	1–2	FC Saint-Etienne Seltz (8)
51.	ASI Avenir (7)	1–3	SS Weyersheim (6)
52.	AS Platania Gundershoffen (10)	0–2	FCSR Haguenau (4)
53.	AS Ohlungen (7)	0–3	US Sarre-Union (5)
54.	SC Rœschwoog (10)	2–1	SS Beinheim (10)
55.	AS Butten-Diemeringen (7)	0–3	US Oberlauterbach (6)
56.	FC Schweighouse-sur-Moder (8)	0–4	US Reipertswiller (6)
57.	AS Hoerdt (7)	1–1 (5–4 p)	US Kaltenhouse-Marienthal (8)
58.	AS Gambsheim (9)	1–2	US Nousseviller (7)
59.	AS Betschdorf (9)	1–1 (3–5 p)	FC Wingersheim (8)
60.	ES Molsheim-Ernolsheim (7)	3–4	AS Guémar (8)
61.	CS Neuhof Strasbourg (9)	0–6	FA Illkirch Graffenstaden (6)
62.	AS Wisches-Russ-Lutzelhouse (11)	2–3	ASL Robertsau (7)
63.	US Oberschaeffolsheim (8)	0–2	AS Sundhoffen (6)
64.	FC Rossfeld (8)	2–4	FCO Strasbourg Koenigshoffen 06 (5)
65.	FC Ingersheim (9)	3–3 (4–5 p)	FC Ostheim-Houssen (8)
66.	AS Erstein (7)	0–1	SR Colmar (5)
67.	AS Portugais Sélestat (10)	0–3	Association Still-Mutzig (6)
68.	FCSR Obernai (7)	4–2	Racing HW 96 (8)
69.	FC Ecrivains-Schiltigheim-Bischheim (10)	0–1	FC Eschau (8)
70.	ASCA Wittelsheim (8)	2–4	US Wittenheim (7)
71.	AS Theodore Ruelisheim Wittenheim (8)	3–2	FC Baldersheim (9)
72.	FC Illhaeusern (7)	0–3	ASC Biesheim (4)
73.	AS Aspach-le-Haut (10)	1–0	FC Morschwiller-le-Bas (8)
74.	SS Zillisheim (8)	0–5	FC Mulhouse (6)
75.	FC Roderen (11)	1–9	FC Pays Rhénan (8)
76.	SR Bergheim (11)	0–4	ASL Kœtzingue (6)
77.	AS Illzach Modenheim (6)	1–1 (4–2 p)	FC Saint-Louis Neuweg (7)
78.	FC Hagenthal-Wentzwiller (8)	5–4	FC Hégenheim (6)
79.	FC Wintzfelden-Osenbach (8)	1–2	AS Blotzheim (7)

=== Fifth round ===
These matches were played on 12 and 13 October 2024.

Fifth Round Results: Grand Est
Tie no	Home team (Tier)	Score	Away team (Tier)
1.	AS Guémar (8)	1–4	FCO Strasbourg Koenigshoffen 06 (5)
2.	AS Blotzheim (7)	3–2	AS Illzach Modenheim (6)
3.	FC Eschau (8)	0–3	ASC Biesheim (4)
4.	FC Hagenthal-Wentzwiller (8)	1–5	ASL Kœtzingue (6)
5.	AS Sundhoffen (6)	0–3	SR Colmar (5)
6.	US Wittenheim (7)	1–5	Association Still-Mutzig (6)
7.	AS Aspach-le-Haut (10)	2–0	FC Ostheim-Houssen (8)
8.	ASL Robertsau (7)	1–2	FA Illkirch Graffenstaden (6)
9.	FCSR Obernai (7)	1–0	AS Theodore Ruelisheim Wittenheim (8)
10.	FC Pays Rhénan (8)	1–3	FC Mulhouse (6)
11.	AS Les Côteaux (8)	0–3	US Sarre-Union (5)
12.	FC Devant-les-Ponts Metz (8)	1–6	SSEP Hombourg-Haut (6)
13.	US Reipertswiller (6)	3–5	Sarreguemines FC (5)
14.	US Nousseviller (7)	3–1	AS Hoerdt (7)
15.	Étoile Naborienne Saint-Avold (7)	2–1	SS Weyersheim (6)
16.	FCE Schirrhein (7)	0–1	FC Freyming (8)
17.	US Forbach (6)	2–2 (4–5 p)	CA Boulay (7)
18.	FC Wingersheim (8)	0–2	US Oberlauterbach (6)
19.	FC Saint-Etienne Seltz (8)	1–1 (9–10 p)	ESAP Metz (8)
20.	SC Rœschwoog (10)	1–3	FCSR Haguenau (4)
21.	AS Droupt-Saint-Basle (10)	0–9	US Raon-l'Étape (5)
22.	DS Eurville-Bienville (8)	0–5	AS Nancy Lorraine (3)
23.	Romilly Champagne FC (8)	0–7	SR Saint-Dié (7)
24.	Entente Centre Ornain (7)	2–4	FC Lunéville (6)
25.	AC Blainville-Damelevières (8)	2–1	US Éclaron (6)
26.	GS Neuves-Maisons (6)	0–0 (3–5 p)	FC Saint-Meziery (6)
27.	Bulgnéville Contrex Vittel FC (8)	0–6	COS Villers (7)
28.	US Behonne-Longeville-en-Barois (7)	0–4	SAS Épinal (4)
29.	SC Marnaval (6)	1–1 (3–5 p)	ES Golbey (7)
30.	SC Sézannais (8)	1–6	Chaumont FC (6)
31.	CS Sedan Ardennes (7)	1–4	ES Thaon (5)
32.	AS Cernay-Berru-Lavannes (7)	0–4	US Thionville Lusitanos (4)
33.	Olympique Charleville Prix Ardenne Métropole (5)	5–0	ES Fagnières (6)
34.	RC Crusnes Audun (10)	0–4	Reims Murigny Franco Portugais (8)
35.	AS Algrange (7)	0–1	CS Blénod (8)
36.	FC Tinqueux Champagne (8)	1–0	USAG Uckange (6)
37.	FC Bogny (6)	0–0 (4–2 p)	Cormontreuil FC (6)
38.	ES Villerupt-Thil (6)	1–1 (5–6 p)	FC Hettange-Grande (7)
39.	FC Dieulouard Marbache Belleville (8)	2–1	US Etain-Buzy (8)
40.	FC Hagondange (6)	1–0	RS Amanvillers (7)

=== Sixth round ===
These matches were played on 26 and 27 October 2024.

Sixth Round Results: Grand Est
Tie no	Home team (Tier)	Score	Away team (Tier)
1.	SR Colmar (5)	2–1	FC Mulhouse (6)
2.	AS Aspach-le-Haut (10)	2–5	FCSR Obernai (7)
3.	FA Illkirch Graffenstaden (6)	5–2	Étoile Naborienne Saint-Avold (7)
4.	ESAP Metz (8)	0–4	Association Still-Mutzig (6)
5.	ASL Kœtzingue (6)	2–2 (4–5 p)	US Nousseviller (7)
6.	CA Boulay (7)	2–0	Sarreguemines FC (5)
7.	FC Freyming (8)	3–1	AS Blotzheim (7)
8.	US Sarre-Union (5)	2–1	FCO Strasbourg Koenigshoffen 06 (5)
9.	SSEP Hombourg-Haut (6)	0–1	ASC Biesheim (4)
10.	US Oberlauterbach (6)	0–3	FCSR Haguenau (4)
11.	AC Blainville-Damelevières (8)	0–2	Chaumont FC (6)
12.	COS Villers (7)	0–1	SAS Épinal (4)
13.	Olympique Charleville Prix Ardenne Métropole (5)	4–0	FC Hagondange (6)
14.	FC Saint-Meziery (6)	1–1 (4–5 p)	US Thionville Lusitanos (4)
15.	CS Blénod (8)	2–0	Reims Murigny Franco Portugais (8)
16.	AS Nancy Lorraine (3)	12–0 (Note: Tie reversed from original draw, due to security concerns.)	FC Dieulouard Marbache Belleville (8)
17.	FC Tinqueux Champagne (8)	1–6	FC Lunéville (6)
18.	SR Saint-Dié (7)	0–2	FC Hettange-Grande (7)
19.	ES Thaon (5)	4–0	FC Bogny (6)
20.	ES Golbey (7)	1–6	US Raon-l'Étape (5)
