= Jacky Planchard =

French football player and manager (born 1947)

Personal information
- Full name: Jacques Planchard
- Date of birth: 3 February 1947 (age 79)
- Place of birth: Tours, France
- Height: 1.78 m (5 ft 10 in)
- Position: Goalkeeper

Senior career*
Years	Team	Apps	(Gls)
1972–1973	Blois	15	(0)
1973–1975	Paris Saint-Germain	14	(0)
1975–1976	Lille	0	(0)
1977–1978	Amboise		
1978–1981	Saint-Cyr-sur-Loire		
Total		29+	(0+)

Managerial career
- 1977–1978: Amboise
- 1978–1981: Saint-Cyr-sur-Loire
- 1984: Joué-lès-Tours (youth)
- * Club domestic league appearances and goals

Jacques "Jacky" Planchard (born 3 February 1947) is a French former professional football player and manager.

== Early life ==
Jacques Planchard was born on 3 February 1947 in Tours, Centre-Val de Loire.

Planchard was a big fan of horses before becoming a footballer; he was a jockey in the 1960s, and also become an equestrian instructor.

== Career ==
Planchard arrived at Paris Saint-Germain from Blois in 1973 at the age of 26. He made his first appearance for the club in a 0–0 draw against Mulhouse on 24 February 1974. Planchard was notably the goalkeeper who played in both of the play-off matches between PSG and Valenciennes, helping the Parisian club reach the Division 1. Paris lost the away match by a score of 2–1, but made a comeback in the second leg after being 2–4 down on aggregate, eventually winning the match 4–2 and the tie 5–4.

On 9 August 1974, Planchard started for PSG in a match against Reims; he conceded 6 goals in 45 minutes as the match ended in a 6–1 victory for Reims, which would be Planchard's final match of his professional football career.

Planchard suffered a fracture to his leg while playing with Lille, which put an end to his career. He became a player-manager for amateur clubs Amboise and Saint-Cyr-sur-Loire. In 1981, he became a PE teacher, before training youth players at Joué-lès-Tours.

== After football ==
After football, Planchard worked in the transportation sector of the company Europe-Express. He retired in March 2007.

== Career statistics ==
Appearances and goals by club, season and competition
Club	Season	League			Cup		Total	
Club	Season	Division	Apps	Goals	Apps	Goals	Apps	Goals
Blois	1972–73	Division 2	15	0	0	0	15	0
Paris Saint-Germain	1973–74	Division 2	12	0	8	0	20	0
Paris Saint-Germain	1974–75	Division 1	2	0	1	0	3	0
Paris Saint-Germain	Total		14	0	9	0	23	0
Career total			29	0	9	0	38	0
