= Armando Monteiro (footballer) =

Brazilian footballer (1950–2008)

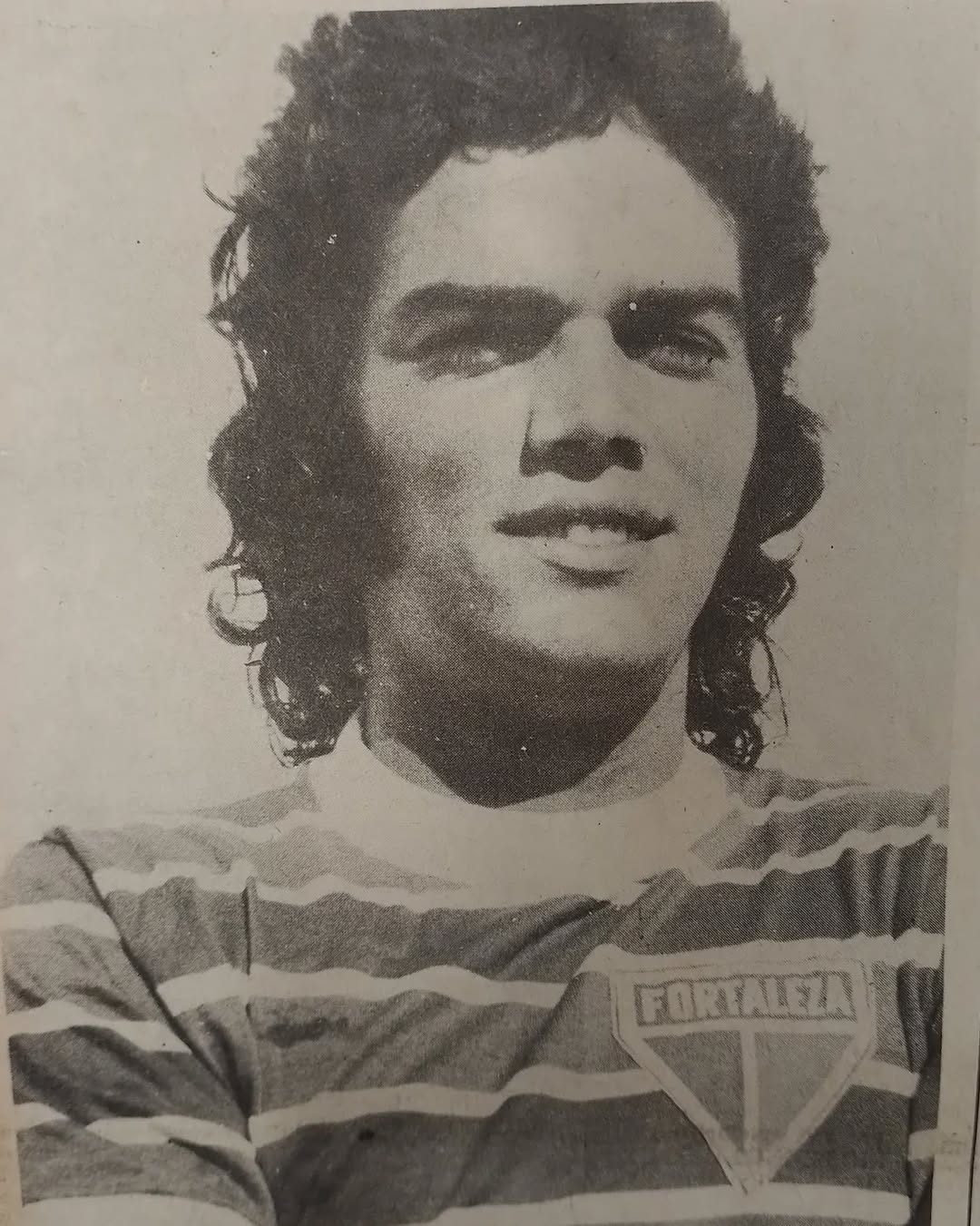
- Monteiro in 1973

Personal information
- Full name: Armando Monteiro
- Date of birth: 31 March 1950
- Place of birth: Rio de Janeiro, Federal District, Brazil
- Date of death: 22 October 2008 (aged 58)
- Place of death: Mougins, Provence-Alpes-Côte d'Azur, France
- Height: 1.87 m (6 ft 2 in)
- Position: Left winger

Youth career
- 1966–1967: Flamengo

Senior career*
| Years | Team | Apps | (Gls) |
- Palmeiras
| 1973 | Botafogo | | |
| 1973 | Fortaleza | 1 | (0) |
| 1973–1974 | Paris Saint-Germain | 9 | (5) |
| 1974–1975 | Cannes | | |
- * Club domestic league appearances and goals

Armando Monteiro (31 March 1950 – 22 October 2008) was a Brazilian footballer and musician. Sometimes known simply as Armando, he played as a left winger for Paris Saint-Germain, retrospectively recognized as being the second Brazilian to play for the club.

== Career ==
Monteiro grew up in the beachfront neighborhood of Botafogo that would later influence him to play for Botafogo de Futebol e Regatas in 1973. He also played for Flamengo during his youth career as well as make a single appearance for Fortaleza in a friendly against Juventus on 17 March where he was subbed out after 30 minutes. He also had a brief spell with Palmeiras.

Despite a modest performance in the 1973 season, Paris Saint-Germain manager and former footballer Just Fontaine who was fighting for promotion to the French Division 1, saw enough potential in Monteiro to where he would ask to meet with the footballer with Monteiro flying out to Paris without his father's permission. Fontaine later signed him to the senior squad as during his trial, Monteiro would mention his prior careers with Flamengo and Botafogo. This made Monteiro the second Brazilian footballer to play for the club following Brazilian international Joel Camargo with Abel Braga following him a few seasons later. He played during the 1973–74 season with his debut match in a 2–0 victory against Gueugnon on 27 October 1973.

His most memorable contribution for the club came during a home match against Red Star with Monteiro scoring the header on 10 November. He went on to play in 9 games as well as score 5 goals which made Monteiro hold the title of the most successful Brazilian player from an appearance-to-goal ratio until Neymar later setting a new record. He left the club by the end of the season following the club successfully reaching the top-flight of French football as he then played for Cannes in the following season before retiring from football.

== Later life ==
Monteiro chose to remain in France following his retirement, moving to the south and later form a duo with Eduardo Filho to form the Samba group Brasa Brasil and later became a conductor for samba for more than 20 years. He lived in Saint-Tropez alongside fellow Brazilian footballer Paulo Cézar Caju before living at Mougins until his death on 31 March 2008.
