= Pierre Bajoc =

French football player and manager (born 1955)

Personal information
- Date of birth: 27 April 1955 (age 71)
- Place of birth: Le Lamentin, Martinique
- Height: 1.74 m (5 ft 9 in)
- Position: Defender

Youth career
- Aiglon du Lamentin
- L'Éclair de Rivière-Salée

Senior career*
Years	Team	Apps	(Gls)
1973–1980	Paris Saint-Germain	15	(0)
1980–1985	Le Mans		

Managerial career
- Connerré
- Sainte-Jamme-sur-Sarthe
- La Milesse
- * Club domestic league appearances and goals

Pierre Bajoc (born 27 April 1955) is a French former professional football player and manager.

== Playing career ==
Bajoc began playing football in his hometown of Le Lamentin in Martinique. He played for Aiglon du Lamentin and L'Éclair de Rivière-Salée in his youth before joining Paris Saint-Germain in 1973, at the age of 18. Guy Nosibor also joined PSG from L'Éclair de Rivière-Salée that year.

On 23 September 1973, Bajoc made his debut for PSG in a 1–1 draw against Nevers. He played his final match for the club on 19 January 1980, a 3–1 loss to Laval. Bajoc left PSG in 1980 to join third division Le Mans. He stayed at the club until his retirement in 1985 despite being relegated to the fourth tier in 1981.

== Managerial career ==
After his retirement in 1985, Bajoc managed three different amateur clubs in the Sarthe department of France, in the towns of Connerré, Sainte-Jamme-sur-Sarthe, and La Milesse.

== After football ==
Later in his life, Bajoc worked for the city of Le Mans.

== Career statistics ==
Appearances and goals by club, season and competition
Club	Season	League			Cup		Total	
Club	Season	Division	Apps	Goals	Apps	Goals	Apps	Goals
Paris Saint-Germain	1973–74	Division 2	1	0	1	0	2	0
Paris Saint-Germain	1974–75	Division 1	0	0	0	0	0	0
Paris Saint-Germain	1975–76	Division 1	0	0	0	0	0	0
Paris Saint-Germain	1976–77	Division 1	1	0	0	0	1	0
Paris Saint-Germain	1977–78	Division 1	9	0	0	0	9	0
Paris Saint-Germain	1978–79	Division 1	3	0	0	0	3	0
Paris Saint-Germain	1979–80	Division 1	1	0	0	0	1	0
Career total			15	0	1	0	16	0
