= CS Vittel =

Defunct football club in Vittel, France

Vittel
- Full name: Club Sportif Vittellois
- Founded: 1935
- Dissolved: 2015

Club Sportif Vittellois was a football club based in Vittel, France. It was founded in 1935, and ceased to exist in 2015 after a merger with Contrex FC and JS Bulgnéville, creating Bulgnéville Contrex Vittel FC.

== History ==
Club Sportif Vittellois was founded in 1935. The club played in the Division 2 in the 1973–74 season, the highest tier they reached in the French football pyramid. However, the team finished last in their group, synonymous with relegation to the Division 3. In 1977, the club was relegated from the Division 3, falling to the Division d'Honneur. Vittel would never play at a national level again.

In 2015, CS Vittel merged with Contrex FC and JS Bulgnéville to create Bulgnéville Contrex Vittel FC.

=== Managerial history ===
- 1961–1962: (France) Antoine Jurilli
- 1974–1975: (France) Jean-Marie Lawniczak
- 1979–1984: (France) Jean Deloffre

== Honours ==
CS Vittel honours
Honour	No.	Years
Division 3	1	1972–73
Division d'Honneur Lorraine	1	1969–70
