= Guy Nosibor =

French football player and manager (born 1954)

Personal information
- Date of birth: 22 July 1954 (age 72)
- Place of birth: Rivière-Salée, Martinique, France
- Height: 1.72 m (5 ft 8 in)
- Positions: Forward; right winger

Youth career
- L'Éclair de Rivière-Salée

Senior career*
Years	Team	Apps	(Gls)
1973–1979	Paris Saint-Germain	32	(6)
1977–1978	→ Angoulême (loan)	28	(6)
1979–1982	Rennes	111	(22)
1982–1983	Corbeil-Essonnes	33	(5)
1983–1985	Grenoble	58	(4)
1985–1987	Le Puy	46	(3)
1987–1989	Arles		
Total		308+	(46+)

Managerial career
- Menton
- * Club domestic league appearances and goals

Guy Nosibor (born 22 July 1954) is a French former professional football player and manager. As a player, he was a forward and right winger.

== Playing career ==
Nosibor was born in Rivière-Salée in Martinique. He was a youth player of his hometown club L'Éclair de Rivière-Salée before joining Paris Saint-Germain in 1973. Pierre Bajoc, also playing for L'Éclair de Rivière-Salée at the time, joined PSG the same year. From 1973 to 1979, Nosibor would go on to make 42 appearances and score 6 goals across all competitions for the Parisian club. However, he did play for Angoulême on loan during the 1977–78 season.

In 1979, Nosibor joined Rennes, the club at which he would make the most appearances during his career. He continued his career at Corbeil-Essonnes, Grenoble, Le Puy, and Arles before retiring in 1989.

== Managerial career ==
After retiring, Nosibor became manager of Menton.
