= Bernard Ducuing =

French footballer (1950–2024)

Personal information
- Date of birth: 19 May 1950
- Place of birth: Provins, France
- Date of death: 3 January 2024 (aged 73)
- Height: 1.71 m (5 ft 7 in)
- Positions: Midfielder; forward

Youth career
- ?–1970: Champigny-Coeuilly

Senior career*
Years	Team	Apps	(Gls)
1970–1975	Red Star		
1975–1978	Reims	92	(9)
1978–1984	Montpellier		
- * Club domestic league appearances and goals

Bernard Ducuing (19 May 1950 – 3 January 2024) was a French footballer who played as a midfielder and a forward.

== Biography ==
Born in Provins on 19 May 1950, Ducuing played professional football in the 1970s and 1980s. He notably played for Red Star, Reims, and Montpellier, playing a total of 199 matches in Division 1, scoring 22 goals.

Ducuing died on 3 January 2024, at the age of 73.
