= Jean Deloffre =

French footballer and manager (born 1939)

Personal information
- Date of birth: 5 October 1939 (age 87)
- Place of birth: Combles, France
- Height: 1.73 m (5 ft 8 in)
- Position: Midfielder

Senior career*
Years	Team	Apps	(Gls)
1957–1958	Abbeville		
1958–1965	Lens	158	(58)
1965–1969	Angers	148	(51)
1969–1970	Nice	25	(6)
1970–1972	Angoulême	30	(1)
1972–1973	Avignon	34	(8)
1973–1975	Paris Saint-Germain	43	(3)
1975–1976	Grenoble		
Total		438+	(127+)

International career
1967	France	1	(0)

Managerial career
- 1975–1978: Grenoble
- 1979–1984: Vittel
- * Club domestic league appearances and goals

Jean Deloffre (born 5 October 1939) is a French former professional footballer and manager. As a player, he was a midfielder, and he played for the France national team in 1967.

== Managerial career ==
Deloffre coached Grenoble and Vittel after his playing career.

== Honours ==
Lens

- Coupe Charles Drago: 1959, 1960, 1965

Angers

- Division 2: 1968–69

Nice

- Division 2: 1969–70
- Challenge des Champions: 1970
