= Christian Verrier =

French footballer (1952–2026)

Personal information
- Date of birth: 4 October 1952
- Place of birth: Châteauroux, France
- Date of death: 25 April 2026 (aged 73)
- Height: 1.69 m (5 ft 7 in)
- Position: Forward

Youth career
- ?–1971: Châteauroux

Senior career*
Years	Team	Apps	(Gls)
1971–1981	Châteauroux	271	(39)
1981–1982	FC Bourges		
- * Club domestic league appearances and goals

Christian Verrier (French: [kʁistjˈɑ̃ vɛʁjˈe]; 4 October 1952 – 25 April 2026) was a French footballer who played as a forward.

Verrier spent almost his entire career with Châteauroux, though he had a brief stint with FC Bourges in 1981–82.

Verrier died on 25 April 2026, at the age of 73.
