= 1973–74 French Division 2 =

35th season of the second-tier football league in France

Division 2
- Season: 1973–74
- Champions: Lille
- Promoted: Lille; Red Star; Paris Saint-Germain
- Relegated: Poitiers; Le Mans; La Rochelle; Ajaccio; Nevers; Arles-Avignon; Vittel

The 1973–74 French Division 2 was the 33rd season since its establishment. It was constituted by two groups (A and B) with 18 clubs each. The winners of each group won promotion to the 1974–75 French Division 1. Additionally, the winners met in a two-legged championship play–off. The victor was crowned champion and awarded the trophy. Meanwhile, the runners-up of both groups faced each other in a two-legged play-off, with the victor claiming the last promotion spot. On the other hand, the bottom three clubs of each group were relegated to the 1974–75 French Division 3, while Ajaccio abandoned its professional status and joined them.

The season began on 1 July 1973 and ended on 5 June 1974. The winter break was in effect from 22 December 1973 to 12 January 1974. Two points were awarded for a win, with no points for a loss. If the match was drawn, each team received one point. Likewise, this season was the first time that bonus points were awarded: any team scoring three or more goals in a match received an additional point. During the play–offs, if the aggregate score was tied after two legs, the match was decided by extra time and/or penalty shootout.

== League tables ==
=== Group A ===
| Pos | Team | Pld | W | D | L | GF | GA | GD | BP | Pts | Promotion or relegation |
|---|---|---|---|---|---|---|---|---|---|---|---|
| 1 | Lille (C, P) | 34 | 24 | 8 | 2 | 68 | 21 | +47 | 11 | 67 | Promotion to 1974–75 French Division 1 Qualification to the Finale de la Division 2 |
| 2 | Valenciennes | 34 | 21 | 7 | 6 | 78 | 29 | +49 | 15 | 64 | Qualification for Division 1 Playoffs |
| 3 | Rouen | 34 | 18 | 6 | 10 | 59 | 31 | +28 | 14 | 56 | |
| 4 | Boulogne | 34 | 16 | 10 | 8 | 58 | 39 | +19 | 11 | 53 | |
| 5 | Laval | 34 | 16 | 10 | 8 | 54 | 40 | +14 | 6 | 48 | |
| 6 | Lorient | 34 | 14 | 10 | 10 | 50 | 34 | +16 | 7 | 45 | |
| 7 | Besançon | 34 | 14 | 8 | 12 | 53 | 50 | +3 | 5 | 41 | |
| 8 | Dunkerque | 34 | 13 | 7 | 14 | 49 | 50 | −1 | 7 | 40 | |
| 9 | Brest | 34 | 13 | 9 | 12 | 41 | 43 | −2 | 2 | 37 | |
| 10 | Bourges | 34 | 10 | 11 | 13 | 36 | 54 | −18 | 4 | 35 | |
| 11 | Chaumont | 34 | 9 | 12 | 13 | 45 | 58 | −13 | 4 | 34 | |
| 12 | Montluçon | 34 | 11 | 5 | 18 | 52 | 61 | −9 | 6 | 33 | |
| 13 | Cambrai | 34 | 11 | 9 | 14 | 42 | 55 | −13 | 2 | 33 | |
| 14 | Blois | 34 | 10 | 9 | 15 | 36 | 52 | −16 | 4 | 33 | |
| 15 | Hazebrouck | 34 | 10 | 8 | 16 | 45 | 54 | −9 | 4 | 32 | |
| 16 | Poitiers (R) | 34 | 10 | 7 | 17 | 43 | 61 | −18 | 5 | 32 | Relegation to 1974–75 French Division 3 |
| 17 | Le Mans (R) | 34 | 5 | 8 | 21 | 29 | 63 | −34 | 5 | 23 | Relegation to 1974–75 French Division 3 |
| 18 | ES La Rochelle (R) | 34 | 5 | 8 | 21 | 29 | 72 | −43 | 0 | 18 | Relegation to 1974–75 French Division 3 |

Rules for classification: 1) points; 2) goal difference; 3) number of goals scored.
(C) Champions; (P) Promoted; (R) Relegated

=== Group B ===
| Pos | Team | Pld | W | D | L | GF | GA | GD | BP | Pts | Promotion or relegation |
|---|---|---|---|---|---|---|---|---|---|---|---|
| 1 | Red Star (P) | 34 | 19 | 12 | 3 | 71 | 29 | +42 | 11 | 61 | 1974–75 French Division 1 Championship play-offs |
| 2 | Paris Saint-Germain (P) | 34 | 19 | 6 | 9 | 70 | 42 | +28 | 13 | 57 | 1974–75 French Division 1 Promotion play-offs |
| 3 | Toulouse | 34 | 17 | 5 | 12 | 64 | 42 | +22 | 9 | 48 | |
| 4 | Avignon | 34 | 15 | 10 | 9 | 47 | 33 | +14 | 6 | 46 | |
| 5 | Toulon | 34 | 15 | 8 | 11 | 50 | 39 | +11 | 8 | 46 | |
| 6 | CA Mantes-la-Ville | 34 | 14 | 7 | 13 | 47 | 45 | +2 | 4 | 39 | |
| 7 | Ajaccio (R) | 34 | 12 | 9 | 13 | 46 | 44 | +2 | 6 | 39 | 1974–75 French Division 3 |
| 8 | Cannes | 34 | 11 | 12 | 11 | 39 | 42 | −3 | 5 | 39 | |
| 9 | Angoulême | 34 | 13 | 8 | 13 | 45 | 49 | −4 | 5 | 39 | |
| 10 | Mulhouse | 34 | 12 | 7 | 15 | 49 | 56 | −7 | 7 | 38 | |
| 11 | Entente BFN | 34 | 11 | 9 | 14 | 42 | 48 | −6 | 5 | 36 | |
| 12 | Sète | 34 | 13 | 8 | 13 | 30 | 51 | −21 | 2 | 36 | |
| 13 | Châteauroux | 34 | 10 | 10 | 14 | 43 | 47 | −4 | 5 | 35 | |
| 14 | Gueugnon | 34 | 10 | 9 | 15 | 46 | 56 | −10 | 5 | 34 | |
| 15 | Béziers Hérault | 34 | 11 | 8 | 15 | 35 | 46 | −11 | 4 | 34 | |
| 16 | Nevers (R) | 34 | 10 | 10 | 14 | 37 | 49 | −12 | 4 | 34 | 1974–75 French Division 3 |
| 17 | Arles-Avignon (R) | 34 | 9 | 8 | 17 | 44 | 67 | −23 | 4 | 30 | 1974–75 French Division 3 |
| 18 | CS Vittel (R) | 34 | 8 | 8 | 18 | 27 | 49 | −22 | 2 | 26 | 1974–75 French Division 3 |

Source: Histoire du PSG
Rules for classification: 1) points; 2) goal difference; 3) number of goals scored.
(P) Promoted; (R) Relegated

== Championship play-offs ==
30 May 1974

| Red Star | 2–0 | Lille |
|---|---|---|
| Victor Hugo Jarra 5' (pen.); Ducuing 89' |

Stade de Paris, Saint-Ouen
Attendance: 4,084
Referee: Michel Kitabdjian

5 June 1974

| Lille | 5–1 (a.e.t.) | Red Star |
|---|---|---|
| Desmenez 7, 75'; Gauthier 35'; Coste 108'; Verhoeve 115' | | ? 90' |

Stade Henri-Jooris, Lille
Attendance: 7,608
Referee: Roger Machin

== Promotion play-offs ==
31 May 1974

| Valenciennes | 2–1 | Paris Saint-Germain |
|---|---|---|
| Jeskowiak 61'; Wilczek 75' (pen.) | | M'Pelé 22' |

Stade Nungesser, Valenciennes
Attendance: 11,000
Referee: Robert Héliès

4 June 1974

| Paris Saint-Germain | 4–2 | Valenciennes |
|---|---|---|
| M'Pelé 35'; Dogliani 54, 75'; Marella 61' | | Neubert 39'; Wilczek 48' |

Parc des Princes, Paris
Attendance: 19,511
Referee: Robert Wurtz
