= Jean-Pierre Dogliani =

French footballer (1942-2003)

Personal information
- Full name: Pierre Dogliani
- Date of birth: 17 October 1942
- Place of birth: Marseille, France
- Date of death: 17 April 2003 (aged 60)
- Position: Midfielder

Youth career
- 1953–1961: Marseille

Senior career*
Years	Team	Apps	(Gls)
1961–1964	Marseille	62	(17)
1964–1971	Angers		
1971–1972	Bastia		
1972–1973	Monaco		
1973–1976	Paris Saint-Germain	57	(8)

International career
1967	France	1	(1)

Managerial career
- 1988: Strasbourg (caretaker)
- * Club domestic league appearances and goals

Pierre Dogliani (17 October 1942 – 17 April 2003), known as Jean-Pierre Dogliani, was a French footballer who played as a midfielder. He was caretaker manager for RC Strasbourg for two games in September and October 1988.

== Honours ==
Angers

- Division 2: 1968–69

Bastia

- Coupe de France runner-up: 1971–72

Orders

- Knight of the National Order of Merit: 2002
