= 2025 FIFA Intercontinental Cup final =

- The Ahmad bin Ali Stadium in Al Rayyan hosted the final.
- Event: 2025 FIFA Intercontinental Cup
Paris Saint-Germain	Flamengo
(France)	(Brazil)
1	1
- After extra time Paris Saint-Germain won 2–1 on penalties
- Date: 17 December 2025
- Venue: Ahmad bin Ali Stadium, Al Rayyan
- Man of the Match: Matvey Safonov (Paris Saint-Germain)
- Referee: Ismail Elfath (United States)
- Attendance: 42,150
- Weather: Clear; 20 °C (68 °F); 68% humidity

The 2025 FIFA Intercontinental Cup final, also known simply as the 2025 FIFA Intercontinental Cup, was the final match of the 2025 FIFA Intercontinental Cup, an international club football tournament featuring the club champions from each of the six continental confederations. The match took place on 17 December 2025 at the Ahmad bin Ali Stadium in Al Rayyan, Qatar, between French club Paris Saint-Germain, winners of the 2024–25 UEFA Champions League, and Brazilian club Flamengo, the winners of play-offs contested by the other five confederations.

Paris Saint-Germain won the match 2–1 on penalties, following a 1–1 draw after extra time, for their first club world championship title.

== Teams ==
Team	Confederation	Qualification for tournament	Previous annual club world championship finals (bold indicates winners)	Previous quadrennial club world championship finals (bold indicates winners)
(France) Paris Saint-Germain	UEFA	Winners of the 2024–25 UEFA Champions League	None	1 (2025)
(Brazil) Flamengo	CONMEBOL	Winners of the 2025 Copa Libertadores	IC: 1 (**1981**); FCWC: 1 (2019)	None

Note: On 27 October 2017, FIFA officially recognised all the champions of the Intercontinental Cup as club world champions, in equal status to the FIFA Club World Cup.

- IC: Intercontinental Cup (1960–2004)
- FCWC: FIFA Club World Cup finals (annual tournament; 2000, 2005–2023)

== Route to the final ==
As the winners of the 2024–25 UEFA Champions League, Paris Saint-Germain qualified directly for the final of the tournament. Flamengo advanced as the winners of the play-off match, known as the FIFA Challenger Cup, played on 13 December 2025.

(France) Paris Saint-Germain		Team	(Brazil) Flamengo	
Opponent	Result	2025 FIFA Intercontinental Cup	Opponent	Result
Bye		Second round	(Mexico) Cruz Azul	2–1
Bye		Play-off	(Egypt) Pyramids	2–0

== Match ==
=== Summary ===
In the 38th minute, Khvicha Kvaratskhelia scored when he finished at the back post from close range after a low cross from the right by Désiré Doué which Flamengo goalkeeper Agustín Rossi got a hand to but couldn't prevent it reaching Kvaratskhelia. In the 62nd minute, Flamengo were awarded a penalty when Giorgian de Arrascaeta was fouled by Marquinhos, Jorginho scored with a low finish to the right. The match went to extra-time and eventually a penalty shoot-out. PSG goalkeeper Matvey Safonov saved four penalties in a row as PSG won the match 2-1 on penalties.

=== Details ===
17 December 2025
20:00 AST

Paris Saint-Germain (France)	1–1 (a.e.t.)	(Brazil) Flamengo
Kvaratskhelia 38'	Report	Jorginho 62' (pen.)
Penalties
Vitinha (penalty scored); Dembélé (penalty missed); Mendes (penalty scored); Barcola (penalty missed)	2–1	(penalty scored) De la Cruz; (penalty missed) Saúl; (penalty missed) Pedro; (penalty missed) Pereira; (penalty missed) L. Araújo

Ahmad bin Ali Stadium, Al Rayyan
Attendance: 42,150
Referee: Ismail Elfath (United States)

**Paris Saint-Germain**	**Flamengo**

GK	39	(Russia) Matvey Safonov
RB	33	(France) Warren Zaïre-Emery
CB	5	(Brazil) Marquinhos (c)
CB	51	(Ecuador) Willian Pacho	(yellow card) 85'
LB	25	(Portugal) Nuno Mendes
CM	87	(Portugal) João Neves
CM	17	(Portugal) Vitinha	(yellow card) 44'
CM	8	(Spain) Fabián Ruiz	(yellow card) 32'	(substituted off) 106'
RF	14	(France) Désiré Doué		(substituted off) 78'
CF	19	(South Korea) Lee Kang-in		(substituted off) 35'
LF	7	(Georgia (country)) Khvicha Kvaratskhelia		(substituted off) 91'
Substitutes:
GK	30	(France) Lucas Chevalier
GK	89	(Italy) Renato Marin
DF	4	(Brazil) Lucas Beraldo
DF	6	(Ukraine) Illia Zabarnyi
DF	21	(France) Lucas Hernandez
MF	24	(France) Senny Mayulu		(substituted on) 35' (substituted off) 64'
FW	9	(Portugal) Gonçalo Ramos
FW	10	(France) Ousmane Dembélé		(substituted on) 78'
FW	29	(France) Bradley Barcola		(substituted on) 64'
FW	47	(France) Quentin Ndjantou		(substituted on) 106'
FW	49	(Senegal) Ibrahim Mbaye		(substituted on) 91'
Manager:
(Spain) Luis Enrique

GK	1	(Argentina) Agustín Rossi
RB	2	(Uruguay) Guillermo Varela
CB	3	(Brazil) Léo Ortiz
CB	4	(Brazil) Léo Pereira
LB	26	(Brazil) Alex Sandro	(yellow card) 23'
CM	5	(Chile) Erick Pulgar	(yellow card) 64'	(substituted off) 74'
CM	21	(Italy) Jorginho	(yellow card) 20'	(substituted off) 74'
RW	50	(Ecuador) Gonzalo Plata	(yellow card) 90+5'	(substituted off) 108'
AM	10	(Uruguay) Giorgian de Arrascaeta		(substituted off) 74'
LW	15	(Colombia) Jorge Carrascal		(substituted off) 56'
CF	27	(Brazil) Bruno Henrique (c)		(substituted off) 90+2'
Substitutes:
GK	49	(Brazil) Dyogo Alves
DF	6	(Brazil) Ayrton Lucas
DF	13	(Brazil) Danilo
DF	22	(Brazil) Emerson Royal
MF	8	(Spain) Saúl	(yellow card) 96'	(substituted on) 74'
MF	18	(Uruguay) Nicolás de la Cruz		(substituted on) 74'
MF	52	(Brazil) Evertton Araújo
MF	64	(Brazil) Wallace Yan
FW	7	(Brazil) Luiz Araújo		(substituted on) 90+2'
FW	9	(Brazil) Pedro		(substituted on) 56'
FW	11	(Brazil) Everton		(substituted on) 74'
FW	16	(Brazil) Samuel Lino		(substituted on) 108'
FW	23	(Brazil) Juninho	(yellow card) 120'
FW	30	(Brazil) Michael
Manager:
(Brazil) Filipe Luís

Man of the Match:
Matvey Safonov (Paris Saint-Germain)

Assistant referees:
Corey Parker (United States)
Kyle Atkins (United States)
Fourth official:
Amin Mohamed Omar (Egypt)
Reserve assistant referee:
Mahmoud Abouelregal (Egypt)
Video assistant referee:
Allen Chapman (United States)
Assistant video assistant referee:
Jarred Gillett (England)
Support video assistant referee:
Antonio García (Uruguay)

**Match rules**

- 90 minutes
- 30 minutes of extra time if necessary
- Penalty shoot-out if scores still level
- Maximum of fifteen named substitutes
- Maximum of five substitutions, with a sixth allowed in extra time
- Maximum of three substitution opportunities, with a fourth allowed in extra time
- Maximum of one concussion substitution, granting the opposition an additional standalone substitution

=== Statistics ===
Overall
Statistic	Paris Saint-Germain	Flamengo
Goals scored	1	1
Total shots	23	12
Shots on target	9	2
Ball possession	61%	39%
Corner kicks	10	3
Fouls committed	15	16
Offsides	2	2
Yellow cards	3	6
Red cards	0	0
