= Matvey Safonov =

Russian footballer (born 1999)

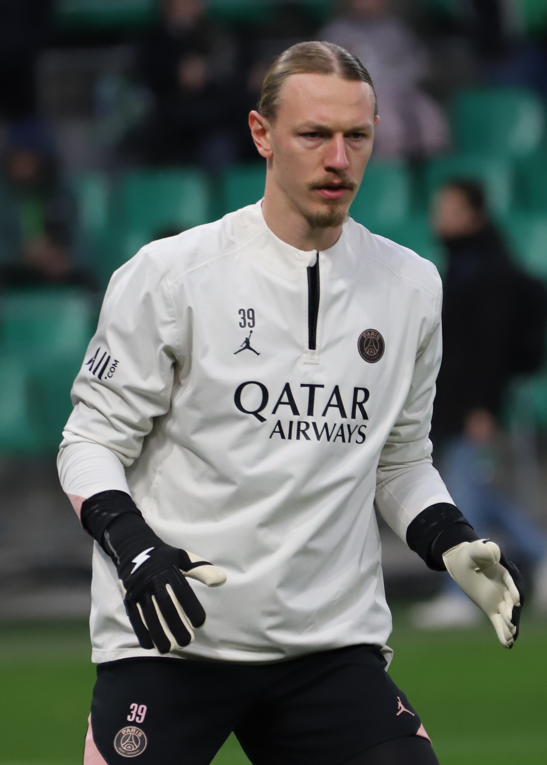
- Safonov with Paris Saint-Germain in 2025

Personal information
- Full name: Matvey Yevgenyevich Safonov
- Date of birth: 25 February 1999 (age 27)
- Place of birth: Stavropol, Russia
- Height: 1.92 m (6 ft 4 in)
- Position: Goalkeeper

Team information
- Current team: Paris Saint-Germain
- Number: 39

Youth career
- 2015–2017: Krasnodar

Senior career*
Years	Team	Apps	(Gls)
2017–2024	Krasnodar	147	(0)
2018–2021	→ Krasnodar-2	18	(0)
2024–	Paris Saint-Germain	36	(0)

International career^{‡}
2014	Russia U15	1	(0)
2014–2015	Russia U16	8	(0)
2015–2016	Russia U17	9	(0)
2016–2017	Russia U18	6	(0)
2017	Russia U19	3	(0)
2018–2020	Russia U21	10	(0)
2021–	Russia	20	(0)
- * Club domestic league appearances and goals as of 21 November 2026 ‡ National team caps and goals as of 17 November 2026

Matvey Yevgenyevich Safonov (also spelled Matvei Safonov; Russian: Матвей Евгеньевич Сафонов; born 25 February 1999) is a Russian professional footballer who plays as a goalkeeper for Ligue 1 club Paris Saint-Germain and the Russia national team. Described by media sources as a penalty specialist, Safonov is often regarded amongst the best goalkeepers in the world.

Coming through the team's youth system, Safonov began his career with FC Krasnodar in 2017. After seven years with Krasnodar, Safonov moved to Ligue 1 side Paris Saint-Germain in June 2024 for a transfer fee of €20 million, where he won the UEFA Champions League as part of a treble in 2025. After winning the starting spot in the following season, Safonov won another Champions League as part of a double in 2026. He was subsequently nominated for the 2026 Yashin Trophy.

Internationally, Safonov made his debut for Russia in 2021, and was subsequently included in the Russian squad for UEFA Euro 2020.

== Personal life ==
Safonov was born in Stavropol. His father, Yevgeny Safonov, was a basketball player and later worked as a youth coach at Lokomotiv Kuban, while his mother, Lidiya, was not involved in professional sport. His family lived in several cities, including Maykop and Volgograd, before settling in Krasnodar by the time Safonov attended kindergarten and school.

As a child, Safonov initially practised swimming, taekwondo, and basketball, also showing aptitude in mathematics and chess. Aged 12, he participated in the Mathematical Kangaroo competition, placing second in his school. He joined a football section while at school and was placed in goal during his first trial. In the seventh grade, he entered the FC Krasnodar academy and moved into its boarding school system. In 2017, he enrolled at Kuban State University, where he studied pedagogy, psychology and communication, graduating with a bachelor's degree in 2021.

From 2020 to 2021, he was married to Anastasia Kazachek, with whom he had been in a relationship since 2014. In June 2021, the couple had a daughter, Maya. Following the child's birth, the couple separated. In 2024, the court ordered Safonov to pay alimony equal to a quarter of his income and repay his debt.

Since the beginning of 2022, he has been in a relationship with stand-up comedian Marina Kondratyuk. They got married in March 2025.

== Club career ==
=== Krasnodar ===
==== 2017–2021 ====
Safonov made his debut in the Russian Premier League for Krasnodar on 13 August 2017 in a game against Amkar Perm. He became a regular member of Krasnodar's first team during the second half of the 2018–19 season, when the club finished third in the league. At the end of 2019, Safonov and his teammate Magomed-Shapi Suleymanov shared the national award "First Five", given to the best young player in the Russian Premier League.

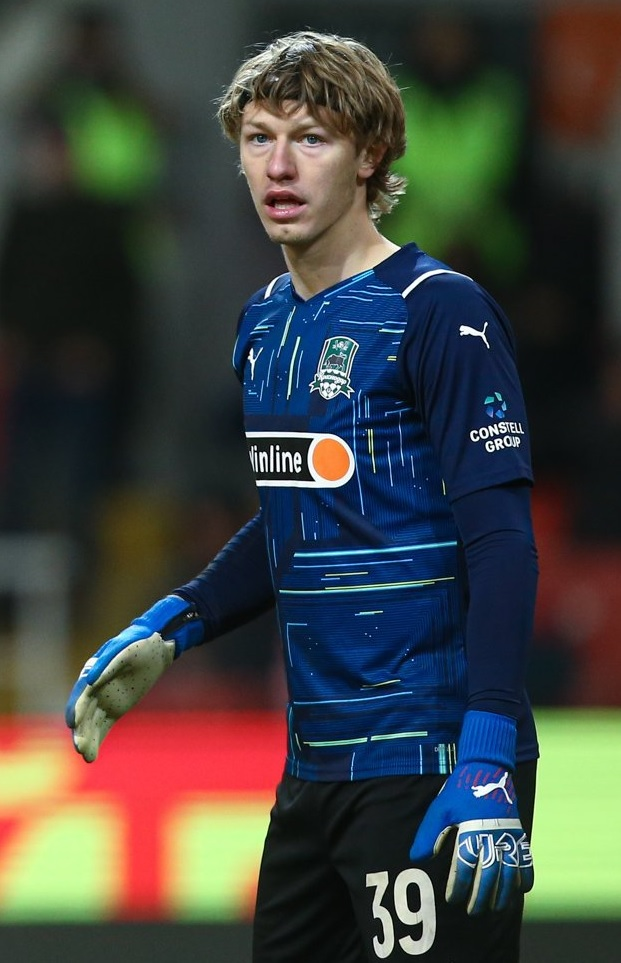
Safonov with Krasnodar in 2022

In the 2020–21 UEFA Champions League play-off round, Safonov helped Krasnodar reach the competition's group stage for the first time. In the first leg against PAOK on 22 September 2020, he saved an early penalty from Dimitrios Pelkas as Krasnodar won 2–1. Krasnodar won the return leg by the same score on 30 September, securing a group stage promotion. On 20 October 2020, he was named the man of the match in Krasnodar's 1–1 draw with Rennes. By 2021, Safonov was also wearing the captain's armband for Krasnodar. After the 2020–21 season, he won the Lev Yashin Goalkeeper of the Year award in Russia for the first time.

Krasnodar finished third in their Champions League group, qualifying for the 2020–21 UEFA Europa League play-off round. Despite this European run, the 2020–21 season proved difficult domestically, as Krasnodar dropped to tenth place in the league with Safonov conceding 33 goals in 21 matches.

==== 2021–2024 ====
The 2021–22 season was marked by the departure of many foreign players from the club following Russia's invasion of Ukraine. Despite the upheaval, Safonov remained as captain and recorded eight clean sheets in 27 league matches, conceding just 27 goals. Krasnodar finished fourth that season. The 2022–23 season was mixed for Safonov. He led the league in total saves and save percentage for much of the campaign, but his form dipped before the winter break, when he conceded eight goals in two matches against Orenburg and Fakel. In the last league match of the season against Akhmat Grozny, he committed a costly error on a set piece that allowed the opponents to equalize, after which he lost his starting spot in the Russian Cup final against CSKA Moscow to Stanislav Agkatsev.

On 18 January 2024, Safonov extended his contract with Krasnodar to 31 January 2029. In his final 2023–24 season with Krasnodar, Safonov played all 30 league matches as the club finished second in the league. He was later named the winner of the Lev Yashin Goalkeeper of the Year award at the end of that season, his second win in the competition. He also led the league in goals prevented, with a rating of 5.8. In his final match for the club on 25 May 2024, he kept a clean sheet in a 1-0 win over Dynamo Moscow, securing Krasnodar's first-ever silver medals in the Russian championship. In total, Safonov made 175 official appearances for Krasnodar's first team, recording 53 clean sheets.

=== Paris Saint-Germain ===
==== 2024–25 season: Backup goalkeeper ====
On 14 June 2024, Safonov joined reigning Ligue 1 champions Paris Saint-Germain (PSG), signing a contract until 2029. Media reports quoted a transfer fee of €20 million. On 18 September 2024, he made his debut for PSG in a 1–0 Champions League win over Girona. On 22 December 2024, Safonov played in the Coupe de France round of 64 against Lens; after a 1–1 draw, he saved two penalties in the shoot-out as PSG advanced. On 24 May 2025, he started in the 2025 Coupe de France final, keeping a clean sheet as PSG defeated Reims 3–0. Following his team's 5–0 victory over Inter Milan in the 2025 UEFA Champions League final on 1 June, he became the fifth Russian Champions League winner since Denis Cheryshev, Igor Dobrovolski, Vladimir But and Dmitri Alenichev—the first since 2016.

==== 2025–26 season: Earning the starting spot ====
On 12 August 2025, PSG's starting goalkeeper Gianluigi Donnarumma left the club to join Manchester City for a fee of €30 million. Having provoked this departure, PSG signed Lucas Chevalier from Lille for €40 million on 9 August 2025 to be their new first-choice goalkeeper. However, Chevalier struggled to adapt, receiving criticism for errors, including against Marseille and Lyon. On 31 August 2025, PSG's new Ukrainian signing Illia Zabarnyi stated in an interview with Football 360 that "I do not maintain any personal relations with any Russians. I have to interact with [Safonov] on a professional level during training and fulfil my obligations to the club." On 2 September, when asked to respond to Zabarnyi's comments in an interview with Sport Express, Safonov declined. On 29 November 2025, Chevalier suffered an ankle injury against Monaco, allowing Safonov to temporarily take the starting position. On 17 December 2025, in the Intercontinental Cup final against Flamengo, Safonov saved four of five penalties in the penalty shoot-out. Consequently, Paris Saint-Germain won their first global title and sixth trophy of the 2025 calendar year. Manager Luis Enrique later revealed that Safonov had fractured his hand on the third penalty kick, and saved the last two shots despite the injury.

In January 2026, Chevalier conceded two goals in a 1–2 defeat to Sporting CP in the Champions League. Enrique then opted to test Safonov immediately after his return as the starter against Newcastle United in the final matchday of the Champions League league phase. From that point on, Safonov retained the starting position, playing in Le Classique against Marseille, the Champions League play-off round against Monaco, and other Ligue 1 matches. On 17 March 2026, Safonov delivered an exceptional performance in the Champions League round of 16 second leg against Chelsea at Stamford Bridge, making nine saves in a 3–0 victory (8–2 on aggregate). In the Champions League quarter-final second leg against Liverpool, he kept a clean sheet with six saves, helping PSG reach the semi-finals. After the match, Safonov said: "it was a decent performance. There were a few mistakes, but I'm happy. I can do better. I have to be ready for the team whenever they need me." On 6 May 2026, in the Champions League semi-final second leg against Bayern Munich, Safonov made five decisive saves as PSG drew 1–1 to progress 6–5 on aggregate, reaching their second consecutive final. On 30 May 2026, in the 2026 UEFA Champions League final against Arsenal, Safonov became the first Russian goalkeeper and the second Russian ever, after Dmitri Alenichev in the 2004 final, to play a UEFA Champions League final. The match ended in a penalty shoot-out, after which PSG won its second consecutive Champions League on penalty shoot-out. Hence, Safonov became the first Russian footballer to win the Champions League twice.

== International career ==
On 9 October 2020, Safonov was called up to Russia national team for the first time for UEFA Nations League games against Turkey and Hungary. On 11 May 2021, he was included in the preliminary extended 30-man squad for UEFA Euro 2020. He debuted on 1 June in a friendly match against Poland, and next day, he was included in the final squad for the Euros. On 16 June, he played in Russia's second group game against Finland, keeping a clean sheet in a 1–0 victory. He played again on 21 June in the last group game: a 1–4 defeat to Denmark.

== Style of play ==
In February 2026, Safonov's manager at Paris Saint-Germain, Luis Enrique, stated: "He can play with his feet, which we like. He's courageous and physically very strong. The way we defend, I think, we leave a lot of space for our opponents, and that creates a real danger. But I think he's perfectly suited to our approach." Safonov has also been acclaimed for his proficiency in saving penalties. In the 2025–26 season, Safonov became recognised for deliberately kicking the ball out of play from a goal kick so that PSG could instigate their pressing system.

== Career statistics ==
=== Club ===
As of match played 21 November 2026

Appearances and goals by club, season and competition
Club	Season	League			National cup (Note: Includes Russian Cup, Coupe de France)		Europe		Other		Total	
Club	Season	Division	Apps	Goals	Apps	Goals	Apps	Goals	Apps	Goals	Apps	Goals
Krasnodar-2	2017–18	Russian Second League	1	0	—		—		—		4	0
Krasnodar-2	2018–19	Russian First League	16	0	—		—		—		19	0
Krasnodar-2	2020–21	Russian First League	1	0	—		—		—		1	0
Krasnodar-2	Total		18	0	—		—		—		18	0
Krasnodar	2017–18	Russian Premier League	1	0	0	0	0	0	—		1	0
Krasnodar	2018–19	Russian Premier League	14	0	2	0	5 (Note: Appearances in UEFA Europa League)	0	—		21	0
Krasnodar	2019–20	Russian Premier League	27	0	0	0	6 (Note: Three appearances in UEFA Champions League, three appearances in UEFA Europa League)	0	—		33	0
Krasnodar	2020–21	Russian Premier League	21	0	0	0	6 (Note: Appearances in UEFA Champions League)	0	—		27	0
Krasnodar	2021–22	Russian Premier League	27	0	0	0	—		—		27	0
Krasnodar	2022–23	Russian Premier League	27	0	9	0	—		—		36	0
Krasnodar	2023–24	Russian Premier League	30	0	0	0	—		—		30	0
Krasnodar	Total		147	0	11	0	17	0	—		175	0
Paris Saint-Germain	2024–25	Ligue 1	10	0	5	0	2	0	0	0	17	0
Paris Saint-Germain	2025–26	Ligue 1	15	0	0	0	11	0	1 (Note: Appearance in FIFA Intercontinental Cup)	0	27	0
Paris Saint-Germain	2026–27	Ligue 1	11	0	0	0	4	0	2 (Note: One appearance in UEFA Super Cup, one appearance in Trophée des Champions)	0	17	0
Paris Saint-Germain	Total		36	0	5	0	17	0	3	0	61	0
Career total			201	0	16	0	34	0	3	0	254	0

=== International ===
As of match played 17 November 2026

Appearances and goals by national team and year
National team	Year	Apps	Goals
Russia	2021	8	0
Russia	2023	3	0
Russia	2024	2	0
Russia	2025	4	0
Russia	2026	3	0
Total		20	0

== Honours ==
Paris Saint-Germain

- Ligue 1: 2024–25, 2025–26
- Coupe de France: 2024–25
- Trophée des Champions: 2024
- UEFA Champions League: 2024–25, 2025–26
- UEFA Super Cup: 2025, 2026
- FIFA Intercontinental Cup: 2025
- FIFA Club World Cup runner-up: 2025

Individual

- First Five award: 2019
- Lev Yashin Goalkeeper of the Year: 2021–22, 2023–24
- Russian Premier League Goalkeeper of the Season: 2023–24
- FIFA Intercontinental Cup Final Man of the match: 2025
