= Martin James (French footballer) =

French footballer (born 2008)

Personal information
- Date of birth: 14 February 2008 (age 18)
- Place of birth: Versailles, France
- Height: 1.86 m (6 ft 1 in)
- Position: Goalkeeper

Team information
- Current team: 1. FC Köln
- Number: 21

Youth career
- 2015–2016: AO Buc Football
- 2016–2020: Versailles
- 2020–2022: AS Meudon
- 2022–2026: Paris Saint-Germain

Senior career*
| Years | Team | Apps | (Gls) |
| 2025–2026 | Paris Saint-Germain | 0 | (0) |
| 2026– | 1. FC Köln | 0 | (0) |
| 2026– | → 1. FC Köln II (res.) | 0 | (0) |

International career^{‡}
| 2026– | France U18 | 1 | (0) |
- * Club domestic league appearances and goals as of 28 July 2026 ‡ National team caps and goals as of 28 March 2026

Martin James (born 14 February 2008) is a French footballer who plays as a goalkeeper for Bundesliga club 1. FC Köln.

== Early life ==
James was born on 14 February 2008 and is a native of Versailles. He comes from a family of footballers hailing from the Cotentin Peninsula.

== Club career ==
As a youth player, James joined the youth academy of AO Buc Football. During the summer of 2016, he joined the youth academy of Versailles. Following his stint there, he joined the youth academy of AS Meudon in 2020.

In April 2021, it was announced that James would join the youth academy of Paris Saint-Germain in July 2023. On 26 November 2025, he featured on the bench for a UEFA Champions League match against Tottenham Hotspur due to an injury to the back-up goalkeeper Renato Marin. A few hours prior, James had played the full game against Tottenham in the UEFA Youth League.

On 24 July 2026, James signed with 1. FC Köln in Germany until June 2029.

== Style of play ==
James plays as a goalkeeper. He has been described as being tall and imposing in goal and having good footwork.

== Honours ==
Paris Saint-Germain U19

- Championnat National U19: 2024–25, 2025–26

Paris Saint-Germain U18

- Coupe Gambardella: 2025–26

Paris Saint-Germain

- Trophée des Champions: 2025
