= 2025–26 Paris Saint-Germain FC season =

56th season in existence of Paris Saint-Germain

Paris Saint-Germain
2025–26 season
- President: Nasser Al-Khelaifi
- Head coach: Luis Enrique
- Stadium: Parc des Princes
- Ligue 1: 1st
- Coupe de France: Round of 32
- Trophée des Champions: Winners
- UEFA Champions League: Winners
- UEFA Super Cup: Winners
- FIFA Intercontinental Cup: Winners
- Top goalscorer: League: Bradley Barcola (11); All: Ousmane Dembélé (20)
- Highest home attendance: 47,926 vs Marseille, Ligue 1, 8 February 2026 vs Lyon, Ligue 1, 19 April 2026 vs Lorient, Ligue 1, 2 May 2026
- Lowest home attendance: 45,747 vs Bayern Munich, Champions League, 4 November 2025
- Average home league attendance: 47,577
- Biggest win: 7–2 vs Bayer Leverkusen, Champions League, 21 October 2025; 5–0 vs Rennes, Ligue 1, 6 December 2025; 5–0 vs Marseille, Ligue 1, 8 February 2026
- Biggest defeat: 1–3 vs Rennes, Ligue 1, 13 February 2026; 1–3 vs Monaco, Ligue 1, 6 March 2026
Home colours	Away colours	Third colours

The 2025–26 season was the 56th season in the history of Paris Saint-Germain, and the club's 52nd consecutive season in the French top flight. The club participated in Ligue 1, the Coupe de France, the Trophée des Champions, the UEFA Champions League, the UEFA Super Cup and the FIFA Intercontinental Cup.

PSG became world champions for the first time when they won the FIFA Intercontinental Cup, defeating Flamengo of Brazil on penalties in the final on 17 December 2025. They also accomplished the rare sextuple, as this was their sixth trophy won in the same calendar year.

PSG won a second consecutive Champions League title after defeating Arsenal on penalties in the final on 30 May 2026.

== Kits ==
Home	Away	Third	Fourth	Fifth

== Squad information ==
Players and squad numbers last updated on 2 February 2026.
Note: Flags indicate national team as has been defined under FIFA eligibility rules. Players may hold more than one non-FIFA nationality.

No.	Player	Nat.	Position(s)	Date of birth (age)	Contract ends	Transfer fee	Signed from
Goalkeepers
30	Lucas Chevalier	(France)	GK	6 November 2001 (aged 24)	2030	€40M	(France) Lille
39	Matvey Safonov	(Russia)	GK	25 February 1999 (aged 27)	2029	€20M	(Russia) Krasnodar
89	Renato Marin	(Italy)	GK	10 July 2006 (aged 19)	2030	Free transfer	(Italy) Roma
Defenders
2	Achraf Hakimi (VC)	(Morocco)	RB	4 November 1998 (aged 27)	2029	€68M	(Italy) Inter Milan
4	Lucas Beraldo	(Brazil)	CB	24 November 2003 (aged 22)	2028	€20M	(Brazil) São Paulo
5	Marquinhos (C)	(Brazil)	CB	14 May 1994 (aged 32)	2028	€31.4M	(Italy) Roma
6	Illia Zabarnyi	(Ukraine)	CB	1 September 2002 (aged 23)	2030	€63M	(England) Bournemouth
21	Lucas Hernandez	(France)	LB	14 February 1996 (aged 30)	2028	€45M	(Germany) Bayern Munich
25	Nuno Mendes	(Portugal)	LB	19 June 2002 (aged 24)	2029	€38M	(Portugal) Sporting CP
51	Willian Pacho	(Ecuador)	CB	16 October 2001 (aged 24)	2029	€40M	(Germany) Eintracht Frankfurt
Midfielders
8	Fabián Ruiz	(Spain)	CM	4 April 1996 (aged 30)	2027	€22.5M	(Italy) Napoli
17	Vitinha	(Portugal)	DM	13 February 2000 (aged 26)	2029	€41.5M	(Portugal) Porto
19	Lee Kang-in	(South Korea)	AM	19 February 2001 (aged 25)	2028	€22M	(Spain) Mallorca
24	Senny Mayulu	(France)	CM	17 May 2006 (aged 20)	2027	N/A	(France) Youth Sector
27	Dro Fernández	(Spain)	AM	12 January 2008 (aged 18)	2030	€8.2M	(Spain) Barcelona
33	Warren Zaïre-Emery	(France)	CM	8 March 2006 (aged 20)	2029	N/A	(France) Youth Sector
87	João Neves	(Portugal)	CM	27 September 2004 (aged 21)	2029	€65.92M	(Portugal) Benfica
Forwards
7	Khvicha Kvaratskhelia	(Georgia (country))	LW	12 February 2001 (aged 25)	2029	€70M	(Italy) Napoli
9	Gonçalo Ramos	(Portugal)	CF	20 June 2001 (aged 25)	2028	€65M	(Portugal) Benfica
10	Ousmane Dembélé	(France)	CF	15 May 1997 (aged 29)	2028	€50M	(Spain) Barcelona
14	Désiré Doué	(France)	RW	3 June 2005 (aged 21)	2029	€50M	(France) Rennes
29	Bradley Barcola	(France)	LW	2 September 2002 (aged 23)	2028	€45M	(France) Lyon
47	Quentin Ndjantou	(France)	LW	23 July 2007 (aged 18)	2028	N/A	(France) Youth Sector
49	Ibrahim Mbaye	(Senegal)	RW	24 January 2008 (aged 18)	2027	N/A	(France) Youth Sector

== Transfers ==
=== In ===
No.	Pos.	Player	Transferred from	Fee	Date	Source
89	GK	(Italy) Renato Marin	Unattached	Free	17 July 2025	
30	GK	(France) Lucas Chevalier	(France) Lille	€40 million (Note: Up to €15 million in bonuses)	9 August 2025	
6	DF	(Ukraine) Illia Zabarnyi	(England) Bournemouth	€63 million (Note: Up to €3 million in bonuses)	12 August 2025	
27	MF	(Spain) Dro Fernández	(Spain) Barcelona	€8.2 million	26 January 2026	

=== Out ===
Pos.	Player	Transferred to	Fee	Date	Source
DF	(France) Yoram Zague	(Denmark) Copenhagen	Loan (Note: Includes an option to sign permanently)	24 June 2025 (Note: Transfer officially completed during the 2024–25 season due to the 2025 FIFA Club World Cup)	
DF	(Morocco) Naoufel El Hannach	(France) Montpellier	Loan	26 June 2025	
DF	(France) Axel Tape	(Germany) Bayer Leverkusen	Free	1 July 2025	
GK	(Portugal) Louis Mouquet	Released (Note: On 14 August 2025, Mouquet signed for Padova.)	Free	1 July 2025	
DF	(France) Vimoj Muntu Wa Mungu	Released	Free	1 July 2025	
MF	(France) Ayman Kari	Released	Free	1 July 2025	
MF	(Brazil) Gabriel Moscardo	(Portugal) Braga	Loan	19 July 2025	
GK	(France) Lucas Lavallée	(France) Châteauroux	Undisclosed	25 July 2025	
DF	(Slovakia) Milan Škriniar	(Turkey) Fenerbahçe	€7 million	31 July 2025	
DF	(France) Nordi Mukiele	(England) Sunderland	€11 million	17 August 2025	
MF	(Portugal) Renato Sanches	(Greece) Panathinaikos	Loan	24 August 2025	
GK	(Spain) Arnau Tenas	(Spain) Villarreal	€2.5 million (Note: Up to €3.5 million in bonuses)	28 August 2025	
FW	(Spain) Marco Asensio	(Turkey) Fenerbahçe	€7.5 million (Note: Up to €500,000 in bonuses)	1 September 2025	
MF	(Spain) Carlos Soler	(Spain) Real Sociedad	€8 million	1 September 2025	
FW	(France) Randal Kolo Muani	(England) Tottenham Hotspur	Loan (Note: €5 million loan fee)	1 September 2025	
GK	(Italy) Gianluigi Donnarumma	(England) Manchester City	€30 million (Note: Up to €5 million in bonuses)	2 September 2025	
DF	(France) Presnel Kimpembe	Qatar SC	Undisclosed	7 September 2025	
DF	(France) Yoram Zague	(Belgium) Eupen	Loan	31 January 2026	
DF	(France) Noham Kamara	(France) Lyon	Loan (Note: Includes an option to sign permanently for €4 million, plus up to €2 million in bonuses)	2 February 2026	

== Competitions ==
=== Overall record ===
Competition	First match	Last match	Starting round	Final position	Record							
Competition	First match	Last match	Starting round	Final position	Pld	W	D	L	GF	GA	GD	Win %
Ligue 1	17 August 2025	17 May 2026	Matchday 1	Winners	34	24	4	6	74	29	+45	70.59
Coupe de France	20 December 2025	12 January 2026	Round of 64	Round of 32	2	1	0	1	4	1	+3	50.00
Trophée des Champions	8 January 2026		Final	Winners	1	0	1	0	2	2	+0	0.00
UEFA Champions League	17 September 2025	30 May 2026	League phase	Winners	17	10	5	2	45	23	+22	58.82
UEFA Super Cup	13 August 2025		Final	Winners	1	0	1	0	2	2	+0	0.00
FIFA Intercontinental Cup	17 December 2025		Final	Winners	1	0	1	0	1	1	+0	0.00
Total					56	35	12	9	128	58	+70	62.50

Source: Soccerway

=== Ligue 1 ===
==== League table ====
Pos	Team	Pld	W	D	L	GF	GA	GD	Pts	Qualification or relegation
1	Paris Saint-Germain (C)	34	24	4	6	74	29	+45	76	Qualification for the Champions League league phase
2	Lens	34	22	4	8	66	35	+31	70	Qualification for the Champions League league phase
3	Lille	34	18	7	9	52	37	+15	61	Qualification for the Champions League league phase
4	Lyon	34	18	6	10	53	40	+13	60	Qualification for the Champions League third qualifying round
5	Marseille	34	18	5	11	63	45	+18	59	Qualification for the Europa League league phase (Note: Since the 2025–26 Coupe de France winners, Lens, qualified for the Champions League via league position, the Europa League spot awarded to the cup winners was passed to the sixth-placed team, and the Conference League spot was passed to the seventh-placed team.)

Source: Ligue 1
Rules for classification: 1) Points; 2) Goal difference; 3) Head-to-head points; 4) Head-to-head goal difference; 5) Head-to-head goals scored; 6) Head-to-head away goals scored; 7) Goals scored; 8) Away goals scored; 9) Fair-play points (Note: Head-to-head record is used only after all the matches between the teams in question have been played).
(C) Champions

==== Results summary ====
Overall								Home						Away					
Pld	W	D	L	GF	GA	GD	Pts	W	D	L	GF	GA	GD	W	D	L	GF	GA	GD
34	24	4	6	74	29	+45	76	13	2	2	41	12	+29	11	2	4	33	17	+16

Source: Ligue 1

==== Results by round ====
Round	1	2	3	4	5	6	7	8	9	10	11	12	13	14	15	16	17	18	19	20	21	22	23	24	25	27	28	30	26^{1}	31	32	33	29^{2}	34
Ground	A	H	A	H	A	H	A	H	A	A	H	A	H	A	H	A	H	H	A	A	H	A	H	A	H	A	H	H	H	A	H	H	A	A
Result	W	W	W	W	L	W	D	D	W	D	W	W	W	L	W	W	W	W	W	W	W	L	W	W	L	W	W	L	W	W	D	W	W	L
Position	5	3	1	1	2	1	1	2	1	1	1	1	1	2	2	2	2	2	1	1	1	2	1	1	1	1	1	1	1	1	1	1	1	1

Source: Ligue 1
A = Away; H = Home; W = Win; D = Draw; L = Loss

^{1} Matchday 26 (vs Nantes) was postponed due to Paris Saint-Germain's involvement in the UEFA Champions League.
^{2} Matchday 29 (vs Lens) was postponed due to Paris Saint-Germain's involvement in the UEFA Champions League.

==== Matches ====
The league fixtures was announced on 27 June 2025.

17 August 2025 1	Nantes	0–1	Paris Saint-Germain	Nantes
20:45 CEST (UTC+2)	Amian (yellow card) 45+1'	Report	Vitinha 67'; Hakimi (yellow card) 80'	Stadium: Stade de la Beaujoire; Attendance: 34,053; Referee: Benoît Bastien

22 August 2025 2	Paris Saint-Germain	1–0	Angers	Paris
20:45 CEST (UTC+2)	Dembélé (penalty missed) 27'; Fabián 50'	Report		Stadium: Parc des Princes; Attendance: 47,401; Referee: Hakim Ben El Hadj

30 August 2025 3	Toulouse	3–6	Paris Saint-Germain	Toulouse
21:05 CEST (UTC+2)	Cresswell 37'; Cásseres (penalty missed) 45+9'; Dønnum (yellow card) 82'; Gboho 89'; Vossah 90+1'	Report	Neves 7', 14', 78'; Barcola 9'; Dembélé 31' (pen.), 51' (pen.)	Stadium: Stadium de Toulouse; Attendance: 31,515; Referee: Éric Wattellier

14 September 2025 4	Paris Saint-Germain	2–0	Lens	Paris
17:15 CEST (UTC+2)	Barcola 15', 51'; Ramos (yellow card) 39'	Report	Édouard (yellow card) 5'; Thauvin (yellow card) 18'	Stadium: Parc des Princes; Attendance: 47,642; Referee: Jérémie Pignard

22 September 2025 5	Marseille	1–0	Paris Saint-Germain	Marseille
20:00 CEST (UTC+2)	Marquinhos 5' (o.g.); Pavard (yellow card) 18'; Weah (yellow card) 50'; Murillo (yellow card) 90+5'	Report		Stadium: Stade Vélodrome; Attendance: 66,190; Referee: Jérôme Brisard
Note: The match was originally scheduled for 21 September 2025 at 20:45, but was postponed due to heavy storms.

27 September 2025 6	Paris Saint-Germain	2–0	Auxerre	Paris
21:05 CEST (UTC+2)	Zabarnyi 32'; Beraldo 54'; Barcola (yellow card) 88'	Report	Senaya (yellow card) 24'; Matondo (yellow card) 77'	Stadium: Parc des Princes; Attendance: 47,792; Referee: Thomas Léonard

5 October 2025 7	Lille	1–1	Paris Saint-Germain	Villeneuve-d'Ascq
20:45 CEST (UTC+2)	Mbappé 85'; André (yellow card) 88'	Report	Hernandez (yellow card) 45+1'; Mendes 66'	Stadium: Stade Pierre-Mauroy; Attendance: 47,355; Referee: Benoît Bastien

17 October 2025 8	Paris Saint-Germain	3–3	Strasbourg	Paris
20:45 CEST (UTC+2)	Barcola 6'; Ramos 58' (pen.); Hernandez (yellow card) 60'; Lee (yellow card) 74'; Mayulu 79'	Report	Panichelli 26', 49'; Moreira 41'; Penders (yellow card) 56'	Stadium: Parc des Princes; Attendance: 47,754; Referee: Clément Turpin

25 October 2025 9	Brest	0–3	Paris Saint-Germain	Brest
17:00 CEST (UTC+2)	Mboup (yellow card) 24'; Del Castillo (penalty missed) 59'	Report	Hakimi (yellow card) 8', (goal) 29', 39'; Doué 90+6'	Stadium: Stade Francis-Le Blé; Attendance: 14,978; Referee: Jérémie Pignard

29 October 2025 10	Lorient	1–1	Paris Saint-Germain	Lorient
19:00 CET (UTC+1)	Igor Silva 51'	Report	Mendes 49'; Zabarnyi (yellow card) 68'; Barcola (yellow card) 90+5'	Stadium: Stade du Moustoir; Attendance: 16,706; Referee: Willy Delajod

1 November 2025 11	Paris Saint-Germain	1–0	Nice	Paris
17:00 CET (UTC+1)	Zabarnyi (yellow card) 68'; Kvaratskhelia (yellow card) 78'; Lee (yellow card) 87'; Ramos 90+4'	Report	Bah (yellow card) 27'	Stadium: Parc des Princes; Attendance: 47,629; Referee: François Letexier

9 November 2025 12	Lyon	2–3	Paris Saint-Germain	Décines-Charpieu
20:45 CET (UTC+1)	Moreira 30'; Mata (yellow card) 44'; Maitland-Niles 50'; Morton (yellow card) 57'; Tagliafico (yellow card) 57' (yellow-red card) 90+3'; Tolisso (yellow card) 90+3'; Satriano (yellow card) 90+6'	Report	Zaïre-Emery 26'; Kvaratskhelia 33'; Mayulu (yellow card) 45+1'; Neves 90+5'; Ramos (yellow card) 90+6'	Stadium: Parc Olympique Lyonnais; Attendance: 58,257; Referee: Benoît Bastien

22 November 2025 13	Paris Saint-Germain	3–0	Le Havre	Paris
21:05 CET (UTC+1)	Lee 29'; Mendes (yellow card) 61'; Neves 65'; Ndjantou (yellow card) 69'; Barcola 87'	Report	Touré (yellow card) 32'	Stadium: Parc des Princes; Attendance: 47,694; Referee: Mathieu Vernice

29 November 2025 14	Monaco	1–0	Paris Saint-Germain	Monaco
17:00 CET (UTC+1)	Camara (yellow card) 12'; Minamino 68'; Kehrer (red card) 80'; Diatta (yellow card) 88'; Teze (yellow card) 90+5'	Report	Vitinha (yellow card) 33'	Stadium: Stade Louis II; Attendance: 11,546; Referee: Clément Turpin

6 December 2025 15	Paris Saint-Germain	5–0	Rennes	Paris
21:05 CET (UTC+1)	Kvaratskhelia 28', 67'; Mayulu 39'; Mbaye 88'; Ramos 90+1'	Report	Jacquet (yellow card) 53' (yellow-red card) 74'; Aït Boudlal (yellow card) 69'	Stadium: Parc des Princes; Attendance: 47,823; Referee: Marc Bollengier

13 December 2025 16	Metz	2–3	Paris Saint-Germain	Metz
19:00 CET (UTC+1)	Mbaye (yellow card) 16'; Deminguet 42'; Tsitaishvili 81'; Kouao (yellow card) 90+3'	Report	Ramos 31'; Ndjantou 39'; Doué 63'; Zaïre-Emery (yellow card) 75'	Stadium: Stade Saint-Symphorien; Attendance: 28,500; Referee: Romain Lissorgue

4 January 2026 17	Paris Saint-Germain	2–1	Paris FC	Paris
20:45 CET (UTC+1)	Doué 45'; Zabarnyi (yellow card) 49'; Dembélé 53'	Report	Geubbels 51' (pen.)	Stadium: Parc des Princes; Attendance: 47,892; Referee: Benoît Bastien

16 January 2026 18	Paris Saint-Germain	3–0	Lille	Paris
21:00 CET (UTC+1)	Dembélé 13', 64'; Barcola 90+3'	Report	Haraldsson (yellow card) 62'	Stadium: Parc des Princes; Attendance: 46,909; Referee: Jérôme Brisard

23 January 2026 19	Auxerre	0–1	Paris Saint-Germain	Auxerre
20:00 CET (UTC+1)		Report	Beraldo (yellow card) 72'; Barcola 79'	Stadium: Stade de l'Abbé-Deschamps; Attendance: 17,254; Referee: Mathieu Vernice

1 February 2026 20	Strasbourg	1–2	Paris Saint-Germain	Strasbourg
20:45 CET (UTC+1)	Panichelli (penalty missed) 20'; Doué 27'; Moreira (yellow card) 90+6'	Report	Mayulu 22'; Hakimi (red card) 75'; Mendes 81'	Stadium: Stade de la Meinau; Attendance: 31,324; Referee: Éric Wattellier

8 February 2026 21	Paris Saint-Germain	5–0	Marseille	Paris
20:45 CET (UTC+1)	Vitinha (yellow card) 9'; Dembélé 12', 37'; Zaïre-Emery (yellow card) 59'; Medina 64' (o.g.); Kvaratskhelia 66'; Lee 74'	Report	Emerson (yellow card) 82'; Balerdi (yellow card) 90+2'	Stadium: Parc des Princes; Attendance: 47,926; Referee: Willy Delajod

13 February 2026 22	Rennes	3–1	Paris Saint-Germain	Rennes
19:00 CET (UTC+1)	Al-Taamari 34'; Lepaul 69'; Embolo 81'	Report	Dembélé 71'	Stadium: Roazhon Park; Attendance: 28,545; Referee: Benoît Bastien

21 February 2026 23	Paris Saint-Germain	3–0	Metz	Paris
21:05 CET (UTC+1)	Doué 3'; Barcola 45+3'; Ramos 77'	Report	Gbamin (yellow card) 31'; Traoré (yellow card) 45'	Stadium: Parc des Princes; Attendance: 46,841; Referee: Abdelatif Kherradji

28 February 2026 24	Le Havre	0–1	Paris Saint-Germain	Le Havre
21:05 CET (UTC+1)	Pembélé (yellow card) 31'; Doucouré (yellow card) 84'; Ebonog (yellow card) 87'	Report	Barcola 37'; Doué (penalty missed) 79'	Stadium: Stade Océane; Attendance: 23,569; Referee: Marc Bollengier

6 March 2026 25	Paris Saint-Germain	1–3	Monaco	Paris
20:45 CET (UTC+1)	Barcola 71'; Hakimi (yellow card) 90+1'	Report	Akliouche 27'; Faes (yellow card) 45+4'; Golovin 55'; Balogun (yellow card) 71', (goal) 73'; Camara (yellow card) 76'	Stadium: Parc des Princes; Attendance: 46,806; Referee: Ruddy Buquet

21 March 2026 27	Nice	0–4	Paris Saint-Germain	Nice
21:05 CET (UTC+1)	Ndayishimiye (red card) 61'	Report	Mayulu (yellow card) 16'; Mendes 42' (pen.); Doué 49'; Dro 81'; Zaïre-Emery 85'	Stadium: Allianz Riviera; Attendance: 28,815; Referee: Willy Delajod

3 April 2026 28	Paris Saint-Germain	3–1	Toulouse	Paris
20:45 CEST (UTC+2)	Dembélé 23', 33'; Ramos 90+2'	Report	Nicolaisen 27'; Cásseres (yellow card) 36'	Stadium: Parc des Princes; Attendance: 47,710; Referee: Éric Wattellier

19 April 2026 30	Paris Saint-Germain	1–2	Lyon	Paris
20:45 CEST (UTC+2)	Zabarnyi (yellow card) 30'; Beraldo (yellow card) 30'; Ramos (penalty missed) 33'; Lee (yellow card) 65'; Hernandez (yellow card) 68'; Kvaratskhelia 90+4'; Fabián (yellow card) 90+4'	Report	Endrick 6'; Kluivert (yellow card) 13'; Moreira 18'	Stadium: Parc des Princes; Attendance: 47,926; Referee: Jérôme Brisard

22 April 2026 26	Paris Saint-Germain	3–0	Nantes	Paris
19:00 CET (UTC+1)	Kvaratskhelia 13' (pen.), 50'; Zaïre-Emery (yellow card) 35'; Doué 37'; Zabarnyi (yellow card) 41'	Report	Guilbert (yellow card) 46'	Stadium: Parc des Princes; Attendance: 47,388; Referee: Clément Turpin
Note: The match was originally scheduled for 15 March 2026, but was postponed due to Paris Saint-Germain's involvement in the UEFA Champions League.

25 April 2026 31	Angers	0–3	Paris Saint-Germain	Angers
19:00 CEST (UTC+2)		Report	Lee 7'; Ramos (yellow card) 10' (yellow-red card) 74'; Mayulu 39'; Beraldo 52'	Stadium: Stade Raymond Kopa; Attendance: 14,977; Referee: Jérémy Stinat

2 May 2026 32	Paris Saint-Germain	2–2	Lorient	Paris
17:00 CEST (UTC+2)	Mbaye 6'; Hernandez (yellow card) 47'; Zaïre-Emery 62'	Report	Pagis 12'; Tosin 78'; Yongwa (yellow card) 90+1'	Stadium: Parc des Princes; Attendance: 47,926; Referee: Bastien Dechepy

10 May 2026 33	Paris Saint-Germain	1–0	Brest	Paris
21:00 CEST (UTC+2)	Doué 82'	Report		Stadium: Parc des Princes; Attendance: 47,752; Referee: Jérôme Brisard

13 May 2026 29	Lens	0–2	Paris Saint-Germain	Lens
21:00 CEST (UTC+2)		Report	Kvaratskhelia 29'; Zabarnyi (yellow card) 45'; Mbaye 90+3'	Stadium: Stade Bollaert-Delelis; Attendance: 38,139; Referee: Benoît Bastien
Note: The match was originally scheduled for 11 April 2026, but was postponed due to Paris Saint-Germain's involvement in the UEFA Champions League.

17 May 2026 34	Paris FC	2–1	Paris Saint-Germain	Paris
21:00 CEST (UTC+2)	Gory 76', 90+4', (yellow card) 90+4'; Lopez (yellow card) 90+1'	Report	Barcola 50'	Stadium: Stade Jean-Bouin; Attendance: 19,237; Referee: Guillaume Paradis

=== Coupe de France ===
20 December 2025 Round of 64	Fontenay	0–4	Paris Saint-Germain	Nantes
21:00 CET (UTC+1)	Moisdon (yellow card) 78'	Report	Doué 25'; Dembélé 34' (pen.); Ramos 53', 58'	Stadium: Stade de la Beaujoire; Attendance: 34,601; Referee: Jérémy Stinat

12 January 2026 Round of 32	Paris Saint-Germain	0–1	Paris FC	Paris
21:10 CET (UTC+1)	Doué (yellow card) 78'; Barcola (yellow card) 87'	Report	Ikoné 74'; De Smet (yellow card) 83'; Otávio (yellow card) 90'	Stadium: Parc des Princes; Attendance: 47,000; Referee: Ruddy Buquet

=== Trophée des Champions ===
8 January 2026 Final	Paris Saint-Germain	2–2 (4–1 p)	Marseille	Kuwait City, Kuwait
21:00 AST (UTC+3)	Dembélé 13'; Zaïre-Emery (yellow card) 63'; Ramos 90+5'	Report	Weah (yellow card) 48'; Højbjerg (yellow card) 53'; Greenwood 76' (pen.); Medina (yellow card) 86'; Pacho 87' (o.g.); Aubameyang (yellow card) 89'	Stadium: Jaber Al-Ahmad International Stadium; Attendance: 52,215; Referee: Thomas Léonard
	Penalties
	Ramos (penalty scored); Vitinha (penalty scored); Mendes (penalty scored); Doué (penalty scored)		(penalty missed) O'Riley; (penalty missed) Traorè; (penalty scored) Murillo

=== UEFA Champions League ===
==== League phase ====
The draw for the league phase was held on 28 August 2025.

Pos	Team	Pld	W	D	L	GF	GA	GD	Pts	Qualification
9	(Royal Spanish Football Federation) Real Madrid	8	5	0	3	21	12	+9	15	Advance to knockout phase play-offs (seeded)
10	(Italian Football Federation) Inter Milan	8	5	0	3	15	7	+8	15	Advance to knockout phase play-offs (seeded)
11	(French Football Federation) Paris Saint-Germain	8	4	2	2	21	11	+10	14	Advance to knockout phase play-offs (seeded)
12	(The Football Association) Newcastle United	8	4	2	2	17	7	+10	14	Advance to knockout phase play-offs (seeded)
13	(Italian Football Federation) Juventus	8	3	4	1	14	10	+4	13	Advance to knockout phase play-offs (seeded)

Source: UEFA
Rules for classification: League phase tiebreakers

Round	1	2	3	4	5	6	7	8
Ground	H	A	A	H	H	A	A	H
Result	W	W	W	L	W	D	L	D
Position	2	3	1	5	2	3	6	11

Source: UEFA
A = Away; H = Home; W = Win; D = Draw; L = Loss

17 September 2025 1	Paris Saint-Germain (France)	4–0	(Italy) Atalanta	Paris, France
21:00 CEST (UTC+2)	Marquinhos 3'; Kvaratskhelia 39'; Barcola (penalty missed) 44'; Mendes 51'; Ramos 90+1'	Report	Musah (yellow card) 44'	Stadium: Parc des Princes; Attendance: 47,151; Referee: Sandro Schärer (Switzerland)

1 October 2025 2	Barcelona (Spain)	1–2	(France) Paris Saint-Germain	Barcelona, Spain
21:00 CEST (UTC+2)	Torres 19'; De Jong (yellow card) 32'; Olmo (yellow card) 57'; Casadó (yellow card) 78'; Yamal (yellow card) 90+2'	Report	Mayulu 38'; Mendes (yellow card) 44'; Hakimi (yellow card) 87'; Ramos 90'	Stadium: Estadi Olímpic Lluís Companys; Attendance: 50,207; Referee: Michael Oliver (England)

21 October 2025 3	Bayer Leverkusen (Germany)	2–7	(France) Paris Saint-Germain	Leverkusen, Germany
21:00 CEST (UTC+2)	Grimaldo (penalty missed) 25'; Andrich (red card) 31'; García 38' (pen.), 54'; Echeverri (yellow card) 43'; Tapsoba (yellow card) 45+1'	Report	Pacho 7'; Zabarnyi (yellow card) 24', (red card) 37'; Doué 41', 45+3'; Kvaratskhelia 44'; Mendes 50'; Dembélé 66'; Vitinha 90'	Stadium: BayArena; Attendance: 30,210; Referee: Jesús Gil Manzano (Spain)

4 November 2025 4	Paris Saint-Germain (France)	1–2	(Germany) Bayern Munich	Paris, France
21:00 CET (UTC+1)	Neves 74'; Mendes (yellow card) 84'	Report	Díaz 4', 32', (red card) 45+3'; Bischof (yellow card) 47'; Neuer (yellow card) 49'; Stanišić (yellow card) 84'	Stadium: Parc des Princes; Attendance: 45,747; Referee: Maurizio Mariani (Italy)

26 November 2025 5	Paris Saint-Germain (France)	5–3	(England) Tottenham Hotspur	Paris, France
21:00 CET (UTC+1)	Vitinha 45', 53', 76' (pen.); Fabián 59'; Pacho 65'; Hernandez (red card) 90+3'	Report	Richarlison 35'; Bergvall (yellow card) 45+2'; Kolo Muani 50', 73'	Stadium: Parc des Princes; Attendance: 47,574; Referee: Felix Zwayer (Germany)

10 December 2025 6	Athletic Bilbao (Spain)	0–0	(France) Paris Saint-Germain	Bilbao, Spain
21:00 CET (UTC+1)	Jauregizar (yellow card) 27'; Berenguer (yellow card) 48'; Gómez (yellow card) 90+3'	Report	Zaïre-Emery (yellow card) 30'	Stadium: San Mamés; Attendance: 51,772; Referee: Daniel Siebert (Germany)

20 January 2026 7	Sporting CP (Portugal)	2–1	(France) Paris Saint-Germain	Lisbon, Portugal
21:00 CET (UTC+1)	Mangas (yellow card) 59'; Suárez 74', 90', (yellow card) 90+4'; Silva (yellow card) 90+6'	Report	Kvaratskhelia 79', (yellow card) 90+5'	Stadium: Estádio José Alvalade; Attendance: 51,428; Referee: Anthony Taylor (England)

28 January 2026 8	Paris Saint-Germain (France)	1–1	(England) Newcastle United	Paris, France
21:00 CET (UTC+1)	Dembélé (penalty missed) 4'; Vitinha 8'	Report	Elanga (yellow card) 20'; Willock 45+2'	Stadium: Parc des Princes; Attendance: 47,637; Referee: Slavko Vinčić (Slovenia)

==== Knockout phase ====
===== Knockout phase play-offs =====
The draw for the knockout phase play-offs was held on 30 January 2026.

17 February 2026 First leg	Monaco (France)	2–3	(France) Paris Saint-Germain	Monaco
21:00 CET (UTC+1)	Balogun 1', 18'; Faes (yellow card) 21'; Zakaria (yellow card) 29'; Golovin (red card) 48'	Report	Vitinha (penalty missed) 22'; Doué 29', 67'; Hakimi 41'	Stadium: Stade Louis II; Attendance: 10,287; Referee: Jesús Gil Manzano (Spain)

25 February 2026 Second leg	Paris Saint-Germain (France)	2–2 (5–4 agg.)	(France) Monaco	Paris, France
21:00 CET (UTC+1)	Marquinhos 60'; Kvaratskhelia 66'; Safonov (yellow card) 90+4'	Report	Zakaria (yellow card) 24'; Akliouche 45'; Vanderson (yellow card) 48'; Coulibaly (yellow card) 55' (yellow-red card) 58'; Teze 90+1'; Nibombé (yellow card) 90+4'	Stadium: Parc des Princes; Attendance: 47,511; Referee: István Kovács (Romania)

===== Round of 16 =====
The draw for the round of 16 was held on 27 February 2026.

11 March 2026 First leg	Paris Saint-Germain (France)	5–2	(England) Chelsea	Paris, France
21:00 CET (UTC+1)	Barcola 10'; Dembélé 40'; Vitinha 74'; Kvaratskhelia 86', 90+4', (yellow card) 88'	Report	Gusto 28'; Fernández 57'	Stadium: Parc des Princes; Attendance: 47,566; Referee: Alejandro Hernández Hernández (Spain)

17 March 2026 Second leg	Chelsea (England)	0–3 (2–8 agg.)	(France) Paris Saint-Germain	London, England
20:00 GMT (UTC±0)		Report	Kvaratskhelia 6'; Barcola 15'; Mayulu 62'	Stadium: Stamford Bridge; Attendance: 35,811; Referee: Slavko Vinčić (Slovenia)

===== Quarter-finals =====
The draw for the quarter-finals was held on 27 February 2026, after the draw for the round of 16.

8 April 2026 First leg	Paris Saint-Germain (France)	2–0	(England) Liverpool	Paris, France
21:00 CEST (UTC+2)	Doué 11'; Kvaratskhelia 65'	Report	Gomez (yellow card) 28'; Mac Allister (yellow card) 31'	Stadium: Parc des Princes; Attendance: 47,511; Referee: José María Sánchez Martínez (Spain)

14 April 2026 Second leg	Liverpool (England)	0–2 (0–4 agg.)	(France) Paris Saint-Germain	Liverpool, England
20:00 BST (UTC+1)	Mac Allister (yellow card) 45+1'; Konaté (yellow card) 85'	Report	Dembélé 72', 90+1'	Stadium: Anfield; Attendance: 59,627; Referee: Maurizio Mariani (Italy)

===== Semi-finals =====
The draw for the semi-finals was held on 27 February 2026, after the draw for the quarter-finals.

28 April 2026 First leg	Paris Saint-Germain (France)	5–4	(Germany) Bayern Munich	Paris, France
21:00 CEST (UTC+2)	Marquinhos (yellow card) 12'; Kvaratskhelia 24', 56'; Neves 33'; Dembélé 45+5' (pen.), 58'; Fabián (yellow card) 77'; Hakimi (yellow card) 80'	Report	Kane 17' (pen.); Olise 41'; Upamecano 65'; Díaz 68'	Stadium: Parc des Princes; Attendance: 47,511; Referee: Sandro Schärer (Switzerland)

6 May 2026 Second leg	Bayern Munich (Germany)	1–1 (5–6 agg.)	(France) Paris Saint-Germain	Munich, Germany
21:00 CEST (UTC+2)	Tah (yellow card) 33'; Díaz (yellow card) 78'; Kane 90+4'; Kimmich (yellow card) 90+7'	Report	Dembélé 3'; Mendes (yellow card) 8'; Kvaratskhelia (yellow card) 45+3'; Marquinhos (yellow card) 86'	Stadium: Allianz Arena; Attendance: 75,000; Referee: João Pinheiro (Portugal)

===== Final =====
30 May 2026 Final	Paris Saint-Germain (France)	1–1 (a.e.t.) (4–3 p)	(England) Arsenal	Budapest, Hungary
18:00 CEST (UTC+2)	Dembélé 65' (pen.); Neves (yellow card) 90+6'; Mendes (yellow card) 118'	Report	Havertz 6'; Mosquera (yellow card) 47'; Saka (yellow card) 54'; Gyökeres (yellow card) 98'; Rice (yellow card) 103'	Stadium: Puskás Aréna; Attendance: 61,035; Referee: Daniel Siebert (Germany)
	Penalties
	Ramos (penalty scored); Doué (penalty scored); Mendes (penalty missed); Hakimi (penalty scored); Beraldo (penalty scored)		(penalty scored) Gyökeres; (penalty missed) Eze; (penalty scored) Rice; (penalty scored) Martinelli; (penalty missed) Gabriel

=== UEFA Super Cup ===
13 August 2025 Final	Paris Saint-Germain (France)	2–2 (4–3 p)	(England) Tottenham Hotspur	Udine, Italy
21:00 CEST (UTC+2)	Barcola (yellow card) 55'; Pacho (yellow card) 58'; Lee 85'; Dembélé (yellow card) 90'; Ramos 90+4'	Report	Van de Ven 39'; Romero 48'; Richarlison (yellow card) 53'; Danso (yellow card) 62'	Stadium: Stadio Friuli; Attendance: 21,025; Referee: João Pinheiro (Portugal)
	Penalties
	Vitinha (penalty missed); Ramos (penalty scored); Dembélé (penalty scored); Lee (penalty scored); Mendes (penalty scored)		(penalty scored) Solanke; (penalty scored) Bentancur; (penalty missed) Van de Ven; (penalty missed) Tel; (penalty scored) Porro

=== FIFA Intercontinental Cup ===
17 December 2025 Final	Paris Saint-Germain (France)	1–1 (a.e.t.) (2–1 p)	(Brazil) Flamengo	Al Rayyan, Qatar
20:00 AST (UTC+3)	Fabián (yellow card) 32'; Kvaratskhelia 38'; Vitinha (yellow card) 44'; Pacho (yellow card) 85'	Report	Jorginho (yellow card) 20', (goal) 62' (pen.); Alex Sandro (yellow card) 23'; Pulgar (yellow card) 64'; Plata (yellow card) 90+5'; Saúl (yellow card) 96'; Juninho (yellow card) 120'	Stadium: Ahmad bin Ali Stadium; Attendance: 42,150; Referee: Ismail Elfath (United States)
	Penalties
	Vitinha (penalty scored); Dembélé (penalty missed); Mendes (penalty scored); Barcola (penalty missed)		(penalty scored) De la Cruz; (penalty missed) Saúl; (penalty missed) Pedro; (penalty missed) Léo Pereira; (penalty missed) Luiz Araújo

== Statistics ==
=== Appearances and goals ===
No.	Pos	Nat	Player	Total		Ligue 1		Coupe de France		Trophée des Champions		UEFA Champions League		UEFA Super Cup		FIFA Intercontinental Cup	
No.	Pos	Nat	Player	Apps	Goals	Apps	Goals	Apps	Goals	Apps	Goals	Apps	Goals	Apps	Goals	Apps	Goals
Goalkeepers
30	GK	(France) FRA	Lucas Chevalier	26	0	17	0	1	0	1	0	6	0	1	0	0	0
39	GK	(Russia) RUS	Matvey Safonov	27	0	15	0	0	0	0	0	11	0	0	0	1	0
89	GK	(Italy) ITA	Renato Marin	3	0	2	0	1	0	0	0	0	0	0	0	0	0
Defenders
2	DF	(Morocco) MAR	Achraf Hakimi	32	3	15+3	2	0	0	0	0	13	1	1	0	0	0
4	DF	(Brazil) BRA	Lucas Beraldo	25	2	18+2	2	2	0	0	0	0+3	0	0	0	0	0
5	DF	(Brazil) BRA	Marquinhos	32	2	11+3	0	0	0	1	0	15	2	1	0	1	0
6	DF	(Ukraine) UKR	Illia Zabarnyi	37	1	26+2	1	2	0	0	0	2+5	0	0	0	0	0
21	DF	(France) FRA	Lucas Hernandez	36	0	20+5	0	1	0	0	0	0+10	0	0	0	0	0
25	DF	(Portugal) POR	Nuno Mendes	41	6	13+7	4	0+1	0	1	0	17	2	1	0	1	0
42	DF	(France) FRA	David Boly	1	0	0	0	1	0	0	0	0	0	0	0	0	0
51	DF	(Ecuador) ECU	Willian Pacho	44	2	21+2	0	1	0	1	0	17	2	1	0	1	0
54	DF	(France) FRA	Dimitri Lucea	2	0	1+1	0	0	0	0	0	0	0	0	0	0	0
Midfielders
8	MF	(Spain) ESP	Fabián Ruiz	34	2	13+7	1	1+1	0	1	0	8+1	1	0+1	0	1	0
17	MF	(Portugal) POR	Vitinha	50	7	24+5	1	1	0	1	0	17	6	1	0	1	0
19	MF	(South Korea) KOR	Lee Kang-in	39	4	17+10	3	0	0	0	0	0+10	0	0+1	1	1	0
24	MF	(France) FRA	Senny Mayulu	40	6	19+6	4	2	0	0+1	0	5+6	2	0	0	0+1	0
27	MF	(Spain) ESP	Dro Fernández	13	1	7+5	1	0	0	0	0	0+1	0	0	0	0	0
33	MF	(France) FRA	Warren Zaïre-Emery	54	3	27+5	3	2	0	1	0	15+2	0	1	0	1	0
41	MF	(France) FRA	Mathis Jangeal	2	0	0+1	0	0+1	0	0	0	0	0	0	0	0	0
45	MF	(France) FRA	Noah Nsoki	2	0	0+1	0	0+1	0	0	0	0	0	0	0	0	0
87	MF	(Portugal) POR	João Neves	38	7	13+8	5	0+1	0	1	0	13+1	2	0	0	1	0
Forwards
7	FW	(Georgia (country)) GEO	Khvicha Kvaratskhelia	48	19	18+10	8	1	0	1	0	14+2	10	1	0	1	1
9	FW	(Portugal) POR	Gonçalo Ramos	45	12	12+18	6	2	2	0+1	1	0+11	2	0+1	1	0	0
10	FW	(France) FRA	Ousmane Dembélé	40	20	10+12	10	1+1	1	1	1	11+2	8	1	0	0+1	0
14	FW	(France) FRA	Désiré Doué	41	13	16+7	7	1+1	1	1	0	9+4	5	1	0	1	0
29	FW	(France) FRA	Bradley Barcola	49	13	21+8	11	1	0	0+1	0	13+3	2	1	0	0+1	0
47	FW	(France) FRA	Quentin Ndjantou	15	1	3+7	1	1	0	0	0	1+2	0	0	0	0+1	0
49	FW	(Senegal) SEN	Ibrahim Mbaye	30	3	10+14	3	0	0	0	0	1+3	0	0+1	0	0+1	0
57	FW	(France) FRA	Pierre Mounguengue	1	0	0+1	0	0	0	0	0	0	0	0	0	0	0
Players loaned out during the season
43	DF	(France) FRA	Noham Kamara	1	0	0	0	0+1	0	0	0	0	0	0	0	0	0

Source: Competitions

== Attendance ==
=== Attendances from season to season ===
Includes all competitive home, away and neutral-site matches.
Last updated on 1 July 2026.

Season	Game type	Ligue 1 total	Ligue 1 matches	Ligue 1 average	Coupe de France total	Coupe de France matches	Coupe de France average	Trophée des Champions total	Trophée des Champions matches	Trophée des Champions average	UEFA Champions League total	UEFA Champions League matches	UEFA Champions League average	UEFA Super Cup total	UEFA Super Cup matches	UEFA Super Cup average	FIFA Intercontinental Cup total	FIFA Intercontinental Cup matches	FIFA Intercontinental Cup average	Total	Matches	Average
2025–26	Home	808,811	17	47,577	47,000	1	47,000	0	0	—	378,208	8	47,276	0	0	—	0	0	—	1,234,019	26	47,462
2025–26	Away	510,960	17	30,056	34,601	1	34,601	0	0	—	364,342	8	45,543	0	0	—	0	0	—	909,903	26	34,996
2025–26	Neutral	0	0	—	0	0	—	52,215	1	52,215	61,035	1	61,035	21,025	1	21,025	42,150	1	42,150	176,425	4	44,106
2025–26	Total	1,319,771	34	38,817	81,601	2	40,801	52,215	1	52,215	803,585	17	47,270	21,025	1	21,025	42,150	1	42,150	2,320,347	56	41,435
