= Ibrahim Mbaye =

Footballer (born 2008)

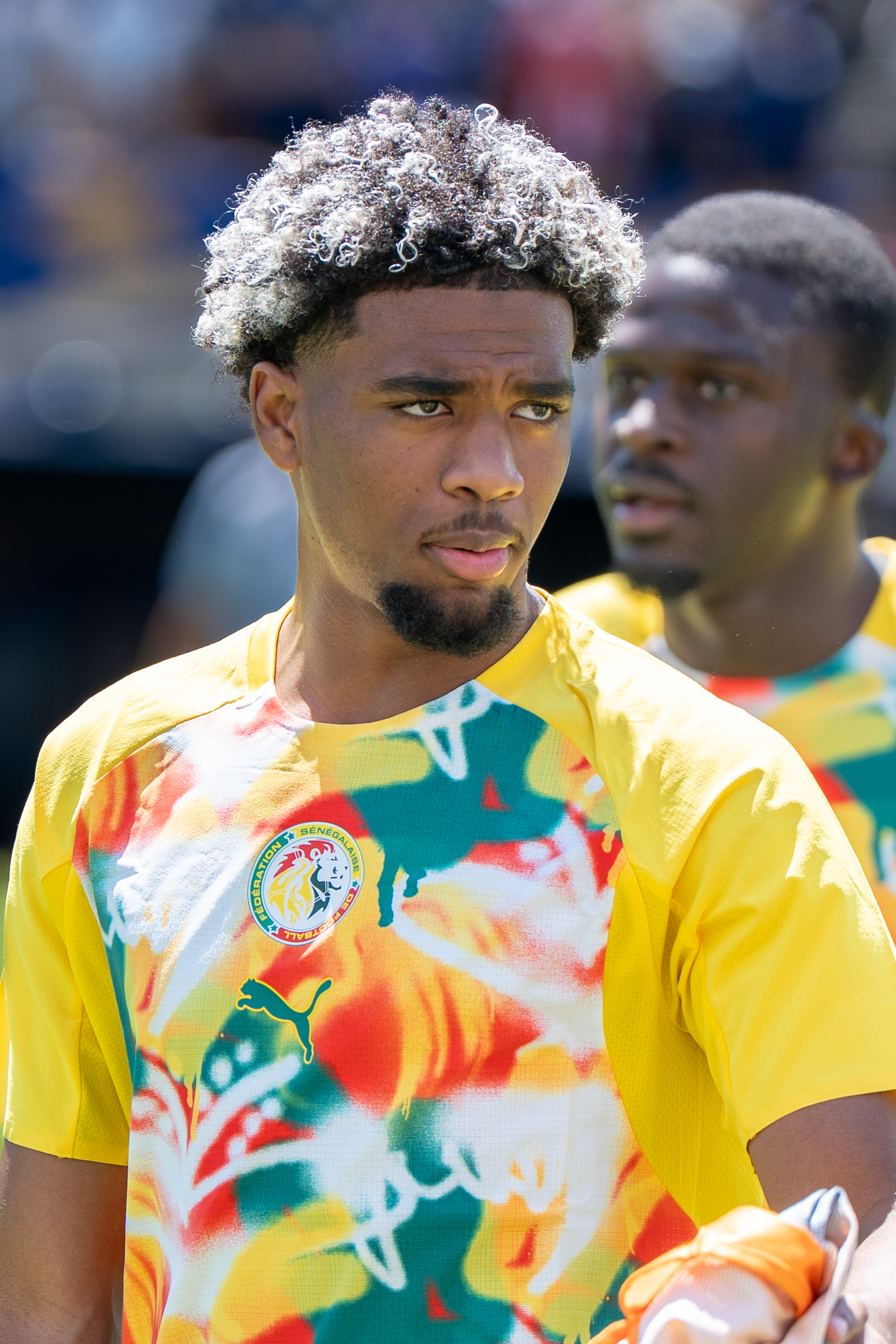
- Mbaye with Senegal in 2026

Personal information
- Full name: Ibrahim Mbaye
- Date of birth: 24 January 2008 (age 18)
- Place of birth: Trappes, Yvelines, France
- Height: 1.85 m (6 ft 1 in)
- Position: Forward

Team information
- Current team: Aston Villa
- Number: 19

Youth career
- 2013–2015: ES Guyancourt
- 2015–2018: Versailles
- 2018–2025: Paris Saint-Germain

Senior career*
Years	Team	Apps	(Gls)
2024–2026	Paris Saint-Germain	33	(4)
2026–	Aston Villa	8	(0)

International career^{‡}
2023–2024	France U16	14	(6)
2024–2025	France U17	5	(1)
2024–2025	France U18	7	(0)
2025	France U19	1	(1)
2025	France U20	3	(0)
2025–	Senegal	20	(6)
Medal record
Men's football
Representing Senegal
Africa Cup of Nations
Runner-up	2025
- * Club domestic league appearances and goals as of 21:16, 21 November 2026 (UTC) ‡ National team caps and goals as of 20:00, 16 November 2026 (UTC)

Ibrahim Mbaye (born 24 January 2008) is a professional footballer who plays as a forward for Premier League club Aston Villa. Born in France, he plays for the Senegal national team.

Born in the outer suburbs of Paris, Mbaye spent spells as a junior at local sides ES Guyancourt and Versailles before moving the Paris Saint-Germain academy aged ten. He became the youngest ever player to start a game for PSG in August 2024. Following two successful seasons at PSG, which included consecutive Ligue 1 titles, and playing in the victorious 2025–26 Champions League campaign, he signed for Aston Villa in August 2026.

A youth international for France, Mbaye regularly played above his age group, appearing for both France U19 and France U20 aged seventeen in 2025. Mbaye changed his FIFA registration in late 2025 to Senegal, becoming the youngest Senegalese ever to play at the Africa Cup of Nations. At the 2026 FIFA World Cup he became both Senegal's youngest World Cup player and the youngest African goalscorer in FIFA World Cup history.

== Early life ==
Ibrahim Mbaye was born on 24 January 2008 in Trappes, Yvelines.

== Club career ==
=== Youth career ===
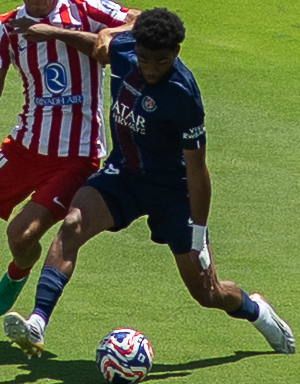
Mbaye playing for Paris Saint-Germain in 2025

Mbaye started his youth career in 2013 at ES Guyancourt before joining Versailles in 2015. In 2018, at the age of 10, he joined the Paris Saint-Germain Academy. In the 2023–24 season, while aged 16, Mbaye helped the PSG under-19s achieve victory in the Championnat National U19 play-offs, scoring against Marseille in a 2–0 win in the semi-finals and setting up Senny Mayulu's second goal in the 3–1 victory over Auxerre in the final.

=== Paris Saint-Germain ===
On 14 July 2024, Mbaye was called up for pre-season with Paris Saint-Germain's first team, having impressed head coach Luis Enrique. On 7 August, he made his first appearance and start for the club in a 2–2 friendly draw against Sturm Graz. Nine minutes into the match, he scored PSG's first goal of the season after receiving an assist from Marco Asensio. Following PSG's second pre-season match on 10 August against RB Leipzig, in which Mbaye was a starter, Luis Enrique praised Mbaye's performance, saying he was satisfied with his play.

On 16 August, Mbaye made his official debut for PSG, playing the first half of a 4–1 victory away to Le Havre, the first match of the 2024–25 Ligue 1 season. He became the youngest player to start a game for PSG at 16 years, 6 months, and 23 days, surpassing the record of his teammate Warren Zaïre-Emery. On 7 February 2025, it was announced that Mbaye had signed his first professional contract with PSG, a deal until 2027. On 26 February, he made his debut in Coupe de France by coming on as a substitute against fourth-tier side Stade Briochin, as PSG won the game 7–0 and qualified for the semi-finals. On 29 March 2025, he scored his first professional goal with PSG, in a 6–1 Ligue 1 win against Saint-Étienne.

On 15 June 2025, Mbaye was subbed on in a 4–0 win against Atlético Madrid in the 2025 FIFA Club World Cup; at the age of 17 years, 4 months and 22 days old, he became the youngest Frenchman (and the sixth youngest player overall) to play in the FIFA Club World Cup. On 13 August 2025, Mbaye came on as a substitute in the 2025 UEFA Super Cup as PSG beat Tottenham Hotspur, overtaking Ryan Giggs as the youngest player to win the UEFA Super Cup at the age of 17 years, 6 months and 19 days. He also became the youngest Frenchman to play in the Super Cup, and the second-youngest player ever after Ronald de Boer in 1987 to play in the competition.

Mbaye made his UEFA Champions League debut as a substitute in a 4–0 win over Atalanta on 17 September 2025. On 13 May 2026, he netted a stoppage-time goal in a 2–0 away win over Lens, securing his club's 14th Ligue 1 title.

=== Aston Villa ===
On 1 September 2026, Mbaye joined Premier League club Aston Villa in a deal reportedly valued at €55 million.

== International career ==
Mbaye has represented France at various youth levels. At the 2024 Montaigu Tournament, he helped the France under-16s achieve victory while picking up the award for the competition's best player. He was part of the France under-18s that finished third in the 2024 Lafarge Foot Avenir.

In November 2025, Mbaye received his first call-up to the Senegal national team, making his debut against Brazil on 15 November. Three days later, on 18 November, on his second cap, he scored his first international goal in an 8–0 victory in a friendly game against Kenya, becoming at 17 years 9 months and 25 days Senegal’s youngest ever goalscorer. On 15 December 2025, Mbaye's request to switch international allegiance to Senegal was approved by FIFA.

On 23 December 2025, he played Senegal’s first group stage game at the 2025 Africa Cup of Nations against Botswana, which is held in his maternal ancestral Morocco, to become at 17 years 10 months and 29 days the youngest Senegalese ever to play at the Africa Cup of Nations. On 3 January 2026, he scored his second goal with Senegal in a 3–1 win over Sudan in the 2025 Africa Cup of Nations round of 16, to become, at 17 years 11 months and 10 days, his country's youngest ever goalscorer in the Africa Cup of Nations.

On 21 May 2026, Mbaye was officially selected by Senegal's coach Pape Thiaw from his list of 28 players to participate in the 2026 FIFA World Cup. A month later, on 16 June, he came on as a substitute and scored in a 3–1 defeat against France on his World Cup debut, becoming at 18 years and 142 days both Senegal's youngest player and the youngest African goalscorer in FIFA World Cup history.

== Personal life ==
Born in France, Mbaye is of Moroccan descent through his mother and Senegalese descent through his father.

== Career statistics ==
=== Club ===
As of match played 21 November 2026

Appearances and goals by club, season and competition
Club	Season	League			National cup (Note: Includes Coupe de France, FA Cup)		League cup (Note: Includes EFL Cup)		Europe		Other		Total	
Club	Season	Division	Apps	Goals	Apps	Goals	Apps	Goals	Apps	Goals	Apps	Goals	Apps	Goals
Paris Saint-Germain	2024–25	Ligue 1	9	1	1	0	—		0	0	2 (Note: Appearances in FIFA Club World Cup)	0	12	1
Paris Saint-Germain	2025–26	Ligue 1	24	3	0	0	—		4 (Note: Appearances in UEFA Champions League)	0	2 (Note: One appearance in UEFA Super Cup, one appearance in FIFA Intercontinental Cup)	0	30	3
Paris Saint-Germain	Total		33	4	1	0	—		4	0	4	0	42	4
Aston Villa	2026–27	Premier League	8	0	0	0	2	0	3	0	—		13	0
Career total			41	4	1	0	2	0	7	0	4	0	55	4

=== International ===
As of match played 16 November 2026

Appearances and goals by national team and year
National team	Year	Apps	Goals
Senegal	2025	5	1
Senegal	2026	15	5
Total		20	6

Scores and results list Senegal's goal tally first, score column indicates score after each Mbaye goal.

List of international goals scored by Ibrahim Mbaye
No.	Date	Venue	Cap	Opponent	Score	Result	Competition
1	18 November 2025	Antalya Stadium, Antalya, Turkey	2	Kenya	7–0	8–0	Friendly
2	3 January 2026	Tangier Grand Stadium, Tangier, Morocco	6	Sudan	3–1	3–1	2025 Africa Cup of Nations
3	31 March 2026	Diamniadio Olympic Stadium, Diamniadio, Senegal	10	Gambia	2–0	3–1	Friendly
4	16 June 2026	MetLife Stadium, East Rutherford, United States	12	France	1–2	1–3	2026 FIFA World Cup
5	29 September 2026	Bahir Dar Stadium, Bahir Dar, Ethiopia	17	Ethiopia	1–0	1–0	2027 Africa Cup of Nations qualification
6	12 November 2026	Leopold Sédar Senghor Stadium, Dakar, Senegal	19	Sudan	3–1	4–1	2027 Africa Cup of Nations qualification

== Honours ==
Paris Saint-Germain U19

- Championnat National U19: 2023–24, 2024–25, 2025–26

Paris Saint-Germain

- Ligue 1: 2024–25, 2025–26
- Coupe de France: 2024–25
- UEFA Champions League: 2024–25, 2025–26
- UEFA Super Cup: 2025, 2026
- FIFA Intercontinental Cup: 2025
- FIFA Club World Cup runner-up: 2025

France U16

- Montaigu Tournament: 2024

France U20

- Maurice Revello Tournament: 2025

Senegal

- Africa Cup of Nations runner-up: 2025

Individual

- Montaigu Tournament Best Player: 2024
- Titi d'Or: 2024
