= 2025 UEFA Super Cup =

European football match

- Match programme cover
Paris Saint-Germain	Tottenham Hotspur
(French Football Federation)	(The Football Association)
2	2
- Paris Saint-Germain won 4–3 on penalties
- Date: 13 August 2025
- Venue: Stadio Friuli, Udine
- Man of the Match: Ousmane Dembélé (Paris Saint-Germain)
- Referee: João Pinheiro (Portugal)
- Attendance: 21,025
- Weather: Clear night 27 °C (81 °F); 63% humidity

The 2025 UEFA Super Cup was the 50th edition of the UEFA Super Cup, an annual football match organised by UEFA and contested by the reigning champions of the top two European club competitions, the UEFA Champions League and the UEFA Europa League. It was played at the Stadio Friuli in Udine, Italy, on 13 August 2025. It was contested by French club Paris Saint-Germain, winners of the 2024–25 UEFA Champions League, and English club Tottenham Hotspur, winners of the 2024–25 UEFA Europa League.

Paris Saint-Germain won the match 4–3 on penalties, following a 2–2 draw after 90 minutes, for their first UEFA Super Cup title. In doing so, they became the first French club to win the competition. Tottenham became the first club ever to lead by two goals without winning the competition.

== Teams ==
Team	Qualification	Previous participations
(French Football Federation) Paris Saint-Germain	Winners of the 2024–25 UEFA Champions League	1 (1996)
(The Football Association) Tottenham Hotspur	Winners of the 2024–25 UEFA Europa League	None

== Venue ==
=== Host selection ===
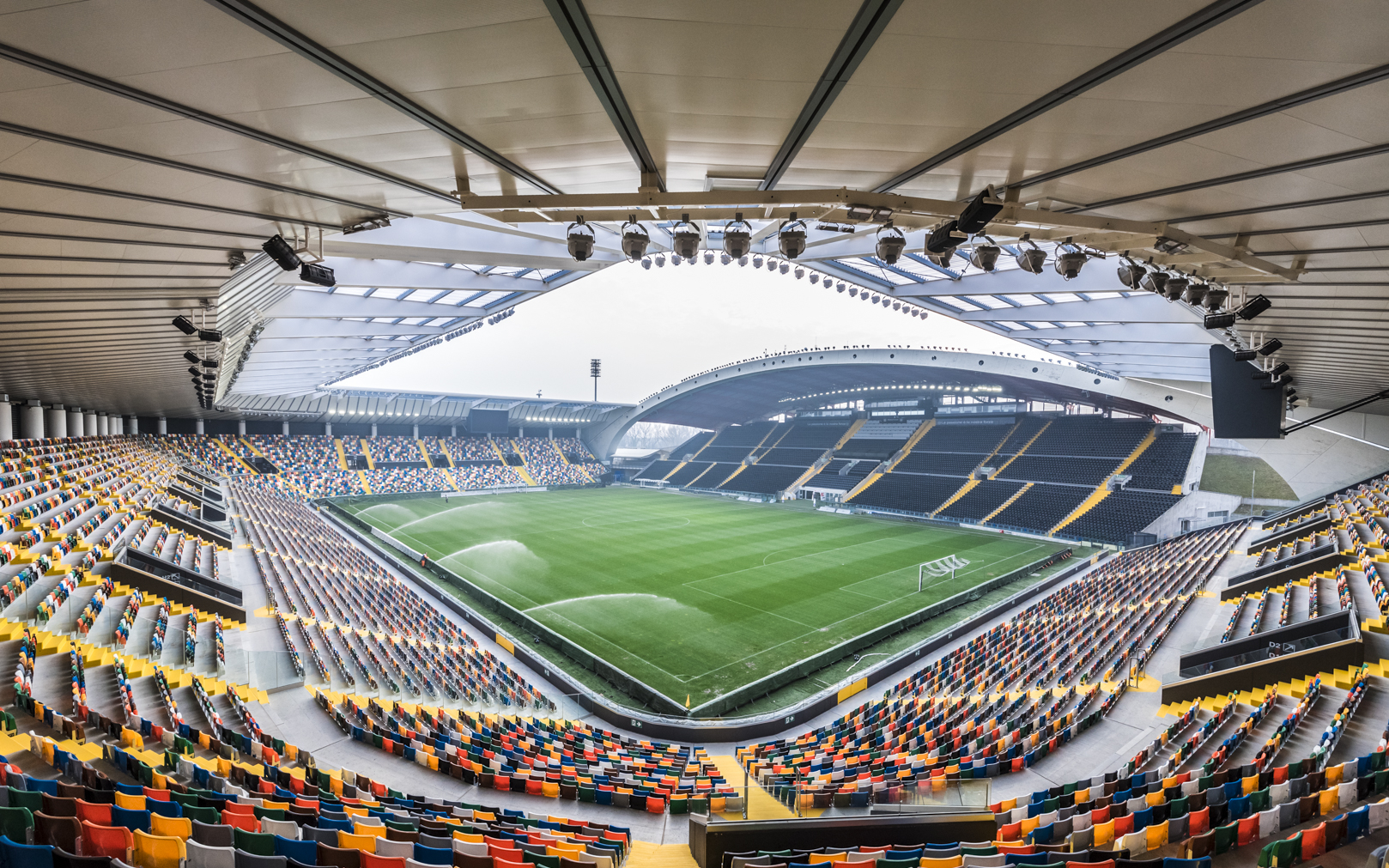
The Stadio Friuli in Udine hosted the match.

The Stadio Friuli in Udine, Italy, was appointed as host stadium by the UEFA Executive Committee during their meeting in Lausanne, Switzerland, on 16 December 2024.

== Match ==
=== Summary ===
In the 39th minute, Micky van de Ven put Tottenham Hotspur into the lead with close range finish after Lucas Chevalier had tipped João Palhinha's effort onto the crossbar. It was 2–0 in the 48th minute when Cristian Romero scored with a downward header from the left after a free-kick from Pedro Porro which went into the right of the net past Lucas Chevalier who had got both hands to it. With five minutes left, Lee Kang-in got a goal back for Paris Saint-Germain with a low shot from 20 yards into the right corner of the net, and in the fourth minute of added time Gonçalo Ramos got the equaliser when he headed the ball into the net from close range after a cross from Ousmane Dembélé on the right. The match finished 2–2 and went straight to a penalty shoot-out. Nuno Mendes scored the winning penalty to give the trophy to Paris Saint-Germain for the first time, 4–3 on penalties.

=== Details ===
The Champions League winners were designated as the "home" team for administrative purposes.

13 August 2025
21:00 UTC+2

Paris Saint-Germain (French Football Federation)	2–2	(The Football Association) Tottenham Hotspur
Lee Kang-in 85'; Ramos 90+4'	Report	Van de Ven 39'; Romero 48'
Penalties
Vitinha (penalty missed); Ramos (penalty scored); Dembélé (penalty scored); Lee Kang-in (penalty scored); Mendes (penalty scored)	4–3	(penalty scored) Solanke; (penalty scored) Bentancur; (penalty missed) Van de Ven; (penalty missed) Tel; (penalty scored) Porro

Stadio Friuli, Udine
Attendance: 21,025
Referee: João Pinheiro (Portugal)

Paris Saint-Germain	Tottenham Hotspur

GK	30	(France) Lucas Chevalier
RB	2	(Morocco) Achraf Hakimi
CB	5	(Brazil) Marquinhos (c)
CB	51	(Ecuador) Willian Pacho	(yellow card) 58'
LB	25	(Portugal) Nuno Mendes
RM	14	(France) Désiré Doué		(substituted off) 77'
CM	33	(France) Warren Zaïre-Emery		(substituted off) 68'
CM	17	(Portugal) Vitinha
LM	29	(France) Bradley Barcola	(yellow card) 55'	(substituted off) 68'
CF	10	(France) Ousmane Dembélé	(yellow card) 90'
CF	7	(Georgia (country)) Khvicha Kvaratskhelia		(substituted off) 60'
Substitutes:
GK	39	(Russia) Matvey Safonov
GK	89	(Italy) Renato Marin
DF	4	(Brazil) Lucas Beraldo
DF	21	(France) Lucas Hernandez
DF	43	(France) Noham Kamara
MF	8	(Spain) Fabián Ruiz		(substituted on) 60'
MF	19	(South Korea) Lee Kang-in		(substituted on) 68'
FW	9	(Portugal) Gonçalo Ramos		(substituted on) 77'
FW	49	(France) Ibrahim Mbaye		(substituted on) 68'
Manager:
(Spain) Luis Enrique

GK	1	(Italy) Guglielmo Vicario
CB	17	(Argentina) Cristian Romero (c)
CB	4	(Austria) Kevin Danso	(yellow card) 62'
CB	37	(Netherlands) Micky van de Ven
RM	23	(Spain) Pedro Porro
CM	6	(Portugal) João Palhinha		(substituted off) 72'
CM	29	(Senegal) Pape Matar Sarr		(substituted off) 90'
CM	30	(Uruguay) Rodrigo Bentancur
LM	24	(England) Djed Spence
SS	20	(Ghana) Mohammed Kudus		(substituted off) 79'
CF	9	(Brazil) Richarlison	(yellow card) 53'	(substituted off) 72'
Substitutes:
GK	31	(Czech Republic) Antonín Kinský
GK	40	(United States) Brandon Austin
DF	33	(Wales) Ben Davies
DF	67	(England) Jun'ai Byfield
DF	80	(Croatia) Luka Vušković
MF	14	(England) Archie Gray		(substituted on) 72'
MF	15	(Sweden) Lucas Bergvall		(substituted on) 90'
FW	11	(France) Mathys Tel		(substituted on) 79'
FW	19	(England) Dominic Solanke		(substituted on) 72'
FW	22	(Wales) Brennan Johnson
FW	28	(France) Wilson Odobert
Manager:
(Denmark) Thomas Frank

Man of the Match:
Ousmane Dembélé (Paris Saint-Germain)

Assistant referees:
Bruno Jesus (Portugal)
Luciano Maia (Portugal)
Fourth official:
Elchin Masiyev (Azerbaijan)
Video assistant referee:
Tiago Martins (Portugal)
Assistant video assistant referees:
Fábio Oliveira Melo (Portugal)
Pol van Boekel (Netherlands)

Match rules

- 90 minutes
- Penalty shoot-out if scores level
- Maximum of twelve named substitutes
- Maximum of five substitutions
- Maximum of three substitution opportunities

=== Statistics ===
First half
Statistic	Paris Saint-Germain	Tottenham Hotspur
Goals scored	0	1
Total shots	4	9
Shots on target	0	3
Saves	2	0
Ball possession	66%	34%
Corner kicks	3	1
Fouls committed	3	4
Offsides	0	3
Yellow cards	0	0
Red cards	0	0

Second half
Statistic	Paris Saint-Germain	Tottenham Hotspur
Goals scored	2	1
Total shots	8	4
Shots on target	3	2
Saves	1	1
Ball possession	69%	31%
Corner kicks	4	1
Fouls committed	9	8
Offsides	2	1
Yellow cards	3	2
Red cards	0	0

Overall
Statistic	Paris Saint-Germain	Tottenham Hotspur
Goals scored	2	2
Total shots	12	13
Shots on target	3	5
Saves	3	1
Ball possession	67%	33%
Corner kicks	7	2
Fouls committed	12	12
Offsides	2	4
Yellow cards	3	2
Red cards	0	0

== See also ==
- 2025 UEFA Champions League final
- 2025 UEFA Europa League final
- 2025–26 UEFA Champions League
- 2025–26 UEFA Europa League
- 2025–26 Paris Saint-Germain FC season
- 2025–26 Tottenham Hotspur F.C. season
- Paris Saint-Germain FC in international football
- Tottenham Hotspur F.C. in European football
