= Noah Nsoki =

French footballer (born 2007)

Personal information
- Date of birth: 20 February 2007 (age 19)
- Place of birth: Tournan-en-Brie, France
- Position: Winger

Team information
- Current team: Dinamo Zagreb
- Number: 77

Youth career
- 2020–2026: Paris Saint-Germain

Senior career*
Years	Team	Apps	(Gls)
2025–2026	Paris Saint-Germain	1	(0)
2026–	Dinamo Zagreb	0	(0)
- * Club domestic league appearances and goals as of 21:43, 4 January 2026 (UTC)

Noah Nsoki (born 20 February 2007) is a French professional footballer who plays as a winger for Croatian Football League club Dinamo Zagreb.

== Career ==
Having joined Paris Saint-Germain (PSG) in 2020, Nsoki signed a scholarship contract with the club in April 2025, extending his stay until June 2027. On 20 December 2025, he was called up to the senior team for the first time ahead of a Coupe de France round of 64 match against amateur side Fontenay. He eventually made his debut in the match, coming on as a substitute at the 61st minute for Désiré Doué.

On 8 August 2026, Nsoki signed for Croatian Football League club Dinamo Zagreb on a free transfer, with Paris Saint-Germain retaining a 50% sell-on clause.

== Personal life ==
Born in France, Nsoki is of Congolese descent from the Democratic Republic of the Congo. His cousin Stanley Nsoki is also a professional footballer that came through the ranks of the Paris Saint-Germain Youth Academy.

== Career statistics ==
As of match played 9 September 2026

Appearances and goals by club, season and competition
Club	Season	League			National cup		Europe		Other		Total	
Club	Season	Division	Apps	Goals	Apps	Goals	Apps	Goals	Apps	Goals	Apps	Goals
Paris Saint-Germain	2025–26	Ligue 1	1	0	1	0	0	0	0	0	2	0
Dinamo Zagreb	2026–27	Croatian Football League	0	0	1	0	0	0	—		1	0
Career total			1	0	2	0	0	0	0	0	3	0

== Honours ==
Paris Saint-Germain U19

- Championnat National U19: 2024–25, 2025–26

Paris Saint-Germain

- Ligue 1: 2025–26
- Trophée des Champions: 2025
