= Dimitri Lucea =

French footballer (born 2007)

Personal information
- Date of birth: 20 January 2007 (age 19)
- Place of birth: Tremblay-en-France, France
- Height: 1.89 m (6 ft 2 in)
- Position: Defender

Team information
- Current team: Paris Saint-Germain
- Number: 54

Youth career
- 2012–2022: Tremblay FC
- 2022–2025: Lille
- 2025–2026: Paris Saint-Germain

Senior career*
Years	Team	Apps	(Gls)
2026–	Paris Saint-Germain	2	(0)

International career^{‡}
2025–	France U19	7	(0)
- * Club domestic league appearances and goals as of 21:50, 17 May 2026 (UTC) ‡ National team caps and goals as of 31 March 2026

Dimitri Lucea (born 20 January 2007) is a French professional footballer who plays as a defender for Ligue 1 club Paris Saint-Germain.

== Club career ==
As a youth player, Lucea joined the youth academy of Tremblay FC. Following his stint there, he joined the academy of Ligue 1 club Lille in 2022. In 2025, he joined the academy of Ligue 1 club Paris Saint-Germain (PSG). On 13 May 2026, Lucea made his professional debut with PSG in a 2–0 win over Lens, becoming the 525th player to play for the senior team.

== International career ==
Lucea is a France youth international. During the autumn of 2025 and the spring of 2026, he played for the France under-17s for 2026 UEFA European Under-19 Championship qualification.

== Style of play ==
Lucea plays as a defender. French newspaper L'Équipe wrote in 2025 that "what is striking about him is his love of duels, his ferocity in one-on-one situations... while he still has significant room for improvement in his passing game".

== Career statistics ==
As of matches played 17 May 2026

Appearances and goals by club, season and competition
Club	Season	League			Coupe de France		Europe		Other		Total	
Club	Season	Division	Apps	Goals	Apps	Goals	Apps	Goals	Apps	Goals	Apps	Goals
Paris Saint-Germain	2025–26	Ligue 1	2	0	0	0	0	0	0	0	2	0
Career total			2	0	0	0	0	0	0	0	2	0

== Honours ==
Paris Saint-Germain U19

- Championnat National U19: 2025–26

Paris Saint-Germain

- Ligue 1: 2025–26
