= Noham Kamara =

French footballer (born 2007)

Personal information
- Full name: Noham Fadjigui Kamara
- Date of birth: 22 January 2007 (age 19)
- Place of birth: Meaux, France
- Height: 1.83 m (6 ft 0 in)
- Position: Centre-back

Team information
- Current team: Lyon
- Number: 85

Youth career
- –2018: Meaux
- 2018–2024: Torcy
- 2024–2025: Paris Saint-Germain

Senior career*
Years	Team	Apps	(Gls)
2025–2026	Paris Saint-Germain	2	(0)
2026	→ Lyon (loan)	2	(0)
2026–	Lyon	0	(0)
2026–	Lyon B	3	(0)

International career^{‡}
2025–	France U20	10	(0)
- * Club domestic league appearances and goals as of 19 September 2026 ‡ National team caps and goals as of 3 October 2026

Noham Fadjigui Kamara (born 22 January 2007) is a French professional footballer who plays as a centre-back for Ligue 1 club Lyon.

== Club career ==
Kamara began playing football for Meaux in his hometown before joining Torcy in the under-12 age group. On 19 June 2024, he joined the under-19 side of Paris Saint-Germain (PSG), signing a one-year contract. He signed his first "intern" contract with the club on 24 March 2025, an agreement lasting until 2027. That same week, he was invited for the first time to a senior team training session by head coach Luis Enrique. On 3 May 2025, Kamara made his professional debut in a 2–1 Ligue 1 defeat to Strasbourg, having come on as a substitute at halftime for Lucas Hernandez. On 21 August 2025, he signed his first professional contract with Paris Saint-Germain, a deal until 2028.

On 2 February 2026, Kamara signed for Ligue 1 club Lyon on loan until the end of the season, with an option to buy for €4 million and up to €2 million in potential bonuses. The transfer was completed for €4.1 million on 10 June 2026.

== International career ==
Kamara was born to a Senegalese-Mauritanian father and French mother. He is a France youth international, having competed at the 2025 FIFA U-20 World Cup.

== Career statistics ==
As of 22 October 2026

Appearances and goals by club, season and competition
Club	Season	League			National Cup		Continental		Other		Total	
Club	Season	Division	Apps	Goals	Apps	Goals	Apps	Goals	Apps	Goals	Apps	Goals
Paris Saint-Germain	2024–25	Ligue 1	2	0	0	0	0	0	0	0	2	0
Paris Saint-Germain	2025–26	Ligue 1	0	0	1	0	0	0	0	0	1	0
Paris Saint-Germain	Total		2	0	1	0	0	0	0	0	3	0
Lyon (loan)	2025–26	Ligue 1	2	0	0	0	0	0	—		2	0
Lyon	2026–27	Ligue 1	0	0	0	0	1 (Note: Appearances in UEFA Europa League)	0	—		1	0
Lyon	Total		2	0	0	0	1	0	0	0	3	0
Lyon B	2026–27	Championnat National 2	3	0	—		—		—		3	0
Career total			7	0	1	0	1	0	0	0	9	0

== Honours ==
Paris Saint-Germain U19

- Championnat National U19: 2024–25, 2025–26

Paris Saint-Germain

- Ligue 1: 2024–25
- UEFA Super Cup: 2025
- FIFA Club World Cup runner-up: 2025
