= 2025 Trophée des Champions =

- The Jaber Al-Ahmad International Stadium, pictured above, hosted the match
- Event: Trophée des Champions
Paris Saint-Germain	Marseille
2	2
- Paris Saint-Germain won 4–1 on penalties
- Date: 8 January 2026
- Venue: Jaber Al-Ahmad International Stadium, Kuwait City
- Man of the Match: Lucas Chevalier (Paris Saint-Germain)
- Referee: Thomas Léonard
- Attendance: 52,215

The 2025 Trophée des Champions was the 30th edition of the French super cup. It took place on 8 January 2026 at the Jaber Al-Ahmad International Stadium in Kuwait City, Kuwait. The match was contested by Paris Saint-Germain, the winners of the 2024–25 Ligue 1 and Coupe de France titles, and Marseille, the runners-up of the 2024–25 Ligue 1. This was the third Trophée des Champions to feature the two rivals.

Paris Saint-Germain won the match 4–1 on penalties for their fourteenth Trophée des Champions title. They also successfully became only the third club to have ever won the sextuple.

== Background ==
This was the 111th competitive Le Classique and the third in a Trophée des Champions match, having met in the 2010 and 2020 editions; Marseille won the former and Paris Saint-Germain won the latter. Paris Saint-Germain, having played all Trophée matches since 2013, were aiming for their fourth consecutive and a record-extending fourteenth title, while Marseille were aiming for their fourth overall title and the first since 2011, as well as a first competitive trophy since winning the 2011–12 Coupe de la Ligue. Marseille won the most recent meeting between the sides, a 1–0 league victory on 22 September 2025.

== Match ==
=== Details ===
8 January 2026
21:00 AST

Paris Saint-Germain	2–2	Marseille
Dembélé 13'; Ramos 90+5'	Report	Greenwood 76' (pen.); Pacho 87' (o.g.)
Penalties
Ramos (penalty scored); Vitinha (penalty scored); Mendes (penalty scored); Doué (penalty scored)	4–1	(penalty missed) O'Riley; (penalty missed) Traorè; (penalty scored) Murillo

Jaber Al-Ahmad International Stadium, Kuwait City
Attendance: 52,215
Referee: Thomas Léonard

Paris Saint-Germain	Marseille

GK	30	(France) Lucas Chevalier
RB	33	(France) Warren Zaïre-Emery	(yellow card) 63'	(substituted off) 89'
CB	5	(Brazil) Marquinhos (c)
CB	51	(Ecuador) Willian Pacho
LB	25	(Portugal) Nuno Mendes
DM	17	(Portugal) Vitinha
CM	87	(Portugal) João Neves
CM	8	(Spain) Fabián Ruiz		(substituted off) 89'
RF	14	(France) Désiré Doué
CF	10	(France) Ousmane Dembélé
LF	7	(Georgia (country)) Khvicha Kvaratskhelia		(substituted off) 72'
Substitutes:
GK	60	(France) Martin James
GK	89	(Italy) Renato Marin
DF	4	(Brazil) Lucas Beraldo
DF	6	(Ukraine) Illia Zabarnyi
DF	21	(France) Lucas Hernandez
MF	24	(France) Senny Mayulu		(substituted on) 89'
MF	45	(France) Noah Nsoki
FW	9	(Portugal) Gonçalo Ramos		(substituted on) 89'
FW	29	(France) Bradley Barcola		(substituted on) 72'
Manager:
(Spain) Luis Enrique

GK	1	(Argentina) Gerónimo Rulli
CB	28	(France) Benjamin Pavard
CB	5	(Argentina) Leonardo Balerdi (c)
CB	32	(Argentina) Facundo Medina	(yellow card) 86'
RM	22	(United States) Timothy Weah	(yellow card) 48'	(substituted off) 77'
CM	19	(Central African Republic) Geoffrey Kondogbia
CM	23	(Denmark) Pierre-Emile Højbjerg	(yellow card) 53'
LM	33	(Italy) Emerson Palmieri
RW	10	(England) Mason Greenwood		(substituted off) 90+2'
LW	14	(Brazil) Igor Paixão		(substituted off) 67'
CF	9	(Algeria) Amine Gouiri		(substituted off) 67'
Substitutes:
GK	12	(Netherlands) Jeffrey de Lange
DF	4	(England) CJ Egan-Riley
DF	62	(Panama) Michael Amir Murillo		(substituted on) 77'
MF	17	(Denmark) Matt O'Riley		(substituted on) 90+2'
MF	20	(Ivory Coast) Hamed Traorè		(substituted on) 67'
MF	50	(France) Darryl Bakola
FW	7	(France) Neal Maupay
FW	34	(France) Robinio Vaz
FW	97	(Gabon) Pierre-Emerick Aubameyang	(yellow card) 89'	(substituted on) 67'
Manager:
(Italy) Roberto De Zerbi

Man of the Match:
Lucas Chevalier (Paris Saint-Germain)

Assistant referees:
Huseyin Ocak
Ludovic Reyes
Fourth official:
Guillaume Paradis
Video assistant referee:
Bastien Dechepy
Assistant video assistant referee:
Julien Schmitt

Match rules

- 90 minutes
- Penalty shoot-out if scores level
- Maximum of nine named substitutes
- Maximum of five substitutions
- Maximum of three substitution opportunities

== See also ==
- 2025–26 Ligue 1
- 2025–26 Coupe de France
- 2025–26 Paris Saint-Germain FC season
- 2025–26 Olympique de Marseille season
