= Lucas Chevalier =

French footballer (born 2001)

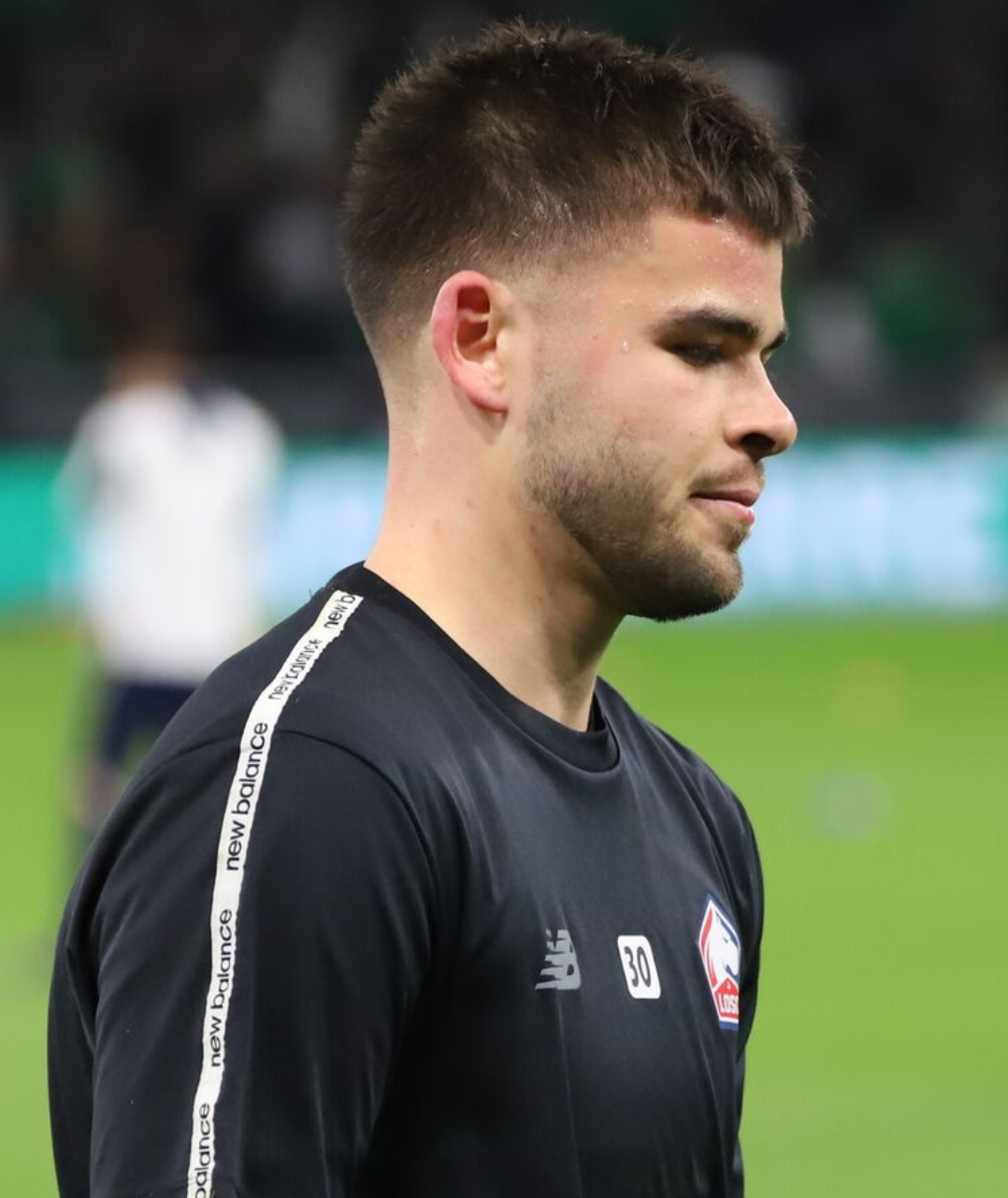
- Chevalier with Lille in 2024

Personal information
- Full name: Lucas Eugène Chevalier
- Date of birth: 6 November 2001 (age 25)
- Place of birth: Calais, Pas-de-Calais, France
- Height: 1.89 m (6 ft 2 in)
- Position: Goalkeeper

Team information
- Current team: Paris Saint-Germain
- Number: 30

Youth career
- 2008–2010: SC Coquellois
- 2010–2014: AS Marck
- 2014–2018: Lille

Senior career*
Years	Team	Apps	(Gls)
2018–2022	Lille B	38	(0)
2021–2025	Lille	99	(0)
2021	→ Valenciennes B (loan)	1	(0)
2021–2022	→ Valenciennes (loan)	30	(0)
2025–	Paris Saint-Germain	17	(0)

International career^{‡}
2017	France U16	1	(0)
2018–2019	France U18	4	(0)
2021	France U20	1	(0)
2022–2023	France U21	6	(0)
2024	France Olympic	1	(0)
2025–	France	1	(0)
Medal record
Men's football
Representing France
UEFA Nations League
Third place	2025 Germany
- * Club domestic league appearances and goals as of 23:35, 23 January 2026 (UTC) ‡ National team caps and goals as of 19:00, 16 November 2025 (UTC)

Lucas Eugène Chevalier (French pronunciation: [lykɑ ʃəvalje]; born 6 November 2001) is a French professional footballer who plays as a goalkeeper for Ligue 1 club Paris Saint-Germain and the France national team.

== Club career ==
=== Lille ===
Chevalier is a youth academy graduate of Lille. He was third-choice goalkeeper of club behind Mike Maignan and Orestis Karnezis during their league title winning 2020–21 season. In July 2021, he joined Ligue 2 club Valenciennes on a season long loan deal. He made his professional debut for the club on 18 September 2021 in a 1–1 draw against Pau.

On 10 September 2022, Chevalier made his professional debut for his boyhood club with a strong performance against Marseille. A few weeks later, on 9 October, he stopped a penalty kick and made decisive saves in Lille's 1–0 home win over Derby du Nord rivals Lens. He was praised for his performance that earned him a rating of 8/10 in La Voix du Nord and a spot in L'Équipe's Team of the Week. After the game, he told to Prime Video Sport pundit Thierry Henry that former Lille keeper Mike Maignan phoned him before the game to advise and encourage him. In January 2023, Chevalier extended his contract with Lille until June 2027.

On 2 October 2024, in his third season as Lille's starting goalkeeper, he took part in the 1–0 home win against Real Madrid in the 2024–25 UEFA Champions League league phase. Being one of the best Lille players on the pitch, his performance was praised by various national and international media including L'Équipe which gave him a rare rating of 9/10 after the match.

=== Paris Saint-Germain ===
On 9 August 2025, Chevalier moved to fellow Ligue 1 club Paris Saint-Germain, signing a five-year deal. Four days later, on 13 August 2025, Chevalier made his PSG debut at 2025 UEFA Super Cup against Tottenham Hotspur after PSG's first-choice goalkeeper Gianluigi Donnarumma was left out of the PSG squad. Chevalier played a major role during the penalty shootout, saving a penalty from Tottenham's Micky van de Ven as PSG went on to win the shootout 4–3.

On 8 January 2026, Chevalier helped Paris Saint-Germain win the Trophée des Champions against Marseille, saving two penalties in the shootout as the club triumphed 4–1 after the match ended 2–2. However, he lost his place in the starting lineup during the second half of the 2025–26 season, with Matvey Safonov becoming PSG's first-choice goalkeeper ahead of him.

== International career ==
Chevalier is a former French youth international. He has appeared for under-16 and under-18 teams in friendlies. In 2024, he was called up to the France Olympic football team for the Olympics football tournament in a preliminary list alongside his Lille teammates Bafodé Diakité and Leny Yoro. However, the three players were eventually retained by their club due to the 2024–25 UEFA Champions League qualifying phase and play-off round played in August before the start of the Ligue 1 season.

On 7 November 2024, Chevalier received his first call-up to the France national team. He made his debut in a 3–1 win over Azerbaijan on 16 November 2025 in 2026 FIFA World Cup qualification.

== Personal life ==
Chevalier is a Christian, specifically a Protestant.

In November 2025, he came under criticism after liking an Instagram post from former Les Républicains MP Julien Aubert. Chevalier stated in a post on Instagram that the entire affair "pissed him off" due to his family being the target of harassment and certain people portraying him as a fascist as a result of liking the Instagram post.

== Career statistics ==
=== Club ===
As of match played 23 January 2026

Appearances and goals by club, season and competition
Club	Season	League			Coupe de France		Europe		Other		Total	
Club	Season	Division	Apps	Goals	Apps	Goals	Apps	Goals	Apps	Goals	Apps	Goals
Lille B	2018–19	Championnat National 2	19	0	—		—		—		19	0
Lille B	2019–20	Championnat National 2	17	0	—		—		—		17	0
Lille B	2020–21	Championnat National 3	1	0	—		—		—		1	0
Lille B	2022–23	Championnat National 3	1	0	—		—		—		1	0
Lille B	Total		38	0	—		—		—		38	0
Lille	2020–21	Ligue 1	1	0	0	0	0	0	0	0	0	0
Lille	2022–23	Ligue 1	32	0	3	0	—		—		35	0
Lille	2023–24	Ligue 1	33	0	2	0	9 (Note: Appearances in UEFA Europa Conference League)	0	—		44	0
Lille	2024–25	Ligue 1	34	0	0	0	14 (Note: Appearances in UEFA Champions League)	0	—		48	0
Lille	Total		99	0	5	0	23	0	0	0	127	0
Valenciennes B (loan)	2021–22	Championnat National 3	1	0	—		—		—		1	0
Valenciennes (loan)	2021–22	Ligue 2	30	0	0	0	—		—		30	0
Paris Saint-Germain	2025–26	Ligue 1	17	0	1	0	6	0	2 (Note: One appearance in UEFA Super Cup, one appearance in Trophée des Champions)	0	26	0
Career total			185	0	6	0	29	0	2	0	222	0

=== International ===
As of match played 16 November 2025

Appearances and goals by national team and year
National team	Year	Apps	Goals
France	2025	1	0
Total		1	0

== Honours ==
Paris Saint-Germain

- Ligue 1: 2025–26
- Trophée des Champions: 2025
- UEFA Champions League: 2025–26
- UEFA Super Cup: 2025, 2026
- FIFA Intercontinental Cup: 2025

France

- UEFA Nations League third place: 2024–25

Individual

- UNFP Ligue 1 Goalkeeper of the Year: 2024–25
- UNFP Ligue 1 Team of the Year: 2024–25
