= Lucas Beraldo =

Brazilian footballer (born 2003)

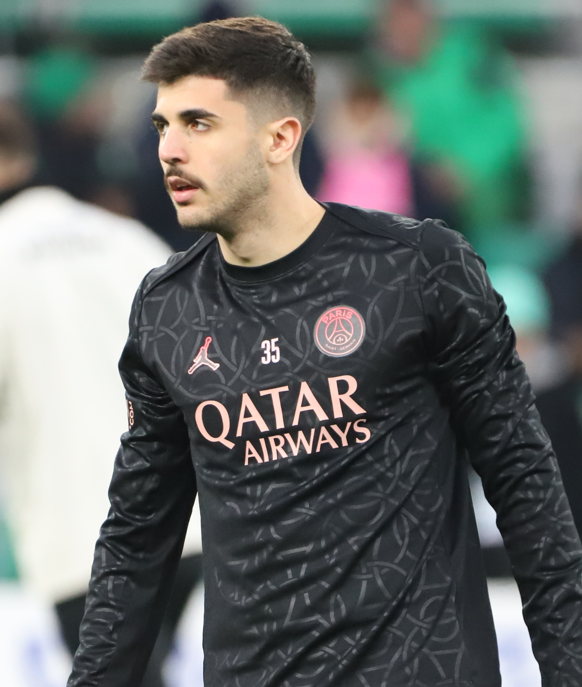
- Beraldo with Paris Saint-Germain in 2025

Personal information
- Full name: Lucas Lopes Beraldo
- Date of birth: 24 November 2003 (age 22)
- Place of birth: Piracicaba, Brazil
- Height: 1.86 m (6 ft 1 in)
- Positions: Centre-back; defensive midfielder

Team information
- Current team: Paris Saint-Germain
- Number: 4

Youth career
- 2016–2017: União Barbarense
- 2017–2019: XV de Piracicaba
- 2020–2022: São Paulo

Senior career*
Years	Team	Apps	(Gls)
2022–2023	São Paulo	36	(1)
2024–	Paris Saint-Germain	67	(5)

International career^{‡}
2022	Brazil U20	2	(0)
2024–	Brazil	5	(0)
- * Club domestic league appearances and goals as of 21:19, 7 November 2026 (UTC) ‡ National team caps and goals as of 23:16, 14 October 2025 (UTC)

Lucas Lopes Beraldo (Brazilian Portuguese: [ˈlukaz beˈʁawdu]; born 24 November 2003) is a Brazilian professional footballer who plays as a centre-back or defensive midfielder for Ligue 1 club Paris Saint-Germain and the Brazil national team.

== Club career ==
=== São Paulo ===
On 26 May 2022, Beraldo made his professional debut with São Paulo in a 1–0 Copa Sudamericana win over Peruvian club Ayacucho. On 24 September 2023, he won his first trophy with the club, the Copa do Brasil.

=== Paris Saint-Germain ===
On 1 January 2024, Beraldo signed for Ligue 1 club Paris Saint-Germain for a reported fee of 20 million euros, signing a contract until June 2028. Two days later, he made his debut as a substitute in a 2–0 win over Toulouse in the Trophée des Champions, winning his first trophy with the club. On 13 March 2024, he scored his first PSG goal in a 3–1 win over Nice in the Coupe de France quarter-finals. His first goal in Ligue 1 came in a 4–1 victory over Lyon on 21 April 2024.

In the 2025–26 season, Beraldo won both the Ligue 1 title and the UEFA Champions League, the latter after a 4–3 penalty shootout victory over Arsenal in the final. He scored what proved to be the decisive 5th penalty for PSG before Arsenal's Gabriel missed to win PSG the trophy.

== International career ==
=== Youth career ===
Beraldo is a Brazil youth international. He was a part of the under-20 team that won the 2022 Torneio Internacional Sub-20 do Espírito Santo.

=== Senior career ===
On 1 March 2024, Beraldo was called up to the senior team for the first time for friendly matches against England and Spain. He debuted on 23 March 2024 in the former match.

== Personal life ==
Beraldo is son of the former football centre-back André Beraldo.

== Career statistics ==
=== Club ===
As of match played 7 November 2026

Appearances and goals by club, season, and competition
Club	Season	League			National cup		Continental		Other		Total	
Club	Season	Division	Apps	Goals	Apps	Goals	Apps	Goals	Apps	Goals	Apps	Goals
São Paulo	2022	Série A	3	0	0	0	1 (Note: Appearance(s) in Copa Sudamericana)	0	—		4	0
São Paulo	2023	Série A	24	1	8	0	7	0	9 (Note: Appearances in Campeonato Paulista)	0	48	1
São Paulo	Total		27	1	8	0	8	0	9	0	52	1
Paris Saint-Germain	2023–24	Ligue 1	13	1	5	1	5 (Note: Appearances in UEFA Champions League)	0	1 (Note: Appearance in Trophée des Champions)	0	24	2
Paris Saint-Germain	2024–25	Ligue 1	25	1	4	0	4	0	5 (Note: Appearances in FIFA Club World Cup)	0	38	1
Paris Saint-Germain	2025–26	Ligue 1	21	2	2	0	3	0	0	0	25	2
Paris Saint-Germain	2026–27	Ligue 1	8	1	0	0	3	0	2 (Note: One appearance in UEFA Super Cup, one appearance in Trophée des Champions)	0	13	1
Paris Saint-Germain	Total		67	5	11	1	15	0	8	0	101	6
Career total			94	6	19	1	23	0	17	0	153	7

=== International ===
As of match played 14 October 2025

Appearances and goals by national team and year
National team	Year	Apps	Goals
Brazil	2024	3	0
Brazil	2025	2	0
Total		5	0

== Honours ==
São Paulo

- Copa do Brasil: 2023

Paris Saint-Germain

- Ligue 1: 2023–24, 2024–25, 2025–26
- Coupe de France: 2023–24, 2024–25
- Trophée des Champions: 2023, 2024, 2025
- UEFA Champions League: 2024–25, 2025–26
- UEFA Super Cup: 2025, 2026
- FIFA Intercontinental Cup: 2025
- FIFA Club World Cup runner-up: 2025

Brazil U20

- Torneio Internacional do Espírito Santo: 2022

Individual

- Troféu Mesa Redonda Team of the Year: 2023

== See also ==
- List of Paris Saint-Germain FC players
