= Quentin Ndjantou =

French footballer (born 2007)

Personal information
- Full name: Quentin Ndjantou Mbitcha
- Date of birth: 23 July 2007 (age 19)
- Place of birth: Arpajon, Essonne, France
- Height: 1.82 m (6 ft 0 in)
- Positions: Forward; left winger; attacking midfielder

Team information
- Current team: Paris Saint-Germain
- Number: 47

Youth career
- 2013–2014: RC Arpajonnais
- 2014–2019: Paris FC
- 2019–2020: US Villejuif
- 2020–2025: Paris Saint-Germain

Senior career*
Years	Team	Apps	(Gls)
2025–	Paris Saint-Germain	13	(1)

International career^{‡}
2022–2023	France U16	14	(3)
2024	France U17	3	(0)
2025	France U18	3	(0)
2025–	France U19	2	(1)
- * Club domestic league appearances and goals as of 22:00, 7 November 2026 (UTC) ‡ National team caps and goals as of 23:22, 27 September 2025 (UTC)

Quentin Ndjantou Mbitcha (born 23 July 2007) is a French professional footballer who plays as a forward, left winger, and attacking midfielder for Ligue 1 club Paris Saint-Germain.

== Early life ==
Quentin Ndjantou Mbitcha was born on 23 July 2007 in Arpajon, Essonne.

== Club career ==
After coming through RC Arpajonnais, Paris FC, and US Villejuif, Ndjantou joined the youth ranks of Paris Saint-Germain (PSG) in 2020. With the club's under-19 squad, he won consecutive Championnat National U19 titles in 2024 and 2025. On 28 July 2025, Ndjantou signed his first professional contract with PSG, a deal until 30 June 2028. On 17 September 2025, he scored a hat-trick in a 5–1 UEFA Youth League win over Atalanta.

On 27 September 2025, Ndjantou made his professional debut for Paris Saint-Germain in a 2–0 Ligue 1 win over Auxerre. On 1 October, he made his UEFA Champions League debut as a substitute in a 2–1 win away to Barcelona. He made his first Champions League start in a 5–3 win over Tottenham Hotspur on 26 November, contributing an assist. Later that year, on 13 December, he scored his first goal for the club in a 3–2 away win over Metz.

== International career ==
Ndjantou is a France youth international, making his debut for the under-16s in 2022. In September 2025, he was selected for the 2025 FIFA U-20 World Cup, but was not released by Paris Saint-Germain after being called up to the first team.

== Style of play ==
Ndjantou can play as a forward, left winger, and attacking midfielder. Originally a wide player, he developed into a versatile centre-forward in 2025, noted for his mobility, intelligent movement, ability to drop deep and link play, and efficiency in front of goal.

== Personal life ==
Born in France, Ndjantou is of Cameroonian descent.

== Career statistics ==
As of match played 7 November 2026

Appearances and goals by club, season and competition
Club	Season	League			Coupe de France		Europe		Other		Total	
Club	Season	Division	Apps	Goals	Apps	Goals	Apps	Goals	Apps	Goals	Apps	Goals
Paris Saint-Germain	2025–26	Ligue 1	10	1	1	0	3 (Note: Appearances in UEFA Champions League)	0	1 (Note: Appearance in FIFA Intercontinental Cup)	0	15	1
Paris Saint-Germain	2026–27	Ligue 1	3	0	0	0	1	0	0	0	4	0
Career total			13	1	1	0	4	0	1	0	19	1

== Honours ==
Paris Saint-Germain U19

- Championnat National U19: 2023–24, 2024–25

Paris Saint-Germain

- Ligue 1: 2025–26
- UEFA Champions League: 2025–26
- UEFA Super Cup: 2026
- FIFA Intercontinental Cup: 2025
