= Renato Marin =

Brazil-born Italian footballer (born 2006)

Personal information
- Full name: Renato Bellucci Marin
- Date of birth: 10 July 2006 (age 20)
- Place of birth: São Paulo, Brazil
- Height: 1.90 m (6 ft 3 in)
- Position: Goalkeeper

Team information
- Current team: Nacional (on loan from Paris Saint-Germain)
- Number: 1

Youth career
- 2017: Palmeiras
- 2018–2019: São Paulo
- 2020–2024: Roma

Senior career*
Years	Team	Apps	(Gls)
2024–2025	Roma	0	(0)
2025–	Paris Saint-Germain	2	(0)
2026–	→ Nacional (loan)	10	(0)

International career^{‡}
2023–2024	Italy U19	6	(0)
- * Club domestic league appearances and goals as of 21:00, 1 November 2026 (UTC) ‡ National team caps and goals as of 19 November 2024

Renato Bellucci Marin (born 10 July 2006) is a professional footballer who plays as a goalkeeper for Primeira Liga club Nacional, on loan from Ligue 1 club Paris Saint-Germain. Born in Brazil, he represents Italy at the youth international level.

== Early life ==
Marin was born on 10 July 2006, in São Paulo, Brazil, where he grew up. He began his career in the youth sector of Palmeiras and later played for São Paulo, where he was the under-13 state champion. In 2020, after the pandemic, his family decided to move to Italy, and had made contact with Serie A side Roma, who were immediately happy to offer him a place in youth academy.

== Club career ==
Marin joined the youth academy of Italian Serie A club side Roma at the age of fourteen and helped the under-17 team win the league title. In 2022, he was promoted to the club's under-19 team and started training with the first team. On 26 September 2024, he was for the first time named on a matchday squad list for the Roma first team during a 1–1 away draw with Atalanta in the league.

On 12 February 2025, Marin rejected Roma's new contract renewal offer. On 17 July 2025, he signed with Ligue 1 club Paris Saint-Germain on a contract until 2030. He made his debut for the club in a 4–0 Coupe de France victory over Fontenay on 20 December 2025.

On 6 July 2026, Marin was loaned out to Primeira Liga club Nacional for the season.

== International career ==
Marin was born in Brazil and holds both Italian and Brazilian citizenship, he is eligible for both the Italian and Brazilian national teams. In 2023, he was called up for the first time for Italy U19.

== Career statistics ==
As of match played 1 November 2026

Appearances and goals by club, season and competition
Club	Season	League			National cup (Note: Includes Coupe de France)		Europe		Other		Total	
Club	Season	Division	Apps	Goals	Apps	Goals	Apps	Goals	Apps	Goals	Apps	Goals
Roma	2024–25	Serie A	0	0	0	0	0	0	—		0	0
Paris Saint-Germain	2025–26	Ligue 1	2	0	1	0	0	0	0	0	3	0
Nacional (loan)	2026–27	Primeira Liga	10	0	0	0	—		—		10	0
Career total			12	0	1	0	0	0	0	0	13	0

== Honours ==
Paris Saint-Germain

- Ligue 1: 2025–26
- Trophée des Champions: 2025
- UEFA Champions League: 2025–26
- UEFA Super Cup: 2025
- FIFA Intercontinental Cup: 2025
