= Illia Zabarnyi =

Ukrainian footballer (born 2002)

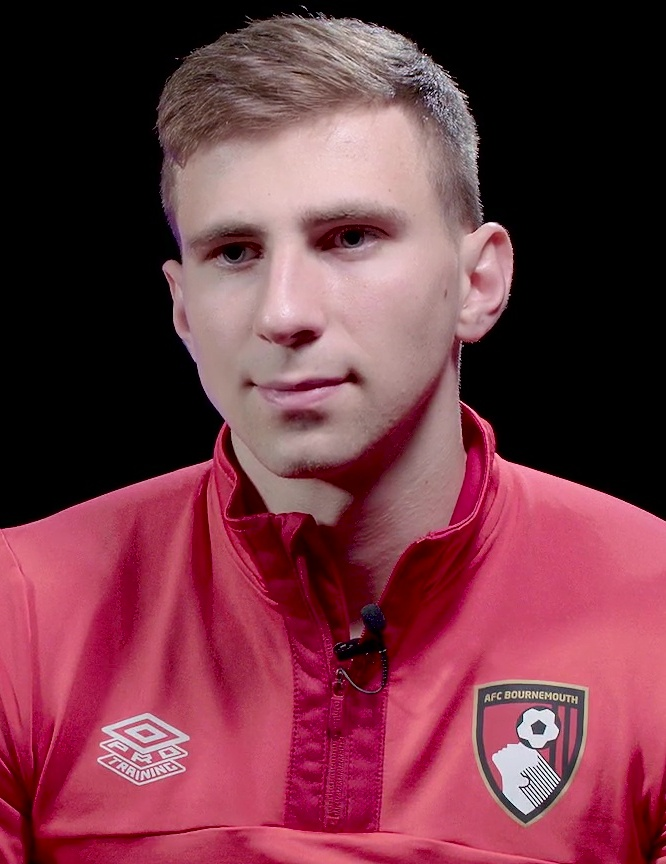
- Zabarnyi with Bournemouth in 2023

Personal information
- Full name: Illia Borysovych Zabarnyi
- Date of birth: 1 September 2002 (age 24)
- Place of birth: Kyiv, Ukraine
- Height: 1.89 m (6 ft 2 in)
- Position: Centre-back

Team information
- Current team: Paris Saint-Germain
- Number: 6

Youth career
- 2015–2019: Dynamo Kyiv

Senior career*
Years	Team	Apps	(Gls)
2019–2023	Dynamo Kyiv	50	(1)
2023–2025	Bournemouth	78	(1)
2025–	Paris Saint-Germain	34	(3)

International career^{‡}
2017	Ukraine U15	2	(0)
2017–2018	Ukraine U16	12	(0)
2018–2019	Ukraine U17	14	(2)
2020	Ukraine U21	2	(1)
2020–	Ukraine	63	(3)
- * Club domestic league appearances and goals as of 21:16, 21 November 2026 (UTC) ‡ National team caps and goals as of 18 November 2026

Illia Borysovych Zabarnyi (also spelled Illya Zabarnyi; Ukrainian: Ілля Борисович Забарний; born 1 September 2002) is a Ukrainian professional footballer who plays as a centre-back for Ligue 1 club Paris Saint-Germain and the Ukraine national team.

== Club career ==
=== Dynamo Kyiv ===
Zabarnyi is a product of the Dynamo Kyiv youth sportive school from his native city Kyiv. His first trainers were Serhiy Bezhenar and Artem Yashkin. He played for Dynamo Kyiv in the Ukrainian Premier League Reserves before being promoted to the senior team in July 2019. Zabarnyi made Ukrainian Premier League debut on 11 September 2020 in a draw against Desna Chernihiv.

=== Bournemouth ===
On 31 January 2023, Zabarnyi signed a five-and-a-half-year contract with Premier League club Bournemouth. He made his debut for the club on 4 April 2023, in a 2–0 defeat to Brighton & Hove Albion. His first goal for the club came on 13 March 2024, in a 4–3 win against Luton Town.

On 21 July 2024, he extended his contract with Bournemouth for another five years until 2029. On 22 February 2025, Zabarnyi was shown a straight red card for the dangerous tackle he made on Rayan Aït-Nouri after the referee Michael Salisbury viewed the VAR monitor. In his absence, Bournemouth would suffer a 1–0 home defeat to Wolverhampton Wanderers.

=== Paris Saint-Germain ===
On 12 August 2025, Zabarnyi made a permanent move to reigning European champions Paris Saint-Germain on a five-year deal, becoming the club's first-ever Ukrainian player. He made his debut for the club on 17 August 2025, in a 1–0 win against Nantes. He scored his first goal for the club on 27 September 2025, in a 2–0 win against Auxerre. In his first season in Paris, Zabarnyi won 4 titles, including the UEFA Champions League.

== International career ==
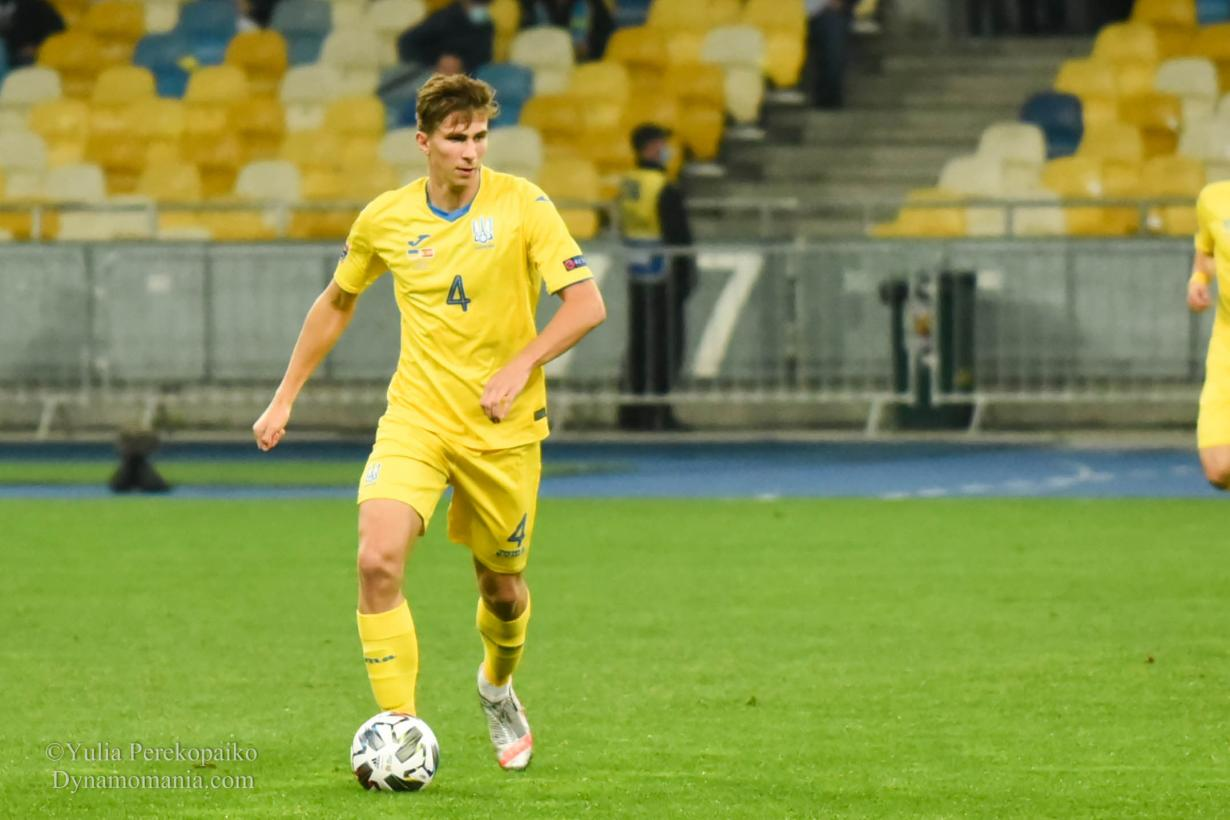
Zabarnyi playing for Ukraine in 2020

Zabarnyi represented Ukraine at under-15, under-16, under-17 and under-21 levels, for a total of 30 caps.

On 7 October 2020, Zabarnyi debuted for the Ukraine national team in a friendly match against France.

At UEFA Euro 2020, he was a part of the Ukrainian team that reached the quarter-finals of the competition for the first time.

In May 2024, Zabarnyi was called up to represent Ukraine at UEFA Euro 2024.

== Personal life ==
Zabarnyi married his long-time girlfriend, Angelina Zabarna in 2023.

== Career statistics ==
=== Club ===
As of match played 21 November 2026

Appearances and goals by club, season and competition
Club	Season	League			National cup (Note: Includes Ukrainian Cup, FA Cup, Coupe de France)		League cup (Note: Includes EFL Cup)		Europe		Other		Total	
Club	Season	Division	Apps	Goals	Apps	Goals	Apps	Goals	Apps	Goals	Apps	Goals	Apps	Goals
Dynamo Kyiv	2020–21	Ukrainian Premier League	21	1	2	0	—		13 (Note: Nine appearances in UEFA Champions League, four appearances in UEFA Europa League)	0	0	0	36	1
Dynamo Kyiv	2021–22	Ukrainian Premier League	15	0	1	0	—		6 (Note: Appearances in UEFA Champions League)	0	1 (Note: Appearance in Ukrainian Super Cup)	0	23	0
Dynamo Kyiv	2022–23	Ukrainian Premier League	14	0	0	0	—		11 (Note: Six appearances in UEFA Champions League, five appearances in UEFA Europa League)	0	1	0	26	0
Dynamo Kyiv	Total		50	1	3	0	—		30	0	2	0	85	1
Bournemouth	2022–23	Premier League	5	0	—		—		—		—		5	0
Bournemouth	2023–24	Premier League	37	1	3	0	2	0	—		—		42	1
Bournemouth	2024–25	Premier League	36	0	3	0	0	0	—		—		39	0
Bournemouth	Total		78	1	6	0	2	0	—		—		86	1
Paris Saint-Germain	2025–26	Ligue 1	28	1	2	0	—		7	0	0	0	37	1
Paris Saint-Germain	2026–27	Ligue 1	6	2	0	0	—		3	0	1 (Note: Appearance in Trophée des Champions)	0	10	2
Paris Saint-Germain	Total		34	3	2	0	—		10	0	1	0	47	3
Career total			162	5	11	0	2	0	40	0	3	0	218	5

=== International ===
As of match played 17 November 2026

Appearances and goals by national team and year
National team	Year	Apps	Goals
Ukraine	2020	4	0
Ukraine	2021	14	0
Ukraine	2022	6	0
Ukraine	2023	8	1
Ukraine	2024	13	0
Ukraine	2025	10	2
Ukraine	2026	8	0
Total		63	3

Scores and results list Ukraine's goal tally first, score column indicates score after each Zabarnyi goal.

List of international goals scored by Illia Zabarnyi
No.	Date	Venue	Cap	Opponent	Score	Result	Competition
1	16 June 2023	Toše Proeski Arena, Skopje, North Macedonia	26	North Macedonia	1–2	3–2	UEFA Euro 2024 qualifying
2	20 March 2025	Nueva Condomina, Murcia, Spain	46	Belgium	3–1	3–1	2024–25 UEFA Nations League promotion/relegation play-offs
3	7 June 2025	BMO Field, Toronto, Canada	48	Canada	1–4	2–4	2025 Canadian Shield

== Honours ==
Dynamo Kyiv

- Ukrainian Premier League: 2020–21
- Ukrainian Cup: 2020–21
- Ukrainian Super Cup: 2020

Paris Saint-Germain

- Ligue 1: 2025–26
- Trophée des Champions: 2025
- UEFA Champions League: 2025–26
- UEFA Super Cup: 2026
- FIFA Intercontinental Cup: 2025

Individual

- Golden talent of Ukraine: 2020 (U-19), 2021 (U-19)
- Ukrainian Premier League player of the Month: April 2021
- Bournemouth Supporters' Player of the Season: 2023–24
