= Senny Mayulu =

French footballer (born 2006)

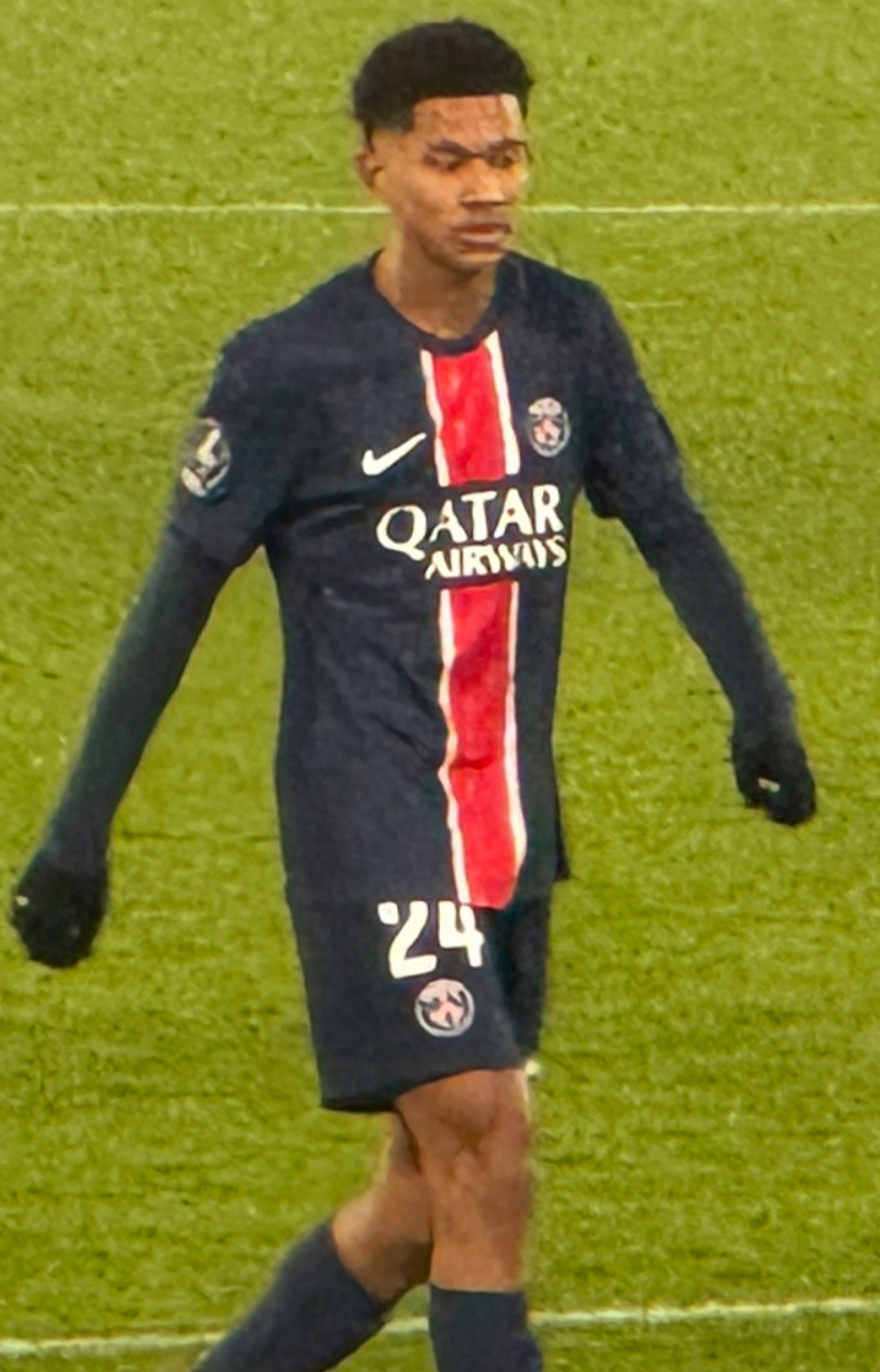
- Mayulu playing for Paris Saint-Germain in 2025

Personal information
- Full name: Senny Nsona Mayulu
- Date of birth: 17 May 2006 (age 20)
- Place of birth: Le Blanc-Mesnil, France
- Height: 1.83 m (6 ft 0 in)
- Position: Midfielder

Team information
- Current team: Paris Saint-Germain
- Number: 24

Youth career
- 2012–2014: Saint-Denis US
- 2014–2020: AF Épinay-sur-Seine
- 2020–2024: Paris Saint-Germain

Senior career*
Years	Team	Apps	(Gls)
2024–	Paris Saint-Germain	59	(9)

International career^{‡}
2023	France U18	5	(0)
2024	France U19	10	(2)
2024–2025	France U20	6	(1)
2025–	France U21	4	(0)
2026–	France	1	(0)
Medal record
Men's football
Representing France
UEFA European Under-19 Championship
Runner-up	2024 Northern Ireland
- * Club domestic league appearances and goals as of 17:50, 21 November 2026 (UTC) ‡ National team caps and goals as of 21:40, 12 November 2026 (UTC)

Senny Nsona Mayulu (born 17 May 2006) is a French professional footballer who plays as a midfielder for Ligue 1 club Paris Saint-Germain and the France national team.

== Club career ==
On 25 June 2021, Mayulu signed a new three-year youth contract with Paris Saint-Germain (PSG). On 25 October 2023, he scored the winning goal in a 1–0 UEFA Youth League win over the AC Milan under-19s, a goal that was described by Le Parisien as "superb". Less than a month later on 14 November, he was called up by senior head coach Luis Enrique for his first training session with the first team. In December 2023, L'Équipe described Mayulu as one of the "most promising" players in the Paris Saint-Germain Youth Academy.

On 7 January 2024, Mayulu made his professional debut for PSG as a substitute in a 9–0 Coupe de France win over Revel in the round of 64. Five days later, PSG announced that he would integrate the first team as part of the "elite group", joining teammates Ethan Mbappé and Warren Zaïre-Emery. In the round of 32 of the Coupe de France on 20 January, Mayulu scored his first professional goal, a lob over the goalkeeper in a 4–1 victory against Orléans. On 18 March, he made his Ligue 1 debut as a substitute in a 6–2 win over Montpellier. On 6 April, he started his first senior match against Clermont; he went on to score a goal that was later disallowed by VAR due to a foul by his teammate in the build-up. On 24 April, Mayulu made his second start for PSG in a match against Lorient, providing his first career assist for Ousmane Dembélé's opening goal in a 4–1 victory. He signed his first professional contract on 20 May, a deal until 30 June 2027.

On 19 October 2024, Mayulu scored the opening goal of a 4–2 win over Strasbourg, his first in Ligue 1. On 19 February 2025, he scored his first UEFA Champions League goal in a 7–0 win over Brest in the knockout round play-offs. On 31 May 2025, Mayulu came off the bench to score the final goal in the 2025 UEFA Champions League final, a 5–0 victory over Inter Milan, to become at 19 years and 14 days the youngest Frenchman to score in a UEFA club competition final, and the third-youngest player, behind Patrick Kluivert and Brian Kidd, ever to score in a Champions League final. The following month, on 15 June, Mayulu scored PSG’s third goal in a 4–0 win against Atlético Madrid in the 2025 FIFA Club World Cup, to become at 19 years and 28 days the youngest French player to score in the Club World Cup, surpassing the previous record of 20 years and 297 days set by Nicolas Anelka in the 2000 edition.

== International career ==
Mayulu has represented France at youth international level. He made his debut for the under-18s in 2023, winning the Tournoi de Limoges.

On 11 November 2026, Mayulu received his first call-up to the senior France national team under head coach Zinedine Zidane for UEFA Nations League matches against Italy and Turkey.

== Personal life ==
Born in France, Mayulu is of DR Congolese descent. His older brother Fally is also a professional footballer, while his younger brother Emany currently plays for Lyon's youth team.

== Career statistics ==
=== Club ===
As of match played 21 November 2026

Appearances and goals by club, season and competition
Club	Season	League			Coupe de France		Europe		Other		Total	
Club	Season	Division	Apps	Goals	Apps	Goals	Apps	Goals	Apps	Goals	Apps	Goals
Paris Saint-Germain	2023–24	Ligue 1	8	0	2	1	0	0	0	0	10	1
Paris Saint-Germain	2024–25	Ligue 1	20	2	4	1	4 (Note: Appearances in UEFA Champions League)	2	6 (Note: One appearance in Trophée des Champions, five appearances and one goal in FIFA Club World Cup)	1	34	6
Paris Saint-Germain	2025–26	Ligue 1	26	3	2	0	11	2	2 (Note: One appearance in FIFA Intercontinental Cup, one appearance in Trophée des Champions)	0	41	5
Paris Saint-Germain	2026–27	Ligue 1	5	3	0	0	3	1	2 (Note: One appearance in UEFA Super Cup, one appearance in Trophée des Champions)	0	10	4
Career total			59	9	8	2	18	5	10	1	94	16

=== International ===
As of match played 12 November 2026

Appearances and goals by national team and year
National team	Year	Apps	Goals
France	2026	1	0
Total		1	0

== Honours ==
Paris Saint-Germain U19

- Championnat National U19: 2023–24

Paris Saint-Germain

- Ligue 1: 2023–24, 2024–25, 2025–26
- Coupe de France: 2023–24, 2024–25
- Trophée des Champions: 2024, 2025
- UEFA Champions League: 2024–25, 2025–26
- UEFA Super Cup: 2026
- FIFA Intercontinental Cup: 2025
- FIFA Club World Cup runner-up: 2025

France U18

- Lafarge Foot Avenir: 2023

France U19

- UEFA European Under-19 Championship runner-up: 2024

Individual

- Titi d'Or: 2023
