= 2027 =

2027 in various calendars
- Gregorian calendar: 2027; MMXXVII
- Ab urbe condita: 2780
- Armenian calendar: 1476; ԹՎ ՌՆՀԶ
- Assyrian calendar: 6777
- Baháʼí calendar: 183–184
- Balinese saka calendar: 1948–1949
- Bengali calendar: 1433–1434
- Berber calendar: 2977
- British Regnal year: N/A
- Buddhist calendar: 2571
- Burmese calendar: 1389
- Byzantine calendar: 7535–7536
- Chinese calendar: 丙午年 (Fire Horse); 4724 or 4517 — to — 丁未年 (Fire Goat); 4725 or 4518
- Coptic calendar: 1743–1744
- Discordian calendar: 3193
- Ethiopian calendar: 2019–2020
- Hebrew calendar: 5787–5788
- Hindu calendars
- Vikram Samvat: 2083–2084
- Shaka Samvat: 1948–1949
- Kali Yuga: 5127–5128
- Holocene calendar: 12027
- Igbo calendar: 1027–1028
- Iranian calendar: 1405–1406
- Islamic calendar: 1448–1449
- Japanese calendar: Reiwa 9 (令和９年)
- Javanese calendar: 1960–1961
- Juche calendar: 116
- Julian calendar: Gregorian minus 13 days
- Korean calendar: 4360
- Minguo calendar: ROC 116 民國116年
- Nanakshahi calendar: 559
- Thai solar calendar: 2570
- Tibetan calendar: མེ་ཕོ་རྟ་ལོ་ (male Fire-Horse); 2153 or 1772 or 1000 — to — མེ་མོ་ལུག་ལོ་ (female Fire-Sheep); 2154 or 1773 or 1001
- Unix time: 1798761600 – 1830297599

2027 (MMXXVII) is the upcoming year, which will be a common year starting on Friday of the Gregorian calendar, the 2027th year of the Common Era (CE) and Anno Domini (AD) designations, the 27th year of the 3rd millennium and the 21st century, and the 8th year of the 2020s decade.

== Predicted and scheduled events ==
- January 13–31 – The 2027 World Men's Handball Championship will be held in Germany, with matches in Cologne, Hanover, Kiel, Magdeburg, Munich and Stuttgart. The final is scheduled for Cologne on January 31.
- January 15–25 – The 2027 Winter World University Games will be held in Changchun, China. The competition is organized by the International University Sports Federation (FISU).
- January 16 – The 2027 Nigerian general election is scheduled to be held.
- January 20–February 7 – The 2027 African Games are scheduled to be held in Cairo, Egypt.
- January 30 – The 2027 German presidential election is scheduled to be held by the Federal Convention to elect the President of Germany.
- February 11 – The 2027 South Sudanese general election is scheduled to be held, the first since the country's independence in 2011.
- February 14 – Super Bowl LXI will be held at SoFi Stadium in Inglewood, California, United States.
- February 21 – The 2027 NBA All-Star Game will be played at Mortgage Matchup Center in Phoenix, Arizona, United States.
- March 7 – If not triggered earlier, the next Estonian parliamentary election must be held no later than this date.
- April 18
  - The 2027 Finnish parliamentary election is scheduled to be held.
  - The 2027 French presidential election is scheduled to be held.
- May 11–15 – The 71st Eurovision Song Contest will be held at Arena Burgas in Burgas, Bulgaria. The first semi-final is scheduled for May 11, the second semi-final for May 13, and the grand final for May 15.
- May 14–30 – The 2027 IIHF World Championship will be held in Düsseldorf and Mannheim, Germany, with the final round in Düsseldorf. An opening game between Germany and Switzerland is scheduled for May 13 at Veltins-Arena in Gelsenkirchen.
- May 15–August 15 – Expo 2027 will be held in Belgrade, Serbia, as a Specialised Expo under the theme Play for Humanity: Sport and Music for All.
- May 26 – The 2027 UEFA Europa League final is scheduled to be played in Frankfurt, Germany.
- June 1 – The Trial of Nicolas Maduro is scheduled to be held in New York City.
- June 5 – The 2027 UEFA Champions League final is scheduled to be played at the Metropolitano Stadium in Madrid, Spain.
- June 6 – The 2027 Mexican legislative election is scheduled to be held.
- June 16–27 – The 2027 European Games will be held in Istanbul, Turkey. The programme is expected to comprise 26 sports and disciplines.
- June 19–July 17 – The 2027 Africa Cup of Nations will be jointly hosted by Kenya, Tanzania and Uganda. The opening match is scheduled for June 19 and the final for July 17. It will be the first AFCON tournament jointly hosted by three countries.
- June 24–July 25 – The 2027 FIFA Women's World Cup will be held in Brazil. It will be the first FIFA Women's World Cup held in South America. The Maracanã Stadium in Rio de Janeiro is scheduled to host both the opening match and the final.
- July 23–August 8 – The 2027 Pan American Games will be held in Lima, Peru. More than 6,900 athletes from 41 countries are expected to compete in 38 sports; the opening ceremony is scheduled for July 23.
- July 24–August 8 – The 2027 Pacific Games are scheduled to be held in Tahiti, French Polynesia.
- July 25 – If not triggered earlier, the next Greek parliamentary election must be held no later than this date.
- August 1–12 – The 2027 Summer World University Games will be held in Chungcheong Province, South Korea. The Games will be jointly organized across the region's participating cities and provinces.
- August 3–8 – World Youth Day 2027 will be held in Seoul, South Korea. The gathering will bring young people from around the world together with Pope Leo XIV.
- August 10 – The 2027 Kenyan general election is scheduled to take place.
- August 27–September 12 – The 2027 FIBA Basketball World Cup will be held in Doha, Qatar. The tournament will feature 32 national teams and 92 games across four arenas.
- September 11
  - The 2027 Palestinian legislative election is scheduled to be held.
  - The 2027 Palestinian presidential election is scheduled to be held.
- September 18–September 29 – The 2027 Southeast Asian Games will be held in Kuala Lumpur, Sarawak, Penang, and Johor, Malaysia.
- September 28 – If not triggered earlier, the next Slovak parliamentary election must be held no later than this date.
- October 1–November 13 – The 2027 Rugby World Cup will be held in Australia. The expanded tournament will feature 24 teams, with the opening match in Perth and the final in Sydney.
- October 2–November 21 – The 2027 Cricket World Cup will be held in South Africa, Zimbabwe and Namibia. The tournament is scheduled to comprise 14 teams and 54 matches.
- October 16–24 – The 2027 Special Olympics World Summer Games will be held in Santiago, Chile.
- October 24 – The 2027 Argentine general election is scheduled to be held.
- October 27–November 4 – The 2027 Commonwealth Youth Games will be held in Malta.
- November 11 – If not triggered earlier, the next Polish parliamentary election must be held no later than this date.
- December 22 – If not triggered earlier, the 2027 Italian general election must be held no later than this date.
- December 23–January 21 – The 2027 AFC Asian Cup will be held in Saudi Arabia, across Riyadh, Jeddah and Al Khobar. It will be the 19th edition of the AFC Asian Cup.

=== Date unknown ===
- Mid-2027 – Artemis III, the third mission of the Artemis program, is scheduled to launch four astronauts aboard Orion and the Space Launch System from the Kennedy Space Center. Under NASA's revised Artemis architecture, Artemis III will be a crewed low Earth orbit demonstration mission designed to test rendezvous and docking operations involving commercial human-landing-system hardware and other systems needed for the subsequent lunar landing mission. The first Artemis crewed lunar landing is now planned for Artemis IV in 2028.
- The first Olympic Esports Games will be held in Saudi Arabia in 2027. The inaugural event is part of the International Olympic Committee's long-term partnership with the Saudi Olympic and Paralympic Committee.
- The 2027 Arab Games will be held in Riyadh, Saudi Arabia.
