= Albino Akol Atak Mayom =

South Sudanese politician and government official

Hon. Albino (Ayok) Akol Atak Mayom

1. Minister of Humanitarian Affairs and Disaster Management 2023 - 2026; 2. National MP 2021 - 2026; 3. Deputy Chairperson of its specialized committee on Agriculture and food security in the NLA 2021 - 2023; 4. Secretary General of the African National Congress (ANC) party; 5. Secretary General others political parties (OPP); 6. Secretary General Kuac Ayok Community Worldwide; 7. Administrator and Inspector University of Bahr El Ghazal 2007 - 2011; 8. Director/office manager in the office of the Deputy Minister of higher; education, science & technology, 2011-2013: 9. Director /office manager, Office of the Minister, Ministry of Lands, Housing, and Urban Development 2013 - 2021
- In office 2023–2026
- President: Salva Kiir
- Preceded by: Peter Mayen Majongdit
- Succeeded by: Peter Mayen Majongdit

Personal details
- Born: 1st January, 1979 South Sudan Warrap State, Gogrial West County, Kuac South Payam, Dong Mabior Boma, Yieth-liet/Kharic
- Party: African National Congress
- Occupation: Politician
- Profession: Government official

Albino Akol Atak Mayom is a South Sudanese politician and government official. He has served as the minister of humanitarian affairs and disaster management in the Government of South Sudan since 2023.

== Career ==
Albino (Ayok) Akol Atak Mayom is a South Sudanese economist and politician who served as Minister of Humanitarian Affairs and Disaster Management from 2023 to 2026. He was a member of the Transitional National Legislative Assembly from 2021 to 2026 and served as deputy chairperson of its Specialized Committee on Agriculture and Food Security from 2021 to 2023. He is secretary general of African National Congress (ANC), the Other Political Parties (OPP), and the Kuac Ayok Community Association Worldwide.

=== Early life and education ===
Albino Akol Atak Mayom was born on 1 January 1979 in Kharic/Yieth Liet, Kuac South Payam, Gogrial West County, Warrap State, South Sudan.

His educational journey started earlier in Comboni primary schools at Jebel Aulia and Dar El Salam Mayo in Khartoum State, Sudan, between 1988 and 1996 where he completed his primary education. After completed his primary, he later went to El Ghomia Senior Secondary School in Jebel Aulia, where he studied in science section and completed his Sudan Secondary School Certificate between 1997 and 2000.

From 2000 to 2005, he joined the University, where he pursued economics at the College of Social and Economic Studies at the University of Juba, which was then operating in Khartoum, Sudan. He obtained a Bachelor of Science in Economics. To build his education, in 2006, he completed a diploma in computer sciences at Datom Institute in Khartoum.

He later pursued postgraduate studies at the University of Juba in South Sudan, obtaining a Master of Science in Economics between 2017 and 2019.

=== Beginning his political career ===
He began his political activities while studying at the University of Juba in Khartoum. From 2000 to 2005, he served as Secretary for Political Affairs and was an active member of the African National Front (ANF), a student political organization.

In 2006, he became a founding member of the African National Congress in South Sudan. He served as Deputy Secretary for Membership Affairs from 2006 to 2007 and later promoted to Secretary for Membership Affairs from 2007 to 2009.

From 2009 to 2018, he served as the party’s Secretary for Culture and Information and spokesperson. He also became a member of the ANC Leadership Council in 2009.

In 2018, he was appointed as Secretary-General of the African National Congress Party. His responsibilities have included party administration, political representation, communication, and participation in political consultations.

In addition to that he served as spokesperson for the Other Political Parties (OPP) from 2020 to 2023. In 2023, he became Secretary-General of the OPP, a political grouping of six political parties including the African National Congress.

In these roles, he has participated in political consultations, inter-party engagement, and discussions concerning South Sudan’s transitional governance and electoral process.

Public administration, he began his career in public administration at the University of Bahr el Ghazal, where he served as an administrator and inspector between 2007 and 2011. His work involved administrative and institutional support in Khartoum and Wau.

In 2011, he was appointed into the Ministry of Higher Education, Science and Technology as Director and Office Manager in the Office of the Deputy Minister, serving until 2013.

From 2013 to 2021, he was appointed as Director and Office Manager in the Office of the Minister at the Ministry of Lands, Housing and Urban Development. His responsibilities included administrative coordination, management of official correspondence, scheduling, and communication between the ministerial office, ministry departments, and external stakeholders.

His administrative responsibilities also included supporting institutional processes associated with the development of the National Land Policy and a pilot project involving 50 housing units intended for senior government officials.

In 2021, Akol became a member of the Transitional National Legislative Assembly of South Sudan, representing ANC within the Other Political Parties grouping.

From 2021 to 2023, he served as Deputy Chairperson of the Specialized Committee on Agriculture and Food Security. His responsibilities included legislative review, policy oversight, and parliamentary engagement on agriculture, food security, and related development matters. He remained a member of the assembly until his 22, Sept, 2026 where transitional government was dissolved.

On 31 January 2023, He was appointed Minister of Humanitarian Affairs and Disaster Management in the government of South Sudan.

As minister, he provided political leadership to the ministry responsible for humanitarian affairs and disaster management. His portfolio included government coordination with humanitarian organizations, disaster preparedness, emergency response, and engagement with national and international partners.

During his tenure, South Sudan faced humanitarian challenges involving flooding, displacement, food insecurity, and population movements associated with conflict in the region. The ministry’s work included coordination with government institutions, United Nations agencies, humanitarian organizations, and other partners involved in responding to emergencies and supporting vulnerable populations.

Akol’s ministerial responsibilities included representing the government in humanitarian consultations and participating in discussions on emergency preparedness, disaster risk reduction, humanitarian assistance, and resilience. He served as minister until the government was dissolved on 22 September 2026.

Peace processes and political dialogue; Akol has participated in political consultations and dialogue processes associated with South Sudan’s peace agreements, according to his professional record.

In 2015, he participated in political parties’ consultations and symposiums associated with negotiations leading to the Agreement on the Resolution of the Conflict in South Sudan (ARCSS), which was signed in Addis Ababa, Ethiopia.

2018 revitalized peace agreement; He subsequently participated in the High-Level Revitalization Forum and related political negotiations associated with the 2018 Revitalized Agreement on the Resolution of the Conflict in South Sudan (R-ARCSS), held in Addis Ababa and Khartoum. He was a member of the High-Level Standing Committee supporting implementation of the agreement.

In 2022, he participated in the development and signing of the Roadmap for the Peaceful End of the Transitional Period. He also served on a related high-level committee.

Between 2024 and 2025, he served as a member of the Revitalized Transitional Government of National Unity delegation to the Tumaini Initiative. The initiative involved dialogue on outstanding political and governance issues between the government and groups that had not signed the revitalized peace agreement.

In 2026, he participated in inter-party political dialogue concerning elections and the country’s political future.

He represented OPP in the Leadership Body of the Parties Signatory to the R-ARCSS for Dialogue on Elections-Related Matters. He also served as Deputy Rapporteur in the Inter-Party High-Level Steering Body on the Management of the Political Dialogue on the Way Forward to Elections.

Community leadership; On 30 July 2025, he became Secretary-General of the Kuac Ayok Community Association Worldwide.

The association represents the Kuac Ayok community. His responsibilities in this role include community coordination, representation, and participation in initiatives relating to community development and welfare.

Akol is a South Sudanese national and a Catholic Christian. His place of origin is Kharic/Yieth Liet in Kuac South Payam, Gogrial West County, Warrap State.

He speaks Dinka as his native language and has professional proficiency in English and Arabic.

In April 2024, Mayom met with UNHCR Deputy High Commissioner Kelly T. Clements and Sweden's State Secretary Diana Janse in Juba to discuss humanitarian challenges and international support for displaced people. Later that year, he urged international partners to increase support for humanitarian aid initiatives, warning that millions of South Sudanese faced acute needs due to conflict, flooding, economic challenges and displacement.

In 2025, Mayom oversaw expanded humanitarian relief operations in the Upper Nile region, including the establishment of a fully equipped medical facility that provided free care to more than 500 people affected by conflict and displacement. He also supported voluntary return efforts for refugees, proposing government plans to assist South Sudanese displaced abroad in returning home voluntarily with support for resettlement.

== See also ==
- Government of South Sudan
- Ministry of Humanitarian Affairs and Disaster Management (South Sudan)
- Salva Kiir
- Humanitarian situation in South Sudan
- Politics of South Sudan
