= 2027 South Sudanese general election =

First post-independence national election

- 11 February 2027
- Presidential election
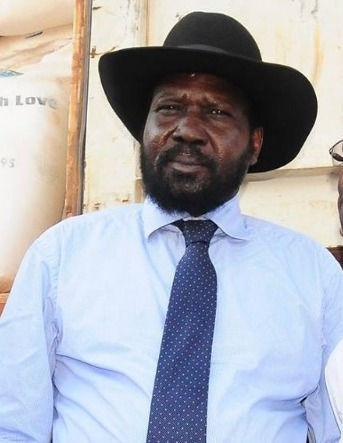

Nominee	Salva Kiir	Peter Mayen
Party	SPLM	People's Liberal Party
Nominee	Bol Gai Deng	Deng Bol Aruei
Party	KDMP	Common People's Alliance
Incumbent President
Salva Kiir
SPLM
- National Legislative Assembly
- All 550 seats in the National Legislative Assembly; 276 seats needed for a majority
Party	Leader	Current seats
SPLM	Salva Kiir	332
SPLM-IO	Riek Machar	128
SSOA	Josephine Joseph Lagu	50
Independents	–	30
Former detainees	–	10
- Council of States
- All 100 seats in the Council of States; 51 seats needed for a majority
Party	Current seats
SPLM	46
SPLM-IO	27
SSOA	10
Independents	9
Vacant	8
Constituencies of South Sudan

General elections are due to be held in South Sudan on 11 February 2027, the first since independence.

Following the independence of South Sudan, the country's initial constitution scheduled national elections to be held by 9 July 2015. Elections have been postponed six times to 2018, 2021, 2023, 2024, 2026, and finally the currently scheduled date in 2027. These delays were caused by a myriad of factors including the outbreak of the South Sudanese Civil War and ensuing peace agreement, inadequate government institutions, and the consolidation of power by longtime president Salva Kiir.

== Background ==
Following the independence of South Sudan, Riek Machar was inaugurated after selection, not by election, as the first vice president to selected President Salva Kiir. In July 2013, the entire cabinet, including Machar, was dismissed by Kiir on the ostensible reason to decrease the size of government. However, Machar said that this was a step towards dictatorship on the part of Kiir and that he would seek to challenge Kiir for the presidency. While civil war ensued, at the end of September 2014 an Intergovernmental Authority on Development-mediated resolution was agreed upon that would lead to the federalisation of the country's governance.

The transitional constitution required the election to be held by 9 July 2015, the date on which the first post-independence presidential term ends. Kiir told the Warrap parliament that a lack of funds to conduct a census and complete the new constitution could result in a delay of the election. This caused doubts as to Kiir's intention to merely hold on to power and was coupled with the dismissal of the governor of Unity Taban Deng Gai on allegation that he would back Machar in replacing Kiir as the SPLM chairperson and therefore the party's candidate for the election, though Gai denied this. Since the coup, John Garang's son, Mabior Garang De-Mabior, also mentioned that as the constitutional convention could not write a permanent constitution of South Sudan, the scheduled 2015 date for the election would not be met.

Additionally, the U.S. envoy for Sudan and South Sudan, Donald E. Booth, held talks with the chairman of the National Elections Commission, Abednego Akok Kacuol, and the chairman of the National Bureau of Statistics, Isaiah Chol Aruai, in order to call for sticking to the allotted date and the provision of funds to complete the necessary prerequisites.

The South Sudan parliament voted in April 2015 to amend the country's transitional 2011 constitution to extend the presidential and parliamentary term until 9 July 2018, with 264 members in favour and a handful opposing it. It was postponed again to 2021 in July 2018. Following the peace agreement that ended the civil war, a transitional period of three years was agreed on, which would be followed by elections in 2023. In 2022, the transitional government and opposition agreed to move it to late 2024. In September 2024, the government ordered the elections to be postponed until 22 December 2026, citing the need to complete institutional processes such the creation of a census and a permanent constitution and the registration of political parties.

In June 2026, the National Elections Commission officially set the election date as 22 December 2026. On 21 September, President Kiir signed a law dissolving the transitional government ahead of the election.

== Electoral system ==
The president of South Sudan is elected via the two-round system. If no candidate obtains over half of valid votes cast, another round must be held within 60 days between the two candidates that obtained the most votes. To be eligible for election, a candidate must be a South Sudanese citizen by birth, be "of sound mind", be 40 years of age or older, be literate, and not have been convicted of a criminal offence involving "fraud, dishonesty, or moral turpitude". They must also obtain signatures from 10,000 voters across at least seven states, with at least 200 voters from each state. The same applies for the election of Governors, except only 5,000 voters from at least half of that state's counties (with at least 100 voters from each county) are required.

The 332 members of the National Legislative Assembly shall be comprised in the following manner:

- 158 elected in single-member constituencies via first-past-the-post voting.
- 110 elected via closed-list proportional representation using the divisor method from women-only lists at the national level.
- 47 elected via closed-list proportional representation using the divisor method at the national level.
- 17 appointed by the elected president.

As such, each voter will be given three ballots (one for their constituency, one of women's party lists, and one of general party lists). To be eligible for proportional representation seats, a list must obtain at least 4% of valid votes.

The members of the Council of States are indirectly elected, with each state's legislative assembly appointing five members and each administrative area's legislative council appointing two members.

State legislative assemblies are elected in a similar manner to the National Legislative Assembly, but without any appointed seats:

- 50% of seats are elected in single-member constituencies via first-past-the-post voting.
- 35% of seats are elected via closed-list proportional representation using the divisor method from women-only lists at the state level.
- 15% of seats are elected via closed-list proportional representation using the divisor method at the state level.

Each candidate (in the case of single-member elections) and party (in the case of party-list elections) is allocated their own electoral symbol, and independent candidates are allowed to stand as long as they have not been a member of a political party for at least three months prior to the election.

== Presidential candidates ==
=== Announced ===
- Sudan People's Liberation Movement (SPLM)
  - Salva Kiir, incumbent president
- People's Liberal Party (PLP)
  - Peter Mayen Majongdit
- Kush Democratic Majority Party (KDMP)
  - Bol Gai Deng
- Common People's Alliance
  - Deng Bol Aruei
