= Daniel Siebert (referee) =

German football referee

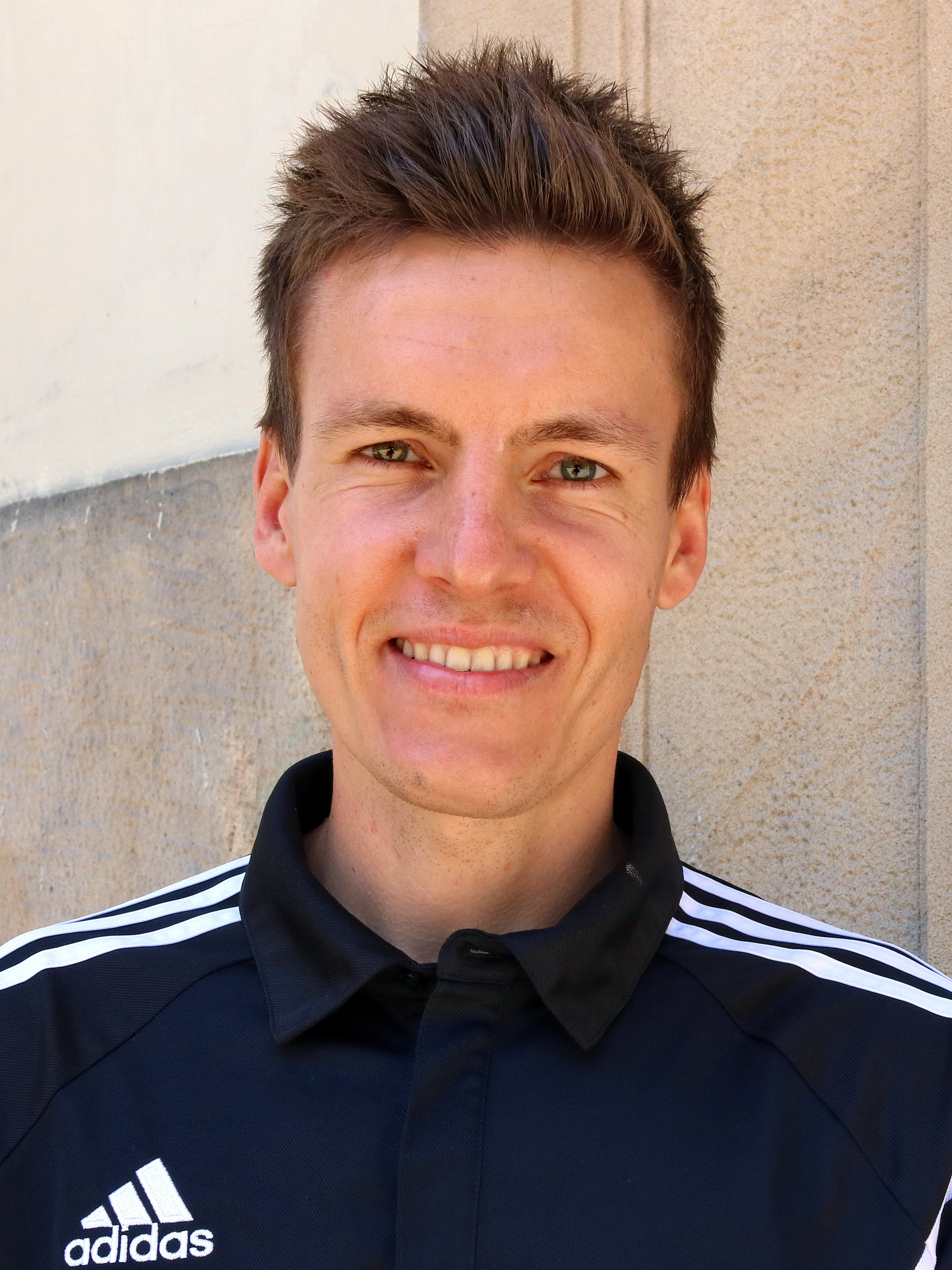
- Siebert in 2018
- Born: 4 May 1984 (age 42); East Berlin, East Germany
- Other occupation: Sports scientist

Domestic
Years	League	Role
2007–	DFB	Referee
2009–	2. Bundesliga	Referee
2012–	Bundesliga	Referee

International
Years	League	Role
2015–	FIFA listed	Referee

Daniel Siebert (born 4 May 1984) is a German football referee who is based in Berlin. He referees for FC Nordost Berlin of the Berlin Football Association. He is a FIFA referee, and is ranked as a UEFA elite category referee.

== Refereeing career ==
Siebert, referee of the club Champions league, has been officiating since 1998. In 2007, he was appointed as a DFB referee. Siebert made his premiere in the 2. Bundesliga in 2009. He was appointed as a Bundesliga referee for the 2012–13 season, and made his first top-flight appearance in the match between Schalke 04 and FC Augsburg on 1 September 2012, issuing three yellow cards.

On 24 October 2014, it was announced Siebert would replace Wolfgang Stark as a FIFA referee in 2015. This made Siebert the youngest of the ten German FIFA referees.

Siebert made his international debut on 29 May 2015 when he officiated the 2015 UEFA European Under-19 Championship qualification match between Portugal and Turkey. The first senior international match Siebert officiated was a friendly match between Luxembourg and Moldova on 9 June 2015.

Siebert has officiated 3 matches during the 2020 European Championship. He oversaw the Group D Scotland–Czech Republic fixture, the Group E Sweden–Slovakia match, and the Round of 16 game between Wales and Denmark.

He whistled 4 matches of the 2021 FIFA Arab Cup such as the final match between Tunisia and Algeria.

On 11 May 2026, UEFA announced Siebert would take charge of 2026 UEFA Champions League final between Paris Saint-Germain and Arsenal on 30 May.

== Personal life ==
Siebert was born in Berlin, where he still lives. He works as a teacher part-time at a sports hotel in Berlin. He is the father of two kids.

Sporting positions (Germany) Daniel Siebert
Preceded by 2025 (Romania) Istvan Kovacs	UEFA Champions League Final Referee; 2026	Succeeded by 2027 To be determined
