= 2026 UEFA Europa League final =

Football match in Istanbul, Turkey

- Match programme cover
- Event: 2025–26 UEFA Europa League
SC Freiburg	Aston Villa
(German Football Association)	(The Football Association)
0	3
- Date: 20 May 2026
- Venue: Beşiktaş Stadium, Istanbul
- Man of the Match: Emiliano Buendía (Aston Villa)
- Referee: François Letexier (France)
- Attendance: 37,324
- Weather: Partly cloudy night 17 °C (63 °F); 82% humidity

The 2026 UEFA Europa League final was the final match of the 2025–26 UEFA Europa League, the 55th season of Europe's secondary club football tournament organised by UEFA, and the 17th season since it was renamed from the UEFA Cup to the UEFA Europa League. It was played at Beşiktaş Stadium in Istanbul, Turkey, on 20 May 2026 between German club SC Freiburg and English club Aston Villa.

Aston Villa won the match 3–0 for their first UEFA Europa League title, their second European title after winning the 1982 European Cup final and their first overall title since winning the 1996 Football League Cup final. As winners, they earned the right to play against the winners of the 2025–26 UEFA Champions League, Paris Saint-Germain, in the 2026 UEFA Super Cup. Since Aston Villa had already qualified to enter the league phase of the 2026–27 UEFA Champions League through their league performance, the league phase spot reserved for the Europa League title holders was vacated and the access list was rebalanced.

== Background ==
Freiburg reached their first ever European final. They were aiming for a first major title. Freiburg's previous best European run was reaching the Europa League round of 16 twice, in 2022–23 and 2023–24.

Aston Villa reached their first UEFA Cup/Europa League final and a third European final, having won the 1982 European Cup final and 1982 European Super Cup. They were seeking a first major trophy since winning the League Cup in 1996, thus discounting them being one of the three winners of the 2001 UEFA Intertoto Cup. This was their best European run across three successive seasons after a 13-year absence, having lost the semi-finals of the 2023–24 UEFA Europa Conference League to eventual winners Olympiacos before elimination in the 2024–25 UEFA Champions League quarter-finals to another eventual winner in Paris Saint-Germain. Their previous furthest run in the UEFA Cup/Europa League was the quarter-finals in 1977–78 and 1997–98. Villa head coach Unai Emery was looking for a record-extending fifth UEFA Cup/Europa League title and the first with a non-Spanish side, having won three with Sevilla (2014, 2015, 2016) and one with Villarreal (2021) sandwiching his defeat with Arsenal in 2019. Their striker Tammy Abraham was aiming to become the 11th player to have won all three major European trophies and the first to have achieved that with three different clubs, having won the 2020–21 UEFA Champions League with Chelsea and the 2021–22 UEFA Europa Conference League with Roma.

=== Previous finals ===
In the following table, finals until 2009 were in the UEFA Cup era and since 2010 were in the UEFA Europa League era.

Team	Previous final appearance (Bold indicates winners)
(German Football Association) SC Freiburg	none
(The Football Association) Aston Villa	none

== Venue ==
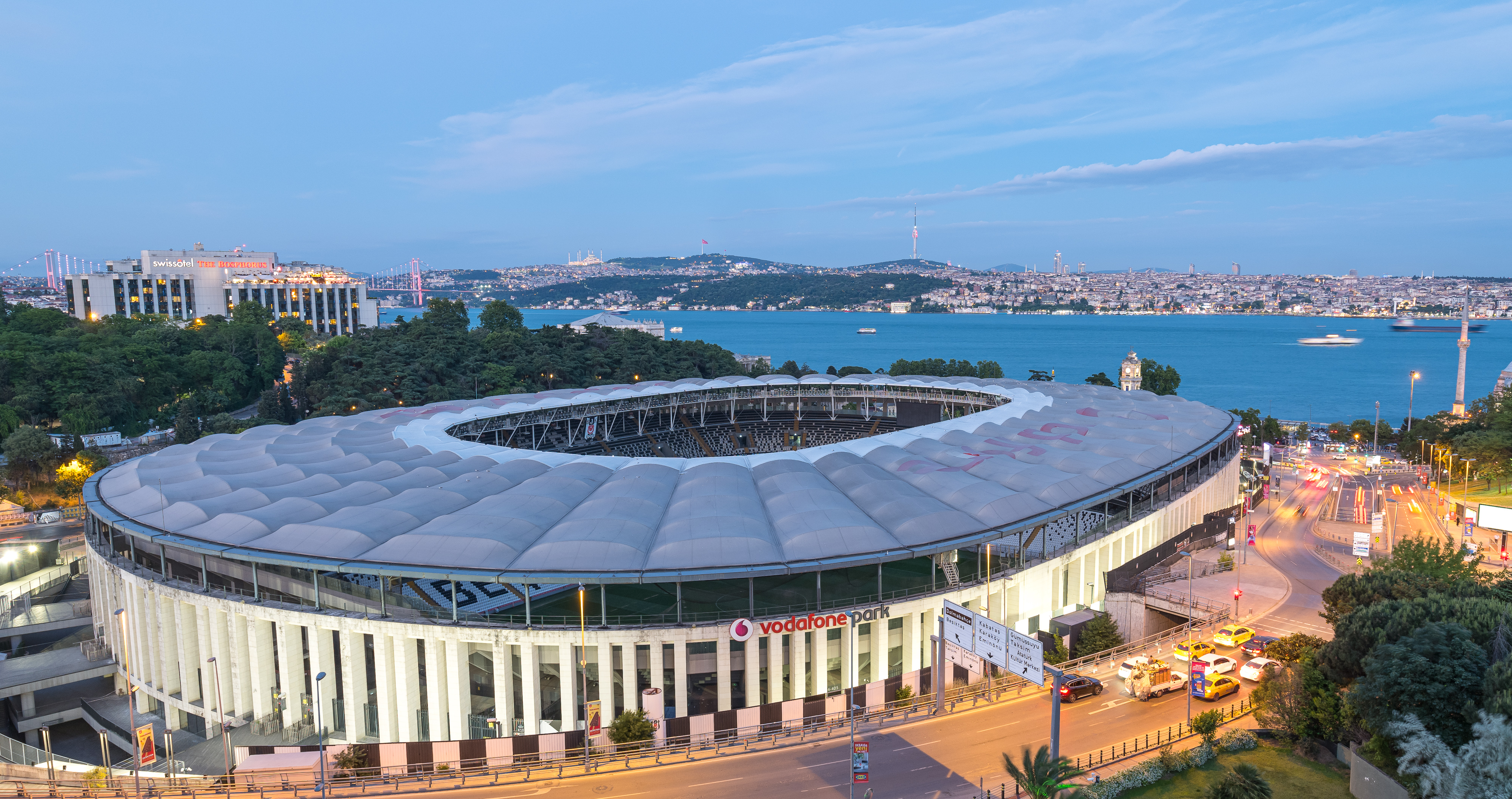
Beşiktaş Stadium in Istanbul hosted the final.

=== Host selection ===
On 17 May 2023, UEFA opened the bidding process for the final, which was held in parallel with that of the 2027 final. Interested bidders could bid for either one or both of the finals. Additionally, bidding associations could only be appointed one UEFA final in a given year. The proposed venues had to include natural grass and be ranked as a UEFA category four stadium, with a gross capacity of 40,000 to 60,000 preferred. The bidding timeline was as follows:

- 17 May 2023: Applications formally invited
- 17 July 2023: Closing date for registering intention to bid
- 26 July 2023: Bid requirements made available to bidders
- 15 November 2023: Submission of preliminary bid dossier
- 21 February 2024: Submission of final bid dossier
- 22 May 2024: Appointment of host

UEFA announced on 18 July 2023 that four associations had expressed interest in hosting the 2026 and 2027 finals during the first bidding process.

Bidding associations for 2026 and 2027 UEFA Europa League finals
Association	Stadium	City	Capacity	Notes
Germany	Waldstadion	Frankfurt	53,800	Association also bid for 2026 or 2027 Conference League and 2026 or 2027 Women's Champions League finals (with different venues); Merkur Spiel-Arena in Düsseldorf, Arena AufSchalke in Gelsenkirchen, Red Bull Arena in Leipzig or MHPArena in Stuttgart were also included as possible venues prior to official bid submission Stadium appointed as host of 2027 Europa League final; association appointed as host of 2026 Conference League final
Romania	Arena Națională	Bucharest	55,634	
Scotland	Hampden Park	Glasgow	51,866	Stadium also bid for 2026 or 2027 Conference League and 2026 or 2027 Women's Champions League finals
Turkey	Beşiktaş Stadium	Istanbul	42,684	Stadium also bid for 2026 or 2027 Conference League finals Rams Park or Şükrü Saracoğlu Stadium (both also in Istanbul) were also included as possible venues prior to official bid submission

Beşiktaş Stadium was selected as the venue by the UEFA Executive Committee during their meeting in Dublin, Republic of Ireland, on 22 May 2024.

== Route to the final ==
Note: In all results below, the score of the finalist is given first (H: home; A: away).

(German Football Association) SC Freiburg				Round	(The Football Association) Aston Villa			
Opponent	Result			League phase	Opponent	Result		
(Swiss Football Association) Basel	2–1 (H)			Matchday 1	(Italian Football Federation) Bologna	1–0 (H)		
(Italian Football Federation) Bologna	1–1 (A)			Matchday 2	(Royal Dutch Football Association) Feyenoord	2–0 (A)		
(Royal Dutch Football Association) Utrecht	2–0 (H)			Matchday 3	(Royal Dutch Football Association) Go Ahead Eagles	1–2 (A)		
(French Football Federation) Nice	3–1 (A)			Matchday 4	(Israel Football Association) Maccabi Tel Aviv	2–0 (H)		
(Football Association of the Czech Republic) Viktoria Plzeň	0–0 (A)			Matchday 5	(Swiss Football Association) Young Boys	2–1 (H)		
(Austrian Football Association) Red Bull Salzburg	1–0 (H)			Matchday 6	(Swiss Football Association) Basel	2–1 (A)		
(Israel Football Association) Maccabi Tel Aviv	1–0 (H)			Matchday 7	(Turkish Football Federation) Fenerbahçe	1–0 (A)		
(French Football Federation) Lille	0–1 (A)			Matchday 8	(Austrian Football Association) Red Bull Salzburg	3–2 (H)		
7th place Advanced to round of 16				Final position	2nd place Advanced to round of 16			
Opponent	Agg.	1st leg	2nd leg	Knockout phase	Opponent	Agg.	1st leg	2nd leg
(Royal Belgian Football Association) Genk	5–2	0–1 (A)	5–1 (H)	Round of 16	(French Football Federation) Lille	3–0	1–0 (A)	2–0 (H)
(Royal Spanish Football Federation) Celta Vigo	6–1	3–0 (H)	3–1 (A)	Quarter-finals	(Italian Football Federation) Bologna	7–1	3–1 (A)	4–0 (H)
(Portuguese Football Federation) Braga	4–3	1–2 (A)	3–1 (H)	Semi-finals	(The Football Association) Nottingham Forest	4–1	0–1 (A)	4–0 (H)

== Match ==
=== Summary ===
In the 41st minute, Aston Villa went in front when Youri Tielemans scored with a right foot volley low to the left corner of the net after a short corner routine from the left ended with the ball being crossed into him. It was 2–0, three minutes into added on time in the first half when Emiliano Buendía curled a shot into the top left corner of the net from 18 yards out on the right. Morgan Rogers got a third goal for Aston Villa in the 58th minute when he diverted a low cross from Emiliano Buendía on the left in at the near post past Freiburg goalkeeper Noah Atubolu. Aston Villa went on to win the game 3–0 and win their first trophy in 30 years.

=== Details ===
The "home" team (for administrative purposes) was predetermined as the winners of semi-final 1 (SC Freiburg).

20 May 2026
21:00 (22:00 UTC+3)

SC Freiburg (Germany)	0–3	(The Football Association) Aston Villa
	Report	Tielemans 41'; Buendía 45+3'; Rogers 58'

Beşiktaş Stadium, Istanbul
Attendance: 37,324
Referee: François Letexier (France)

SC Freiburg	Aston Villa

GK	1	(Germany) Noah Atubolu
RB	17	(Germany) Lukas Kübler		(substituted off) 73'
CB	28	(Germany) Matthias Ginter
CB	3	(Austria) Philipp Lienhart		(substituted off) 61'
LB	29	(Germany) Philipp Treu	(yellow card) 5'
CM	8	(Germany) Maximilian Eggestein
CM	27	(Germany) Nicolas Höfler		(substituted off) 61'
RW	19	(Germany) Jan-Niklas Beste		(substituted off) 86'
AM	44	(Switzerland) Johan Manzambi
LW	32	(Italy) Vincenzo Grifo (c)		(substituted off) 73'
CF	31	(Croatia) Igor Matanović
Substitutes:
GK	21	(Germany) Florian Müller
GK	24	(Germany) Jannik Huth
DF	5	(Germany) Anthony Jung
DF	30	(Germany) Christian Günter		(substituted on) 86'
DF	33	(France) Jordy Makengo		(substituted on) 73'
DF	37	(Germany) Max Rosenfelder		(substituted on) 61'
DF	43	(Switzerland) Bruno Ogbus
MF	6	(Germany) Patrick Osterhage
FW	7	(Germany) Derry Scherhant		(substituted on) 73'
FW	9	(Germany) Lucas Höler		(substituted on) 61'
FW	22	(Burkina Faso) Cyriaque Irié
FW	26	(Germany) Maximilian Philipp
Manager:
(Germany) Julian Schuster

GK	23	(Argentina) Emiliano Martínez
RB	2	(Poland) Matty Cash	(yellow card) 21'
CB	4	(England) Ezri Konsa
CB	14	(Spain) Pau Torres		(substituted off) 88'
LB	12	(France) Lucas Digne		(substituted off) 81'
CM	3	(Sweden) Victor Lindelöf		(substituted off) 66'
CM	8	(Belgium) Youri Tielemans		(substituted off) 88'
RW	7	(Scotland) John McGinn (c)	(yellow card) 84'
AM	27	(England) Morgan Rogers
LW	10	(Argentina) Emiliano Buendía	(yellow card) 15'	(substituted off) 81'
CF	11	(England) Ollie Watkins
Substitutes:
GK	40	(Netherlands) Marco Bizot
GK	64	(England) James Wright
DF	5	(England) Tyrone Mings		(substituted on) 88'
DF	16	(Spain) Andrés García
DF	22	(Netherlands) Ian Maatsen		(substituted on) 81'
MF	9	(England) Harvey Elliott
MF	19	(England) Jadon Sancho		(substituted on) 81'
MF	21	(Brazil) Douglas Luiz		(substituted on) 88'
MF	24	(Belgium) Amadou Onana		(substituted on) 66'
MF	26	(Netherlands) Lamare Bogarde
FW	18	(England) Tammy Abraham
FW	31	(Jamaica) Leon Bailey
Manager:
(Spain) Unai Emery

Man of the Match:
Emiliano Buendía (Aston Villa)

Assistant referees:
Cyril Mugnier (France)
Mehdi Rahmouni (France)
Fourth official:
Alejandro Hernández Hernández (Spain)
Reserve assistant referee:
José Enrique Naranjo Pérez (Spain)
Video assistant referee:
Jérôme Brisard (France)
Assistant video assistant referee:
Willy Delajod (France)
Support video assistant referee:
Dennis Higler (Netherlands)

Match rules

- 90 minutes
- 30 minutes of extra time if necessary
- Penalty shoot-out if scores still level
- Maximum of twelve named substitutes
- Maximum of five substitutions, with a sixth allowed in extra time
- Maximum of three substitution opportunities, with a fourth allowed in extra time

=== Statistics ===
First half
Statistic	SC Freiburg	Aston Villa
Goals scored	0	2
Total shots	3	9
Shots on target	1	3
Saves	1	1
Ball possession	43%	57%
Corner kicks	1	4
Fouls committed	9	8
Offsides	1	1
Yellow cards	1	2
Red cards	0	0

Second half
Statistic	SC Freiburg	Aston Villa
Goals scored	0	1
Total shots	1	8
Shots on target	1	3
Saves	2	1
Ball possession	62%	38%
Corner kicks	0	4
Fouls committed	6	7
Offsides	4	1
Yellow cards	0	1
Red cards	0	0

Overall
Statistic	SC Freiburg	Aston Villa
Goals scored	0	3
Total shots	4	17
Shots on target	2	6
Saves	3	2
Ball possession	52%	48%
Corner kicks	1	8
Fouls committed	15	15
Offsides	5	2
Yellow cards	1	3
Red cards	0	0

== See also ==
- 2026 UEFA Champions League final
- 2026 UEFA Conference League final
- 2026 UEFA Women's Champions League final
- 2026 UEFA Women's Europa Cup final
- 2026 UEFA Super Cup
- Aston Villa F.C. in international football
