= Peter Mayen =

South Sudanese politician

Peter Mayen Majongdit, commonly referred to as Peter Mayen, is a South Sudanese politician and the former minister of Humanitarian Affairs and Disaster Management between March 2020 and November 2022.

President of South Sudan, Salva Kiir fired him on the 16th of November 2022 amid rising hunger across the country's flood and conflict-affected areas. Mayen has been the subject of multiple controversies.

Mayen has announced a bid to unseat president Kiir in the 2026 South Sudanese general election, being affiliated with the People's Liberal Party.

== Controversy ==
In 2021, Mayen was accused by the members of public and the civil society activists for allegedly beating and stabbing his wife. This caused removal of his membership of the OPP (Other Political Parties). A petition was launched by civil rights activists to have him removed from his ministerial position.
