= 2026 UEFA Champions League final =

Football match in Budapest, Hungary

- Match programme cover
- Event: 2025–26 UEFA Champions League
Paris Saint-Germain	Arsenal
(French Football Federation)	(The Football Association)
1	1
- After extra time Paris Saint-Germain won 4–3 on penalties
- Date: 30 May 2026
- Venue: Puskás Aréna, Budapest
- Man of the Match: Vitinha (Paris Saint-Germain)
- Referee: Daniel Siebert (Germany)
- Attendance: 61,035
- Weather: Sunny; 24 °C (75 °F); 43% humidity

The 2026 UEFA Champions League final was the final match of the 2025–26 UEFA Champions League, the 71st season of Europe's premier club football tournament organised by UEFA, and the 34th season since it was renamed from the European Champion Clubs' Cup to the UEFA Champions League. It was played at the Puskás Aréna in Budapest, Hungary, on 30 May 2026 between French club Paris Saint-Germain, the defending champions, and English club Arsenal. This was the first final to include a titleholder team since 2018, as well as Arsenal’s first Champions League Final appearance since 2006, where they lost to FC Barcelona 2–1.

Paris Saint-Germain won the match 4–3 on penalties, following a 1–1 draw after extra time, for their second UEFA Champions League title, becoming the second club to win back-to-back titles in the UEFA Champions League era, matching Real Madrid's feat in the 2016–17 edition. As winners, Paris Saint-Germain earned the right to play against Aston Villa, the winners of the 2025–26 UEFA Europa League, in the 2026 UEFA Super Cup, winning the title. They will also compete in the final of the 2026 FIFA Intercontinental Cup, and qualified for the 2029 FIFA Club World Cup.

== Background ==
Paris Saint-Germain reached their third European Cup/Champions League final overall and second consecutively, having lost to Bayern Munich in 2020 before winning the title in 2025. They also became the first team since Liverpool in 2018 and 2019 to reach two consecutive Champions League finals. This was their seventh UEFA competition final overall, having also triumphed in the 1996 UEFA Cup Winners' Cup final and 2025 UEFA Super Cup. They lost the Cup Winners' Cup final in 1997 as holders, as well as losing the 1996 UEFA Super Cup. Paris Saint-Germain was the first French team to appear in three European Cup/Champions League finals, surpassing their rivals Marseille, who lost in 1991 before their victory in 1993, as well as Stade Reims, who lost both the 1956 and 1959 European Cup finals to Real Madrid.

Arsenal reached their second European Cup/Champions League final, having lost to Barcelona in 2006. This was their eighth UEFA competition final overall, having triumphed in the 1994 European Cup Winners' Cup final. They lost the Cup Winners' Cup finals in 1980 and 1995—the latter as holders, as well as losing the 1994 European Super Cup, 2000 UEFA Cup final, and 2019 UEFA Europa League final.

Both clubs won their respective leagues and were eliminated from other cup competitions, thus aiming for a continental double. This was the first time since 2020 where both Champions League finalists were champions of their respective domestic leagues. The two teams met in the 2025 semi-finals, with Paris Saint-Germain winning both legs (1–0 at the Emirates Stadium and then 2–1 at the Parc des Princes).

The 2026 final was the fourth European Cup final between sides from two different capital cities after 1962, 1966 and 1971.

The "home" team (for administrative purposes) was predetermined as the winners of semi-final 1 (Paris Saint-Germain). This was the first Champions League final to kick off at 18:00 CEST, three hours earlier than previous editions. UEFA stated that the change was made to "enhance the matchday experience and benefit fans, teams and host cities".

=== Previous finals ===
In the following table, finals until 1992 were in the European Cup era and since 1993 were in the UEFA Champions League era.

Team	Previous final appearances (bold indicates winners)
(French Football Federation) Paris Saint-Germain	2 (2020, **2025**)
(The Football Association) Arsenal	1 (2006)

== Venue ==
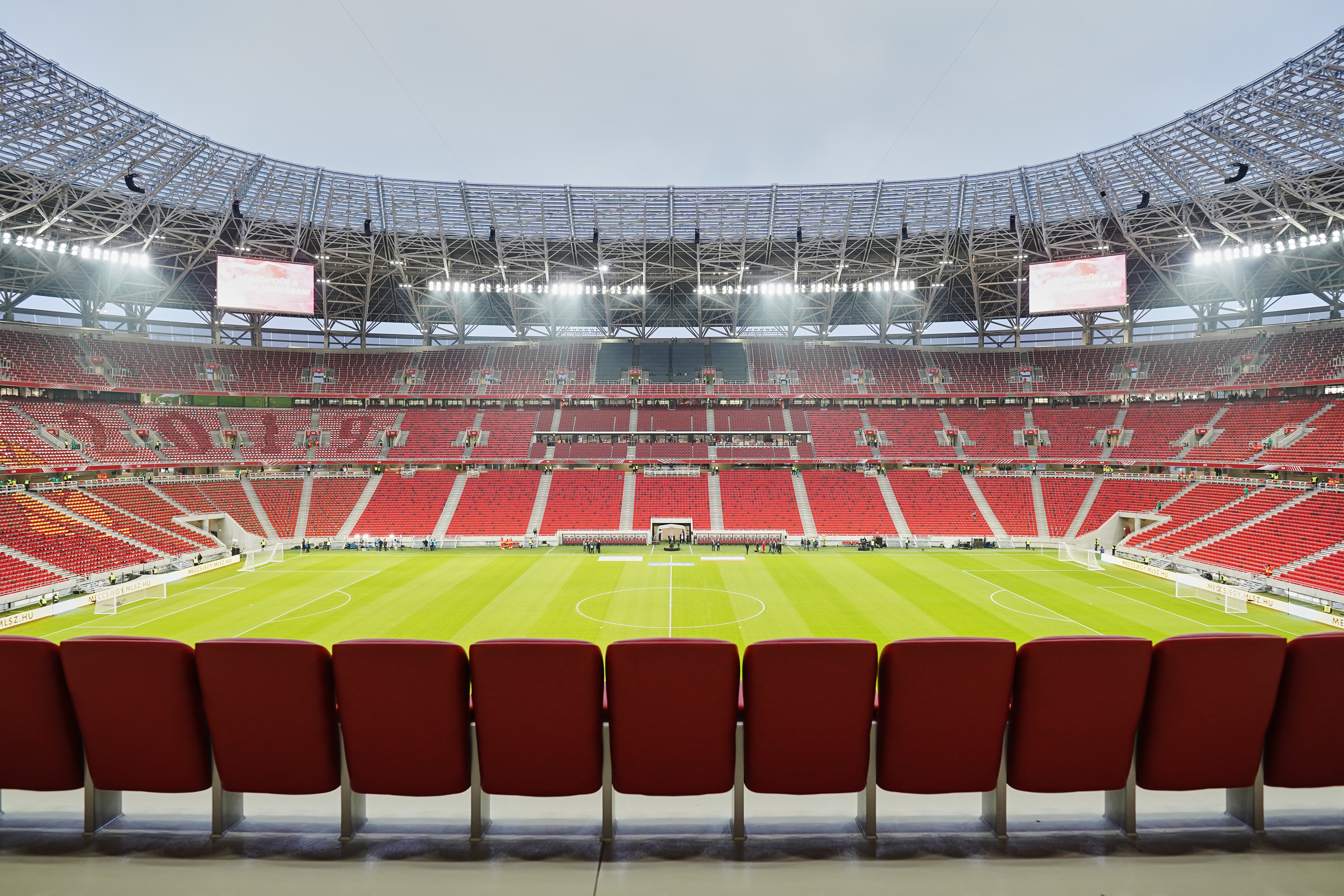
The Puskás Aréna in Budapest hosted the final.

=== Host selection ===
On 17 May 2023, UEFA opened the bidding process for the final, which was held in parallel with that of the 2027 final. Interested bidders could bid for either one or both of the finals. Additionally, bidding associations could only be appointed one UEFA final in a given year. The proposed venues had to include natural grass and be ranked as a UEFA category four stadium, with a gross capacity of at least 70,000 preferred. The bidding timeline was as follows:

- 17 May 2023: Applications formally invited
- 17 July 2023: Closing date for registering intention to bid
- 26 July 2023: Bid requirements made available to bidders
- 15 November 2023: Submission of preliminary bid dossier
- 21 February 2024: Submission of final bid dossier
- 22 May 2024: Appointment of host

UEFA announced on 18 July 2023 that two associations had expressed interest in hosting the 2026 and 2027 finals during the first bidding process.

Bidding associations for 2026 and 2027 UEFA Champions League finals
Association	Stadium	City	Capacity
Hungary	Puskás Aréna	Budapest	67,215
Italy	San Siro	Milan	75,817

The Puskás Aréna was selected as the venue by the UEFA Executive Committee during their meeting in Dublin, Ireland, on 22 May 2024.

== Route to the final ==
Note: In all results below, the score of the finalist is given first (H: home; A: away).

(French Football Federation) Paris Saint-Germain				Round	(The Football Association) Arsenal			
Opponent	Result			League phase	Opponent	Result		
(Italian Football Federation) Atalanta	4–0 (H)			Matchday 1	(Royal Spanish Football Federation) Athletic Bilbao	2–0 (A)		
(Royal Spanish Football Federation) Barcelona	2–1 (A)			Matchday 2	(Hellenic Football Federation) Olympiacos	2–0 (H)		
(German Football Association) Bayer Leverkusen	7–2 (A)			Matchday 3	(Royal Spanish Football Federation) Atlético Madrid	4–0 (H)		
(German Football Association) Bayern Munich	1–2 (H)			Matchday 4	(Football Association of the Czech Republic) Slavia Prague	3–0 (A)		
(The Football Association) Tottenham Hotspur	5–3 (H)			Matchday 5	(German Football Association) Bayern Munich	3–1 (H)		
(Royal Spanish Football Federation) Athletic Bilbao	0–0 (A)			Matchday 6	(Royal Belgian Football Association) Club Brugge	3–0 (A)		
(Portuguese Football Federation) Sporting CP	1–2 (A)			Matchday 7	(Italian Football Federation) Inter Milan	3–1 (A)		
(The Football Association) Newcastle United	1–1 (H)			Matchday 8	(Kazakhstan Football Federation) Kairat	3–2 (H)		
11th place Advanced to knockout phase play-offs				Final position	1st place Advanced to round of 16			
Opponent	Agg.	1st leg	2nd leg	Knockout phase	Opponent	Agg.	1st leg	2nd leg
(French Football Federation) Monaco	5–4	3–2 (A)	2–2 (H)	Play-offs	Bye			
(The Football Association) Chelsea	8–2	5–2 (H)	3–0 (A)	Round of 16	(German Football Association) Bayer Leverkusen	3–1	1–1 (A)	2–0 (H)
(The Football Association) Liverpool	4–0	2–0 (H)	2–0 (A)	Quarter-finals	(Portuguese Football Federation) Sporting CP	1–0	1–0 (A)	0–0 (H)
(German Football Association) Bayern Munich	6–5	5–4 (H)	1–1 (A)	Semi-finals	(Royal Spanish Football Federation) Atlético Madrid	2–1	1–1 (A)	1–0 (H)

== Opening ceremony ==
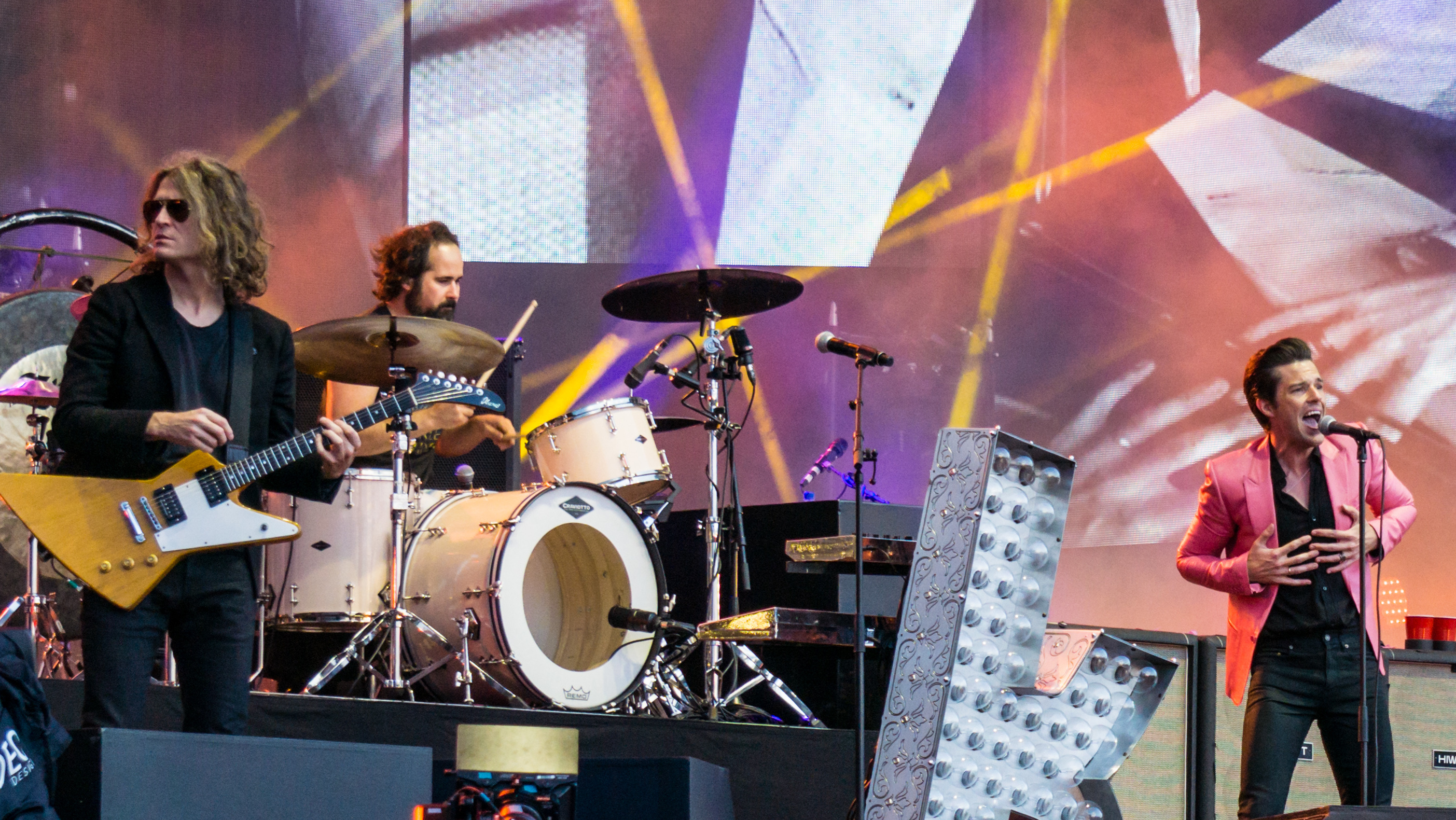
American rock band The Killers (pictured in 2017) were announced to perform at the 2026 UEFA Champions League final's opening ceremony.

On 26 March 2026, American indie rock band The Killers were announced as the performers for the final's Pepsi opening ceremony, and was promoted by a trailer starring Killers frontman Brandon Flowers and football star David Beckham on a short film named The Race Begins.

== Match ==
=== Summary ===
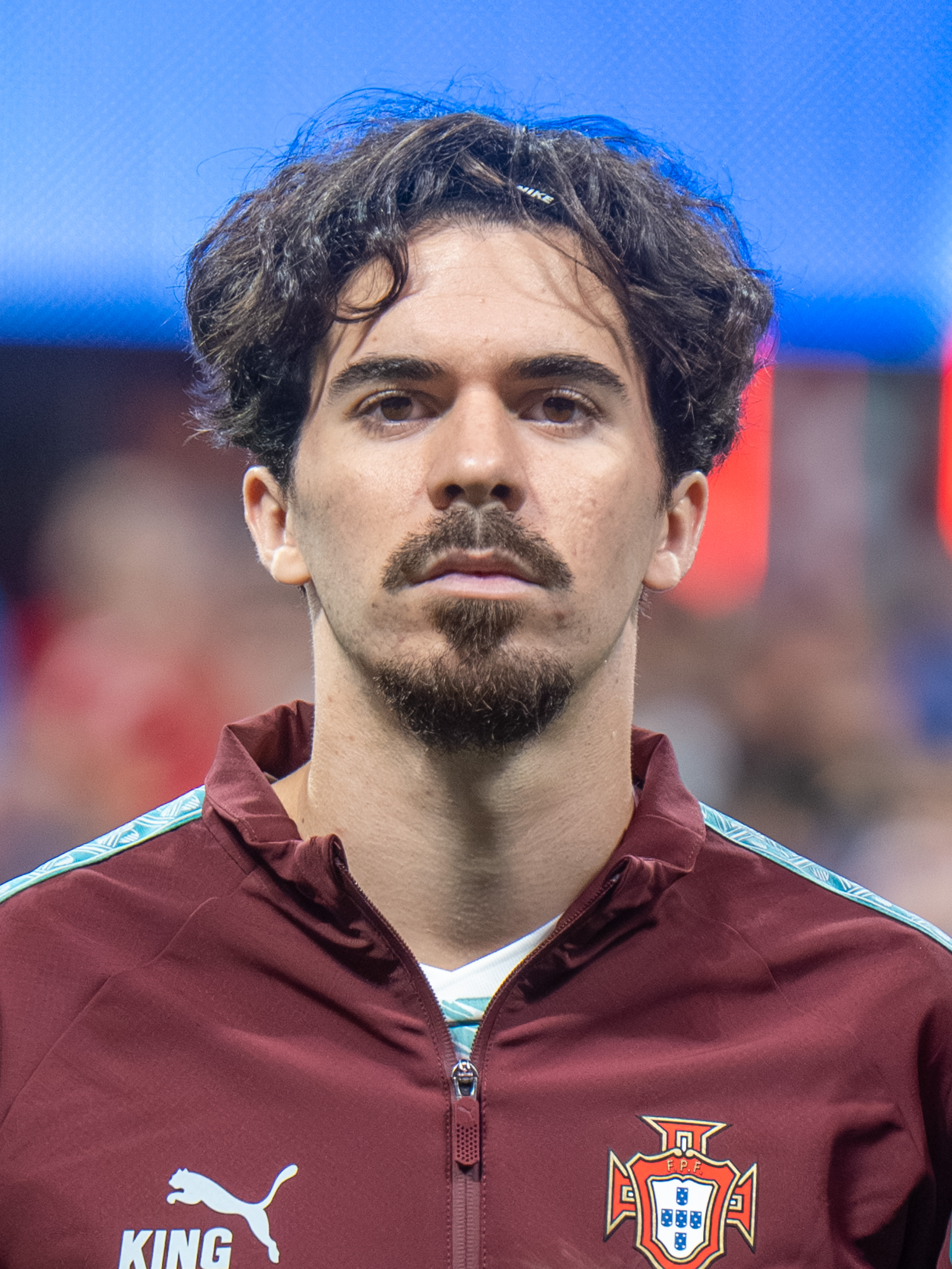
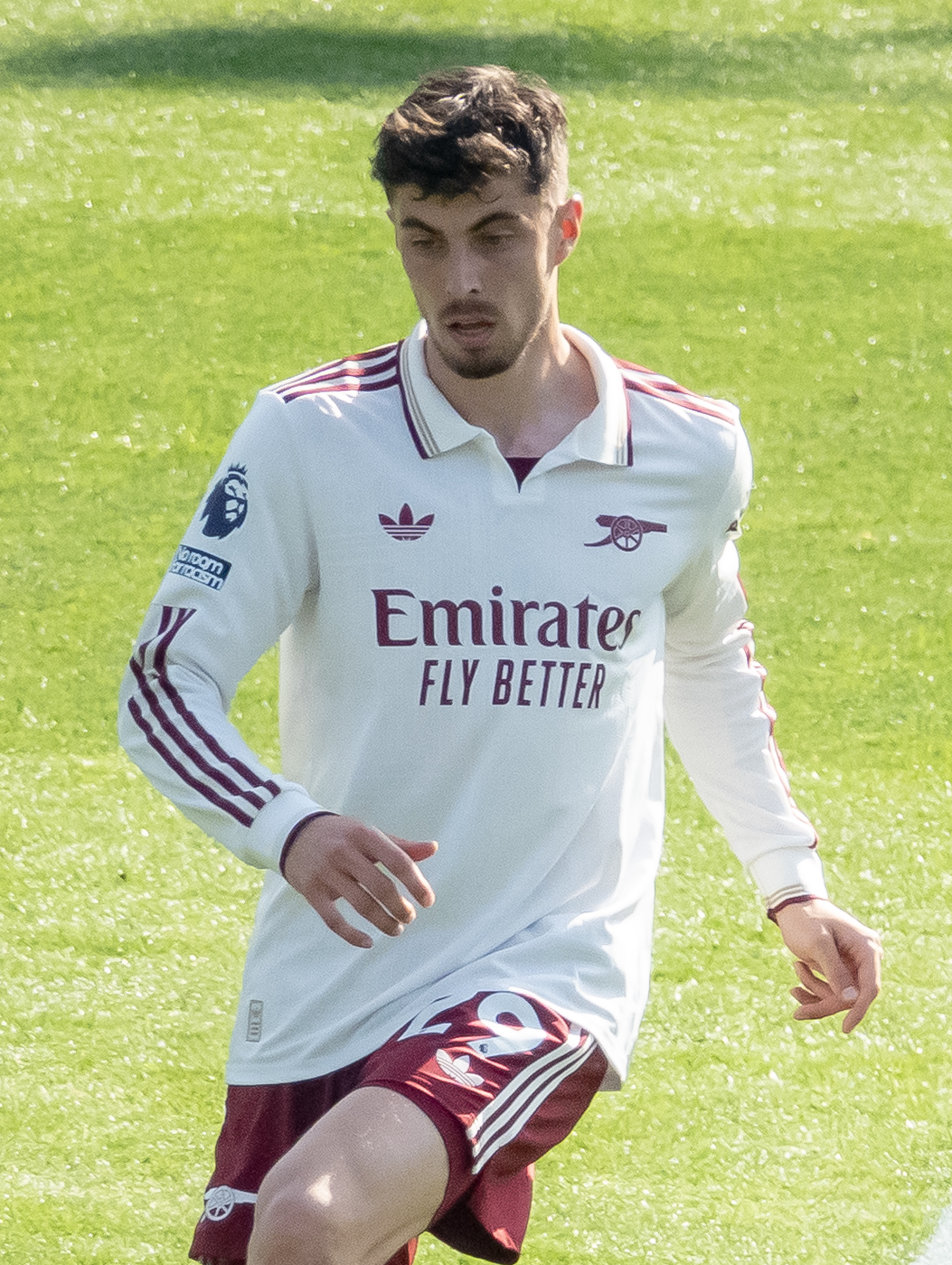
Paris Saint-Germain midfielder Vitinha (left) was named man of the match, while his opponent midfielder Kai Havertz (right) scored the earliest goal of the match.

In the sixth minute of the match, an attempted clearance by Paris Saint-Germain defender Marquinhos deflected off Arsenal's Leandro Trossard. The deflected ball fell to Arsenal striker Kai Havertz, who beat the Paris Saint-Germain goalkeeper Matvey Safonov from a tight angle, putting Arsenal 1–0 ahead. It would be their only shot on target throughout the match.

In the 61st minute, Arsenal's Cristhian Mosquera fouled Khvicha Kvaratskhelia inside the penalty box. Ousmane Dembélé converted the resulting penalty kick, tying the score at 1–1. In the 77th minute, a shot by Kvaratskhelia was deflected onto the post by Myles Lewis-Skelly. By the end of the second half, Paris Saint-Germain had made 18 attempts on goal (four on target), while Arsenal had made four attempts (one on target). With the score still tied, the game went to extra time.

In the 103rd minute, Paris Saint-Germain's Nuno Mendes tackled Noni Madueke to the ground in his team's penalty area, prompting appeals for a penalty kick by Arsenal players. However, the referee awarded a free kick to Paris Saint-Germain instead, adjudging that Madueke had grabbed Mendes' arm, and issued yellow cards to Arsenal player Declan Rice and manager Mikel Arteta for their protests. Extra time ended with the score tied 1–1 and the match proceeded to a penalty shoot-out.

Paris Saint-Germain went first in the shoot-out, with Gonçalo Ramos converting his penalty. This was followed by successful attempts by Arsenal's Viktor Gyökeres and Paris Saint-Germain's Désiré Doué. The first miss was by Arsenal's Eberechi Eze, who shot wide left, which was immediately followed by Arsenal goalkeeper David Raya saving Mendes' attempt. Four successful attempts followed, two for each team, by Rice, Achraf Hakimi, Gabriel Martinelli, and Lucas Beraldo, leaving Paris Saint-Germain ahead 4–3 with one penalty attempt to come before the sudden-death round. Gabriel sent his shot over the bar, giving Paris Saint-Germain the victory.

=== Details ===
30 May 2026
18:00 UTC+2

Paris Saint-Germain (French Football Federation)	1–1 (a.e.t.)	(The Football Association) Arsenal
Dembélé 65' (pen.)	Report	Havertz 6'
Penalties
Ramos (penalty scored); Doué (penalty scored); Mendes (penalty missed); Hakimi (penalty scored); Beraldo (penalty scored)	4–3	(penalty scored) Gyökeres; (penalty missed) Eze; (penalty scored) Rice; (penalty scored) Martinelli; (penalty missed) Gabriel

Puskás Aréna, Budapest
Attendance: 61,035
Referee: Daniel Siebert (Germany)

Paris Saint-Germain	Arsenal

GK	39	(Russia) Matvey Safonov
RB	2	(Morocco) Achraf Hakimi
CB	5	(Brazil) Marquinhos (c)		(substituted off) 106'
CB	51	(Ecuador) Willian Pacho
LB	25	(Portugal) Nuno Mendes	(yellow card) 118'
RM	87	(Portugal) João Neves	(yellow card) 90+6'
CM	17	(Portugal) Vitinha		(substituted off) 106'
LM	8	(Spain) Fabián Ruiz		(substituted off) 95'
RF	14	(France) Désiré Doué
CF	10	(France) Ousmane Dembélé		(substituted off) 90+6'
LF	7	(Georgia (country)) Khvicha Kvaratskhelia		(substituted off) 83'
Substitutes:
GK	30	(France) Lucas Chevalier
GK	89	(Italy) Renato Marin
DF	4	(Brazil) Lucas Beraldo		(substituted on) 106'
DF	6	(Ukraine) Illia Zabarnyi		(substituted on) 106'
DF	21	(France) Lucas Hernandez
MF	19	(South Korea) Lee Kang-in
MF	24	(France) Senny Mayulu
MF	27	(Spain) Dro Fernández
MF	33	(France) Warren Zaïre-Emery		(substituted on) 95'
FW	9	(Portugal) Gonçalo Ramos		(substituted on) 90+6'
FW	29	(France) Bradley Barcola		(substituted on) 83'
FW	49	(Senegal) Ibrahim Mbaye
Manager:
(Spain) Luis Enrique

GK	1	(Spain) David Raya
RB	3	(Spain) Cristhian Mosquera	(yellow card) 47'	(substituted off) 66'
CB	2	(France) William Saliba
CB	6	(Brazil) Gabriel Magalhães
LB	5	(Ecuador) Piero Hincapié
CM	41	(England) Declan Rice	(yellow card) 103'
CM	49	(England) Myles Lewis-Skelly		(substituted off) 91'
RW	7	(England) Bukayo Saka	(yellow card) 54'	(substituted off) 83'
AM	8	(Norway) Martin Ødegaard (c)		(substituted off) 67'
LW	19	(Belgium) Leandro Trossard		(substituted off) 83'
CF	29	(Germany) Kai Havertz		(substituted off) 91'
Substitutes:
GK	13	(Spain) Kepa Arrizabalaga
DF	12	(Netherlands) Jurriën Timber		(substituted on) 66'
DF	33	(Italy) Riccardo Calafiori
MF	10	(England) Eberechi Eze		(substituted on) 91'
MF	16	(Denmark) Christian Nørgaard
MF	20	(England) Noni Madueke		(substituted on) 83'
MF	23	(Spain) Mikel Merino
MF	36	(Spain) Martín Zubimendi		(substituted on) 91'
MF	56	(England) Max Dowman
FW	9	(Brazil) Gabriel Jesus
FW	11	(Brazil) Gabriel Martinelli		(substituted on) 83'
FW	14	(Sweden) Viktor Gyökeres	(yellow card) 98'	(substituted on) 67'
Manager:
(Spain) Mikel Arteta			(yellow card) 103'

Man of the Match:
Vitinha (Paris Saint-Germain)

Assistant referees:
Jan Seidel (Germany)
Rafael Foltyn (Germany)
Fourth official:
Sandro Schärer (Switzerland)
Reserve assistant referee:
Guadalupe Porras Ayuso (Spain)
Video assistant referee:
Bastian Dankert (Germany)
Assistant video assistant referee:
Robert Schröder (Germany)
Support video assistant referee:
Carlos del Cerro Grande (Spain)

Match rules

- 90 minutes
- 30 minutes of extra time if necessary
- Penalty shoot-out if scores still level
- Maximum of twelve named substitutes
- Maximum of five substitutions, with a sixth allowed in extra time
- Maximum of three substitution opportunities, with a fourth allowed in extra time

=== Statistics ===
First half
Statistic	Paris Saint-Germain	Arsenal
Goals scored	0	1
Total shots	6	3
Shots on target	1	1
Saves	0	1
Ball possession	74%	26%
Corner kicks	4	0
Fouls committed	4	4
Offsides	0	1
Yellow cards	0	0
Red cards	0	0

Second half
Statistic	Paris Saint-Germain	Arsenal
Goals scored	1	0
Total shots	12	1
Shots on target	2	0
Saves	0	1
Ball possession	71%	29%
Corner kicks	6	0
Fouls committed	5	8
Offsides	0	2
Yellow cards	1	2
Red cards	0	0

Extra time
Statistic	Paris Saint-Germain	Arsenal
Goals scored	0	0
Total shots	3	4
Shots on target	1	0
Saves	0	1
Ball possession	70%	30%
Corner kicks	1	3
Fouls committed	2	5
Offsides	0	0
Yellow cards	1	3
Red cards	0	0

Overall
Statistic	Paris Saint-Germain	Arsenal
Goals scored	1	1
Total shots	21	8
Shots on target	4	1
Saves	0	3
Ball possession	72%	28%
Corner kicks	11	3
Fouls committed	11	17
Offsides	0	3
Yellow cards	2	5
Red cards	0	0

== Aftermath ==
Following PSG's victory, tens of thousands of fans celebrated on the streets of Paris. Violent clashes erupted as the celebrations developed into rioting; there were 283 arrests in Paris and another 133 in the rest of France. The French Interior Ministry deployed 22,000 security officers across the country, including 8,000 in the capital. Similar riots had occurred the previous year following PSG's victory in the 2025 final.

== See also ==
- 2026 UEFA Europa League final
- 2026 UEFA Conference League final
- 2026 UEFA Women's Champions League final
- 2026 UEFA Women's Europa Cup final
- 2026 UEFA Super Cup
- Arsenal F.C. in European football
- Paris Saint-Germain FC in international football
- 2025–26 Arsenal F.C. season
- 2025–26 Paris Saint-Germain FC season
- 2026 Paris Saint-Germain celebration riots
