= 2026 UEFA Conference League final =

Football match in Leipzig, Germany

- Match programme cover
- Event: 2025–26 UEFA Conference League
Crystal Palace	Rayo Vallecano
(The Football Association)	(Royal Spanish Football Federation)
1	0
- Date: 27 May 2026
- Venue: Red Bull Arena, Leipzig
- Man of the Match: Adam Wharton (Crystal Palace)
- Referee: Maurizio Mariani (Italy)
- Attendance: 39,176
- Weather: Clear night 19 °C (66 °F); 35% humidity

The 2026 UEFA Conference League final was the final match of the 2025–26 UEFA Conference League, the fifth season of Europe's tertiary club football tournament organised by UEFA, and the second season since it was renamed from the UEFA Europa Conference League to the UEFA Conference League. It was played at the Red Bull Arena in Leipzig, Germany, on 27 May 2026 between English club Crystal Palace and Spanish club Rayo Vallecano.

Crystal Palace won the match 1–0 for their first UEFA Conference League title. As winners, they qualified for the league phase of the 2026–27 UEFA Europa League.

== Background ==
Crystal Palace, having played in a major European competition for the first time, reached their first ever European final. They were aiming for their second major trophy, having won the FA Cup in 2025, beating Manchester City in the final. As winners of the FA Cup, they were initially given a Europa League league phase berth but due to multi-club ownership restrictions regarding club stakeholder John Textor also having ownership of French team Olympique Lyonnais via Eagle Football Holdings, Crystal Palace's European qualification berth was switched with Nottingham Forest's, who initially took England's Conference League berth, by UEFA to prevent clubs with the same owners competing in the same tournament, as Lyon finished in a higher league position in France than Palace did in England.

Rayo Vallecano also reached their first ever European final, and were aiming for a first major title. Rayo Vallecano had previously qualified for the quarter-finals of the 2000–01 UEFA Cup, losing 4–2 on aggregate to fellow Spanish side Alavés.

== Venue ==
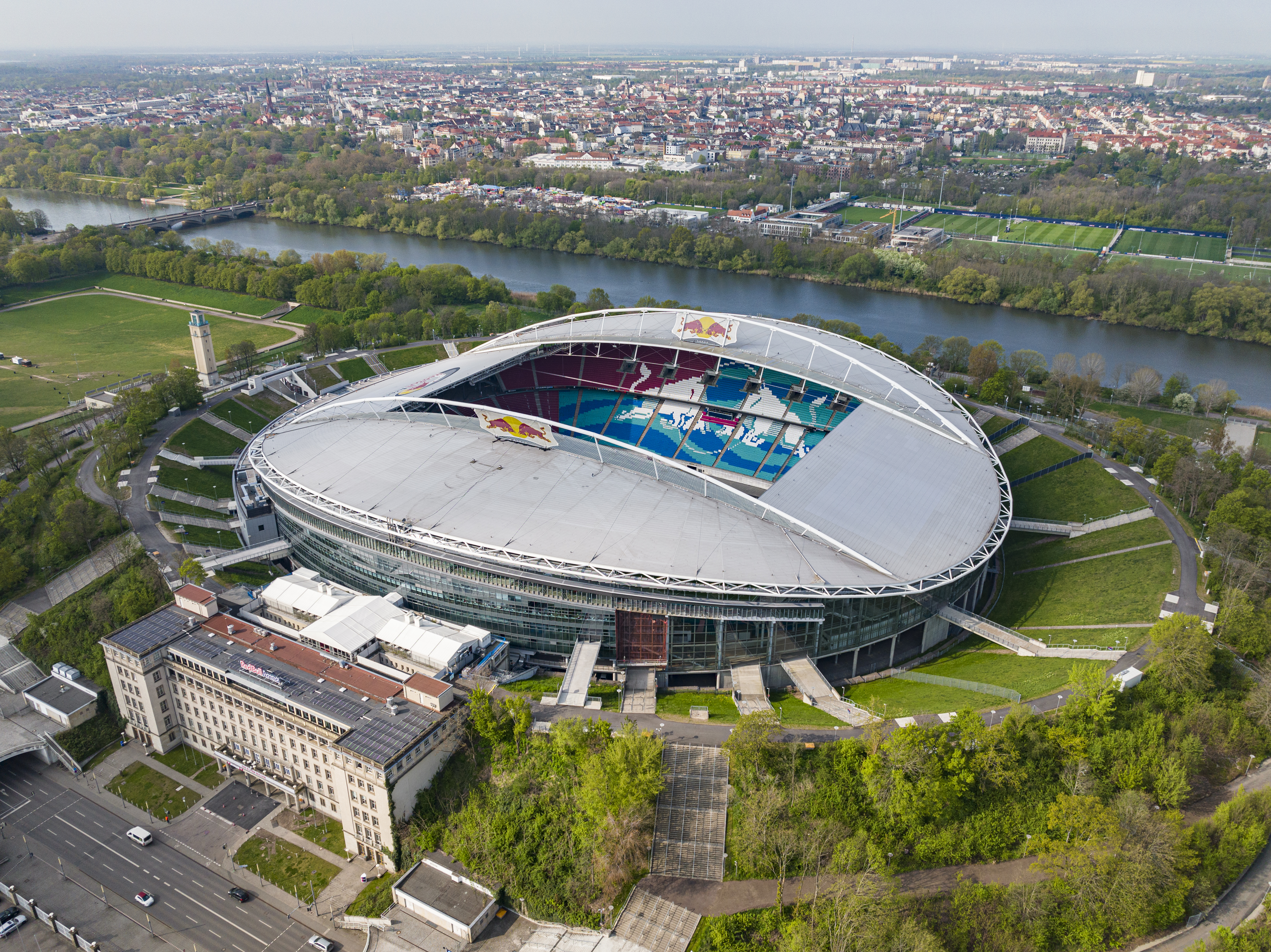
Red Bull Arena in Leipzig hosted the final.

=== Host selection ===
On 17 May 2023, UEFA opened the bidding process for the final, which was held in parallel with that of the 2027 final. Interested bidders could bid for either one or both of the finals. Additionally, bidding associations could only be appointed one UEFA final in a given year. The proposed venues had to include natural grass and be ranked as a UEFA category four stadium, with a gross capacity of 30,000 to 60,000 preferred. The bidding timeline was as follows:

- 17 May 2023: Applications formally invited
- 17 July 2023: Closing date for registering intention to bid
- 26 July 2023: Bid requirements made available to bidders
- 15 November 2023: Submission of preliminary bid dossier
- 21 February 2024: Submission of final bid dossier
- 22 May 2024: Appointment of host

UEFA announced on 18 July 2023 that six associations had expressed interest in hosting the 2026 and 2027 finals during the first bidding process.

Bidding associations for 2026 and 2027 UEFA Conference League finals
Association	Stadium	City	Capacity	Notes
Germany	Red Bull Arena	Leipzig	45,228	Association also bid for 2026 or 2027 Europa League and 2026 or 2027 Women's Champions League finals (with different venues)
Israel	Teddy Stadium	Jerusalem	31,733	
Norway	Ullevaal Stadion	Oslo	27,182	Stadium also bid for 2026 or 2027 Women's Champions League finals Stadium appointed as host of 2026 Women's Champions League final
Scotland	Hampden Park	Glasgow	51,866	Stadium also bid for 2026 or 2027 Europa League and 2026 or 2027 Women's Champions League finals
Switzerland	Stade de Genève	Geneva	30,084	
Turkey	Beşiktaş Stadium	Istanbul	42,684	Stadium also bid for 2026 or 2027 Europa League finals Rams Park or Şükrü Saracoğlu Stadium (both also in Istanbul) were also included as possible venues prior to official bid submission Stadium appointed as host of 2026 Europa League final and 2027 Conference League final

The Red Bull Arena was selected as the venue by the UEFA Executive Committee during their meeting in Dublin, Republic of Ireland, on 22 May 2024.

== Route to the final ==
Note: In all results below, the score of the finalist is given first (H: home; A: away).

(The Football Association) Crystal Palace				Round	(Royal Spanish Football Federation) Rayo Vallecano			
Opponent	Agg.	1st leg	2nd leg	Qualifying phase	Opponent	Agg.	1st leg	2nd leg
(Norwegian Football Federation) Fredrikstad	1–0	1–0 (H)	0–0 (A)	Play-off round	(Football Federation of Belarus) Neman Grodno	5–0	1–0 (A)	4–0 (H)
Opponent	Result			League phase	Opponent	Result		
(Ukrainian Association of Football) Dynamo Kyiv	2–0 (A)			Matchday 1	(Football Federation of Macedonia) Shkëndija	2–0 (H)		
(Cyprus Football Association) AEK Larnaca	0–1 (H)			Matchday 2	(Swedish Football Association) BK Häcken	2–2 (A)		
(Royal Dutch Football Association) AZ	3–1 (H)			Matchday 3	(Polish Football Association) Lech Poznań	3–2 (H)		
(French Football Federation) Strasbourg	1–2 (A)			Matchday 4	(Slovak Football Association) Slovan Bratislava	1–2 (A)		
(Football Association of Ireland) Shelbourne	3–0 (A)			Matchday 5	(Polish Football Association) Jagiellonia Białystok	2–1 (A)		
(Football Association of Finland) KuPS	2–2 (H)			Matchday 6	(Football Federation of Kosovo) Drita	3–0 (H)		
10th place Advanced to knockout phase play-offs				Final position	5th place Advanced to round of 16			
Opponent	Agg.	1st leg	2nd leg	Knockout phase	Opponent	Agg.	1st leg	2nd leg
(Football Association of Bosnia and Herzegovina) Zrinjski Mostar	3–1	1–1 (A)	2–0 (H)	Play-offs	Bye			
(Cyprus Football Association) AEK Larnaca	2–1	0–0 (H)	2–1 (a.e.t.) (A)	Round of 16	(Turkish Football Federation) Samsunspor	3–2	3–1 (A)	0–1 (H)
(Italian Football Federation) Fiorentina	4–2	3–0 (H)	1–2 (A)	Quarter-finals	(Hellenic Football Federation) AEK Athens	4–3	3–0 (H)	1–3 (A)
(Ukrainian Association of Football) Shakhtar Donetsk	5–2	3–1 (A)	2–1 (H)	Semi-finals	(French Football Federation) Strasbourg	2–0	1–0 (H)	1–0 (A)

== Match ==
=== Summary ===
Just before half-time, Crystal Palace's Tyrick Mitchell missed the target with a diving header from close range after a pass from Adam Wharton. Crystal Palace went in front in the 51st minute, an Adam Wharton shot from outside the penalty area on the left was saved by Rayo Vallecano goalkeeper Augusto Batalla but the rebound went straight to Jean-Philippe Mateta who diverted the ball with his left leg to the net from six yards out. Yeremy Pino almost made it 2–0 when his free-kick hit both posts and stayed out. Jean-Philippe Mateta also had a low shot saved by Augusto Batalla soon after. Crystal Palace held on to win the game 1–0 and claim a first European trophy.

=== Details ===
The "home" team (for administrative purposes) was predetermined as the winners of semi-final 1 (Crystal Palace).

27 May 2026
21:00 UTC+2

Crystal Palace (The Football Association)	1–0	(Royal Spanish Football Federation) Rayo Vallecano
Mateta 51'	Report

Red Bull Arena, Leipzig
Attendance: 39,176
Referee: Maurizio Mariani (Italy)

Crystal Palace	Rayo Vallecano

GK	1	(England) Dean Henderson (c)
CB	34	(Morocco) Chadi Riad	(yellow card) 82'
CB	5	(France) Maxence Lacroix
CB	23	(France) Jaydee Canvot
RM	2	(Colombia) Daniel Muñoz
CM	20	(England) Adam Wharton	(yellow card) 42'
CM	18	(Japan) Daichi Kamada
LM	3	(England) Tyrick Mitchell
RF	7	(Senegal) Ismaïla Sarr
CF	14	(France) Jean-Philippe Mateta		(substituted off) 76'
LF	10	(Spain) Yéremy Pino	(yellow card) 74'	(substituted off) 80'
Substitutes:
GK	31	(England) Remi Matthews
GK	44	(Argentina) Walter Benítez
DF	17	(England) Nathaniel Clyne
DF	24	(Croatia) Borna Sosa
DF	26	(United States) Chris Richards
DF	59	(Trinidad and Tobago) Rio Cardines
MF	8	(Colombia) Jefferson Lerma
MF	19	(England) Will Hughes
MF	55	(Northern Ireland) Justin Devenny
FW	11	(Wales) Brennan Johnson
FW	22	(Norway) Jørgen Strand Larsen		(substituted on) 76'
FW	29	(Ivory Coast) Evann Guessand		(substituted on) 80'
Manager:
(Austria) Oliver Glasner

GK	13	(Argentina) Augusto Batalla
CB	2	(Romania) Andrei Rațiu
CB	24	(France) Florian Lejeune
CB	3	(Spain) Pep Chavarría
RM	19	(Spain) Jorge de Frutos		(substituted off) 70'
CM	23	(Spain) Óscar Valentín (c)		(substituted off) 62'
CM	6	(Senegal) Pathé Ciss	(yellow card) 20'
CM	17	(Spain) Unai López	(yellow card) 48'	(substituted off) 62'
LM	18	(Spain) Álvaro García	(yellow card) 62'	(substituted off) 70'
SS	7	(Spain) Isi Palazón	(yellow card) 23'	(substituted off) 77'
CF	9	(Brazil) Alemão
Substitutes:
GK	1	(Spain) Daniel Cárdenas
GK	30	(Spain) Adrián Molina
DF	20	(Albania) Iván Balliu
DF	22	(Uruguay) Alfonso Espino	(yellow card) 90+2'	(substituted on) 70'
DF	32	(Senegal) Nobel Mendy	(yellow card) 85'	(substituted on) 62'
MF	4	(Spain) Pedro Díaz		(substituted on) 62'
MF	8	(Argentina) Óscar Trejo
MF	15	(Spain) Gerard Gumbau
FW	10	(Spain) Sergio Camello		(substituted on) 70'
FW	12	(Morocco) Ilias Akhomach		(substituted on) 77'
Manager:
(Spain) Iñigo Pérez

Man of the Match:
Adam Wharton (Crystal Palace)

Assistant referees:
Daniele Bindoni (Italy)
Alberto Tegoni (Italy)
Fourth official:
Glenn Nyberg (Sweden)
Reserve assistant referee:
Mahbod Beigi (Sweden)
Video assistant referee:
Marco Di Bello (Italy)
Assistant video assistant referee:
Daniele Chiffi (Italy)
Support video assistant referee:
Ivan Bebek (Croatia)

Match rules

- 90 minutes
- 30 minutes of extra time if necessary
- Penalty shoot-out if scores still level
- Maximum of twelve named substitutes
- Maximum of five substitutions, with a sixth allowed in extra time
- Maximum of three substitution opportunities, with a fourth allowed in extra time

=== Statistics ===
First half
Statistic	Crystal Palace	Rayo Vallecano
Goals scored	0	0
Total shots	4	2
Shots on target	0	0
Saves	0	0
Ball possession	42%	58%
Corner kicks	2	1
Fouls committed	6	5
Offsides	0	1
Yellow cards	1	2
Red cards	0	0

Second half
Statistic	Crystal Palace	Rayo Vallecano
Goals scored	1	0
Total shots	7	8
Shots on target	3	1
Saves	1	2
Ball possession	43%	57%
Corner kicks	2	0
Fouls committed	10	10
Offsides	1	0
Yellow cards	2	4
Red cards	0	0

Overall
Statistic	Crystal Palace	Rayo Vallecano
Goals scored	1	0
Total shots	11	10
Shots on target	3	1
Saves	1	2
Ball possession	42%	58%
Corner kicks	4	1
Fouls committed	16	15
Offsides	1	1
Yellow cards	3	6
Red cards	0	0

== See also ==
- 2026 UEFA Champions League final
- 2026 UEFA Europa League final
- 2026 UEFA Women's Champions League final
- 2026 UEFA Women's Europa Cup final
- 2026 UEFA Super Cup
