= 2027 UEFA Women's Champions League final =

Football match

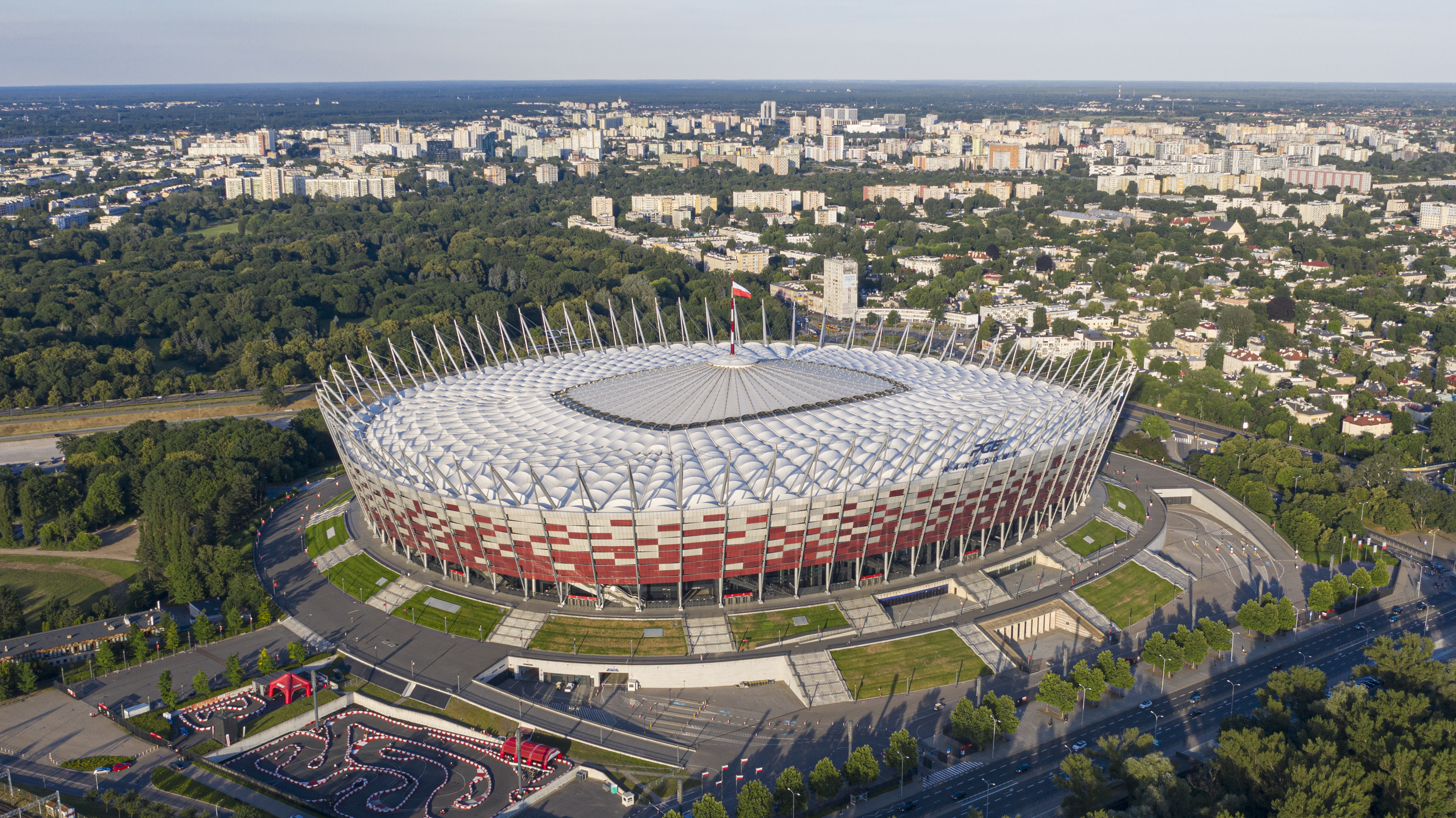
- The Stadion Narodowy in Warsaw will host the final.
- Event: 2026–27 UEFA Women's Champions League
- Date: 28–30 May 2027
- Venue: Stadion Narodowy, Warsaw

The 2027 UEFA Women's Champions League final will be the final match of the 2026–27 UEFA Women's Champions League, the 26th season of Europe's premier women's club football tournament organised by UEFA, and the 18th season since it was renamed from the UEFA Women's Cup to the UEFA Women's Champions League. It will be played at the Stadion Narodowy in Warsaw, Poland, on 28, 29 or 30 May 2027.

The winners will qualify to enter the league phase of the 2027–28 UEFA Women's Champions League, unless they have already qualified for the Champions League through their league performance (in which case the access list will be rebalanced).

== Venue ==
=== Host selection ===
==== First bidding process ====
On 17 May 2023, UEFA opened the bidding process for the final, which was held in parallel with that of the 2026 final. Interested bidders could bid for either one or both of the finals. Additionally, bidding associations could only be appointed one UEFA final in a given year. The proposed venues had to include natural grass and be ranked as a UEFA category four stadium, with a gross capacity of 30,000 to 60,000 preferred. The first bidding timeline was as follows:

- 17 May 2023: Applications formally invited
- 17 July 2023: Closing date for registering intention to bid
- 26 July 2023: Bid requirements made available to bidders
- 15 November 2023: Submission of preliminary bid dossier
- 21 February 2024: Submission of final bid dossier
- 22 May 2024: Appointment of host

UEFA announced on 18 July 2023 that three associations had expressed interest in hosting the 2026 and 2027 finals during the first bidding process.

Bidding associations for 2026 and 2027 UEFA Women's Champions League finals during the first bidding process
Association	Stadium	City	Capacity	Notes
Germany	MHPArena	Stuttgart	54,812	Association also bid for 2026 or 2027 Europa League and 2026 or 2027 Conference League finals (with different venues); Arena AufSchalke in Gelsenkirchen or Allianz Arena in Munich were also included as possible venues prior to official bid submission Association appointed as host of 2027 Europa League final
Norway	Ullevaal Stadion	Oslo	27,182	Stadium also bid for 2026 or 2027 Conference League finals Stadium appointed as host of 2026 Women's Champions League final
Scotland	Hampden Park	Glasgow	51,866	Stadium also bid for 2026 or 2027 Europa League and 2026 or 2027 Conference League finals

The UEFA Executive Committee was originally to appoint the host during their meeting in Dublin, Republic of Ireland, on 22 May 2024. However, as the German Football Association was appointed at the meeting to host the 2027 UEFA Europa League final, the Women's Champions League final bid of Stuttgart could not be considered, and a new bidding process was needed.

==== Second bidding process ====
A second bidding process was opened on 30 September 2024 with the same venue requirements, though associations that already were appointed to host a final in 2027 could not bid. The bidding timeline was as follows:

- 30 September 2024: Applications formally invited
- 21 October 2024: Closing date for registering intention to bid
- 24 October 2024: Bid requirements made available to bidders
- 15 January 2025: Submission of preliminary bid dossier
- 19 March 2025: Submission of final bid dossier
- 11 September 2025: Appointment of host

UEFA announced on 23 October 2024 that four associations had expressed interest in hosting the 2027 final during the second bidding process.

Bidding associations for 2027 UEFA Women's Champions League final during the second bidding process
Association	Stadium	City	Capacity	Notes
Poland	Stadion Narodowy	Warsaw	56,826	
Spain	Camp Nou	Barcelona	105,000 (expected)	Association also bid for 2027 Champions League final (with different venue), for which it was appointed as host
Switzerland	St. Jakob-Park	Basel	37,500	
Wales	Millennium Stadium	Cardiff	73,931	Later decided to defer bid for 2028 or 2029

The UEFA Executive Committee was originally to appoint the host during their meeting in Bilbao, Spain, on 21 May 2025, but it was postponed "for operational reasons" until September 2025. The Stadion Narodowy was selected as the venue by the UEFA Executive Committee during their meeting in Tirana, Albania, on 11 September 2025.

== Match ==
=== Details ===
The winner of semi-final 1 will be designated as the "home" team for administrative purposes.

28–30 May 2027
TBC UTC+2

Winner SF1	v	Winner SF2

Stadion Narodowy, Warsaw

Match rules

- 90 minutes
- 30 minutes of extra time if necessary
- Penalty shoot-out if scores still level
- Maximum of twelve named substitutes
- Maximum of five substitutions, with a sixth allowed in extra time
- Maximum of three substitution opportunities, with a fourth allowed in extra time

== See also ==
- 2027 UEFA Champions League final
- 2027 UEFA Europa League final
- 2027 UEFA Conference League final
