= Crystal Palace F.C. in European football =

English club in European football

- Club: Crystal Palace
- Seasons played: 3
- Most appearances: Adam Wharton (17)
- Top scorer: Ismaïla Sarr (9)
- First entry: 1998 UEFA Intertoto Cup
- Latest entry: 2026–27 UEFA Europa League

Titles
- Conference League: 1 (2026)

Crystal Palace is an English professional football club based in Selhurst, South London. The club has competed three times in UEFA competitions in its history – first in the 1998 UEFA Intertoto Cup, then in the 2025–26 UEFA Conference League, and thirdly in the 2026–27 UEFA Europa League. Additionally, the club has also participated in the minor Anglo-Italian Cup on a number of occasions.

The club won their first European title after defeating Rayo Vallecano 1–0 in the 2026 UEFA Conference League final.

== History ==
=== 1998 UEFA Intertoto Cup ===
At the end of the 1997–98 FA Premier League season, Crystal Palace finished 20th and last in the league, ultimately being relegated to the First Division. However, despite their league position, the club qualified for its first European competition through entering the 1998 UEFA Intertoto Cup. A competition run during the summer period, the Intertoto was poorly regarded in England, primarily due to the disruption it was felt to cause to the pre-season schedule, as well as enmity at UEFA's punishment of Tottenham Hotspur and Wimbledon for fielding weakened sides during the 1995 competition. Having not participated for two years, 1998 was the first back in the competition for English clubs, with Crystal Palace the only one to apply to participate.

Season	Competition	Round	Opposition	Home	Attendance	Away	Attendance	Aggregate
1998	UEFA Intertoto Cup	Third round	(Turkey) Samsunspor	0–2	11,758	0–2	6,000	0–4

=== 2025–26 UEFA Conference League ===
In 2025, Crystal Palace won their first major trophy when they defeated Manchester City in the FA Cup final. This provided the club with a place in the 2025–26 UEFA Europa League. However, at the time, the club's majority owner was American John Textor, who was also the majority owner of French club Lyon. Lyon had also qualified for the Europa League; this potentially led to a breach of UEFA's rules regarding the ownership of multiple clubs by a single individual or entity playing in the same competition. Ultimately, despite Textor selling his stake in the club, Crystal Palace were forced to relinquish their place in the Europa League to Nottingham Forest, who had originally qualified via their final position in the Premier League for the 2025–26 UEFA Conference League, with the two clubs swapping competitions. Palace reached the final of the 2025–26 UEFA Conference League and went on to win 1–0 against Spanish club Rayo Vallecano to claim their first European title.

Season	Competition	Round	Opposition	Home	Attendance	Away	Attendance	Aggregate
2025–26	UEFA Conference League	Play-off round	(Norway) Fredrikstad	1–0	23,013	0–0	10,016	1–0
2025–26	UEFA Conference League	League phase	(Ukraine) Dynamo Kyiv	—N/a	—N/a	2–0	6,839	10th
2025–26	UEFA Conference League	League phase	(Cyprus) AEK Larnaca	0–1	23,038	—N/a	—N/a	10th
2025–26	UEFA Conference League	League phase	(Netherlands) AZ	3–1	21,459	—N/a	—N/a	10th
2025–26	UEFA Conference League	League phase	(France) Strasbourg	—N/a	—N/a	1–2	29,528	10th
2025–26	UEFA Conference League	League phase	(Republic of Ireland) Shelbourne	—N/a	—N/a	3–0	10,134	10th
2025–26	UEFA Conference League	League phase	(Finland) KuPS	2–2	18,049	—N/a	—N/a	10th
2025–26	UEFA Conference League	Knockout phase play-offs	(Bosnia and Herzegovina) Zrinjski Mostar	2–0	21,306	1–1	7,152	3–1
2025–26	UEFA Conference League	Round of 16	(Cyprus) AEK Larnaca	0–0	17,985	2–1 (a.e.t.)	7,019	2–1
2025–26	UEFA Conference League	Quarter-finals	(Italy) Fiorentina	3–0	22,775	1–2	21,045	4–2
2025–26	UEFA Conference League	Semi-finals	(Ukraine) Shakhtar Donetsk	2–1	23,080	3–1	29,842	5–2
2025–26	UEFA Conference League	Final	(Spain) Rayo Vallecano	1–0 (N)			39,176	—N/a

=== 2026–27 UEFA Europa League ===
Following victory in the UEFA Conference League, Crystal Palace qualified for a second successive European campaign by entering the following season's UEFA Europa League via the spot reserved for the Conference League winners.

Season	Competition	Round	Opposition	Home	Attendance	Away	Attendance	Aggregate
2026–27	UEFA Europa League	League phase	(Poland) Lech Poznań	4–0	18,117	—N/a	—N/a	
2026–27	UEFA Europa League	League phase	(France) Lyon	—N/a	—N/a	2–3	40,274	
2026–27	UEFA Europa League	League phase	(Turkey) Beşiktaş	—N/a	—N/a	2–2	38,622	
2026–27	UEFA Europa League	League phase	(Germany) TSG Hoffenheim	1–1	18,741	—N/a	—N/a	
2026–27	UEFA Europa League	League phase	(Spain) Real Sociedad			—N/a	—N/a	
2026–27	UEFA Europa League	League phase	(Poland) Jagiellonia Białystok	—N/a	—N/a			
2026–27	UEFA Europa League	League phase	(Czech Republic) Sparta Prague			—N/a	—N/a	
2026–27	UEFA Europa League	League phase	(Austria) Red Bull Salzburg	—N/a	—N/a			

== Overall record in all UEFA competitions ==
Correct as of match played 17 September 2026, vs (Poland) Lech Poznań

=== Record by competition ===
Competition	Pld	W	D	L	GF	GA	GD	Best performance
UEFA Europa League	1	1	0	0	4	0	+4	League phase (2026–27)
UEFA Conference League	17	10	4	3	27	12	+15	Winners (2025–26)
UEFA Intertoto Cup	2	0	0	2	0	4	−4	Third round (1998)
Total	20	11	4	5	31	16	+15	—

=== Record by nation ===
Nation	Pld	W	D	L	GF	GA	GD	Opponents
Bosnia and Herzegovina	2	1	1	0	3	1	+2	Zrinjski Mostar
Cyprus	3	1	1	1	2	2	0	AEK Larnaca
Finland	1	0	1	0	2	2	0	KuPS
France	1	0	0	1	1	2	−1	Strasbourg
Italy	2	1	0	1	4	2	+2	Fiorentina
Netherlands	1	1	0	0	3	1	+2	AZ
Norway	2	1	1	0	1	0	+1	Fredrikstad
Poland	1	1	0	0	4	0	+4	Lech Poznań
Republic of Ireland	1	1	0	0	3	0	+3	Shelbourne
Spain	1	1	0	0	1	0	+1	Rayo Vallecano
Turkey	2	0	0	2	0	4	−4	Samsunspor
Ukraine	3	3	0	0	7	2	+5	Dynamo Kyiv, Shakhtar Donetsk

=== Record by match ===
Season	Competition	Round	Opposition	Home	Away	Aggregate
1998	UEFA Intertoto Cup	Third round	(Turkey) Samsunspor	0–2	0–2	0–4
2025–26	UEFA Conference League	Play-off round	(Norway) Fredrikstad	1–0	0–0	1–0
2025–26	UEFA Conference League	League phase	(Ukraine) Dynamo Kyiv	—N/a	2–0	10th
2025–26	UEFA Conference League	League phase	(Cyprus) AEK Larnaca	0–1	—N/a	10th
2025–26	UEFA Conference League	League phase	(Netherlands) AZ	3–1	—N/a	10th
2025–26	UEFA Conference League	League phase	(France) Strasbourg	—N/a	1–2	10th
2025–26	UEFA Conference League	League phase	(Republic of Ireland) Shelbourne	—N/a	3–0	10th
2025–26	UEFA Conference League	League phase	(Finland) KuPS	2–2	—N/a	10th
2025–26	UEFA Conference League	Knockout phase play-offs	(Bosnia and Herzegovina) Zrinjski Mostar	2–0	1–1	3–1
2025–26	UEFA Conference League	Round of 16	(Cyprus) AEK Larnaca	0–0	2–1 (a.e.t.)	2–1
2025–26	UEFA Conference League	Quarter-finals	(Italy) Fiorentina	3–0	1–2	4–2
2025–26	UEFA Conference League	Semi-finals	(Ukraine) Shakhtar Donetsk	2–1	3–1	5–2
2025–26	UEFA Conference League	Final	(Spain) Rayo Vallecano	1–0 (N)		
2026–27	UEFA Europa League	League phase	(Poland) Lech Poznań	4–0	—N/a	
2026–27	UEFA Europa League	League phase	(France) Lyon	—N/a	2–3	
2026–27	UEFA Europa League	League phase	(Turkey) Beşiktaş	—N/a	2–2	
2026–27	UEFA Europa League	League phase	(Germany) TSG Hoffenheim	1–1	—N/a	
2026–27	UEFA Europa League	League phase	(Spain) Real Sociedad		—N/a	
2026–27	UEFA Europa League	League phase	(Poland) Jagiellonia Białystok	—N/a		
2026–27	UEFA Europa League	League phase	(Czech Republic) Sparta Prague		—N/a	
2026–27	UEFA Europa League	League phase	(Austria) Red Bull Salzburg	—N/a		

=== UEFA coefficient ===
Rank	Team	Points
86	(Spain) Rayo Vallecano	22.000
87	(Poland) Jagiellonia Białystok	22.000
88	(England) Crystal Palace	21.875
89	(Cyprus) AEK Larnaca	21.750
90	(France) Strasbourg	21.500

Correct as of 28 August 2026

=== European finals ===
Year	Competition	Opposition	Score	Venue
2026	UEFA Conference League	(Spain) Rayo Vallecano	1–0	(Germany) Red Bull Arena, Leipzig

== All-time goalscorers in UEFA competitions ==
The following is a list of Crystal Palace's goalscorers in official UEFA competitions:

- Bold indicates player is still with Crystal Palace
- Correct as of match played 5 November 2026, vs (Germany) TSG Hoffenheim

Rank	Player	Europa League	Conference League	Total
1	(Senegal) **Ismaïla Sarr**	0	9	9
2=	(France) **Jean-Philippe Mateta**	1	3	4
2=	(Spain) **Yéremy Pino**	3	1	4
4=	(England) **Eddie Nketiah**	1	2	3
4=	(Japan) **Daichi Kamada**	2	1	3
6=	(France) Maxence Lacroix	0	2	2
6=	(Norway) **Jørgen Strand Larsen**	1	1	2
6=	(England) **Tyrick Mitchell**	0	2	2
6=	(Nigeria) Christantus Uche	0	2	2
9=	(Northern Ireland) Justin Devenny	0	1	1
9=	(Ivory Coast) **Evann Guessand**	0	1	1
9=	(Colombia) Daniel Muñoz	0	1	1
9=	(United States) **Chris Richards**	1	0	1

== Non-UEFA competitions ==
=== Texaco Cup ===
Season	Competition	Round	Opposition	Home	Attendance	Away	Attendance	Aggregate
1972–73	Texaco Cup	First round	(Scotland) Heart of Midlothian	0–1	9,855	0–1	9,150	**0–2**

=== Anglo-Italian Cup ===
Season	Competition	Round	Opposition	Home	Attendance	Away	Attendance	Aggregate
1971	Anglo-Italian Cup	Group stage	(Italy) Cagliari	1–0	19,326	0–2	30,000	5th
1971	Anglo-Italian Cup	Group stage	(Italy) Inter Milan	1–1	25,152	2–1	28,000	5th
1973	Anglo-Italian Cup	Group stage	(Italy) Hellas Verona	4–1		—N/a	—N/a	1st
1973	Anglo-Italian Cup	Group stage	(Italy) Bari	—N/a	—N/a	1–0		1st
1973	Anglo-Italian Cup	Group stage	(Italy) Lazio	3–1		—N/a	—N/a	1st
1973	Anglo-Italian Cup	Group stage	(Italy) Fiorentina	—N/a	—N/a	2–2		1st
1973	Anglo-Italian Cup	Semi-finals	(England) Newcastle United	0–0		1–5		1–5
1993–94	Anglo-Italian Cup	Preliminary round Group 8	(England) Charlton Athletic	—N/a	—N/a	1–4	3,868	2nd
1993–94	Anglo-Italian Cup	Preliminary round Group 8	(England) Millwall	3–0	2,712	—N/a	—N/a	2nd
