= 2027 UEFA Conference League final =

Football match

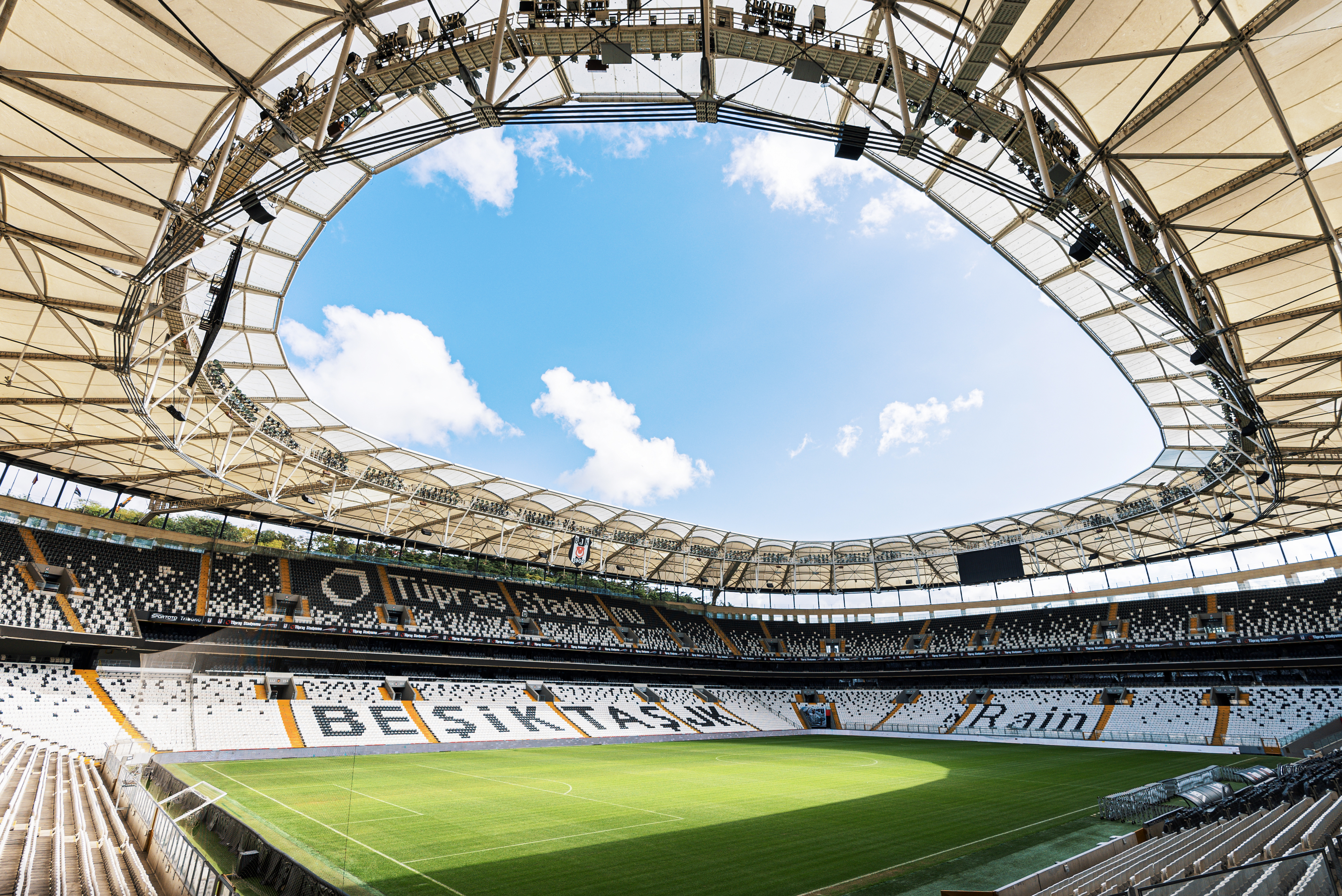
- Beşiktaş Stadium in Istanbul will host the final.
- Event: 2026–27 UEFA Conference League
- Date: 2 June 2027
- Venue: Beşiktaş Stadium, Istanbul

The 2027 UEFA Conference League final will be the final match of the 2026–27 UEFA Conference League, the sixth season of Europe's tertiary club football tournament organised by UEFA, and the third season since it was renamed from the UEFA Europa Conference League to the UEFA Conference League. It will be played at Beşiktaş Stadium in Istanbul, Turkey, on 2 June 2027. However, if the New Ankara Stadium in Ankara is completed on time, the Turkish Football Federation will request UEFA to host the match there.

The winners will qualify to enter the league phase of the 2027–28 UEFA Europa League, unless they have already qualified for the Champions League or Europa League through their league performance (in which case the access list will be rebalanced).

== Venue ==
=== Host selection ===
On 17 May 2023, UEFA opened the bidding process for the final, which was held in parallel with that of the 2026 final. Interested bidders could bid for either one or both of the finals. Additionally, bidding associations could only be appointed one UEFA final in a given year. The proposed venues had to include natural grass and be ranked as a UEFA category four stadium, with a gross capacity of 30,000 to 60,000 preferred. The bidding timeline was as follows:

- 17 May 2023: Applications formally invited
- 17 July 2023: Closing date for registering intention to bid
- 26 July 2023: Bid requirements made available to bidders
- 15 November 2023: Submission of preliminary bid dossier
- 21 February 2024: Submission of final bid dossier
- 22 May 2024: Appointment of host

UEFA announced on 18 July 2023 that six associations had expressed interest in hosting the 2026 and 2027 finals during the first bidding process.

Bidding associations for 2026 and 2027 UEFA Conference League finals
Association	Stadium	City	Capacity	Notes
Germany	Red Bull Arena	Leipzig	45,228	Association also bid for 2026 or 2027 Europa League and 2026 or 2027 Women's Champions League finals (with different venues); Stadium appointed as host of 2026 Conference League final; association appointed as host of 2027 Europa League final
Israel	Teddy Stadium	Jerusalem	31,733	
Norway	Ullevaal Stadion	Oslo	27,182	Stadium also bid for 2026 or 2027 Women's Champions League finals
Scotland	Hampden Park	Glasgow	51,866	Stadium also bid for 2026 or 2027 Europa League and 2026 or 2027 Women's Champions League finals
Switzerland	Stade de Genève	Geneva	30,084	
Turkey	Beşiktaş Stadium	Istanbul	42,684	Stadium also bid for 2026 or 2027 Europa League finals Rams Park or Şükrü Saracoğlu Stadium (both also in Istanbul) were also included as possible venues prior to official bid submission

Beşiktaş Stadium was selected as the venue by the UEFA Executive Committee during their meeting in Dublin, Republic of Ireland, on 22 May 2024. This will be the second European final to take place at Beşiktaş Stadium, having hosted the previous season's Europa League final. After discussions with stakeholders, the Turkish Football Federation decided to request UEFA to instead host the final at the New Ankara Stadium in Ankara, which is currently under construction. However, this is contingent on the stadium's completion in time.

== Match ==
=== Details ===
The winner of semi-final 1 will be designated as the "home" team for administrative purposes.

2 June 2027
22:00 UTC+3

Winner SF1	v	Winner SF2

Beşiktaş Stadium, Istanbul

Match rules

- 90 minutes
- 30 minutes of extra time if necessary
- Penalty shoot-out if scores still level
- Maximum of twelve named substitutes
- Maximum of five substitutions, with a sixth allowed in extra time
- Maximum of three substitution opportunities, with a fourth allowed in extra time

== See also ==
- 2027 UEFA Champions League final
- 2027 UEFA Europa League final
- 2027 UEFA Women's Champions League final
