= 2026 UEFA Women's Champions League final =

Football match in Oslo, Norway

- Event: 2025–26 UEFA Women's Champions League
Barcelona	OL Lyonnes
(Spain)	(France)
4	0
- Date: 23 May 2026
- Venue: Ullevaal Stadion, Oslo
- Player of the Match: Ewa Pajor (Barcelona)
- Referee: Tess Olofsson (Sweden)
- Attendance: 24,258
- Weather: Sunny; 21 °C (70 °F); 45% humidity

The 2026 UEFA Women's Champions League final was the final match of the 2025–26 UEFA Women's Champions League, the 25th season of Europe's premier women's club football tournament organised by UEFA, and the 17th season since it was renamed from the UEFA Women's Cup to the UEFA Women's Champions League. It was played at the Ullevaal Stadion in Oslo, Norway, on 23 May 2026 between Spanish club Barcelona and French club OL Lyonnes.

Barcelona won the match 4–0 for their fourth UEFA Women's Champions League title. As winners, they qualified for the 2027 FIFA Women's Champions Cup semi-finals. As they had already qualified for the and 2028 FIFA Women's Club World Cup by winning the same tournament in 2024, the spot intended for the winners was redistributed via the UEFA club ranking. With the win, they completed their second continental quadruple.

== Background ==
Barcelona reached their seventh UEFA Women's Cup/Women's Champions League final overall and sixth consecutively, winning in 2021, 2023, and 2024 while losing in 2019, 2022, and 2025.

OL Lyonnes reached their record-extending twelfth UEFA Women's Cup/Women's Champions League final, having won a record eight titles in 2011, 2012, 2016, 2017, 2018, 2019, 2020, and 2022 while losing in 2010, 2013, and 2024.

The clubs have previously met in three finals; in 2019, 2022, and 2024. The first two were won by OL Lyonnes, while the most recent was won by Barcelona. This final marked a record-equaling fourth UEFA Women's Cup/Women's Champions League final between the same two sides, matching the previous record of finals contested by OL Lyonnes and Wolfsburg.

=== Previous finals ===
In the following table, finals until 2009 were in the UEFA Women's Cup era, since 2010 were in the UEFA Women's Champions League era.

Team	Previous finals appearances (bold indicates winners)
(Spain) Barcelona	6 (2019, **2021**, 2022, **2023**, **2024**, 2025)
(France) OL Lyonnes	11 (2010, **2011**, **2012**, 2013, **2016**, **2017**, **2018**, **2019**, **2020**, **2022**, 2024)

== Venue ==
=== Host selection ===
On 17 May 2023, UEFA opened the bidding process for the final, which was held in parallel with that of the 2027 final. Interested bidders could bid for either one or both of the finals. Additionally, bidding associations could only be appointed one UEFA final in a given year. The proposed venues had to include natural grass and be ranked as a UEFA category four stadium, with a gross capacity of 30,000 to 60,000 preferred. The bidding timeline was as follows:

- 17 May 2023: Applications formally invited
- 17 July 2023: Closing date for registering intention to bid
- 26 July 2023: Bid requirements made available to bidders
- 15 November 2023: Submission of preliminary bid dossier
- 21 February 2024: Submission of final bid dossier
- 22 May 2024: Appointment of host

UEFA announced on 18 July 2023 that three associations had expressed interest in hosting the 2026 and 2027 finals during the first bidding process.

Bidding associations for 2026 and 2027 UEFA Women's Champions League finals
Association	Stadium	City	Capacity	Notes
Germany	MHPArena	Stuttgart	54,812	Association also bid for 2026 or 2027 Europa League and 2026 or 2027 Conference League finals (with different venues); Arena AufSchalke in Gelsenkirchen or Allianz Arena in Munich were also included as possible venues prior to official bid submission Association appointed as host for 2026 Conference League final
Norway	Ullevaal Stadion	Oslo	27,182	Stadium also bid for 2026 or 2027 Conference League finals
Scotland	Hampden Park	Glasgow	51,866	Stadium also bid for 2026 or 2027 Europa League and 2026 or 2027 Conference League finals

Ullevaal Stadion was selected as the venue by the UEFA Executive Committee during their meeting in Dublin, Republic of Ireland, on 22 May 2024.

== Route to the final ==
Note: In all results below, the score of the finalist is given first (H: home; A: away). Data sourced from

(Spain) Barcelona				Round	(France) OL Lyonnes			
Opponent	Result			League phase	Opponent	Result		
(Germany) Bayern Munich	7–1 (H)			Matchday 1	(England) Arsenal	2–1 (A)		
(Italy) Roma	4–0 (A)			Matchday 2	(Austria) St. Pölten	3–0 (H)		
(Belgium) OH Leuven	3–0 (H)			Matchday 3	(Germany) VfL Wolfsburg	3–1 (H)		
(England) Chelsea	1–1 (A)			Matchday 4	(Italy) Juventus	3–3 (A)		
(Portugal) Benfica	3–1 (H)			Matchday 5	(England) Manchester United	3–0 (A)		
(France) Paris FC	2–0 (A)			Matchday 6	(Spain) Atlético Madrid	4–0 (H)		
1st place Advanced to quarter-finals				Final position	2nd place Advanced to quarter-finals			
Opponent	Agg.	1st leg	2nd leg	Knockout phase	Opponent	Agg.	1st leg	2nd leg
(Spain) Real Madrid	12–2	6–2 (A)	6–0 (H)	Quarter-finals	(Germany) VfL Wolfsburg	4–1	0–1 (A)	4–0 (a.e.t.) (H)
(Germany) Bayern Munich	5–3	1–1 (A)	4–2 (H)	Semi-finals	(England) Arsenal	4–3	1–2 (A)	3–1 (H)

== Match ==
=== Summary ===
In the first half OL Lyonnes threatened the Barcelona goal a number of times, and after 15 minutes scored a goal through Lindsey Heaps which was disallowed by VAR for offside. For Barcelona, Ewa Pajor then had a shot on goal which narrowly went wide. In the second half Barcelona took control, and in the 55th minute Pajor scored the opening goal when she ran on to a pass from Patri Guijarro and struck a left-footed shot past goalkeeper Christiane Endler. 14 minutes later, Pajor doubled the lead for Barcelona by converting a cross from Salma Paralluelo. OL Lyonnes tried to fight back, and Barcelona goalkeeper Cata Coll kept out a shot from Vicki Becho before preventing Tabitha Chawinga from converting when she had only Coll to beat. With the game almost over, Barcelona scored twice more through two goals from Paralluelo; the first with a long shot, before a break resulted in her being left with only the goalkeeper to beat. Barcelona thus regained the trophy that they had lost to Arsenal in 2025.

=== Details ===
The winners of semi-final 1 (Barcelona) was designated as the "home" team for administrative purposes.

23 May 2026
18:00 UTC+2

Barcelona (Spain)	4–0	(France) OL Lyonnes
Pajor 55', 69'; Paralluelo 90', 90+3'	Report

Ullevaal Stadion, Oslo
Attendance: 24,258
Referee: Tess Olofsson (Sweden)

Barcelona	OL Lyonnes

GK	13	(Spain) Cata Coll	(yellow card) 88'
RB	22	(Spain) Ona Batlle
CB	2	(Spain) Irene Paredes
CB	4	(Spain) Mapi León
LB	24	(Netherlands) Esmee Brugts		(substituted off) 85'
RM	16	(Spain) Clara Serrajordi		(substituted off) 72'
CM	12	(Spain) Patricia Guijarro
LM	11	(Spain) Alexia Putellas (c)	(yellow card) 68'	(substituted off) 85'
RF	10	(Norway) Caroline Graham Hansen		(substituted off) 62'
CF	17	(Poland) Ewa Pajor
LF	7	(Spain) Salma Paralluelo
Substitutes:
GK	1	(Spain) Gemma Font
GK	37	(Spain) Txell Font
DF	8	(Spain) Marta Torrejón
DF	23	(Spain) Aïcha Cámara		(substituted on) 85'
DF	40	(Spain) Adriana Ranera
DF	43	(Spain) Carla Julià
MF	6	(Switzerland) Sydney Schertenleib
MF	14	(Spain) Aitana Bonmatí		(substituted on) 72'
MF	19	(Spain) Vicky López
FW	9	(Spain) Clàudia Pina		(substituted on) 62'
FW	18	(Portugal) Kika Nazareth		(substituted on) 85'
FW	35	(Norway) Martine Fenger
Manager:
(Spain) Pere Romeu

GK	1	(Chile) Christiane Endler
RB	12	(Canada) Ashley Lawrence
CB	3	(France) Wendie Renard (c)
CB	15	(Norway) Ingrid Syrstad Engen
LB	4	(France) Selma Bacha
DM	10	(United States) Lindsey Heaps
CM	6	(Haiti) Melchie Dumornay	(yellow card) 73'
CM	20	(United States) Lily Yohannes		(substituted off) 72'
RF	7	(France) Vicki Bècho		(substituted off) 66'
CF	14	(Norway) Ada Hegerberg		(substituted off) 66'
LF	29	(Germany) Jule Brand
Substitutes:
GK	16	(France) Féerine Belhadj
GK	56	(France) Lou Marchal
DF	18	(France) Alice Sombath
DF	23	(Denmark) Sofie Svava
DF	33	(Brazil) Tarciane
DF	36	(France) Romane Rafalski
MF	8	(United States) Korbin Shrader		(substituted on) 72'
MF	13	(Netherlands) Damaris Egurrola
MF	17	(France) Maïssa Fathallah
MF	25	(France) Inès Benyahia
FW	9	(France) Marie-Antoinette Katoto		(substituted on) 66'
FW	22	(Malawi) Tabitha Chawinga		(substituted on) 66'
Manager:
(Spain) Jonatan Giráldez

Player of the Match:
Ewa Pajor (Barcelona)

Assistant referees:
Almira Spahić (Sweden)
Monica Løkkeberg (Norway)
Fourth official:
Iuliana Demetrescu (Romania)
Reserve assistant referee:
Tilde Hedberg (Sweden)
Video assistant referee:
Bram Van Driessche (Belgium)
Assistant video assistant referee:
Fedayi San (Switzerland)
Support video assistant referee:
Michael Fabbri (Italy)

Match rules

- 90 minutes
- 30 minutes of extra time if necessary
- Penalty shoot-out if scores still level
- Maximum of twelve named substitutes
- Maximum of five substitutions, with a sixth allowed in extra time
- Maximum of three substitution opportunities, with a fourth allowed in extra time

=== Statistics ===
First half
Statistic	Barcelona	OL Lyonnes
Goals scored	0	0
Total shots	5	8
Shots on target	0	2
Saves	2	0
Ball possession	44%	56%
Corner kicks	1	3
Fouls committed	10	3
Offsides	1	2
Yellow cards	0	0
Red cards	0	0

Second half
Statistic	Barcelona	OL Lyonnes
Goals scored	4	0
Total shots	7	6
Shots on target	5	2
Saves	2	1
Ball possession	56%	44%
Corner kicks	1	3
Fouls committed	4	4
Offsides	0	1
Yellow cards	2	1
Red cards	0	0

Overall
Statistic	Barcelona	OL Lyonnes
Goals scored	4	0
Total shots	12	14
Shots on target	5	4
Saves	4	1
Ball possession	50%	50%
Corner kicks	2	6
Fouls committed	14	7
Offsides	1	3
Yellow cards	2	1
Red cards	0	0

== See also ==
- 2026 UEFA Women's Europa Cup final
- 2026 UEFA Champions League final
- 2026 UEFA Europa League final
- 2026 UEFA Conference League final
- 2026 UEFA Super Cup
