= Kush Democratic Majority Party =

Political party in South Sudan

- Leader: Bol Gai Deng
- Ideology: Conservatism; Pan-Africanism; Civic nationalism; Federalism
- Political position: Centre-right
- Slogan: Unity is our aim, Victory is our destiny!
- National Legislative Assembly: 0 / 170

Website
- kushdemocraticmajority.com

The Kush Democratic Majority Party is a political party in South Sudan led by Bol Gai Deng.
