= Ministry of Humanitarian Affairs and Disaster Management (South Sudan) =

Government ministry of South Sudan

South Sudan Ministry of Humanitarian Affairs and Disaster Management
Department overview
- Formed: 2011
- Jurisdiction: South Sudan
- Headquarters: Juba
- Minister responsible: Hon. Albino Akol Atak Mayom, Minister of Humanitarian Affairs and Disaster Management

The Ministry of Humanitarian Affairs and Disaster Management is a ministry of the Government of South Sudan. The incumbent minister is Hon. Albino Akol Atak Mayom as of January 2023.

== List of ministers of humanitarian affairs and disaster management ==
Minister	In office	Party	President	Note(s)
Hon. Albino Akol Atak Mayom	Since 2023	African National Congress (South Sudan)	Salva Kiir	In office
