= Bol Gai Deng =

South Sudanese activist and politician

Personal details
- Born: c. 1980 Democratic Republic of Sudan
- Party: Kush Democratic Majority Party
- Education: Virginia Commonwealth University
- Profession: Politician, author, human rights activist

Bol Gai Deng is a South Sudanese human rights activist, author, and politician whose work and public profile have been covered by U.S. and international media and institutions. He leads the Kush Democratic Majority Party and has announced campaigns for the presidency of South Sudan from the United States in recent election cycles.

== Early life ==
Bol Gai Deng was born into the Dinka tribe what is now South Sudan. He was kidnapped from his village at the age of seven, enslaved for four years, and eventually escaped to Egypt before resettling in the United States as a refugee.

== Education and activism ==
Deng studied at Virginia Commonwealth University (VCU), where coverage notes a course of study in political science and homeland security and describes his subsequent human rights advocacy, including organizing rallies in Washington, D.C., and outreach among refugee and immigrant communities.

== Politics ==
Deng is the leader of the Kush Democratic Majority Party and has campaigned for the presidency of South Sudan, with reporting describing his U.S.-based efforts to press for free and fair elections and to promote peace and humanitarian priorities.

== Publications ==
Deng is the author of Bol Gai Deng: Legacy of an African Freedom Fighter, a work discussed in institutional coverage of his activism and campaign.
