= 2027 UEFA Europa League final =

Football match

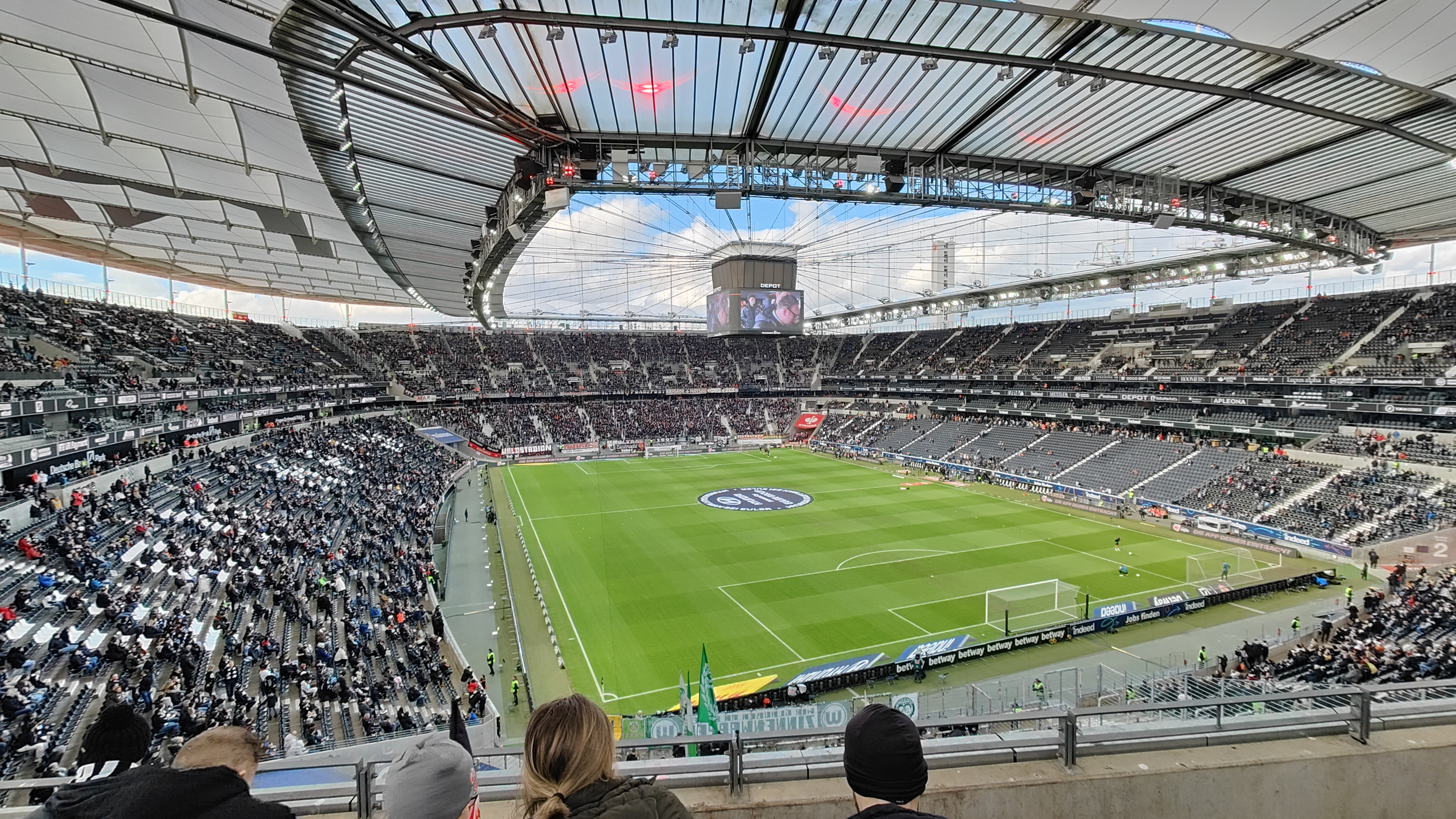
- The Frankfurt Arena in Frankfurt will host the final.
- Event: 2026–27 UEFA Europa League
- Date: 26 May 2027
- Venue: Frankfurt Arena, Frankfurt

The 2027 UEFA Europa League final will be the final match of the 2026–27 UEFA Europa League, the 56th season of Europe's secondary club football tournament organised by UEFA, and the 18th season since it was renamed from the UEFA Cup to the UEFA Europa League. It will be played at the FrankFurt Arena in Frankfurt, Germany, on 26 May 2027.

The winners will earn the right to play against the winners of the 2026–27 UEFA Champions League in the 2027 UEFA Super Cup. The winners will also qualify to enter the league phase of the 2027–28 UEFA Champions League, unless they have already qualified for the Champions League through their league performance (in which case the access list will be rebalanced).

== Venue ==
=== Host selection ===
On 17 May 2023, UEFA opened the bidding process for the final, which was held in parallel with that of the 2026 final. Interested bidders could bid for either one or both of the finals. Additionally, bidding associations could only be appointed one UEFA final in a given year. The proposed venues had to include natural grass and be ranked as a UEFA category four stadium, with a gross capacity of 40,000 to 60,000 preferred. The bidding timeline was as follows:

- 17 May 2023: Applications formally invited
- 17 July 2023: Closing date for registering intention to bid
- 26 July 2023: Bid requirements made available to bidders
- 15 November 2023: Submission of preliminary bid dossier
- 21 February 2024: Submission of final bid dossier
- 22 May 2024: Appointment of host

UEFA announced on 18 July 2023 that four associations had expressed interest in hosting the 2026 and 2027 finals during the first bidding process.

Bidding associations for 2026 and 2027 UEFA Europa League finals
| Association | Stadium | City | Capacity | Notes |
|---|---|---|---|---|
| Germany | Frankfurt Arena | Frankfurt | 53,800 | Association also bid for 2026 or 2027 Conference League and 2026 or 2027 Women's Champions League finals (with different venues); Merkur Spiel-Arena in Düsseldorf, Arena AufSchalke in Gelsenkirchen, Red Bull Arena in Leipzig or MHPArena in Stuttgart were also included as possible venues prior to official bid submission |
| Romania | Arena Națională | Bucharest | 55,634 | |
| Scotland | Hampden Park | Glasgow | 51,866 | Stadium also bid for 2026 or 2027 Conference League and 2026 or 2027 Women's Champions League finals |
| Turkey | Beşiktaş Stadium | Istanbul | 42,684 | Stadium also bid for 2026 or 2027 Conference League finals Rams Park or Şükrü Saracoğlu Stadium (both also in Istanbul) were also included as possible venues prior to official bid submission Stadium appointed as host of 2026 Europa League final and 2027 Conference League final |

The Waldstadion was selected as the venue by the UEFA Executive Committee during their meeting in Dublin, Republic of Ireland, on 22 May 2024.

== Match ==
=== Details ===
The winner of semi-final 1 will be designated as the "home" team for administrative purposes.

26 May 2027
21:00 UTC+2

| Winner SF1 | v | Winner SF2 |

Frankfurt Arena, Frankfurt

Match rules

- 90 minutes
- 30 minutes of extra time if necessary
- Penalty shoot-out if scores still level
- Maximum of twelve named substitutes
- Maximum of five substitutions, with a sixth allowed in extra time
- Maximum of three substitution opportunities, with a fourth allowed in extra time

== See also ==
- 2027 UEFA Champions League final
- 2027 UEFA Conference League final
- 2027 UEFA Women's Champions League final
