= 2027 UEFA Champions League final =

Football match in Madrid, Spain

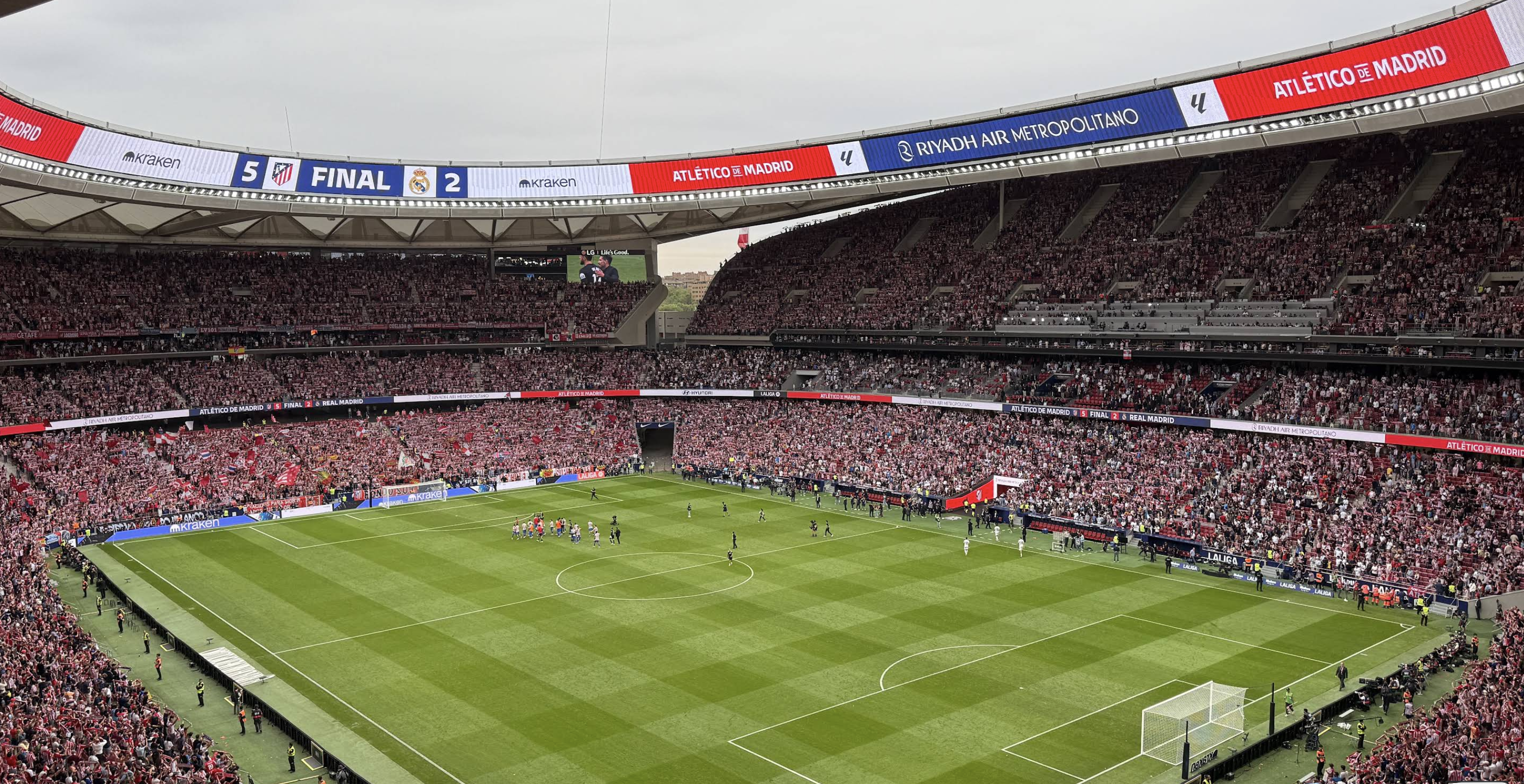
- The Metropolitano Stadium in Madrid will host the final.
- Event: 2026–27 UEFA Champions League
- Date: 5 June 2027
- Venue: Estadio Metropolitano, Madrid

The 2027 UEFA Champions League final will be the final match of the 2026–27 UEFA Champions League, the 72nd season of Europe's premier club football tournament organised by UEFA, and the 35th season since it was renamed from the European Champion Clubs' Cup to the UEFA Champions League. It will be played at the Estadio Metropolitano in Madrid, Spain, on 5 June 2027.

The winners will earn the right to play against the winners of the 2026–27 UEFA Europa League in the 2027 UEFA Super Cup, compete in the final of the 2027 FIFA Intercontinental Cup, and qualify for the 2029 FIFA Club World Cup. The winners will also qualify to enter the league phase of the 2027–28 UEFA Champions League, unless they have already qualified for the Champions League through their league performance (in which case the access list will be rebalanced).

== Venue ==
=== Host selection ===
==== First bidding process ====
On 17 May 2023, UEFA opened the bidding process for the 2027 final, which was held in parallel with that of the 2026 final. Interested bidders could bid for either one or both of the finals. Additionally, bidding associations could only be appointed one UEFA final in a given year. The proposed venues had to include natural grass and be ranked as a UEFA category four stadium, with a gross capacity of at least 70,000 preferred. The first bidding timeline was as follows:

- 17 May 2023: Applications formally invited
- 17 July 2023: Closing date for registering intention to bid
- 26 July 2023: Bid requirements made available to bidders
- 15 November 2023: Submission of preliminary bid dossier
- 21 February 2024: Submission of final bid dossier
- 22 May 2024: Appointment of host

UEFA announced on 18 July 2023 that three associations had expressed interest in hosting the 2026 and 2027 finals during the first bidding process.

Bidding associations for 2026 and 2027 UEFA Champions League finals during the first bidding process
Association	Stadium	City	Capacity	Notes
Hungary	Puskás Aréna	Budapest	67,215	Stadium appointed as host of 2026 Champions League final
Italy	San Siro	Milan	75,817	

The UEFA Executive Committee suspended the decision on the host appointment during their meeting in Dublin, Republic of Ireland, on 22 May 2024. This delay allowed the Italian Football Federation to submit additional information on the refurbishment plans for the San Siro in Milan. At the subsequent Executive Committee meeting in Prague, Czech Republic, on 24 September 2024, the San Siro was not selected to host the final. This decision was made because the municipality of Milan could not guarantee that refurbishment works would not affect the stadium and its surroundings during the final. Consequently, UEFA opted to open a new bidding process for the final.

==== Second bidding process ====
A second bidding process was opened on 30 September 2024 with the same venue requirements, though associations that already were appointed to host a final in 2027 could not bid. The bidding timeline was as follows:

- 30 September 2024: Applications formally invited
- 21 October 2024: Closing date for registering intention to bid
- 24 October 2024: Bid requirements made available to bidders
- 15 January 2025: Submission of preliminary bid dossier
- 19 March 2025: Submission of final bid dossier
- 11 September 2025: Appointment of host

UEFA announced on 23 October 2024 that two associations had expressed interest in hosting the 2027 final during the second bidding process.

Bidding associations for 2027 UEFA Champions League final during the second bidding process
Association	Stadium	City	Capacity	Notes
Azerbaijan	Olympic Stadium	Baku	69,870	
Spain	Estadio Metropolitano	Madrid	70,692	Association also bid for 2027 Women's Champions League final (with different venue)

The UEFA Executive Committee was originally to appoint the host during their meeting in Bilbao, Spain, on 21 May 2025, but it was postponed "for operational reasons" until September 2025. The Estadio Metropolitano was selected as the venue by the UEFA Executive Committee during their meeting in Tirana, Albania, on 11 September 2025. This will be the second time the Metropolitano will be hosting the final since having previously done so in 2019.

== Match ==
=== Details ===
The winner of semi-final 1 will be designated as the "home" team for administrative purposes.

5 June 2027
18:00 UTC+2

Winner SF1	v	Winner SF2

Estadio Metropolitano, Madrid

Match rules

- 90 minutes
- 30 minutes of extra time if necessary
- Penalty shoot-out if scores still level
- Maximum of twelve named substitutes
- Maximum of five substitutions, with a sixth allowed in extra time
- Maximum of three substitution opportunities, with a fourth allowed in extra time

== See also ==
- 2027 UEFA Europa League final
- 2027 UEFA Conference League final
- 2027 UEFA Women's Champions League final
