= Arthur Bar =

French footballer (born 2010)

Personal information
- Date of birth: 25 January 2010 (age 16)
- Place of birth: Paris, France
- Position: Goalkeeper

Team information
- Current team: PSG
- Number: 90

Youth career
- –2022: MMFC
- 2022–2024: CO Vincennes
- 2024–: PSG

Senior career*
Years	Team	Apps	(Gls)
2026–	PSG	0	(0)

International career^{‡}
2025	France U15	3	(0)
- * Club domestic league appearances and goals ‡ National team caps and goals as of 18 May 2025

Arthur Bar (born 25 January 2010) is a French footballer who plays as a goalkeeper for PSG.

== Early life ==
Bar was born on 25 January 2010. Born in Paris, France, he is a native of the city.

== Club career ==
As a youth player, Bar joined the youth academy of MMFC. Following his stint there, he joined the youth academy of CO Vincennes in 2022.

Ahead of the 2024–25 season, he joined the youth academy of Ligue 1 side PSG, helping the club's under-17 team win the league title. On 3 November 2026, he was first called up to their senior team during a 6–0 home win over Villarreal in the UEFA Champions League.

== International career ==
Bar is a France youth international and has represented the country internationally at under-15 level. On 14 February 2025, he debuted for the France national under-15 football team during a 2–1 home friendly win over the Wales national under-15 football team.

== Style of play ==
Bar plays as a goalkeeper. French newspaper L'Équipe wrote in 2026 that he is "a player whose athletic abilities – he's over 1.95m tall – are impressive".
