= Alessandro Longoni =

Italian footballer (born 2008)

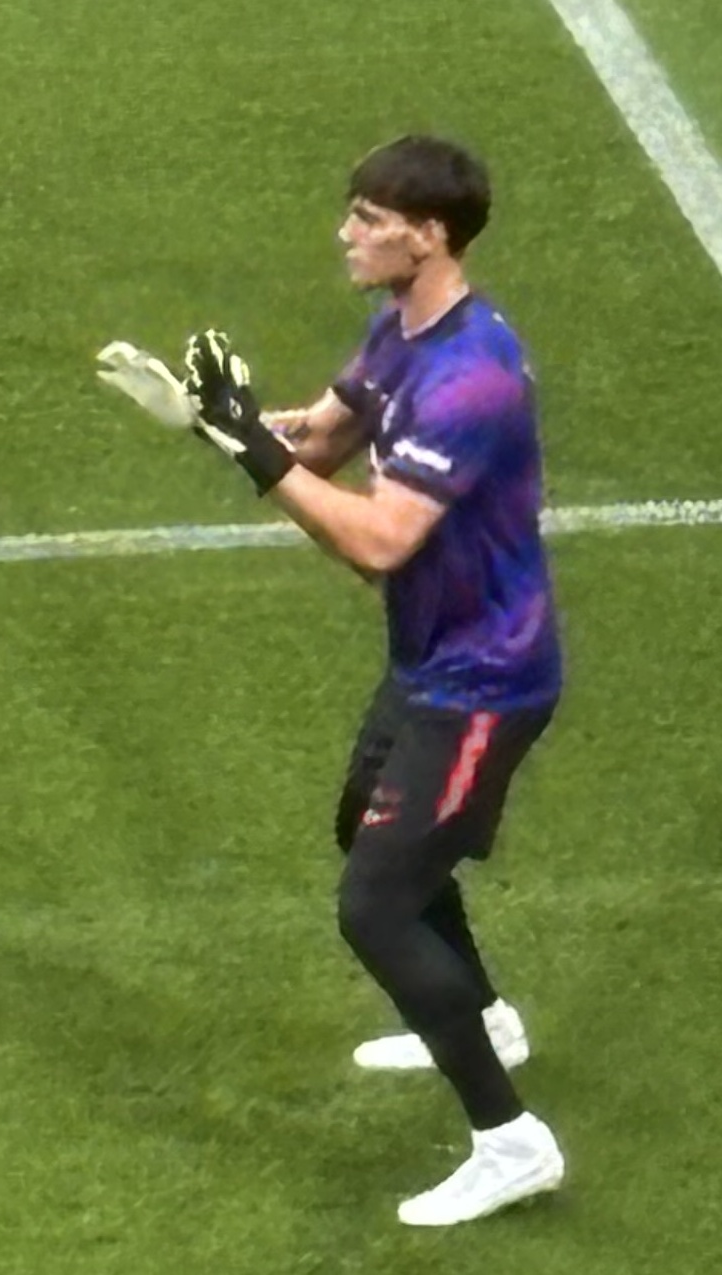
- Longoni with Paris Saint-Germain in 2026

Personal information
- Date of birth: 30 January 2008 (age 18)
- Place of birth: Como, Italy
- Height: 1.92 m (6 ft 4 in)
- Position: Goalkeeper

Team information
- Current team: Paris Saint-Germain
- Number: 16

Youth career
- 2017–2026: AC Milan
- 2026–: Paris Saint-Germain

Senior career*
Years	Team	Apps	(Gls)
2025–2026	Milan Futuro	1	(0)
2026–	Paris Saint-Germain	0	(0)

International career^{‡}
2022–2023	Italy U15	7	(0)
2023	Italy U16	4	(0)
2024–2025	Italy U17	20	(0)
2025–	Italy U18	6	(0)
Medal record
Men's football
Representing Italy
UEFA European Under-17 Championship
Winner	2024 Cyprus
FIFA U-17 World Cup
Third place	2025 Qatar
- * Club domestic league appearances and goals as of 23:55, 12 April 2026 (UTC) ‡ National team caps and goals as of 23:45, 31 March 2026 (UTC)

Alessandro Longoni (born 31 January 2008) is an Italian professional footballer who plays as a goalkeeper for Ligue 1 club Paris Saint-Germain.

== Club career ==
=== AC Milan ===
Born in Como, Longoni started playing football when he was 9, and is a youth product of AC Milan.

On 17 September 2025, he was called up with AC Milan's reserve team during the 2–2 home draw Serie D match against Leon, as an unused substitute however. Some months later, at the closing of the 2025–26 season, Longoni made his professional debut with Milan Futuro substituting Lorenzo Torriani at the second half of a 4–0 away win Serie D match against Brusaporto, on 12 April 2026.

=== Paris Saint-Germain ===
During the end of the 2025–26 season, top-flight clubs showed interest in recruiting him as a free agent, including English Premier League club Manchester City, and French Ligue 1 club Paris Saint-Germain, ahead of the 2026–27 season. On 29 June 2026, Longoni agreed to join Paris Saint-Germain, signing a contract until 2031 on 6 July.

During his first season with the club he went on to initially feature with the U19s in the Championnat National U19, and the Espoirs at the 2026–27 Premier League International Cup.

== International career ==
He is an Italy youth international, having featured with the under-15, under-16, under-17 and under-18 teams.

With the U17 side he won the 2024 UEFA European Under-17 Championship, and finished in third place at the 2025 FIFA U-17 World Cup.

== Career statistics ==
As of match played 8 November 2026

Appearances and goals by club, season and competition
Club	Season	League			National cup		Europe		Other		Total	
Club	Season	Division	Apps	Goals	Apps	Goals	Apps	Goals	Apps	Goals	Apps	Goals
Milan Futuro	2025–26	Serie D	1	0	—		—		0	0	1	0
Paris Saint-Germain	2026–27	Ligue 1	0	0	0	0	0	0	0	0	0	0
Paris Saint-Germain Espoirs	2026–27	Challenge Espoirs	0	0	0	0	—		1 (Note: Appearance in 2026–27 Premier League International Cup)	0	1	0
Career total			1	0	0	0	0	0	1	0	2	0

== Honours ==
Italy U17

- UEFA European Under-17 Championship: 2024
- FIFA U-17 World Cup third place: 2025
