= Doomsday Brothers =

Canadian adult animated sitcom

- Genre: Animated sitcom
- Created by: Alain Dagenais; Liliana Reyes; Willem Wennekers
- Developed by: Willem Wennekers; Alain Dagenais; Liliana Reyes
- Directed by: Suren Perera
- Voices of: Phil Roy; Pier-Luc Funk; Guylaine Tremblay; Rémi-Pierre Paquin; Catherine-Anne Toupin; Rebecca Makonnen; Julien Poulin; Sarah-Jeanne Labrosse; Hugolin Chevrette; Bruno Landry; Benoît Rousseau; Johanne Léveillé; Frédérik Zacharek
- Composer: Florian Chabillon
- Country of origin: Canada
- Original languages: English; French
- No. of seasons: 1
- No. of episodes: 18

Production
- Executive producers: Alain Dagenais; Joy Rosen; Lisa Olfman; Willem Wennekers
- Running time: 22 minutes
- Production companies: Portfolio Entertainment; N12 Productions; Corus Entertainment

Original release
- Network: Télétoon la nuit(Quebec French); Adult Swim(Canadian English)
- Release: September 17, 2020 – March 4, 2021

Doomsday Brothers (original French-language title: Les Frères Apocalypse) is a Canadian adult animated sitcom created by Alain Dagenais, Liliana Reyes and Willem Wennekers that premiered on the Télétoon's Télétoon la nuit block on September 17, 2020, for its French version, and on Adult Swim on September 20, 2020, for its English version. The series follows two brothers who live in an apocalyptic world alongside creatures and mutants. The series was produced by Portfolio Entertainment and N12 Productions and was animated in Flash animation. In the United States, the series was released on Tubi on August 20, 2023. 18 episodes of the series were produced.

== Cast ==
- Raph Brûlé/Rafe Burns – Phil Roy (French), Josh Graham (English)
- Gab Brûlé/Gabe Burns – Pier-Luc Funk (French), Robert Tinkler (English)
- Judith Brûlé/Judith Burns – Guylaine Tremblay (French), Julie Lemieux (English)
- Dave Bisson/Dwayne – Rémi-Pierre Paquin (French), Ron Pardo (English)
- Vince/Vijay Ramcharan – Hugolin Chevrette (French), Ali Badshah (English)
- Danika Bisson/Danika – Sarah-Jeanne Labrosse (French), Ana Sani (English)
- Ana Harvey – Rebecca Makonnen (French), Nicole Stamp (English)
- Father Manilla – Julien Poulin (French), Cory Doran (English)
- Suzette Ste-Croix/Suzette – Catherine-Anne Toupin (French), Stacey DePass (English)
- Johnny – Bruno Landry (French), Cory Doran (English)
- AENUS – Benoît Rousseau (French), Ned Petrie (English)
- Humunga – Johanne Léveillé (French), Nicole Stamp (English)
- Manson – Hugolin Chevrette (French), Cory Doran (English)
- Johndoe – Frédérik Zacharek (French), Ron Pardo (English)
- General Hecks – Josh Graham
- Bryce – Robert Tinkler
- Dr Sophia Ion

== Episodes ==
No.	Title	Directed by	Written by	French air date	English air date
1	"Daughter of Humunga" (La fille d'Humunga)	Suren Perera	Willem Wennekers	September 17, 2020	September 20, 2020
In an apocalypic world, two brothers, Gabe and Rafe, are protectors of their town. The mayor's daughter runs away with a bunch of Amazonian giant mutant women and the brothers go rescue her. While this happens, Judith, the brothers' mother, stuck in a super bunker called AENUS attempts to escape through the vents.
2	"The Real Monster is... You!" (Full métal moron)	Suren Perera	Story by : Daniel Gagnon and Doug Sinclair; Teleplay by : Doug Sinclair	September 24, 2020	September 27, 2020
A rocker mutant named Manson and his roadies take over the town and cause havoc for everyone. Judith attempts another escape by re-wiring AENUS only to set destructive security drones on herself.
3	"Flowers for Chudley" (Des roses blanches pour mon chien lette)	Suren Perera	Doug Sinclair	October 1, 2020	October 4, 2020
Chudley, Rafe's mutated dog changes bodies with Gabe. Mayor Dwayne enjoys getting Hallucinations on Johnny's tears. Judith finds a classified filing cabinet with classified military secrets but finds someone by the name of Johndoe Coprety who survived the explosion.
4	"Two Boys and their Poor Poor Dog" (Deux hommes et un pauv’ chien)	Suren Perera	Robin J. Stein	October 8, 2020	October 11, 2020
Gabe and Rafe are recruited by the Giant mutant amazonian girls to get it on with their giant (even bigger) queen but screw it up and get help from Johndoe Property. AENUS has a problem and is running low on power, but Judith won't fix him unless he sends a message to her boys. When she gets what she wants AENUS allows it and sends a message. This fails and AENUS runs out of power. At first, Judith does nothing until she has a change of heart and fixes AENUS.
5	"Hit the Road, Gabe" (Mannequin, pis?)	Suren Perera	Andrew de Angelis	October 15, 2020	October 18, 2020
Gabe is discovered making out with a female limbless mannequin, while Rafe is celebrated for killing a one-eyed mutant peeping on Suzette. Gabe drives away to a bunker he grew up in with his mother to escape humiliation from Rafe's celebration with the mannequin but finds out Rafe escaped himself in the vehicle. They both soon get chased by Manson to the bunker and later escaped leaving the mannequin behind, Gabe finds out that Rafe was not telling the truth about the mutant. Judith replaces AENUS with a 1960s AI only to find that its 60's programming won't allow her out of the super bunker. A false preacher enters the town to cause trouble with the town folk and only Vijay and Father Mannilla can save them.
6	"I'm An Intern 4 You" (Un stagiaire pas comme les autres)	Suren Perera	Andrew Healey	October 22, 2020	October 25, 2020
Gabe and Rafe play poker with Johndoe for a pile of batteries and in the end win, but they also win a mutated slave under the preferred term Intern. During the day the two brothers use him and even allow Dwayne and Suzette to borrow him. Seeing the two abuse him, the brothers see what they have become and try to tell the intern he is free but the intern stays and willingly offers his loyalty. Gabe forces the intern to leave but Manson makes his appearance soon after and orders his intern back. To repair the damage caused by Johndoe the brothers become interns for Manson and he decides to sell them. In the end, the mutated Intern buys the brothers. In the super bunker, Judith hatches a plan to fake her death to trick AENUS to shoot her out of the bunker trash shoot. As usual, the plan fails as AENUS explains any trash that's thrown out gets sent to be incinerated. Close call for Judith.
7	"Ana-Mouse-ity" (Souris, tu m'inquiètes!)	Suren Perera	Story by : Kate Hewlett; Teleplay by : Andrew Healey	October 29, 2020	November 1, 2020
After the citizens discover Anna making secret biological notes on everyone, they shun her. Anna does not mind in the least. A large talking mutated mouse with a third large human ear on his back arrives in town. Anna in disguise becomes friends with the mouse and soon they become intellectual friends with common interests. The citizens soon find themselves locked in a cellar and drink themselves drunk. Anna and the mouse soon leave, later things change and she sees his true colours, she manages to escape and the mouse chases her to town. She subdues him to study him since her curiosity about biological animals was greater. She frees the citizens and excepts she is not so different than the others. This scares the citizens and they make up with Anna. In the super bunker, it's Judith's birthday AENUS decides to give her a present. The present is a helmet simulation of her escaping out of the bunker, this soon becomes more of a prank than a present.
8	"A Fistful of Larva" (Pour une poignée de larves)	Suren Perera	Jeremy Winkels	November 5, 2020	November 8, 2020
Gabe saves a mutated female stripper praying mantis and she decides to become his lover. She takes advantage of her stay and gives birth to a maggot mutated toothed baby which decides to instinctively eat the trapped Rafe, Anna and Dwayne. It is up to Gabe to choose between his new lover and his friends. AENUS is having trouble sleeping and Judith helps to escape the super bunker. During their talk, AENUS talks about his mother. As usual, AENUS sees through her plan. Danika interrupts Vijay's love with an invisible girl, only to accidentally murder the invisible girl's invisible boyfriend and bury the body. Vijay tells Danika he was dumped by his new girlfriend and in the end the two walk home with three unhappy invisible parents and a former invisible girlfriend.
9	"Dude Kinda Looks Like a Lady" (Un sein vaut mieux que deux tu l'auras)	Suren Perera	Craig Martin	November 12, 2020	November 15, 2020
10	"All About My Mothers" (Tout sur des momans)	Suren Perera	Ivy Johnson	January 7, 2021	January 10, 2021
11	"Armageddit - On!" (Gab-iateur)	Suren Perera	Mark Little	January 14, 2021	January 17, 2021
12	"St. Zephyr's Day" (Le jour de la St-Zéphyr)	Suren Perera	Andrew Healy	January 21, 2021	January 24, 2021
13	"In Rafe We Trust" (L'Évangile selon Raph)	Suren Perera	Mark Steinberg	January 28, 2021	January 31, 2021
14	"Boomsday Brothers" (Pris en sandwich)	Suren Perera	Jono Howard	February 4, 2021	February 7, 2021
15	"The M Word" (Mutisme systémique)	Suren Perera	Jeremy Winkels	February 11, 2021	February 14, 2021
16	"Daddy Issues" (Père manquant, fils mutant)	Suren Perera	Penelope Lauremce	February 18, 2021	February 21, 2021
17	"Mutants Gone Wild" (Les jumeaux du lendemain de veille)	Suren Perera	Emma Overton	February 25, 2021	February 28, 2021
18	"All Is Lost" (Tout est consommé)	Suren Perera	Allen Markuze	March 4, 2021	March 7, 2021
