= Bryan Bugarín =

Spanish footballer (born 2009)

Personal information
- Full name: Bryan Bugarín Gonçalves
- Date of birth: 17 March 2009 (age 17)
- Place of birth: Vigo, Spain
- Height: 1.81 m (5 ft 11 in)
- Position: Midfielder

Team information
- Current team: Real Madrid

Youth career
- 2015–2017: Arosa
- 2017–2021: Celta
- 2021–: Real Madrid

International career^{‡}
Years	Team	Apps	(Gls)
2023	Spain U15	3	(0)
- ‡ National team caps and goals as of 7 October 2023

Bryan Bugarín Gonçalves (born 17 March 2009) is a Spanish footballer who plays as a midfielder for Real Madrid.

== Early life ==
Bugarín was born on 17 March 2009. Born in Vigo, Spain, he is a native of the city.

Born to a Brazilian mother and a Spanish father, he is the younger brother of Spanish footballer Erik Bugarín and obtained Brazilian citizenship and Spanish citizenship. Growing up, he visited Brazil once and is a Catholic and regarded Brazil internationals Rodrygo, Neymar, and Vinícius Júnior as his football idols.

== Club career ==
As a youth player, Bugarín joined the youth academy of Arosa. Following his stint there, he joined the youth academy of Celta in 2018 at the age of nine, where he played in the La Liga FC Futures International Tournament.

Ahead of the 2025–26 season, he joined the youth academy of La Liga side Real Madrid, where he wore the number ten jersey while playing for the club's under-16 team and played in the Alkass International Cup. In 2025, he signed his first professional contract with them with a €75 million release clause. While playing for them, he received interest from German Bundesliga side BVB, English Premier League side Liverpool, and French Ligue 1 side PSG.

== International career ==
Bugarín is a Spain youth international and has represented the country internationally at under-15 level and is eligible to represent Brazil internationally.

On 2 October 2023, he debuted for the Spain national under-15 football team during a 4–1 away friendly win over the Iceland national under-15 football team. After that, he was called up to the Spain national under-17 football team.

== Style of play ==
Bugarín plays as a midfielder. Left-footed, he is known for his passing ability.

American news website The Sporting News wrote in 2026 that he "is described as a modern attacking midfielder, but with classic playmaker characteristics. Its main distinguishing feature is the ability to orchestrate plays between the lines, speeding up or slowing down the pace as needed during the match..analysts of the Spanish youth system often highlight his ability to dribble at speed and find teammates in finishing positions, a characteristic that makes him more of a creator than a goalscorer".
