= 2026–27 Paris Saint-Germain FC season =

57th season in existence of Paris Saint-Germain

Paris Saint-Germain
2026–27 season
- President: Nasser Al-Khelaifi
- Head coach: Luis Enrique
- Stadium: Parc des Princes
- Ligue 1: 1st
- Coupe de France: Round of 64
- Trophée des Champions: Runners-up
- UEFA Champions League: League phase
- UEFA Super Cup: Winners
- FIFA Intercontinental Cup: Final
- Top goalscorer: League: Ferran Torres (4); All: Ferran Torres (7)
- Highest home attendance: 47,926 vs Le Mans, Ligue 1, 10 October 2026 vs Lyon, Ligue 1, 26 October 2026
- Lowest home attendance: 46,945 vs Monaco, Ligue 1, 4 September 2026
- Average home league attendance: 47,651
- Biggest win: 6–0 vs Villarreal, Champions League, 3 November 2026
- Biggest defeat: 0–1 vs Lens, Trophée des Champions, 16 August 2026; 1–2 vs Monaco, Ligue 1, 4 September 2026
Home colours	Away colours	Third colours
- All statistics correct as of 7 November 2026.

The 2026–27 season is the 57th season in the history of Paris Saint-Germain, and the club's 53rd consecutive season in the French top flight. The club is participating in Ligue 1, the Coupe de France, the Trophée des Champions, the UEFA Champions League, the UEFA Super Cup and the FIFA Intercontinental Cup.

== Kits ==
Home	Away	Third	Fourth	Fifth

== Squad information ==
Players and squad numbers last updated on 4 September 2026.
Note: Flags indicate national team as has been defined under FIFA eligibility rules. Players may hold more than one non-FIFA nationality.

No.	Player	Nat.	Position(s)	Date of birth (age)	Contract ends	Transfer fee	Signed from
Goalkeepers
16	Alessandro Longoni	(Italy)	GK	31 January 2008 (age 18)	2031	Free transfer	(Italy) Milan Futuro
30	Lucas Chevalier	(France)	GK	6 November 2001 (age 25)	2030	€40M	(France) Lille
39	Matvey Safonov	(Russia)	GK	25 February 1999 (age 27)	2029	€20M	(Russia) Krasnodar
Defenders
2	Achraf Hakimi (VC)	(Morocco)	RB	4 November 1998 (age 28)	2029	€68M	(Italy) Inter Milan
4	Lucas Beraldo	(Brazil)	CB / DM	24 November 2003 (age 22)	2031	€20M	(Brazil) São Paulo
5	Marquinhos (C)	(Brazil)	CB	14 May 1994 (age 32)	2028	€31.4M	(Italy) Roma
6	Illia Zabarnyi	(Ukraine)	CB	1 September 2002 (age 24)	2030	€63M	(England) Bournemouth
12	Lucas Digne	(France)	LB	20 July 1993 (age 33)	2029	€7M	(England) Aston Villa
21	Lucas Hernandez	(France)	LB	14 February 1996 (age 30)	2028	€45M	(Germany) Bayern Munich
25	Nuno Mendes	(Portugal)	LB	19 June 2002 (age 24)	2029	€38M	(Portugal) Sporting CP
42	David Boly	(France)	RB	22 January 2009 (age 17)	2027	N/A	(France) Youth Sector
51	Willian Pacho	(Ecuador)	CB	16 October 2001 (age 25)	2031	€40M	(Germany) Eintracht Frankfurt
Midfielders
8	Fabián Ruiz	(Spain)	CM	4 April 1996 (age 30)	2028	€22.5M	(Italy) Napoli
11	Maghnes Akliouche	(France)	AM / RW	25 February 2002 (age 24)	2031	€50M	(France) Monaco
17	Vitinha (VC)	(Portugal)	DM	13 February 2000 (age 26)	2029	€41.5M	(Portugal) Porto
24	Senny Mayulu	(France)	CM	17 May 2006 (age 20)	2031	N/A	(France) Youth Sector
27	Dro Fernández	(Spain)	CM	12 January 2008 (age 18)	2030	€8.2M	(Spain) Barcelona
33	Warren Zaïre-Emery	(France)	CM / RB / LB	8 March 2006 (age 20)	2029	N/A	(France) Youth Sector
87	João Neves	(Portugal)	CM	27 September 2004 (age 22)	2031	€65.92M	(Portugal) Benfica
Forwards
7	Khvicha Kvaratskhelia	(Georgia (country))	LW	12 February 2001 (age 25)	2029	€70M	(Italy) Napoli
9	Ferran Torres	(Spain)	CF	29 February 2000 (age 26)	2031	€48.5M	(Spain) Barcelona
10	Ousmane Dembélé (VC)	(France)	CF / RW	15 May 1997 (age 29)	2028	€50M	(Spain) Barcelona
14	Désiré Doué	(France)	RW / LW	3 June 2005 (age 21)	2029	€50M	(France) Rennes
22	Mika Godts	(Belgium)	LW	7 June 2005 (age 21)	2031	€45M	(Netherlands) Ajax
47	Quentin Ndjantou	(France)	LW / CF	23 July 2007 (age 19)	2028	N/A	(France) Youth Sector

== Transfers ==
=== In ===
No.	Pos.	Player	Transferred from	Fee	Date	Source
—	MF	(Tunisia) Khalil Ayari	(Tunisia) Stade Tunisien	€1 million	1 July 2026	
16	GK	(Italy) Alessandro Longoni	Unattached	Free	6 July 2026	
11	MF	(France) Maghnes Akliouche	(France) Monaco	€50 million	6 August 2026	
12	DF	(France) Lucas Digne	(England) Aston Villa	€7 million	9 August 2026	
9	FW	(Spain) Ferran Torres	(Spain) Barcelona	€48.5 million	15 August 2026	
22	FW	(Belgium) Mika Godts	(Netherlands) Ajax	€45 million (Note: Up to €10 million in bonuses)	15 August 2026	

=== Out ===
Pos.	Player	Transferred to	Fee	Date	Source
DF	(France) Noham Kamara	(France) Lyon	€4.1 million	10 June 2026	
FW	(Portugal) Gonçalo Ramos	(Italy) Milan	€74 million	30 June 2026	
FW	(Morocco) Ilyes Housni	(France) Nancy	Free	1 July 2026	
MF	(France) Mathis Jangéal	(Portugal) Famalicão	Free	1 July 2026	
FW	(France) Pierre Mounguengue	(Ukraine) Dynamo Kyiv	Free	1 July 2026	
GK	(Italy) Renato Marin	(Portugal) Nacional	Loan	6 July 2026	
MF	(Brazil) Gabriel Moscardo	(Spain) Espanyol	Loan	8 July 2026	
MF	(South Korea) Lee Kang-in	(Spain) Atlético Madrid	€35 million (Note: Up to €5 million in bonuses)	25 July 2026	
DF	(Morocco) Naoufel El Hannach	(France) Montpellier	Loan	30 July 2026	
FW	(France) Randal Kolo Muani	(Italy) Juventus	€38 million (Note: Up to €12 million in bonuses)	2 August 2026	
MF	(Tunisia) Khalil Ayari	(France) Dunkerque	Loan	4 August 2026	
FW	(France) Noah Nsoki	(Croatia) Dinamo Zagreb	Free	8 August 2026	
DF	(France) Yoram Zague	(Cyprus) Pafos	Loan	25 August 2026	
FW	(France) Bradley Barcola	(England) Liverpool	€125 million (Note: Up to €20 million in bonuses)	31 August 2026	
FW	(Senegal) Ibrahim Mbaye	(England) Aston Villa	€55 million	1 September 2026	
MF	(Portugal) Renato Sanches	Released	Free	1 September 2026	

== Pre-season and friendlies ==
Win Draw Loss Fixtures

5 August 2026 Friendly	Mallorca	3–0	Paris Saint-Germain	Palma, Spain
21:00 CEST (UTC+2)	Luvumbo 21'; Virgili 40'; Raíllo 51'; Roca (yellow card) 62'	Report		Stadium: Estadi Mallorca Son Moix; Attendance: 17,524; Referee: Víctor García Verdura (Spain)

8 August 2026 Friendly	Paris Saint-Germain	1–1	Manchester United	Gothenburg, Sweden
17:00 CEST (UTC+2)	Mbaye 2'	Report	Heaven (yellow card) 16'; Mbeumo 32'	Stadium: Ullevi; Referee: Joakim Sars (Sweden)

== Competitions ==
=== Overall record ===
Competition	First match	Last match	Starting round	Final position	Record							
Competition	First match	Last match	Starting round	Final position	Pld	W	D	L	GF	GA	GD	Win %
Ligue 1	23 August 2026	29 May 2027	Matchday 1	TBD	11	8	2	1	25	12	+13	72.73
Coupe de France	19–21 December 2026	TBD	Round of 64	TBD	0	0	0	0	0	0	+0	—
Trophée des Champions	16 August 2026		Final	Runners-up	1	0	0	1	0	1	−1	0.00
UEFA Champions League	9 September 2026	TBD	League phase	TBD	4	4	0	0	20	5	+15	100.00
UEFA Super Cup	12 August 2026		Final	Winners	1	1	0	0	2	1	+1	100.00
FIFA Intercontinental Cup	16 December 2026		Final	TBD	0	0	0	0	0	0	+0	—
Total					17	13	2	2	47	19	+28	76.47

Last updated: 7 November 2026
Source: Soccerway

=== Ligue 1 ===
==== League table ====
Pos	Team	Pld	W	D	L	GF	GA	GD	Pts	Qualification or relegation
1	Paris Saint-Germain	11	8	2	1	25	12	+13	26	Qualification for the Champions League league phase
2	Paris FC	11	7	2	2	21	10	+11	23	Qualification for the Champions League league phase
3	Lille	11	6	3	2	14	8	+6	21	Qualification for the Champions League league phase
4	Lyon	11	6	2	3	16	9	+7	20	Qualification for the Champions League third qualifying round
5	Marseille	10	6	0	4	22	14	+8	18	Qualification for the Europa League league phase (Note: The 2026–27 Coupe de France winners also qualify for the Europa League league phase (or the sixth-placed team if the Coupe de France winners finish in the top five). If the Coupe de France winners finish in the top six, the Conference League spot will be passed to the seventh-placed team.)

Updated to match(es) played on 22 November 2026. Source: Ligue 1
Rules for classification: 1) Points; 2) Goal difference; 3) Head-to-head points; 4) Head-to-head goal difference; 5) Goals scored; 6) Wins; 7) Away wins; 8) Fair-play points; 9) Drawing of lots.
(Note: Head-to-head record is used only after all the matches between the teams in question have been played).

==== Results summary ====
Overall								Home						Away					
Pld	W	D	L	GF	GA	GD	Pts	W	D	L	GF	GA	GD	W	D	L	GF	GA	GD
11	8	2	1	25	12	+13	26	3	0	1	7	3	+4	5	2	0	18	9	+9

Last updated: 21 November 2026.
Source: Ligue 1

==== Results by round ====
Round	1	2	3	4	5	6	7	8	9	10	11	12	13	14	15	16	17	18	19	20	21	22	23	24	25	26	27	28	29	30	31	32	33	34
Ground	A	A	H	A	A	H	A	H	A	H	A	H	A	H	A	A	H	A	H	A	H	H	H	A	H	A	H	H	A	H	A	H	A	H
Result	D	D	L	W	W	W	W	W	W	W	W																							
Position	8	12	13	7	6	6	2	1	1	1	1																							

Updated to match(es) played on 21 November 2026. Source: Ligue 1
A = Away; H = Home; W = Win; D = Draw; L = Loss

==== Matches ====
The league fixtures were announced on 10 June 2026.

23 August 2026 1	Rennes	2–2	Paris Saint-Germain	Rennes
20:45 CEST (UTC+2)	Szymański 9'; Lepaul 38'; Thomasson (yellow card) 42'; Al-Taamari (yellow card) 63'	Report	Torres 71', 82'; Marquinhos (yellow card) 78'; Hakimi (yellow card) 84'	Stadium: Roazhon Park; Attendance: 28,255; Referee: Bastien Dechepy

28 August 2026 2	Lille	2–2	Paris Saint-Germain	Villeneuve-d'Ascq
20:45 CEST (UTC+2)	Haraldsson 21'; André (yellow card) 52'; Bakwa 84'; Perraud (yellow card) 90+4'	Report	Fabián (yellow card) 39'; Vitinha 90+1'; Marquinhos 90+5'	Stadium: Stade Pierre-Mauroy; Attendance: 47,793; Referee: Éric Wattellier

4 September 2026 3	Paris Saint-Germain	1–2	Monaco	Paris
21:05 CEST (UTC+2)	Marquinhos 31'; Hernandez (yellow card) 68'	Report	Nazinho 58'; Teze (yellow card) 68'; Idumbo 72'	Stadium: Parc des Princes; Attendance: 46,945; Referee: Jérôme Brisard

13 September 2026 4	Brest	0–1	Paris Saint-Germain	Brest
20:45 CEST (UTC+2)	Doumbia (yellow card) 31'	Report	Torres 5'; Vitinha (yellow card) 84'; Fernández (yellow card) 87'	Stadium: Stade Francis-Le Blé; Attendance: 14,944; Referee: Willy Delajod

20 September 2026 5	Marseille	1–2	Paris Saint-Germain	Marseille
20:45 CEST (UTC+2)	Weah (yellow card) 32' (yellow-red card) 77'; Gomes 72', (yellow card) 90'; Abdallah (yellow card) 81'	Report	Mendes (yellow card) 39'; Torres 66'; Marquinhos 74'	Stadium: Stade Vélodrome; Attendance: 61,499; Referee: François Letexier

10 October 2026 6	Paris Saint-Germain	3–1	Le Mans	Paris
20:45 CEST (UTC+2)	Beraldo 19' (pen.); Kvaratskhelia 61'; Akliouche 68'; Doué (penalty missed) 90+3'	Report	Gueye (yellow card) 47'; Mafouta 54', (yellow card) 65'; Bamba (yellow card) 90+2'; Brahimi (yellow card) 90+2'; Boissé (yellow card) 90+3'	Stadium: Parc des Princes; Attendance: 47,926; Referee: Mathieu Vernice

17 October 2026 7	Strasbourg	1–3	Paris Saint-Germain	Strasbourg
17:15 CEST (UTC+2)	Reyna 17'; Harder (yellow card) 76'; Essugo (yellow card) 78'	Report	Dembélé (penalty missed) 72', 85'; Zabarnyi 77'; Doué 90+3'	Stadium: Stade de la Meinau; Attendance: 31,331; Referee: Willy Delajod

26 October 2026 8	Paris Saint-Germain	2–0	Lyon	Paris
20:30 CET (UTC+1)	Vitinha (yellow card) 31'; Akliouche (yellow card) 51'; Mayulu 72'; Godts 84'	Report	Nuamah (yellow card) 74'	Stadium: Parc des Princes; Attendance: 47,926; Referee: Jérôme Brisard

30 October 2026 9	Le Havre	1–5	Paris Saint-Germain	Le Havre
19:00 CET (UTC+1)	Maja 18'	Report	Godts 26'; Hakimi 28', 55', 69'; Mayulu 62'	Stadium: Stade Océane; Attendance: 23,714; Referee: François Letexier

7 November 2026 10	Paris Saint-Germain	1–0	Troyes	Paris
20:45 CET (UTC+1)	Zabarnyi (yellow card) 34', (goal) 39'	Report	Le Douaron (yellow card) 79'; Mille (yellow card) 86'	Stadium: Parc des Princes; Attendance: 47,807; Referee: Ruddy Buquet

21 November 2026 11	Nice	2–3	Paris Saint-Germain	Nice
17:15 CET (UTC+1)	Amoura 8'; Boudaoui (yellow card) 54'; Seidu (yellow card) 75'; Abdi 90+5'	Report	Mayulu 31' (pen.); Doué 32'; Torres 85'	Stadium: Allianz Riviera; Referee: Jérôme Brisard

28 November 2026 12	Paris Saint-Germain	v	Lorient	Paris
20:45 CET (UTC+1)		Report		Stadium: Parc des Princes

4 December 2026 13	Toulouse	v	Paris Saint-Germain	Toulouse
20:45 CET (UTC+1)		Report		Stadium: Stadium de Toulouse

12 December 2026 14	Paris Saint-Germain	v	Paris FC	Paris
17:15 CET (UTC+1)		Report		Stadium: Parc des Princes

3 January 2027 15	Lens	v	Paris Saint-Germain	Lens
20:45 CET (UTC+1)		Report		Stadium: Stade Bollaert-Delelis

16 January 2027 16	Angers	v	Paris Saint-Germain	Angers
17:15 CET (UTC+1)		Report		Stadium: Stade Raymond Kopa

23 January 2027 17	Paris Saint-Germain	v	Auxerre	Paris
20:45 CET (UTC+1)		Report		Stadium: Parc des Princes

30 January 2027 18	Monaco	v	Paris Saint-Germain	Monaco
17:15 CET (UTC+1)		Report		Stadium: Stade Louis II

7 February 2027 19	Paris Saint-Germain	v	Marseille	Paris
20:45 CET (UTC+1)		Report		Stadium: Parc des Princes

14 February 2027 20	Le Mans	v	Paris Saint-Germain	Le Mans
--:-- CET (UTC+1)		Report		Stadium: Stade Marie-Marvingt

21 February 2027 21	Paris Saint-Germain	v	Brest	Paris
--:-- CET (UTC+1)		Report		Stadium: Parc des Princes

28 February 2027 22	Paris Saint-Germain	v	Lens	Paris
20:45 CET (UTC+1)		Report		Stadium: Parc des Princes

7 March 2027 23	Paris Saint-Germain	v	Rennes	Paris
--:-- CET (UTC+1)				Stadium: Parc des Princes

14 March 2027 24	Auxerre	v	Paris Saint-Germain	Auxerre
--:-- CET (UTC+1)		Report		Stadium: Stade de l'Abbé-Deschamps

21 March 2027 25	Paris Saint-Germain	v	Strasbourg	Paris
--:-- CET (UTC+1)		Report		Stadium: Parc des Princes

4 April 2027 26	Paris FC	v	Paris Saint-Germain	Paris
--:-- CEST (UTC+2)		Report		Stadium: Stade Jean-Bouin

11 April 2027 27	Paris Saint-Germain	v	Le Havre	Paris
--:-- CEST (UTC+2)		Report		Stadium: Parc des Princes

18 April 2027 28	Paris Saint-Germain	v	Lille	Paris
--:-- CEST (UTC+2)		Report		Stadium: Parc des Princes

25 April 2027 29	Lorient	v	Paris Saint-Germain	Lorient
--:-- CET (UTC+1)		Report		Stadium: Stade du Moustoir

2 May 2027 30	Paris Saint-Germain	v	Angers	Paris
--:-- CEST (UTC+2)		Report		Stadium: Parc des Princes

9 May 2027 31	Lyon	v	Paris Saint-Germain	Décines-Charpieu
20:45 CEST (UTC+2)		Report		Stadium: Parc Olympique Lyonnais

16 May 2027 32	Paris Saint-Germain	v	Nice	Paris
--:-- CEST (UTC+2)		Report		Stadium: Parc des Princes

22 May 2027 33	Troyes	v	Paris Saint-Germain	Troyes
21:00 CEST (UTC+2)		Report		Stadium: Stade de l'Aube

29 May 2027 34	Paris Saint-Germain	v	Toulouse	Paris
21:00 CEST (UTC+2)		Report		Stadium: Parc des Princes

=== Coupe de France ===
19–21 December 2026 Round of 64	v
--:-- CET (UTC+1)

=== Trophée des Champions ===
16 August 2026 Final	Lens	1–0	Paris Saint-Germain	Lens
20:45 CEST (UTC+2)	Thauvin 32'; Antonio (red card) 39'; Bulatović (yellow card) 90'	Report	Doué (yellow card) 64'; Mendes (red card) 86'; Fabián (yellow card) 89'; Hakimi (yellow card) 90'	Stadium: Stade Bollaert-Delelis; Attendance: 38,223; Referee: Jérémie Pignard

=== UEFA Champions League ===
==== League phase ====
The draw for the league phase was held on 27 August 2026. The league phase fixtures were announced on 29 August 2026.

Pos	Team	Pld	W	D	L	GF	GA	GD	Pts	Qualification
1	(France) Paris Saint-Germain	4	4	0	0	20	5	+15	12	Advance to round of 16 (seeded)
2	(Spain) Real Madrid	4	4	0	0	13	7	+6	12	Advance to round of 16 (seeded)
3	(England) Arsenal	4	3	1	0	8	3	+5	10	Advance to round of 16 (seeded)
4	(Italy) Como	4	3	0	1	19	6	+13	9	Advance to round of 16 (seeded)
5	(Spain) Barcelona	4	3	0	1	14	6	+8	9	Advance to round of 16 (seeded)

Updated to match(es) played on 4 November 2026. Source: UEFA
Rules for classification: League phase tiebreakers

Round	1	2	3	4	5	6	7	8
Ground	H	A	H	A	H	A	A	H
Result	W	W	W	W				
Position	1	1	1	1				

Updated to match(es) played on 3 November 2026. Source: UEFA
A = Away; H = Home; W = Win; D = Draw; L = Loss

9 September 2026 1	Paris Saint-Germain (France)	6–1	(Slovakia) Slovan Bratislava	Paris, France
21:00 CEST (UTC+2)	Dembélé 17', 23'; Torres 31', 47', 57'; Fabián 88'	Report	Blackman (yellow card) 53'; Su. Camara 59'	Stadium: Parc des Princes; Attendance: 47,511; Referee: Mykola Balakin (Ukraine)

14 October 2026 2	Manchester City (England)	2–4	(France) Paris Saint-Germain	Manchester, England
20:00 BST	Haaland 53', 75'; Semenyo (yellow card) 61'	Report	Doué 13'; Dembélé 15'; Vitinha 32'; Akliouche 63'; Zaïre-Emery (yellow card) 69'; Torres (penalty missed) 90'	Stadium: Etihad Stadium; Attendance: 60,021; Referee: Sven Jablonski (Germany)

20 October 2026 3	Paris Saint-Germain (France)	4–2	(Spain) Barcelona	Paris, France
21:00 CEST (UTC+2)	Doué 38'; Hernandez 72'; Vitinha 81'; Fabián 86'	Report	Cancelo (yellow card) 17'; Espart 55'; Yamal 79'	Stadium: Parc des Princes; Attendance: 47,421; Referee: Michael Oliver (England)

3 November 2026 4	Villarreal (Spain)	0–6	(France) Paris Saint-Germain	Villarreal, Spain
21:00 CET (UTC+1)	Comesaña (yellow card) 45'; Mouriño (yellow card) 50'; Cardona (yellow card) 66'; Moleiro (yellow card) 78'	Report	Neves 9'; Doué 12'; Mayulu 13'; Fabián 17', 50'; Ndjantou (yellow card) 74'; Boly 78'	Stadium: Estadio de la Cerámica; Attendance: 20,036; Referee: Felix Zwayer (Germany)

25 November 2026 5	Paris Saint-Germain (France)	v	(Italy) Roma	Paris, France
21:00 CET (UTC+1)		Report		Stadium: Parc des Princes

8 December 2026 6	Aston Villa (England)	v	(France) Paris Saint-Germain	Birmingham, England
20:00 GMT		Report		Stadium: Villa Park

20 January 2027 7	Como (Italy)	v	(France) Paris Saint-Germain	Como, Italy
21:00 CET (UTC+1)		Report		Stadium: Stadio Giuseppe Sinigaglia

27 January 2027 8	Paris Saint-Germain (France)	v	(Turkey) Galatasaray	Paris, France
21:00 CET (UTC+1)		Report		Stadium: Parc des Princes

=== UEFA Super Cup ===
12 August 2026 Final	Paris Saint-Germain (France)	2–1	(England) Aston Villa	Salzburg, Austria
21:00 CEST (UTC+2)	Kvaratskhelia 20'; Doué 61'	Report	Madjo 45'; Torres (yellow card) 51'; João Gomes (yellow card) 64'; McGinn (yellow card) 72'	Stadium: Stadion Salzburg; Attendance: 27,681; Referee: Omar Artan (Somalia)

=== FIFA Intercontinental Cup ===
16 December 2026 Final	Paris Saint-Germain (France)	v	TBD	Al Rayyan, Qatar
19:00 AST (UTC+3)				Stadium: Ahmad bin Ali Stadium

== Statistics ==
=== Appearances and goals ===
No.	Pos	Nat	Player	Total		Ligue 1		Coupe de France		Trophée des Champions		UEFA Champions League		UEFA Super Cup		FIFA Intercontinental Cup	
No.	Pos	Nat	Player	Apps	Goals	Apps	Goals	Apps	Goals	Apps	Goals	Apps	Goals	Apps	Goals	Apps	Goals
Goalkeepers
16	GK	(Italy) ITA	Alessandro Longoni	0	0	0	0	0	0	0	0	0	0	0	0	0	0
30	GK	(France) FRA	Lucas Chevalier	0	0	0	0	0	0	0	0	0	0	0	0	0	0
39	GK	(Russia) RUS	Matvey Safonov	16	0	10	0	0	0	1	0	4	0	1	0	0	0
Defenders
2	DF	(Morocco) MAR	Achraf Hakimi	14	3	7+1	3	0	0	1	0	4	0	1	0	0	0
4	DF	(Brazil) BRA	Lucas Beraldo	13	1	3+5	1	0	0	1	0	0+3	0	0+1	0	0	0
5	DF	(Brazil) BRA	Marquinhos	8	3	5	3	0	0	0	0	2	0	1	0	0	0
6	DF	(Ukraine) UKR	Illia Zabarnyi	9	2	5	2	0	0	1	0	2+1	0	0	0	0	0
12	DF	(France) FRA	Lucas Digne	6	0	3+1	0	0	0	1	0	0+1	0	0	0	0	0
21	DF	(France) FRA	Lucas Hernandez	12	1	5+2	0	0	0	0	0	2+2	1	0+1	0	0	0
25	DF	(Portugal) POR	Nuno Mendes	7	0	2+1	0	0	0	0+1	0	2	0	1	0	0	0
42	DF	(France) FRA	David Boly	2	1	0+1	0	0	0	0	0	0+1	1	0	0	0	0
51	DF	(Ecuador) ECU	Willian Pacho	13	0	7	0	0	0	1	0	4	0	1	0	0	0
Midfielders
8	MF	(Spain) ESP	Fabián Ruiz	14	4	5+3	0	0	0	0+1	0	4	4	0+1	0	0	0
11	MF	(France) FRA	Maghnes Akliouche	15	2	6+3	1	0	0	1	0	3+1	1	1	0	0	0
17	MF	(Portugal) POR	Vitinha	15	3	7+2	1	0	0	1	0	4	2	1	0	0	0
24	MF	(France) FRA	Senny Mayulu	9	3	2+2	2	0	0	0+1	0	1+2	1	0+1	0	0	0
27	MF	(Spain) ESP	Dro Fernández	9	0	3+4	0	0	0	0+1	0	1	0	0	0	0	0
33	MF	(France) FRA	Warren Zaïre-Emery	14	0	9+1	0	0	0	1	0	1+1	0	1	0	0	0
87	MF	(Portugal) POR	João Neves	12	1	7+1	0	0	0	0	0	2+1	1	1	0	0	0
Forwards
7	FW	(Georgia (country)) GEO	Khvicha Kvaratskhelia	11	2	5+2	1	0	0	1	0	1+1	0	1	1	0	0
9	FW	(Spain) ESP	Ferran Torres	14	7	7+3	4	0	0	0	0	1+3	3	0	0	0	0
10	FW	(France) FRA	Ousmane Dembélé	10	4	3+2	1	0	0	0+1	0	3	3	0+1	0	0	0
14	FW	(France) FRA	Désiré Doué	14	5	6+3	1	0	0	1	0	3	3	1	1	0	0
22	FW	(Belgium) BEL	Mika Godts	11	2	3+6	2	0	0	0	0	0+2	0	0	0	0	0
47	FW	(France) FRA	Quentin Ndjantou	4	0	0+3	0	0	0	0	0	0+1	0	0	0	0	0
Players loaned out during the season

Last updated: 7 November 2026
Source: Competitions
