= David Boly =

French footballer (born 2009)

Personal information
- Date of birth: 22 January 2009 (age 17)
- Place of birth: Colombes, France
- Height: 1.81 m (5 ft 11 in)
- Position: Right-back

Team information
- Current team: Paris Saint-Germain
- Number: 42

Youth career
- 2016–2021: Asnières FC
- 2021–2022: Racing Club de France
- 2022–: Paris Saint-Germain

Senior career*
Years	Team	Apps	(Gls)
2025–	Paris Saint-Germain	1	(1)

International career^{‡}
2024	France U16	4	(0)
2025–2026	France U17	9	(0)
2026–	France U19	2	(0)
- * Club domestic league appearances and goals as of 19:54, 30 October 2026 (UTC) ‡ National team caps and goals as of 23:00, 1 October 2026 (UTC)

David Boly (born 22 January 2009) is a French professional footballer who plays as a right-back for Ligue 1 club Paris Saint-Germain.

== Club career ==
As a youth player, Boly joined the youth academy of Asnières FC. Following his stint there, he joined the academy of Racing Club de France in 2021 and the Paris Saint-Germain Youth Academy in 2022.

On 9 November 2025, Boly was included in a Paris Saint-Germain first-team squad for the first time ahead of a Ligue 1 match against Lyon. On 20 December 2025, he made his professional debut for PSG by starting a Coupe de France round of 64 match against 5th-tier club Fontenay, but was replaced after thirty minutes due to injury. On 30 October 2026, Boly played in his first Ligue 1 game, his second professional match, by coming on as a substitute in a 5–1 win over Le Havre. He scored his first professional goal in his third PSG match, the final goal of a 6–0 UEFA Champions League win over Villarreal on 3 November 2026.

== International career ==
Born in France, Boly is of Ivorian descent. He is a France youth international. During May and June 2025, he played for the France under-17s at the 2025 UEFA European Under-17 Championship.

== Career statistics ==
As of match played 3 November 2026

Appearances and goals by club, season and competition
Club	Season	League			Coupe de France		Europe		Other		Total	
Club	Season	Division	Apps	Goals	Apps	Goals	Apps	Goals	Apps	Goals	Apps	Goals
Paris Saint-Germain	2025–26	Ligue 1	0	0	1	0	0	0	0	0	1	0
Paris Saint-Germain	2026–27	Ligue 1	1	0	0	0	1 (Note: Appearance in UEFA Champions League)	1	0	0	2	1
Career total			1	0	1	0	1	1	0	0	3	1

== Honours ==
Paris Saint-Germain U19

- Championnat National U19: 2024–25, 2025–26

Paris Saint-Germain U18

- Coupe Gambardella: 2025–26
