= Titouan Fortun =

Malagasy footballer (born 2004)

Personal information
- Full name: Titouan Safidy Fortun
- Date of birth: 28 January 2004 (age 22)
- Place of birth: Sahabe, Madagascar
- Height: 1.78 m (5 ft 10 in)
- Position: Left-back

Team information
- Current team: Nantes II
- Number: 12

Youth career
- 2009–2010: JGE Sucé
- 2010–2023: Nantes

Senior career*
Years	Team	Apps	(Gls)
2023–	Nantes II	3	(0)

International career^{‡}
2023–	Madagascar	2	(0)
- * Club domestic league appearances and goals as of 06:35, 18 November 2023 (UTC) ‡ National team caps and goals as of 06:35, 18 November 2023 (UTC)

Titouan Safidy Fortun (born 28 January 2004) is a Malagasy professional footballer who plays as a left-back for the French club Nantes II and the Madagascar national team.

== Club career ==
Fortun began playing football with JGE Sucé at the age of 5, before moving to Nantes' youth academy in 2010. On 8 February 2023, he signed a youth contract with Nantes. He helped the Nantes U19s win consecutive Championnat National U19 titles in 2021–22 and 2022–23. He captained and scored in the final for 2022–23 to clinch trophy.

== International career ==
Fortun debuted for the senior Madagascar national team in a 0–0 2023 Africa Cup of Nations qualification tie with Angola on 7 September 2023. He received his second call-up to the team for a set of 2026 FIFA World Cup qualification matches in November 2023.

== Honours ==
Nantes U19

- Championnat National U19: 2021–22, 2022–23
