= Paris Saint-Germain FC Youth Academy =

Youth academy of French football club Paris Saint-Germain FC

Paris Saint-Germain
- Full name: Paris Saint-Germain FC Youth Academy
- Short name: PSG Youth Academy
- Founded: 12 August 1970; 56 years ago
- Ground: Campus PSG
- Capacity: 1,100
- Management: Association Paris Saint-Germain
- President: Benoît Rousseau
- Website: asso-psg.fr
Home colours	Away colours

The Paris Saint-Germain FC Youth Academy (French: Centre de formation du Paris Saint-Germain FC), commonly referred to as the PSG Youth Academy, is the youth system for the men's and women's football teams of Paris Saint-Germain. Managed by the Association Paris Saint-Germain, the men's section of the academy was founded in 1970, with its first center opening in 1975. PSG began developing young players for the women's section in 2012, and the first women's center of the academy was inaugurated in 2023. Campus PSG in Poissy is currently the training ground and home stadium for both sections.

Male players progress through the U17, U19, and Espoirs categories before reaching the first team, while the U19 is the final step for female players. Since its creation, the academy has produced players such as Jean-Marc Pilorget, Nicolas Anelka, Mamadou Sakho, Kingsley Coman, Adrien Rabiot, Alphonse Areola, Presnel Kimpembe, Marie-Antoinette Katoto, Grace Geyoro, Perle Morroni and Sandy Baltimore. Many other graduates have also signed professional contracts with PSG or other clubs.

The Espoirs men's team plays in the Challenge Espoirs and the Premier League International Cup, the U19 men's team participates in the Championnat National U19, the Coupe Gambardella, and the UEFA Youth League, and the U17 men's team competes in the Championnat National U17. The U19 women's team, meanwhile, competes in the Championnat National Féminin U19, the Coupe Nike Féminine U18, and the Challenge Espoirs LFFP. Previously, there was also a reserve men's team that played in the Championnat National 1.

Widely regarded as one of the strongest youth systems in the country, the PSG Youth Academy has been named Best Youth Club by the French Football Federation on four occasions. At regional level, the academy has won three Coupe de Paris titles. Nationally, its teams have secured 19 major honours, including 16 league championships and three domestic cups. Beyond official competitions, the academy has also achieved success in several prestigious invitational tournaments, notably the Montaigu Tournament, the Tournoi Carisport, a record three Alkass International Cup victories, and the Tournoi Européen des Centres U21.

== History ==
=== First graduates and Gambardella triumph ===
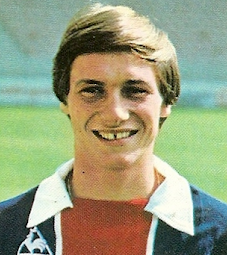
Thierry Morin

The Paris Saint-Germain FC Youth Academy, like the club itself, was founded on 12 August 1970. Its first generation of graduates emerged in the 1972–73 season: Éric Renaut, Patrice Zbinden, Claude Rivet, Patrice Turpin, Bernard Lambert, Michel Llodra, Thierry Coutard, Robin Leclercq and Richard Vanquelles. All of these players would go on to make the first team, with Renaut being the most successful, amassing 290 appearances during his decade at the club. They were part of the club's reserve team that won the Coupe de Paris in 1971–72 and 1972–73, the academy's first titles. PSG won their third and final Coupe de Paris in 1979–80.

On 4 November 1975, the first academy center was opened at the Camp des Loges, under the direction of Pierre Alonzo. That season's generation was led by Jean-Marc Pilorget and Thierry Morin. They made their professional debuts against Reims in a league match at the Parc des Princes on 21 December 1975. Pilorget made 435 official appearances for PSG, the second most in the club's history. Morin played the majority of his career at PSG and is currently the general secretary of the Association Paris Saint-Germain.

The 1980s and 1990s saw the emergence of another generation of young players, including Richard Dutruel, Francis Llacer, Pascal Nouma and Bernard Allou. Before making their senior team debuts, they won the Championnat National des Cadets title in 1988 and the Coupe Gambardella in 1991 with the academy. In 1993, the men's U17 participated in two friendly competitions, winning the Montaigu Tournament and finishing as runners-up in the Plougonvelin Tournament. The PSG academy was given the Best Youth Club award by the French Football Federation (FFF) in 1989.

Dutruel, Llacer, Nouma and Allou were all part of the club's 1996 UEFA Cup Winners' Cup final triumph. Jérôme Leroy, Pierre Ducrocq and Nicolas Anelka also made their first-team debuts during that decade. Anelka pioneered leaving PSG for a modest fee due to a lack of game time. He signed for Arsenal in 1997, aged 17. During the late 1990s and early 2000s, only Sylvain Distin and Bartholomew Ogbeche managed to break into the first team and establish themselves. Furthermore, the youth teams failed to win any trophies.

Fortunes changed in the late 2000s, as PSG began their rise to the top of French youth football. Clément Chantôme and Mamadou Sakho were the two most successful players of those years. They won the club's first Championnat National U19 in 2006 and became first-team regulars, making over 200 appearances and winning several trophies. Sakho captained the club from 2011 to 2012. The Tournoi Carisport, a friendly invitational competition won by the U19 team in 2008, marked the beginning of an era of unprecedented success for the academy.

=== National dominance despite talent exodus ===
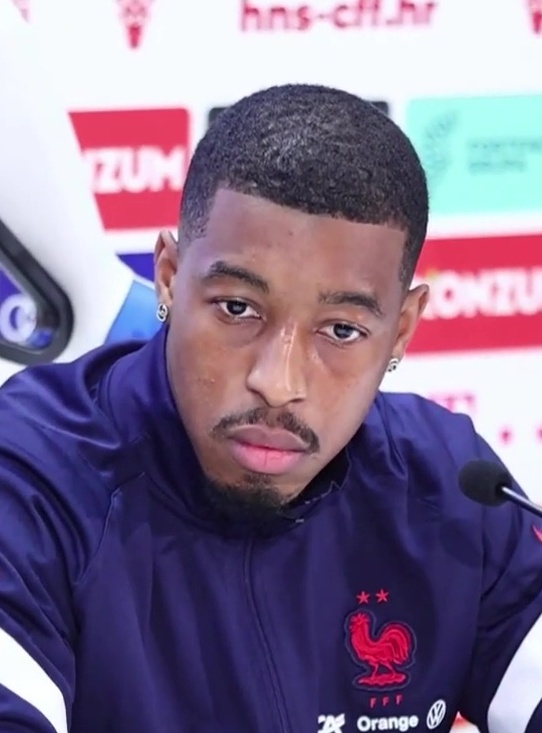
Presnel Kimpembe

Between 2009 and 2019, the PSG Youth Academy dominated the national scene. In 2010, the men's U19 team won the Championnat National final against Monaco, while the men's U17 side lost to Sochaux on penalties. The club also began developing a women's section within the academy. In 2011, PSG became the first club to be crowned French champions at both men's youth levels. The U19s secured their second consecutive title, while the U17s defeated arch-rivals Marseille in the final to claim their first Championnat National U17 title. PSG were subsequently awarded the Best Youth Club prize for the second time in their history in recognition of this U17–U19 double, and received the honor again in 2013 and 2014.

The U19s reached another final in 2012, but would have to wait until 2016 and their victory over Lyon to be crowned champions again. That same season, following back-to-back silver medals in 2014 and 2015, the U17s defeated Saint-Étienne to also win the title, giving PSG their second double. They claimed their second consecutive championship and third overall after beating Monaco in 2017. The women's department performed equally well. As planned, the club began developing players at the Bougival training center in 2012, with Grace Geyoro becoming the first graduate to play for the professional team in 2014. Between 2014 and 2019, the women's U19 team reached the Championnat National Féminin final six times, winning three of them. They defeated Lyon in 2016, 2017 and 2019 to claim the trophy.

PSG also enjoyed success at the European and international levels. The U19 team topped their group with the best record in the 2012–13 NextGen Series, a friendly tournament, but were eliminated on penalties by Tottenham Hotspur in the round of 16. They later reached the final of the UEFA Youth League in 2016, narrowly losing 2–1 to Chelsea, before defeating Monaco to win the Tournoi Européen des Centres U21 in 2018. Meanwhile, the U17 team won the inaugural edition of the Alkass International Cup, another friendly tournament, in 2012, finished as runners-up in 2013, and went on to reclaim the trophy in both 2015 and 2018.

Despite its success, the academy saw the exodus of several promising talents to other European clubs for free during the 2010s. This was the case for Kingsley Coman (Juventus, 2014), Dan-Axel Zagadou (Borussia Dortmund, 2017), Claudio Gomes (Manchester City, 2018), Tanguy Kouassi (Bayern Munich, 2020), Adil Aouchiche (Saint-Étienne, 2020), Vicki Bècho (Lyon, 2020) and Alice Sombath (Lyon, 2020). In contrast, other graduates such as Adrien Rabiot, Alphonse Areola, Presnel Kimpembe, Marie-Antoinette Katoto, Grace Geyoro, Perle Morroni and Sandy Baltimore have played important roles in the men's and women's first teams.

=== Women's academy and Espoirs team ===
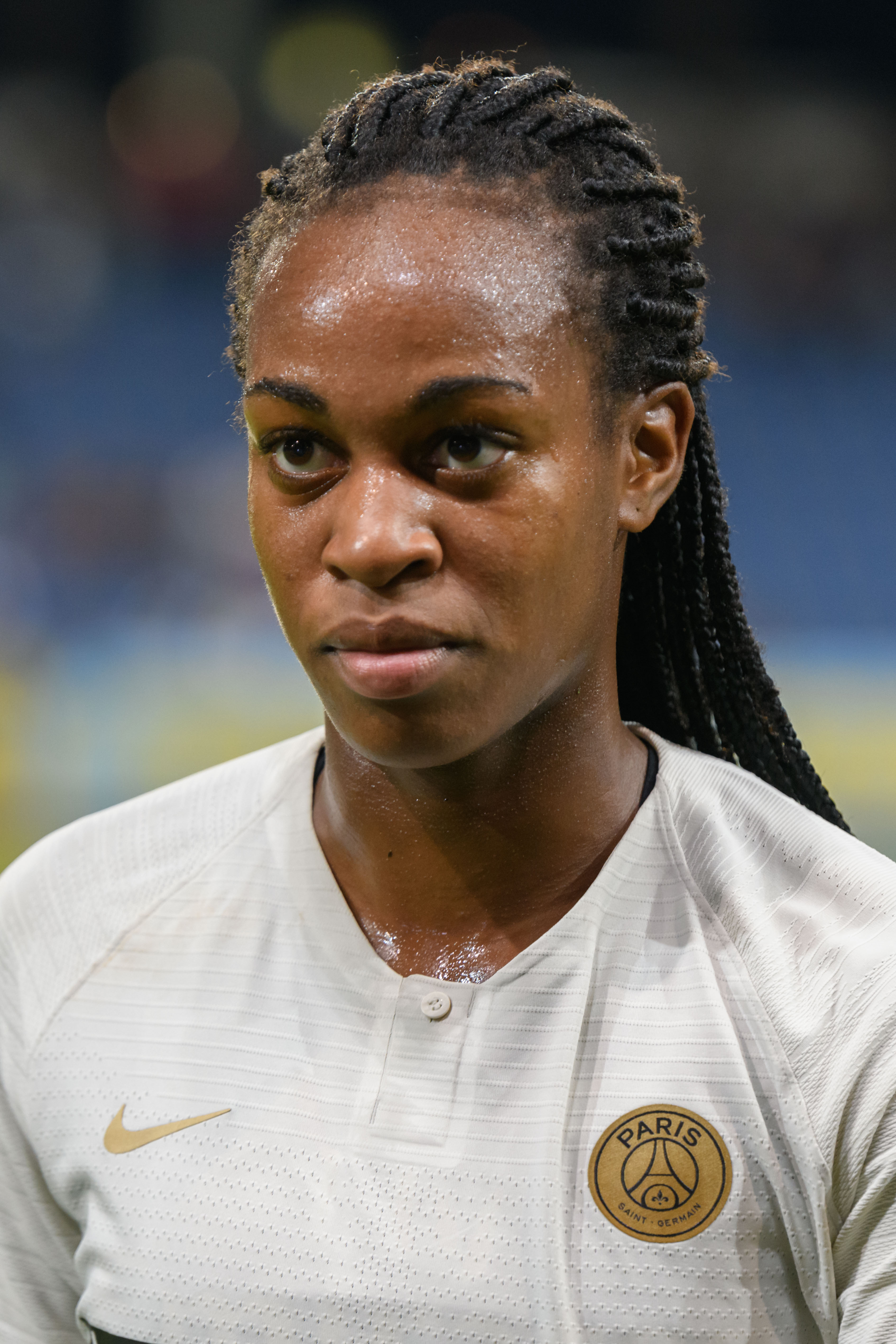
Marie-Antoinette Katoto

In May 2019, following the end of the 2018–19 season, the club decided to disband its men's reserve team and focus on the U19s starting from the 2019–20 campaign. The reserves competed in the Championnat National 1, the fourth tier of French football. The 2019–20 season would have been the academy's first without its reserve team, but the FFF suspended all amateur football leagues due to the COVID-19 pandemic in April 2020. As the coronavirus outbreak continued to spread, the FFF also canceled the 2020–21 campaign for amateur teams.

Despite the enforced inactivity, the FFF still recognized the PSG Youth Academy as the best youth system in the country in 2019 and 2020. In the 2021–22 season, the first to be completed since the pandemic began, the men's U19s and U17s were eliminated at the semi-final stage of their championships, while the women's U19s finished second, behind Lyon. The 2022–23 campaign played out in a similar fashion: the women's U19s finished behind Lyon once again, the men's U17s failed to qualify for the championship phase, and the men's U19s lost the final to Nantes.

On 2 August 2023, after developing their young talents in the U19 team since 2012, the club opened the first women's PSG Youth Academy center, led by technical director Sonia Haziraj. At the time, there were ten players in the first-team squad who had come through the club's academy, most notably Katoto, Geyoro, Baltimore and Laurina Fazer, all of whom had played for France's youth teams and then progressed to the senior team.

After beating Auxerre 3–1 in the final, with goals from Senny Mayulu and Mahamadou Sangaré, PSG clinched the U19 title in 2024. Coached by Zoumana Camara, the Parisians finished top of their group and enjoyed a dominant knockout campaign. Sangaré's hat trick gave PSG a 5–0 victory over Lyon in the quarter-finals, before they defeated Marseille 2–0 in the semi-finals, thanks to goals from Mayulu and Ibrahim Mbaye.

In October 2024, the club created the Espoirs, an additional team within its youth academy, restricted to players under the age of 23, to maximize the playing time of PSG's youngsters and allow them to compete against elite players, thus ensuring a smooth transition to professional teams. The Espoirs participate in the Challenge Espoirs, a competition organized by the FFF. In addition, matches are scheduled throughout the season against teams from Régional 2, Championnat National and Ligue 2, as well as against elite teams from French and foreign professional clubs. Some Espoirs players who meet the eligibility criteria are also called up for UEFA Youth League matches.

=== U19 double and domestic quadruple ===
In the 2024–25 season, PSG's academy recorded mixed results across its youth teams. The women's U19 side claimed their fourth league title and first since 2019 after finishing top of the table, while the men's U19 secured back-to-back championships and their sixth overall, coming from behind to defeat Nantes 2–1 in the final, completing the academy's first U19 double. By contrast, the men's U17 were defeated by Real Madrid in the final of the Alkass International Cup, while the Espoirs endured a difficult inaugural campaign, winning only one match and finishing bottom of their Challenge Espoirs group in sixth place.

During the 2025–26 season, the Espoirs competed in the Premier League International Cup, where they were eliminated in the group stage following a defeat to defending champions Nottingham Forest. They also finished second from bottom in their Challenge Espoirs group, placing eighth overall. In the UEFA Youth League, the U19s advanced from the group stage with wins over Atalanta, Bayern Munich, and Tottenham Hotspur, then beat Dinamo Minsk, HJK Helsinki, and Villarreal in the knockout rounds before losing to Real Madrid on penalties in the semi-finals. Meanwhile, the U17 team reached the final of the Alkass International Cup but lost 5–2 to Barcelona, marking their second consecutive final defeat in the competition.

Domestically, the women's U19 team won the inaugural Coupe Nike, defeating Le Havre on penalties after a 2–2 draw. After trailing at half-time, PSG turned the match around through goals from Oluchi Basil and Léa Morissaint before conceding a late penalty equalizer. PSG won the shootout 5–4 to become the first winners of the competition. However, they finished second in the Elite phase of the league despite matching OL Lyonnes in points and goals scored; the title was decided on the final matchday, with Lyon winning 4–1 to overturn a three-point deficit.

The men's U19 side won their second Coupe Gambardella title, 35 years after their previous triumph in 1991, defeating Montpellier 3–2 at the Stade de France. Despite being reduced to ten men, PSG secured victory, with Mathis Jangéal recording one assist and scoring twice. They also retained the National U19 title for a third consecutive season, defeating Clermont 2–1 in the final after coming from behind, with Jangéal scoring a brace. The result reinforced their status as the most successful club in the competition's history. One day later, the U17 side defeated Angers 2–0 to claim their first national title since 2017, completing the club's second U17–U19 double since 2016. Lorenzo Kana-Biyik opened the scoring before Noha Thiehi added a stoppage-time goal to secure the result. Overall, the academy achieved a domestic quadruple: the Coupe Nike for the women, and the Coupe Gambardella, U17 title, and U19 title for the men.

== Grounds ==
The Paris Saint-Germain Youth Academy is currently located at Campus PSG in Poissy. Its main stadium, with a capacity of 1,100 spectators, as well as the other 15 football pitches in the complex, host the home matches of the three youth teams: the men's U19 and U17 categories, and the women's U19 category. Campus PSG became the training ground of the PSG Youth Academy in January 2024, replacing the Camp des Loges in Saint-Germain-en-Laye. The latter had been the training facility for the club's youth teams since 1975, when the academy's first center was opened there. They used to play their home matches at the Stade Georges Lefèvre, the main stadium of the Camp des Loges.

The men's U19s played their first match at Campus PSG on 21 January 2024: a 5–0 win over Le Havre in the Championnat National U19. The men's U17s made their debut on 28 January 2024, with a 2–0 win against Versailles in the Championnat National U17. The women's U19s beat Guingamp 5–0 in the Championnat National Féminin U19 on 11 February 2024 in their first match there. The Espoirs, however, lost against Nantes 1–3 in the Challenge Espoirs in their inaugural match at Campus PSG on 26 October 2024.

== Statistics ==
=== Seasons ===
As of 2025–26 season.

List of seasons

Winners Runners-up Promoted Relegated

Season	Men's Reserve			Men's Espoirs		Men's U19			Men's U17		Women's U19			Best Youth Club
Season	League		Cup	Challenge	Cup	League	Cup	UEFA	League	Cadets	League	Cup	Challenge	Best Youth Club
1970–71	—N/a	—N/a	—N/a	—N/a	—N/a	—N/a	—N/a	—N/a	—N/a	—N/a	—N/a	—N/a	—N/a	—N/a
1971–72	D3	11th	W	—N/a	—N/a	—N/a	SF	—N/a	—N/a	—N/a	—N/a	—N/a	—N/a	—N/a
1972–73	—N/a	—N/a	W	—N/a	—N/a	—N/a	—N/a	—N/a	—N/a	—N/a	—N/a	—N/a	—N/a	—N/a
1973–74	—N/a	—N/a	—N/a	—N/a	—N/a	—N/a	—N/a	—N/a	—N/a	—N/a	—N/a	—N/a	—N/a	—N/a
1974–75	D3	3rd	—N/a	—N/a	—N/a	—N/a	SF	—N/a	—N/a	—N/a	—N/a	—N/a	—N/a	—N/a
1975–76	D3	3rd	—N/a	—N/a	—N/a	—N/a	—N/a	—N/a	—N/a	—N/a	—N/a	—N/a	—N/a	—N/a
1976–77	D3	11th	—N/a	—N/a	—N/a	—N/a	—N/a	—N/a	—N/a	—N/a	—N/a	—N/a	—N/a	—N/a
1977–78	D3	2nd	—N/a	—N/a	—N/a	—N/a	RU	—N/a	—N/a	—N/a	—N/a	—N/a	—N/a	—N/a
1978–79	D3	5th	—N/a	—N/a	—N/a	—N/a	—N/a	—N/a	—N/a	—N/a	—N/a	—N/a	—N/a	—N/a
1979–80	D3	6th	W	—N/a	—N/a	—N/a	—N/a	—N/a	—N/a	RU	—N/a	—N/a	—N/a	—N/a
1980–81	D3	4th	—N/a	—N/a	—N/a	—N/a	R1	—N/a	—N/a	—N/a	—N/a	—N/a	—N/a	—N/a
1981–82	D3	3rd	—N/a	—N/a	—N/a	—N/a	R16	—N/a	—N/a	—N/a	—N/a	—N/a	—N/a	—N/a
1982–83	D3	10th	—N/a	—N/a	—N/a	—N/a	R16	—N/a	—N/a	—N/a	—N/a	—N/a	—N/a	—N/a
1983–84	D3	7th	—N/a	—N/a	—N/a	—N/a	R32	—N/a	—N/a	—N/a	—N/a	—N/a	—N/a	—N/a
1984–85	D3	9th	—N/a	—N/a	—N/a	—N/a	—N/a	—N/a	—N/a	—N/a	—N/a	—N/a	—N/a	—N/a
1985–86	D3	6th	—N/a	—N/a	—N/a	—N/a	SF	—N/a	—N/a	—N/a	—N/a	—N/a	—N/a	—N/a
1986–87	D3	SF	—N/a	—N/a	—N/a	—N/a	R32	—N/a	—N/a	—N/a	—N/a	—N/a	—N/a	—N/a
1987–88	D3	2nd	—N/a	—N/a	—N/a	—N/a	R32	—N/a	—N/a	W	—N/a	—N/a	—N/a	—N/a
1988–89	D3	3rd	—N/a	—N/a	—N/a	—N/a	RU	—N/a	—N/a	—N/a	—N/a	—N/a	—N/a	W
1989–90	D3	6th	—N/a	—N/a	—N/a	—N/a	SF	—N/a	—N/a	—N/a	—N/a	—N/a	—N/a	—N/a
1990–91	D3	5th	—N/a	—N/a	—N/a	—N/a	W	—N/a	—N/a	—N/a	—N/a	—N/a	—N/a	—N/a
1991–92	D3	4th	—N/a	—N/a	—N/a	—N/a	R16	—N/a	—N/a	—N/a	—N/a	—N/a	—N/a	—N/a
1992–93	D3	12th	—N/a	—N/a	—N/a	—N/a	R64	—N/a	—N/a	—N/a	—N/a	—N/a	—N/a	—N/a
1993–94	CN1	6th	—N/a	—N/a	—N/a	—N/a	R32	—N/a	—N/a	—N/a	—N/a	—N/a	—N/a	—N/a
1994–95	CN1	3rd	—N/a	—N/a	—N/a	—N/a	R32	—N/a	—N/a	—N/a	—N/a	—N/a	—N/a	—N/a
1995–96	CN1	5th	—N/a	—N/a	—N/a	—N/a	R32	—N/a	—N/a	—N/a	—N/a	—N/a	—N/a	—N/a
1996–97	CN1	13th	—N/a	—N/a	—N/a	—N/a	R16	—N/a	—N/a	—N/a	—N/a	—N/a	—N/a	—N/a
1997–98	CN1	7th	—N/a	—N/a	—N/a	—N/a	RU	—N/a	—N/a	—N/a	—N/a	—N/a	—N/a	—N/a
1998–99	CN1	13th	—N/a	—N/a	—N/a	—N/a	R64	—N/a	—N/a	—N/a	—N/a	—N/a	—N/a	—N/a
1999–2000	CN1	12th	—N/a	—N/a	—N/a	—N/a	QF	—N/a	—N/a	—N/a	—N/a	—N/a	—N/a	—N/a
2000–01	CN1	5th	—N/a	—N/a	—N/a	—N/a	SF	—N/a	—N/a	—N/a	—N/a	—N/a	—N/a	—N/a
2001–02	CN1	9th	—N/a	—N/a	—N/a	—N/a	R64	—N/a	—N/a	—N/a	—N/a	—N/a	—N/a	—N/a
2002–03	CN1	SF	—N/a	—N/a	—N/a	—N/a	R32	—N/a	—N/a	—N/a	—N/a	—N/a	—N/a	—N/a
2003–04	CN1	6th	—N/a	—N/a	—N/a	—N/a	R64	—N/a	—N/a	—N/a	—N/a	—N/a	—N/a	—N/a
2004–05	CN1	15th	—N/a	—N/a	—N/a	—N/a	—N/a	—N/a	—N/a	—N/a	—N/a	—N/a	—N/a	—N/a
2005–06	CN1	8th	—N/a	—N/a	—N/a	W	R32	—N/a	—N/a	—N/a	—N/a	—N/a	—N/a	—N/a
2006–07	CN1	13th	—N/a	—N/a	—N/a	—N/a	—N/a	—N/a	—N/a	—N/a	—N/a	—N/a	—N/a	—N/a
2007–08	CN1	7th	—N/a	—N/a	—N/a	—N/a	R64	—N/a	RU	—N/a	—N/a	—N/a	—N/a	—N/a
2008–09	CN1	11th	—N/a	—N/a	—N/a	—N/a	QF	—N/a	—N/a	—N/a	—N/a	—N/a	—N/a	—N/a
2009–10	CN1	4th	—N/a	—N/a	—N/a	W	R64	—N/a	RU	—N/a	—N/a	—N/a	—N/a	—N/a
2010–11	CN1	8th	—N/a	—N/a	—N/a	W	R32	—N/a	W	—N/a	2nd	—N/a	—N/a	W
2011–12	CN1	14th	—N/a	—N/a	—N/a	RU	R16	—N/a	—N/a	—N/a	2nd	—N/a	—N/a	—N/a
2012–13	CN1	8th	—N/a	—N/a	—N/a	4th	SF	—N/a	3rd	—N/a	5th	—N/a	—N/a	W
2013–14	CN1	9th	—N/a	—N/a	—N/a	—N/a	R32	QF	RU	—N/a	RU	—N/a	—N/a	W
2014–15	CN1	3rd	—N/a	—N/a	—N/a	—N/a	SF	GS	RU	—N/a	RU	—N/a	—N/a	—N/a
2015–16	CN1	7th	—N/a	—N/a	—N/a	W	R32	RU	W	—N/a	W	—N/a	—N/a	—N/a
2016–17	CN1	10th	—N/a	—N/a	—N/a	—N/a	QF	R16	W	—N/a	W	—N/a	—N/a	—N/a
2017–18	CN1	8th	—N/a	—N/a	—N/a	—N/a	R2	R16	SF	—N/a	RU	—N/a	—N/a	—N/a
2018–19	CN1	13th	—N/a	—N/a	GS	2nd	R2	PO	—N/a	—N/a	W	—N/a	—N/a	—N/a
2019–20	—N/a	—N/a	—N/a	—N/a	GS	2nd	QF	GS	—N/a	—N/a	—N/a	—N/a	—N/a	—N/a
2020–21	—N/a	—N/a	—N/a	—N/a	GS	1st	—N/a	R64	2nd	—N/a	—N/a	—N/a	—N/a	—N/a
2021–22	—N/a	—N/a	—N/a	—N/a	—N/a	SF	R3	QF	SF	—N/a	2nd	—N/a	—N/a	—N/a
2022–23	—N/a	—N/a	—N/a	—N/a	GS	RU	R2	R16	2nd	—N/a	2nd	—N/a	—N/a	—N/a
2023–24	—N/a	—N/a	—N/a	—N/a	—N/a	W	R32	GS	2nd	—N/a	2nd	—N/a	—N/a	—N/a
2024–25	—N/a	—N/a	—N/a	6th	—N/a	W	R2	LP	3rd	—N/a	W	—N/a	—N/a	—N/a
2025–26	—N/a	—N/a	—N/a	8th	GS	W	W	SF	W	—N/a	2nd	W	—N/a	—N/a
2026–27	—N/a	—N/a	—N/a	TBD	TBD	TBD	TBD	TBD	TBD	—N/a	TBD	TBD	TBD	—N/a

=== Competitive record ===
As of 22 November 2026.

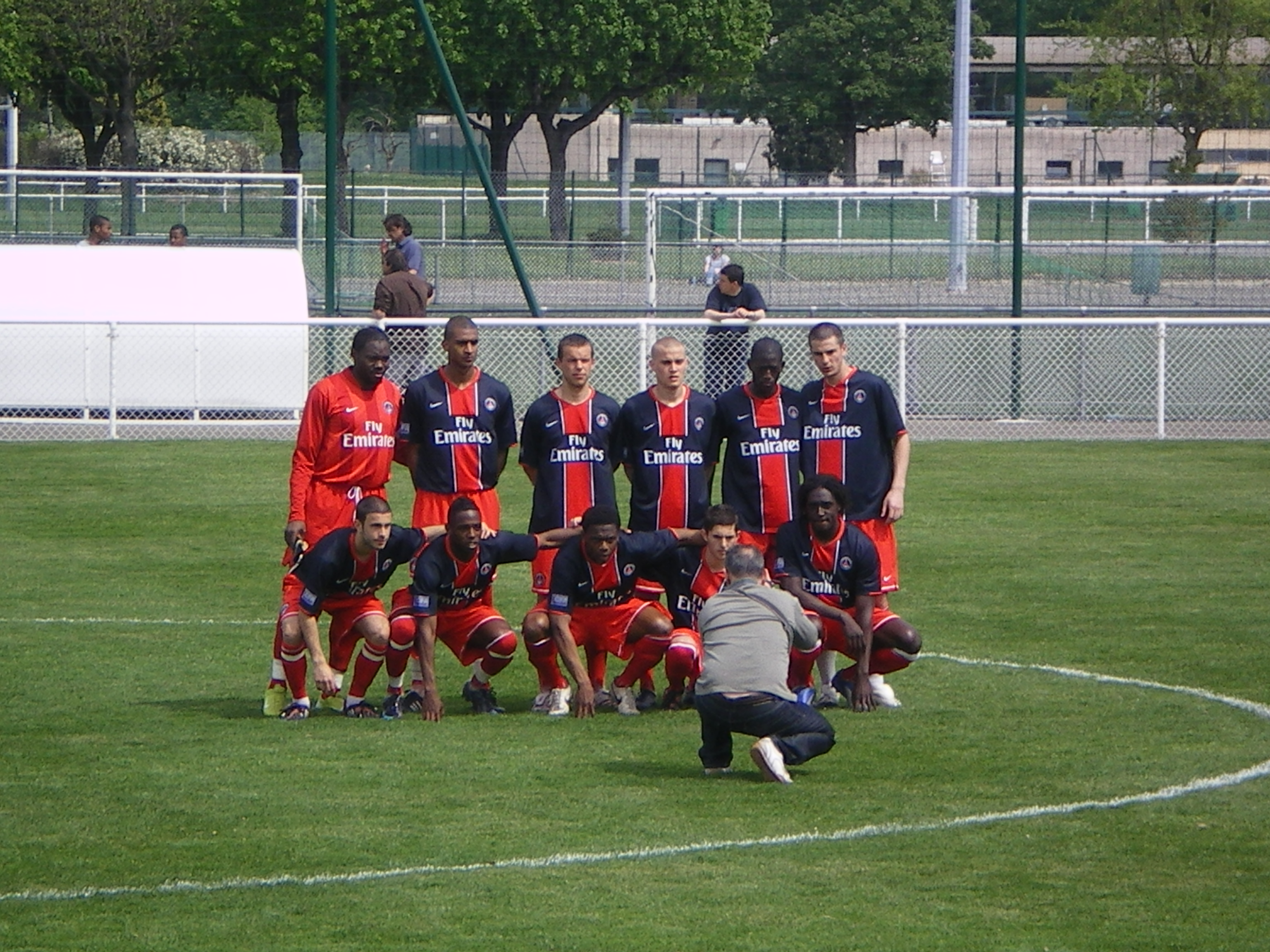
PSG's former reserve team in May 2008.

Competition	MP	W	D	L	GF	GA	GD	WP%
Men's Reserve
Division 3	596	261	171	164	1,008	718	+290	43.79
Championnat National 1	855	308	263	284	1,136	1,040	+96	36.02
Coupe de Paris	7	6	1	0	14	1	+13	85.71
Men's Espoirs
Challenge Espoirs	13	3	1	9	15	28	−13	23.08
Premier League International Cup	17	3	3	11	24	41	−17	17.65
Men's Under-19
Championnat National U19	216	144	33	39	589	244	+345	66.67
Coupe Gambardella	144	84	35	25	332	137	+195	58.33
UEFA Youth League	93	45	21	27	199	140	+59	48.39
Men's Under-17
Championnat National U17	172	111	31	30	503	222	+281	64.53
Championnat National des Cadets	2	1	0	1	2	1	+1	50.00
Women's Under-19
Championnat National Féminin U19	268	218	19	31	1,031	236	+795	81.34
Coupe Nike Féminine U18	6	5	1	0	32	3	+29	83.33
Challenge Espoirs LFFP	1	1	0	0	3	0	+3	100.00

== Honours ==
As of 2025–26 Championnat National U17.

Type	Competitions	Titles	Seasons
Regional
Regional	Coupe de Paris	3	1971–72, 1972–73, 1979–80
National	Championnat National U19	7	2005–06, 2009–10, 2010–11, 2015–16, 2023–24, 2024–25, 2025–26
National	Coupe Gambardella	2	1990–91, 2025–26
National	Championnat National U17	4	2010–11, 2015–16, 2016–17, 2025–26
National	Championnat National des Cadets	1	1987–88
National	Championnat National Féminin U19	4	2015–16, 2016–17, 2018–19, 2024–25
National	Coupe Nike Féminine U18	1	2025–26
National	Best Youth Club	4	1989, 2011, 2013, 2014

== Players ==
As of 2 September 2026.

=== Men's Espoirs ===
Note: Flags indicate national team as defined under FIFA eligibility rules; some limited exceptions apply. Players may hold more than one non-FIFA nationality.

No.	Pos.	Nation	Player
—	GK	FRA	Bryan Francilonne
—	GK	ITA	Alessandro Longoni
—	GK	FRA	Arthur Vignaud
—	DF	FRA	Yanis Bastaraud
—	DF	FRA	David Boly
—	DF	FRA	Djamy Olax
—	DF	FRA	Dimitri Lucea
—	DF	COD	Hermi M’Futila
—	DF	FRA	Emmanuel Nzala
—	MF	FRA	Rayan Abo El Nay
—	MF	FRA	Paul Caumeil

No.	Pos.	Nation	Player
—	MF	COD	Vainqueur Diyinu Nzinga
—	MF	ESP	Abdou Fanné-Dramé
—	MF	MAR	Younes Idder
—	MF	BEL	Ilian Mhand
—	MF	CIV	Landry N’Dri N'Guessan
—	FW	FRA	Adam Ayari
—	FW	FRA	Noa Bezeme
—	FW	CPV	Fabio Domingos
—	FW	FRA	Ethan Luvambano
—	FW	POR	Daniel Marques

=== Men's Under-19 ===
Note: Flags indicate national team as defined under FIFA eligibility rules; some limited exceptions apply. Players may hold more than one non-FIFA nationality.

No.	Pos.	Nation	Player
—	GK	FRA	Arthur Bar
—	GK	FRA	Abdallah Benaired
—	GK	MAR	Adam Mouak
—	GK	COM	Ilian Saleh
—	DF	FRA	Lucas Batbedat
—	DF	FRA	Charles Bouygue
—	DF	FRA	Kemokho Gassama
—	DF	CIV	Léo Gnahoré
—	DF	FRA	Axel Koukaba
—	DF	FRA	Jarell Paisley
—	MF	FRA	Paul Bourdin
—	MF	FRA	Trevis Diasivi

No.	Pos.	Nation	Player
—	MF	FRA	Bakoutoubo Dramé
—	MF	TUN	Edem Ghalleb
—	MF	FRA	Lorenzo Kana-Biyik
—	MF	FRA	Nahil Kanté
—	MF	FRA	Seydou Konaté
—	MF	TUN	Wassim Slama
—	MF	FRA	Moïse Talanga
—	FW	FRA	Noah Adnane
—	FW	FRA	Camron Delgado
—	FW	FRA	Toumani Diagouraga
—	FW	FRA	Mamadou Meïté
—	FW	FRA	Noha Tiehi

=== Men's Under-17 ===
Note: Flags indicate national team as defined under FIFA eligibility rules; some limited exceptions apply. Players may hold more than one non-FIFA nationality.

No.	Pos.	Nation	Player
—	GK	FRA	Maxime Astruc
—	GK	FRA	Arthur Bar
—	DF	FRA	Jordan Gervelain
—	DF	FRA	Nicolas Gomes
—	DF	FRA	Harryl Mboma
—	DF	FRA	Hermance Mbongo
—	MF	FRA	Kenji Anastase
—	MF	MAR	Jebril Doukkali
—	MF	USA	Élie Karim

No.	Pos.	Nation	Player
—	MF	FRA	Ewan Polter
—	MF	FRA	Claude-Eriel Tsamoukounou
—	MF	FRA	Irvine Wenge
—	FW	FRA	Jouhayni Abdoun
—	FW	MAR	Abde-Chahid El Mezouari
—	FW	FRA	Kenzo Kana-Biyik
—	FW	FRA	Nathan Mboumba
—	FW	FRA	Maoula Niakaté
—	FW	FRA	Souleyman Zeghadi

=== Women's Under-19 ===
Note: Flags indicate national team as defined under FIFA eligibility rules; some limited exceptions apply. Players may hold more than one non-FIFA nationality.

No.	Pos.	Nation	Player
—	GK	FRA	Jade Dubois
—	GK	FRA	Nina Rousselot
—	DF	FRA	Mélia Bourdoncle
—	DF	FRA	Lahna Diawara
—	DF	FRA	Olivia Romiti
—	DF	FRA	Médina Belaïd
—	DF	FRA	Noémie Fatier
—	DF	FRA	Dalo Jabbie
—	DF	FRA	Gloria Bekoundou
—	DF	FRA	Imène Diyen
—	DF	FRA	Mélissa Esdras
—	DF	FRA	Kaïna Siewe Bakop
—	DF	FRA	Paris-Emilie Daramola
—	MF	FRA	Katia Imarazene
—	MF	FRA	Lina Greve Chaib
—	MF	FRA	Stella Maignan

No.	Pos.	Nation	Player
—	MF	FRA	Tanté Diakité
—	MF	FRA	Kadiatou Diarra
—	MF	FRA	Sofia Djoubri
—	MF	FRA	Aliya Flament
—	MF	FRA	Gabrielle Le Roux
—	MF	FRA	Clothilde Frerejean
—	MF	FRA	Nessma Mouradi
—	MF	FRA	Diénébou Niakaté
—	FW	FRA	Naolia Traoré
—	FW	FRA	Auryane Abdourahim
—	FW	FRA	Ornella Graziani
—	FW	MAR	Lina Mokhtar Jamai
—	FW	FRA	Léa Morissaint
—	FW	FRA	Aya Ait Khouya Mouh
—	FW	FRA	Marie Estella Lafontaine
—	FW	FRA	Candice Thomas

== Titi d'Or ==
The Titi d'Or is an annual award presented by Les Titis du PSG to the most promising male and female players in the PSG Academy, as voted for by their peers. Les Titis du PSG is an association affiliated with PSG that covers the club's academy. All previous recipients have gone on to become professional footballers, with many later representing PSG's first team. The award has been presented to male players since 2007, except in 2010 due to the transfer of the Les Titis du PSG website. A women's award was introduced in 2019. Hervin Ongenda and Kingsley Coman are the only players to have won the Titi d'Or twice. Since 2021, previous winners have not been eligible to receive the award a second time. In February 2025, during the 2024 ceremony, PSG and Les Titis du PSG paid tribute to the late Moroccan midfielder Abdelaziz Barrada, the inaugural recipient of the award in 2007.

Initially decided by public vote, the Titi d'Or has been determined by peer voting since 2011. Players from PSG's U17, U19 and Espoirs teams cast secret ballots ranking the three candidates they consider most deserving of the award, while the women's U19 players vote for the female recipient. Votes are allocated on a 5–3–1 points system, with five points awarded for a first-place vote, three for second place and one for third. The players with the highest point totals are declared the winners. In the event of a tie, the player with the most first-place votes receives the award. Male players are eligible only if they have made no more than 20 appearances for PSG's first team or in professional football.

=== Winners ===
As of 2025 Titi d'Or.

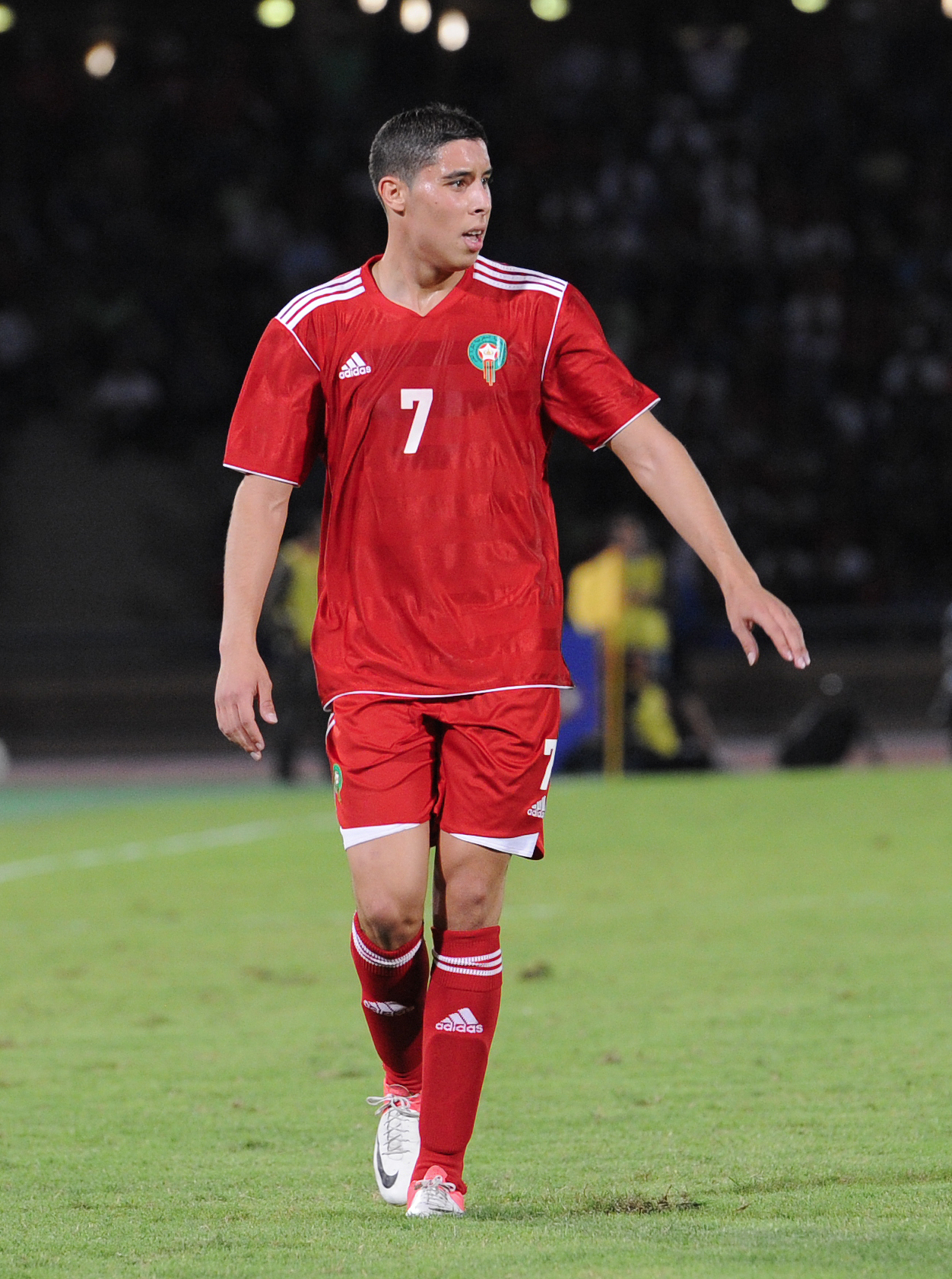
Abdelaziz Barrada won the inaugural Titi d'Or award in 2007.

Edition	Men	Women
2007	(Morocco) Abdelaziz Barrada	—N/a
2008	(France) Hervin Ongenda	—N/a
2009	(France) Alphonse Areola	—N/a
2010	—N/a	—N/a
2011	(France) Hervin Ongenda (2)	—N/a
2012	(France) Kingsley Coman	—N/a
2013	(France) Kingsley Coman (2)	—N/a
2014	(France) Jean-Kévin Augustin	—N/a
2015	(France) Odsonne Édouard	—N/a
2016	(France) Moussa Diaby	—N/a
2017	(France) Yacine Adli	—N/a
2018	(Burkina Faso) Arthur Zagré	—N/a
2019	(France) Tanguy Nianzou	(France) Vicki Bècho
2020	(France) Arnaud Kalimuendo	(France) Hawa Sangaré
2021	(France) Ayman Kari	(France) Manssita Traoré
2022	(France) Warren Zaïre-Emery	(Haiti) Océane Toussaint
2023	(France) Senny Mayulu	(France) Naolia Traoré
2024	(Senegal) Ibrahim Mbaye	(France) Alyssa Fernandes
2025	(France) Quentin Ndjantou	(France) Anaïs Ebayilin

== Association Paris Saint-Germain ==
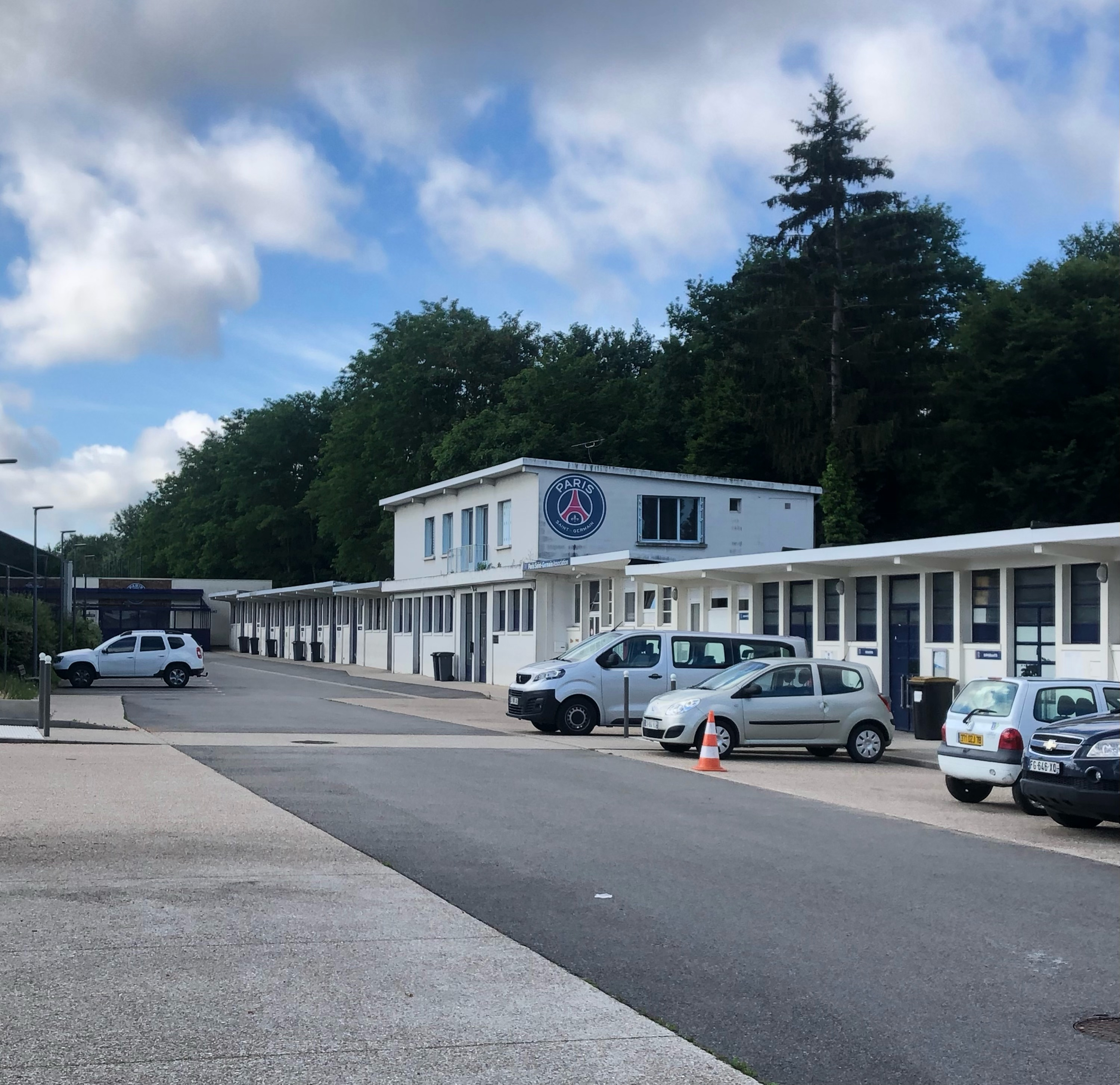
Association PSG at the Camp des Loges in 2022.

The Association Paris Saint-Germain Football Club, Association loi 1901, created on 12 August 1970, formalized the club's foundation. This nonprofit organization, based at the Camp des Loges, operates the amateur section of Paris Saint-Germain, which includes elite youth players, both male and female, through the PSG Youth Academy, as well as senior, veteran, and young adult players from the Paris Region in separate teams. Therefore, all PSG players, except those of the two professional teams, are under the supervision of the association.

Previously, the Association PSG managed the club's amateur and professional activities for two decades. When Canal+ acquired PSG in May 1991, it created the Société Anonyme Sportive Professionnelle Paris Saint-Germain Football (SASP, i.e., professional sports public limited company). Now two independent entities, each with a different president, the association transferred the professional section to the SASP, but still holds the membership number to the French Football Federation and retains the control of the amateur section. The two organizations signed a new 10-year agreement in 2019.

Between 1970 and 2012, the club's professional section only included the men's team, Paris Saint-Germain FC. Founded in 1971, the women's team, Paris Saint-Germain FC (women), was initially amateur. When the team became professional in September 2012, it separated from the association and became part of the SASP. Currently, the club's amateur section is composed of the men's and women's teams of the PSG Youth Academy.

The Association PSG has had nine presidents. Benoît Rousseau is the current president. He has held the position since December 2012. Pierre-Étienne Guyot was the first president of both the association and the SASP, while Simon Tahar was the last to preside over both simultaneously, as well as the first women's team. Alain Cayzac also held both positions. He was president of the association between 2001 and 2006, and then president of the SASP between 2006 and 2008.

=== Presidents ===
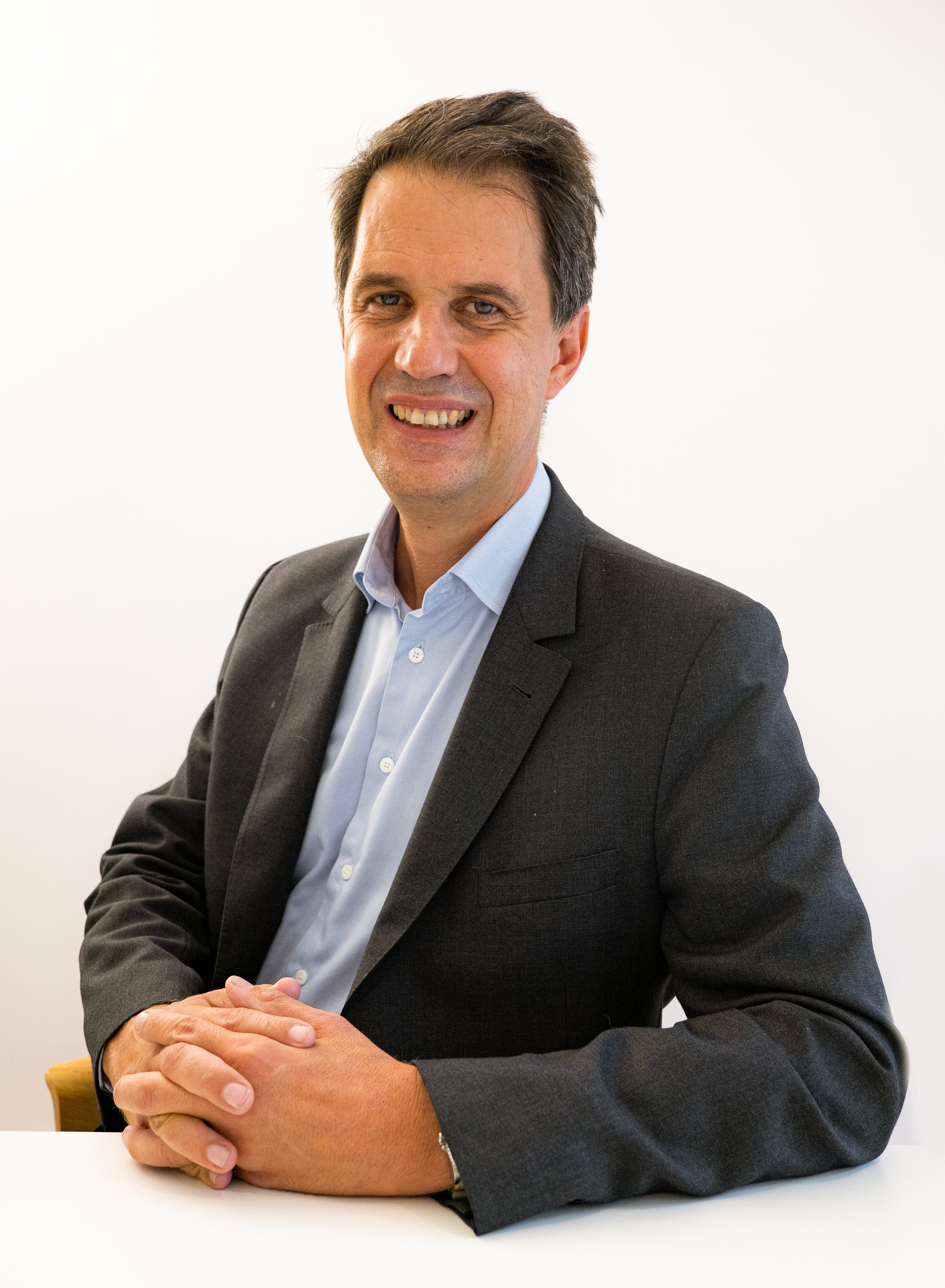
Benoît Rousseau

As of December 2012.

No.	President	Tenure
1	(France) Pierre-Étienne Guyot	Jun. 1970 – Jun. 1971
2	(France) Guy Crescent	Jun. 1971 – Dec. 1971
3	(France) Henri Patrelle	Dec. 1971 – Jun. 1974
4	(France) Daniel Hechter	Jun. 1974 – Jan. 1978
5	(France) Francis Borelli	Jan. 1978 – May 1991
6	(France) Bernard Brochand	May 1991 – Jun. 2001
7	(France) Alain Cayzac	Jun. 2001 – Jun. 2006
8	(France) Simon Tahar	Jun. 2006 – Dec. 2012
9	(France) Benoît Rousseau	Dec. 2012 – Present

== Personnel ==
=== Management ===
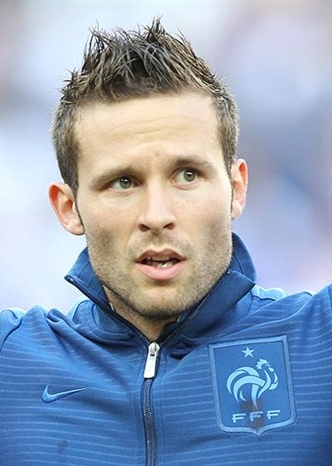
Yohan Cabaye

Position	Name	Source
President	(France) Benoît Rousseau	
General secretary	(France) Thierry Morin	
Sporting director	(France) Yohan Cabaye	
Men's technical director	(France) Mathieu Le Scornet	
Women's technical director	(France) Sonia Haziraj	
Scouting director	(France) Pierre Reynaud	
Head of performance	(France) Denis Lefebve	

=== Technical staff ===
Position	Name	Source
Men's Espoirs head coach	(France) Jean-François Vulliez	
Men's U19 head coach	(France) Thomas Leyssales	
Men's U17 head coach	(France) Youcef Bouamrane	
Women's U19 head coach	(France) Bernard Mendy	
