= Rebecca Makonnen =

Canadian television and radio broadcaster

Rebecca Makonnen is a Canadian television and radio broadcaster, currently host of the weekly talk and interview series De l'huile sur le feu on Ici Radio-Canada Première.

== Background ==
She was born in Ethiopia to Adunya Makonnen, a medical doctor married to Virginie Michaud, a Canadian nurse from New Brunswick who was working in the country.

Despite having grown up in Quebec with Michaud, her 2024 autobiography Dans mon sang publicly revealed for the first time that Michaud was not her biological mother, and in fact she had been conceived in an extramarital affair that her father had with another woman while Michaud had traveled back to Canada for an extended visit prior to divorcing Adunya. Despite this, Michaud actively asked for custody of Rebecca following the divorce, and raised her in a loving household; Makonnen has stated that she considers Michaud to be her real mother regardless of the situation, and never experienced any desire to meet or connect with her biological mother.

== Career ==
After studying journalism at Concordia University, she began her career as a production assistant at MusiquePlus in 1999, transitioning to an on-air role as a VJ and reporter in 2000. In 2006 she joined TQS as a reporter on the entertainment news magazine Flash, and joined Radio-Canada in 2008 as an arts reporter for the Ici Radio-Canada Première morning show C'est bien meilleur le matin and the Ici Radio-Canada Télé arts magazine On fait tous du show business, and host of the music television show Studio 12.

She subsequently hosted Circuit Makonnen on the Ici Musique network from 2012 to 2017, and has continued to host both radio and television programming for Radio-Canada. She also voiced the character of Ana Harvey in the French version of the animated television series Doomsday Brothers (Les Frères Apocalypse).

== Personal life ==
She has been in a relationship with singer-songwriter Louis-Jean Cormier since the late 2010s. They keep their relationship relatively private, although she was the inspiration for some of the songs on his 2020 album Quand la nuit tombe.

She was previously romantically linked with electronic musician Maxime "DJ Champion" Morin.
