= Benoît Rousseau =

French financial analyst

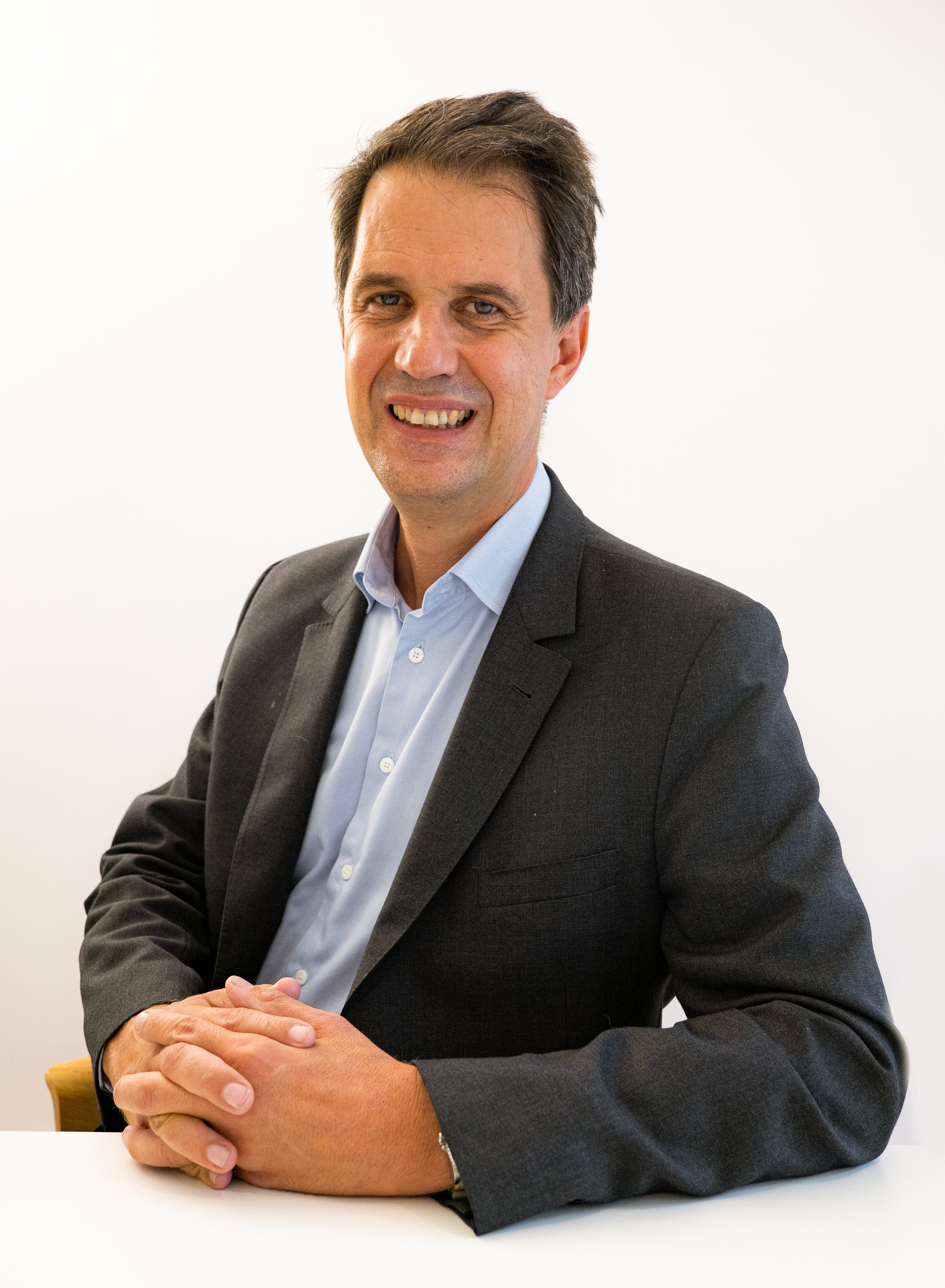
- Rousseau in 2020
- Born: 1967 or 1968 (age 58–59); France
- Occupations: Accountant, business executive
- Known for: Former president of Paris Saint-Germain F.C. (2011)

Benoît Rousseau (born 1967/1968) is a French accountant and business executive. He worked as financial director of football club Paris Saint-Germain F.C. from 1996 to 1998, and was then a financial advisor to Lille OSC, OGC Nice, AS Saint-Étienne, FC Nantes and RC Strasbourg Alsace. Formerly a president of Paris Saint-Germain, Rousseau is president of the Association Paris Saint-Germain since 2012.

== Career ==
From 1996 to 1998, Rousseau worked as a financial director for Paris Saint-Germain.

On 13 July 2011, he was named interim president of PSG by the new Qatar Sports Investments (QSi) ownership, succeeding Robin Leproux. An article in Le Parisien on 1 October said "His strength is being discreet. Most supporters have never seen his face or heard his voice. His three-month interim reign has included a historic transfer window, but no talk of him. In mid-October, he would abandon the hotseat with a sense of mission accomplished, because he is a man who "prefers to stay out of the spotlight". He was succeeded by QSi president Nasser Al-Khelaifi.

In December 2012, Rousseau became president of the Association Paris Saint-Germain.
