= Alkass International Cup =

Youth football tournament in Qatar

- Organiser(s): Alkass Sports; Aspire Zone; Qatar Football Association
- Founded: 2012
- Region: Qatar
- Teams: 12
- Current champions: (Spain) Real Madrid (3rd title)
- Most championships: (France) Paris Saint-Germain (Spain) Real Madrid (3 titles each)
- Broadcaster: Alkass Sports
- Website: https://internationalcup.alkass.net

The Alkass International Cup is an annual under-17 football tournament hosted in Doha, Qatar. It brings together some of the best under-17 teams of clubs around the world. The competition ran from 2012 to 2020 before returning in 2025.

== Format ==
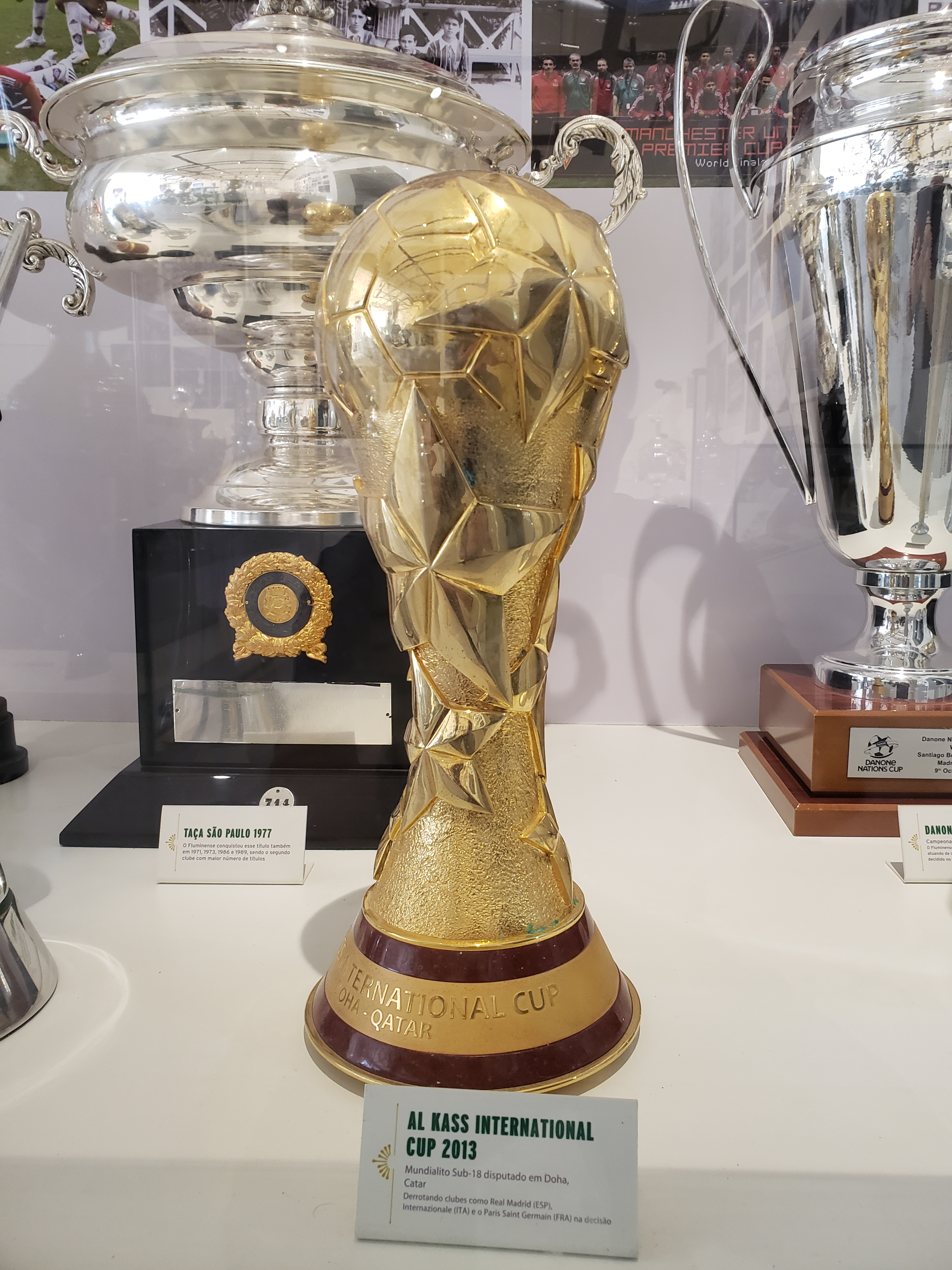
The tournament's trophy

Until its indefinite suspension in 2020, the Alkass International Cup was played across 11 days typically in January and February, with 12 participants split into 4 groups of 3 teams. The first 2 teams in each group advanced to the quarter-finals, while the 3rd place teams participated in the 9th-12th place play-offs. After the quarter-finals, 4 teams advanced to the semi-finals, while the 4 others played in the 5th-8th place play-offs. Finally, after the semi-finals, 2 teams advanced to the final match, while the other 2 played in the 3rd place playoff. The winner of the final was crowned champion.

The 2025 edition of the Alkass International Cup included 8 teams split into 2 groups, followed by semi-finals, a third-place match, and a final.

== Broadcasters ==
The Alkass International Cup is broadcast by the organizing body of the cup, Alkass Sports. In Europe, it was also broadcast by Eurosport 2.

== Performances by teams ==
Alkass International Cup winners by team
Team	Winners	Runners-up	3rd place	4th place	Years won	Years runner-up	Years 3rd place	Years 4th place
(France) Paris Saint-Germain	3	2	1		2012, 2015, 2018	2013, 2025	2020	
(Spain) Real Madrid	3	2			2017, 2020, 2025	2014, 2016		
Aspire International	2			1	2014, 2016			2019
(Brazil) Fluminense	1			1	2013			2014
(Scotland) Rangers	1		1		2019		2025	
(Italy) Inter Milan		1	1	1		2020	2016	2013
(Japan) Kashiwa Reysol		1	1			2018	2019	
(Italy) Juventus		1				2012		
(Brazil) São Paulo		1				2015		
Aspire Qatar		1				2017		
(Italy) Roma		1				2019		
(Italy) AC Milan			1	1			2014	2015
(Austria) Red Bull Salzburg			1	1			2017	2016
(Netherlands) Ajax			1				2012	
(Argentina) Boca Juniors			1				2013	
(England) Arsenal			1				2015	
(Portugal) Benfica			1				2018	
(Japan) Kashima Antlers				1				2012
(Germany) Eintracht Frankfurt				1				2017
(Tunisia) ES Tunis				1				2018
(Morocco) Mohamed VI Academy				1				2020
(United States) Seattle Sounders FC				1				2025
