= Sonia Haziraj =

French footballer (born 1980)

Personal information
- Date of birth: 15 June 1980 (age 46)
- Place of birth: Melun, France
- Height: 1.63 m (5 ft 4 in)
- Position: Midfielder

International career
| Years | Team | Apps | (Gls) |
| 2008 | France | 1 | (0) |

Managerial career
- France (women U-19)

Sonia Haziraj (born 15 June 1980) is a French former football player who played as a midfielder for French club FCF Juvisy of the Division 1 Féminine and currently works as a football coach.

== Coaching career ==
Since retiring from professional football Haziraj has become the coach of the France women's national under-19 football team.
