= Championnat National U17 =

Youth football league in France

- Organising body: French Football Federation (FFF)
- Founded: 1990 (officially); 2009 (as Championnat National U17)
- Country: France (83 teams)
- Other club(s) from: Monaco (1 team)
- Level on pyramid: 1 (of under-17 age group)
- Relegation to: Regional leagues
- Current champions: Troyes (1st title) (2024–25)
- Most championships: Lyon (4 titles)
- Website: Championnat National U17

The Championnat National U17 is the highest tier of under-17 football in France. Organized by the French Football Federation, it is contested by 84 clubs that are split into 6 groups.

== History ==
In 2009, the Championnat National 16 ans was renamed the Championnat National U17. A under-15 (moins de 15 ans) league existed from 1990 to 1999, and a 15 ans league from 1999 to 2002. The Championnat National U17 became the continuation for these competitions.

Period	Name of the competition	Age category
1990–1996	Championnat National des moins de 15 ans	Players turning 16 on or after 1 August of the year the competition ends
1996–1999	Championnat National des moins de 15 ans	Players turning 16 on or after 1 January of the year the competition ends
1999–2002	Championnat National des 15 ans	Players turning 16 on or after 1 January of the year the competition ends
2002–2009	Championnat National 16 ans	Players turning 17 on or after 1 January of the year the competition ends
2009–present	Championnat National U17	Players turning 17 on or after 1 January of the year the competition ends

== Format ==
The Championnat National U17 is an annual competition that is contested by 84 clubs, with 83 coming from France and 1 from Monaco. The teams are distributed into 6 geographically determined groups of 14 teams. A season starts in the end of summer and ends the following the spring. In the league phase, each team plays each other twice (home and away) in their respective groups for a total of 26 matches played per team. Afterwards, the 6 first-place teams in addition to the 2 best second-place teams face off in a play-off phase. The winner of the final is crowned French under-17 champion.

== Clubs ==
=== 2023–24 season ===
For the 2023–24 season, 84 clubs participate in the Championnat National U17.

Group A	Group B	Group C	Group D	Group E	Group F
Amiens	Bastia	Andrézieux	SC Air Bel	Balma	Angers
Blois	Borgo	Annecy	AC Ajaccio	Bordeaux	Avranches
Caen	Cambrai	Auxerre	Gazélec Ajaccio	Canet Roussillon	Brest
Châteauroux	Drancy	Racing Besançon	Clermont	Castelnau Le Crès	Carquefou
Laval	Épernay	Bourg-en-Bresse	Lyon	Istres	Cholet
Le Havre	Lens	Dijon	Lyon La Duchère	Marmande	Guingamp
Le Mans	Lesquin	FC Lyon	ASPTT Marseille	Marseille	La Roche
Mantes	Lille	Metz	Monaco	Mérignac	Lorient
Montrouge FC 92	FC Montfermeil	Nancy	Nice	Montpellier	Nantes
Orléans	Paris 13 Atletico	Sochaux	Cavigal Nice	Rodez	Niort
Paris FC	Red Star	Strasbourg	Nîmes	Olympique Rovenain	Rennes
Paris Saint-Germain	Reims	Torcy	Saint-Étienne	Entente St Clément Montferrier	TA Rennes
Quevilly-Rouen	AAS Sarcelles	Troyes	Saint-Priest	Toulouse	ES Saintes
Versailles	Valenciennes	Villefranche	Valence	UJS Toulouse	Vertou

=== Performances by club ===
Lyon have won the most titles, with four. The title was not awarded for the 2019–20 and 2020–21 seasons due to the COVID-19 pandemic, and no competition was held for the 1994–95 season.

Championnat National U17 winners by team
Team	Winners	Years won
Lyon	4	1993–94, 1999–2000, 2003–04, 2013–14
Auxerre	3	1990–91, 1995–96, 2002–03
Paris Saint-Germain	3	2010–11, 2015–16, 2016–17
Marseille	3	2007–08, 2008–09, 2022–23
Le Havre	2	1991–92, 1997–98
Metz	2	2004–05, 2006–07
Nantes	2	2005–06, 2018–19
Cannes	1	1992–93
Lille	1	1996–97
Bordeaux	1	1998–99
INF Clairefontaine	1	2000–01
Bastia	1	2001–02
Sochaux	1	2009–10
Lens	1	2011–12
Saint-Étienne	1	2012–13
Lorient	1	2014–15
Rennes	1	2017–18
Toulouse	1	2021–22
Amiens	1	2023–24
Troyes	1	2024–25

== See also ==
- Championnat National U19
