= Challenge Espoirs =

Men's football competition in France

- Organising body: French Football Federation
- Founded: 2024
- Country: France (15 teams)
- Other club(s) from: Monaco (1 team)
- Number of clubs: 16
- Website: fff.fr

The Challenge Espoirs is an annual under-23 men's football competition in France. Created in 2024, it is contested by teams belonging to youth academies of professional clubs.

== History ==
On 27 September 2024, the French Football Federation (FFF) announced the creation of the Challenge Espoirs, with the mission being to "give playing time to young players from the U18 to U23 categories, especially those are part of professional squads of Ligue 1 and Ligue 2 clubs." The first edition, established as an unofficial competition, included twelve teams that belong to youth academies of professional clubs.

On 21 May 2025, the final of the first edition between Monaco and Rennes was abandoned at the 82nd minute due to Monaco's Samuel Nibombé going into cardiac arrest. Although Monaco was leading 2–1 when the match was stopped, no winner was determined.

For the 2025-2026 season, 16 teams are split in 2 groups of 8. The biggest non participating club being Lille OSC. Paris Saint-Germain, Monaco, Rennes and Marseille are favourites.

== Format ==
The competition is contested by twelve teams composed of under-17 through under-23 players. However, there is a maximum of five players that can come from the under-17 and under-18 categories. The first edition was split into two groups of six teams that each compete against each other once, for a total of five matchdays. At the end of the season, the top two teams of each group play semi-finals and a final to determine a champion.

== Reception ==
The creation of the Challenge Espoirs was received with unanimous satisfaction among participants. Some directors, such as Monaco director Sébastien Muet, spoke positively about the competition in the press.

== Clubs ==
2024–25 Challenge Espoirs clubs
Group A	Group B
Le Havre	Ajaccio
Montpellier	Auxerre
Nantes	Caen
Paris Saint-Germain	Monaco
Saint-Étienne	Paris FC
Toulouse	Rennes
