= Championnat National U19 =

French youth association football league

- Organising body: French Football Federation (FFF)
- Founded: 1990 (officially); 2009 (as Championnat National U19)
- Country: France (55 teams)
- Other club from: Monaco (1 team)
- Level on pyramid: 1 (of under-19 age group)
- Relegation to: Regional leagues
- Domestic cup: Coupe Gambardella (1996–2019)
- International cup: UEFA Youth League
- Current champions: Paris Saint-Germain (7th title) (2025–26)
- Most championships: Paris Saint-Germain (7 titles)
- Website: Championnat National U19

The Championnat National U19 is the highest tier of under-19 football in France. Organized by the French Football Federation, it is contested by 56 clubs that are split into 4 groups.

Paris Saint-Germain won the 2025–26 edition for a record seventh title, their third in a row.

== History ==
In 2009, the Championnat National 18 ans of France was renamed Championnat National U19. Before the 18 ans league, a U17 (moins de 17 ans then 17 ans) league existed from 1990 to 2002. The Championnat National U19 became the continuation of the former 17 ans and 18 ans leagues. On the other hand, the Championnat National U17 is a continuation of the former moins de 15 ans league from 1990 to 2002 and the 16 ans league from 2002 to 2009.

Period	Name of the competition	Age category
1990–1996	Championnat National des moins de 17 ans	Players turning 18 on or after 1 August of the year the competition ends
1996–1999	Championnat National des moins de 17 ans	Players turning 18 on or after 1 January of the year the competition ends
1999–2002	Championnat National des 17 ans	Players turning 18 on or after 1 January of the year the competition ends
2002–2009	Championnat National 18 ans	Players turning 19 on or after 1 January of the year the competition ends
2009–present	Championnat National U19	Players turning 19 on or after 1 January of the year the competition ends

== Format ==
The Championnat National U19 is played annually and is contested by 56 clubs, with 55 coming from France and 1 from Monaco. The teams are divided into 4 geographically-determined groups of 14 teams. A season begins in the end of summer and ends in the following spring. In the league phase, every team plays each other twice (home and away) in their respective groups for a total of 26 games played per team. Afterwards, the first and second place teams of each group face off in a play-off phase. The winner of the final is crowned French under-19 champion.

=== European qualification ===
Since 2015, the winner of the Championnat National U19 has qualified for the UEFA Youth League. In a separate path, 3–4 youth teams of Ligue 1 clubs qualified for the UEFA Champions League qualify for the Youth League as well.

== Clubs ==
=== 2021–22 season ===
For the 2021–22 season, 56 clubs participated in the Championnat National U19.

Group A	Group B	Group C	Group D
Amiens	Auxerre	Angers	Ajaccio
Caen	Bourg-en-Bresse	Avranches	Béziers
Chambly	Clermont	Bordeaux	Cannes
Drancy	ASPTT Dijon	Brest	Colomiers
Évreux	Dijon	Concarneau	Istres
Feignies Aulnoye	Lyon	Châteauroux	Marseille
Le Havre	Metz	Guingamp	Monaco
Lens	Nancy	Laval	Montpellier
Lille	Paris FC	Le Mans	Nice
Orléans	Pontarlier	Mérignac	Nîmes
FC Montfermeil	Sochaux	Nantes	ASC Pieve di Lota
Paris Saint-Germain	Strasbourg	Rennes	Saint-Étienne
Saint-Pryvé Saint-Hilaire	Torcy	Tours	Toulon
Valenciennes	Troyes	Vertou	Toulouse

=== Performances by club ===
Paris Saint-Germain have won the most Championnat National U19 titles, with six. They are followed by Lyon, Nantes, Bordeaux, and Rennes, who all have three titles, while Auxerre and Cannes both have two. The title was not awarded for the 2019–20 and 2020–21 seasons due to the COVID-19 pandemic.

Championnat National U19 winners by team
Team	Winners	Runners-up	Years won	Years runner-up
Paris Saint-Germain	7	2	2005–06, 2009–10, 2010–11, 2015–16, 2023–24, 2024–25, 2025–26	2011–12, 2022–23
Lyon	3	4	1992–93, 1999–2000, 2004–05	1998–99, 2002–03, 2003–04, 2015–16
Nantes	3	4	1990–91, 2021–22, 2022–23	2004–05, 2012–13, 2014–15, 2024–25
Bordeaux	3	2	1997–98, 1998–99, 2016–17	2000–01, 2008–09
Rennes	3		2001–02, 2006–07, 2018–19	
Auxerre	2	2	1993–94, 2011–12	1990–91, 2023–24
Cannes	2		1994–95, 1995–96	
Monaco	1	3	2012–13	2005–06, 2009–10, 2021–22
Metz	1	2	2000–01	1993–94, 1995–96
Sochaux	1	1	2002–03	1997–98
Nice	1	1	2003–04	2001–02
Saint-Étienne	1	1	1996–97	2006–07
Montpellier	1	1	2017–18	2018–19
Strasbourg	1		1991–92	
Guingamp	1		2007–08	
Lens	1		2008–09	
Tours	1		2013–14	
Reims	1		2014–15	
Le Havre		2		2007–08, 2016–17
Caen		2		1999–2000, 2017–18
Toulouse		1		1991–92
Nancy		1		1992–93
INF Clairefontaine		1		1994–95
FC Lyon		1		1996–97
Grenoble		1		2010–11
Thonon Evian		1		2013–14
Clermont		1		2025–26

== See also ==
- Coupe Gambardella
- Championnat National U17
