= Remontada =

Remontada may refer to:

- FC Barcelona 6–1 Paris Saint-Germain FC, association football match known as La Remontada
- Remontada, Spanish word for comeback, often associated with association football
- "Remontada", a rap song by Sofiane
