= Paris Saint-Germain FC in international football =

French club in international football

Paris SG in international football
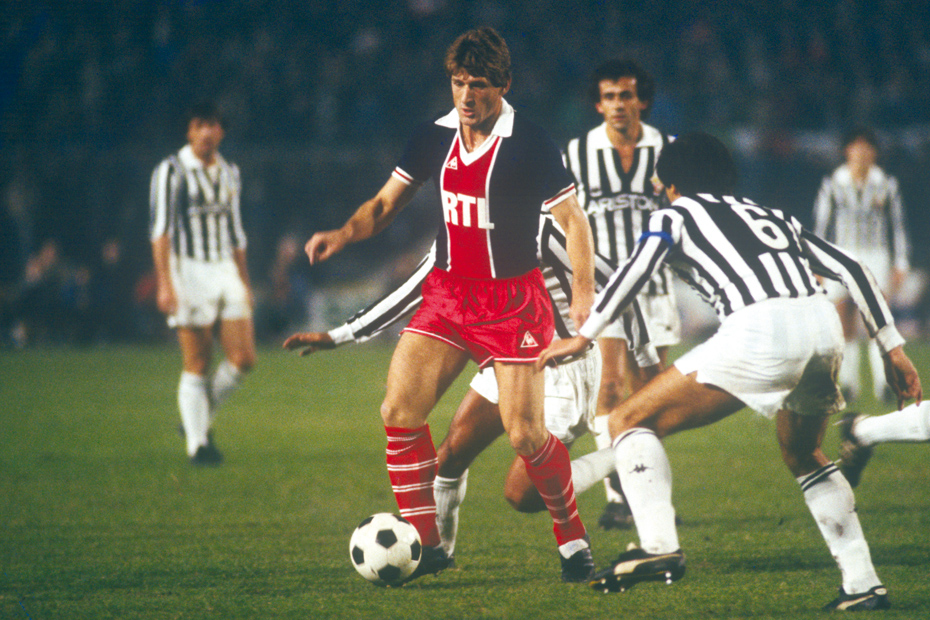
- PSG legend Safet Sušić against Juventus in 1983.
- Club: Paris Saint-Germain
- Most appearances: Marquinhos (133)
- Top scorer: Kylian Mbappé (42)
- First entry: 1982–83 UEFA Cup Winners' Cup
- Latest entry: 2026–27 UEFA Champions League

Titles
- Champions League: 2: 2025; 2026
- Cup Winners' Cup: 1: 1996
- Intertoto Cup: 1: 2001
- Super Cup: 2: 2025; 2026
- Intercontinental Cup: 1: 2025

Paris Saint-Germain FC are the most successful French club in international competitions. They have won six European titles: the UEFA Cup Winners' Cup in 1996, the UEFA Intertoto Cup in 2001, the UEFA Champions League in 2025 and 2026, and the UEFA Super Cup in 2025 and 2026. They also won the FIFA Intercontinental Cup in 2025. PSG are the only French side to have won the Cup Winners' Cup and the first to win the continental treble and the Super Cup. They were runners-up in the 1996 UEFA Super Cup, the 1996–97 UEFA Cup Winners' Cup, the 2019–20 UEFA Champions League, and the 2025 FIFA Club World Cup.

The Parisians made their international debut in the 1982–83 season, qualifying for the now-defunct Cup Winners' Cup as Coupe de France winners. Their first match was against Lokomotiv Sofia and reached the quarter-finals, where they were eliminated by Waterschei Thor. PSG subsequently competed in the UEFA Europa League in the 1984–85 campaign, before taking their first steps in Europe's premier club competition, the Champions League, in the 1986–87 season.

Between 1992 and 1997, the club reached five consecutive semi-finals: three in the Cup Winners' Cup, one in the Champions League, and one in the Europa League. They won their first European trophy by defeating Rapid Wien in the 1996 UEFA Cup Winners' Cup final. This victory allowed PSG to compete in the UEFA Super Cup, where they lost to Juventus. They reached a second consecutive Cup Winners' Cup final in 1997, this time losing to Barcelona. PSG played in the now-defunct Intertoto Cup once. They did so in 2001, winning their second continental trophy against Brescia on away goals in the two-legged final.

PSG reached their first UEFA Champions League final in 2020, where they were defeated by Bayern Munich, marking their first European final appearance since 2001. The club went on to win their first Champions League title in 2025, defeating Inter Milan in the final. As reigning European champions, Paris competed in the FIFA Club World Cup, the UEFA Super Cup and the FIFA Intercontinental Cup. They finished runners-up in the Club World Cup, losing the final to Chelsea, but secured victories in both the Super Cup, defeating Tottenham Hotspur on penalties, and the Intercontinental Cup, also winning on penalties against Flamengo. PSG won a second consecutive Champions League title in 2026, defeating Arsenal in the final on penalties.

== History ==
=== Early days in Europe ===
Paris Saint-Germain won their first major title, the Coupe de France, in 1982. This success opened the doors to Europe for PSG for the first time in their history, securing a place in the 1982–83 UEFA Cup Winners' Cup. PSG were the first Parisian club to play in Europe since the 1960s, when Racing Paris and Stade Français participated in the Inter-Cities Fairs Cup. Expectations were enormous, and PSG strengthened their squad with Kees Kist, Osvaldo Ardiles and Yugoslavian magician Safet Sušić, who remains to this day one of the greatest players in the club's history. They joined an already well-rounded squad, featuring experienced players Dominique Bathenay, Dominique Rocheteau, Mustapha Dahleb and Nambatingue Toko, as well as promising young academy products Luis Fernandez, Jean-Claude Lemoult and Jean-Marc Pilorget.

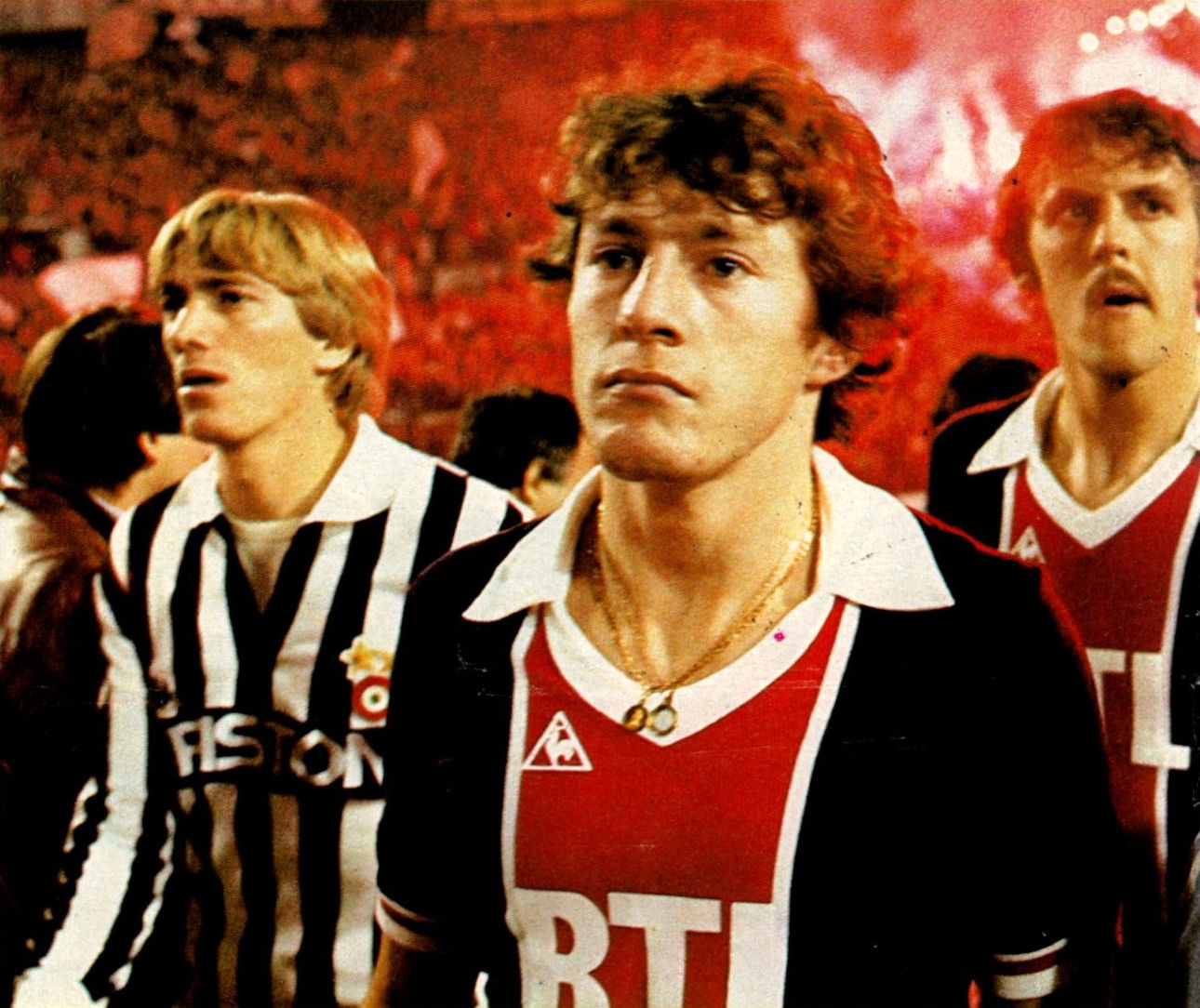
PSG midfielder Luis Fernandez against Juventus in 1983.

The Parisians made their European debut against Lokomotiv Sofia in Bulgaria. Without playmaker Dahleb, they were fortunate to suffer a narrow 1–0 defeat. At the Parc des Princes, Toko scored the club's first goal in European competition, but PSG were on the brink of elimination when Lokomotiv equalized shortly after halftime. They now needed two more goals. Bathenay quickly restored the lead to a PSG side that had to wait until the final ten minutes to seal their thrilling qualification for the round of 16. Toko capitalized on a cross from Pascal Zaremba to score a superb half-volley before Michel N'Gom and Lemoult ended any hopes of a comeback for the visitors with a 5–1 scoreline.

After a comfortable victory over Swansea City, a record 49,575 fans packed the Parc des Princes for their quarter-final clash with Waterschei. PSG's 2–0 victory was well-earned, thanks to Fernandez's outstanding performance and opening goal. They could have scored more and would later regret it, losing the return leg 3–0 in extra time. PSG qualified for the 1983–84 UEFA Cup Winners' Cup after successfully defending their Coupe de France title. Their first-round opponent were Glentoran, whom they beat 4–2 on aggregate to set up a tie against Michel Platini's Juventus. PSG held their own, drawing both legs but bowing out due to the away goals rule against the eventual champions. They came very close to eliminating Juve in the second leg in Turin: a Sušić free kick hit the post and Pilorget missed a clear chance just before the final whistle.

The club's subsequent European adventures would be less glorious. After sweeping Heart of Midlothian on their UEFA Europa League debut in 1984–85, surprise finalists Videoton stunned them in the second round. A 4–2 defeat at the Parc des Princes was followed by a return leg in which the Hungarians won twice. With the home side leading 2–0, the match was called off due to dense fog. Paris had a second chance, but even a replay couldn't save them, and Videoton triumphed 1–0 again. PSG's UEFA Champions League debut was also poor. The French champions fell at the first hurdle to underdogs Vítkovice in 1986–87. PSG's performance in the 1989–90 UEFA Europa League was a mixed bag. They narrowly defeated Kuusysi in the first round, but fell just one goal short of eliminating eventual champions Juventus in the second round.

=== Canal+ takeover and semi-final curse ===
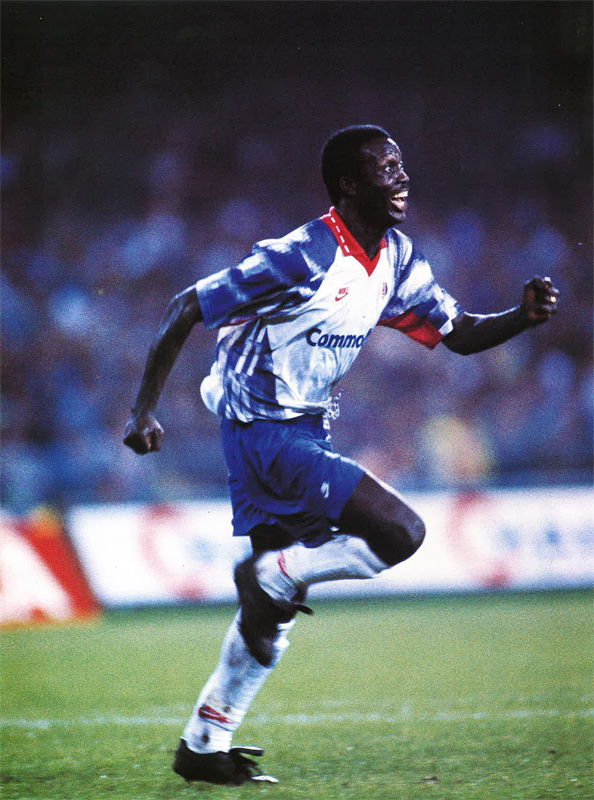
PSG's George Weah in 1992.

Canal+ bought PSG in 1991, completely changing the team's fortunes. They hired Champions League-winning manager Artur Jorge and brought in star players like Raí, Valdo, George Weah, Bernard Lama, Vincent Guérin and David Ginola. PSG's climb to European prominence started in the 1992–93 UEFA Europa League, where they fought their way to the quarter-finals against PAOK, Napoli and Anderlecht, before facing Real Madrid.

PSG lost 3–1 at the Santiago Bernabéu Stadium in the first leg, but staged their biggest ever comeback at the Parc des Princes. Leading 3–0 lead going into injury time thanks to goals from Weah, Ginola and Valdo, Real Madrid pulled one back and forced extra time. Immediately afterward, Paris were awarded a dangerous free kick, and Valdo's 96th-minute cross was met by a header from Antoine Kombouaré, who put his team through to their first semi-final. This goal earned Kombouaré legendary status among fans and the nickname "Golden Helmet." PSG's quarter-final victory over Real Madrid is considered one of the greatest knockout ties in the competition's history. Their dream run ended against eventual champions Juventus. Weah put Paris ahead, but Roberto Baggio's hat-trick secured a 3–1 aggregate win for Juve.

History would repeat itself in the 1993–94 UEFA Cup Winners' Cup. PSG defeated Real Madrid in the quarter-finals, becoming the only French team to win at the Bernabéu with a Weah goal, but they fell just short of the final once again. After drawing 1–1 at home to Arsenal, the Parisians needed to score in London, but surprisingly, Artur Jorge left Weah in the stands, where he watched his team lose 1–0. In Jorge's place, the club welcomed Luis Fernandez, who guided PSG to one of their best ever campaigns.

Drawn into a lethal Group B alongside Bayern Munich, Spartak Moscow and Dynamo Kyiv, PSG became one of only seven teams to win all six of their group stage matches. Of note was their 1–0 away victory against Bayern, in which Weah dribbled past three defenders before slotting the ball into the top corner of Oliver Kahn's net. PSG then eliminated Johan Cruyff's "Dream Team" to reach their first Champions League semi-final. They pulled off a memorable comeback: Raí and Guérin overturned Barcelona's opener to advance 3–2 on aggregate. However, luck failed them against AC Milan. In the first leg, played at the Parc des Princes, the Rossoneri scored the winning goal in the dying minutes, after Ginola's shot hit the crossbar. AC Milan had no problems in the return leg and secured a 2–0 victory, burying PSG's European dream.

=== First European title: the Cup Winners' Cup ===
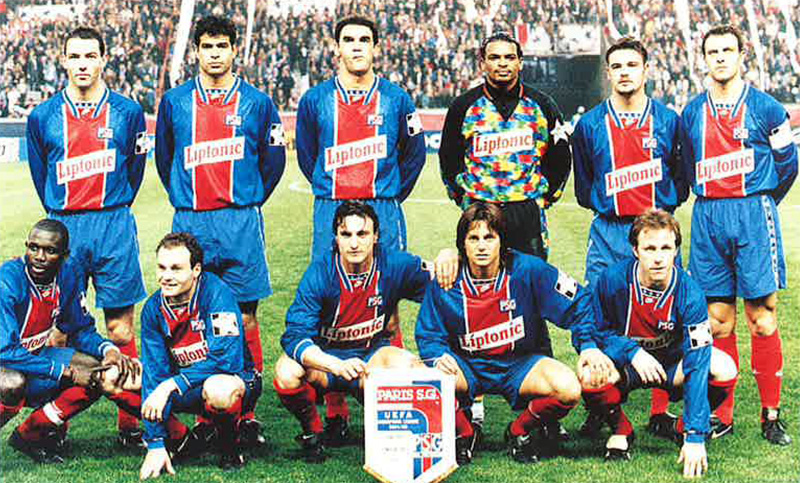
Starting eleven against AC Milan at San Siro in 1995.

PSG began the 1995–96 UEFA Cup Winners' Cup in the round of 32 against Molde. Despite a difficult match against the Norwegians, Paris won 3–2 in the first leg and comfortably won the second leg 3–0 thanks to a brace from Pascal Nouma. PSG then faced Celtic in the round of 16. Youri Djorkaeff, who had already scored in the first two matches, gave the Parisians a 1–0 victory in the first leg. In the second leg, the result was clear: 3–0 for Luis Fernández's team, who reached the quarter-finals of the competition.

Their quarter-final opponents were tournament favorites Parma. The Italians won 1–0 in the first leg, PSG's only defeat in the competition. But Paris were undeterred. Two penalties from Raí and another goal from Patrice Loko gave PSG a 3–1 victory over Parma in front of a packed Parc des Princes, reaching their fourth consecutive European semi-final. Deportivo de La Coruña, another contender for the top prize, were waiting on the doorsteps of the final. The first leg was hard-fought, and Djorkaeff, coming on as a substitute, opened the scoring in the 89th minute. PSG repeated the feat in Paris with a solitary goal from Loko. The semi-final curse had been broken, and PSG's first European final was a reality. Austrian club Rapid Wien were the opponent in the decisive match. They were the revelation of the season, eliminating teams such as Sporting CP, Dynamo Moscow and Feyenoord.

Things did not start off in the best possible way for PSG, with star player Raí coming off injured in the 12th minute, but that did not stop Fernandez's men from being the most enterprising at the King Baudouin Stadium in Brussels. With Djorkaeff pulling the strings, Paris created chance after chance until the only goal of the match arrived on the half-hour mark. He touched a free kick to his right and Bruno Ngotty fired a low, powerful shot from thirty yards out. The ball deflected slightly off a defender, deceiving the Rapid goalkeeper before crashing into the net. PSG failed to double their lead despite numerous chances, but were very solid defensively and held on to become the second French club to win a major European competition, after arch-rivals Marseille's triumph in the 1992–93 UEFA Champions League. Three years later, UEFA abolished the Cup Winners' Cup, leaving PSG as the only French side to win the tournament.

=== Super Cup and Cup Winners' Cup runners-up ===
With Ricardo replacing Fernandez as manager, Cup Winners' Cup champions PSG faced Champions League winners Juventus in the 1996 UEFA Super Cup. The Bianconeri proved too strong and sealed the first leg with a 6–1 victory at the Parc des Princes. Juve also prevailed in Italy to cap off a terrible 9–2 aggregate defeat to PSG. The Parisians recovered and reached the 1997 UEFA Cup Winners' Cup final four months later. They lost 4–2 to Galatasaray in Istanbul, but came from behind with a 4–0 win in the French capital to reach the quarter-finals. After a goalless draw at home to AEK Athens, a Patrice Loko hat-trick gave them a 3–0 victory in Greece. PSG then crushed Liverpool in Paris, taking a 3–0 lead in the first leg that seemed to have secured their place in the final. However, Liverpool came incredibly close to coming back in their 2–0 win at Anfield.

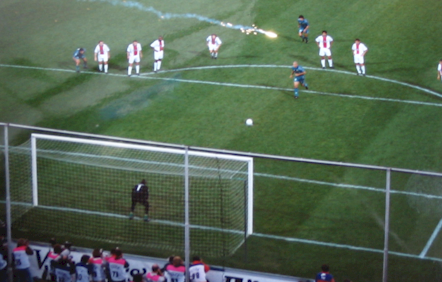
Ronaldo's penalty kick against PSG in 1997.

In the final, PSG faced Barcelona, managed by renowned English manager Bobby Robson and featuring a star-studded lineup led by Luís Figo and Ronaldo. The match, played at the De Kuip in Rotterdam, saw Paris suffer the Cup Winners' Cup curse, becoming the eighth team to reach a second consecutive final and lose. At the 38-minute mark, Ronaldo was fouled inside area by last season's hero, Bruno Ngotty, and coolly converted the penalty, beating Bernard Lama. Barça had opportunities to increase their lead: Figo hit the post twice, and PSG's Loko also struck the woodwork in the second half.

PSG opened their 1997–98 UEFA Champions League season against Steaua București in the second qualifying round, with the winner progressing to the group stage. After twice leading in the first leg, Paris lost 3–2 in Romania. Their chances were further damaged when UEFA handed PSG a 3–0 defeat for fielding suspended player Laurent Fournier. This administrative error meant that Paris had to win the second leg by a four-goal margin. Fortunately, an inspired Leonardo, playing his final game for the club, guided PSG to one of their finest European nights. He provided four assists during the 5–0 win over Steaua at the Parc des Princes.

The feat would be anecdotal, however, as Paris were cruelly eliminated in the group stage. Juventus scored a last-minute winner in their Group B match to overturn PSG's win over Beşiktaş in Group E and advance to the quarter-finals as the second-best group runners-up. Both teams finished on 12 points, but Juve had a superior goal difference. They suffered a similar fate in their next European outing. Having earned a place in the 1998–99 UEFA Cup Winners' Cup as domestic cup holders, PSG were humbled by Maccabi Haifa in the first round. Shocked in Paris, where a defensive lapse allowed Haifa to snatch a 1–1 draw, PSG were eliminated with a 90th-minute buzzer-beater in a 3–2 second-leg defeat.

=== Second European title: the Intertoto Cup ===
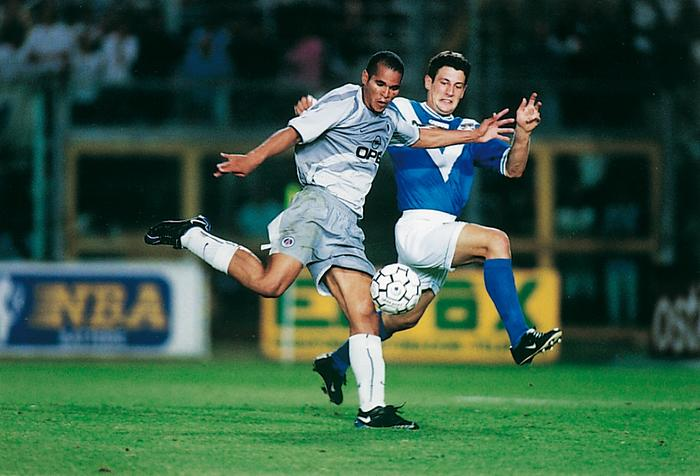
PSG striker Aloísio scoring the title-winning goal in the 2001 UEFA Intertoto Cup.

The 2000–01 UEFA Champions League saw PSG record two of the most famous and contrasting results in the competition's history. In the first group stage, Paris became the first team to score seven goals in a game as they thrashed Rosenborg 7–2 at the Parc des Princes. The nine-goal aggregate, which included a brace from Nicolas Anelka, was also a record at the time. Then, in the second group stage, PSG were eliminated by La Coruña, who became the second team to come from three goals down to win. Paris, leading 0–3 in Spain after 55 minutes through Jay-Jay Okocha and Laurent Leroy (twice), collapsed and lost 4–3.

PSG bounced back by claiming their second European title, the UEFA Intertoto Cup, in 2001. Luis Fernandez, in his second spell at PSG, had the difficult task of managing a side packed with individual talent, including Okocha and Anelka, but also Mauricio Pochettino, Gabriel Heinze and Mikel Arteta. Ronaldinho joined the squad after the tournament. Paris hammered Jazz, Gent and Tavriya Simferopol on their way to the two-legged final against Baggio's Brescia. In the first leg, neither team managed to score at the Parc des Princes. The return leg in Italy was also a close affair. Okocha hit the post with a free-kick late in the second half before Aloísio scored the winning goal. Baggio leveled the score with a penalty ten minutes from time, but PSG held on to win on away goals.

The Parisians continued their fine run in the 2001–02 UEFA Europa League, comfortably beating Rapid București and Rapid Wien in a brilliant start to the campaign. However, the team fell apart afterward, and PSG lost on penalties to Rangers in the third round after two goalless matches. In the summer, Arteta and Okocha left after receiving better offers, while Anelka was loaned out due to a dispute with Fernandez. The latter also frequently left Ronaldinho on the bench, accusing the Brazilian of being more focused on the city's nightlife than on football.

PSG suffered another early exit from the 2002–03 UEFA Europa League. After beating Újpest and Național București in the first two rounds, they were eliminated by Boavista on away goals in the third round. Playing with ten men, PSG managed to beat them 2–1 in France, but a mistake by goalkeeper Lionel Letizi in the second leg doomed his team. Fernandez was sacked at the end of the season, while the departures of Pochettino and Ronaldinho confirmed the end of a promising team that never lived up to its potential.

=== UEFA Europa League regular ===
PSG briefly returned to the Champions League in 2004–05. However, their performance was a complete disappointment, save for their victory against reigning champions Porto. PSG enjoyed a magical night at the Parc des Princes, where they earned their only victory, finishing bottom of their group. Charles-Édouard Coridon curled a cross from inside the box with a scorpion-like shot, surprising the goalkeeper. Club legend Pauleta extended the lead just a minute later, making it 2–0. The capital club improved in their next continental match, this time advancing past the group stage and reaching the round of 16 of the 2006–07 UEFA Europa League. PSG won the first leg against Benfica 2–1. In the second leg, the Portuguese side led 2–0, but Pauleta's goal for Paris threatened to send the tie to extra time. A last-minute penalty from Simão eliminated them.

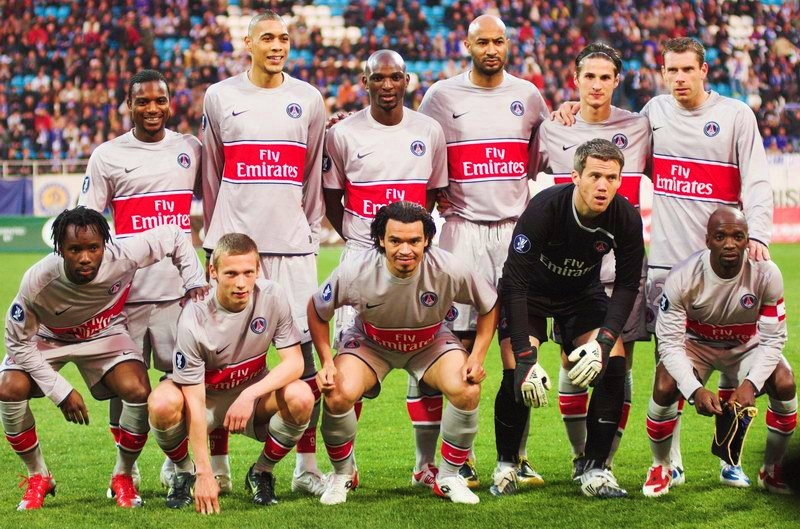
PSG away to Dynamo Kyiv in 2009.

PSG returned stronger in the 2008–09 UEFA Europa League. As the last-placed team in Group A, they needed to defeat Twente at the Parc des Princes on the final day, scoring one more goal than Racing de Santander, to secure third place and advance to the round of 32. Péguy Luyindula put Paris ahead eight minutes into the match, and Stéphane Sessègnon extended their lead midway through the first half. After the break, Luyindula won a penalty, but the goalie saved Mateja Kežman's shot, as Racing led by three goals. PSG's fortunes turned in the final ten minutes: Kežman made up for the miss by scoring from a cross, and Luyindula quickly added a fourth, feinting the keeper before sending the ball into an empty net. Racing could not score any more, and Paris outscored them.

The Parisians easily dispatched eventual Bundesliga champions Wolfsburg with a 5–1 aggregate win, boosted by braces from Guillaume Hoarau and Luyindula. Hoarau was again instrumental against Braga in the round of 16, heading in the only goal of both legs to allow PSG to reach the quarter-finals of a major European tournament for the first time since 1997. Despite having more chances against Dynamo Kyiv, Paris failed to break down their defense and the first leg ended in a goalless draw. In Ukraine, two costly errors by PSG goalkeeper Mickaël Landreau gave Dynamo a 3–0 victory, eliminating Paris from the competition.

PSG's start to the 2010–11 UEFA Europa League looked promising. After eliminating Maccabi Tel Aviv in a frantic nine-goal playoff tie, the Coupe de France holders were drawn into the group of death, alongside Sevilla, Borussia Dortmund and Karpaty Lviv. Fueled by a brilliant Nenê, PSG finished the year as Group J winners without losing a single match, deservedly beating closest challengers Sevilla in both matches. However, Paris ran out of gas after the winter break and only just managed to beat BATE Borisov on away goals thanks to Luyindula's last-minute equalizer in the first leg. In a repeat of their 2007 clash, PSG's hopes were dashed by Benfica. After coming from behind to win 2–1 in Lisbon, the Portuguese side took the lead at the Parc des Princes, and despite Mathieu Bodmer's volley that quickly leveled the score, Paris failed to turn things around.

=== Qatari buyout and Champions League return ===
PSG's transformation into a UEFA Champions League contender began in 2011 with their purchase by Qatar Sports Investments, which made them one of the richest clubs globally. Despite an initial setback in 2011–12, in which they were eliminated from the UEFA Europa League in the group stage, the club found its footing the following season. In 2012–13, spearheaded by Carlo Ancelotti and Zlatan Ibrahimović, PSG made their first Champions League appearance since 2004. PSG overcame Valencia in the round of 16, becoming the first French team to win at the Mestalla Stadium in any UEFA competition, but were unlucky to be eliminated on away goals by Barcelona in the quarter-finals after drawing both legs.

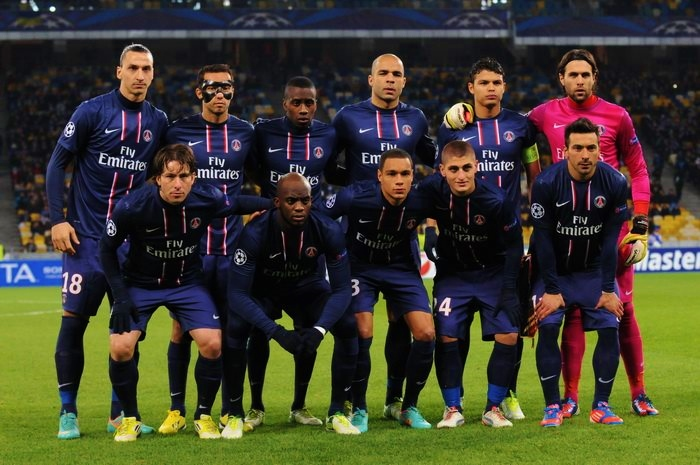
PSG returned to the Champions League in 2012.

Under new manager Laurent Blanc, PSG suffered the same outcome in 2013–14, this time against Chelsea. They won 3–1 at home and looked to have one foot in the semi-finals, but were eliminated on away goals after losing 2–0 in London. Blanc's men gained revenge on Chelsea in 2014–15. In extra time, PSG heroically defeated Chelsea at Stamford Bridge, with a man down after Zlatan's sending-off in the half-hour mark, thanks to headers from David Luiz and Thiago Silva. Their joy was short-lived, as eventual champions Barcelona outclassed Paris in the quarter-finals. Another elimination at the same stage in 2015–16 was the final straw for Blanc. Facing Chelsea again, PSG easily dispatched them with a 4–2 aggregate victory, but were unable to overcome Manchester City in the quarter-finals.

Fresh from three consecutive Europa League titles, Unai Emery was hired by the club in 2016–17. After a shaky group stage, PSG defeated Barcelona 4–0 in the first leg of their round of 16 Champions League tie in Paris. It was hailed as one of the best European performances in recent memory. However, PSG crumbled 6–1 at the Camp Nou, with Barça scoring three goals in the final seven minutes in the biggest comeback in the history of the competition, known as La Remontada. Referee Deniz Aytekin was heavily criticized for favoring Barcelona, while PSG signed Neymar, the main architect of La Remontada, for a world-record fee of €222m.

The club also signed teenage sensation Mbappé for €180m, a fee bettered only by Neymar, to form a fearsome attacking trio with Cavani in 2017–18, but after taking an early lead over Real Madrid in the Champions League last 16, they conceded four consecutive goals and went down tamely, effectively sealing the end of Emery's reign. PSG turned to German manager Thomas Tuchel in 2018–19. On the verge of reaching the quarter-finals for the first time since 2016, PSG were eliminated on away goals against a failing and battered Manchester United side. Goals from Presnel Kimpembe and Mbappé made PSG the first French team to win at Old Trafford in any European competition, but a Romelu Lukaku brace and a late Marcus Rashford penalty sealed another second-leg collapse in Paris. Kimpembe, one of the heroes in Manchester, became the villain when the ball hit his arm inside the box in the final seconds of the match. The referee consulted VAR and awarded a penalty. Rashford converted it and United won 3–1.

=== First Champions League final ===
2020 UEFA Champions League final starting lineups.

PSG finally broke their Champions League slump in 2019–20. The Parisians topped Group A, highlighted by their 3–0 thrashing of Real Madrid thanks to a brace from Ángel Di María in their opening game. PSG were drawn against Borussia Dortmund, and their old demons resurfaced. A poor display saw Paris lose 2–1 in Germany, leaving them on the brink of a fourth consecutive round of 16 exit. But Tuchel's side stepped up in the return leg, with Neymar scoring the opener to fire them into the quarter-finals with a 2–0 win over Dortmund at an empty Parc des Princes due to the COVID-19 pandemic. The Champions League was suspended until August 2020, when it resumed in a single-knockout format in Lisbon.

In the quarter-finals, Atalanta scored first and came within minutes of victory. Neymar and Mbappé staged a late comeback to send Paris into the semi-finals for the first time since 1995. The Brazilian assisted Marquinhos for a 90th-minute equalizer, while Mbappé set up unlikely hero Eric Maxim Choupo-Moting for a last-gasp winner. Against RB Leipzig, PSG wrapped up the match before the hour mark with goals from Marquinhos, Di María and Juan Bernat to reach their first Champions League final, as well as their first European final since 2001. They faced Bayern Munich in a hard-fought encounter. PSG had their chances in the first half, including a Neymar shot that Bayern goalkeeper Manuel Neuer saved. The Bavarians were superior in the second half, with former PSG Academy graduate Kingsley Coman heading in the only goal of the match.

PSG had a shaky start to the 2020–21 campaign. They fell to Manchester United in their opening match, won against Başakşehir, and were defeated by Leipzig. Facing elimination, Neymar's six goals over their next three matches secured a narrow group victory. This included a memorable comeback win against Manchester United in 2019, triumphing 3–1 at Old Trafford. PSG finally got their revenge for La Remontada, becoming the first French team to win at Camp Nou in the Champions League. Only Metz had achieved this feat before them, back in the 1984–85 UEFA Cup Winners' Cup. In a dominant display in Spain, Paris crushed Barcelona 4–1, thanks to a hat-trick from Mbappé. Keylor Navas then ensured there would be no comeback in the second leg, securing a 1–1 draw and a place in the quarter-finals.

In a rematch of the 2020 final, PSG took on reigning champions Bayern Munich and pulled off a 3–2 victory at the Allianz Arena. Despite Bayern's dominance in the first leg, PSG's effectiveness shone through, with two goals from Mbappé, two assists from Neymar, and crucial saves from Navas. This victory made PSG the first French team to beat Bayern in a Champions League knockout round since Saint-Étienne in 1969. In the second leg, man of the match Neymar failed to convert his numerous chances, but hosts PSG advanced to the semi-finals on away goals despite losing 1–0. Against Manchester City at home, PSG took the lead through Marquinhos after a great first-half display, but collapsed in the second as City capitalised on two serious errors from Paris to turn the match on its head. The Citizens then secured their place in the final with a 2–0 victory in England.

=== Third European title: the Champions League ===
In the 2021–22 campaign, PSG finished second in Group A, just one point behind Manchester City. Mauricio Pochettino's men won at the Parc des Princes, with Lionel Messi scoring his first goal for Paris, but wasted Mbappé's opener and lost in Manchester. PSG faced Real Madrid in the round of 16. Having scored in Paris, following a backheel assist from Neymar, Mbappé added another in Madrid, putting his team two goals up with less than half an hour left. PSG then collapsed, conceding three goals in 17 minutes.

The 2022–23 season unfolded in a similar fashion. Level on points, Benfica overtook PSG for first place by scoring more away goals during the group stage. On a positive note, Paris began the campaign by beating Juventus 2–1 at home. Mbappé's brace sealed their first win against the Italians in nine matches. Another highlight was their 7–2 home win over Maccabi Haifa, which equaled their record for goals scored in a European match. In the round of 16, PSG demonstrated their limitations, losing 3–0 on aggregate to Bayern Munich.

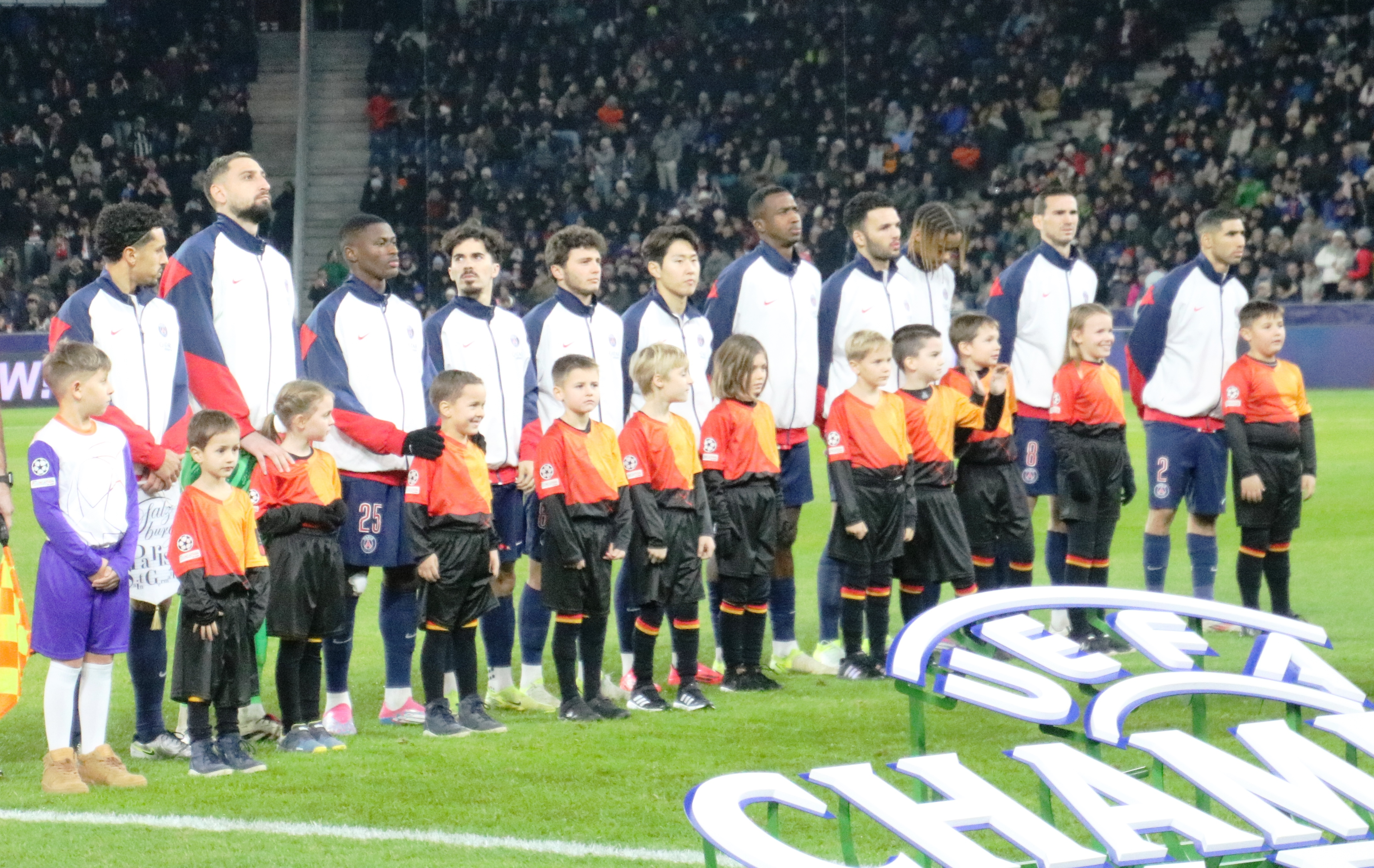
PSG during their UCL title-winning campaign.

Paris were drawn into the Group of Death in 2023–24, alongside Borussia Dortmund, AC Milan, and Newcastle United. PSG finished second behind Dortmund and played Real Sociedad. Mbappé's three goals gave them a 4–1 aggregate victory. PSG manager Luis Enrique, who masterminded La Remontada, gave Barcelona an extra dose of their own medicine in the quarter-finals. Down 2–4 on aggregate, Paris stormed back with four goals, two by Mbappé, to win 6–4. In the semi-finals, PSG dominated their tie against Dortmund, but lacked a killer instinct in front of goal, hitting the woodwork six times and losing 2–0 on aggregate.

In 2024–25, early results were unpromising, with defeats to Arsenal, Atlético Madrid and Bayern Munich in the league phase. PSG still managed to qualify for the knockout phase, scoring four goals and overturning a 53rd-minute 2–0 deficit against Manchester City. They thrashed Brest 10–0 on aggregate, setting up a draw with tournament favorites Liverpool. PSG lost 1–0 at home despite having edged them, but leveled the aggregate score at 1–1 at Anfield thanks to Ousmane Dembélé. Gianluigi Donnarumma made incredible saves throughout the match and then stopped two penalties to send Paris into the quarter-finals. Further outstanding performances from Dembélé, who scored again, and Donnarumma against Aston Villa and Arsenal saw PSG reach their second final.

The Parisians defeated Inter Milan by a record 5–0 scoreline at the Allianz Arena in Munich, becoming the first team to win a European Cup final by more than four goals. Named Man of the Match, Désiré Doué assisted Achraf Hakimi for the opener and then extended the lead after being played in by Dembélé. Luis Enrique's team wrapped things up on the hour mark when a backheel pass from Dembélé found Vitinha, who in turn sent Doué into the box for his second goal of the night. Ten minutes later, Khvicha Kvaratskhelia added the fourth, following another Dembélé assist, while Bradley Barcola set up Senny Mayulu to seal PSG's continental treble after victories in Ligue 1 and the Coupe de France.

=== Super Cup double, World title, and second UCL ===
The club qualified for the 2025 FIFA Club World Cup via their UEFA ranking from the 2021–24 cycle. PSG suffered a 1–0 defeat against 2024 Copa Libertadores winners Botafogo, but recorded wins over Seattle Sounders and Bayern Munich. They also achieved three 4–0 wins against Atlético Madrid, Inter Miami and Real Madrid. In the final, however, PSG were defeated 3–0 by Chelsea, who scored all three goals in the first half, including two from Cole Palmer. PSG responded by winning the 2025 UEFA Super Cup at the Stadio Friuli in Udine, becoming the first French club to win the competition. Trailing 2–0, they equalised in the final ten minutes through substitutes Lee Kang-in and Gonçalo Ramos, before defeating Europa League winners Tottenham Hotspur 4–3 on penalties. Ousmane Dembélé provided the assist for the equaliser and was named man of the match.

As Champions League winners, PSG qualified directly for the final of the 2025 FIFA Intercontinental Cup against 2025 Copa Libertadores champions Flamengo at the Ahmad bin Ali Stadium in Qatar. Khvicha Kvaratskhelia opened the scoring before Flamengo equalised through a Jorginho penalty. After a goalless extra time, PSG won the match on penalties, with goalkeeper Matvey Safonov saving four spot-kicks. The victory made PSG the first French club to win the competition, secured the first club world title in French football history, and completed an unprecedented sextuple, previously achieved only by Barcelona in 2009 and Bayern Munich in 2020.

Luis Enrique's side retained the UCL title in 2026 despite an inconsistent league phase and a difficult play-off tie against Monaco. From the round of 16 onwards, PSG produced a series of strong performances, with Kvaratskhelia and Dembélé playing key roles. The club defeated Chelsea and Liverpool by a combined aggregate score of 12–2 before overcoming Bayern Munich in the semi-finals, a tie decided by a 5–4 victory at the Parc des Princes. PSG faced Arsenal in the final at the Puskás Aréna in Budapest. Arsenal took an early lead, but Dembélé equalised from a penalty won by Kvaratskhelia. In the resulting penalty shoot-out, Arsenal missed their final attempt, allowing PSG to become the first club since Real Madrid in 2018 to successfully defend their title and the ninth overall to do so. PSG also equalled Barcelona's 1999–2000 record of 45 goals scored in a single UCL campaign.

PSG became only the third team to win consecutive titles after defeating Aston Villa 2–1 in the 2026 UEFA Super Cup. Goals from Khvicha Kvaratskhelia and Désiré Doué secured the victory for the European champions.

== Records ==
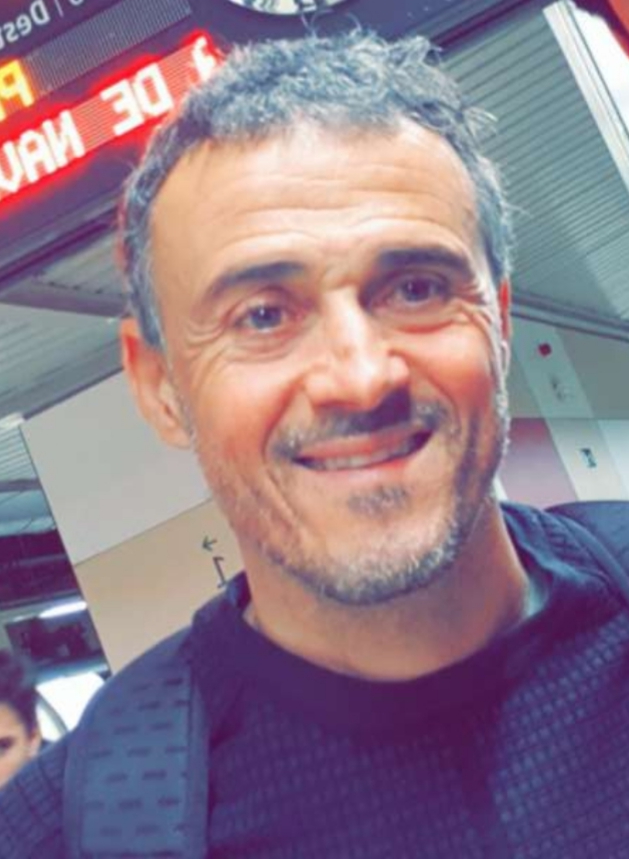
Luis Enrique

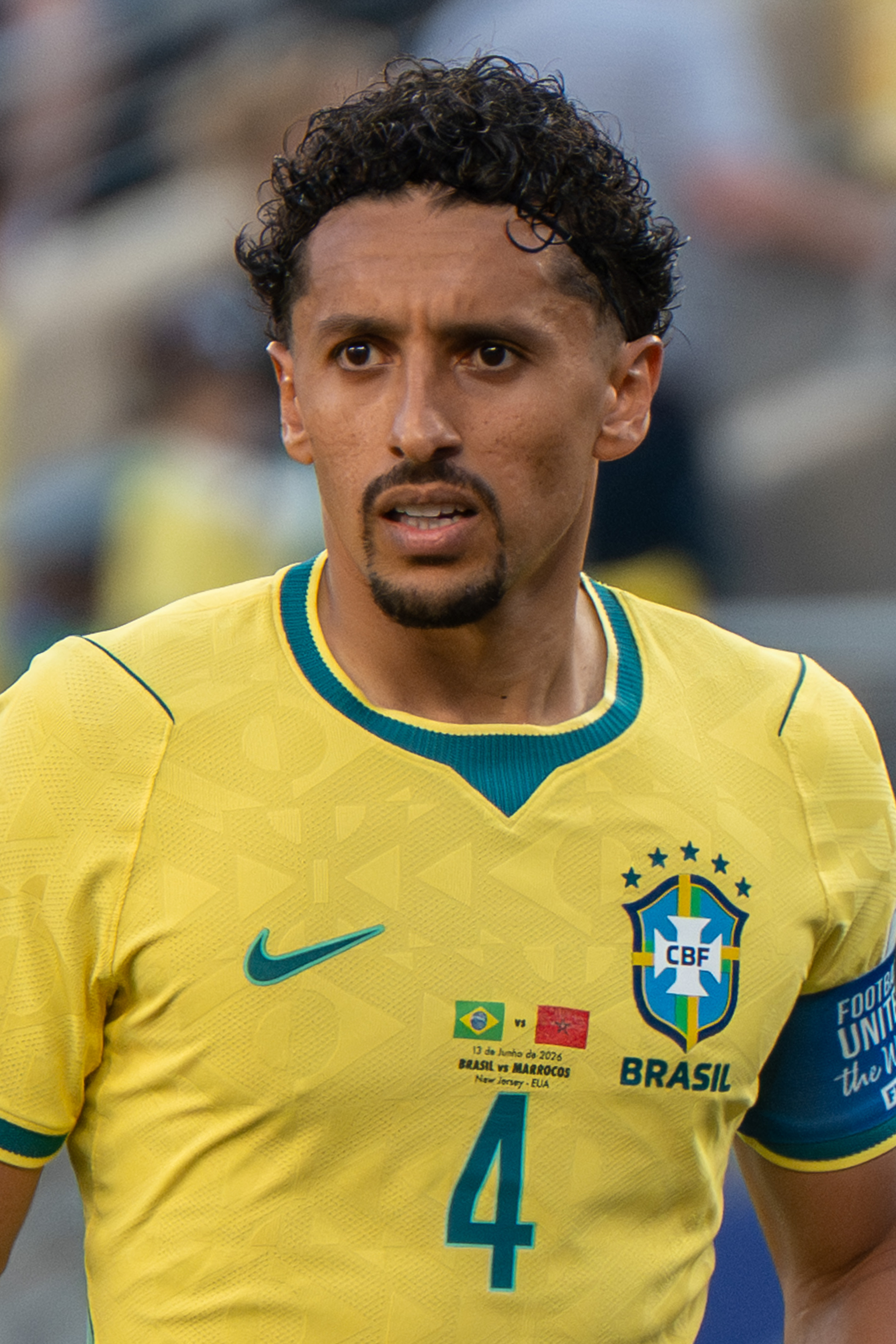
Marquinhos

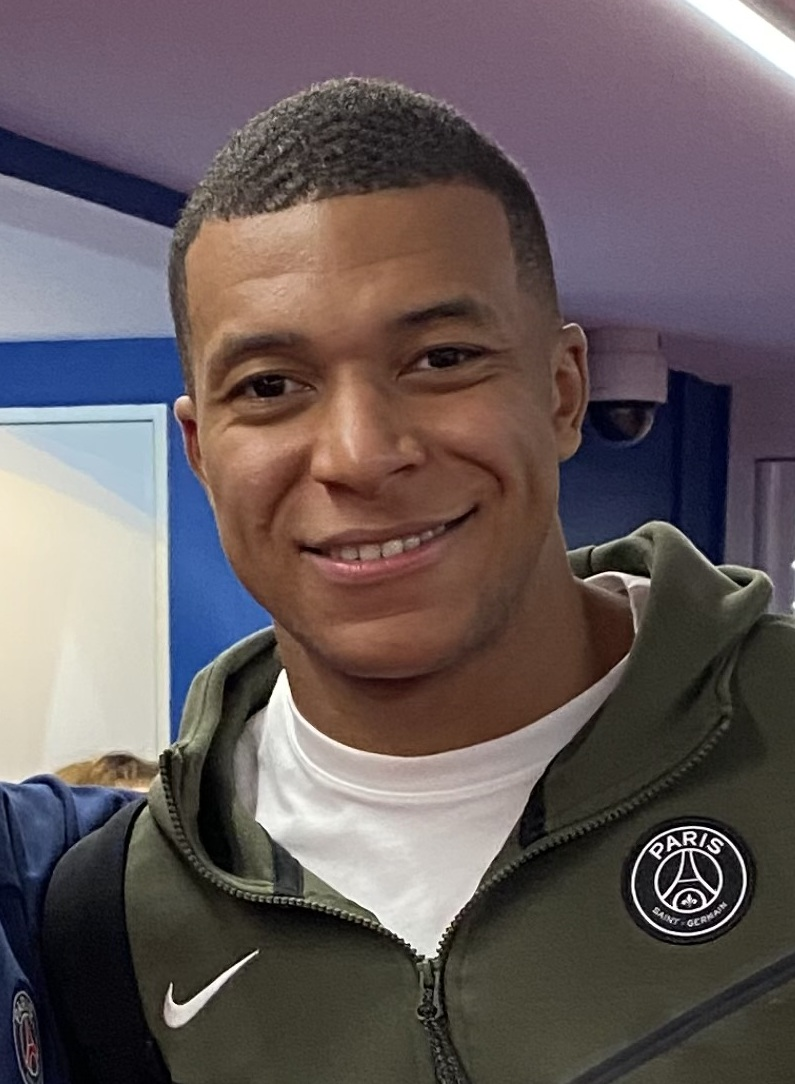
Kylian Mbappé

As of 3 November 2026.

=== Club ===
- Record win: 7–0 home to Brest, UEFA Champions League, 19 February 2025.
- Record defeat: 1–6.
  - Home to Juventus, UEFA Super Cup, 15 January 1997.
  - Away to Barcelona, UEFA Champions League, 8 March 2017.
- Longest winning run: 8 matches.
- Longest unbeaten run: 19 matches.
- Most goals scored in a season: 45 in the 2025–26 UEFA Champions League.
- Fewest goals conceded in a season: 2 in the 2002–03 UEFA Cup.
- Highest home attendance: 49,575 vs. Waterschei, UEFA Cup Winners' Cup, 13 March 1983.
- Lowest home attendance: 9,117 vs. Karpaty Lviv, UEFA Europa League, 30 September 2010.

=== Personnel ===
- Most decorated president in international competitions: 5 titles – Nasser Al-Khelaifi.
- Most decorated president in UEFA competitions: 4 titles – Nasser Al-Khelaifi.
- Most decorated manager in international competitions: 5 titles – Luis Enrique.
- Most decorated manager in UEFA competitions: 4 titles – Luis Enrique.
- Most matches managed in international competitions: 60 matches – Luis Enrique.
- Most matches managed in UEFA competitions: 52 matches – Luis Enrique.
- Most matches won in international competitions: 36 wins – Luis Enrique.
- Most matches won in UEFA competitions: 31 wins – Luis Enrique.

=== Appearances ===
- Most appearances in international competitions: 133 – Marquinhos.
- Most appearances in UEFA competitions: 126 – Marquinhos.
- Most appearances in UEFA Champions League: 124 – Marquinhos.
- Most appearances in UEFA Europa League: 31 – Clément Chantôme.
- Most appearances in UEFA Super Cup: 2 – twenty-one players.
- Most appearances in UEFA Cup Winners' Cup: 25 – Laurent Fournier and Paul Le Guen.
- Most appearances in UEFA Intertoto Cup: 8 – Aloísio, Édouard Cissé, Frédéric Déhu and Lionel Letizi.
- Most appearances in FIFA Club World Cup: 7 – nine players.
- Most appearances in FIFA Intercontinental Cup: 1 – sixteen players.

=== Goalscorers ===
- Most goals in international competitions: 42 – Kylian Mbappé.
- Most goals in UEFA competitions: 42 – Kylian Mbappé.
- Most goals in UEFA Champions League: 42 – Kylian Mbappé.
- Most goals in UEFA Europa League: 10 – Peguy Luyindula.
- Most goals in UEFA Super Cup: 2 – Raí.
- Most goals in UEFA Cup Winners' Cup: 8 – Patrice Loko.
- Most goals in UEFA Intertoto Cup: 5 – Jay-Jay Okocha.
- Most goals in FIFA Club World Cup: 3 – Fabián Ruiz.
- Most goals in FIFA Intercontinental Cup: 1 – Khvicha Kvaratskhelia.
- Most goals in a season: 10.
  - Zlatan Ibrahimović in the 2013–14 UEFA Champions League.
  - Khvicha Kvaratskhelia in the 2025–26 UEFA Champions League.

== Statistics ==
As of 3 November 2026.

=== Honours ===
Type	Competition	Titles	Seasons
Continental	UEFA Champions League	2	2024–25, 2025–26
Continental	UEFA Cup Winners' Cup	1	1995–96
Continental	UEFA Intertoto Cup	1	2001
Continental	UEFA Super Cup	2	2025, 2026
Worldwide	FIFA Intercontinental Cup	1^{s}	2025

- record
- ^{s} shared record

=== Finals ===
8 May 1996 Cup Winners' Cup	Paris Saint-Germain (France)	1–0	(Austria) Rapid Wien	Brussels, Belgium
20:15 CEST (UTC+02:00)	Ngotty 28'	Report		Stadium: King Baudouin Stadium; Attendance: 38,402; Referee: Pierluigi Pairetto (Italy)

15 January 1997 Super Cup (1st leg)	Paris Saint-Germain (France)	1–6	(Italy) Juventus	Paris, France
20:30 CEST (UTC+02:00)	Raí 52' (pen.)	Report	Porrini 4'; Padovano 22', 40'; Ferrara 33'; Lombardo 83'; Amoruso 88'	Stadium: Parc des Princes; Attendance: 29,519; Referee: Nikolai Levnikov (Russia)

5 February 1997 Super Cup (2nd leg)	Juventus (Italy)	3–1	(France) Paris Saint-Germain	Palermo, Italy
20:45 CEST (UTC+02:00)	Del Piero 36', 70'; Vieri 90'	Report	Raí 63' (pen.)	Stadium: Stadio Renzo Barbera; Attendance: 35,152; Referee: Serge Muhmenthaler (Switzerland)
Note: Juventus won 9–2 on aggregate.

14 May 1997 Cup Winners' Cup	Barcelona (Spain)	1–0	(France) Paris Saint-Germain	Rotterdam, Netherlands
20:30 CEST (UTC+02:00)	Ronaldo 38' (pen.)	Report		Stadium: De Kuip; Attendance: 36,802; Referee: Pierluigi Pairetto (Italy)

7 August 2001 Intertoto Cup (1st leg)	Paris Saint-Germain (France)	0–0	(Italy) Brescia	Paris, France
20:30 CEST (UTC+02:00)		Report		Stadium: Parc des Princes; Attendance: 35,000; Referee: Mike McCurry (Scotland)

21 August 2001 Intertoto Cup (2nd leg)	Brescia (Italy)	1–1	(France) Paris Saint-Germain	Brescia, Italy
20:15 CEST (UTC+02:00)	Baggio 79' (pen.)	Report	Aloísio 74'	Stadium: Stadio Mario Rigamonti; Attendance: 23,000; Referee: Juan Antonio Fernández (Spain)
Note: 1–1 on aggregate. Paris Saint-Germain won on away goals.

23 August 2020 Champions League	Paris Saint-Germain (France)	0–1	(Germany) Bayern Munich	Lisbon, Portugal
20:00 UTC+1		Report	Coman 59'	Stadium: Estádio da Luz; Attendance: 0 Referee: Daniele Orsato (Italy)

31 May 2025 Champions League	Paris Saint-Germain (France)	5–0	(Italy) Inter Milan	Munich, Germany
21:00 CEST (UTC+02:00)	Hakimi 12'; Doué 20', 63'; Kvaratskhelia 73'; Mayulu 86'	Report		Stadium: Allianz Arena; Attendance: 64,327; Referee: István Kovács (Romania)

13 July 2025 Club World Cup	Chelsea (England)	3–0	(France) Paris Saint-Germain	East Rutherford, United States
15:00 EDT (UTC−04:00)	Palmer 22', 30'; João Pedro 43'	Report		Stadium: MetLife Stadium; Attendance: 81,118; Referee: Alireza Faghani (Australia)

13 August 2025 Super Cup	Paris Saint-Germain (France)	2–2 (4–3 p)	(England) Tottenham Hotspur	Udine, Italy
21:00 CEST (UTC+02:00)	Lee Kang-in 85'; Ramos 90+4'	Report	Van de Ven 39'; Romero 48'	Stadium: Stadio Friuli; Attendance: 21,025; Referee: João Pinheiro (Portugal)
	Penalties
	Vitinha (penalty missed); Ramos (penalty scored); Dembélé (penalty scored); Lee Kang-in (penalty scored); Mendes (penalty scored)		(penalty scored) Solanke; (penalty scored) Bentancur; (penalty missed) Van de Ven; (penalty missed) Tel; (penalty scored) Porro

17 December 2025 Intercontinental Cup	Paris Saint-Germain (France)	1–1 (a.e.t.) (2–1 p)	(Brazil) Flamengo	Al Rayyan, Qatar
20:00 AST (UTC+03:00)	Kvaratskhelia 38'	Report	Jorginho 62' (pen.)	Stadium: Ahmad bin Ali Stadium; Attendance: 42,150; Referee: Ismail Elfath (United States)
	Penalties
	Vitinha (penalty scored); Dembélé (penalty missed); Mendes (penalty scored); Barcola (penalty missed)		(penalty scored) De la Cruz; (penalty missed) Saúl; (penalty missed) Pedro; (penalty missed) Léo Pereira; (penalty missed) Luiz Araújo

30 May 2026 Champions League	Paris Saint-Germain (France)	1–1 (a.e.t.) (4–3 p)	(England) Arsenal	Budapest, Hungary
18:00 CEST (UTC+02:00)	Dembélé 65' (pen.)	Report	Havertz 6'	Stadium: Puskás Aréna; Attendance: 61,035; Referee: Daniel Siebert (Germany)
	Penalties
	Ramos (penalty scored); Doué (penalty scored); Mendes (penalty missed); Hakimi (penalty scored); Beraldo (penalty scored)		(penalty scored) Gyökeres; (penalty missed) Eze; (penalty scored) Rice; (penalty scored) Martinelli; (penalty missed) Gabriel

12 August 2026 Super Cup	Paris Saint-Germain (France)	2–1	(England) Aston Villa	Salzburg, Austria
21:00 CEST (UTC+02:00)	Kvaratskhelia 20'; Doué 61'	Report	Madjo 45'	Stadium: Red Bull Arena; Attendance: 27,681; Referee: Omar Artan (Somalia)

=== By season ===
Edition	Competition	Pld	W	D	L	GF	GA	GD	Win %	Round
1982–83	UEFA Cup Winners' Cup	6	4	0	2	10	5	+5	66.67	Quarter-finals
1983–84	UEFA Cup Winners' Cup	4	2	2	0	6	4	+2	50.00	Second round
1984–85	UEFA Europa League	4	1	1	2	8	7	+1	25.00	Second round
1986–87	UEFA Champions League	2	0	1	1	2	3	−1	0.00	First round
1989–90	UEFA Europa League	4	1	1	2	4	5	−1	25.00	Second round
1992–93	UEFA Europa League	10	4	3	3	14	8	+6	40.00	Semi-finals
1993–94	UEFA Cup Winners' Cup	8	5	2	1	12	3	+9	62.50	Semi-finals
1994–95	UEFA Champions League	12	9	1	2	20	9	+11	75.00	Semi-finals
1995–96	UEFA Cup Winners' Cup	9	8	0	1	16	4	+12	88.89	Winners
1996	UEFA Super Cup	2	0	0	2	2	9	−7	0.00	Runners-up
1996–97	UEFA Cup Winners' Cup	9	5	1	3	19	7	+12	55.56	Runners-up
1997–98	UEFA Champions League	8	5	0	3	16	13	+3	62.50	Group stage
1998–99	UEFA Cup Winners' Cup	2	0	1	1	3	4	−1	0.00	First round
2000–01	UEFA Champions League	12	4	3	5	22	19	+3	33.33	Second group stage
2001	UEFA Intertoto Cup	8	5	3	0	20	3	+17	62.50	Winners
2001–02	UEFA Europa League	6	2	4	0	9	2	+7	33.33	Third round
2002–03	UEFA Europa League	6	5	0	1	9	2	+7	83.33	Third round
2004–05	UEFA Champions League	6	1	2	3	3	8	−5	16.67	Group stage
2006–07	UEFA Europa League	10	5	3	2	15	8	+7	50.00	Round of 16
2008–09	UEFA Europa League	12	5	5	2	15	10	+5	41.67	Quarter-finals
2010–11	UEFA Europa League	12	4	6	2	18	13	+5	33.33	Round of 16
2011–12	UEFA Europa League	8	5	1	2	14	7	+7	62.50	Group stage
2012–13	UEFA Champions League	10	6	3	1	20	8	+12	60.00	Quarter-finals
2013–14	UEFA Champions League	10	7	1	2	25	9	+16	70.00	Quarter-finals
2014–15	UEFA Champions League	10	4	3	3	14	15	−1	40.00	Quarter-finals
2015–16	UEFA Champions League	10	6	2	2	18	6	+12	60.00	Quarter-finals
2016–17	UEFA Champions League	8	4	3	1	18	13	+5	50.00	Round of 16
2017–18	UEFA Champions League	8	5	0	3	27	9	+18	62.50	Round of 16
2018–19	UEFA Champions League	8	4	2	2	20	12	+8	50.00	Round of 16
2019–20	UEFA Champions League	11	8	1	2	25	6	+19	72.73	Runners-up
2020–21	UEFA Champions League	12	6	1	5	22	15	+7	50.00	Semi-finals
2021–22	UEFA Champions League	8	4	2	2	15	11	+4	50.00	Round of 16
2022–23	UEFA Champions League	8	4	2	2	16	10	+6	50.00	Round of 16
2023–24	UEFA Champions League	12	5	2	5	19	15	+4	41.67	Semi-finals
2024–25	UEFA Champions League	17	11	1	5	38	15	+23	64.71	Winners
2025	FIFA Club World Cup	7	5	0	2	16	4	+12	71.43	Runners-up
2025	UEFA Super Cup	1	0	1	0	2	2	+0	0.00	Winners
2025	FIFA Intercontinental Cup	1	0	1	0	1	1	+0	0.00	Winners
2025–26	UEFA Champions League	17	10	5	2	45	23	+22	58.82	Winners
2026	UEFA Super Cup	1	1	0	0	2	1	+1	100.00	Winners
2026	FIFA Intercontinental Cup	0	0	0	0	0	0	+0	—	Final
2026–27	UEFA Champions League	4	4	0	0	20	5	+15	100.00	League phase
2029	FIFA Club World Cup	0	0	0	0	0	0	+0	—	Group stage

=== By competition ===
Competition	Pld	W	D	L	GF	GA	GD	Win %
UEFA Champions League	193	107	35	51	403	224	+179	55.44
UEFA Europa League	72	32	24	16	106	62	+44	44.44
UEFA Cup Winners' Cup (defunct)	38	24	6	8	66	27	+39	63.16
UEFA Intertoto Cup (defunct)	8	5	3	0	20	3	+17	62.50
UEFA Super Cup	4	1	1	2	6	12	−6	25.00
FIFA Club World Cup	7	5	0	2	16	4	+12	71.43
FIFA Intercontinental Cup	1	0	1	0	1	1	+0	0.00
Total	323	174	70	79	618	333	+285	53.87
