= FC Barcelona 6–1 Paris Saint-Germain FC =

2017 football match in the UEFA Champions League

La Remontada
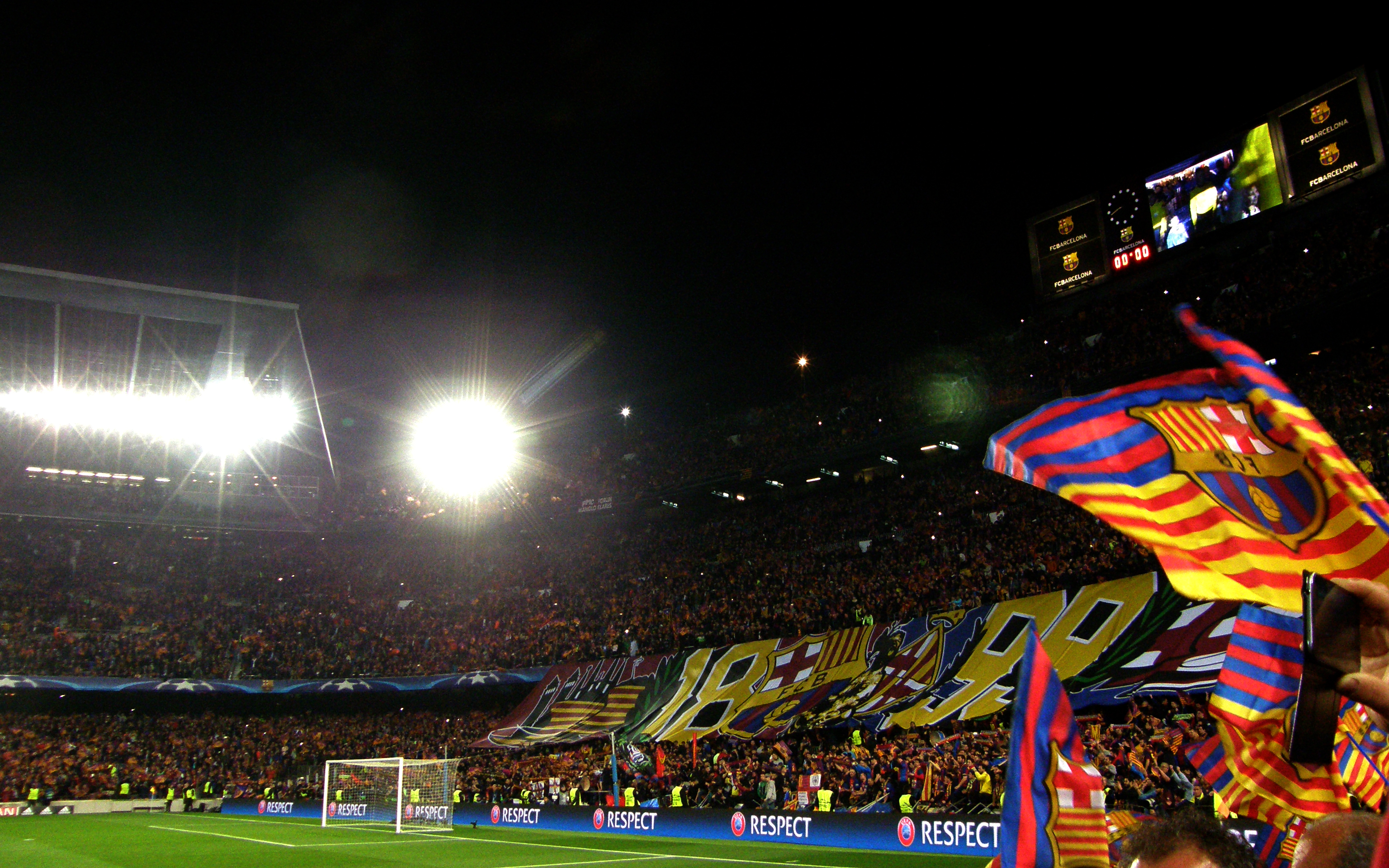
- The Camp Nou in Barcelona prior to the game
- Event: 2016–17 Champions League; Round of 16, second leg
Barcelona	Paris Saint-Germain
(Spain)	(France)
6	1
- Barcelona won 6–5 on aggregate
- Date: 8 March 2017
- Venue: Camp Nou, Barcelona
- Man of the Match: Neymar (Barcelona)
- Referee: Deniz Aytekin (Germany)
- Attendance: 96,290
- Weather: Partly cloudy 13 °C (55 °F); 80% humidity

The association football match between Barcelona and Paris Saint-Germain occurred on 8 March 2017 at the Camp Nou. It was the second leg of the 2016–17 UEFA Champions League round of 16; PSG won the first leg at the Parc des Princes 4–0 a month earlier. During the match, Barcelona scored six times, including two goals in injury time, to win the match 6–1 and 6–5 on aggregate. It was the largest comeback in UEFA Champions League history, which became known in Spain and France as La Remontada (lit. 'the comeback'; Catalan: La Remuntada). Barcelona manager Luis Enrique said before the match 'if they can score 4 we can score 6'

== Background ==
This was the third match between Paris Saint-Germain and Barcelona in the UEFA Champions League knockout phases. PSG lost both previous encounters: in the quarter-finals of the 2012–13 edition on away goals and the 2014–15 season 5–1 on aggregate. Both teams had comfortably qualified from the group stage: PSG qualified as runner-up in Group A having faced Arsenal, Basel, and having achieved a nine-point lead over 3rd-placed Ludogorets Razgrad; Barcelona qualified as leaders of Group C, 10 points ahead of Borussia Mönchengladbach in third place and leading 2nd-place Manchester City by six points.

The first leg was played on 14 February at the Parc des Princes in Paris; both teams were in good shape with Paris Saint-Germain coming from a 3–0 away win at Bordeaux in Ligue 1 and Barcelona thrashing Alavés in a 6–0 away win in La Liga. Ángel Di María put PSG in front on 18 minutes with a free kick after Barcelona's Samuel Umtiti committed a foul. Julian Draxler made it 2–0 with a low shot in the 40th minute, assisted by Marco Verratti. After 55 minutes, Di María scored again from a shot outside the box. Edinson Cavani scored the final goal of the game in the 72nd minute, securing the 4–0 win. Barcelona achieved only one shot on target during the whole match.

The second leg was played on 8 March at the Camp Nou in Barcelona. The two teams again came into the match having won their league games: Barcelona won 5–0 at home against Celta Vigo while Paris Saint-Germain won 1–0, also at home, against Nancy.

== Match ==
=== Summary ===
==== First half ====
Three minutes into the match, Luis Suárez scored the first goal of the game after heading the ball over the line before it was cleared by Thomas Meunier. Paris Saint-Germain's Layvin Kurzawa scored an own goal in an attempt to block a shot by Andrés Iniesta in the 40th minute.

==== Second half ====
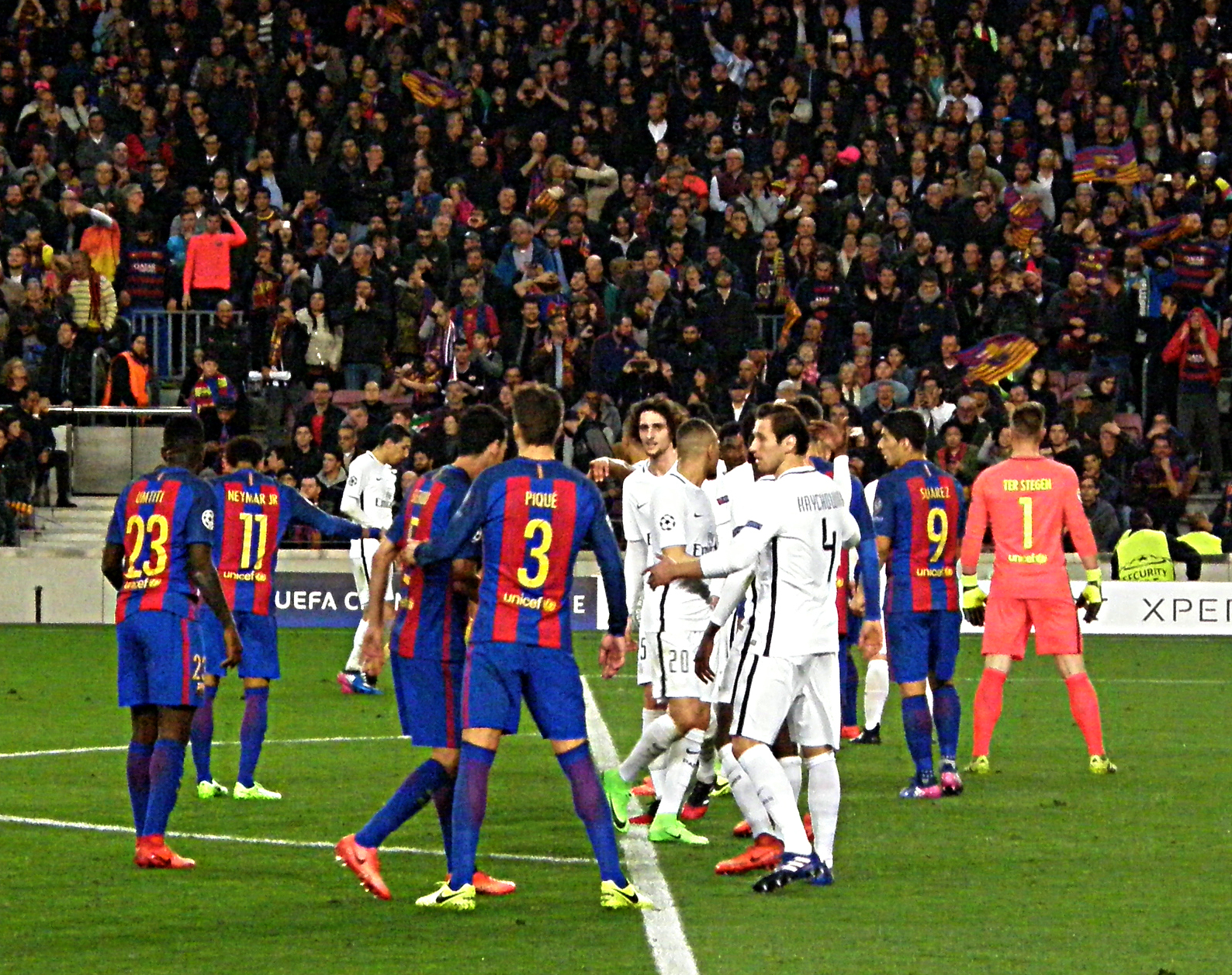
Players prepare for a free kick moments before Barcelona's sixth goal.

Five minutes after the restart, Neymar was fouled by Thomas Meunier in the penalty box, and Lionel Messi converted the penalty. Edinson Cavani scored Paris Saint-Germain's only goal in the 62nd minute, leaving them requiring three more to win due to the away goals rule now favoring PSG, who scored one away goal compared to Barcelona, who scored none. Neymar scored two goals in the closing stages – a free kick in the 88th minute and a penalty kick when Luis Suárez was fouled in the first minute of injury time – to make it 5–1. In the final seconds of the match, Neymar delivered a cross into the penalty area. Sergi Roberto scored Barcelona's sixth and final goal in the fifth minute of injury time, thus winning the game 6–1 and advancing to the quarter finals 6–5 on aggregate.

=== Details ===
8 March 2017
20:45 UTC+1

Barcelona (Spain)	6–1	(France) Paris Saint-Germain
L. Suárez 3'; Kurzawa 40' (o.g.); Messi 50' (pen.); Neymar 88', 90+1' (pen.); Roberto 90+5'	Report	Cavani 62'

Camp Nou, Barcelona
Attendance: 96,290
Referee: Deniz Aytekin (Germany)

Barcelona	Paris Saint-Germain

GK	1	(Germany) Marc-André ter Stegen
CB	14	(Argentina) Javier Mascherano
CB	3	(Spain) Gerard Piqué	(yellow card) 23'
CB	23	(France) Samuel Umtiti
DM	5	(Spain) Sergio Busquets	(yellow card) 36'
RM	4	(Croatia) Ivan Rakitić	(yellow card) 61'	(substituted off) 84'
LM	8	(Spain) Andrés Iniesta (c)		(substituted off) 65'
AM	10	(Argentina) Lionel Messi
RF	12	(Brazil) Rafinha		(substituted off) 76'
CF	9	(Uruguay) Luis Suárez	(yellow card) 67'
LF	11	(Brazil) Neymar	(yellow card) 64'
Substitutes:
GK	13	(Netherlands) Jasper Cillessen
DF	18	(Spain) Jordi Alba
DF	19	(France) Lucas Digne
DF	20	(Spain) Sergi Roberto		(substituted on) 76'
MF	7	(Turkey) Arda Turan		(substituted on) 65'
MF	21	(Portugal) André Gomes		(substituted on) 84'
FW	17	(Spain) Paco Alcácer
Coach:
(Spain) Luis Enrique

GK	1	(Germany) Kevin Trapp
RB	12	(Belgium) Thomas Meunier		(substituted off) 90+3'
CB	5	(Brazil) Marquinhos	(yellow card) 90'
CB	2	(Brazil) Thiago Silva (c)
LB	20	(France) Layvin Kurzawa
CM	25	(France) Adrien Rabiot
CM	14	(France) Blaise Matuidi	(yellow card) 5'
RW	7	(Brazil) Lucas Moura		(substituted off) 55'
AM	6	(Italy) Marco Verratti	(yellow card) 90+4'
LW	23	(Germany) Julian Draxler	(yellow card) 14'	(substituted off) 75'
CF	9	(Uruguay) Edinson Cavani	(yellow card) 42'
Substitutes:
GK	16	(France) Alphonse Areola
DF	3	(France) Presnel Kimpembe
DF	19	(Ivory Coast) Serge Aurier		(substituted on) 75'
MF	4	(Poland) Grzegorz Krychowiak		(substituted on) 90+3'
MF	10	(Argentina) Javier Pastore
MF	11	(Argentina) Ángel Di María		(substituted on) 55'
MF	21	(France) Hatem Ben Arfa
Coach:
(Spain) Unai Emery

=== Statistics ===
Overall
Statistic	Barcelona	Paris Saint-Germain
Goals scored	6	1
Total shots	20	7
Shots on target	10	3
Saves	2	4
Ball possession	75%	25%
Corner kicks	6	4
Fouls committed	16	25
Offsides	2	5
Yellow cards	5	5
Red cards	0	0

== Post-match ==
Paris Saint-Germain's collapse was called a "nightmare" and a "humiliation" in the days following the match. The celebrations from Barcelona fans were described as a "micro earthquake".

Subsequent analyses suggested that Paris Saint-Germain would have won on aggregate had the VAR system been in use. The refereeing of this match was criticized by the international press, in particular by some German dailies such as Der Tagesspiegel. There was speculation that the referee, Deniz Aytekin, could be demoted from his status by the governing body due to some of the decisions he made during the match, particularly the award of Barcelona's second penalty, and for not awarding a penalty to PSG and a red card for Mascherano. After the match, PSG lodged a complaint for ten refereeing errors with UEFA, which, without suspending him, de facto dismissed Deniz Aytekin from the major European posters, entrusting him with only a few minor group matches in the UEFA Champions League the following two seasons.

Two months after the match, Paris Saint-Germain finished second in the French league behind AS Monaco, at the end of a disappointing season (no wins in either the first or second legs against their direct rivals in the standings, Monaco and Nice, against whom PSG conceded a draw at home and two 3–1 defeats away). Since the club was bought by Qatar Sports Investments, this is the second time that PSG has failed to win the competition (after Montpellier in the 2011–2012 season). However, it did win both national cups, the Coupe de la Ligue and the Coupe de France.

In the quarter-finals, Barcelona again suffered a heavy defeat in the first leg of the tie away from home, this time losing 3–0 to Juventus. However, they were unable to repeat their performance of the previous round and were eliminated after drawing 0–0 in the return leg. Barcelona also finished second in their league. Defending Champions League holders Real Madrid retained their title in Europe's most prestigious club competition and also won the Spanish league.

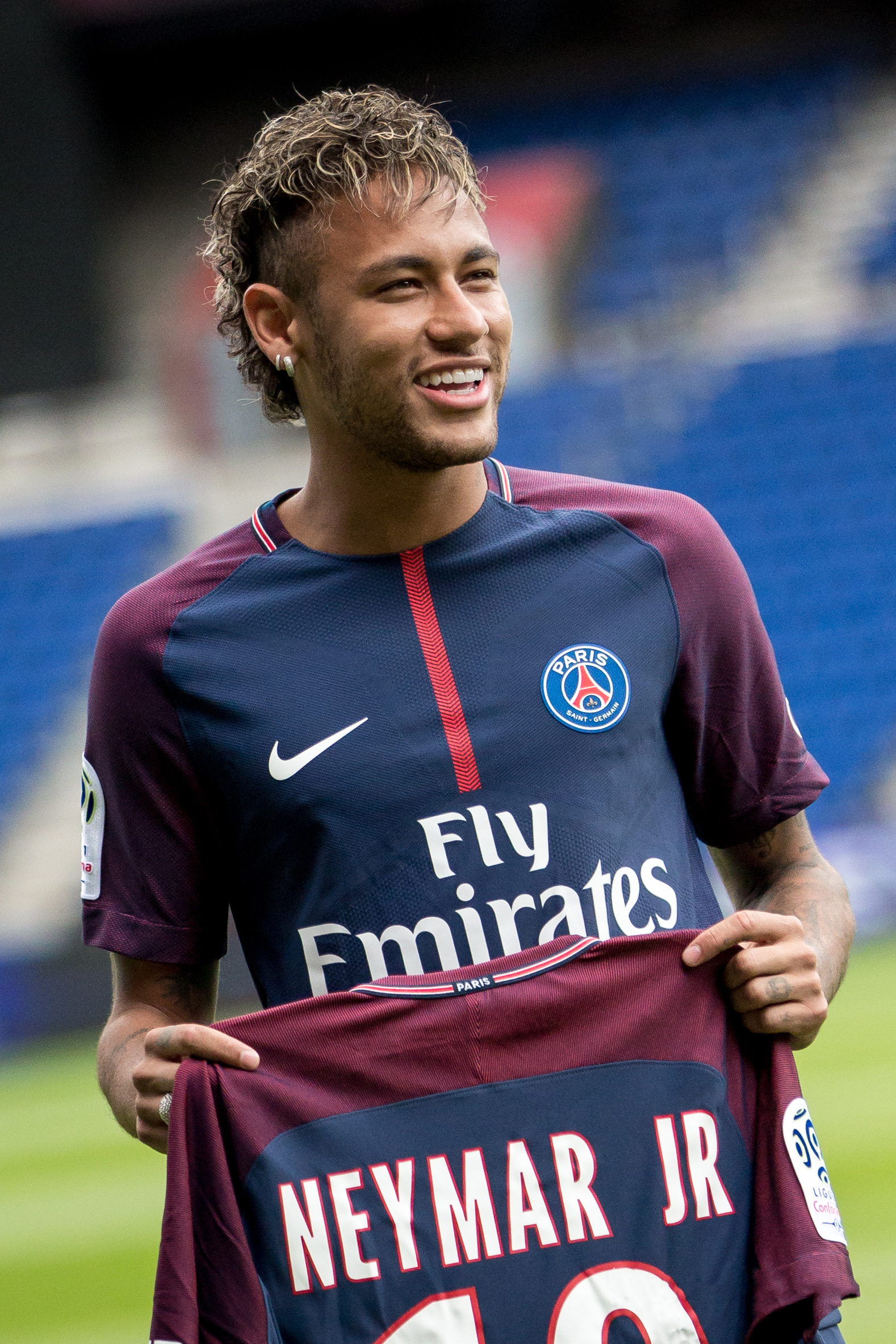
Neymar moved to Paris Saint-Germain after PSG triggered his €222 million release clause.

One of the tie's main protagonists, Brazilian forward Neymar, was at the centre of a different matter involving the two clubs in August 2017 when he moved from Barcelona to Paris Saint-Germain for a world record transfer fee.

In October 2022, PSG's striker Edinson Cavani declared to Spanish sports website Relevo that he was so affected by the defeat that he needed psychological therapy to overcome the shock.

== Subsequent meetings ==
In the round of 16 of the 2020–21 UEFA Champions League, Barcelona and Paris Saint-Germain once again faced off against each other. A major talking point for the media was the return of Neymar to Barcelona, although he was ruled out of the first leg with an injury. Regardless, PSG won the match 4–1 at the Camp Nou, with a hat-trick from Kylian Mbappé. In the second leg, a still Neymar-less PSG side managed to hold on to a 1–1 draw, beating Barça 5–2 on aggregate and advancing to the quarter-finals. This match proved to be Lionel Messi's last in the Champions League with Barcelona, as he joined PSG in the following transfer window.

The clubs met again, this time at the quarter-final stage, in the 2023–24 season, with Paris Saint-Germain now coached by Luis Enrique. Barcelona won the first leg in France 3–2, and went up a further goal at home, but eventually lost 1–4 (aggregate 4–6) after Ronald Araújo was sent off in the first half while the score was 4–2 on aggregate for Barcelona. An additional talking point was Ousmane Dembélé facing his former club Barcelona, which he had left a year prior; he went on to score in both legs of the tie, and was heavily whistled in Barcelona. The outcome was regarded as "revenge" for the Remontada by several media outlets and observers.

Unai Emery, now the coach of Aston Villa, faced Luis Enrique's Paris Saint-Germain in the 2024–25 season at the quarter-final stage. Emery's return to Paris Saint-Germain was seen as a chance for him to 'exorcise the personal demons of the so-called "La Remontada"', since that 6–1 loss was a defining moment of Emery's career. Aston Villa were eliminated by PSG 5–4 on aggregate at home, losing the first leg 3–1 and winning the second leg 3–2 with their comeback attempt falling short.

In the 2025–26 season, the two clubs were drawn against each other again in the league phase, with PSG entering the match as defending champions for the first time. The match took place on 1 October 2025, with PSG winning 2–1 thanks to goals from Senny Mayulu and late heroics from Gonçalo Ramos. As a result, PSG became the first club in history to win three consecutive away games against Barcelona in a major European competition. PSG's victory attracted widespread praise due to their injury list consisting of key attackers including Dembélé, Désiré Doué and Khvicha Kvaratskhelia.

== See also ==
- Super Bowl LI, another large comeback in 2017
- 2026 NBA Finals Game 4 between New York Knicks and San Antonio Spurs, a large comeback that is being compared to La Remontada
- FC Barcelona 2–8 FC Bayern Munich
- 1997 UEFA Cup Winners' Cup final – contested by the same teams
- 2016–17 FC Barcelona season
- 2016–17 Paris Saint-Germain F.C. season
- FC Barcelona in international football
- Paris Saint-Germain FC in international football
