= 2025 UEFA Champions League final =

Football match in Munich, Germany

- Match programme cover
- Event: 2024–25 UEFA Champions League
Paris Saint-Germain	Inter Milan
(France)	(Italy)
5	0
- Date: 31 May 2025
- Venue: Allianz Arena, Munich
- Man of the Match: Désiré Doué (Paris Saint-Germain)
- Referee: István Kovács (Romania)
- Attendance: 64,327
- Weather: Partly cloudy night 24 °C (75 °F); 47% humidity

The 2025 UEFA Champions League final was the final match of the 2024–25 UEFA Champions League, the 70th season of Europe's premier club football tournament organised by UEFA, and the 33rd season since it was renamed from the European Champion Clubs' Cup to the UEFA Champions League. It was held at the Allianz Arena in Munich, Germany, on 31 May 2025, between French club Paris Saint-Germain and Italian club Inter Milan. This was Inter’s second Champions League Final in three years, the last being in 2023, where they lost to Manchester City 1-0. This was PSG’s first Champions League Final since 2020, where they also lost 1-0, but to Bayern Munich.

Paris Saint-Germain won the match 5–0 for their first European Cup title, marking the second final victory by a French club since Marseille in 1993. Their margin of victory was the largest in any of the main European men's club competitions (Note: The main European men's club competitions also includes the Cup Winners' Cup (defunct), UEFA Cup/Europa League and (Europa) Conference League.) final, with their goal tally only surpassed in one European Cup final by Real Madrid's seven in 1960. In doing so, Paris Saint-Germain completed a continental treble, the first of a French club, while Luis Enrique became the second manager since Pep Guardiola to have won the treble twice. As winners, Paris Saint-Germain earned the right to play against Tottenham Hotspur, winners of the 2024–25 UEFA Europa League, in the 2025 UEFA Super Cup, and automatically qualified for the 2025 FIFA Intercontinental Cup final and the 2029 FIFA Club World Cup. The match would also be Simone Inzaghi's final match as manager of Inter Milan as he would leave his post three days after the final by mutual consent.

== Background ==
Paris Saint-Germain reached their second Champions League final and the first since 2020, when they lost to Bayern Munich. This was the fifth European final for them, having previously also appeared in two consecutive finals of the UEFA Cup Winners' Cup, winning the 1996 final 1–0 against Rapid Wien before losing by the same scoreline against Barcelona while attempting to defend their title in 1997. The club also contested the 1996 UEFA Super Cup, losing 9–2 on aggregate to Juventus. Paris Saint-Germain attempted to become only the second French team to win the European Cup/Champions League, following the success of their rivals Marseille in 1993—with the final also taking place in Munich—and the first French club to complete a continental treble, having won the Ligue 1 and the Coupe de France. The club had won the Trophée des Champions (super cup) earlier in the season, thus had a chance for a clean sweep of titles available to them. Their manager, Luis Enrique, was aiming for a second continental treble, having done so with Barcelona in the 2014–15 season. Since he was successful, he became the second manager to achieve such a feat after fellow former Barcelona player and manager Pep Guardiola, who achieved so in 2008–09 with Barcelona and in 2022–23 with Manchester City. He also became the seventh manager to win the European Cup/Champions League with different clubs.

This was Inter Milan's thirteenth European final and seventh European Cup/Champions League final appearance, having won 3–1 in 1964 against Real Madrid, 1–0 against Benfica at home in 1965 and 2–0 against Bayern Munich in 2010, resulting in Inter completing the continental treble; they also lost 2–1 to Celtic in 1967, 2–0 to Ajax in 1972 and 1–0 to Manchester City in 2023, all of which enabled those clubs to win the continental treble themselves. The club had also contested five UEFA Cup/UEFA Europa League finals, winning in 1991, 1994, and 1998 as well as losing in 1997 and 2020. They also contested the 2010 UEFA Super Cup, losing 2–0 to Atlético Madrid. Inter Milan were the most recent Italian club to win the Champions League; since 2010 only one other Italian club—their rivals Juventus—had reached the Champions League final, losing in 2015 and 2017. Simone Inzaghi was aiming for his first European title as manager and the second in his football career, having won against Manchester United in the 1999 UEFA Super Cup as a Lazio player. Their midfielder Henrikh Mkhitaryan was aiming to become the eleventh player to have won all three major European trophies and the first to have achieved that with three different clubs, having won the 2016–17 UEFA Europa League with Manchester United and the 2021–22 UEFA Europa Conference League with Roma.

The clubs had never met in any competitive matches, but had faced each other in five exhibition games.

The match was the first Champions League final without a club from England, Spain or Germany since Portuguese side Porto defeated French representative Monaco in 2004.

=== Previous finals ===
In the following table, finals until 1992 were in the European Cup era and since 1993 were in the UEFA Champions League era.

Team	Previous final appearances (bold indicates winners)
(France) Paris Saint-Germain	1 (2020)
(Italy) Inter Milan	6 (**1964**, **1965**, 1967, 1972, **2010**, 2023)

== Venue ==
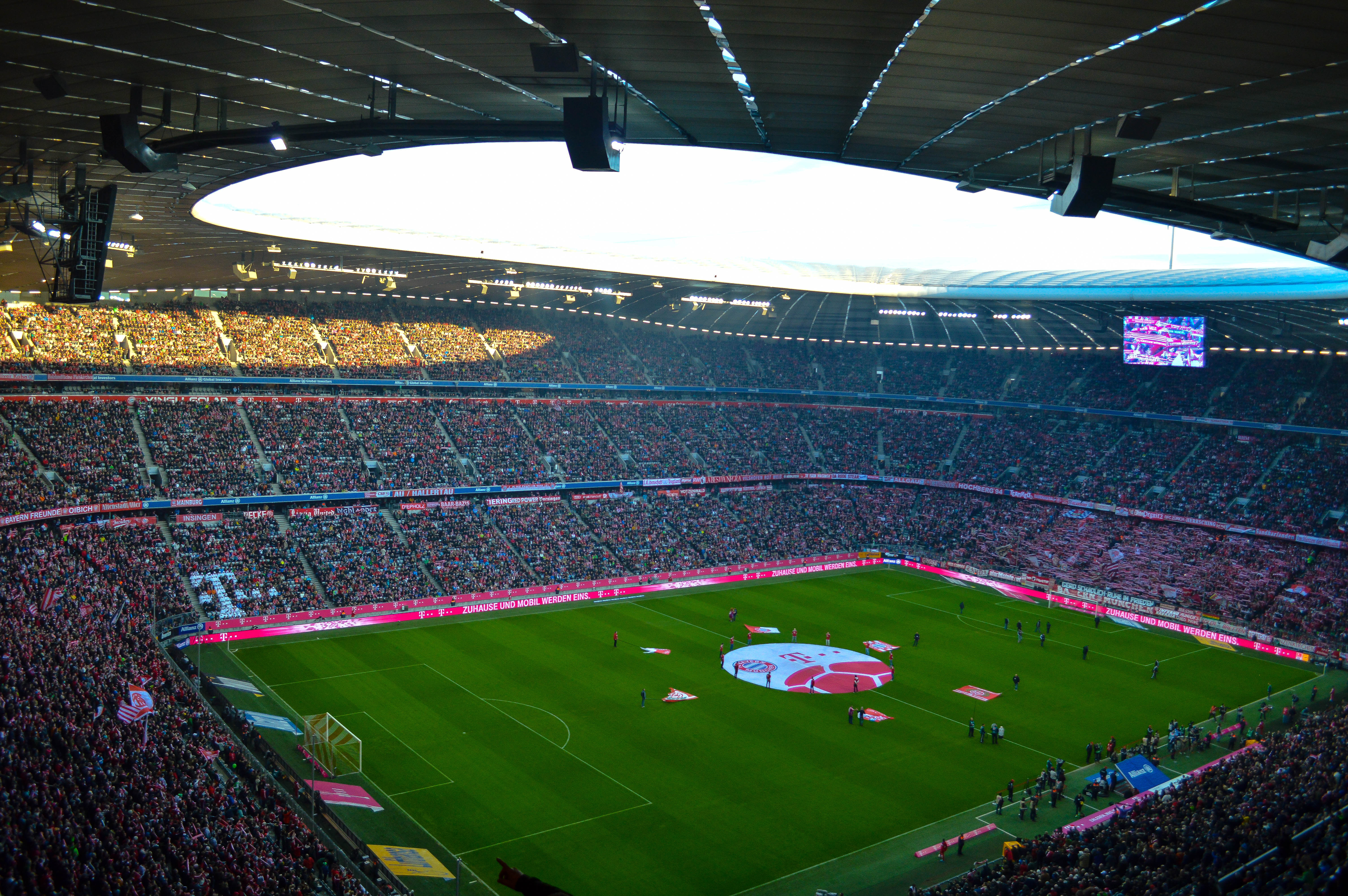
The Allianz Arena in Munich hosted the final.

This was the second UEFA Champions League final hosted at the Allianz Arena in Munich; the first was held in 2012. Overall, it was the fifth European Cup final to be held in Munich, with the 1979, 1993, 1997, and 2012 finals taking place at the Olympiastadion. Each of the previous four finals played in Munich saw a first-time winner of the competition crowned (Nottingham Forest in 1979, Marseille in 1993, Borussia Dortmund in 1997, and Chelsea in 2012). The final also was the ninth to take place in Germany, having also taken place in Stuttgart in 1959 and 1988, Gelsenkirchen in 2004 and Berlin in 2015, equalling the record of nine European Cup finals held in Italy and England. The Allianz Arena previously hosted matches at the 2006 FIFA World Cup, and was chosen as a host venue for UEFA Euro 2020 and UEFA Euro 2024.

=== Host selection ===
On 16 July 2021, the UEFA Executive Committee announced that the Atatürk Olympic Stadium in Istanbul would host the 2023 UEFA Champions League final instead of Munich. This was because Istanbul twice had the Champions League final intended for their city relocated due to the COVID-19 pandemic. Originally planned as hosts for the 2020 final, the match was moved to Lisbon and the final hosts shifted back a year, with Istanbul instead awarded the 2021 final. However, weeks prior to the final, the 2021 fixture was moved to Porto due to travel restrictions.

Munich, originally selected to host the 2022 final by the UEFA Executive Committee during their meeting in Ljubljana, Slovenia on 24 September 2019, was later planned to host the 2023 final after the shifting of the final hosts. However, the city was awarded the 2025 final instead after being bumped from 2023 by Istanbul.

== Route to the final ==
Note: In all results below, the score of the finalist is given first (H: home; A: away).

(France) Paris Saint-Germain				Round	(Italy) Inter Milan			
Opponent	Result			League phase	Opponent	Result		
(Spain) Girona	1–0 (H)			Matchday 1	(England) Manchester City	0–0 (A)		
(England) Arsenal	0–2 (A)			Matchday 2	(Serbia) Red Star Belgrade	4–0 (H)		
(Netherlands) PSV Eindhoven	1–1 (H)			Matchday 3	(Switzerland) Young Boys	1–0 (A)		
(Spain) Atlético Madrid	1–2 (H)			Matchday 4	(England) Arsenal	1–0 (H)		
(Germany) Bayern Munich	0–1 (A)			Matchday 5	(Germany) RB Leipzig	1–0 (H)		
(Austria) Red Bull Salzburg	3–0 (A)			Matchday 6	(Germany) Bayer Leverkusen	0–1 (A)		
(England) Manchester City	4–2 (H)			Matchday 7	(Czech Republic) Sparta Prague	1–0 (A)		
(Germany) VfB Stuttgart	4–1 (A)			Matchday 8	(France) Monaco	3–0 (H)		
15th place Advanced to knockout phase play-offs				Final position	4th place Advanced to round of 16			
Opponent	Agg.	1st leg	2nd leg	Knockout phase	Opponent	Agg.	1st leg	2nd leg
(France) Brest	10–0	3–0 (A)	7–0 (H)	Play-offs	Bye			
(England) Liverpool	1–1 (4–1 p)	0–1 (H)	1–0 (a.e.t.) (A)	Round of 16	(Netherlands) Feyenoord	4–1	2–0 (A)	2–1 (H)
(England) Aston Villa	5–4	3–1 (H)	2–3 (A)	Quarter-finals	(Germany) Bayern Munich	4–3	2–1 (A)	2–2 (H)
(England) Arsenal	3–1	1–0 (A)	2–1 (H)	Semi-finals	(Spain) Barcelona	7–6	3–3 (A)	4–3 (a.e.t.) (H)

== Pre-match ==
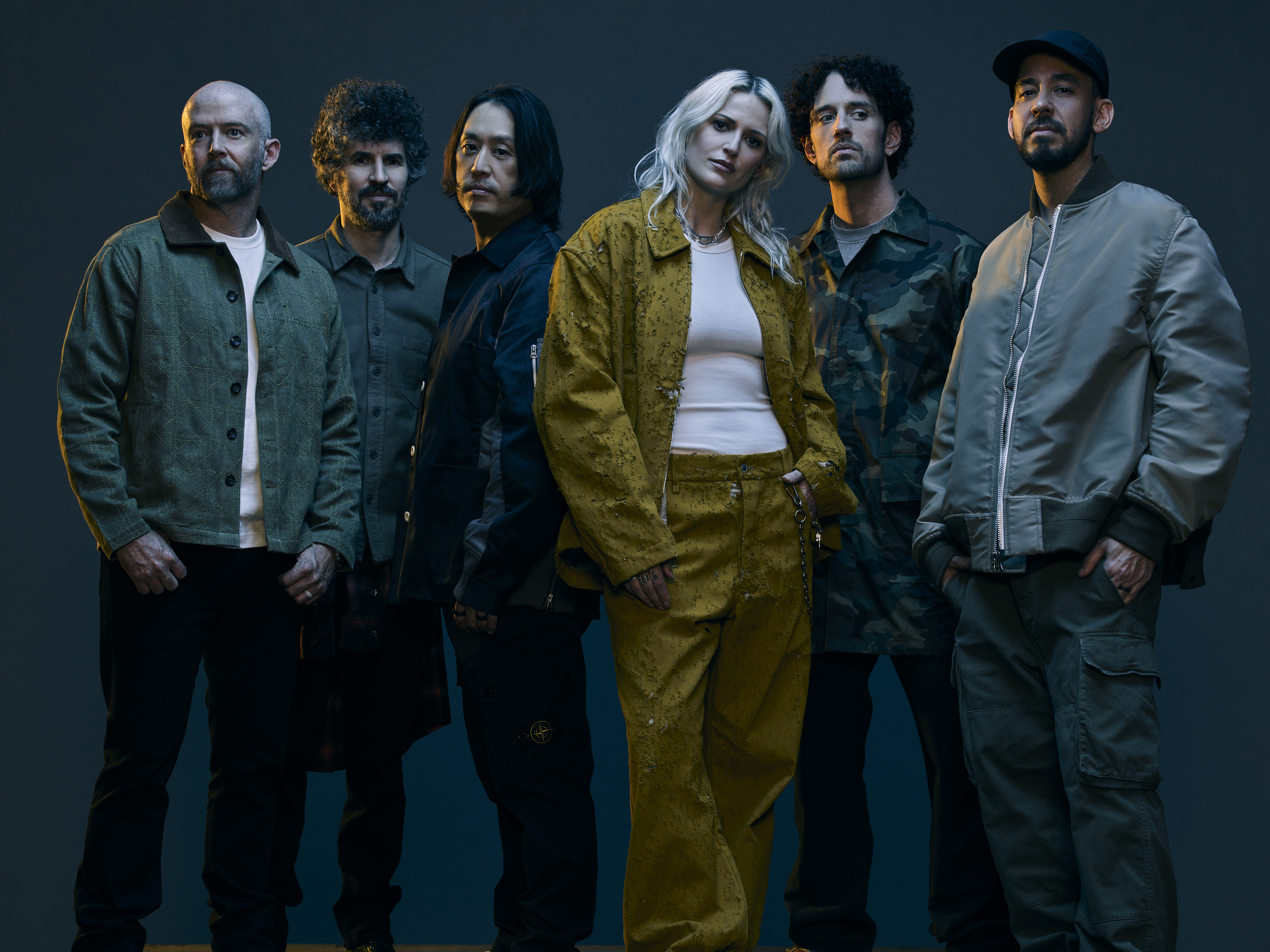
Linkin Park, the headline act of the opening ceremony.

The visual identity of the 2025 UEFA Champions League final was unveiled on 28 January 2025. On 16 April, American rock band Linkin Park was named as the headline act of the opening ceremony. On 26 May, German violinist David Garrett was announced to play a rearranged version of the White Stripes' "Seven Nation Army" on the trophy presentation prior to the teams' entrance.

== Match ==
=== Summary ===
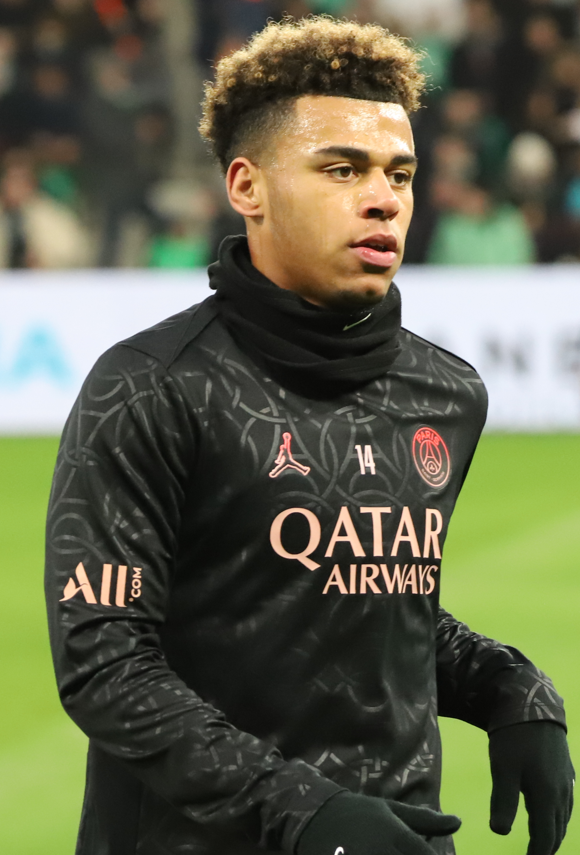
Désiré Doué, scorer of a brace in the final, was named man of the match.

Paris Saint-Germain started the match by pressuring Inter and with high intensity. In the 12th minute, Vitinha threaded a pass to Doué inside the box, who then found the unmarked Achraf Hakimi near the back post, slotting the ball in to give Paris an early lead. Their second goal came eight minutes later, with Willian Pacho acrobatically clearing the ball on the end line to start a counterattack. Ousmane Dembélé was found down the pitch, who then crossed the ball to Doué on the edge of the box, whose shot was deflected off Federico Dimarco and past a helpless Yann Sommer. Inter Milan missed opportunities to cut the deficit before half-time, with Francesco Acerbi (23') and Marcus Thuram (37') missing their headers. Paris Saint-Germain also had additional opportunities before the break, with Dembelé (44') and Khvicha Kvaratskhelia (45+2') missing both.

In the first minute of the second half, Paris Saint-Germain's Kvaratskhelia missed a shot. Inter Milan's Hakan Çalhanoğlu then took a free kick but hit the ball wide. In the 50th minute, Inter's Nicolò Barella protested to the referee that Marquinhos had committed a handball offence, but the referee disagreed and did not give a penalty. Inter took off Benjamin Pavard and Dimarco, and replaced them with Yann Bisseck and Nicola Zalewski. Two minutes after coming on, Zalewski was booked for a slide tackle on Fabián Ruiz. In the 58th minute, Inter Milan's head coach Simone Inzaghi was booked for protesting one of the referee's decisions. In the 61st minute, Inter made two more substitutions, Matteo Darmian and Carlos Augusto for Mkhitaryan and Bisseck (who was brought off after a knee hyperextension). Two minutes later, Paris Saint-Germain scored a third goal with Doué finding the net after a through ball from Vitinha following a counterattack started by Dembele and Vitinha; Doué was booked for removing his shirt as his celebration. In the 67th minute, he was replaced by Bradley Barcola. In the 69th minute, Thuram was booked for a foul on Ruiz, as was Acerbi four minutes later. Inter Milan made another substitution in the 69th minute with Kristjan Asllani replacing Çalhanoğlu. In the 73rd minute, Kvaratskhelia scored a fourth goal for Paris Saint-Germain, after a through ball from Dembélé to get behind Inter's defense near the halfway line. Three minutes later, Thuram got Inter's first shot on target of the match, but the ball was caught by goalkeeper Gianluigi Donnarumma. Paris Saint-Germain went on to make more substitutions: Nuno Mendes was replaced by Lucas Hernandez, and then Kvaratskhelia, João Neves, and Ruiz were substituted for Gonçalo Ramos, Warren Zaïre-Emery, and Senny Mayulu, who scored the fifth goal of the game from a tight angle just three minutes after coming on.

=== Details ===
The "home" team (for administrative purposes) was predetermined as the winner of semi-final 1 (Paris Saint-Germain).

31 May 2025
21:00 UTC+2

Paris Saint-Germain (France)	5–0	(Italy) Inter Milan
Hakimi 12'; Doué 20', 63'; Kvaratskhelia 73'; Mayulu 86'	Report

Allianz Arena, Munich
Attendance: 64,327
Referee: István Kovács (Romania)

Paris Saint-Germain	Inter Milan

GK	1	(Italy) Gianluigi Donnarumma
RB	2	(Morocco) Achraf Hakimi	(yellow card) 90'
CB	5	(Brazil) Marquinhos (c)
CB	51	(Ecuador) Willian Pacho
LB	25	(Portugal) Nuno Mendes		(substituted off) 78'
CM	87	(Portugal) João Neves		(substituted off) 84'
CM	17	(Portugal) Vitinha
CM	8	(Spain) Fabián Ruiz		(substituted off) 84'
RF	14	(France) Désiré Doué	(yellow card) 65'	(substituted off) 66'
CF	10	(France) Ousmane Dembélé
LF	7	(Georgia (country)) Khvicha Kvaratskhelia		(substituted off) 84'
Substitutes:
GK	39	(Russia) Matvey Safonov
GK	80	(Spain) Arnau Tenas
DF	3	(France) Presnel Kimpembe
DF	21	(France) Lucas Hernandez		(substituted on) 78'
DF	35	(Brazil) Lucas Beraldo
MF	19	(South Korea) Lee Kang-in
MF	24	(France) Senny Mayulu		(substituted on) 84'
MF	33	(France) Warren Zaïre-Emery		(substituted on) 84'
FW	9	(Portugal) Gonçalo Ramos		(substituted on) 84'
FW	29	(France) Bradley Barcola		(substituted on) 66'
FW	49	(France) Ibrahim Mbaye
Manager:
(Spain) Luis Enrique

GK	1	(Switzerland) Yann Sommer
CB	28	(France) Benjamin Pavard		(substituted off) 53'
CB	15	(Italy) Francesco Acerbi	(yellow card) 71'
CB	95	(Italy) Alessandro Bastoni
RM	2	(Netherlands) Denzel Dumfries
CM	23	(Italy) Nicolò Barella
CM	20	(Turkey) Hakan Çalhanoğlu		(substituted off) 70'
CM	22	(Armenia) Henrikh Mkhitaryan		(substituted off) 62'
LM	32	(Italy) Federico Dimarco		(substituted off) 53'
CF	9	(France) Marcus Thuram	(yellow card) 69'
CF	10	(Argentina) Lautaro Martínez (c)
Substitutes:
GK	12	(Italy) Raffaele Di Gennaro
GK	13	(Spain) Josep Martínez
DF	6	(Netherlands) Stefan de Vrij
DF	30	(Brazil) Carlos Augusto		(substituted on) 62'
DF	31	(Germany) Yann Aurel Bisseck		(substituted on) 53' (substituted off) 62'
DF	36	(Italy) Matteo Darmian		(substituted on) 62'
MF	7	(Poland) Piotr Zieliński
MF	16	(Italy) Davide Frattesi
MF	21	(Albania) Kristjan Asllani		(substituted on) 70'
MF	59	(Poland) Nicola Zalewski	(yellow card) 56'	(substituted on) 53'
FW	8	(Austria) Marko Arnautović
FW	99	(Iran) Mehdi Taremi
Manager:
(Italy) Simone Inzaghi			(yellow card) 58'

Man of the Match:
Désiré Doué (Paris Saint-Germain)

Assistant referees:
Mihai Marica (Romania)
Ferencz Tunyogi (Romania)
Fourth official:
João Pinheiro (Portugal)
Reserve assistant referee:
Bruno Jesus (Portugal)
Video assistant referee:
Dennis Higler (Netherlands)
Assistant video assistant referee:
Cătălin Popa (Romania)
Support video assistant referee:
Pol van Boekel (Netherlands)

Match rules

- 90 minutes
- 30 minutes of extra time if necessary
- Penalty shoot-out if scores still level
- Maximum of twelve named substitutes
- Maximum of five substitutions, with a sixth allowed in extra time
- Maximum of three substitution opportunities, with a fourth allowed in extra time

=== Statistics ===
First half
Statistic	Paris Saint-Germain	Inter Milan
Goals scored	2	0
Total shots	13	2
Shots on target	5	0
Saves	0	3
Ball possession	61%	39%
Corner kicks	3	2
Fouls committed	5	1
Offsides	0	1
Yellow cards	0	0
Red cards	0	0

Second half
Statistic	Paris Saint-Germain	Inter Milan
Goals scored	3	0
Total shots	10	6
Shots on target	3	2
Saves	2	0
Ball possession	57%	43%
Corner kicks	1	4
Fouls committed	8	6
Offsides	0	4
Yellow cards	2	4
Red cards	0	0

Overall
Statistic	Paris Saint-Germain	Inter Milan
Goals scored	5	0
Total shots	23	8
Shots on target	8	2
Saves	2	3
Ball possession	59%	41%
Corner kicks	4	6
Fouls committed	13	7
Offsides	0	5
Yellow cards	2	4
Red cards	0	0

== Post-match ==
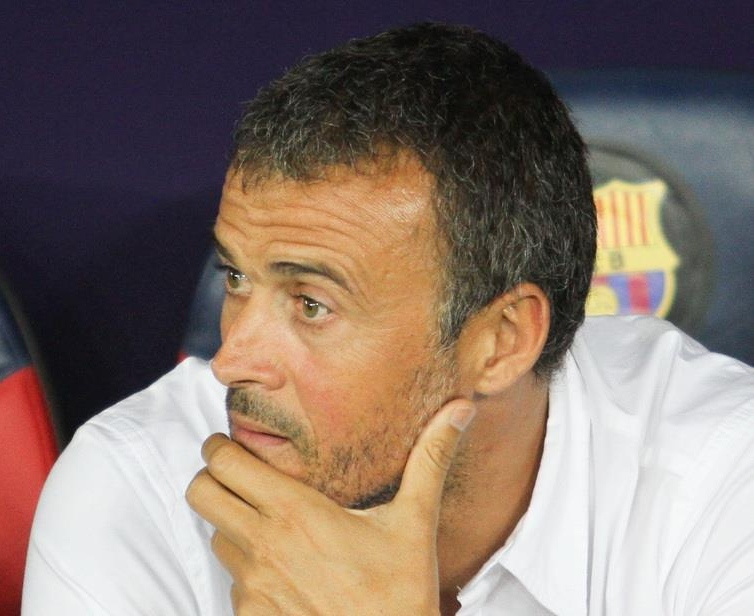
Paris Saint-Germain's Luis Enrique won both his second Champions League title and continental treble as manager.

With their victory, Paris Saint-Germain won their first Champions league title, the 24th team to do so. It also marked the second final to be won by a French club, after Marseille in 1993. Paris Saint-Germain also completed the eleventh continental treble in European football history, doing so as the ninth overall team and first French club. It was the fourth trophy of the season for Paris Saint-Germain, having also won the Trophée des Champions. Luis Enrique won his second Champions League title as manager, having previously won with Barcelona in 2015 as part of a treble. With the victory, he became the 21st coach to win multiple finals and the seventh to do so with multiple clubs. Additionally, he became the second manager to win multiple trebles after fellow Spaniard Pep Guardiola, who also won his first treble with Barcelona.

Paris Saint-Germain's five unanswered goals set a record for the largest margin of victory in the final of any of the main European men's club competitions; for a European Cup final, this result surpassed the four-goal differences in 1960, 1974 replay, 1989 and 1994. It also equaled, with Benfica in 1962, for the second-most goals scored by a team in the final, only behind the seven of Real Madrid in 1960. Senny Mayulu became the second-youngest scorer in a Champions League final, only behind Patrick Kluivert in 1995, while Désiré Doué became the fourth-youngest. Doué was named as the man of the match for his brace, and was subsequently selected as the Champions League Young Player of the Season. The win for Paris Saint-Germain also meant for the first time since Porto's win in the 2003–04 season that a club from outside of Europe's four big leagues (England, Spain, Italy, and Germany) had won the tournament.

Inter Milan's loss was their fourth in a Champions League final (after 1967, 1972, and 2023) and the second in three seasons. Having finished second in Serie A and the Supercoppa Italiana and exited the Coppa Italia in the semi-finals, the defeat meant Inter would finish a season without a trophy for the first time since the 2019–20 season, when they also lost a European final. Inter manager Simone Inzaghi called the defeat "painful" and "disappointing" but said Inter would bounce back from the loss like they did in 2023. However, the final turned out to be Inzaghi's last game in charge of Inter as he left the club by mutual consent three days later.

As winners, Paris Saint-Germain qualified for various other competitions. They competed in the 2025 UEFA Super Cup against Tottenham Hotspur, winners of the 2024–25 UEFA Europa League. They also qualified for the final of the 2025 FIFA Intercontinental Cup, where they competed against Flamengo, another continental champion, for the title of annual club world champions. Finally, they qualified for the 2029 FIFA Club World Cup, FIFA's quadrennial club championship.

=== Celebrations and riots ===
Following Paris Saint-Germain's victory, celebrations were held across France overnight. In some areas, disorder broke out and across the country two people were killed and a further 192 were injured, with 559 people being arrested. A 17-year-old boy died after being stabbed in Dax and a 23-year-old man was killed in central Paris after being hit by a vehicle whilst riding a scooter. The interior ministry said that 491 people were arrested in Paris alone and 264 vehicles were set on fire; among the injured were 22 police officers and seven firefighters. Four people were injured in Grenoble after a car ploughed into PSG fans. During the celebrations shops were looted, bus shelters smashed and flares and fireworks set off, with clashes breaking out near the Champs-Élysées and the Parc des Princes. Around 5,400 police were deployed across Paris in anticipation of disorder during the celebrations, and Paris police prefect said the trophy parade would go ahead the next day but with a higher police and military presence.

== See also ==
- 2025 UEFA Europa League final
- 2025 UEFA Conference League final
- 2025 UEFA Women's Champions League final
- Inter Milan in international football
- Paris Saint-Germain FC in international football
- 2024–25 Paris Saint-Germain FC season
- 2024–25 Inter Milan season
- 2025 Paris Saint-Germain celebration riots
