= Deniz Aytekin =

German football referee (born 1978)

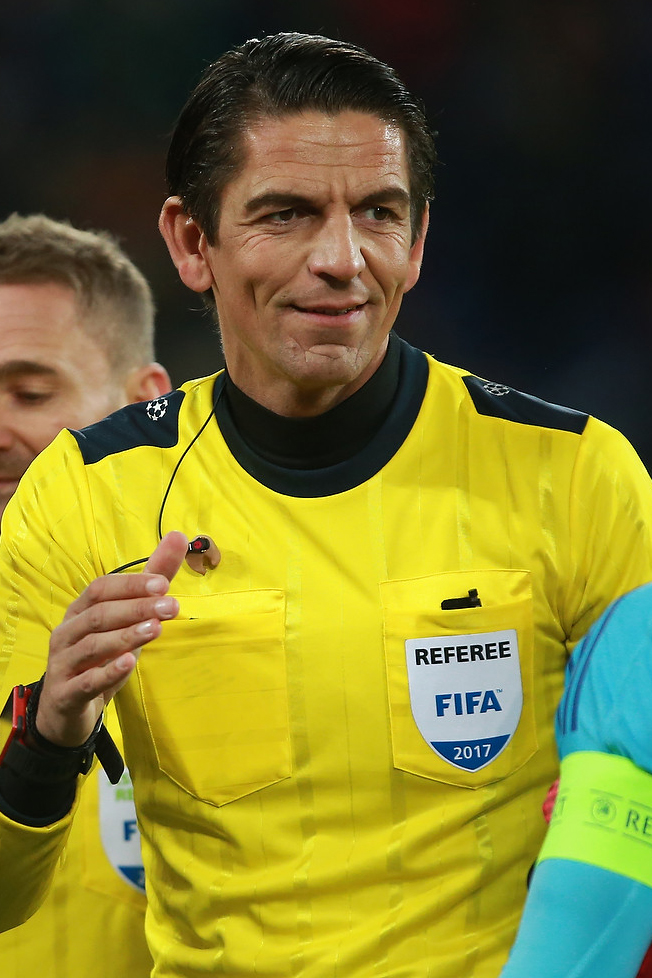
- Aytekin in 2017
- Born: 21 July 1978 (age 48); Nuremberg, West Germany
- Other occupation: Business manager

Domestic
| Years | League | Role |
| 2004–2026 | DFB | Referee |
| 2006–2026 | 2. Bundesliga | Referee |
| 2008–2026 | Bundesliga | Referee |

International
| Years | League | Role |
| 2011–2022 | FIFA listed | Referee |

Deniz Aytekin (born 21 July 1978) is a German former football referee of Turkish descent. He refereed for TSV Altenberg of the Bavarian Football Association. Aytekin is a former FIFA referee, and was ranked as a UEFA elite category referee.

== Refereeing career ==
Aytekin refereed his first Bundesliga match on 27 September 2008 when Hertha played Energie Cottbus in Berlin. Energie Cottbus won the game 1–0, and Aytekin gave out four yellow cards, including one to Cottbus goalkeeper Gerhard Tremmel for time-wasting in the 90th minute. Notably, Aytekin was the referee of the 2016–17 UEFA Champions League round of 16 second leg match between Paris Saint-Germain and Barcelona at the Camp Nou on 8 March 2017. The final score of the match was an infamous 6–1 victory for Barcelona, while the Catalan club had lost by 4 goals to 0 in the first leg. The refereeing of this match was criticized by the international press, in particular by some German dailies such as Der Tagesspiegel.

After the match with Barcelona, PSG lodged a complaint, claiming ten refereeing errors; without suspending him, UEFA de facto dismissed Aytekin from the major European posters, entrusting him with only a few minor group matches in the UEFA Champions League the following two seasons. In April 2017, Aytekin was appointed to referee the 2017 DFB-Pokal final between Borussia Dortmund and Eintracht Frankfurt. On 13 September 2017, during the first day of the Champions League group stage he officiated the match between Maribor and Spartak Moscow (1–1), he narrowly avoided a rocket coming from the stands that house the supporters of the Moscow team.

In October 2017, Aytekin was invited, along with other foreign referees, by the Chinese Federation to referee matches in the Chinese Super League, with the aim of improving the image of a championship shaken by revelations concerning the existence of match-fixing. On 28 July 2022, Aytekin announced that he had put an end to his international career, and that he would only continue refereeing at a national level in Germany.

In August 2025, Aytekin announced that he would retire at the end of the 2025–26 season. He refereed his last match on 16 May 2026 between Bayern Munich and 1. FC Köln on the final matchday of the season.

== Personal life ==
Aytekin is of Turkish descent. He lives in Oberasbach, Bavaria. In addition to his career as a referee, he is an entrepreneur who co-founded the websites Fitnessmarkt.de and Anwalt.de.
