= 1997 UEFA Cup Winners' Cup final =

1997 UEFA Cup Winners' Cup Final
- Match programme cover
- Event: 1996–97 UEFA Cup Winners' Cup
Barcelona	Paris Saint-Germain
(Spain)	(France)
1	0
- Date: 14 May 1997
- Venue: De Kuip, Rotterdam
- Referee: Markus Merk (Germany)
- Attendance: 36,802

The 1997 UEFA Cup Winners' Cup Final was a football match contested between Barcelona of Spain and the cup holders Paris Saint-Germain of France, to determine the winner of the 1996–97 UEFA Cup Winners' Cup and the 37th overall Cup Winners' Cup final. It was held at De Kuip in Rotterdam on 14 May 1997. Barcelona won the match 1–0 thanks to a Ronaldo penalty. The final saw the last instance of the Cup Winners' Cup "jinx" that no club had successfully retained the cup in successive seasons — with Paris Saint-Germain failing to defend the trophy that they won in 1996.

== Route to the final ==
(Spain) Barcelona				Round	(France) Paris Saint-Germain			
Opponent	Agg.	1st leg	2nd leg	Stages	Opponent	Agg.	1st leg	2nd leg
(Cyprus) AEK Larnaca	2–0	2–0 (H)	0–0 (A)	First round	(Liechtenstein) Vaduz	7–0	4–0 (A)	3–0 (H)
(Federal Republic of Yugoslavia) Red Star Belgrade	4–2	3–1 (H)	1–1 (A)	Second round	(Turkey) Galatasaray	6–4	2–4 (A)	4–0 (H)
(Sweden) AIK	4–2	3–1 (H)	1–1 (A)	Quarter-finals	(Greece) AEK Athens	3–0	0–0 (H)	3–0 (A)
(Italy) Fiorentina	3–1	1–1 (H)	2–0 (A)	Semi-finals	(England) Liverpool	3–2	3–0 (H)	0–2 (A)

== Match ==
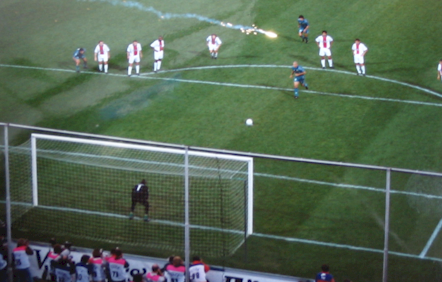
Ronaldo scoring the only goal of the game

=== Details ===
14 May 1997
20:30 CEST

Barcelona (Spain)	1–0	(France) Paris Saint-Germain
Ronaldo 37' (pen.)	Report

De Kuip, Rotterdam
Attendance: 36,802
Referee: Markus Merk (Germany)

Barcelona	Paris Saint-Germain

GK	1	(Portugal) Vítor Baía
RB	2	(Spain) Albert Ferrer
CB	3	(Spain) Abelardo
CB	26	(Portugal) Fernando Couto	(yellow card) 16'
LB	12	(Spain) Sergi Barjuán
CM	5	(Romania) Gheorghe Popescu (c)		(substituted off) 46'
CM	4	(Spain) Pep Guardiola
RW	7	(Portugal) Luís Figo
AM	23	(Spain) Iván de la Peña	(yellow card) 83'	(substituted off) 85'
LW	21	(Spain) Luis Enrique		(substituted off) 89'
CF	9	(Brazil) Ronaldo
Substitutes:
GK	13	(Spain) Carles Busquets
FW	8	(Bulgaria) Hristo Stoichkov		(substituted on) 85'
MF	10	(Brazil) Giovanni
MF	18	(Spain) Guillermo Amor		(substituted on) 46'
FW	19	(Spain) Juan Antonio Pizzi		(substituted on) 89'
Manager:
(England) Bobby Robson

GK	1	(France) Bernard Lama
RB	13	(France) Laurent Fournier	(yellow card) 1'	(substituted off) 58'
CB	4	(France) Bruno Ngotty
CB	6	(France) Paul Le Guen	(yellow card) 51'
LB	22	(France) Didier Domi
CM	19	(France) Jérôme Leroy
CM	8	(France) Vincent Guérin		(substituted off) 68'
CM	15	(France) Benoît Cauet	(yellow card) 82'
AM	10	(Brazil) Raí (c)
CF	11	(France) Patrice Loko		(substituted off) 78'
CF	7	(Brazil) Leonardo
Substitutes:
GK	16	(France) Vincent Fernandez
DF	2	(Portugal) Daniel Kenedy
FW	9	(Panama) Julio Dely Valdés		(substituted on) 68'
DF	17	(France) Jimmy Algerino		(substituted on) 58'
FW	26	(France) Cyrille Pouget		(substituted on) 78'
Manager:
(Brazil) Ricardo Gomes

Assistant referees:
Erich Schneider (Germany)
Hans-Georg Füllbrunn (Germany)
Fourth official:
Hans-Jürgen Weber (Germany)

Match rules

- 90 minutes.
- 30 minutes of golden goal extra time if necessary.
- Penalty shoot-out if scores still level.
- Five named substitutes.
- Maximum of three substitutions.

== See also ==
- 1996–97 UEFA Cup Winners' Cup
- 1997 UEFA Champions League Final
- 1997 UEFA Cup Final
- 1997 UEFA Super Cup
- FC Barcelona in international football competitions
- Paris Saint-Germain FC in international football
