= 1974–75 Paris Saint-Germain FC season =

5th season of Paris Saint-Germain FC

Paris Saint-Germain
1974–75 season
- President: Daniel Hechter
- Manager: Robert Vicot
- Stadium: Parc des Princes; Stade Yves-du-Manoir; Stade Bauer
- Ligue 1: 15th
- Coupe de France: Semi-finals
- Top goalscorer: League: François M'Pelé (21); All: François M'Pelé (31)
- Average home league attendance: 17,456
Home colours	Away colours	Third colours

The 1974–75 season was the 5th season in the history of Paris Saint-Germain FC. PSG played most of their home league matches at the Parc des Princes, while also hosting one match at the Stade Yves-du-Manoir and another at the Stade Bauer, attracting an average of 17,456 spectators per match. The club's president was Daniel Hechter, and the team was managed by Robert Vicot, with Jean-Pierre Dogliani serving as captain. PSG finished 15th in Ligue 1 and reached the semi-finals of the Coupe de France. François M'Pelé was the team's top scorer, netting 31 goals in all competitions, including 21 in the league.

== Players ==
=== Squad ===
Players who featured in at least one official match for the club.

Note: Flags indicate national team as defined under FIFA eligibility rules; some limited exceptions apply. Players may hold more than one non-FIFA nationality.

No.	Pos.	Nation	Player
—	GK	YUG	Ilija Pantelić
—	GK	FRA	Michel Bensoussan
—	GK	FRA	Jacky Planchard
—	DF	FRA	Jacky Novi
—	DF	FRA	Jacky Bade
—	DF	FRA	Éric Renaut
—	DF	FRA	Gérard Cenzato
—	DF	FRA	Louis Cardiet
—	DF	FRA	Christian Quéré
—	DF	FRA	Dominique Lokoli
—	MF	FRA	Denis Bauda
—	MF	FRA	Bernard Dumot

No.	Pos.	Nation	Player
—	MF	ALG	Mustapha Dahleb
—	MF	FRA	Jacques Laposte
—	MF	FRA	Jean Deloffre
—	MF	ITA	Albert Poli
—	MF	FRA	Robin Leclerc
—	FW	FRA	Jean-Pierre Dogliani (captain)
—	FW	FRA	Guy Nosibor
—	FW	FRA	Louis Floch
—	FW	TOG	Othniel Dossevi
—	FW	CGO	François M'Pelé
—	FW	FRA	Christian André
—	FW	FRA	Michel Marella

== Transfers ==
=== Arrivals ===
Players who signed for the club.

Note: Flags indicate national team as defined under FIFA eligibility rules; some limited exceptions apply. Players may hold more than one non-FIFA nationality.

No.	Pos.	Nation	Player
—	GK	FRA	Michel Bensoussan (from PSG Youth Academy)
—	GK	YUG	Ilija Pantelić (from Bastia)
—	DF	FRA	Gérard Cenzato (from Cholet)
—	DF	FRA	Dominique Lokoli (from Choisy-le-Roi)
—	DF	FRA	Jacky Novi (from Nîmes)

No.	Pos.	Nation	Player
—	MF	FRA	Denis Bauda (from Nancy)
—	MF	ALG	Mustapha Dahleb (from Sedan)
—	MF	ITA	Albert Poli (from Angers)
—	FW	FRA	Louis Floch (from Paris FC)

=== Departures ===
Players who left the club.

Note: Flags indicate national team as defined under FIFA eligibility rules; some limited exceptions apply. Players may hold more than one non-FIFA nationality.

No.	Pos.	Nation	Player
—	GK	FRA	Camille Choquier (Retired)
—	GK	FRA	Patrice Py (Free agent)
—	DF	FRA	Didier Ledunois (Free agent)
—	MF	FRA	Jean-Louis Leonetti (Retired)

No.	Pos.	Nation	Player
—	MF	FRA	Michel Llodra (Free agent)
—	FW	FRA	Mordechai Spiegler (to Maccabi Netanya)
—	FW	FRA	Jean-Louis Brost (to Entente BFN)
—	FW	BRA	Armando Monteiro (to Cannes)

== Kits ==
RTL was the shirt sponsor, and Le Coq Sportif was the kit supplier.

Home 1	Home 2	Away	Third

== Competitions ==
=== Overview ===
Competition	First match	Last match	Starting round	Final position	Record							
Competition	First match	Last match	Starting round	Final position	Pld	W	D	L	GF	GA	GD	Win %
Ligue 1	2 August 1974	3 June 1975	Matchday 1	15th	38	12	12	14	57	65	−8	31.58
Coupe de France	2 February 1975	7 June 1975	Round of 64	Semi-finals	9	6	2	1	25	9	+16	66.67
Total					47	18	14	15	82	74	+8	38.30

Source: Competitions

=== Ligue 1 ===
==== League table ====
Pos	Team	Pld	W	D	L	GF	GA	GD	BP	Pts
13	Lille	38	15	5	18	53	56	−3	4	39
14	Nice	38	13	10	15	59	63	−4	3	39
15	Paris Saint-Germain	38	12	12	14	57	65	−8	1	37
16	Troyes	38	12	10	16	46	55	−9	3	37
17	Sochaux	38	11	10	17	41	49	−8	2	34

Source: Histoire du PSG
Rules for classification: 1) points; 2) goal difference; 3) number of goals scored.
Victory: 2 points, Draw: 1 point, Defeat: 0 points, a bonus of 1 point for winning by three or more goals in a match

==== Results by round ====
Round	1	2	3	4	5	6	7	8	9	10	11	12	13	14	15	16	17	18	19	20	21	22	23	24	25	26	27	28	29	30	31	32	33	34	35	36	37	38
Ground	A	A	H	A	H	A	H	A	H	H	A	H	A	H	A	H	A	H	A	H	A	H	A	H	A	H	A	A	H	A	H	A	H	A	H	A	H	H
Result	W	L	D	L	W	L	W	D	D	L	L	W	W	L	W	L	W	D	L	W	L	W	W	D	L	D	W	D	D	L	D	L	W	L	D	D	D	L
Position	4	13	15	18	15	17	14	15	16	16	17	16	15	17	16	16	17	14	15	15	13	12	14	11	14	14	14	13	15	15	15	14	13	14	14	15	15	15

Source: Histoire du PSG
A = Away; H = Home; W = Win; D = Draw; L = Loss

==== Matches ====
2 August 1974 1	Sochaux	0–1	Paris Saint-Germain	Montbéliard
		Report	André 78'	Stadium: Stade Auguste-Bonal; Attendance: 8,089; Referee: Jean-Marie Meeus

9 August 1974 2	Reims	6–1	Paris Saint-Germain	Reims
	Bianchi 24', 38', 46', 52', 65', 69'	Report	M'Pelé 16'	Stadium: Stade Auguste-Delaune; Attendance: 14,894; Referee: Robert Frauciel

13 August 1974 3	Paris Saint-Germain	2–2	Metz	Paris
	M'Pelé 28' (pen.); André 38'	Report	Braun 44', 50'	Stadium: Parc des Princes; Attendance: 13,908; Referee: Guy Mouchotte

16 August 1974 4	Lille	5–0	Paris Saint-Germain	Lille
	Coste 10', 23'; Karasi 65', 68'; Riefa 66'	Report		Stadium: Stade Henri-Jooris; Attendance: 10,248; Referee: Georges Konrath

23 August 1974 5	Paris Saint-Germain	3–2	Angers	Paris
	M'Pelé 3', 70', 80'	Report	Berdoll 2'; Antić 41'	Stadium: Parc des Princes; Attendance: 10,959; Referee: Michel Kitabdjian

27 August 1974 6	Nice	4–2	Paris Saint-Germain	Nice
	Rostagni 17'; Molitor 54', 70'; Musemić 82'	Report	Dogliani 56'; M'Pelé 85'	Stadium: Stade du Ray; Attendance: 10,966; Referee: Jean-Claude Martin

2 September 1974 7	Paris Saint-Germain	2–1	Rennes	Paris
	Dahleb 6', 82'	Report	Redon 89'	Stadium: Parc des Princes; Attendance: 15,195; Referee: Julien Espié

13 September 1974 8	Lyon	4–4	Paris Saint-Germain	Lyon
	Lacombe 68', 79'; Mariot 72'; R. Domenech 74'	Report	A. Domenech 3' (o.g.); Dahleb 32'; Novi 36'; M'Pelé 65'	Stadium: Stade de Gerland; Attendance: 9,126; Referee: Robert Héliès

24 September 1974 9	Paris Saint-Germain	1–1	Bastia	Paris
	Krimau 80' (o.g.)	Report	Krimau 32'	Stadium: Parc des Princes; Attendance: 12,288; Referee: Michel Kitabdjian

27 September 1974 10	Paris Saint-Germain	2–3	Nantes	Paris
	Dahleb 56'; M'Pelé 71' (pen.)	Report	Curioni 17', 25'; Michel 63'	Stadium: Parc des Princes; Attendance: 21,743; Referee: Achille Verbecke

5 October 1974 11	Marseille	4–2	Paris Saint-Germain	Marseille
	Skoblar 12', 39'; Eo 23'; Emon 48'	Report	Dahleb 11'; Dogliani 49'	Stadium: Stade Vélodrome; Attendance: 14,117; Referee: Michel Vautrot

18 October 1974 12	Paris Saint-Germain	3–1	Lens	Paris
	M'Pelé 18', 90'; Nosibor 49'	Report	Novi 73' (o.g.)	Stadium: Parc des Princes; Attendance: 12,757; Referee: Robert Frauciel

26 October 1974 13	Troyes	1–3	Paris Saint-Germain	Troyes
	Parizon 5'	Report	Nosibor 40', 55', 59'	Stadium: Stade de l'Aube; Attendance: 9,331; Referee: Eugène Deleplace

29 October 1974 14	Paris Saint-Germain	0–1	Monaco	Paris
		Report	Novi 75' (o.g.)	Stadium: Parc des Princes; Attendance: 12,241; Referee: Pierre Coquerille

1 November 1974 15	Bordeaux	1–2	Paris Saint-Germain	Bordeaux
	Arribas 58'	Report	Floch 3'; Dahleb 63'	Stadium: Stade Chaban-Delmas; Attendance: 13,027; Referee: Robert Héliès

9 November 1974 16	Paris Saint-Germain	1–1	Nîmes	Paris
	Poli 70'	Report	Kanyan 51'	Stadium: Parc des Princes; Attendance: 17,266; Referee: Roger Machin

20 November 1974 17	Saint-Étienne	3–2	Paris Saint-Germain	Saint-Étienne
	Piazza 73'; Revelli 89'; Bathenay 90'	Report	M'Pelé 15'; Dahleb 81'	Stadium: Stade Geoffroy-Guichard; Attendance: 9,190; Referee: Michel Kitabdjian

24 November 1974 18	Paris Saint-Germain	2–0	Red Star	Paris
	M'Pelé 12'; Dahleb 90'	Report		Stadium: Parc des Princes; Attendance: 28,324; Referee: Jean Bancourt

1 December 1974 19	Strasbourg	2–1	Paris Saint-Germain	Strasbourg
	Gemmrich 26'; Hlevnjak 45'	Report	M'Pelé 36'	Stadium: Stade de la Meinau; Attendance: 11,096; Referee: René Vigliani

8 December 1974 20	Paris Saint-Germain	3–0	Reims	Paris
	M'Pelé 46', 66'; Marella 80'	Report		Stadium: Parc des Princes; Attendance: 31,589; Referee: Robert Héliès

15 December 1974 21	Metz	1–3	Paris Saint-Germain	Metz
	Dehon 21'	Report	Marella 6'; Dahleb 10', 67'	Stadium: Stade Saint-Symphorien; Attendance: 8,393; Referee: Robert Wurtz

22 December 1974 22	Paris Saint-Germain	0–0	Lille	Paris
		Report		Stadium: Parc des Princes; Attendance: 26,324; Referee: Gabriel Besory

12 January 1975 23	Angers	3–1	Paris Saint-Germain	Angers
	Antić 25'; Berdoll 47', 72'	Report	Poli 56'	Stadium: Stade Raymond Kopa; Attendance: 4,954; Referee: André Petit

21 January 1975 24	Paris Saint-Germain	2–1	Nice	Paris
	Dogliani 43'; M'Pelé 57'	Report	Montagnoli 71'	Stadium: Parc des Princes; Attendance: 18,418; Referee: Achille Verbecke

26 January 1975 25	Rennes	2–1	Paris Saint-Germain	Rennes
	Redon 36'; Pokou 60'	Report	Floch 80'	Stadium: Roazhon Park; Attendance: 10,906; Referee: Michel Kitabdjian

9 February 1975 26	Paris Saint-Germain	2–2	Lyon	Colombes
	M'Pelé 77'; Renaut 80'	Report	Valette 19'; Lacombe 79'	Stadium: Stade Yves-du-Manoir; Attendance: 8,155; Referee: Robert Wurtz

23 February 1975 28	Nantes	0–0	Paris Saint-Germain	Nantes
		Report		Stadium: Stade Marcel-Saupin; Attendance: 10,367; Referee: Marcel Bacou

12 March 1975 29	Paris Saint-Germain	1–1	Marseille	Paris
	Dahleb 71'	Report	Jairzinho 90'	Stadium: Parc des Princes; Attendance: 42,247; Referee: Georges Konrath

15 March 1975 30	Lens	3–2	Paris Saint-Germain	Lens
	Elie 6'; Kaiser 50'; Argyroudis 65'	Report	Dahleb 3'; Nosibor 79'	Stadium: Stade Bollaert-Delelis; Attendance: 15,203; Referee: Robert Frauciel

20 March 1975 31	Paris Saint-Germain	0–0	Troyes	Paris
		Report		Stadium: Parc des Princes; Attendance: 5,547; Referee: Marcel Bacou

29 March 1975 27	Bastia	0–2	Paris Saint-Germain	Furiani
		Report	M'Pelé 24', 42'	Stadium: Stade Armand-Cesari; Attendance: 4,990; Referee: Stéphane Frère

1 April 1975 32	Monaco	3–0	Paris Saint-Germain	Monaco
	Pastoriza 2', 90'; Dalger 58'	Report		Stadium: Stade Louis II; Attendance: 2,240; Referee: Michel Vautrot

5 April 1975 33	Paris Saint-Germain	1–0	Bordeaux	Paris
	Dahleb 21'	Report		Stadium: Parc des Princes; Attendance: 8,958; Referee: Michel Kitabdjian

19 April 1975 34	Nîmes	2–1	Paris Saint-Germain	Nîmes
	Luizinho 24'; Girard 83'	Report	Floch 47'	Stadium: Stade Jean-Bouin; Attendance: 7,868; Referee: Roger Machin

30 April 1975 35	Paris Saint-Germain	2–2	Saint-Étienne	Paris
	M'Pelé 45'; Dogliani 81'	Report	Revelli 28'; Santini 54'	Stadium: Parc des Princes; Attendance: 38,600; Referee: Achille Verbecke

3 May 1975 36	Red Star	1–1	Paris Saint-Germain	Saint-Ouen-sur-Seine
	Combin 15'	Report	M'Pelé 80' (pen.)	Stadium: Stade Bauer; Attendance: 7,000; Referee: Michel Kitabdjian

30 May 1975 37	Paris Saint-Germain	1–1	Strasbourg	Paris
	Novi 60'	Report	Jarosik 46'	Stadium: Parc des Princes; Attendance: 5,187; Referee: Jean-Claude Martin

3 June 1975 38	Paris Saint-Germain	0–1	Sochaux	Paris
		Report	Piasecki 25'	Stadium: Parc des Princes; Attendance: 5,956; Referee: Robert Héliès

=== Coupe de France ===
==== Round of 64 ====
2 February 1975 Round of 64	Paris Saint-Germain	2–2 (a.e.t.)	Saint-Dié	Vittel
	Floch 53'; M'Pelé 70' (pen.)	Report	Monnin 14'; Mayet 80' (pen.)	Stadium: Stade Jean Bouloumié; Attendance: 5,925; Referee: Pierre Coquerille

12 February 1975 Round of 64 replay	Paris Saint-Germain	4–0	Saint-Dié	Tomblaine
	Dogliani 30'; M'Pelé 40', 68'; Dossevi 85'	Report		Stadium: Stade Marcel Picot; Attendance: 10,000; Referee: Achille Verbecke

==== Round of 32 ====
2 March 1975 First leg	Sète	2–4	Paris Saint-Germain	Sète
	Liciardi 4'; Granier 89'	Report	Dahleb 8', 51', 80'; Combettes 43' (o.g.)	Stadium: Georges-Bayrou Stadium; Attendance: 5,000; Referee: Gabriel Besory

9 March 1975 Second leg	Paris Saint-Germain	4–0 (8–2 agg.)	Sète	Saint-Ouen-sur-Seine
	M'Pelé 15', 83'; Floch 19'; Dahleb 87'	Report		Stadium: Stade Bauer; Attendance: 3,593; Referee: Jean-Claude Martin

==== Round of 16 ====
11 April 1975 First leg	Sochaux	0–3	Paris Saint-Germain	Montbéliard
		Report	Dahleb 31'; M'Pelé 50' (pen.); Floch 52'	Stadium: Stade Auguste-Bonal; Attendance: 5,056; Referee: René Vigliani

16 April 1975 Second leg	Paris Saint-Germain	2–0 (5–0 agg.)	Sochaux	Paris
	M'Pelé 2' (pen.); Dahleb 41'	Report		Stadium: Parc des Princes; Attendance: 8,920; Referee: Alain Delmer

==== Quarter-finals ====
9 May 1975 First leg	Marseille	2–2	Paris Saint-Germain	Marseille
	Bereta 54'; Jairzinho 57'	Report	M'Pelé 59' (pen.), 71'	Stadium: Stade Vélodrome; Attendance: 26,595; Referee: Jean-Claude Martin

13 May 1975 Second leg	Paris Saint-Germain	2–0 (4–2 agg.)	Marseille	Paris
	Floch 24'; Laposte 86'	Report		Stadium: Parc des Princes; Attendance: 46,471; Referee: Georges Konrath

==== Semi-finals ====
7 June 1975 Single leg	Lens	3–2 (a.e.t.)	Paris Saint-Germain	Reims
	Faber 18' (pen.), 84'; Juraszek 100'	Report	M'Pelé 32'; Laposte 82'	Stadium: Stade Auguste-Delaune; Attendance: 23,249; Referee: René Vigliani

== Statistics ==
=== Appearances and goals ===
24 players featured in at least one official match, and the club scored 82 goals in official competitions, including three own goals.

Rank	Player	Position	Appearances	Goals	Source
1	(Republic of the Congo) François M'Pelé	FW	46	31	
2	(France) Jean-Pierre Dogliani	FW	45	5	
3	(France) Jacky Novi	DF	45	2	
4	(France) Denis Bauda	MF	45	0	
5	(Socialist Federal Republic of Yugoslavia) Ilija Pantelić	GK	43	0	
6	(France) Louis Cardiet	DF	42	0	
7	(France) Éric Renaut	DF	39	1	
8	(Italy) Albert Poli	MF	37	2	
9	(Algeria) Mustapha Dahleb	MF	33	19	
10	(France) Jacques Laposte	MF	31	2	
11	(France) Louis Floch	FW	28	7	
12	(France) Guy Nosibor	FW	23	5	
13	(France) Jacky Bade	DF	23	0	
14	(France) Jean Deloffre	MF	13	0	
15	(France) Dominique Lokoli	DF	11	0	
16	(France) Gérard Cenzato	DF	9	0	
17	(France) Michel Marella	FW	7	2	
18	(France) Bernard Dumot	MF	7	0	
19	(France) Christian André	FW	4	2	
20	(France) Jacky Planchard	GK	3	0	
21	(France) Robin Leclerc	MF	2	0	
22	(Togo) Othniel Dossevi	FW	1	1	
23	(France) Michel Bensoussan	GK	1	0	
24	(France) Christian Quéré	DF	1	0	
