= History of Paris Saint-Germain FC =

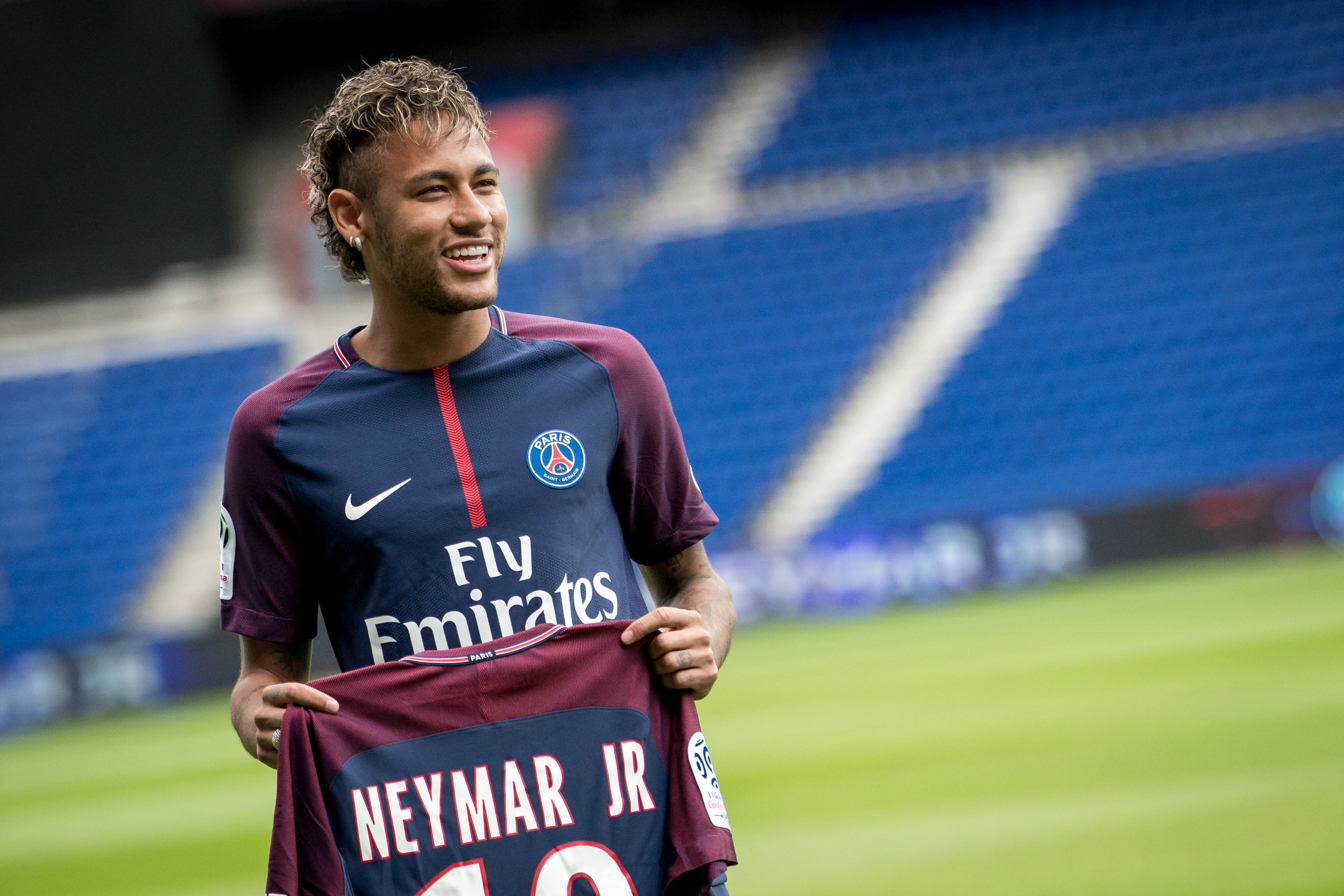
PSG regained prominence thanks to the Qatari takeover in 2011 and high-profile signings such as Neymar.

Paris Saint-Germain FC were founded in 1970 following the merger of Paris FC and Stade Saint-Germain. PSG made an immediate impact, winning Ligue 2 and thus achieving promotion to Ligue 1 in their first season. Their momentum was soon halted, and the club split in 1972. Paris FC remained in the top flight, while PSG had to continue in Division 3. After two consecutive promotions, PSG quickly returned to the top flight in 1974 and moved to the Parc des Princes.

The club's first trophies arrived in the 1980s. Led by players such as Safet Sušić, Luis Fernandez and Dominique Rocheteau, the Parisians claimed back-to-back Coupe de France in 1982 and 1983, and their first Ligue 1 title in 1986. A steep decline followed, but the takeover by Canal+ in 1991 revitalized PSG. Led by David Ginola, George Weah and Raí, the club won nine trophies and reached five consecutive European semi-finals during the 1990s. Notably, Paris captured their second league title in 1994 and the UEFA Cup Winners' Cup in 1996, with the legendary Luis Fernandez now as manager.

At the beginning of the 21st century, the Parisians were struggling to get back to the top despite the magic of Ronaldinho and the goals of Pauleta. Five more trophies followed: three Coupe de France, a Coupe de la Ligue and a UEFA Intertoto Cup, but PSG became better known for struggling through one crisis after another. Inevitably, Canal+ sold the club to Colony Capital in 2006. However, the situation only worsened, and PSG spent the next two seasons avoiding relegation.

The club's fortunes changed dramatically with the arrival of Qatar Sports Investments, operated by the government of Qatar, as owners in 2011. Since then, PSG have invested heavily in signings of world-class players such as Zlatan Ibrahimović, Lionel Messi, Neymar and Kylian Mbappé, the latter two being the most expensive transfers in football history. As a result, PSG have dominated French football, winning 38 trophies: twelve league titles, eight Coupe de France, six Coupe de la Ligue and twelve Trophée des Champions. They have also become a regular in the knockout stages of the UEFA Champions League, reaching the final for the first time in their history in 2020, winning their first title in 2025 as part of a continental treble, and retaining the title in 2026. PSG also claimed the 2025 UEFA Super Cup and the 2025 FIFA Intercontinental Cup, achieving an unprecedented sextuple.

== Early years (1970–1973) ==
=== Merger and split ===
By the late 1960s, Paris lacked a club competing in the top division of French football. In response, the French Football Federation (FFF) supported the creation of a major club based in the capital. Backed by a group of Parisian businessmen, including Guy Crescent and Pierre-Étienne Guyot, Paris FC was founded in 1969, initially without players, a stadium, or a place in the league system. Crescent and Guyot subsequently convinced Henri Patrelle, president of Stade Saint-Germain, a club from Saint-Germain-en-Laye located approximately 15 km west of Paris that had recently secured promotion to Division 2, to join the project. Paris Saint-Germain FC was formed on 17 June 1970 through the merger of the two clubs. On 26 June 1970, Guyot was elected the club's first president. Following approval by the general assemblies of both clubs earlier that year, the merger was officially validated by the Paris Police Prefecture on 12 August 1970, a date regarded by the club as its official foundation date. The registration was subsequently published in the Official Journal of the French Republic on 27 August 1970.

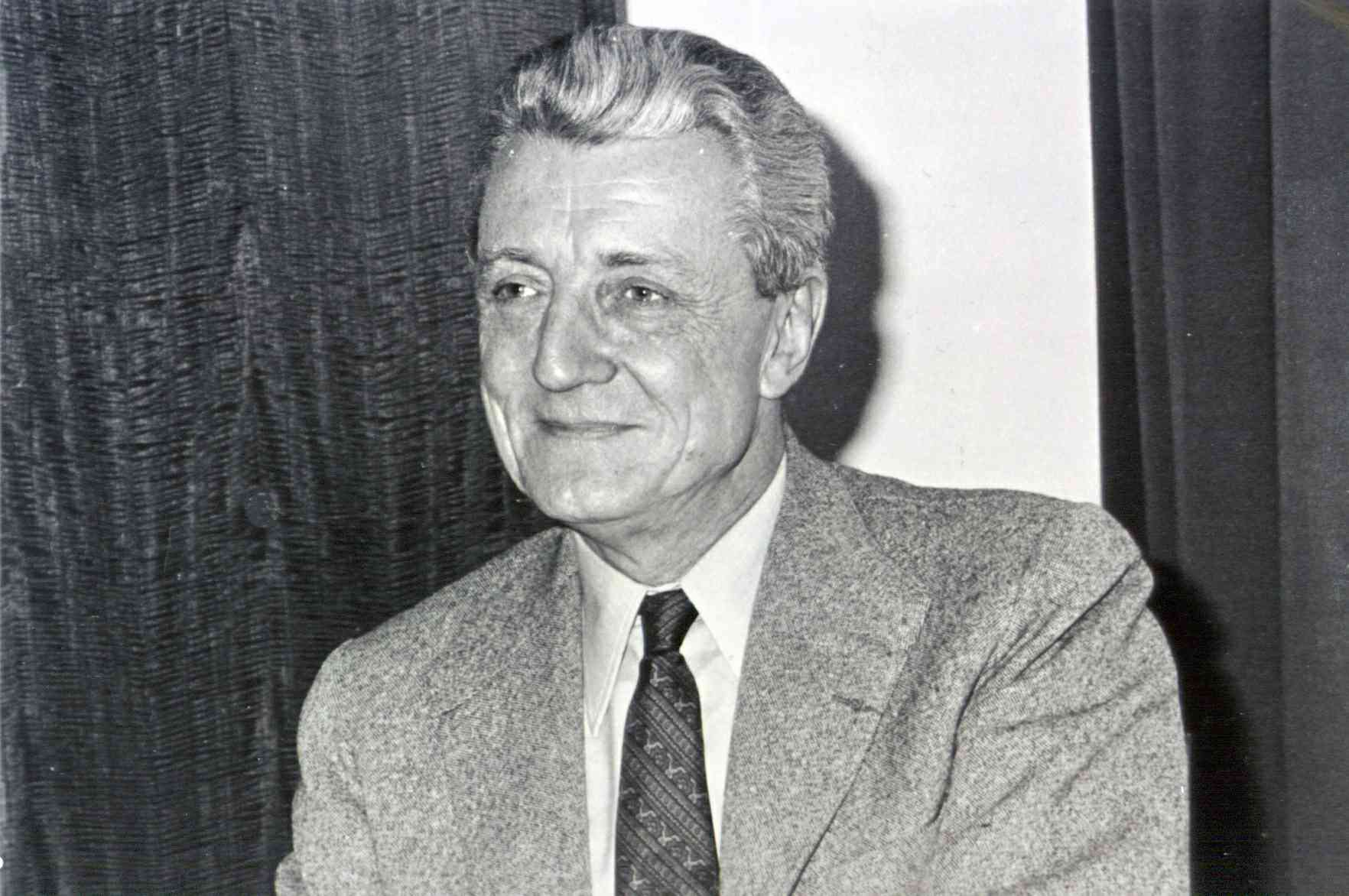
Guy Crescent, one of the founders of PSG.

Paris FC contributed financial backing, while Stade Saint-Germain provided the sporting infrastructure, including its place in Division 2, the Camp des Loges training centre, manager Pierre Phelipon, and most of the playing squad, notably Bernard Guignedoux, Michel Prost and Camille Choquier. PSG further strengthened the team with the signing of French national team captain Jean Djorkaeff. The club played its first official match on 23 August 1970, drawing 1–1 with Poitiers. Guignedoux scored PSG's first goal, converting a free kick. In its inaugural season, PSG won the Division 2 title and secured promotion to Division 1. During the same campaign, Guy Crescent succeeded Pierre-Étienne Guyot as club president.

In the summer of 1971, the Council of Paris threatened to withdraw its financial support unless the club adopted the name Paris FC and severed its ties with Saint-Germain-en-Laye. Vice-president Henri Patrelle opposed the proposal, while most former Paris FC directors supported it. In December 1971, Patrelle succeeded Guy Crescent as club president. Despite a successful debut Division 1 campaign, in which the club finished 16th and secured its top-flight status, he was unable to persuade the council to withdraw its ultimatum. A vote of the club's members subsequently failed to approve the proposed name change, resulting in a split on 20 June 1972. Guyot and Crescent joined Paris FC, which retained its place in Division 1, while PSG was reduced to its amateur section and administratively relegated to Division 3 under Patrelle's leadership.

Most of the first-team squad, including captain Jean Djorkaeff and Bernard Guignedoux, were under professional contracts and therefore remained with Paris FC, while manager Pierre Phelipon departed upon the expiration of his contract. Only Camille Choquier, Patrice Py, Jean-Louis Leonetti, Bernard Béréau and Jean-Louis Brost remained with PSG for the 1972–73 season. Under manager Robert Vicot, PSG secured immediate promotion to Division 2 with a young squad that included academy graduate Éric Renaut, Othniel Dossevi, Michel Marella, Jacques Laposte and Christian André, the main architect thanks to his 27 goals in 35 matches. PSG finished second in Group West, six points behind Quevilly, and initially missed out on promotion. However, after Quevilly announced that it would forgo promotion because of financial difficulties, PSG was awarded its place in Division 2 for the following season.

== Daniel Hechter years (1973–1978) ==
=== Return to the top flight ===
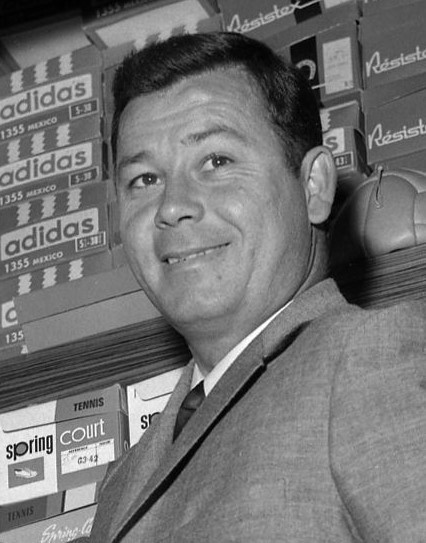
Just Fontaine helped PSG return to Division 1 in 1974.

During its first two years of existence, Paris Saint-Germain operated as a fan-owned club, using a membership system similar to that of major Spanish football clubs. This structure changed following the split with Paris FC in 1972. The PSG Association, which initially counted around 18,000 members, lost much of its influence, and the club soon encountered significant financial difficulties. Seeking new sources of funding, club president Henri Patrelle gradually ceded control to a group of wealthy French investors. Led by fashion designer Daniel Hechter, actor Jean-Paul Belmondo, and entrepreneur Francis Borelli, the consortium provided the financial resources necessary to stabilize the club after its promotion to Division 2 in 1973. Hechter also introduced PSG's new home kit, later known as the "Hechter shirt". With renewed financial backing, the club appointed former French international Just Fontaine as sporting director, although he effectively served as head coach, and recruited several experienced players, including Jean Deloffre, Louis Cardiet, Jacky Bade, and Jean-Pierre Dogliani, regarded as the club's first major star.

PSG played its first match at the Parc des Princes on 10 November 1973, defeating Red Star 3–1 during the 1973–74 season. Othniel Dossevi scored the club's first goal at the stadium. PSG also began its tradition of strong performances in the Coupe de France performances, reaching the quarter-finals, reaching the quarter-finals. In the league, the club finished second in Division 2 Group B, four points behind Red Star, thereby qualifying for the promotion play-offs against Valenciennes. After losing the first leg 2–1, PSG overturned the deficit with a 4–2 victory at the Parc des Princes on 4 June 1974, securing promotion to Division 1. Following the final whistle, Fontaine suffered a heart attack and collapsed on the pitch. He subsequently recovered and joined the promotion celebrations. Since that promotion, PSG has remained continuously in the top division of French football. Five days later, Hechter succeeded Patrelle as club president, having previously served as chairman of the management committee.

In a notable coincidence, Paris FC were relegated to Division 2 in 1974 just as PSG gained promotion to the top flight. As a result, PSG inherited the use of the Parc des Princes and has played its home matches there ever since. Ahead of the 1974–75 season, Hechter authorized a record transfer fee of approximately €205,000 for Algerian forward Mustapha Dahleb. Dahleb and François M'Pelé combined to score 50 goals during the campaign, but PSG struggled in the league and finished 15th.

PSG's Coupe de France campaign was the highlight of the season. The club defeated Sochaux 5–0 on aggregate in the round of 16 to set up a quarter-final tie against Olympique de Marseille. PSG fell two goals behind in the first leg at the Stade Vélodrome before François M'Pelé scored twice to keep the Parisians' qualification hopes alive. Following the match, Marseille supporters attacked the PSG team bus, an incident that M'Pelé later described as the origin of the rivalry between the two clubs. PSG won the return leg 2–0 and advanced to the semi-finals, becoming the first Parisian club since Stade Français in 1965 to reach that stage of the competition. Their campaign ended with a narrow defeat to Lens in the semi-finals.

=== Big signings, mid-table team ===
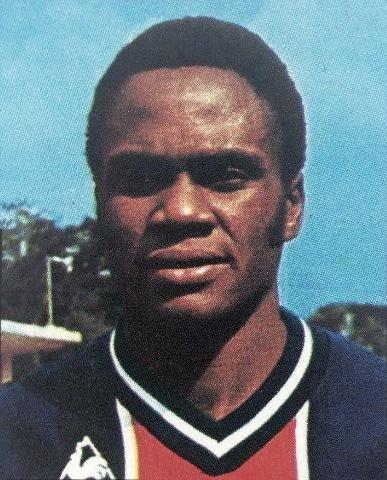
François M'Pelé, one of PSG's leading goalscorers during the 1970s.

Despite an ambitious recruitment campaign ahead of the 1975–76 season, which included the arrivals of Humberto Coelho and Jean-Pierre Tokoto, PSG finished 14th in Division 1. The season was also marked by tensions between manager Just Fontaine and captain Jean-Pierre Dogliani, culminating in Fontaine removing Dogliani from the captaincy after officially succeeding Robert Vicot as head coach earlier in the campaign. In the Coupe de France, PSG reached the quarter-finals for the third consecutive season. The club also took an important step in youth development with the opening of its first academy centre at the Camp des Loges in November 1975. Among the first players to emerge from the academy were Jean-Marc Pilorget and Thierry Morin, both of whom made their professional debuts against Stade de Reims in December 1975.

The 1976–77 season marked the beginning of a new era. Dogliani retired from professional football, while Velibor Vasović succeeded Fontaine as manager. The first foreign coach in PSG's history, Vasović arrived with the objective of securing qualification for European competition. Following a poor start to the season, PSG recovered but ultimately finished ninth in the league. Mustapha Dahleb scored 26 goals in all competitions, but the club nevertheless fell short of its European ambitions. Vasović resigned before the end of the campaign, and former PSG goalkeeper Ilija Pantelić oversaw the team's final four league matches.

Jean-Michel Larqué was appointed player-manager for the 1977–78 season. Although he had previously retired as a player, Larqué returned to the field after PSG failed to complete the transfer of Olympique Lyonnais playmaker Serge Chiesa. He became the second player-manager in the club's history after Pierre Phelipon and remains the last to have held the role. Despite the arrivals of several notable players, including defenders Jean-Pierre Adams and Ramón Heredia, PSG finished 11th in Division 1. Argentine striker Carlos Bianchi was the team's standout performer, finishing as the league's top scorer with 37 goals in 38 matches. He was also the final major signing made during Daniel Hechter's presidency.

In January 1978, the French Football Federation banned Hechter from football administration for his involvement in a ticketing scheme at the Parc des Princes. PSG defeated Marseille 5–1 in his final match as club president, after which Mustapha Dahleb presented him with the match ball and the players carried him from the field in celebration. The following day, vice-president Francis Borelli succeeded Hechter as president of the club.

== Francis Borelli years (1978–1991) ==
=== Climbing the league table ===
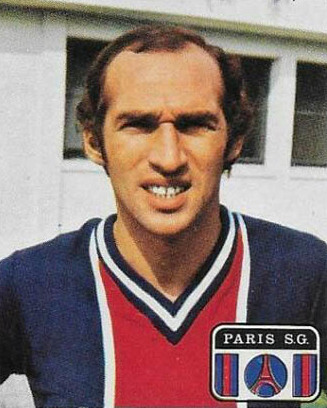
Carlos Bianchi, Division 1 top scorer in 1978 and 1979.

Despite a disappointing first season under Jean-Michel Larqué, PSG retained him as player-manager for the 1978–79 campaign. The club strengthened its squad with the signings of French internationals Dominique Baratelli and Dominique Bathenay in an effort to improve its league position. However, PSG again struggled, and Larqué resigned in August 1978 following a poor start to the season, choosing to concentrate on his playing career.

Pierre Alonzo succeeded Larqué on an interim basis but resigned unexpectedly in November 1978. Before Velibor Vasović could arrive to take charge, PSG travelled to face Monaco in a league match. On that occasion, club president Francis Borelli announced the starting lineup, making it the only official match in the club's history in which PSG played without a manager on the bench. The team lost 2–1. Carlos Bianchi finished as Division 1's top scorer for the second consecutive season, but PSG finished 13th and he subsequently joined reigning French champions Strasbourg. François M'Pelé also departed the club after scoring 97 goals in all competitions.

Vasović remained in charge for the 1979–80 campaign. PSG signed Portuguese playmaker João Alves, helping the club begin the season with a draw away to Lyon and a home victory against Marseille. Alves suffered a serious injury against Sochaux in August 1979 and was sidelined for five months. Although he returned in early 1980, he was unable to regain full fitness. In October 1979, Vasović resigned after it was determined that he did not possess the qualifications required to coach in France. Former PSG goalkeeper Camille Choquier served as caretaker manager until Georges Peyroche was appointed in November 1979. Under Peyroche, PSG finished seventh in Division 1, the highest league position in the club's history at the time.

Ahead of the 1980–81 season, PSG sold Alves to Benfica and signed Dominique Rocheteau from Saint-Étienne. Playing alongside Nambatingue Toko and Boubacar Sarr in attack, with Mustapha Dahleb operating as playmaker, Rocheteau contributed to PSG achieving its highest league finish to date. The club finished fifth in Division 1, narrowly missing qualification for European competition. In the Coupe de France, PSG recorded a 5–3 victory over Nantes at the Parc des Princes, but was eliminated on away goals.

=== First major trophy and European debut ===
Peyroche made several changes to the squad ahead of the 1981–82 season, signing Raymond Domenech, Michel N'Gom, Daniel Sanchez and Ivica Šurjak. PSG targeted qualification for European competition via Division 1 but finished seventh. The club also reached the 1982 Coupe de France final against Saint-Étienne, led on the pitch by Michel Platini. Nambatingue Toko opened the scoring in the second half from a Šurjak cross. Platini equalized later in the match before scoring again in extra time to give Saint-Étienne the lead. Rocheteau, assisted by Šurjak, scored an equalizer in the closing seconds to level the match.

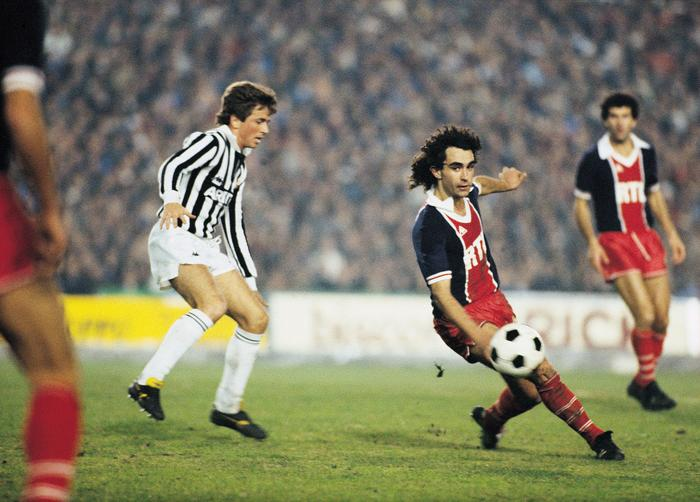
Dominique Rocheteau scored the late equalizing goal in the 1982 Coupe de France final.

Supporters invaded the pitch following the equalizer, while club president Francis Borelli knelt and kissed the pitch at the Parc des Princes. After a 30-minute interruption, the match was decided by a penalty shoot-out, in which PSG won its first major trophy. Dominique Baratelli saved Saint-Étienne's final penalty, and Jean-Marc Pilorget scored the winning penalty. The victory secured PSG's qualification for the 1982–83 European Cup Winners' Cup. PSG became the first Parisian club to compete in European competition since the 1960s, when Racing Paris and Stade Français participated in the Inter-Cities Fairs Cup.

Ahead of the 1982–83 European campaign, PSG strengthened its squad with the signings of Kees Kist, Osvaldo Ardiles and Safet Sušić, who was later regarded as one of the club's most significant players. They joined an established squad including Bathenay, Rocheteau, Dahleb and Toko, as well as younger players such as Luis Fernandez, Jean-Claude Lemoult and Pilorget.

PSG made its European debut against Lokomotiv Sofia in the first round. After losing 1–0 in Bulgaria, PSG won the return leg 5–1 at the Parc des Princes, with Toko scoring the decisive goal. The club then eliminated Swansea City to reach the quarter-finals, where 49,575 spectators attended the home leg against Waterschei. PSG won the first leg 2–0, with Luis Fernandez scoring the opening goal, but lost the return leg 3–0 after extra time and were eliminated from the competition.

In domestic competition, PSG finished third in Division 1, its highest league placing to that point, and won its second Coupe de France title by defeating Nantes in the 1983 Coupe de France final. Pascal Zaremba opened the scoring for PSG, before Nantes equalized and later took the lead at half-time. In the second half, PSG reversed the scoreline, with Safet Sušić equalizing and assisting Nambatingue Toko for the winning goal, giving PSG a 3–2 victory. Peyroche left the club at the end of the season to take a sabbatical.

=== Rise to the Division 1 title ===
PSG qualified for the Cup Winners' Cup after successfully defending the Coupe de France title. Their first-round opponents were Glentoran, whom they defeated 4–2 on aggregate to set up a tie against Juventus, led by Michel Platini. PSG drew both legs but were eliminated on the away goals rule by the eventual champions. In the second leg in Turin, PSG came close to progressing, with a Safet Sušić free kick hitting the post and Jean-Marc Pilorget missing a clear chance in the closing minutes.

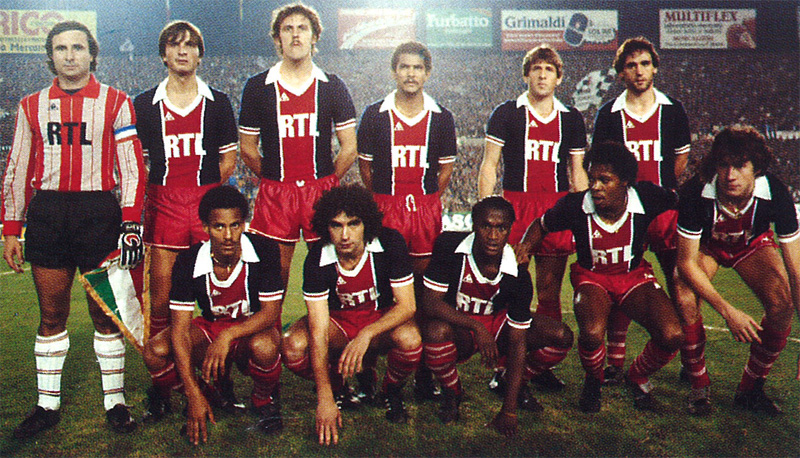
PSG players during a 1983 match against Juventus.

PSG struggled to maintain domestic form under Lucien Leduc in the 1983–84 season. The club was eliminated early from the Coupe de France, and a poor run of results late in the season led to Leduc's resignation. He was replaced by Georges Peyroche, who returned after a ten-month absence. PSG finished the season strongly, defeating Toulouse on the final matchday, with Sušić scoring the only goal to secure fourth place and qualification for the UEFA Cup.

The club endured a difficult 1984–85 season following the departure of Mustapha Dahleb, who had spent ten years at PSG. Peyroche was dismissed in March 1985 due to poor results, and his replacement, Christian Coste, was unable to improve performances. PSG finished 13th in Division 1. The club did, however, reach the 1985 Coupe de France final for the third time in four years, where it lost to Monaco. PSG were also eliminated in the second round of the UEFA Cup by Videoton, losing both legs, including a 4–2 defeat at the Parc des Princes. A notable individual performance came from Sušić, who recorded five assists in a 7–1 victory over Bastia in September 1984, a club record that still stands.

PSG won their first French championship in the 1985–86 season under Gérard Houllier, who had replaced Coste. The team went on a 26-match unbeaten run en route to the title. The squad was built around players such as Rocheteau, Sušić, Luis Fernandez (the new captain), Pilorget and Joël Bats. PSG became the first Parisian club to win the league since Racing Paris in the 1935–36 season. The club also narrowly missed out on a league and cup double, losing in the Coupe de France semi-finals to Bordeaux.

=== Decline and financial crisis ===
Fernandez, Jean-Claude Lemoult and Thierry Morin left ahead of the 1986–87 season, and PSG attempted to reinforce its attack. Gérard Houllier signed strikers Vahid Halilhodžić, Daniel Xuereb and Jules Bocandé, who joined Dominique Rocheteau in a highly attacking but unbalanced squad. The team finished seventh in Division 1, was eliminated early in the Coupe de France, and was knocked out in the first round of the European Cup by Vítkovice.

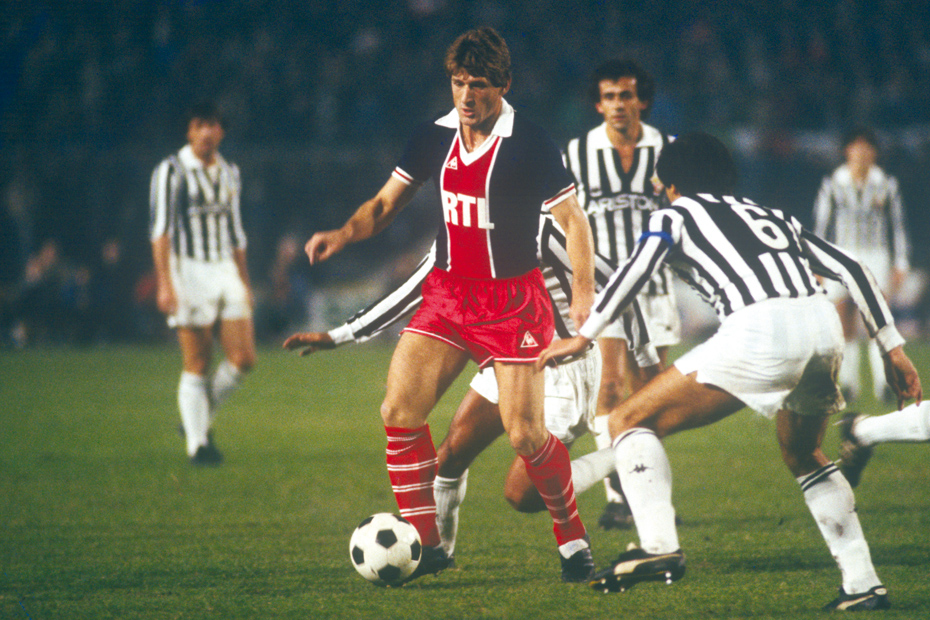
Safet Sušić playing for PSG against Juventus in 1983.

PSG's championship-winning side declined further in the 1987–88 season following Rocheteau's departure. Midfielders Gabriel Calderón and Ray Wilkins were signed, but were unable to stabilise performances. Wilkins made ten appearances before joining Rangers in December 1987. Following a run of seven defeats in eight matches, Houllier stepped down from coaching duties and became sporting director in October 1987.

Erick Mombaerts was appointed manager, but results did not improve and PSG spent part of the season in the relegation zone. Houllier returned as manager in February 1988 for the remainder of the campaign. The club avoided relegation on the final day of the season, with Daniel Xuereb scoring the only goal in a 1–0 win away to Le Havre, securing a 15th-place finish. Houllier left the club at the end of the season.

PSG briefly recovered under Tomislav Ivić in the 1988–89 season. Matches against Marseille grew in significance as both clubs competed for the title, with tensions increasing between the clubs' leadership. In May 1989, the teams met in a decisive match at the Stade Vélodrome. With the score level at 0–0 in the closing stages, Marseille secured the title through a late goal from Franck Sauzée, giving them a 1–0 victory.

PSG finished fifth in the 1989–90 season and reached the second round of the UEFA Cup, where it was eliminated by Juventus on aggregate. Daniel Bravo joined the club during the season, while Jean-Marc Pilorget departed after 14 years and a club-record 435 appearances. Results declined further in the 1990–91 season, with PSG finishing ninth in Division 1. The club’s financial situation deteriorated under Borelli's leadership, with increasing debt and instability. In April 1991, supporters called for Borelli's resignation amid the risk of bankruptcy. In May 1991, following the end of the season and under pressure from the Council of Paris, Borelli transferred control of the club to the media group Canal+.

== Canal+ years (1991–2006) ==
=== Rivalry with Marseille ===
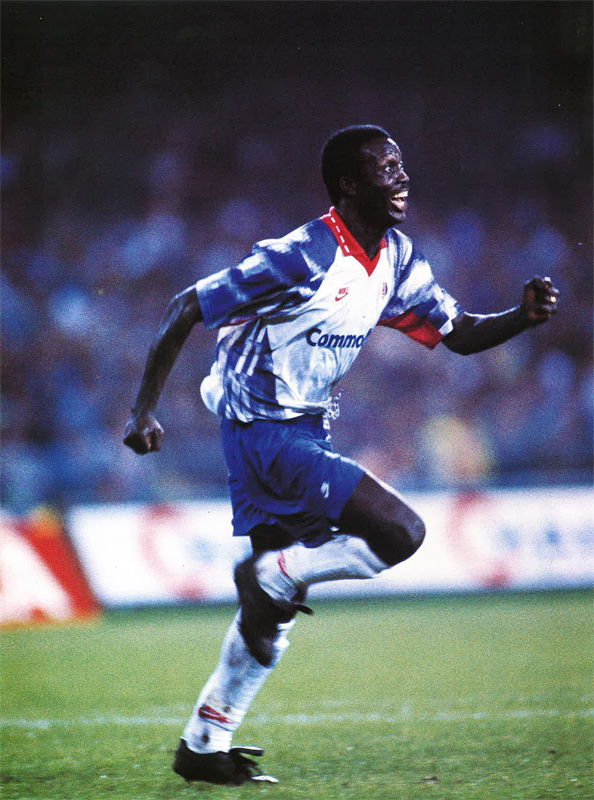
George Weah celebrating a goal for PSG against Napoli in 1992.

Until June 1991, the Association Paris Saint-Germain Football Club, a nonprofit organization under the law of 1901, managed the club's amateur and professional activities. When Canal+ took control of PSG in May 1991, it created a sport private limited company, the Société Anonyme Sportive Professionnelle Paris Saint-Germain Football (SASP), a few days later, holding 40% of the shares, while the association retained 51%. The professional section was transferred to the SASP. The takeover by Canal+ revitalized the club and made it one of the richest in France.

The Council of Paris facilitated the transition by paying off the club's €1.4 million debt, while Canal+ appointed Michel Denisot, a journalist for the channel, as club president, replacing Francis Borelli, who resigned. With increased investment, PSG aimed to qualify for European competition immediately and to win the French championship within three years. The rebuilding process included the departure of eleven players, including Jocelyn Angloma, Michel Bibard, Philippe Jeannol and Safet Sušić.

Canal+ allocated a budget of 120 million francs for the 1991–92 season and appointed Artur Jorge, who had previously led Porto to the 1987 European Cup, as manager. PSG strengthened its squad with the signings of Brazilian internationals Ricardo and Valdo, French players Paul Le Guen, Laurent Fournier, Bernard Pardo, Bruno Germain and Patrick Colleter, and young winger David Ginola. Despite criticism of Jorge's pragmatic style, PSG finished third in Division 1, securing qualification for the UEFA Cup. Goalkeeper Joël Bats retired at the end of the season.

Led by Bernard Lama in goal, along with Alain Roche, Vincent Guérin and striker George Weah, PSG reached the semi-finals of the Cup Winners' Cup in the 1992–93 season, the first European semi-final in the club's history. They progressed through ties against PAOK, Napoli and Anderlecht before facing Real Madrid. After losing 3–1 in the first leg at the Santiago Bernabéu Stadium, PSG won the return leg 4–1 at the Parc des Princes with goals from Weah, Ginola, Valdo and Antoine Kombouaré, advancing on aggregate. The run ended in the semi-finals against Juventus, who won 3–1 on aggregate after a hat-trick from Roberto Baggio, despite a goal from Weah in the first leg.

Domestically, PSG defeated Nantes in the 1993 Coupe de France final to win their third title in the competition without conceding a goal. The victory came almost exactly ten years after their 1983 success, also against Nantes, and marked the club's first trophy since 1986 as well as its first under Canal+ ownership. The season also marked the emergence of the rivalry with Marseille, known as Le Classique, as both clubs competed for the league title. PSG finished second, before Marseille were later found guilty of match-fixing and stripped of their title by the French Football Federation.

=== League and European champions ===
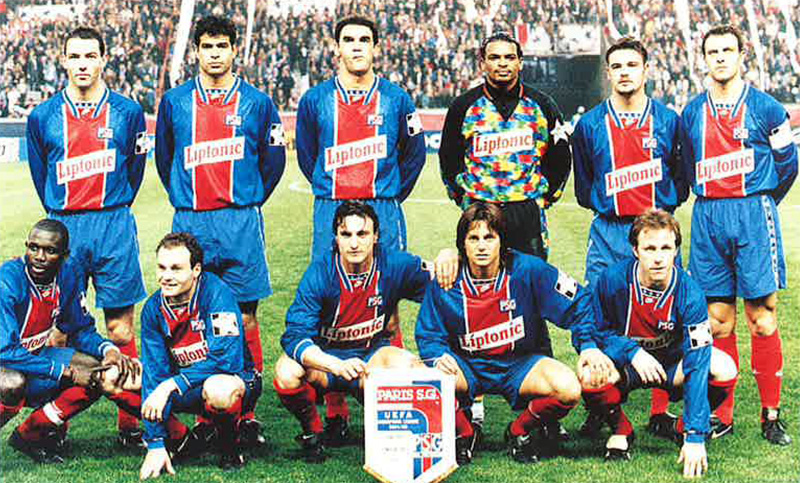
PSG team against AC Milan in 1995.

Brazilian playmaker Raí, widely regarded as one of the club's greatest players, joined PSG ahead of the 1993–94 season and helped the team to its second league title. The club went on a 27-match unbeaten run, surpassing its own Division 1 record set in 1986. A header from Ricardo after Valdo whipped in a corner secured a 1–0 victory over Toulouse in April 1994 that confirmed the title. At full-time, the Parc des Princes pitch was invaded for a brief, orderly celebration. In the Coupe de France, PSG recorded its largest victory to date, a 10–0 win over amateur side Côte Chaude in the round of 64, before being eliminated by Lens in the quarter-finals.

In Europe, PSG again came close to a final in the Cup Winners' Cup. The club eliminated Real Madrid in the quarter-finals, becoming the first French team to win at the Santiago Bernabéu, with a goal from George Weah securing the result. However, PSG were eliminated in the semi-finals by Arsenal. After a 1–1 draw in the first leg in Paris, PSG lost 1–0 in London; Weah was left out of the matchday squad for the return leg. Artur Jorge was subsequently replaced by Luis Fernandez.

Despite finishing third in Division 1, the 1994–95 season was successful for PSG. The club won both the Coupe de France and the inaugural Coupe de la Ligue, and reached the semi-finals of the UEFA Champions League. PSG won all six of its group stage matches in a group containing Bayern Munich, Spartak Moscow and Dynamo Kyiv, becoming one of the few clubs to achieve this record. The team then eliminated Barcelona in the quarter-finals before being defeated by AC Milan, who progressed 3–0 on aggregate.

Key players including Weah, Ricardo, Valdo and Ginola left before the 1995–96 season. They were replaced by Patrice Loko, Julio Dely Valdés, Youri Djorkaeff and Bruno Ngotty. PSG’s domestic form was inconsistent, with early exits in both cup competitions and a loss of the league title to Auxerre following a 3–0 defeat at the Parc des Princes in March 1996. The only domestic trophy was the 1995 Trophée des Champions, won on penalties against Nantes.

In contrast, PSG won the 1995–96 UEFA Cup Winners' Cup. After victories over Molde and Celtic, the club defeated Parma and Deportivo de La Coruña to reach the final against Rapid Wien. Djorkaeff played a central creative role, and PSG took the lead in the first half when Bruno Ngotty scored from long range following a short free-kick routine. PSG held on to win 1–0, becoming the second French club to win a major European trophy after Marseille in 1993, and the first French winner of the Cup Winners' Cup.

=== Domestic cup successes ===
With Ricardo replacing Fernandez as manager for the 1996–97 season, Cup Winners' Cup holders PSG faced Champions League winners Juventus in the two-legged 1996 UEFA Super Cup. The Bianconeri proved too strong, winning 9–2 on aggregate, including a 6–1 victory at the Parc des Princes. PSG responded by defeating Galatasaray, AEK Athens and Liverpool to reach the 1997 UEFA Cup Winners' Cup final four months later, where they faced Barcelona. Ronaldo was fouled by Ngotty in the penalty area and converted the resulting spot-kick, as PSG became the eighth team to lose a second consecutive final in the competition. Despite a squad overhaul that saw Leonardo replace Bravo and Djorkaeff depart, PSG finished runners-up in the league, securing Champions League qualification, but suffered early cup exits, including a defeat to fourth-tier Clermont in the Coupe de France. At the end of the season, Canal+ increased its stake in the SASP to 57%, becoming the majority shareholder.

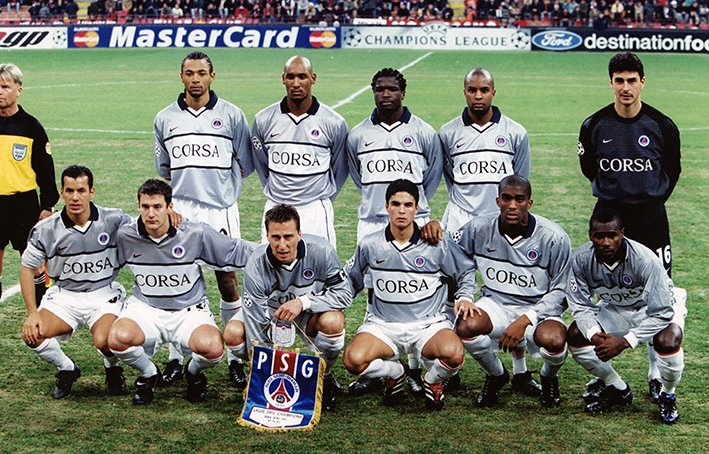
PSG against AC Milan in the UEFA Champions League in 2001.

PSG opened the 1997–98 season against Steaua București in the Champions League qualifiers. UEFA awarded a 3–0 forfeit defeat after PSG fielded suspended player Fournier in the first leg. However, Leonardo provided four assists in a 5–0 win in the return leg at the Parc des Princes in his final appearance for the club. PSG were ultimately eliminated in the group stage on goal difference. A disappointing eighth-place finish in the league was offset by a second domestic cup double, matching the achievement of 1995. In his final match at the Parc des Princes in April 1998, captain Raí received a standing ovation and left the pitch in tears after a farewell lap of honour.

Charles Biétry replaced Denisot as president for the 1998–99 season, appointing Alain Giresse as manager and overseeing a major squad overhaul. Raí, Guérin, Le Guen, Llacer and Fournier all left the club. In return, PSG signed Nigerian star Jay-Jay Okocha and several promising young French players, including Laurent Leroy and Yann Lachuer. The latter scored the only goal in PSG's 1998 Trophée des Champions victory over Lens, but results soon declined. A first-round exit in the Cup Winners' Cup and a poor start to the league led to Giresse's dismissal, with Artur Jorge appointed in November 1998. A month later, Biétry was replaced by Laurent Perpère. The team failed to recover, and after elimination from both domestic cups, Jorge was replaced by Philippe Bergeroo in March. He ultimately secured survival with a ninth-place finish.

In his first full season in charge, Bergeroo led PSG to second place in the league, securing Champions League qualification. However, the club failed to build on a promising 1999–2000 season, suffering an early exit from the Coupe de France and losing to second-division Gueugnon in the 2000 Coupe de la Ligue final. Two PSG veterans departed at the end of the season: Lama was given a standing ovation in his final appearance at the Parc des Princes, while Fournier was honoured in a testimonial match at the stadium later that month.

=== UEFA Intertoto Cup winners ===
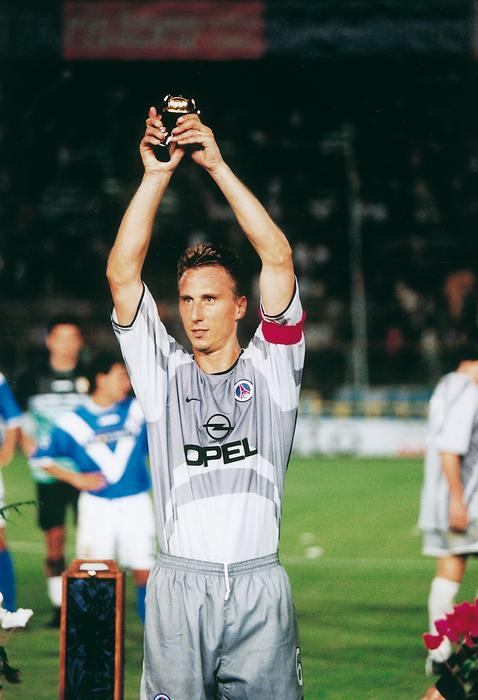
PSG captain Frédéric Déhu lifting the UEFA Intertoto Cup trophy.

In the summer of 2000, Canal+ launched the "PSG Banlieue" project. The signings of young French talents Nicolas Anelka, Peter Luccin and Stéphane Dalmat, along with experienced defender Frédéric Déhu, were intended to strengthen PSG's challenge for the 2000–01 season. The team made a strong start, led by Laurent Robert and Anelka, but declined in form during the winter period. Following a 5–1 defeat to Sedan in December, the club dismissed Philippe Bergeroo. Luis Fernandez returned as manager and reshaped the squad with the arrivals of Mauricio Pochettino, Mikel Arteta and Didier Domi. PSG finished ninth in the league, exited both domestic cup competitions early, and only secured qualification for the UEFA Intertoto Cup due to withdrawals by several Spanish clubs. In Europe, the team recorded a notable 7–2 victory over Rosenborg in the UEFA Champions League group stage, but failed to advance following a late collapse against Deportivo La Coruña.

Canal+ subsequently increased its investment in the club ahead of the 2001–02 season, signing Aloísio, Gabriel Heinze, Hugo Leal and Cristóbal Parralo, and raising its ownership stake to 90%. PSG won the 2001 UEFA Intertoto Cup, defeating Brescia in the two-legged final tie. The first leg in Paris ended in a goalless draw. The return leg in Italy was closely contested. Aloísio scored for PSG before Roberto Baggio equalized from the penalty spot in the closing stages, but PSG won on away goals. Ronaldinho joined PSG shortly thereafter, strengthening the squad. The club finished fourth in Ligue 1, securing UEFA Cup qualification but missing its primary objective of Champions League qualification. It also suffered a penalty shootout defeat to Rangers in the UEFA Cup and early exits from both domestic cup competitions.

Despite a strong start in the 2002–03 season, internal difficulties undermined the team’s consistency. Fernandez frequently left Ronaldinho out of the starting line-up, citing concerns about his focus and lifestyle. PSG finished 11th in Ligue 1, their lowest position in 15 years, and were eliminated early from both the Coupe de la Ligue and the UEFA Cup. The defeat to Auxerre in the 2003 Coupe de France final capped a disappointing campaign. Hugo Leal scored for PSG but was later sent off, as Auxerre came from behind to win the match, denying Ronaldinho a trophy in Paris. A positive note was PSG's three victories over arch-rivals Marseille, including an away win at the Stade Vélodrome, their first there in nearly 20 years.

Francis Graille and Vahid Halilhodžić were appointed president and manager respectively, with the aim of stabilising the club both sportingly and financially. Ronaldinho’s departure to Barcelona allowed for a major squad rebuild. PSG signed Juan Pablo Sorín, winger Fabrice Fiorèse, and striker Pauleta, who scored 18 goals, alongside Danijel Ljuboja in attack. The 2003–04 season was the club's most successful in six years, as PSG won their sixth Coupe de France title against Châteauroux in the final and finished second in Ligue 1, three points behind Lyon. The only setback was elimination by Gueugnon in the Coupe de la Ligue.

=== Cup victory against Marseille ===
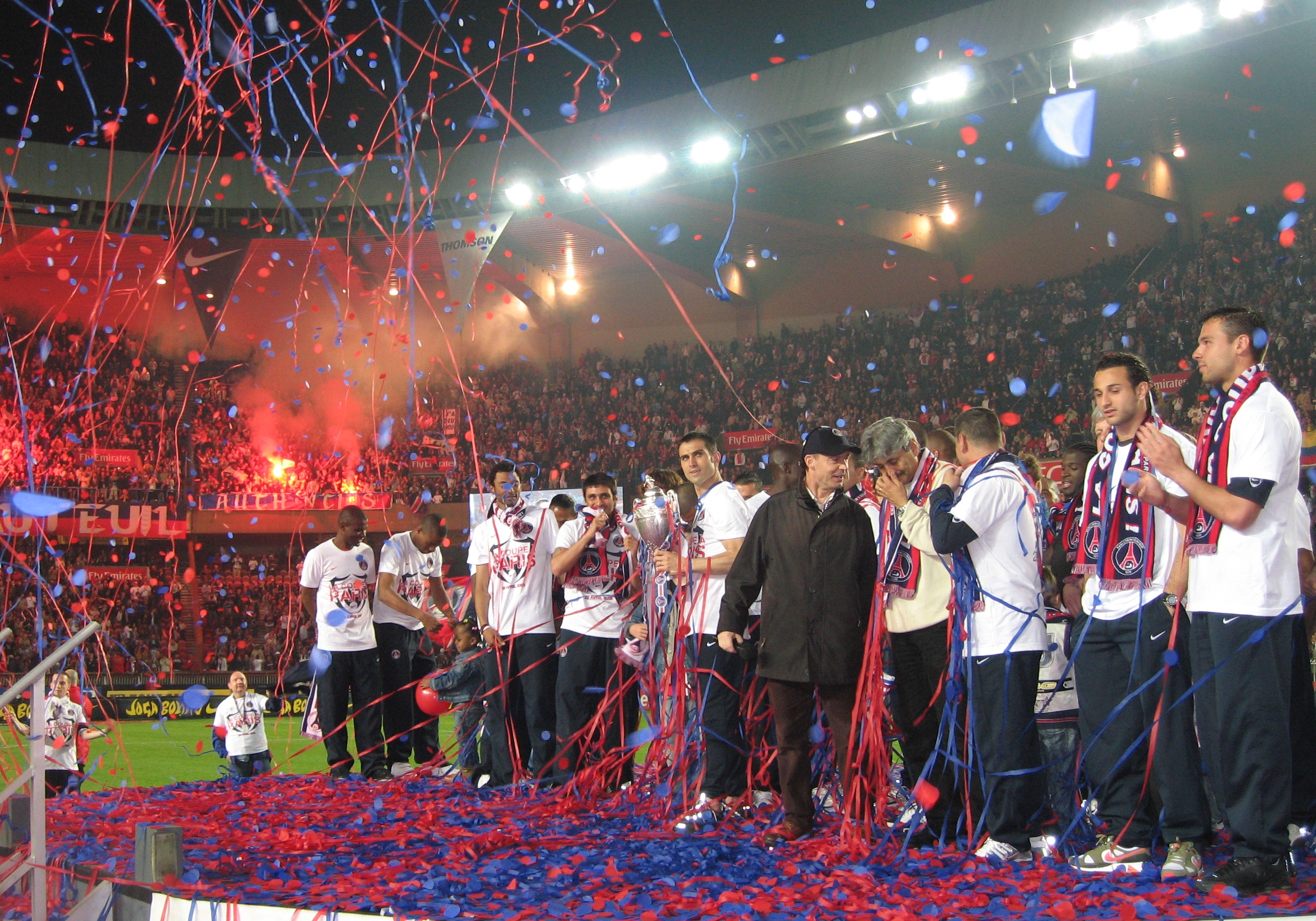
PSG celebrate their 2–1 victory over Marseille in the 2006 Coupe de France final.

The departures of key players such as Déhu, Heinze, Sorín and Fiorèse left a significant void in the squad for the 2004–05 season. PSG lost the 2004 Trophée des Champions to Lyon on penalties and soon found themselves in the relegation zone. Weakened by internal conflict between the players and Halilhodžić, he left his position in February 2005 and was replaced by former PSG midfielder Laurent Fournier.

A notable result was a 2–0 victory over reigning European champions Porto. It was the club's only win in the Champions League group stage, as PSG finished bottom of their group. Domestically, the club recorded its seventh and eighth consecutive victories against Marseille but was eliminated early from all other competitions. PSG ultimately finished ninth in Ligue 1. Following this disappointing season, president Francis Graille was dismissed and replaced by Pierre Blayau.

At the start of the 2005–06 season, Canal+ acquired the remaining shares of the club and set the objective of finishing in the top three of Ligue 1. PSG briefly led the table after Matchday 4 and remained in the upper positions until November 2005. However, a series of poor results, particularly away from home, led to a significant decline in form during the winter period. During the mid-season break, president Pierre Blayau appointed Guy Lacombe as manager.

Despite elimination from the Coupe de la Ligue and a ninth-place league finish, Lacombe guided PSG to a 2–1 victory over arch-rivals Marseille in the 2006 Coupe de France final. This secured the club's seventh Coupe de France title, surpassing Saint-Étienne's total of six, and qualification for the UEFA Cup. In April 2006, after several years of underperformance, Canal+ sold the club to a consortium consisting of Colony Capital, Butler Capital Partners and Morgan Stanley. Alain Cayzac, a long-time PSG supporter and former club executive (and minority shareholder between 1991 and 2005), was appointed president shortly thereafter.

== Colony Capital years (2006–2011) ==
=== Relegation battles ===
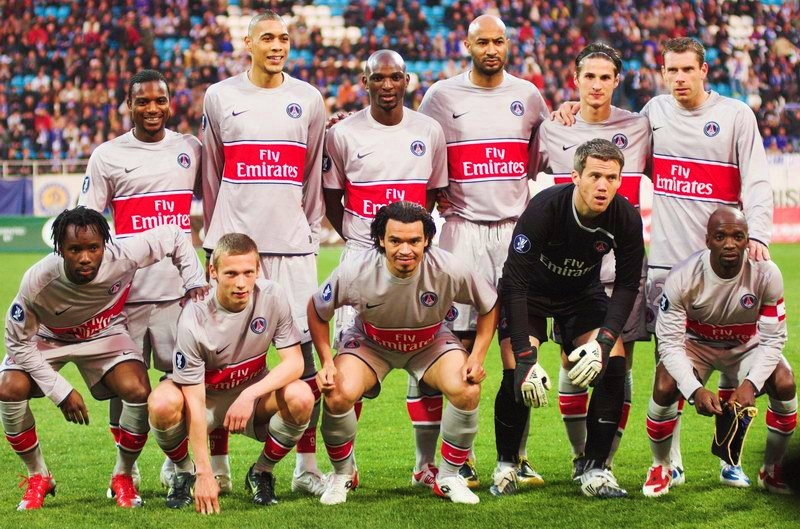
PSG away to Dynamo Kyiv in 2009.

PSG endured a difficult 2006–07 season. After losing the 2006 Trophée des Champions to Lyon on penalties and being eliminated from the Coupe de la Ligue by the same opponents, Guy Lacombe was replaced by Paul Le Guen in January 2007. Despite the arrivals of Jérémy Clément, Marcelo Gallardo and Péguy Luyindula, PSG struggled, exiting both the Coupe de France and UEFA Cup while briefly dropping into the relegation zone. The club ultimately secured survival with a six-match unbeaten run and finished 15th in Ligue 1. Pauleta scored 15 league goals and finished as Ligue 1's top scorer for the second consecutive season.

PSG again battled relegation in the 2007–08 season, securing survival on the final day after Amara Diané scored twice in a 2–1 win over Sochaux. The club finished 16th, its lowest league position since 1972. Despite its league struggles, PSG reached the 2008 Coupe de France final, losing to Lyon, and won the 2008 Coupe de la Ligue final against Lens to claim its first title in the competition since 1998 and qualify for the UEFA Cup. At the end of the season, Pauleta retired as the club's all-time leading scorer, surpassing Dominique Rocheteau. President Alain Cayzac resigned and was temporarily replaced by Simon Tahar, while Colony Capital became majority shareholder after increasing its stake to 62.5%.

Ahead of the 2008–09 season, PSG strengthened its squad with the signings of Claude Makélélé, Ludovic Giuly, Guillaume Hoarau, and Stéphane Sessègnon. The club reached the Coupe de la Ligue semi-finals, the UEFA Cup quarter-finals—its best European run since 1997—and remained in the Ligue 1 title race for much of the season before finishing sixth. During the campaign, a governance dispute led to the resignation of president Charles Villeneuve, who was replaced on an interim basis by Sébastien Bazin. At the end of the season, Colony Capital acquired Morgan Stanley's shares and became the club's near-exclusive shareholder.

Robin Leproux was appointed president and Antoine Kombouaré replaced Paul Le Guen as manager ahead of the 2009–10 season. New signings included Grégory Coupet, Mevlüt Erdinç and Christophe Jallet. Despite a promising start, PSG finished 13th in Ligue 1. The club nevertheless secured qualification for the UEFA Europa League by winning the 2010 Coupe de France final, defeating Monaco thanks to an extra-time goal from Guillaume Hoarau.

Following the arrivals of Nenê, Mathieu Bodmer and Siaka Tiéné, PSG finished fourth in Ligue 1 in 2010–11, its highest league position since 2003–04. The club also reached the 2011 Coupe de France final, where it lost to Lille, and advanced to the UEFA Europa League round of 16 after topping a group featuring Sevilla and Borussia Dortmund. In June 2011, Qatar Sports Investments (QSI), backed by the Qatari government, acquired a 70% stake in PSG, marking the beginning of a new era for the club.

== Qatar Sports Investments years (2011–Present) ==
=== Third league title ===
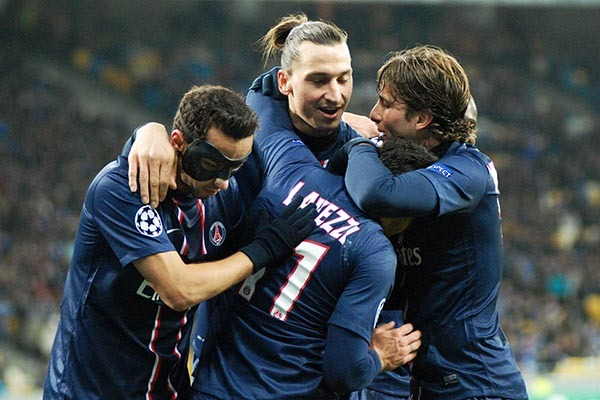
PSG won their first Ligue 1 title in 19 years in 2013.

The takeover by QSI transformed PSG into one of the wealthiest clubs in world football. Club president Nasser Al-Khelaifi outlined ambitions to establish PSG as the leading club in France and a contender for the UEFA Champions League. Former player Leonardo returned as sporting director ahead of the 2011–12 season and oversaw a major recruitment drive, bringing in Blaise Matuidi, Kevin Gameiro, Jérémy Ménez, Salvatore Sirigu and Javier Pastore.

PSG made a strong start to the season and topped the league in October 2011 after six consecutive victories. The run ended with a home defeat to Nancy, followed by a 3–0 loss to Marseille at the Stade Vélodrome. The club was also eliminated from the Coupe de la Ligue by Dijon and failed to progress from the UEFA Europa League group stage. PSG nevertheless regained first place before the winter break. During the January transfer window, Carlo Ancelotti replaced Kombouaré as manager, while Maxwell, Alex and Thiago Motta joined the squad. QSI also acquired the remaining shares held by Colony Capital and Butler Capital Partners, becoming the club's sole owner.

Ancelotti began his tenure with five consecutive victories, but PSG ultimately finished second in Ligue 1, three points behind champions Montpellier. The club was also eliminated by Lyon in the quarter-finals of the Coupe de France. Despite missing out on the league title, PSG qualified for the UEFA Champions League for the first time since 2004.

PSG continued to invest heavily ahead of the 2012–13 season, signing Zlatan Ibrahimović, Thiago Silva, Ezequiel Lavezzi and Marco Verratti. After a slow start, the club moved to the top of the table in October 2012 and regained first place before the winter break after briefly surrendering it in November. Despite eliminations from the Coupe de la Ligue and Coupe de France, PSG secured its third French league title and first since 1994. Jérémy Ménez scored the only goal in a 1–0 victory away to Lyon in May 2013, confirming the championship with two matches remaining. PSG also reached the quarter-finals of the UEFA Champions League after progressing past Porto, Dynamo Kyiv and Valencia, but were eliminated by Barcelona on away goals after drawing both legs. David Beckham, who joined the club in January 2013, retired at the end of the season.

=== Domestic quadruples ===
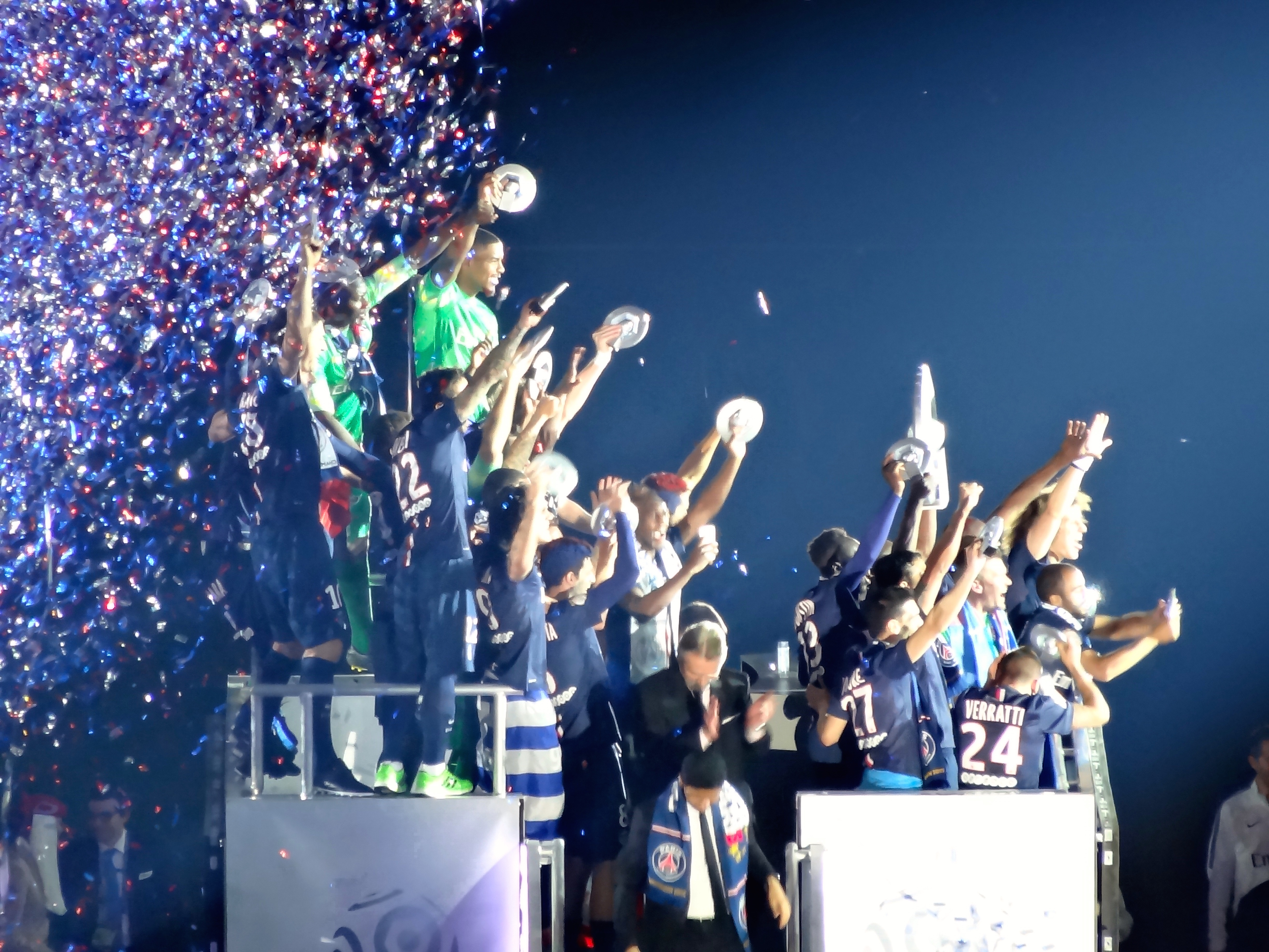
PSG players lift the Ligue 1 trophy in 2015.

PSG continued its investment ahead of the 2013–14 season with the signings of Edinson Cavani and Marquinhos. Despite Carlo Ancelotti's departure, the club maintained its success under Laurent Blanc, winning the 2013 Trophée des Champions against Bordeaux, its first French Super Cup since 1998. Cavani and Zlatan Ibrahimović combined for 42 league goals as PSG secured a league and league cup double, winning its fourth Ligue 1 title and defeating Lyon in the 2014 Coupe de la Ligue final. The club was eliminated by Montpellier in the Coupe de France and reached the UEFA Champions League quarter-finals, where it defeated Olympiacos, Anderlecht, Benfica and Bayer Leverkusen before losing to Chelsea on away goals after a 3–3 aggregate draw.

Ahead of the 2014–15 season, David Luiz was the club's only major signing, while academy graduate Kingsley Coman departed on a free transfer. PSG opened the campaign by winning the 2014 Trophée des Champions against Guingamp. After a slow start in Ligue 1, the club recovered to retain the league title and win the 2015 Coupe de la Ligue final and 2015 Coupe de France final, completing the first domestic quadruple in French football history. In the Champions League, PSG eliminated Chelsea on away goals in the round of 16 despite playing much of the second leg with ten men, but was eliminated by eventual champions Barcelona in the quarter-finals.

PSG added Ángel Di María to their star-studded squad in the 2015–16 season. In Ligue 1, he provided 18 assists, while Ibrahimović and Cavani scored 57 goals together, helping Paris to their sixth title with a record 96 points, 31 more than second-place Lyon. PSG also lifted another domestic quadruple with victories in the 2015 Trophée des Champions against Lyon, the 2016 Coupe de la Ligue final against Lille and the 2016 Coupe de France final against Marseille. The latter marked a record tenth consecutive victory against their arch-rivals. It was also Zlatan's final game for Paris; he left as the club's top scorer with 156 goals, having surpassed Pauleta's 109 during the campaign. A fourth consecutive Champions League quarter-final exit, this time to Manchester City, was the final straw for Al-Khelaifi, who publicly dismissed the season as a failure and parted ways with Blanc despite a trophy-laden spell.

=== Continental heartbreak ===
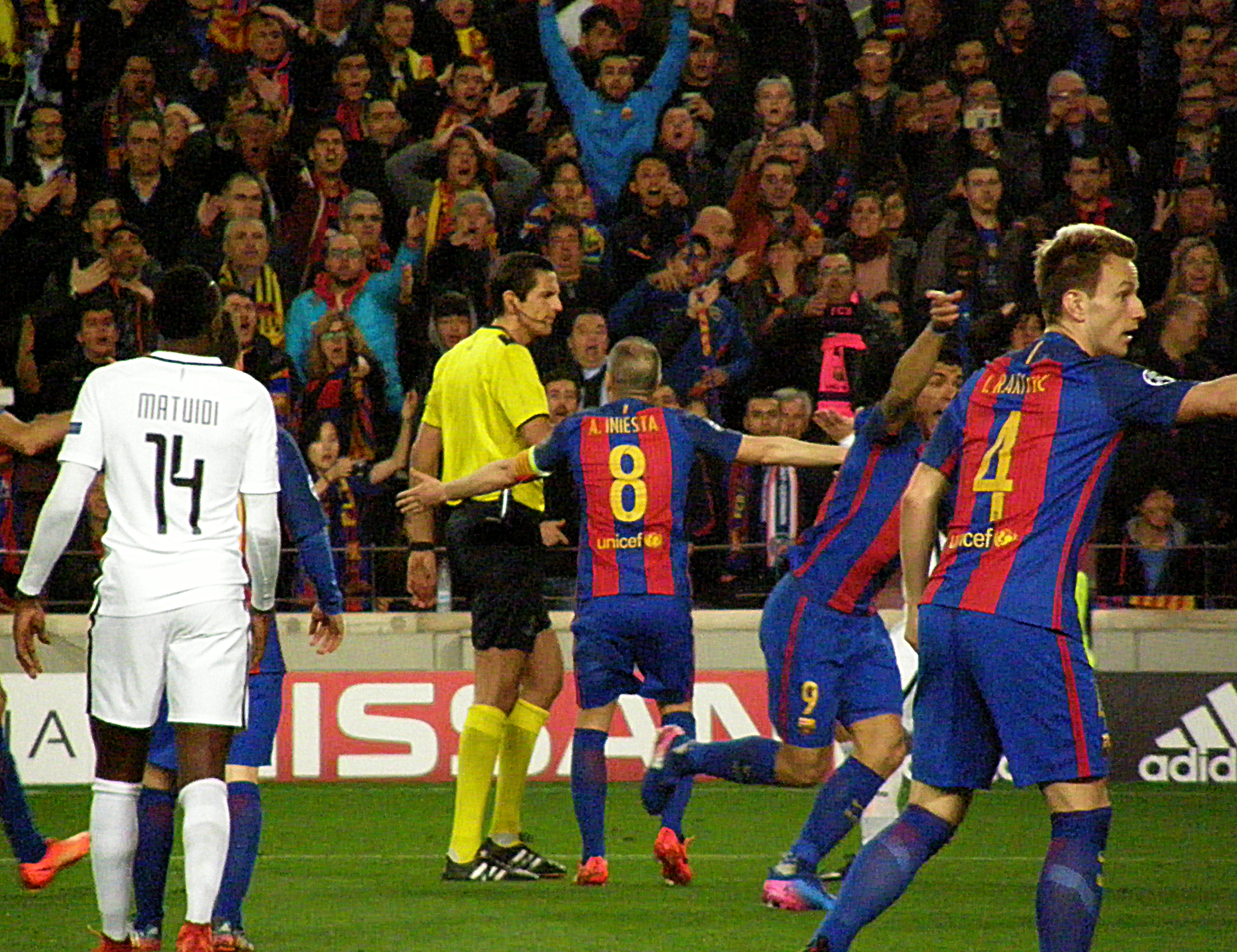
PSG and Barcelona during La Remontada.

Fresh from three consecutive Europa League titles, Unai Emery was appointed PSG manager ahead of the 2016–17 season. The club won the 2016 Trophée des Champions with a 4–1 victory over Lyon, but saw its four-year Ligue 1 title streak ended by a Monaco side led by Radamel Falcao, Bernardo Silva and Kylian Mbappé charged to the league title and ended PSG's four-year streak. PSG responded by winning the 2017 Coupe de la Ligue final, beating Monaco 4–1, and the 2017 Coupe de France final, and produced one of the finest European performances in its history with a 4–0 victory over Barcelona in the Champions League round of 16. However, the club suffered a 6–1 defeat in the return leg at the Camp Nou, becoming the victim of the competition's most famous comeback, known as La Remontada.

Following that elimination, PSG signed Neymar for a world-record €222 million fee and secured Mbappé for €180 million ahead of the 2017–18 season. The club regained the Ligue 1 title and completed its third domestic quadruple, defeating Monaco in both the 2017 Trophée des Champions and the 2018 Coupe de la Ligue final, before winning the 2018 Coupe de France final against third-tier Les Herbiers. PSG's Champions League campaign again ended in the round of 16, however, as eventual winners Real Madrid overturned an early Paris lead to progress and effectively bring Emery's tenure to a close.

PSG appointed Thomas Tuchel as manager for the 2018–19 season. The club won its eighth Ligue 1 title and the 2018 Trophée des Champions, defeating Monaco 4–0, but suffered another Champions League collapse, surrendering a first-leg advantage to Manchester United and exiting on away goals in the round of 16. Domestic cup campaigns were also disappointing, with PSG losing the 2019 Coupe de France final to Rennes on penalties and being eliminated from the Coupe de la Ligue by Guingamp.

Led by Neymar and goalkeeper Keylor Navas, PSG completed its fourth domestic quadruple in the 2019–20 season. After Ligue 1 was suspended due to the COVID-19 pandemic, the Ligue de Football Professionnel (LFP) awarded Paris the title based on a points-per-game ratio. PSG also won the 2019 Trophée des Champions, the 2020 Coupe de France final, and the 2020 Coupe de la Ligue final. The club then reached the 2020 UEFA Champions League final for the first time in its history, defeating Borussia Dortmund, Atalanta and RB Leipzig along the way. In the final, however, former PSG academy player Kingsley Coman scored the only goal as Bayern Munich defeated Paris 1–0.

=== End of the superstar era ===
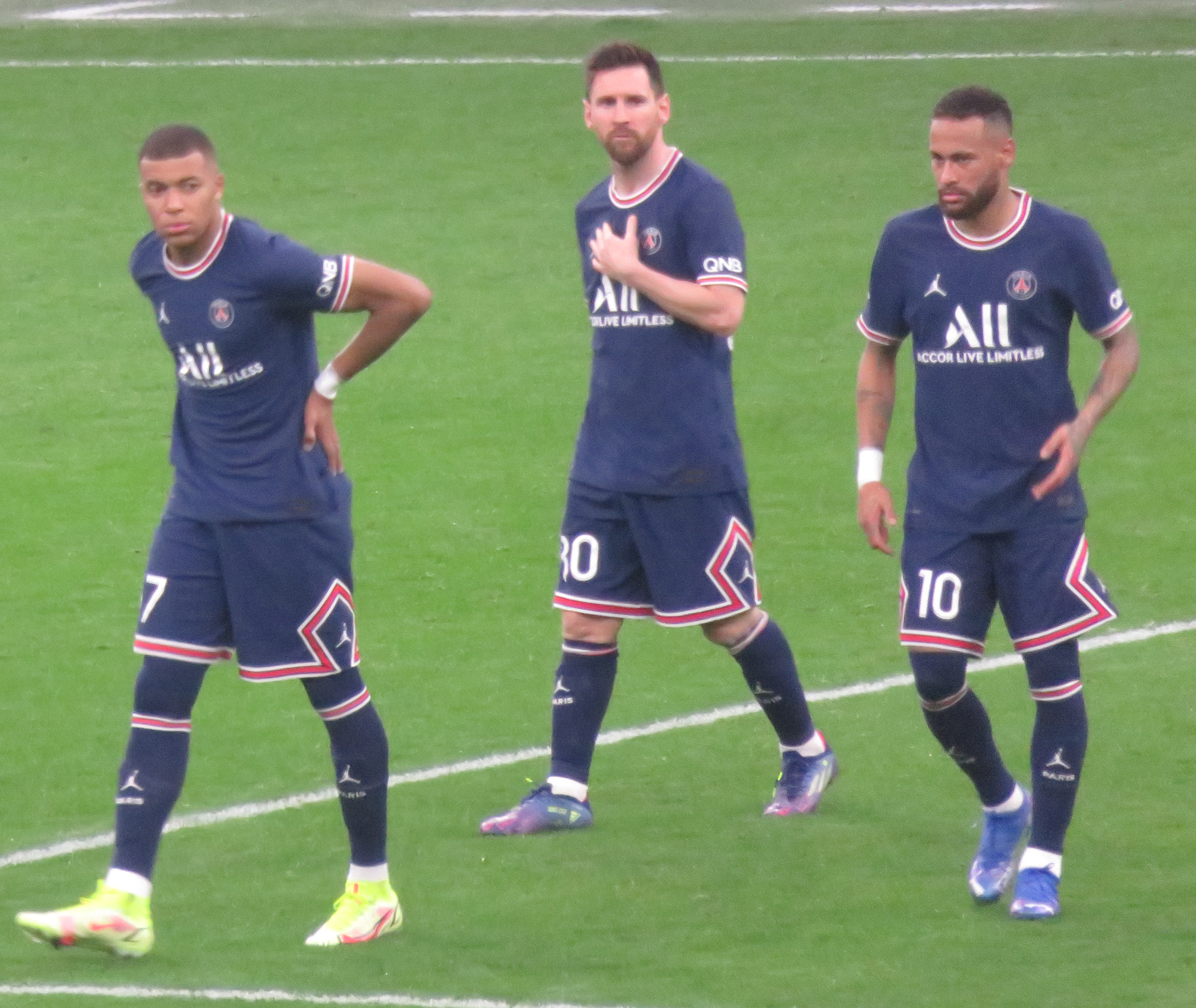
PSG failed to win the Champions League with Neymar, Kylian Mbappé and Lionel Messi.

Despite recently guiding PSG to a European final, Thomas Tuchel was sacked in December 2020 after a mixed start to the 2020–21 season, which included four league defeats and two in the Champions League group stage. His replacement, Mauricio Pochettino, initially improved results, including wins over Marseille in the 2020 Trophée des Champions and against Barcelona and Bayern Munich in the Champions League knockout stages. However, PSG were eliminated by Manchester City in the semi-finals and lost the Ligue 1 title to Lille, with their season ending in victory in the 2021 Coupe de France final against Monaco.

The club's 2021 summer transfer window included the signings of Achraf Hakimi, Nuno Mendes and Gianluigi Donnarumma, alongside free transfers of Lionel Messi and Sergio Ramos. Despite this, PSG won only the Ligue 1 title in the 2021–22 season, losing the 2021 Trophée des Champions to Lille, exiting the Coupe de France early, and suffering another Champions League round-of-16 elimination to Real Madrid despite leading 2–0 in the second leg before conceding three goals in 17 minutes.

In the 2022–23 season, sporting director Luís Campos continued squad restructuring with the arrivals of Vitinha and Fabián Ruiz, while academy graduate Warren Zaïre-Emery established himself in the first team. Under manager Christophe Galtier, PSG retained the Ligue 1 title and won the 2022 Trophée des Champions, but were eliminated by Marseille in the Coupe de France round of 16. Mbappé, Neymar and Messi scored 58 goals, but PSG again fell short in the UEFA Champions League, being eliminated by Bayern Munich.

Ahead of the 2023–24 season, PSG moved towards a younger squad following the departures of Messi, Neymar, Verratti and Ramos. The club signed Ousmane Dembélé and Bradley Barcola, and appointed Luis Enrique as manager. PSG won Ligue 1, the 2023 Trophée des Champions and the 2024 Coupe de France final, and reached the UEFA Champions League semi-finals. In the quarter-finals, PSG produced a comeback victory over Barcelona to advance. They then faced Borussia Dortmund in the semi-finals, dominating large portions of the tie but failing to score across both legs, ultimately losing 2–0 on aggregate after hitting the woodwork six times.

=== UCL title and sextuple ===
With Mbappé's departure to Real Madrid, Luis Enrique was finally free to implement his philosophy in the 2024–25 season, signing young talents Désiré Doué, João Neves, Willian Pacho and Khvicha Kvaratskhelia. Early results were not promising, especially in the Champions League, with losses to Arsenal, Atlético Madrid and Bayern Munich in the league phase. Everything hinged on their game against Manchester City. Trailing 2–0 in the 53rd minute, PSG rose to the occasion, scoring four times to win and advance to the knockout phase.

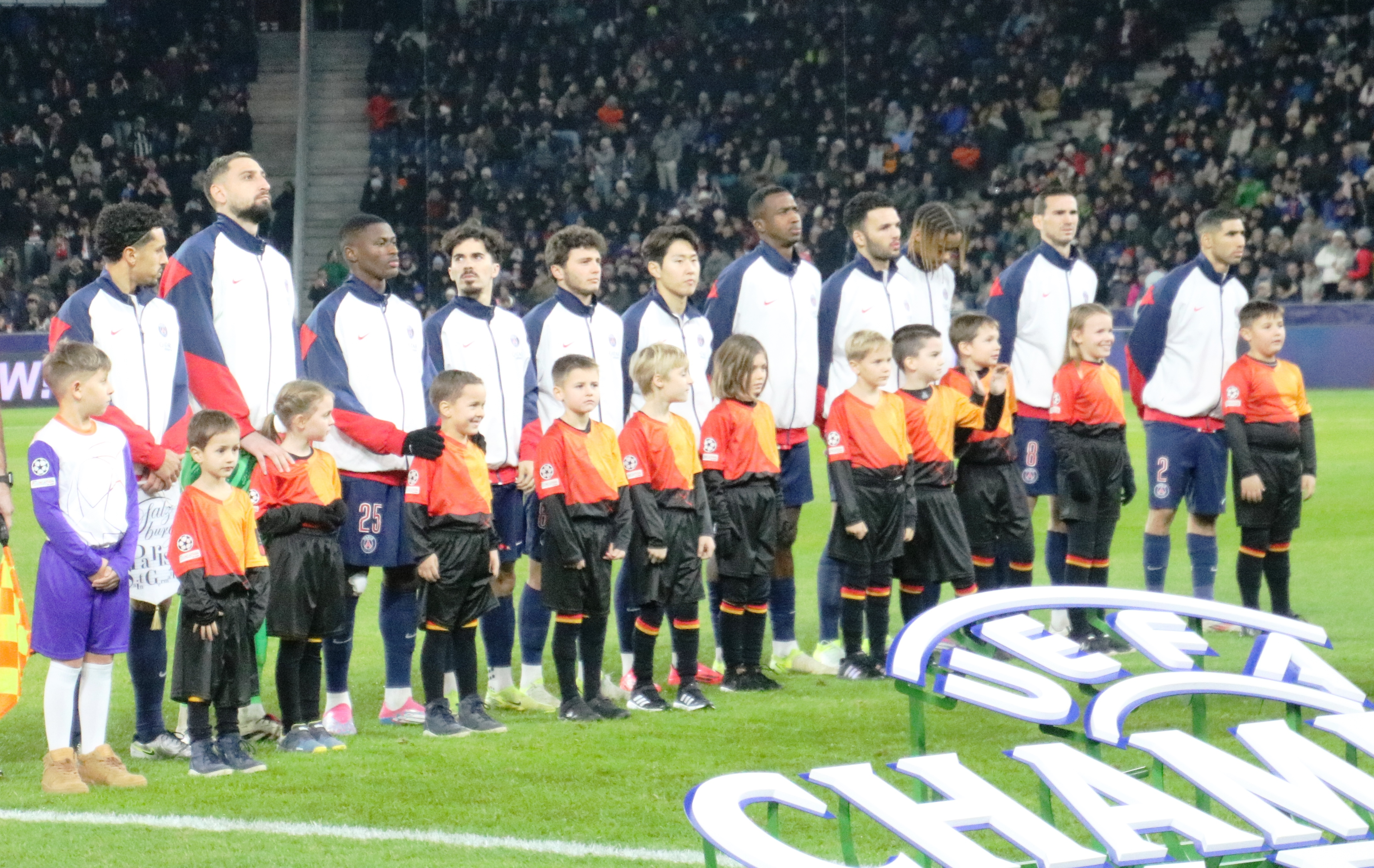
PSG during their UCL title-winning campaign in 2025.

Luis Enrique's men then took off, winning the 2024 Trophée des Champions against Monaco, the Ligue 1 title and the 2025 Coupe de France final against Reims. Led by Dembélé, Doué and Donnarumma in goal, the Parisians eliminated Liverpool, Aston Villa and Arsenal to reach the final at the Allianz Arena in Munich, where they defeated Inter Milan by a record 5–0 scoreline to complete the continental treble and become the first team to win a European Cup final by more than four goals.

The club qualified for the 2025 FIFA Club World Cup due to their UEFA rankings from 2021 to 2024. Apart from their 1–0 defeat against reigning Copa Libertadores holders Botafogo, PSG were unplayable throughout the tournament, delivering three 4–0 thrashings to Atlético Madrid, Messi's Inter Miami and Real Madrid. However, in the final, they looked a shadow of themselves and were left in the dust by Cole Palmer's Chelsea first-half onslaught, losing 3–0.

PSG bounced back in the 2025 UEFA Super Cup at the Stadio Friuli in Udine, becoming the first French side to win this competition. A late comeback saw the Champions League holders overturn a 2–0 deficit in the final ten minutes to equalize, with goals from substitutes Lee Kang-in and Gonçalo Ramos, and eventually beat Europa League winners Tottenham Hotspur 4–3 on penalties. Dembélé, who provided the assist for the equalizer, was named Man of the Match.

As Champions League winners, PSG qualified directly for the final of the 2025 FIFA Intercontinental Cup against the 2025 Copa Libertadores champions Flamengo at the Ahmad bin Ali Stadium in Qatar. Khvicha Kvaratskhelia opened the scoring for PSG, before Flamengo equalized through a Jorginho penalty. After a goalless extra time, the match was decided on penalties, with Russian goalkeeper Matvey Safonov emerging as the hero by saving four spot-kicks. PSG became the first French club to win the trophy, claimed the first club world title in French football history, and completed an unprecedented sextuple, a feat previously achieved only by Barcelona in 2009 and Bayern Munich in 2020.

=== Back to back UCL titles ===
PSG began the season by winning the 2025 Trophée des Champions. Ousmane Dembélé opened the scoring with a lobbed finish, but Marseille overturned the deficit through a Mason Greenwood penalty and a Willian Pacho own goal. Gonçalo Ramos equalised in stoppage time, and goalkeeper Lucas Chevalier saved two spot-kicks as PSG prevailed in the ensuing penalty shoot-out. In the Coupe de France, however, PSG suffered their first elimination at the round of 32 since 2014. Former PSG Youth Academy graduate Jonathan Ikoné scored the decisive goal in Paris FC's 1–0 Paris derby victory at the Parc des Princes. Nevertheless, PSG secured a record-extending 14th French league title and their fifth consecutive championship, the first such sequence in the club's history. The title was confirmed following a 2–0 away victory over Lens, their nearest challengers, with one match remaining in the season.

Luis Enrique's side also retained the UCL title despite an inconsistent league phase and a difficult play-off tie against Monaco. From the round of 16 onwards, PSG produced a series of strong performances, with Khvicha Kvaratskhelia and Ousmane Dembélé playing key roles. The club defeated Chelsea and Liverpool by a combined aggregate score of 12–2 before overcoming Bayern Munich in the semi-finals, a tie decided by a 5–4 victory at the Parc des Princes. PSG faced Arsenal in the final at the Puskás Aréna in Budapest. Arsenal took an early lead, but Dembélé equalised from a penalty won by Kvaratskhelia. In the resulting penalty shoot-out, Arsenal missed their final attempt, allowing PSG to become the first club since Real Madrid in 2018 to successfully defend their title and the ninth overall to do so. PSG also equalled Barcelona's 1999–2000 record of 45 goals scored in a single UCL campaign.

PSG became only the third team to win consecutive titles after defeating Aston Villa 2–1 in the 2026 UEFA Super Cup. Goals from Khvicha Kvaratskhelia and Désiré Doué secured the victory for the European champions. PSG were unable to follow this with another trophy, as Lens won the 2026 Trophée des Champions for the first time in its history with a 1–0 victory. Florian Thauvin scored the only goal of the match, while Lens dominated despite playing with ten men for most of the game.
