= 1972–73 Paris Saint-Germain FC season =

3rd season of Paris Saint-Germain FC

Paris Saint-Germain
1972–73 season
- President: Henri Patrelle
- Manager: Robert Vicot
- Stadium: Stade Georges Lefèvre
- Division 3: 2nd (promoted)
- Coupe de France: Round of 64
- Top goalscorer: League: Christian André (21); All: Christian André (27)
- Average home league attendance: 679
Home colours	Away colours	Third colours

The 1972–73 season was the 3rd season in the history of Paris Saint-Germain FC. PSG played their home league matches at the Stade Georges Lefèvre, attracting an average of 679 spectators per match. The club's president was Henri Patrelle, and the team was managed by Robert Vicot, with Camille Choquier serving as captain. PSG finished second in Division 3 and were promoted to Ligue 2 after Quevilly declined promotion shortly after the season ended. The club also reached the round of 64 in the Coupe de France. Christian André was the team's top scorer, netting 27 goals in all competitions, including 21 in the league.

== Players ==
=== Squad ===
Players who featured in at least one official match for the club.

Note: Flags indicate national team as defined under FIFA eligibility rules; some limited exceptions apply. Players may hold more than one non-FIFA nationality.

No.	Pos.	Nation	Player
—	GK	FRA	Camille Choquier (captain)
—	GK	FRA	Patrice Py
—	DF	FRA	Pascal Schmitt
—	DF	FRA	Bernard Béréau
—	DF	FRA	Éric Renaut
—	DF	FRA	Patrice Zbinden
—	DF	FRA	Claude Rivet
—	DF	FRA	Patrice Turpin
—	DF	FRA	Didier Ledunois
—	DF	FRA	Bernard Lambert
—	DF	FRA	Christian Quéré

No.	Pos.	Nation	Player
—	DF	FRA	Michel Béhier
—	MF	FRA	Bernard Dumot
—	MF	FRA	Jacques Laposte
—	MF	FRA	Thierry Coutard
—	MF	FRA	Robin Leclerc
—	FW	TOG	Othniel Dossevi
—	FW	FRA	Christian André
—	FW	FRA	Jean-Louis Brost
—	FW	FRA	Michel Marella
—	FW	FRA	Richard Vanquelles
—	FW	TUN	Kamel Ben Mustapha

== Transfers ==
=== Arrivals ===
Players who signed for the club.

Note: Flags indicate national team as defined under FIFA eligibility rules; some limited exceptions apply. Players may hold more than one non-FIFA nationality.

No.	Pos.	Nation	Player
—	DF	FRA	Pascal Schmitt (from Sedan)
—	DF	FRA	Didier Ledunois (from RC Paris)
—	DF	FRA	Christian Quéré (from Fontainebleau)
—	DF	FRA	Éric Renaut (from PSG Youth Academy)
—	DF	FRA	Patrice Zbinden (from PSG Youth Academy)
—	DF	FRA	Claude Rivet (from PSG Youth Academy)
—	DF	FRA	Patrice Turpin (from PSG Youth Academy)
—	DF	FRA	Bernard Lambert (from PSG Youth Academy)
—	MF	FRA	Bernard Dumot (from Châteauroux)

No.	Pos.	Nation	Player
—	MF	FRA	Michel Llodra (from PSG Youth Academy)
—	MF	FRA	Thierry Coutard (from PSG Youth Academy)
—	MF	FRA	Robin Leclerc (from PSG Youth Academy)
—	MF	FRA	Jacques Laposte (from La Gauloise de Trinité)
—	FW	TOG	Othniel Dossevi (from Ambert)
—	FW	FRA	Christian André (from Samaritaine)
—	FW	FRA	Michel Marella (from AS Banque de France)
—	FW	FRA	Richard Vanquelles (from PSG Youth Academy)

=== Departures ===
Players who left the club.

Note: Flags indicate national team as defined under FIFA eligibility rules; some limited exceptions apply. Players may hold more than one non-FIFA nationality.

No.	Pos.	Nation	Player
—	GK	FRA	Guy Delhumeau (to Paris FC)
—	DF	FRA	Claude Arribas (to Nantes, end of loan)
—	DF	FRA	Jean Djorkaeff (to Paris FC)
—	DF	FRA	Daniel Guicci (to Paris FC)
—	DF	FRA	Roland Mitoraj (to Bordeaux)
—	DF	FRA	Jean-Paul Rostagni (to Paris FC)
—	DF	FRA	Daniel Solas (to Paris FC)
—	DF	FRA	Daniel Zorzetto (to Paris FC)
—	MF	FRA	Jean-Louis Leonetti (to Paris FC)

No.	Pos.	Nation	Player
—	MF	FRA	Sylvain Léandri (to Paris FC)
—	MF	FRA	Jean-Pierre Destrumelle (to Valenciennes)
—	MF	FRA	Bernard Guignedoux (to Paris FC)
—	MF	FRA	Gérard Hallet (to Paris FC)
—	FW	ENG	Jantzen Derrick (to Bath City)
—	FW	FRA	Jean-Claude Bras (to Paris FC)
—	FW	FRA	Daniel Horlaville (to Paris FC)
—	FW	FRA	Michel Prost (to Paris FC)
—	FW	FRA	Jacques Rémond (to Avignon)

== Kits ==
Montreal was the shirt sponsor, and Le Coq Sportif was the kit supplier.

Home	Away	Third

== Competitions ==
=== Overview ===
Competition	First match	Last match	Starting round	Final position	Record							
Competition	First match	Last match	Starting round	Final position	Pld	W	D	L	GF	GA	GD	Win %
Division 3	27 August 1972	27 May 1973	Matchday 1	2nd	30	17	8	5	67	27	+40	56.67
Coupe de France	26 November 1972	28 January 1973	Fifth round	Round of 64	5	3	1	1	13	7	+6	60.00
Total					35	20	9	6	80	34	+46	57.14

Source: Competitions

=== Division 3 ===
==== League table (Group West) ====
Pos	Team	Pld	W	D	L	GF	GA	GD	Pts	Promotion or relegation
1	Quevilly (C)	30	21	6	3	57	12	+45	48	Dissolved due to financial problems
2	Paris Saint-Germain (P)	30	17	8	5	67	27	+40	42	Promotion to Ligue 2
3	Évreux	30	15	9	6	39	20	+19	39	
4	Rennes B	30	16	4	10	40	29	+11	36	
5	Quimper	30	15	6	9	49	32	+17	36	

Source: Histoire du PSG
(C) Champions; (P) Promoted

==== Results by round ====
Round	1	2	3	4	5	6	7	8	9	10	11	12	13	14	15	16	17	18	19	20	21	22	23	24	25	26	27	28	29	30
Ground	H	H	A	H	A	H	A	H	A	H	A	H	A	H	A	H	A	H	A	H	A	H	A	H	A	H	A	H	A	A
Result	W	W	W	D	L	W	W	W	D	W	L	W	W	W	D	W	D	L	W	D	D	D	W	W	L	D	W	W	L	W
Position	3	1	1	2	2	2	2	2	2	2	2	2	2	2	2	2	2	2	2	2	2	2	2	2	2	2	2	2	2	2

Source: Histoire du PSG
A = Away; H = Home; W = Win; D = Draw; L = Loss

==== Matches ====
27 August 1972 1	Paris Saint-Germain	2–0	Rennes B	Saint-Germain-en-Laye
	Renaut 20'; Marella 59'	Report		Stadium: Stade Georges Lefèvre; Attendance: 464; Referee: René Lefebvre

3 September 1972 2	Paris Saint-Germain	7–0	Concarneau	Saint-Germain-en-Laye
	Dossevi 2'; André 5', 48', 52'; Laposte 30', 75'; Renaut 80'	Report		Stadium: Stade Georges Lefèvre; Attendance: 542; Referee: Mr. Randour

10 September 1972 3	Rouen B	1–6	Paris Saint-Germain	Le Petit-Quevilly
	Marguiller 73'	Report	Renaut 23', 76'; Dossevi 32', 54', 89'; Brost 85'	Stadium: Stade Robert Diochon; Attendance: 276; Referee: Mr. Dupuy

17 September 1972 4	Paris Saint-Germain	1–1	Évreux	Saint-Germain-en-Laye
	André 75'	Report	Quesney 44' (pen.)	Stadium: Stade Georges Lefèvre; Attendance: 812; Referee: Alain Delmer

24 September 1972 5	Quevilly	2–0	Paris Saint-Germain	Le Petit-Quevilly
	Lemaître 8'; Ancelle 83'	Report		Stadium: Amable-et-Micheline-Lozai Stadium; Attendance: 1,839; Referee: Jean-Claude Swirog

1 October 1972 6	Paris Saint-Germain	1–0	Brest B	Saint-Germain-en-Laye
	André 31'	Report		Stadium: Stade Georges Lefèvre; Attendance: 702; Referee: Mr. Blangy

8 October 1972 7	Poissy	0–1	Paris Saint-Germain	Poissy
		Report	Renaut 20' (pen.)	Stadium: Stade Léo-Lagrange; Attendance: 1,528; Referee: Mr. Millont

15 October 1972 8	Paris Saint-Germain	6–0	Lucé	Saint-Germain-en-Laye
	André 4', 39', 40'; Brost 55'; Marella 58'; Vanquelles 67'	Report		Stadium: Stade Georges Lefèvre; Attendance: 795; Referee: Mr. Picard

22 October 1972 9	CA Lisieux	1–1	Paris Saint-Germain	Lisieux
	Dufay 78'	Report	Leclerc 35'	Stadium: Stade Louis-Bielman; Attendance: 1,343; Referee: Mr. Caudelier

29 October 1972 10	Paris Saint-Germain	2–0	Le Havre	Saint-Germain-en-Laye
	André 50'; Béhier 72'	Report		Stadium: Stade Georges Lefèvre; Attendance: 692; Referee: Louis Dhumerelle

5 November 1972 11	Quimper	2–0	Paris Saint-Germain	Quimper
	Delabarre 8' (pen.), 46'	Report		Stadium: Stade de Penvillers; Attendance: 2,482; Referee: Mr. Caillebotte

12 November 1972 12	Paris Saint-Germain	4–0	Red Star B	Saint-Germain-en-Laye
	André 10', 60', 85'; Renaut 47'	Report		Stadium: Stade Georges Lefèvre; Attendance: 612; Referee: Jean Muchembled

19 November 1972 13	Cholet	0–1	Paris Saint-Germain	Cholet
		Report	Dossevi 9'	Stadium: Stade Pierre-Blouen; Attendance: 1,236; Referee: Mr. Boyer

3 December 1972 14	Paris Saint-Germain	4–2	Briochin	Saint-Germain-en-Laye
	Brost 15', 53'; André 78', 80'	Report	Fort 38'; André-Jacques 85'	Stadium: Stade Georges Lefèvre; Attendance: 661; Referee: Paul Leclerc

10 December 1972 15	Vannes	1–1	Paris Saint-Germain	Vannes
	Le Nevanen 67' (pen.)	Report	Brost 87'	Stadium: Stade de la Rabine; Attendance: 976; Referee: Mr. Lochard

21 January 1973 17	Évreux	2–2	Paris Saint-Germain	Évreux
	Franchet 80', 88'	Report	Marella 23', 90'	Stadium: Stade Cambolle; Attendance: 737; Referee: Mr. Orma

4 February 1973 18	Paris Saint-Germain	1–3	Quevilly	Saint-Germain-en-Laye
	Dumot 24'	Report	Lemaître 12', 62'; Lemaire 30'	Stadium: Stade Georges Lefèvre; Attendance: 1,356; Referee: Mr. Blangy

11 February 1973 19	Brest B	1–4	Paris Saint-Germain	Brest
	Mingam 26'	Report	Dumot 51'; Dossevi 61', 64'; André 89'	Stadium: Stade Francis-Le Blé; Attendance: 467; Referee: Mr. Caillebotte

18 February 1973 16	Paris Saint-Germain	6–1	Rouen B	Saint-Germain-en-Laye
	Renaut 18', 25', 40', 86'; Leclerc 60'; Dossevi 77'	Report	Marguiller 29'	Stadium: Stade Georges Lefèvre; Attendance: 374; Referee: Mr. Inglebert

25 February 1973 20	Paris Saint-Germain	1–1	Poissy	Saint-Germain-en-Laye
	André 9'	Report	Herbette 56'	Stadium: Stade Georges Lefèvre; Attendance: 1,225; Referee: Paul Leclerc

4 March 1973 21	Lucé	1–1	Paris Saint-Germain	Lucé
	Zarotti 2'	Report	Dossevi 65'	Stadium: Stade Jean-Boudrie; Attendance: 926; Referee: Mr. Bourgeois

18 March 1973 22	Paris Saint-Germain	0–0	CA Lisieux	Saint-Germain-en-Laye
		Report		Stadium: Stade Georges Lefèvre; Attendance: 517; Referee: Mr. Paque

25 March 1973 23	Le Havre	1–2	Paris Saint-Germain	Le Havre
	Bastaraud 78'	Report	Renaut 11'; André 32'	Stadium: Stade Jules Deschaseaux; Attendance: 1,310; Referee: René Lefebvre

1 April 1973 24	Paris Saint-Germain	1–0	Quimper	Saint-Germain-en-Laye
	Dossevi 67'	Report		Stadium: Stade Georges Lefèvre; Attendance: 638; Referee: Mr. Blangy

8 April 1973 25	Red Star B	4–1	Paris Saint-Germain	Saint-Ouen-sur-Seine
	Ciani 5', 35'; González 9'; Simon 70'	Report	André 48'	Stadium: Stade Bauer; Attendance: 192; Referee: Mr. David

22 April 1973 26	Paris Saint-Germain	1–1	Cholet	Saint-Germain-en-Laye
	Brost 89'	Report	Loiseau 68'	Stadium: Stade Georges Lefèvre; Attendance: 300; Referee: Mr. Paque

29 April 1973 27	Briochin	1–4	Paris Saint-Germain	Saint-Brieuc
	Le Moullec 56'	Report	Renaut 32' (pen.); Leclerc 40'; André 67', 83'	Stadium: Fred-Aubert Stadium; Attendance: 752; Referee: Mr. Sebpix

6 May 1973 28	Paris Saint-Germain	3–0	Vannes	Saint-Germain-en-Laye
	Dumot 6'; Marella 25'; Renaut 87'	Report		Stadium: Stade Georges Lefèvre; Attendance: 463; Referee: Albert Lempereur

20 May 1973 29	Rennes B	1–0	Paris Saint-Germain	Rennes
	Mojsov 20'	Report		Stadium: Roazhon Park; Attendance: 326; Referee: Mr. Guesdon

27 May 1973 30	Concarneau	1–3	Paris Saint-Germain	Concarneau
	Mad 85'	Report	Brost 13', 44' (pen.); André 20'	Stadium: Stade Kérampéru; Attendance: 1,246; Referee: Mr. Behrens

=== Coupe de France ===
==== Preliminary rounds ====
26 November 1972 Fifth round	Paris Saint-Germain	8–0	Stade Français	Saint-Germain-en-Laye
	Ledunois 22'; Brost 26'; Dossevi 35'; Renaut 37', 40', 74'; André 53', 67'	Report		Stadium: Stade Georges Lefèvre; Attendance: 379; Referee: Mr. Capuano

19 December 1972 Sixth round	Cherbourg	0–1	Paris Saint-Germain	Cherbourg-Octeville
		Report	André 23'	Stadium: Stade Maurice-Postaire; Attendance: 2,355; Referee: Mr. Guesdon

7 January 1973 Seventh round	Paris Saint-Germain	2–2 (a.e.t.)	Beauvais	Saint-Germain-en-Laye
	André 28', 65'	Report	Quessada 38', 74'	Stadium: Stade Georges Lefèvre; Attendance: 500

14 January 1973 Seventh round replay	Beauvais	1–2	Paris Saint-Germain	Beauvais
	Béhier 90' (o.g.)	Report	Renaut 60' (pen.); André 62'	Stadium: Stade Pierre Brisson; Attendance: 1,732; Referee: Jean-Pierre Peauger

==== Round of 64 ====
28 January 1973 Single leg	Rouen	4–0	Paris Saint-Germain	Mantes-la-Ville
	Fuentes 9', 83'; Corcolle 27'; Carlier 86'	Report		Stadium: Stade Aimé Bergeal; Attendance: 1,776; Referee: Richard Pawlik

== Statistics ==
=== Appearances and goals ===
22 players featured in at least one official match, and the club scored 80 goals in official competitions.

Rank	Player	Position	Appearances	Goals	Source
1	(France) Christian André	FW	35	27	
2	(France) Bernard Béréau	DF	34	0	
3	(France) Éric Renaut	DF	32	17	
4	(Togo) Othniel Dossevi	FW	32	11	
5	(France) Jacques Laposte	MF	31	2	
6	(France) Michel Béhier	DF	31	1	
7	(France) Jean-Louis Brost	FW	30	9	
8	(France) Michel Marella	FW	29	5	
9	(France) Camille Choquier	GK	29	0	
10	(France) Robin Leclerc	MF	25	3	
11	(France) Pascal Schmitt	DF	20	0	
12	(France) Bernard Dumot	MF	17	3	
13	(France) Didier Ledunois	DF	16	1	
14	(France) Patrice Zbinden	DF	13	0	
15	(France) Bernard Lambert	DF	6	0	
16	(France) Patrice Turpin	DF	6	0	
17	(France) Thierry Coutard	MF	5	0	
18	(France) Patrice Py	GK	5	0	
19	(France) Claude Rivet	DF	5	0	
20	(France) Richard Vanquelles	FW	1	1	
21	(Tunisia) Kamel Ben Mustapha	FW	1	0	
22	(France) Christian Quéré	DF	1	0	
