= Robert Corfou =

French footballer and manager (born 1942)

Personal information
- Date of birth: 2 December 1942 (age 83)
- Place of birth: Pauillac, France
- Height: 1.85 m (6 ft 1 in)
- Position: Defender

Senior career*
Years	Team	Apps	(Gls)
1960–1964	Royan VA		
1964–1974	Entente BFN (Note: In 1966, CS Fontainebleau merged with AS Bagneaux-Nemours to create Entente Bagneaux-Fontainebleau-Nemours (Entente BFN).)		

Managerial career
- 2001: Ivory Coast
- 2001: Cameroon
- 2010–2011: Republic of the Congo
- * Club domestic league appearances and goals

Robert Corfou (born 2 December 1942) is a French football manager and former player. He was the manager of the Republic of the Congo national team. He has previously held positions with the Cameroon and Ivory Coast national football teams.

He played for Entente BFN (and previously CS Fontainebleau).

He has previously been a regional Technical director for the France national team.
