= Christian André =

French footballer (born 1950)

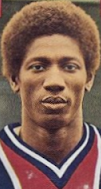
- André with Paris Saint-Germain in 1976

Personal information
- Date of birth: 14 August 1950 (age 76)
- Place of birth: La Trinité, Martinique, France
- Height: 1.70 m (5 ft 7 in)
- Position: Forward

Youth career
- Samaritaine

Senior career*
Years	Team	Apps	(Gls)
1972–1977	Paris Saint-Germain	65	(32)
1975–1976	→ Red Star (loan)		
1977–1978	Béziers		
1978–1979	Montpellier		
- * Club domestic league appearances and goals

Christian André (born 14 August 1950) is a French former professional footballer who played as a forward.

== Career ==
André, who is originally from Martinique, was recruited by Paris Saint-Germain in 1972 with fellow Trinitaire Jacques Laposte, after the club had been relegated to the Division 3 following a split with Paris FC. In his first season with PSG, he quickly established himself as a key player in Robert Vicot's side. Nicknamed the "black panther", André scored 21 goals in 30 Division 3 games to help the Parisian club achieve promotion to the Division 2. He was PSG's top scorer during the 1972–73 season.

In his second season at the club, André scored 14 goals in all competitions, as PSG was promoted for the second time in a row, this time to Division 1. André started in several matches, but was then relegated to the bench in favour of Mustapha Dahleb and François M'Pelé.

In the 1974–75 season, André suffered a knee ligament injury. He was loaned to Red Star in January 1975, and returned from loan eighteen months later. Unable to establish himself in the squad, he signed for Béziers in 1977. After one season at Béziers he joined Montpellier in 1978, lasting one season before retiring.

== Post-playing career ==
After retiring, André briefly coached in Martinique, then returned to metropolitan France where he coached young players in Gagny in 2003. He then became a groundskeeper at football pitches in the Paris area. André left Paris for Provence and Corsica.
