= Entente Bagneaux-Fontainebleau-Nemours =

Defunct football club in Seine-et-Marne, France

Entente BFN
- Full name: Entente Bagneaux-Fontainebleau-Nemours
- Nickname(s): L'Entente (The Entente)
- Short name: Entente BFN
- Founded: 1966
- Dissolved: 1978

Entente Bagneaux-Fontainebleau-Nemours was a football club based in the towns of Bagneaux-sur-Loing, Fontainebleau, and Nemours in France. It was founded in 1966 as a result of the merger between AS Bagneaux-Nemours and CS Fontainebleau. However, it split in 1978, and CS Fontainebleau returned to its former name. The successor of AS Bagneaux-Nemours is Entente Bagneaux-Nemours-Saint-Pierre.

The club played in the Championnat de France Amateur from 1966 to 1970 and in the Division 2 from 1970 to 1978.

== Notable former players ==
- (France) Jean-Pierre Adams
- (France) Bernard Béréau
- (France) Jean-Louis Brost
- (France) Robert Corfou
- (France) Philippe Mahut
- (France) Christian Quéré

== Honours ==
Entente Bagneaux-Fontainebleau-Nemours honours
Honours	No.	Years
Championnat de France Amateur runner-up	3	1966–67, 1967–68, 1968–69
