= Albert Poli =

Football player and manager (1945–2008)

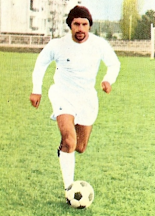
- Poli with Angers in the 1971–72 season

Personal information
- Birth name: Alberto Poli
- Date of birth: 21 May 1945
- Place of birth: Colzate, Italy
- Date of death: 6 December 2008 (aged 63)
- Place of death: Saint-Malo, France
- Height: 1.74 m (5 ft 9 in)
- Position: Midfielder

Senior career*
Years	Team	Apps	(Gls)
1962–1965	Audun-le-Tiche		
1965–1974	Angers	286	(35)
1974–1975	Paris Saint-Germain	30	(2)
1975–1976	Rennes	35	(3)
1976–1978	Rouen	51	(0)
1978–1982	Digne		

Managerial career
- 1978–1987: Digne
- 1987–1995: Dinan
- * Club domestic league appearances and goals

Albert Poli (born Alberto Poli; 21 May 1945 – 6 December 2008) was a professional footballer who played as a midfielder. Born in Italy, he moved to France at the age of two and was later naturalized.

== Career ==
Poli played as a midfielder. He began his career at amateur club Audun-le-Tiche before signing for Angers in 1965. After nine years with Angers, he signed for Paris Saint-Germain, who had only just been promoted to the Division 1. However, he left the club after one season only. Poli would go on to play for Rennes (one season) and Rouen (two seasons) before becoming player-manager at Digne in 1978. He stopped playing football in 1982 to take the full job of manager at the club.

== Personal life and death ==
Poli was born in the town of Colzate in Italy. He emigrated to France at the age of two. During the 1974–75 season, during which he played for Paris Saint-Germain, he became a naturalized French citizen, 27 years after initially moving to France.

In 1987, Poli became the manager of Dinan. He simultaneously took a job as a sports instructor in a primary school in the area of Dinan. In 1995, he stopped managing the football club of the town, but continued in his sports coach position until 2003, when he retired. He died on 6 December 2008 due to cancer.

== Honours ==
=== Player ===
Angers

- Division 2: 1968–69

=== Manager ===
Digne

- Division d'Honneur: 1978–79
- Division 4 Group H: 1980–81
- Coupe de Provence: 1983
