= Robin Leclerc =

French footballer (born 1952)

Personal information
- Date of birth: 5 November 1952 (age 73)
- Place of birth: Paris, France
- Height: 1.78 m (5 ft 10 in)
- Position: Midfielder

Youth career
- JS Suresnes

Senior career*
Years	Team	Apps	(Gls)
1970–1971	Châteauroux	14	(0)
1971–1976	Paris Saint-Germain B		
1972–1976	Paris Saint-Germain	25	(3)
1977–1978	Poissy		
- * Club domestic league appearances and goals

Robin Leclerc (or Leclercq; born 5 November 1952) is a French former professional footballer who played as a midfielder.

== Career ==
=== Early career ===
Leclerc was a youth product of JS Suresnes's football school. In 1970, he joined Châteauroux. In one season with the club in the Division 2, he made a total of 14 appearances. However, he joined the reserve side of Paris Saint-Germain in 1971.

=== Paris Saint-Germain ===
In 1972, Paris Saint-Germain split into two; Paris FC kept the first team, but lost the club identity, while PSG were handed the reserve team, and kept the club identity. Having been part of the B team the previous season, Leclerc was now one of PSG's key players during the 1972–73 season in the Division 3. He would make 25 appearances and score 3 goals in all competitions that season.

From 1973 to 1976, Leclerc stayed at PSG, but mostly played for the B team. However, he notably participated in two matches in the Division 1 during the 1974–75 season. Leclerc left the club in 1976.

=== Poissy ===
In 1977, Leclerc signed for Poissy. He would go on to retire after his departure in 1978.

== After football ==
Later in his life, Leclerq became a football agent in Bath, England.
