= FCUS Ambert =

Football club in Ambert, France

Ambert
- Full name: Football Club Union Sportive Ambert
- Founded: 1921/1922
- President: Guy Corbinet
- League: Régional 2 Auvergne-Rhône-Alpes; Group C
- Website: https://fcusa.footeo.com/

Football Club Union Sportive Ambert is a football club located in Ambert, France. Founded in the early 1920s, they play in the Régional 2, the seventh tier of French football. The colours of the club are blue and white.

The highest tier Ambert has played in is the Division 4, which they reached in the 1990–91 season. Ambert notably reached the round of 64 of the Coupe de France in the 1994–95 edition of the tournament, but were eliminated by Nancy after 1–0 loss.

== Honours ==
FCUS Ambert honours
Honour	No.	Years
Division d'Honneur Auvergne	3	1925–26, 1989–90, 1993–94

== Notable former players ==
- (Guinea) Titi Camara
- (Togo) Othniel Dossevi
