= Bernard Dumot =

French footballer (born 1950)

Personal information
- Date of birth: 14 August 1950 (age 76)
- Place of birth: Châteauroux, France
- Height: 1.71 m (5 ft 7 in)
- Position: Midfielder

Senior career*
| Years | Team | Apps | (Gls) |
| 1970–1972 | Châteauroux | 1 | (0) |
| 1972–1976 | Paris Saint-Germain | 32 | (3) |
| 1976 | Orléans | | |
| 1976–1978 | Paris FC | 42 | (3) |
| Total | | 75+ | (6+) |

International career
- France Amateurs
- * Club domestic league appearances and goals

Bernard Dumot (born 14 August 1950) is a French former professional footballer who played as a midfielder.

== Club career ==
Dumot joined Paris Saint-Germain in 1972 after having been recommended by the manager Robert Vicot, who had known him at Châteauroux. He took part in the club's promotion from the Division 3 to the Division 2 in his first season, scoring 3 goals in the process. He would also participate in PSG's successive promotion to the Division 1 in 1974.

Dumot's "best hour" came when he was handed a start in the Parisian derby against Red Star in the Division 1. He would leave PSG in 1976, after having made 36 appearances and scored 4 goals in all competitions. After a brief spell at Orléans, he joined Paris FC, where he would retire in 1978.

== International career ==
Dumot was an amateur international for France.

== After football ==
Having worked as an apprentice at age 14, Dumot opened a home appliance repair company in Saint-Germain-en-Laye after his retirement. He would open a similar company in the north of France later on.

In 2006, Dumot retired from his previous businesses, and went to live in the Deux-Sèvres department. After having opened a football school, he became the president of US Chey-Chenay-Sepvret, an amateur football club.
