= Jacky Novi =

French footballer (born 1946)

Personal information
- Full name: Jacques Novi
- Date of birth: 18 July 1946 (age 80)
- Place of birth: Bellegarde, Gard, France
- Height: 1.74 m (5 ft 9 in)
- Position: Defender

Senior career*
| Years | Team | Apps | (Gls) |
| 1964–1968 | Nîmes | 128 | (3) |
| 1968–1973 | Marseille | 172 | (12) |
| 1973–1974 | Nîmes | 24 | (1) |
| 1974–1977 | Paris Saint-Germain | 139 | (6) |
| 1977–1980 | Strasbourg | 82 | (1) |
| Total | | 545 | (23) |

International career
| 1969–1972 | France | 20 | (0) |

Managerial career
- 1995–1997: Rodez
- 1997–1998: Fréjus
- 2000–2002: Alès
- * Club domestic league appearances and goals

Jacques Novi (born 18 July 1946), most commonly called Jacky Novi, is a French former professional footballer who played as a defender. He is the player with the eighth-most appearances in the French championship.
