= Jean-Philippe Dehon =

French footballer and manager (born 1956)

Personal information
- Date of birth: 6 April 1956 (age 70)
- Place of birth: Sebourg, France
- Height: 1.72 m (5 ft 8 in)
- Position: Midfielder

Youth career
- 1973–1974: Aulnoye

Senior career*
Years	Team	Apps	(Gls)
1974–1979	FC Metz	117	(13)
1979–1983	Tours	100	(21)
1983–1984	Olympique Marseille	15	(1)
1984–1985	FC Metz	4	(0)
1985–1986	Bourges		
1986–1987	SC Hazebrouck		
1987–1988	Savonnières		

Managerial career
- 1987–1988: Savonnières
- * Club domestic league appearances and goals

Jean-Philippe Dehon (born 6 April 1956) is a retired French football player and manager.

== Club career ==
Dehon has played the majority of his career at FC Metz.
