= Claude Arribas =

French footballer (born 1951)

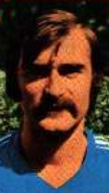
- Arribas with Bordeaux in the 1975–76 season

Personal information
- Date of birth: 13 August 1951 (age 75)
- Place of birth: Le Mans, France
- Height: 1.80 m (5 ft 11 in)
- Positions: Midfielder; defender

Youth career
- 1967–1969: Nantes

Senior career*
Years	Team	Apps	(Gls)
1969–1974	Nantes	48	(6)
1971–1972	→ Paris Saint-Germain (loan)	33	(2)
1974–1976	Bordeaux	50	(11)
1976–1978	Rennes	55	(3)
1978–1981	Cannes	86	(19)
1981–1985	Angers	102	(13)
1985–1988	AL Châteaubriant		
Total		374+	(54+)

International career
- France U21
- * Club domestic league appearances and goals

Claude Arribas (born 13 August 1951) is a French former professional footballer who played as a midfielder and defender.

== International career ==
Arribas was a youth international for France at various levels, including at under-21 level.

== Personal life ==
Arribas is of Basque Spanish descent; his father José, who was a football player and manager, was born in Bilbao. Claude played under his father when he was manager at Nantes.

After retiring from football, Arribas became a sales adviser in a food company near Angers.

== Honours ==
Nantes

- Division 1: 1972–73
- Coupe de France runner-up: 1969–70, 1972–73
