= Christian Quéré =

French footballer (1955–2002)

Personal information
- Full name: Christian François Louis Quéré
- Date of birth: 30 January 1955
- Place of birth: Locmaria-Berrien, France
- Date of death: 24 July 2002 (aged 47)
- Place of death: Langeac, France
- Height: 1.74 m (5 ft 9 in)
- Position: Defender

Youth career
- 1971–1972: Entente BFN

Senior career*
Years	Team	Apps	(Gls)
1972–1975	Paris Saint-Germain	8	(0)
1977–1983	Fontainebleau		
- * Club domestic league appearances and goals

Christian François Louis Quéré (30 January 1955 – 24 July 2002) was a French professional footballer who played as a defender.

== Career ==
Quéré was a youth product of Entente BFN. He joined Paris Saint-Germain in 1972, at the age of 17. With PSG, he achieved two successive promotions to bring the club back to the Division 1, making a total of 9 appearances across all competitions along the way.

Quéré returned to Entente BFN before the end of his career, and even captained the side. It was renamed CS Fontainebleau in 1978. He retired in 1983.

== Personal life and death ==
Quéré went to live in Versailles in the Île-de-France region after retiring from football. He died in 2002.
