= Jacky Bade =

Guadeloupean footballer (born 1945)

Personal information
- Full name: Jacques Bade
- Date of birth: 2 November 1945 (age 80)
- Place of birth: Capesterre-de-Marie-Galante, Guadeloupe, France
- Height: 1.78 m (5 ft 10 in)
- Position: Defender

Youth career
- JS Capesterre

Senior career*
Years	Team	Apps	(Gls)
- FC Tarascon
1966–1967	Toulouse	2	(0)
1970–1973	Albi		
1973–1976	Paris Saint-Germain	51	(0)

International career
- Guadeloupe
- France Amateurs
- * Club domestic league appearances and goals

Jacques "Jacky" Bade (born 2 November 1945) is a Guadeloupean former professional footballer who played as a defender. Born in Guadeloupe, he played for the France amateur national team and represented Guadeloupe at senior level during his career.

== Club career ==
Bade played for several different clubs during his career. He initially started off as a youth player for his hometown club of JS Capesterre before joining FC Tarascon in France. He had departed to metropolitan France in 1964 in order to pursue medical studies.

In January 1966, Bade joined Division 1 club Toulouse. However, he would only make a total of two appearances for the club, leaving in 1967. Three years later, he signed for amateur club Albi.

In 1973, Bade signed for Paris Saint-Germain, joining to help the Parisian defense. He therefore reunited with his mentor Just Fontaine (manager of PSG at the time), with whom he had shared a linked path in Toulouse, Albi, and Paris. With PSG, Bade would go on to make 62 appearances across all competitions. He retired at the age of 31 after suffering a serious ligament injury due to a foul by Avignon defender Didier Gilles on 17 January 1976.

== International career ==
Bade previously played for the France amateur national team. He also represented his native island of Guadeloupe at cadet, youth, and senior level.

== Player profile ==
Being a defender, Bade's style of play was compared to the one of Marius Trésor for his strong interventions in play. However, despite his capabilities, he was injury-prone, having dealt with various adductor and ligament injuries during his career.

== After football ==
After having completed his final exam in pediatrics a couple of months after retiring from football in 1976, Bade returned to Guadeloupe and opened a pediatric office in Pointe-à-Pitre. He still worked in this job as of 2013. From 1990 to at least 2013, he was president of the Football Artistique Club (FAC), who participated in numerous friendly matches.

== Personal life ==
Jacky's father Ludovic was the mayor of Capesterre-de-Marie-Galante, Jacky's birthplace, from 1935 to 1971.

His brother José died in 1994. He was a big fan of sports and cycling. A stadium in Capesterre was named in honour of him.
