= Michel Marella =

French footballer (born 1946)

Personal information
- Date of birth: 28 September 1946 (age 80)
- Place of birth: Grasse, France
- Height: 1.74 m (5 ft 9 in)
- Position: Forward

Youth career
- 1956–1964: Cannes

Senior career*
Years	Team	Apps	(Gls)
1964–1966	Antibes		
1966–1967	US Issoire		
1971–1972	AS Banque de France		
1972–1975	Paris Saint-Germain	49	(11)
1975–1976	Cannes	31	(9)
1977–1982	Grasse		
- * Club domestic league appearances and goals

Michel Marella (born 28 September 1946) is a French former footballer who played as a forward. He is known for playing a key part in Paris Saint-Germain's successive promotions in 1973 and 1974 to make their way back to the Division 1.

== Career ==
=== Early career and military service ===
Marella was born in Grasse, in the Alpes-Maritimes department of France. He played youth football with Cannes, the club he would later rejoin as a pro. In 1964, at the age of 17, Marella stopped playing football. He began to play tennis and boules instead, and then left for the army at the Fort Carré in Antibes, "the equivalent of INSEP," according to him. With the army, he would briefly play for Antibes's football team, and then with US Issoire in the Division d'Honneur. He then left for Paris. There, he had a Corsican friend who wanted him to come play at AS Banque de France, which he did from 1971 to 1972.

=== Paris Saint-Germain ===
In 1972, Camille Choquier, who was then goalkeeper at Paris Saint-Germain (PSG), came to Marella to ask to come join him at PSG, when the club was in the Division 3 following the split with Paris FC (PFC). Choquier knew Marella previously, having seen him play in Cannes. Marella accepted the invitation, and he joined PSG that year.

With Paris Saint-Germain, Marella was promoted to the Division 2 in his first season. They followed up with a successive promotion to the Division 1 in 1974 to bring the club back to the professional level it had prior to the split with Paris FC. Meanwhile, PFC suffered relegation to the Division 2. Marella played a large part in securing first division football, as he was one of the goal-scorers during PSG's 4–2 play-off victory over Valenciennes at the Parc des Princes in 1974.

In an interview with PSG70, Marella said that he "played football while having a job on the side". When Louis Floch joined PSG on a professional contract, Marella was relegated to the bench; he was not on a pro contract. He would leave the club in 1975, having scored a total of 14 goals and made 58 appearances across three seasons.

=== Return to Cannes ===
Marella subsequently joined his former youth club Cannes in 1975. He stayed there one season in the Division 2, making 31 league appearances and scoring 9 league goals. Despite having a team capable of "playing for promotion" with players such as Jean Baeza, Leif Eriksson, and Francis Isnard, Cannes played poorly in the second half of the season and did not achieve their objective.

=== Grasse ===
In 1977, Marella signed for his hometown club of Grasse. Achieving promotion to the Division 4, he would retire there in 1982.

== Personal life ==
While playing football at an amateur level, Marella was also an employee in a children's clothing manufacturing company called Katimini. Additionally, he was a real estate agent in Grasse in for over 32 years.
