= Othniel Dossevi =

Togolese footballer (born 1947)

Personal information
- Full name: Othniel Dossevi
- Date of birth: 13 January 1947 (age 79)
- Place of birth: Lomé, French Togoland
- Height: 1.74 m (5 ft 9 in)
- Positions: Winger; forward

Youth career
- 1962–1963: Étoile Filante de Lomé

Senior career*
Years	Team	Apps	(Gls)
1963–1967	Tours		
1967–1971	Montferrand		
1971–1972	Ambert		
1972–1975	Paris Saint-Germain	19	(7)
1975–1977	Paris FC	33	(12)
1977–1978	Jeanne d'Arc		
1980–1981	Pithiviers		
1981–1982	Avion		
- * Club domestic league appearances and goals

Othniel Dossevi (born 13 January 1947) is a Togolese former professional footballer who played as a winger and forward.

== Career ==
Dossevi started playing football in France for Tours in 1963. He was the first African to play for Paris Saint-Germain, and also scored the first PSG goal ever scored at the Parc des Princes, in a match against Red Star on 10 November 1973. Dossevi played for PSG for three seasons, and later played for Paris FC between 1975 and 1977. From 1977 to 1978, he was a player at Senegalese club Jeanne d'Arc, but from 1978 to 1980, he was executive director at the club. In 1980, Dossevi returned to France to play amateur football with Pithiviers and Avion before retiring in 1982.

Dossevi never played for the Togo national team due to his opposition to Togolese dictator Gnassingbé Eyadéma. He has stated: "I would not have been able to play for the team of a man who reigned over Togo from 1967 until his death in 2005, who stole and killed people and who did not envisage democracy. But [not having represented Togo] it is a great regret."

== Personal life ==
Dossevi was born in Lomé, French Togoland, He moved to Tours, France in 1963, and later became a naturalized French citizen. After retiring from football, he worked as a French, Greek, Latin, and literature teacher at the Lycée Camille-Jullian in Bordeaux. Dossevi's brother Pierre-Antoine is a retired footballer and his nephews Thomas and Mathieu are also footballers. Othniel's children, Damiel and Narayane, are also athletes.

On 21 July 2020, before the kick-off of a friendly match between PSG and Celtic at the Parc des Princes, Dossevi was handed a 2020–21 Paris Saint-Germain home shirt with his name on it, and took part in PSG TV's pre-match build-up. He also gave the ceremonial kick-off of the match. The club had organized this to commemorate 50 years of PSG, and Dossevi was honoured for being the first African player and the first goal-scorer of the club at the Parc des Princes.
