= Jacques Laposte =

French footballer (born 1952)

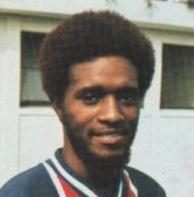
- Laposte with Paris Saint-Germain in the 1977–78 season

Personal information
- Date of birth: 24 March 1952 (age 74)
- Place of birth: La Trinité, Martinique, France
- Height: 1.70 m (5 ft 7 in)
- Position: Midfielder

Youth career
- La Gauloise de Trinité

Senior career*
Years	Team	Apps	(Gls)
1972–1979	Paris Saint-Germain	139	(14)

International career
- France U21
- France Military
- * Club domestic league appearances and goals

Jacques "Jacky" Laposte (born 24 March 1952) is a French former professional footballer who played as a midfielder. He spent his entire senior career at Paris Saint-Germain.

== Club career ==
Laposte began his career in his hometown club of La Gauloise de Trinité in La Trinité, Martinique. In 1972, he and fellow Trinitaire Christian André joined Paris Saint-Germain, then in the Division 3. He helped the club gain successive promotions to the Division 1, notably scoring a 25-meter volley in a 6–1 win over Arles on 12 May 1974 in the Division 2.

In 1977, Laposte suffered a serious knee injury, which sidelined him for the entirety of the 1977–78 season. He left PSG in 1979, having scored 17 goals in 175 appearances, and subsequently retired.

== International career ==
While at Paris Saint-Germain, Laposte became a U21 international for France. He went on to play for the France Military team as well.

== After football ==
After retiring, Laposte returned to Martinique, where he became a hospital worker.
