= Robert Vicot =

French footballer (1931–2026)

Personal information
- Date of birth: 29 October 1931
- Place of birth: Ivry-sur-Seine, France
- Date of death: 6 January 2026 (aged 94)
- Position: Defender

Senior career*
Years	Team	Apps	(Gls)
1945–1955	Ivry sur Seine		
1955–1956	Bazar de l'Hôtel de Ville		
1956–1964	Toulon		
1964–1967	SO Le Lavandou		

Managerial career
- 1964–1967: SO Le Lavandou
- 1967–1971: Châteauroux
- 1971–1972: Paris SG (youth)
- 1972–1975: Paris SG
- 1975–1976: Rouen
- 1976–1979: Paris FC
- 1979–1980: Gabon
- 1980–1985: Rouen
- 1986: Béziers
- * Club domestic league appearances and goals

Robert Vicot (French: [ʁɔbɛʁ viko]; 29 October 1931 – 6 January 2026) was a French professional footballer who played as a defender. He played for Ivry-sur-Seine, Bazar de l'Hôtel de Ville, Toulon and SO Le Lavandou.

Vicot coached SO Le Lavandou, Châteauroux, Paris SG, Rouen, Paris FC, Gabon and Béziers.

Vicot died on 6 January 2026, at the age of 94.
