= Le Classique =

French football rivalry

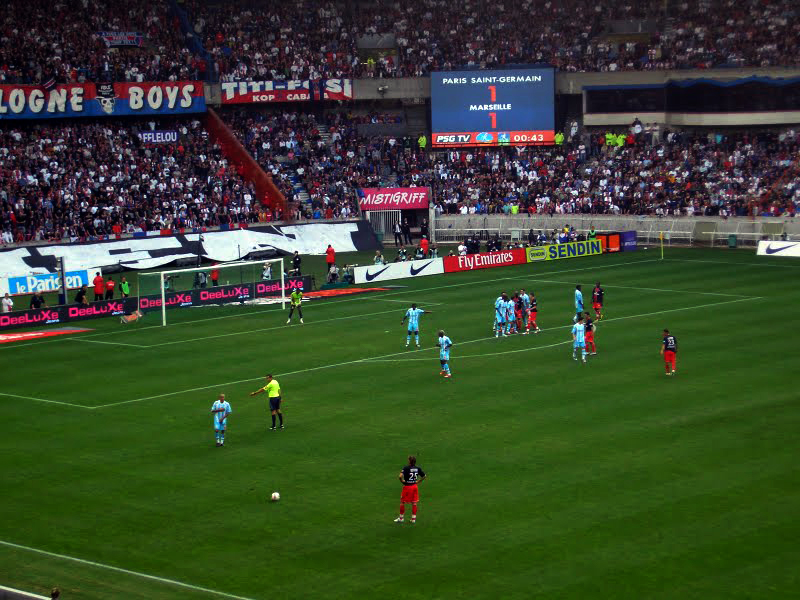
- PSG–OM at the Parc des Princes in 2007.
- Other names: Le Classico, Le Clasico, Le Derby de France
- Location: France
- Teams: Paris Saint-Germain; Olympique de Marseille
- First meeting: 12 December 1971; Division 1 Marseille 4–2 Paris Saint-Germain
- Stadiums: Parc des Princes, Paris; Stade Vélodrome, Marseille

Statistics
- Total meetings: 113
- Most wins: Paris Saint-Germain (54)
- Most player appearances: Steve Mandanda (30)
- Top scorer: Zlatan Ibrahimović (11)
- All-time record: Paris Saint-Germain: 54; Drawn: 24; Marseille: 35
- Largest victory: 8 February 2026; Ligue 1 Paris Saint-Germain 5–0 Marseille

Le Classique (French: [lə klasik]; lit. 'The Classic'), also referred to as Le Classico, Le Clasico, or Le Derby de France, is a French football rivalry contested between French professional clubs Paris Saint-Germain (PSG) and Olympique de Marseille (OM). It is widely regarded as the biggest rivalry in French football and one of the most notable fixtures in world football, involving the two most successful clubs in France and the only French teams to have won major European trophies. The match is often compared to Spain's El Clásico and attracts significant attention in domestic and international football circles.

PSG and OM dominated French football before Olympique Lyonnais disrupted their domestic supremacy in the early 2000s and remain the most followed French clubs internationally. Both clubs consistently rank among the highest in French attendances. Early clashes in the 1970s gave little indication of a major rivalry: PSG, a newly formed club, was still building competitiveness, while OM were established Ligue 1 contenders. The rivalry began in earnest in the 1980s, particularly after PSG won their first league title in 1986 and Marseille was acquired by businessman Bernard Tapie. By the end of the decade, the two clubs were competing closely for the Ligue 1 title, with tensions heightened by accusations of match-fixing and other controversies.

In the 1990s, the rivalry intensified. French media company Canal+ purchased PSG in 1991, partly to challenge Marseille's dominance, while media coverage helped promote the animosity between the clubs. With financial backing and growing media attention, PSG and OM became the main contenders for national honours. Although both teams were less successful in the 2000s, the rivalry remained strong. In the 2010s, PSG's significant investment from Qatar Sports Investments (QSI) allowed the club to dominate domestically, further intensifying the rivalry. Matches regularly draw large crowds, high television audiences, and require heightened security due to passionate fan support.

The rivalry has a female equivalent, featuring Paris Saint-Germain and OL Lyonnes (Lyon). Matches between the two sides are referred to as the women's Le Classique. By the end of the 2000s, French women's football was dominated by Lyon, which won a record number of Première Ligue and UEFA Women's Champions League titles. PSG first faced Lyon in 1994, but it was not until the club's acquisition by QSI in 2012 that the two sides emerged as genuine rivals, consistently competing for league honours.

== History ==
=== Origins and early encounters ===
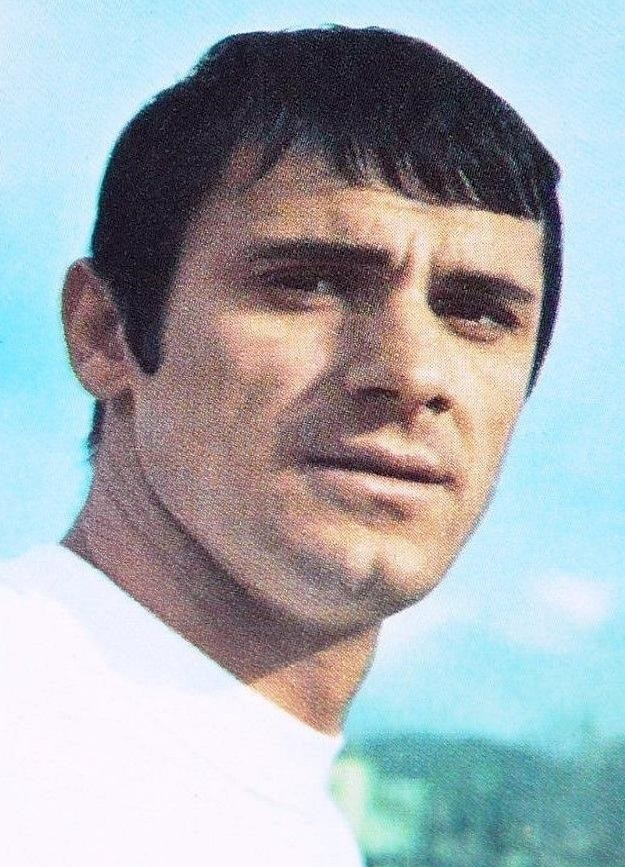
Josip Skoblar scored twice for OM in the inaugural match.

Le Classique is the name given to matches between Paris Saint-Germain (PSG) and Olympique de Marseille (OM). The term is inspired by El Clásico, contested between Real Madrid and Barcelona, which was itself borrowed by the Spanish press from South American football, where clásico is commonly used to describe major rivalries such as the Superclásico between Boca Juniors and River Plate or the Uruguayan Clásico between Nacional and Peñarol. The fixture is also referred to as Le Classico, Le Clasico, or Le Derby de France.

PSG was founded in 1970 and, during their early years, did not operate at the same level as OM, one of the traditional powerhouses of French football. Established in 1899, Marseille had competed regularly for trophies and, for much of their history, were more focused on rivalries with clubs such as Saint-Étienne or Bordeaux than on matches against the newly formed Parisian side. Today, the rivalry is considered the greatest in French football and one of the most significant in European club football. PSG and OM are the most successful clubs in France and the only French sides to have won major European trophies. Before the emergence of Olympique Lyonnais in the early 2000s, they were the undisputed leading teams in the country and remain the two most popular French clubs. Both sides routinely top attendance charts each season.

Like all great football rivalries, the Classique carries historical, cultural, and social significance beyond the sport itself. In France, it is often framed as a contest between the nation's two greatest cities: Paris versus Marseille, the capital versus the province, north versus south, the centre of political power versus the working class, and the club of the elite versus the club of the people. Ironically, PSG were originally founded as a team owned by their supporters, while OM was established by a group of aristocratic enthusiasts. The foundations of a fierce rivalry were therefore present from the outset.

The first meeting between the clubs took place on 12 December 1971 at the Stade Vélodrome, where Marseille secured a 4–2 victory. Josip Skoblar scored twice, while Bernard Bosquier and Didier Couécou also found the net, with Bosquier registering the first goal in the history of the Classique. Michel Prost scored both goals for PSG. The rivalry intensified in 1975 during the Coupe de France quarter-finals. On 9 May, Marseille drew 2–2 at home after leading by two goals, with François M'Pelé scoring twice for PSG. The result sparked violent incidents among Marseille supporters after the final whistle. In the return leg on 13 May, PSG claimed their first-ever victory over Marseille with a 2–0 home win at the Parc des Princes, thanks to goals from Louis Floch and Jacques Laposte. At the end of the match, Marseille players Caju and Jairzinho assaulted the referee, leading to suspensions that ended their careers at the club.

Several notable encounters followed in the late 1970s. On 8 January 1978, after nine unsuccessful attempts (seven defeats and two draws), PSG finally defeated Marseille in the league. Although Boubacar Sarr opened the scoring for OM from the penalty spot, PSG responded decisively, routing their opponents 5–1. François M’Pelé scored twice, with additional goals from François Brisson, Mustapha Dahleb, and an own goal by Marius Trésor. The following year, on 7 April 1979, PSG defeated Marseille 4–3 in a match that remains the highest-scoring in the fixture's history, with Carlos Bianchi scoring the decisive goal. Having lost every previous visit to the south since their inaugural meeting in 1971, the Parisians secured their first away victory on 8 December 1979, defeating Marseille 2–0 at the Stade Vélodrome with goals from Boubacar Sarr and Jean-François Beltramini, in a season that ended with Marseille's relegation.

=== Marseille's golden era ===
The year 1986 marked the true beginning of the rivalry. PSG won their first league title, while French businessman Bernard Tapie acquired OM. Tapie immediately invested heavily in star players such as Chris Waddle, Abedi Pelé, Jean-Pierre Papin, Basile Boli, Enzo Francescoli, Eric Cantona, Didier Deschamps, and Marcel Desailly, transforming Marseille into a dominant force in French football. Later that year, on 28 November 1986, OM recorded their largest victory over PSG, a 4–0 win at the Stade Vélodrome, with Papin scoring the final goal. The rivalry intensified further on 21 May 1988, when PSG secured a 2–1 away victory over Marseille, through goals from Safet Sušić and a late strike by Gabriel Calderón, a result that denied OM qualification for European competition. The match was overshadowed by controversy after PSG defender Michel Bibard mimicked the referee's whistle, causing Papin to halt a clear scoring opportunity. At the final whistle, Tapie reportedly confronted the referee, reportedly threatening that he would not guarantee his safety upon leaving the stadium.

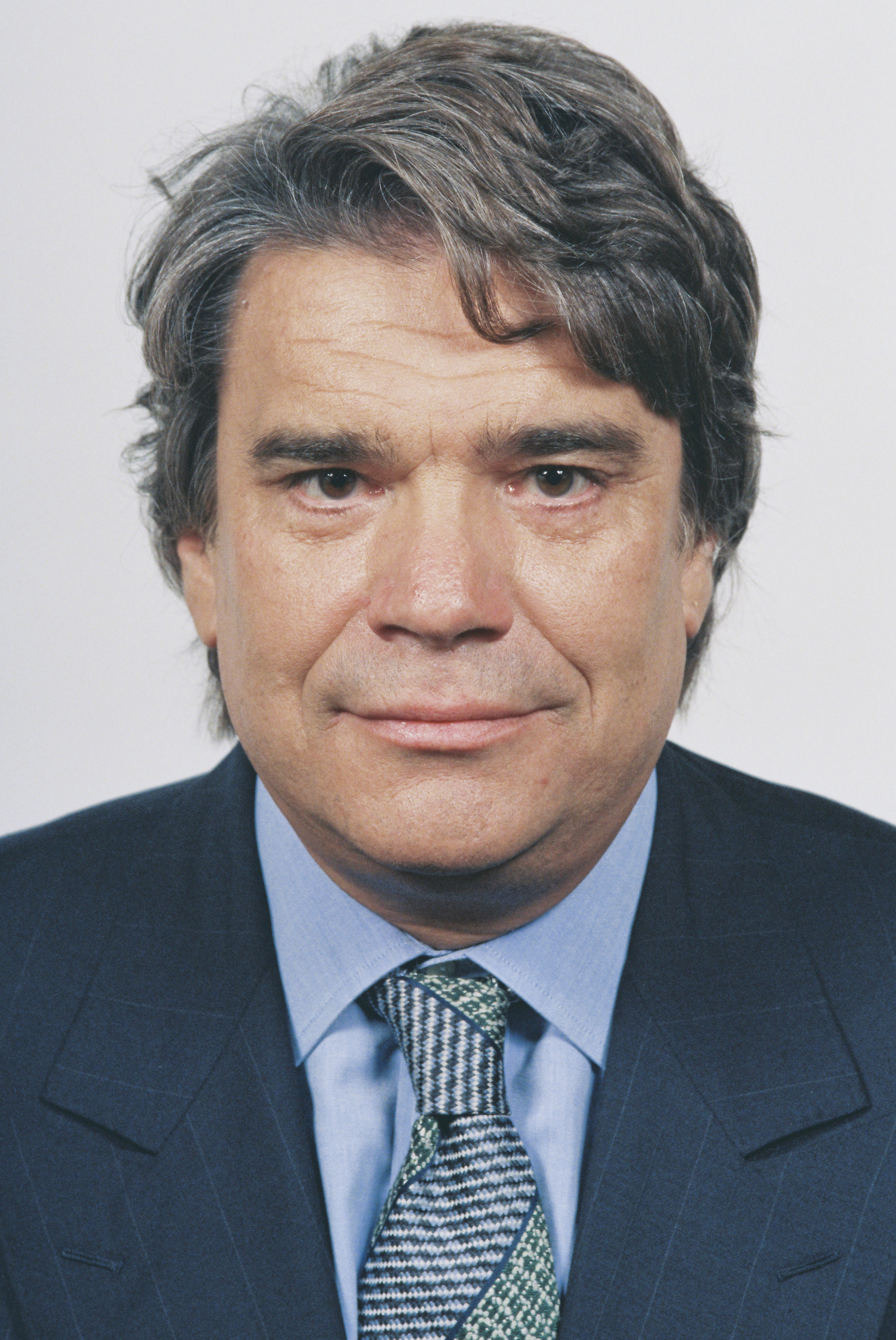
OM president Bernard Tapie in 1994.

The following season culminated on 5 May 1989 with a decisive title clash at the Stade Vélodrome. In the buildup, Bernard Tapie and his PSG counterpart Francis Borelli heightened tensions by exchanging barbs in the media. With the match goalless and league leaders PSG edging closer to a second league title, the contest appeared destined for a draw. However, in stoppage time, Franck Sauzée unleashed a 25-yard strike past goalkeeper Joël Bats to secure a 1–0 victory. The result propelled Marseille to the top of the standings, a position they maintained to claim their first French championship in 17 years.

PSG became more competitive after being acquired by French media company Canal+ in 1991. The takeover was intended to revive interest in a Ligue 1 increasingly dominated by Marseille and to build a squad capable of challenging Tapie's side. Tapie actively encouraged Canal+ to elevate the rivalry, and with substantial financial backing, PSG recruited high-profile players such as David Ginola, Youri Djorkaeff, George Weah, and Raí. Many observers regard Marseille (1989–1994) and PSG (1993–1998) as two of the strongest teams in French football history.

In the 1990s, the rivalry was characterized by heightened media scrutiny and an increase in both on- and off-field violence, including a rise in incidents involving supporters. One of the most infamous encounters took place on 18 December 1992 at the Parc des Princes. Before the match, PSG manager Artur Jorge declared that his team would "crush" Marseille, while David Ginola promised "war"—comments that Bernard Tapie reportedly displayed in OM's dressing room to motivate his players. Later dubbed the "Butchery of 1992," the match is remembered less for Marseille's 1–0 victory, courtesy of an Alen Bokšić goal, than for the roughly fifty fouls called and the brutal tackles by OM's Éric Di Meco and PSG's Patrick Colleter. In the return match, on 29 May 1993, Marseille defeated PSG 3–1 in another title-deciding match, coming from behind to seal the win with a team move finished by a phenomenal header from Basile Boli.

Between 1989 and 1993, Marseille won four consecutive Ligue 1 championships and lifted the 1992–93 UEFA Champions League. OM supporters continue to commemorate this European triumph with the motto "Forever first." However, this period of success was also overshadowed by allegations of corruption involving Marseille, raised by PSG, Monaco, and other clubs. These suspicions were confirmed after the 1992–93 season, when Tapie and OM were found guilty in the French football bribery scandal. The French Football Federation stripped Marseille of the title, and the club was administratively relegated to Ligue 2 in 1994.

=== The Big Eight: PSG's rise ===
Marseille have since accused Parisian elites of conspiring to make PSG the dominant French club, a dynamic FIFA described as a clash between "the chosen ones of French football (the politically favored PSG) and their enfants terribles (the rebel OM)." During the 1990s, PSG won several trophies, including the 1995–96 UEFA Cup Winners' Cup, becoming the second French club to claim a major European title after OM. Marseille quickly returned to the top flight in 1996 after two seasons in Ligue 2, although their new owner was less willing to invest than Bernard Tapie had been. At the same time, Canal+ gradually reduced its financial commitment to PSG. Despite these changes, the rivalry remained intense. Between September 1990 and February 2000, OM lost only twice to their northern rivals, before the balance of power shifted in the early 2000s, when PSG went on an eight-match winning streak between 2002 and 2004.

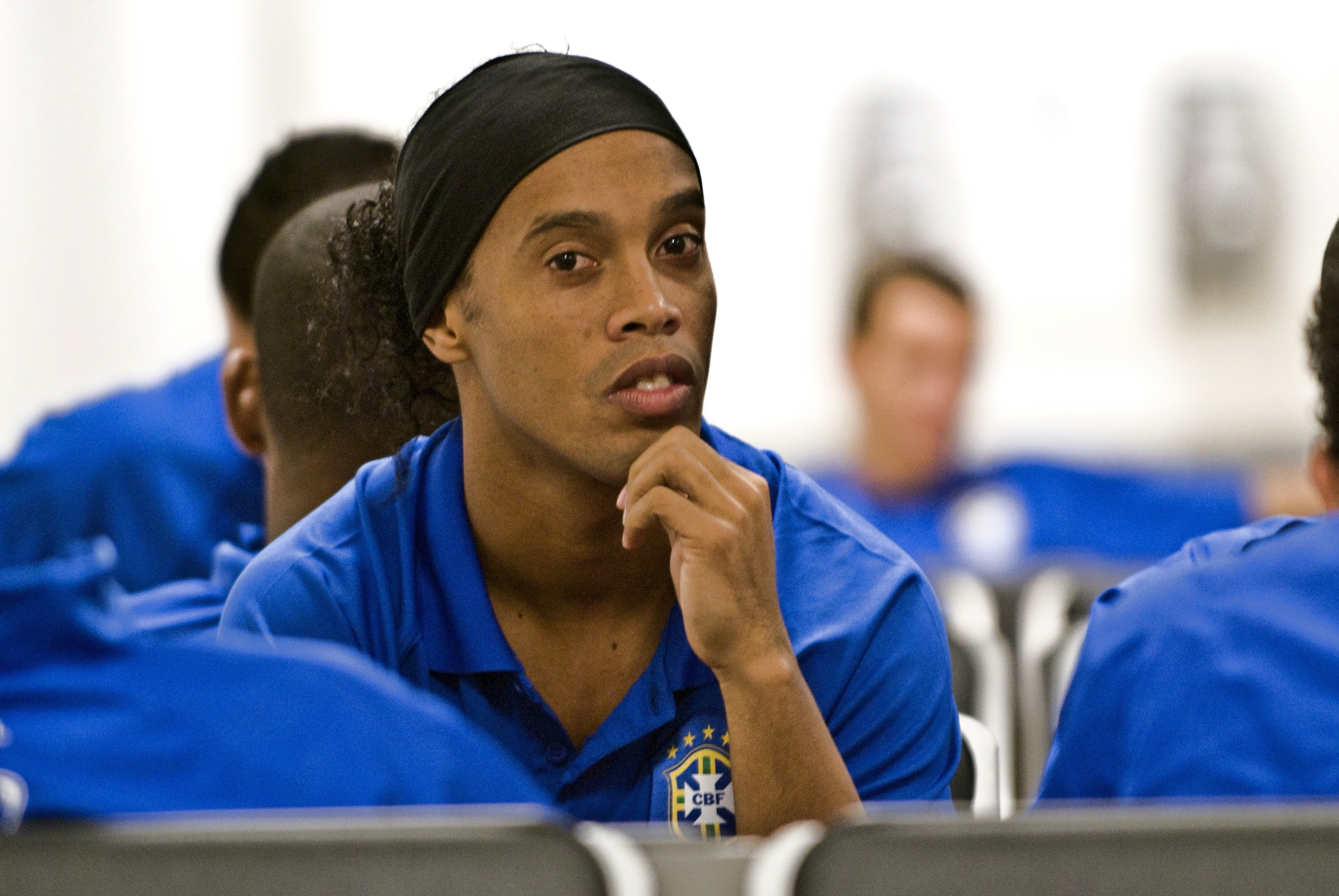
Ronaldinho terrorized Marseille defenders during the early 2000s.

On 8 November 1997, PSG were defeated 2–1 at the Parc des Princes following a controversial penalty converted by Laurent Blanc, with Paris alleging that Fabrizio Ravanelli had simulated the foul. PSG responded on 4 May 1999, securing their first league victory over Marseille since April 1990. Although PSG had little to play for in the standings, they were determined to prevent Marseille from winning the championship. Late goals from Marco Simone and Bruno Rodriguez gave PSG a 2–1 win, with Simone celebrating his equalizer by displaying a Batman tattoo to the Marseille supporters. In the final round, PSG lost to Bordeaux, allowing the Girondins to claim the league title. The following season, on 15 February 2000, Marseille reasserted themselves with a 4–1 home victory in a match that featured red cards, on-field confrontations between former PSG teammates Laurent Leroy and Jérôme Leroy, and Florian Maurice celebrating by throwing his shoe toward the OM supporters.

PSG's winning run began on 26 October 2002, when Ronaldinho inspired a 3–0 victory at the Parc des Princes, scoring from a free kick, converting a penalty, and assisting the third goal. Manager Luis Fernandez celebrated the opener with an improvised samba. The streak continued on 9 March 2003, as PSG recorded another 3–0 win, their first at the Stade Vélodrome since May 1988. Jérôme Leroy opened the scoring with a 25-yard strike, while Ronaldinho added a goal and an assist following two solo runs from his own half.

The Parisians secured a second consecutive victory at the Vélodrome for the first time in their history on 30 November 2003, when Fabrice Fiorèse scored in stoppage time and celebrated by covering his ears in front of the Marseille supporters. Nine months later, Fiorèse joined OM, describing the move as "a dream come true." The sequence of wins continued on 25 April 2004, when Pauleta starred in a 2–1 victory, scoring twice, including a chip from a tight angle over Fabien Barthez that is widely regarded as one of the rivalry’s finest goals.

Tensions escalated on 7 November 2004, when former PSG players Frédéric Déhu and Fabrice Fiorèse returned to the Parc des Princes with Marseille. PSG defender Sylvain Armand was sent off after just twenty minutes for a violent tackle on Fiorèse, who was also targeted by projectiles from the crowd and required police protection. Despite being a man down for most of the match, PSG secured a 2–1 victory thanks to goals from Pauleta and Édouard Cissé. Three days later, on 10 November 2004, the teams faced off again in the Coupe de la Ligue. PSG, fielding several substitutes, overcame a two-goal deficit as Branko Bošković scored twice to equalize, and Bernard Mendy completed a dramatic last-minute winner after dribbling past goalkeeper Fabien Barthez. The 3–2 comeback marked PSG's eighth consecutive victory over Marseille, a streak celebrated by Parisian supporters as "The Big Eight."

=== First domestic cup final ===
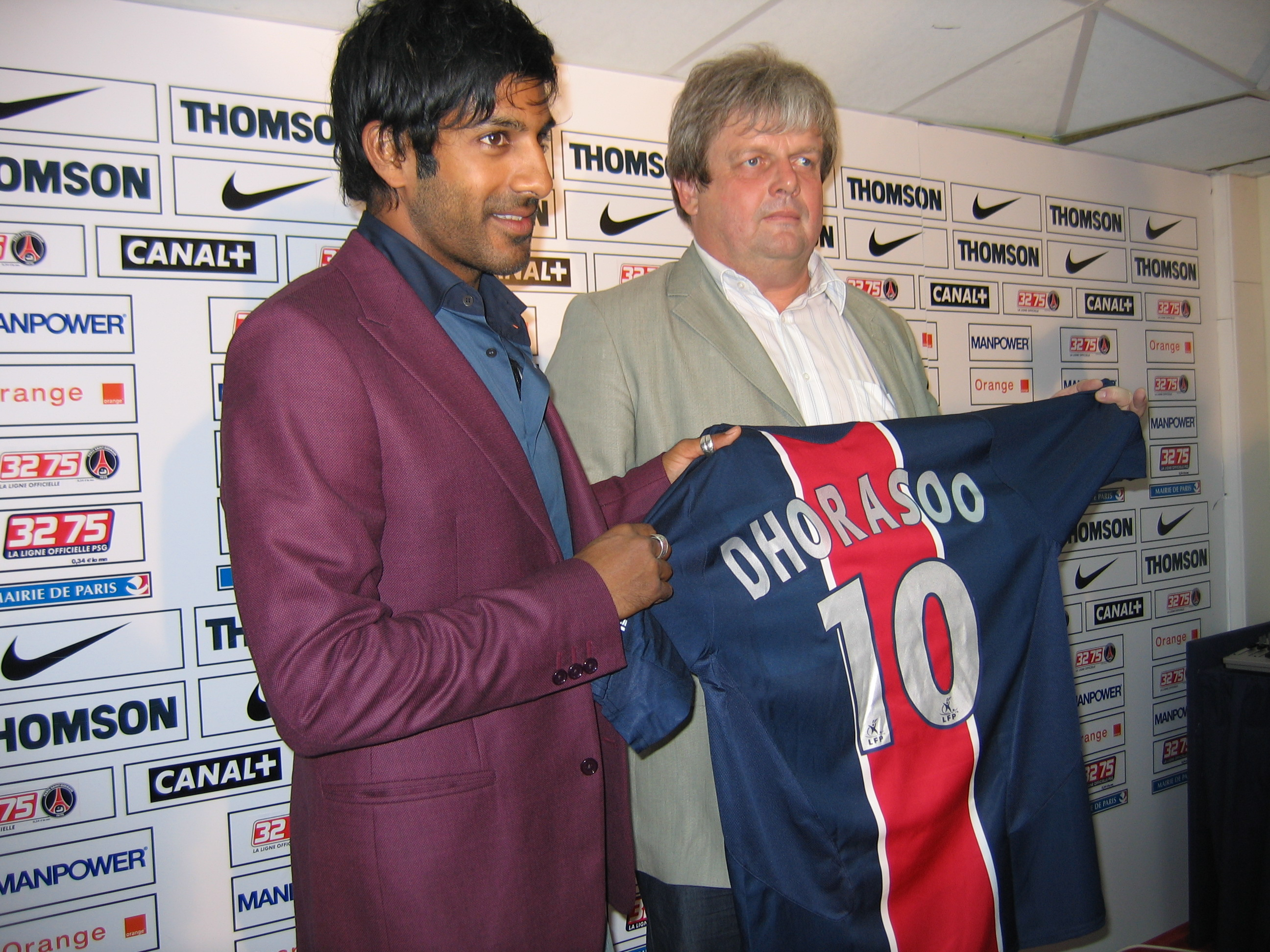
Vikash Dhorasoo scored PSG's winning goal in the 2006 Coupe de France final.

Marseille ended PSG's winning run on 16 October 2005, recording their first victory in the fixture since April 2002, at the beginning of a period in which OM largely dominated the rivalry between 2005 and 2011. Lorik Cana, who had joined Marseille directly from PSG a few months earlier, scored the only goal of the match. Two hours before kick-off, an ammonia-like smell reportedly permeated the PSG dressing room, forcing the visitors to relocate to another changing room beneath the home supporters. Allegations also emerged that OM had arranged for French adult film actress Clara Morgane to walk past the PSG dressing room in an attempt to distract the players. PSG manager Laurent Fournier publicly criticized the incidents, while OM president Pape Diouf responded that his opponents needed to "learn to accept defeat."

Amid growing hostility between supporters, visiting allocations were reduced for the return match on 5 March 2006, when PSG hosted Marseille at the Parc des Princes. In protest, Diouf sent Marseille's reserve and youth players to the fixture, a side later nicknamed "The Boys" by OM supporters. The team secured a 0–0 draw and received a celebratory welcome upon their return to Marseille. A few weeks later, on 29 April 2006, PSG responded by defeating Marseille's first team 2–1 in the 2006 Coupe de France final, the first time the clubs had met in a domestic cup final. Bonaventure Kalou opened the scoring early, and Vikash Dhorasoo doubled the lead with a 25-yard strike before Toifilou Maoulida reduced the deficit. PSG held on to claim the trophy.

After four consecutive league seasons without an away win at Marseille, PSG recorded a 4–2 victory at the Stade Vélodrome on 26 October 2008, scoring four goals there for the first time in their history. OM had entered the match unbeaten in the league, but Guillaume Hoarau scored twice to secure the win, strengthening PSG's position in the title race and preventing Marseille from moving to the top of the table. In the return fixture on 15 March 2009 at the Parc des Princes, PSG could have moved into first place with a victory. Instead, Marseille prevailed 3–1. Boudewijn Zenden opened the scoring—falling into an advertising hoarding during his celebration—before Ludovic Giuly equalized just before half-time. Zoumana Camara's second-half dismissal proved decisive, and goals from Bakari Koné and Lorik Cana lifted Marseille above PSG in the standings and effectively ended the Parisian title challenge.

Originally scheduled for October 2009, the match was postponed after PSG players Ludovic Giuly, Mamadou Sakho and Jérémy Clément were diagnosed with H1N1 influenza during the swine flu pandemic, leading to the entire Paris squad being quarantined at their hotel in Marseille. When the match was eventually played on 20 November 2009, OM secured a 1–0 victory at the Stade Vélodrome, with former PSG defender Gabriel Heinze scoring the only goal against his former club. The return fixture on 28 February 2010 was overshadowed by clashes between rival PSG ultra factions, which resulted in the death of one supporter and prompted the club to dissolve its main supporter groups. On the pitch, goals from Hatem Ben Arfa, Lucho González and Benoît Cheyrou gave OM a 3–0 victory at the Parc des Princes, their largest win at the ground, as they went on to win Ligue 1 that season.

=== Parisian supremacy ===
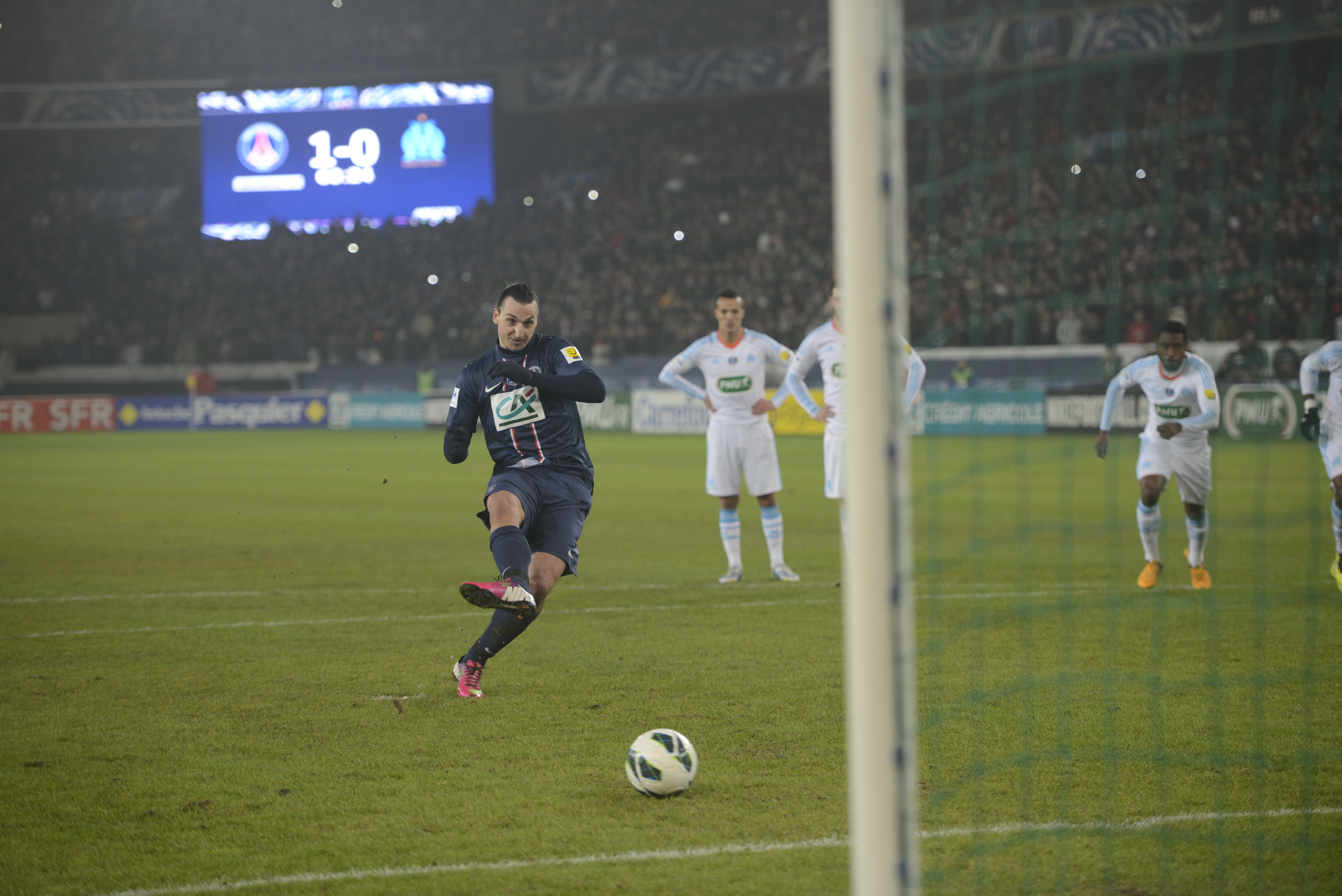
Zlatan Ibrahimović scores from the penalty spot against Marseille in February 2013.

Ligue 1 champions Marseille faced Coupe de France winners PSG in the 2010 Trophée des Champions on 28 July 2010. The match ended 0–0 after regular time and was decided by a penalty shootout. OM goalkeeper Steve Mandanda saved attempts from Peguy Luyindula and Ludovic Giuly, while PSG midfielder Édouard Cissé converted the decisive spot-kick, securing Marseille's first victory over Paris in a cup final.

Later that year, on 7 November 2010, PSG recorded their first home victory over OM since November 2004. Nenê played a key role throughout the match. Mevlüt Erdinç opened the scoring after Mandanda failed to hold a shot from the Brazilian, and Guillaume Hoarau doubled the lead soon after, finishing through the goalkeeper's legs following a chipped pass from Nenê. Lucho González reduced the deficit, but Marseille were unable to find an equalizer at the Parc des Princes.

Freshly acquired by the government-operated Qatar Sports Investments (QSI), PSG arrived at Marseille as league leaders, featuring ambitious signings such as Javier Pastore, Blaise Matuidi and Jérémy Ménez. However, they were unable to assert themselves, and Marseille outplayed them at the Stade Vélodrome on 27 November 2011. Goals from Loïc Rémy and André Ayew both with headers, as well as a curling strike from Morgan Amalfitano, secured a comprehensive 3–0 victory for OM.

On 7 October 2012, the sides met at the Stade Vélodrome, occupying first and second place for the first time since January 1994. André-Pierre Gignac opened the scoring for Marseille and later added a second to secure a 2–2 draw, after Zlatan Ibrahimović had temporarily put PSG ahead with a back-heeled volley and a 25-yard free kick. More than two years later, on 5 April 2015, PSG visited Marseille as reigning champions of the previous two Ligue 1 seasons, featuring key players such as Thiago Silva, Thiago Motta, Ibrahimović, and Edinson Cavani. Second-placed OM struck first through Gignac, and although Blaise Matuidi quickly equalized with a top-corner strike, Gignac restored Marseille's lead. In the second half, Paris drew level again through Marquinhos before an own goal from Jérémy Morel handed PSG a 3–2 victory, keeping them on course for the league title.

On 21 May 2016, ten years after their first meeting at this stage, PSG and Marseille faced each other again in the 2016 Coupe de France final at the Stade de France. PSG was aiming to complete a second consecutive domestic treble, while Marseille sought to salvage a disappointing season after finishing 13th in Ligue 1. As in 2006, PSG lifted the trophy following a 4–2 victory. Although Marseille held firm until half-time at 1–1, they were unable to contain Zlatan Ibrahimović, who scored twice and provided an assist in his final appearance for the club. With eleven goals in Le Classique, the Swedish striker remains the fixture's all-time leading scorer. The win also marked PSG's tenth consecutive victory against Marseille.

Amid PSG's dominance in the Classique during the 2010s, which extended to a record 20 consecutive matches without defeat, the club recorded its largest victory at the Stade Vélodrome on 26 February 2017. Goals from Marquinhos, Edinson Cavani, Lucas Moura, Julian Draxler, and Blaise Matuidi secured PSG's second 5–1 triumph over Marseille, following a home victory by the same scoreline in January 1978. The match also marked the first time PSG scored five goals at the Vélodrome, surpassing the four goals they had netted there in October 2008.

=== Battle of Paris ===
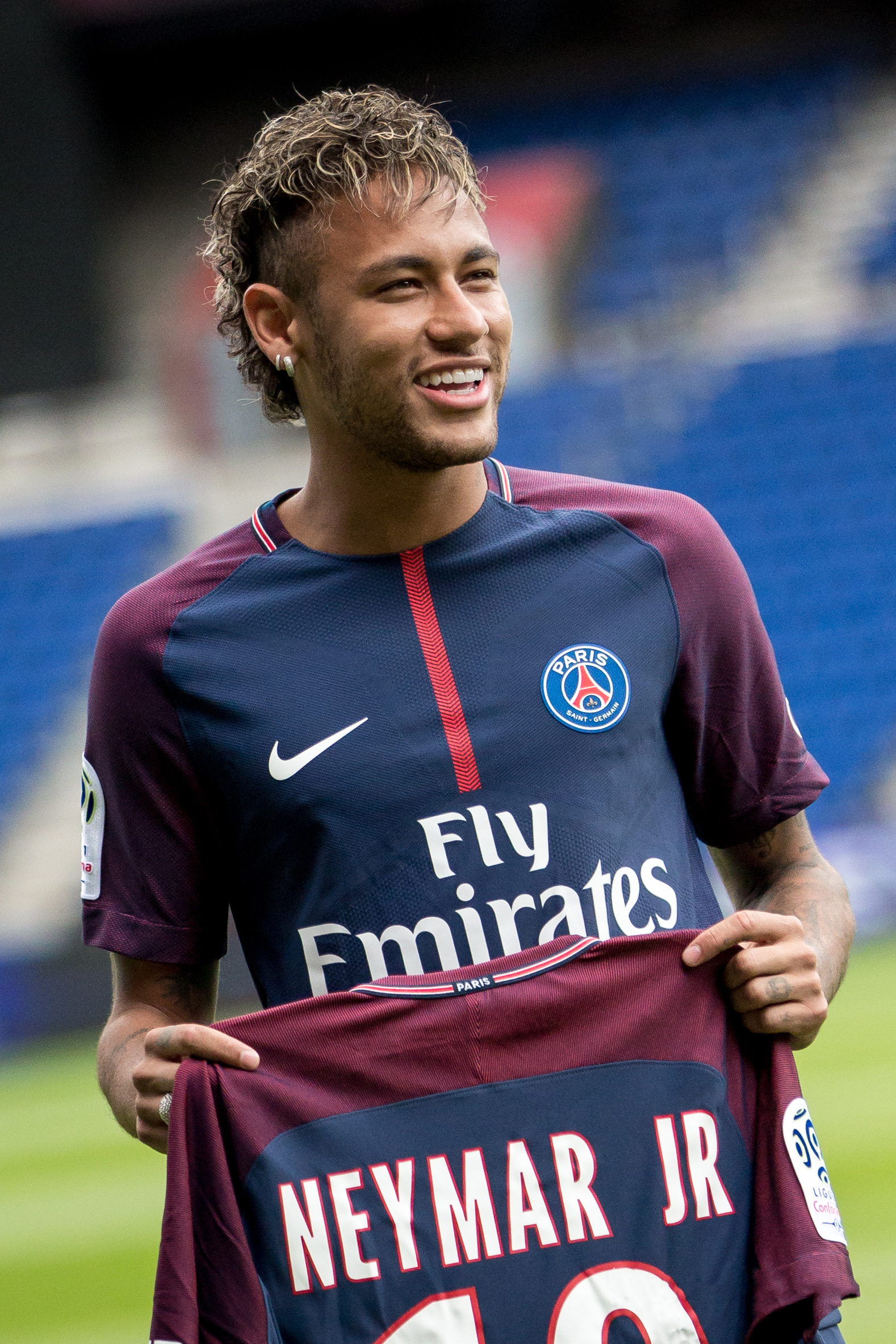
Neymar was a key figure in the rivalry during the 2020s.

Less than a year after their heavy home defeat, OM delivered a markedly different performance on 22 October 2017. The match marked Neymar's first Classique appearance, and the Brazilian forward was closely monitored by the Stade Vélodrome crowd. In one of the fixture's most dramatic encounters, Neymar played a central role, first by scoring to equalize Luiz Gustavo's 30-yard opener and later receiving a red card for an altercation, reducing PSG to ten men. Ten minutes from the final whistle, Florian Thauvin restored Marseille's lead, but Edinson Cavani scored a last-minute free kick that silenced the stadium, securing a 2–2 draw and denying the home side a victory.

A year later, on 28 October 2018, with Edinson Cavani sidelined, Kylian Mbappé was initially benched by PSG manager Thomas Tuchel after arriving late to a team meeting. Despite this, Mbappé became the decisive player of the match. In a still-uncertain Classique at the hour mark, he made an immediate impact by scoring following a superb individual run just three minutes after coming on, marking his first goal at the Stade Vélodrome. Late in the match, Marseille were unable to equalize due to a foul simulation from Marquinhos, and Julian Draxler secured the 2–0 victory for PSG in stoppage time, capitalizing on a misdirected shot from Neymar as Marseille pressed for a comeback. Draxler celebrated by cupping his ears to the home fans.

On 27 October 2019, PSG hosted Marseille at the Parc des Princes, where a banner from the home supporters set the tone for the match, reading: "We have been hammering you for eight years and it’s not over." Mauro Icardi and Kylian Mbappé each scored twice in the first half as PSG secured a 4–0 victory. This match marked PSG's twentieth and final unbeaten fixture against OM, a run in which the Parisians won seventeen times—including ten consecutive victories—and drew the remaining three encounters. The second-leg Classique between Marseille and PSG, scheduled for 22 March 2020 at the Stade Vélodrome, was never played, marking the first time a match in the rivalry was cancelled. On 30 April 2020, the Ligue de Football Professionnel (LFP) awarded the 2019–20 Ligue 1 title to PSG following the cancellation of the season by the French government due to the COVID-19 pandemic.

Following years of uncontested Parisian supremacy, the rivalry was reignited shortly after PSG's defeat in the 2020 UEFA Champions League final. Ahead of the Classique on 13 September 2020, Marseille midfielder Dimitri Payet mocked PSG on social media, pointing out that OM remained the only French club to have won the competition. On the pitch, Florian Thauvin scored the only goal of the match, volleying in Payet's free kick to secure Marseille's first victory over PSG since November 2011. The encounter descended into chaos in added time, when a mass brawl led to five red cards. Neymar, Leandro Paredes, and Layvin Kurzawa were dismissed for PSG, while Darío Benedetto and Jordan Amavi were sent off for Marseille. In the aftermath, Neymar accused Álvaro of making a racist remark towards him, an allegation the Spanish defender denied. Neymar was in turn accused of making homophobic and racist comments towards Álvaro and Hiroki Sakai; however, the LFP took no disciplinary action due to insufficient evidence. Sakai later publicly cleared Neymar of any wrongdoing. PSG winger Ángel Di María received a four-match ban for spitting at Álvaro. The heated encounter was subsequently dubbed the "Battle of Paris" by the media.

=== Record win for PSG ===
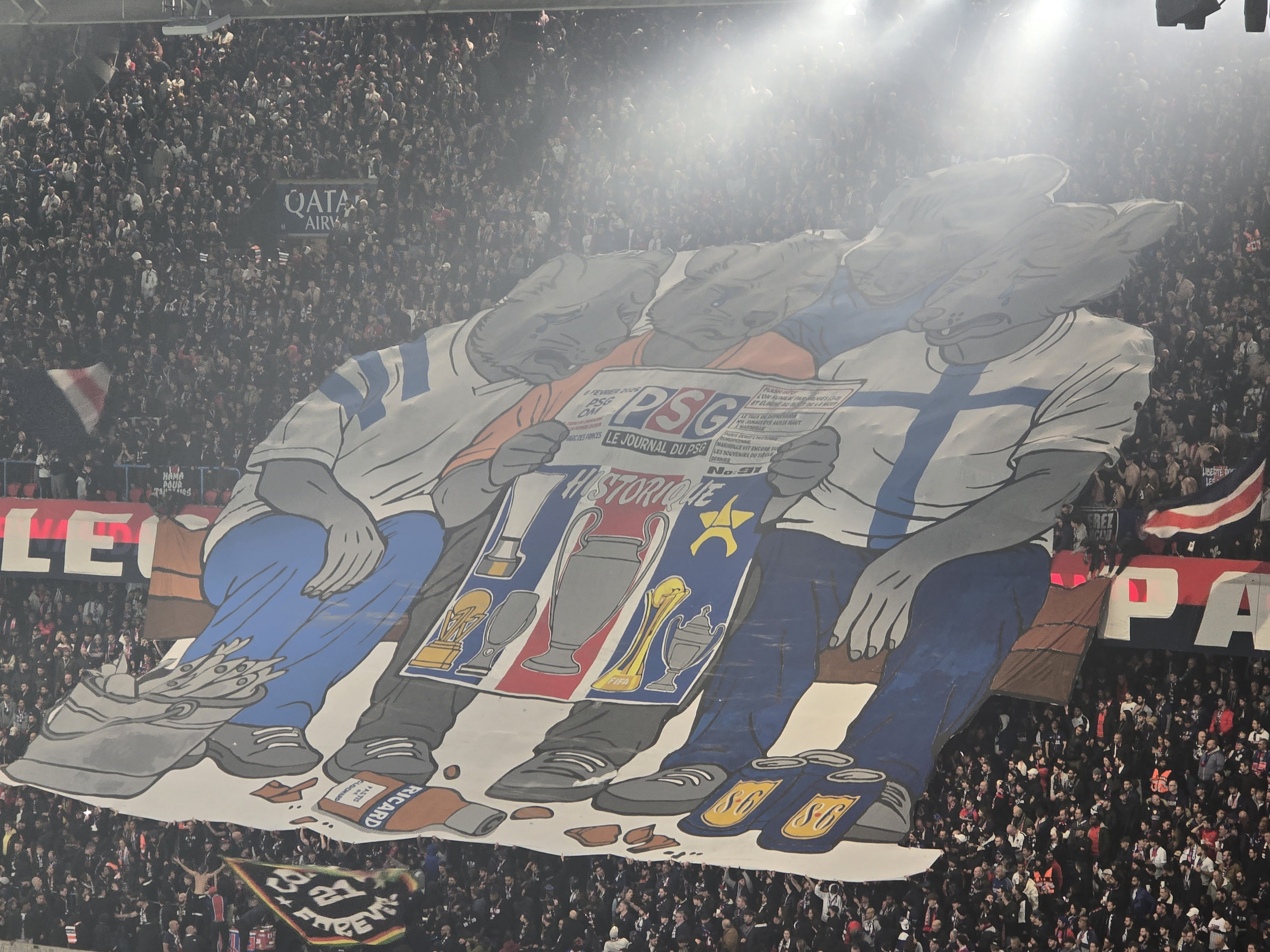
PSG fans mocked OM during their record 5–0 victory in February 2026.

PSG gained revenge in the 2020 Trophée des Champions on 13 January 2021, defeating Marseille 2–1. Mauro Icardi put PSG ahead six minutes before half-time. During the second half, Neymar was repeatedly fouled by Álvaro, but the Brazilian ultimately had the final say by converting the decisive penalty. Dimitri Payet reduced the deficit with one minute remaining; however, PSG held on to secure the title. After the match, Neymar mocked both Álvaro and Payet on social media.

Marseille returned to winning ways at the Stade Vélodrome on 8 February 2023, reaching the quarter-finals of the Coupe de France with a 2–1 victory. Alexis Sánchez converted a penalty conceded by Sergio Ramos to give the hosts the lead. Ramos later equalized with a header just before half-time, but ten minutes into the second half Ruslan Malinovskyi restored OM's advantage with a powerful strike from the edge of the box. The victory marked Marseille's first Coupe de France triumph over PSG since April 1991, nearly 32 years after their 2–0 win at the Parc des Princes. It was also their first cup win against PSG at the Vélodrome and their first home victory in the Classique since November 2011. PSG responded emphatically on 26 February 2023 with a 3–0 league victory at the Vélodrome, ending Marseille's title hopes. Lionel Messi scored his first and only goal in the Classique, while Kylian Mbappé's brace made him PSG's all-time leading scorer.

Two years later, on 22 September 2025, Marseille ended another negative run on home soil. Originally scheduled for the previous day, the match was postponed due to heavy rainfall. Despite PSG seeking to avoid a clash with the 2025 Ballon d'Or ceremony, OM insisted that the fixture be played within 24 hours of the initial postponement in accordance with league regulations and threatened legal action if it was not. While PSG were being named the world's best team in Paris, an own goal by Marquinhos, following an error by goalkeeper Lucas Chevalier, secured OM's first home league victory over their rivals since November 2011.

The Olympians were again the better side in the 2025 Trophée des Champions on 8 January 2026, but it was PSG who ultimately lifted the trophy. An early lob from Ousmane Dembélé gave PSG the advantage, and they appeared on course for victory. Marseille mounted a late comeback, moving ahead through a Mason Greenwood penalty and an own goal by Willian Pacho. However, in the closing seconds, Gonçalo Ramos equalized to force a penalty shootout, in which PSG goalkeeper Lucas Chevalier saved two spot-kicks as Paris prevailed 4–1. A month later, on 8 February 2026, PSG defeated Marseille 5–0 at the Parc des Princes. Dembélé scored twice, while an own goal by Facundo Medina made it 3–0 before substitutes Khvicha Kvaratskhelia and Lee Kang-in added further goals. The result marked the largest margin of victory in the history of the fixture and avenged PSG's defeat at the Vélodrome in September.

== Supporters ==
=== Violent incidents ===
- 9 May 1975. Marseille supporters pelted the PSG team bus with stones as it departed the Stade Vélodrome.
- 29 May 1993. Clashes between both sets of supporters at the Stade Vélodrome left fourteen people injured. The incidents reportedly began after Marseille fans were targeted with a dozen flares thrown by PSG supporters, who also set fire to several OM shirts during the match.
- 11 April 1995. Following clashes between fans of both teams, 146 people were arrested and nine police officers were hospitalized.
- 4 May 1999. The match at the Parc des Princes began with clashes between the two sets of supporters on the pitch before kick-off.
- 13 October 2000. Geoffrey Dilly, an 18-year-old Marseille supporter, was struck by a seat thrown from the PSG section and left paralyzed for life.
- 7 November 2004. PSG supporters pelted the Marseille team bus with stones upon its arrival at the Parc des Princes, resulting in minor injuries to OM manager José Anigo.
- 4 February 2007. Marseille supporters threw stones at the PSG team bus, as well as at buses transporting Parisian fans, upon their arrival at the Stade Vélodrome.
- 15 March 2009. During the match, PSG supporters threw over 60 flares, including four rockets directed toward the visiting stands, one of which caused neck burns to a Marseille fan.
- 26 October 2009. Amid the 2009 swine flu pandemic, three PSG players were diagnosed with H1N1 influenza and the match was postponed just hours before its scheduled kick-off. Around 2,000 Parisian supporters had already arrived in Marseille, and clashes erupted between rival groups. A dozen individuals were arrested by CRS riot police, and ten people were injured, including one who required leg surgery after being struck by a car.
- 28 February 2010. Clashes between rival PSG ultra factions led to the death of one supporter and prompted the club to disband its main supporter groups.
- 5 April 2015. Before kick-off near the Stade Vélodrome, Marseille fans threw stones and other objects at the PSG team bus. PSG striker Zlatan Ibrahimović was reportedly nearly struck by a golf ball that pierced the window of manager Laurent Blanc's vehicle. Police clashed with OM supporters who were blocking a nearby roundabout, using tear gas to disperse the crowd. Eight officers sustained minor injuries, and eight Marseille fans were arrested.
- 21 May 2016. Before the 2016 Coupe de France final at the Stade de France, clashes broke out between PSG and OM supporters. Paris won the match 4–2, and after the final whistle, angry Marseille fans ignited two flares in the stands and set fire to several seats. Thirty people were arrested, though no injuries were reported.
- 28 February 2018. Upon returning to the Parc des Princes for the first time since 2014, Marseille fans caused significant damage to the stadium. They tore out at least 137 seats from the away stand, some of which were moved to the side stands, and also vandalized the restrooms.
- 18 August 2020. Following PSG's UEFA Champions League semi-final victory against RB Leipzig, fans of both clubs clashed in Marseille. A man was arrested for assaulting a person wearing a PSG shirt, while hundreds of OM supporters chanted anti-Paris slogans and set off firecrackers.

=== Tifo choreographies ===
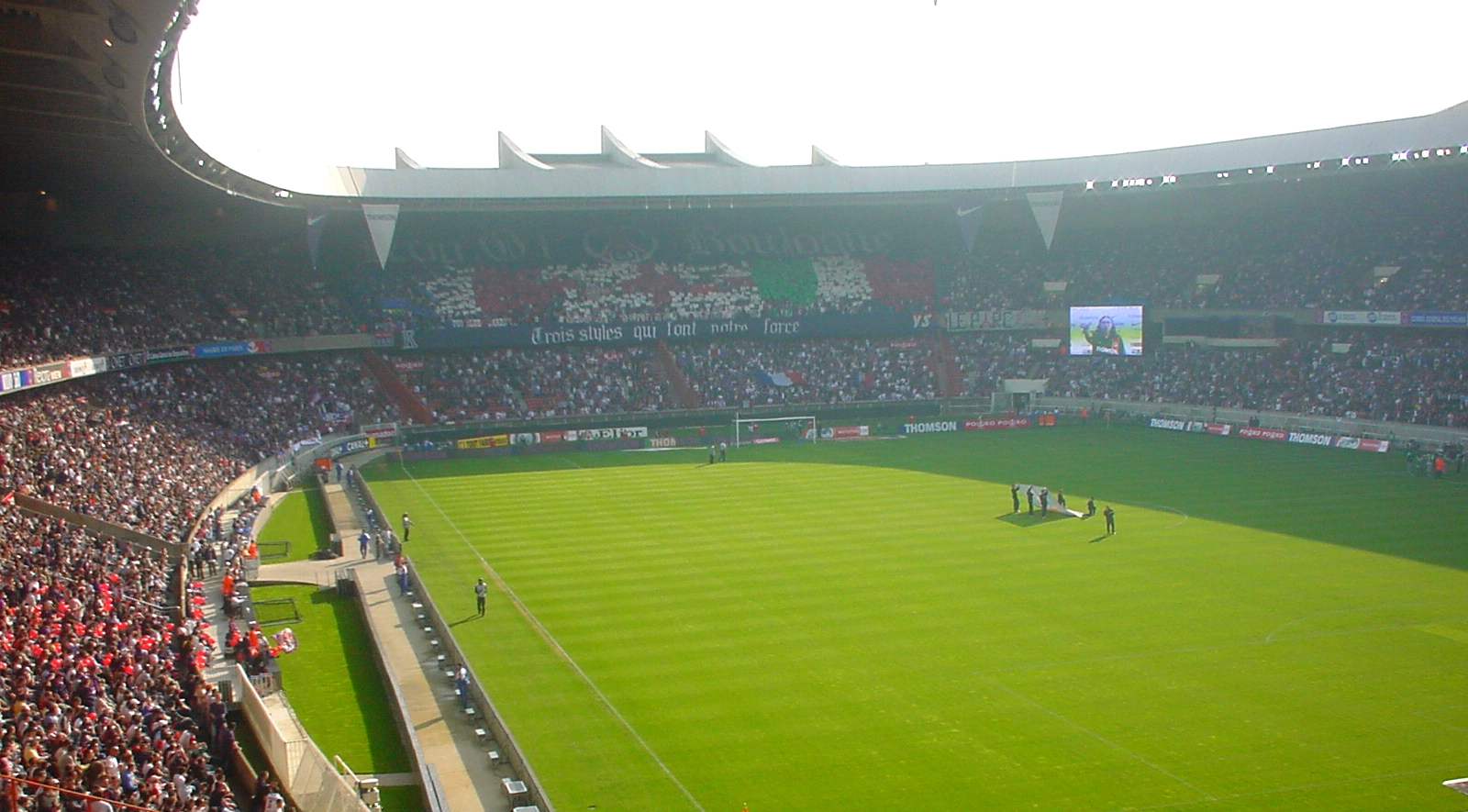
PSG tifo against OM at the Parc des Princes in April 2004.

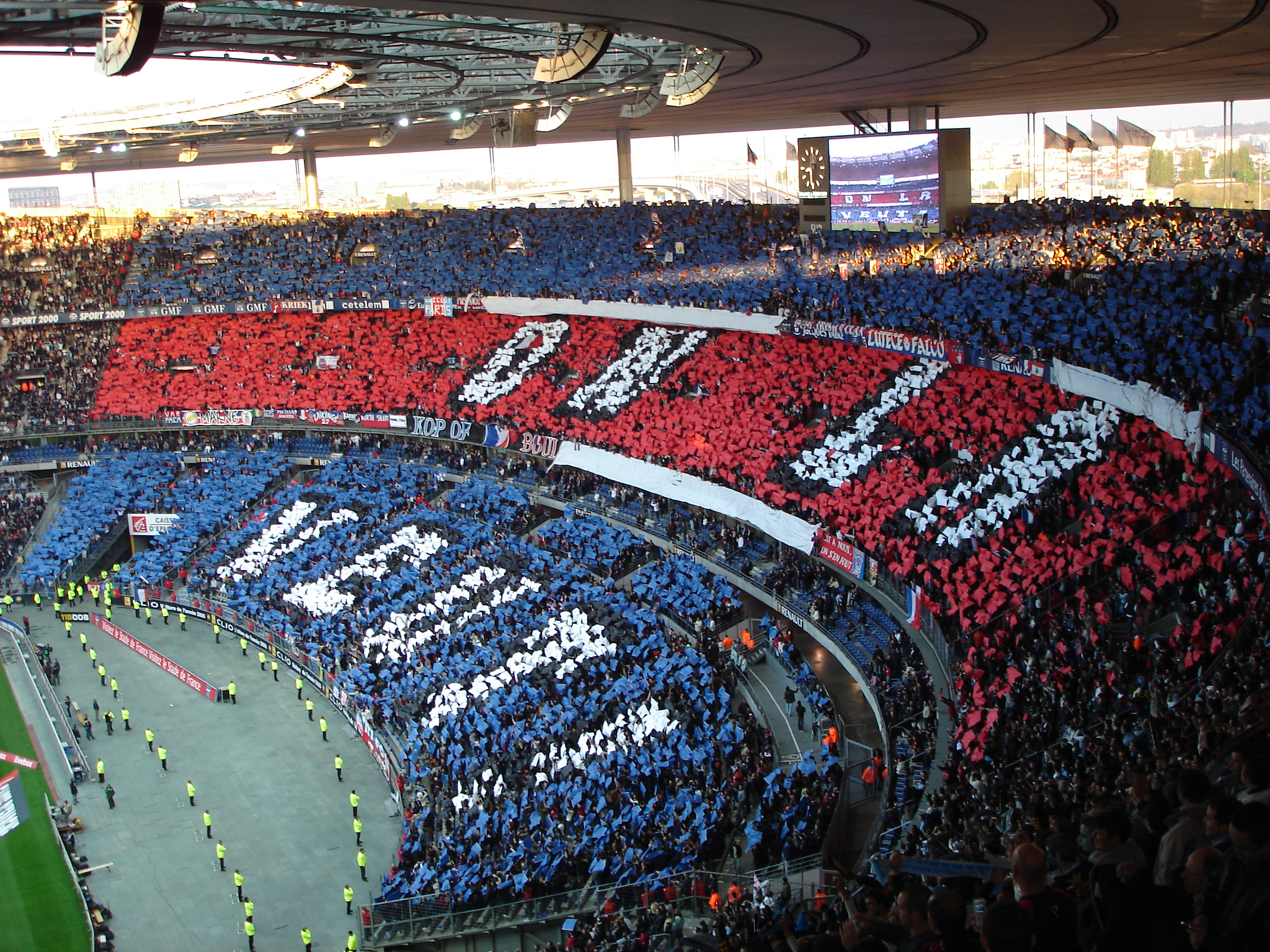
PSG tifo in the 2006 Coupe de France final at the Stade de France.

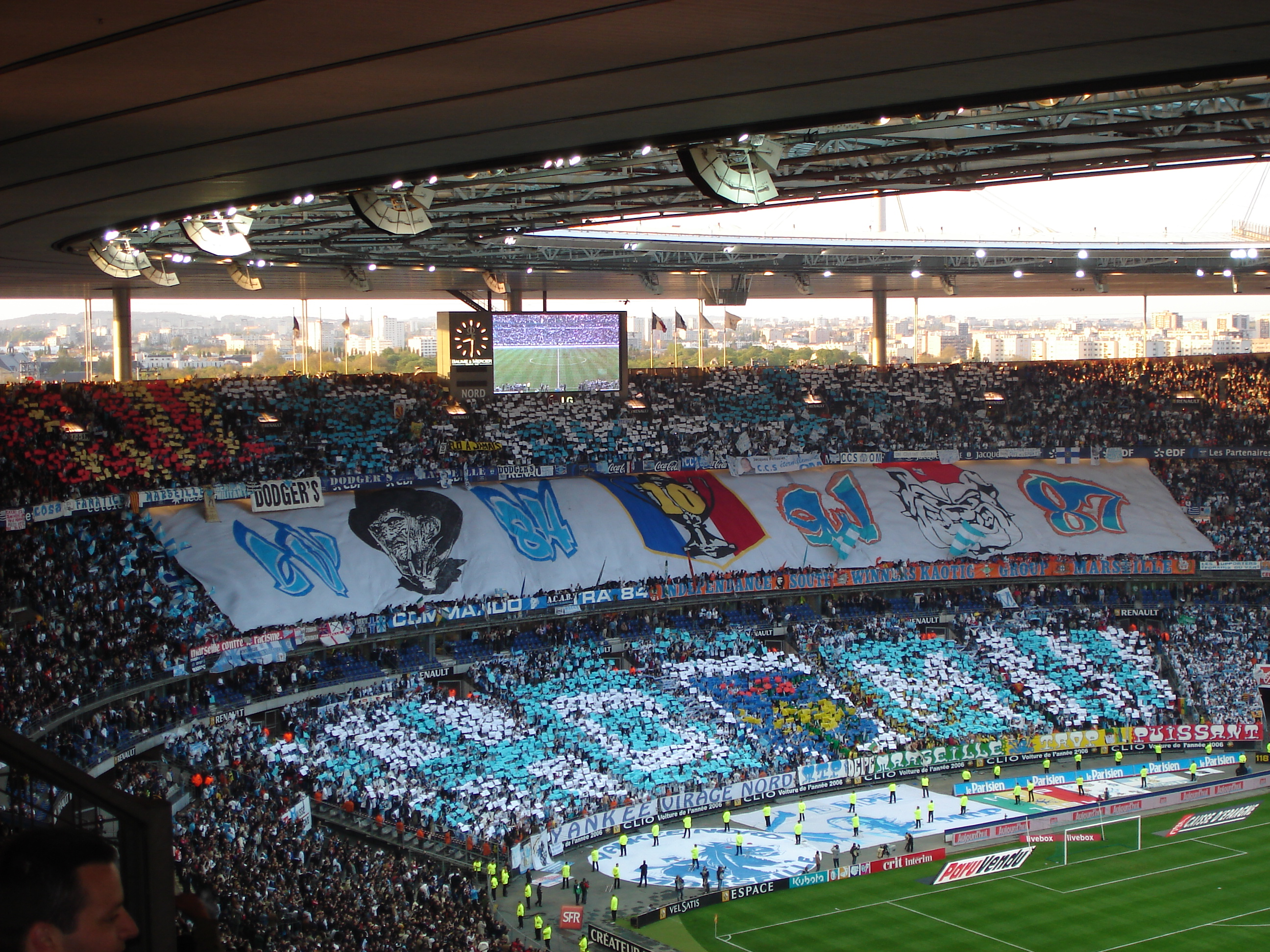
OM tifo in the 2006 Coupe de France final at the Stade de France.

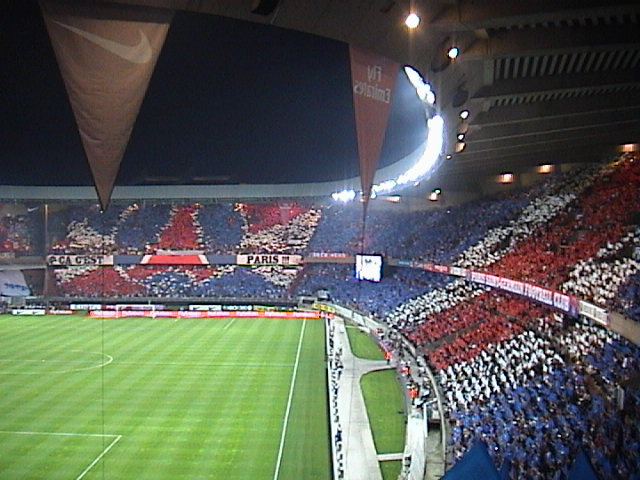
PSG tifo against OM at the Parc des Princes in September 2006.

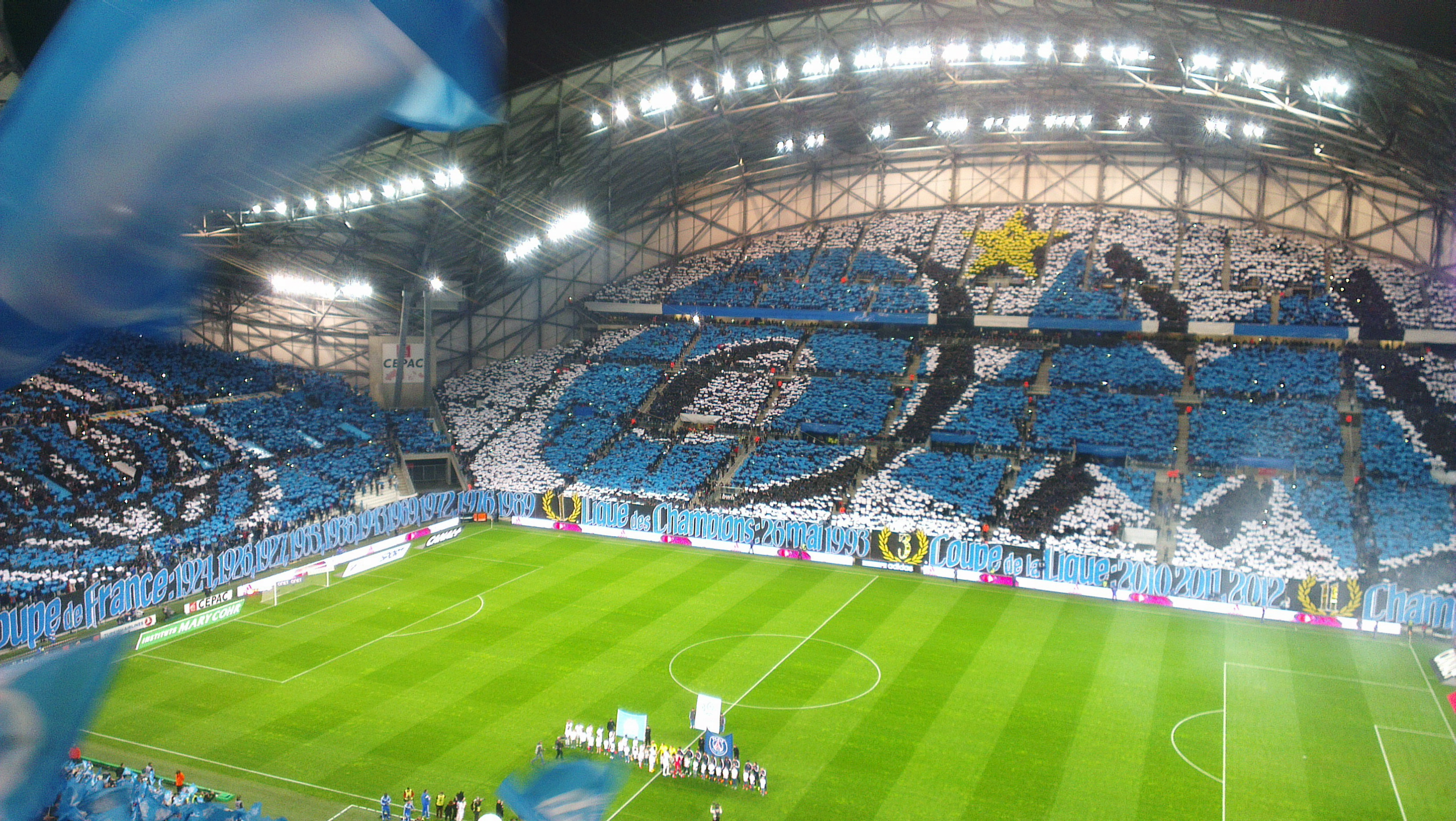
OM tifo against PSG at the Stade Vélodrome in April 2015.

== Statistics ==
As of 20 September 2026.

Paris Saint-Germain Olympique de Marseille Draw

=== Honours ===
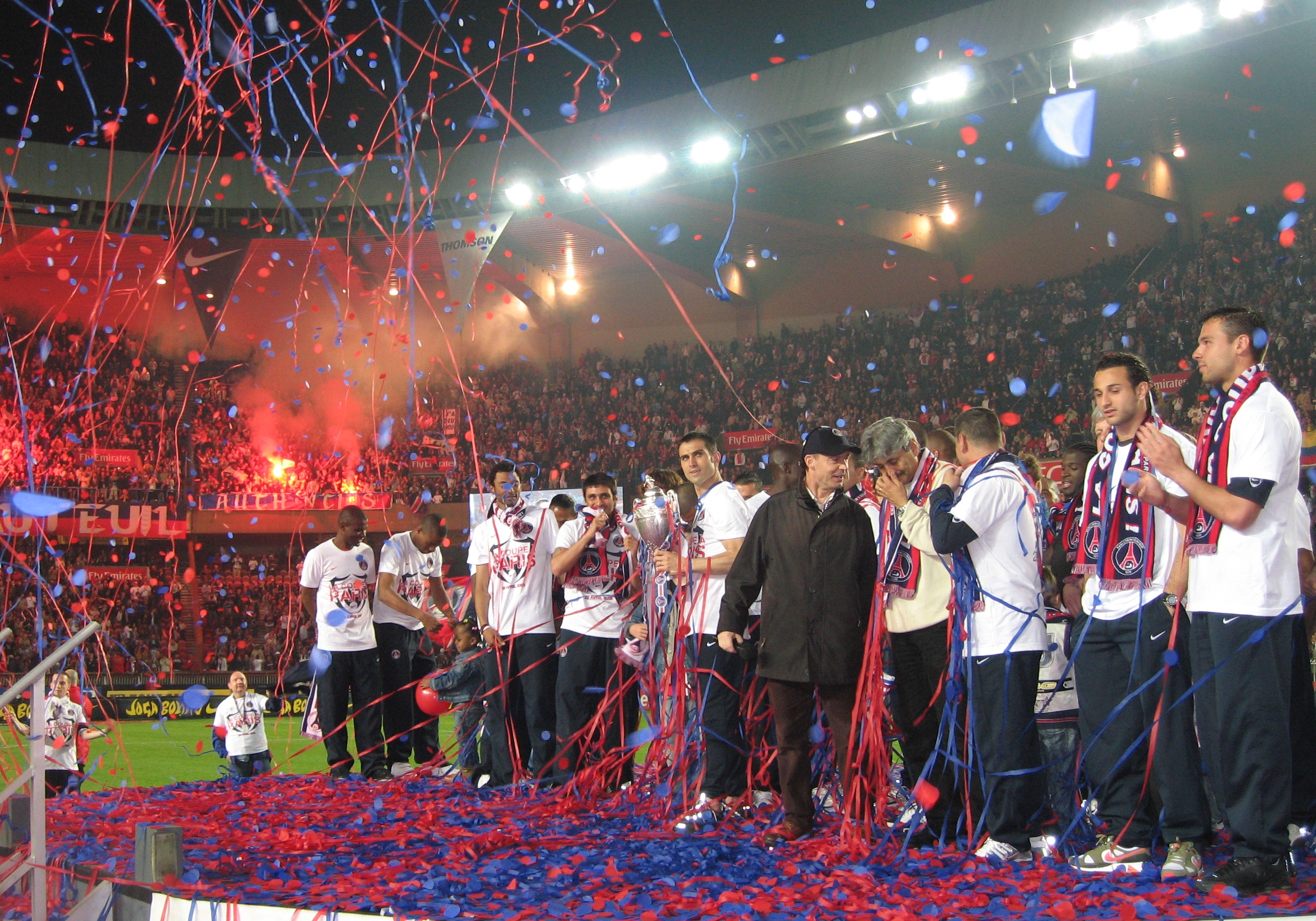
PSG players celebrate their 2–1 victory over Marseille in the 2006 Coupe de France final.

Competition	Titles won	
Competition	PSG	OM
Ligue 1	14	9
Ligue 2	1	1
Coupe de France	16	10
Coupe de la Ligue	9	3
Trophée des Champions	14	3
Coupe Charles Drago	0	1
National total	54	27
UEFA Champions League	2	1
UEFA Cup Winners' Cup	1	0
UEFA Intertoto Cup	1	1
UEFA Super Cup	2	0
FIFA Intercontinental Cup	1	0
International total	7	2
Overall total	61	29

=== Head-to-head ===
Competition	Matches	Wins		Draws	Goals		Goal difference	
Competition	Matches	PSG	OM	Draws	PSG	OM	PSG	OM
Ligue 1	94	41	33	20	137	108	+29	−29
Coupe de France	14	10	2	2	27	13	+14	−14
Coupe de la Ligue	2	2	0	0	5	2	+3	−3
Trophée des Champions	3	1	0	2	4	3	+1	−1
Total	113	54	35	24	173	126	+47	−47

== Matches ==
As of 20 September 2026.

Paris Saint-Germain Olympique de Marseille Draw

=== Ligue 1 ===
Ligue 1 matches

12 December 1971 Matchday 18	Marseille	4–2	Paris Saint-Germain	Marseille
	Bosquier 13'; Skoblar 18', 83'; Couécou 50'	Report	Prost 44', 73'	Stadium: Stade Vélodrome; Attendance: 18,798; Referee: Bernard Amiotte

17 May 1972 Matchday 36	Paris Saint-Germain	1–2	Marseille	Colombes
	Bras 60'	Report	Kula 2'; Novi 23'	Stadium: Stade Olympique Yves-du-Manoir; Attendance: 14,140; Referee: Pierre Coquerille

5 October 1974 Matchday 11	Marseille	4–2	Paris Saint-Germain	Marseille
	Skoblar 12', 39'; Eo 23'; Emon 48'	Report	Dahleb 11'; Dogliani 49'	Stadium: Stade Vélodrome; Attendance: 14,117; Referee: Michel Vautrot

12 March 1975 Matchday 29	Paris Saint-Germain	1–1	Marseille	Paris
	Dahleb 71'	Report	Jairzinho 90'	Stadium: Parc des Princes; Attendance: 42,247; Referee: Georges Konrath

20 September 1975 Matchday 7	Paris Saint-Germain	2–3	Marseille	Paris
	Dogliani 29'; Floch 88'	Report	Bracci 37'; Emon 70'; Yazalde 72'	Stadium: Parc des Princes; Attendance: 38,210; Referee: Achille Verbecke

22 February 1976 Matchday 25	Marseille	2–1	Paris Saint-Germain	Marseille
	Florès 66', 70'	Report	Floch 80'	Stadium: Stade Vélodrome; Attendance: 16,368; Referee: Georges Konrath

24 November 1976 Matchday 12	Marseille	2–1	Paris Saint-Germain	Marseille
	Bracci 32'; Zlatarić 89'	Report	Baulier 17' (o.g.)	Stadium: Stade Vélodrome; Attendance: 13,024; Referee: Jean-Claude Martin

16 April 1977 Matchday 30	Paris Saint-Germain	1–1	Marseille	Paris
	Tokoto 72'	Report	Florès 23'	Stadium: Parc des Princes; Attendance: 14,803; Referee: Achille Verbecke

30 August 1977 Matchday 5	Marseille	2–1	Paris Saint-Germain	Marseille
	Berdoll 35'; Florès 67'	Report	Bianchi 89' (pen.)	Stadium: Stade Vélodrome; Attendance: 24,303; Referee: Alain Delmer

8 January 1978 Matchday 23	Paris Saint-Germain	5–1	Marseille	Paris
	Brisson 29'; Dahleb 44'; Trésor 46' (o.g.); M'Pelé 49' (pen.), 82'	Report	Sarr 12' (pen.)	Stadium: Parc des Princes; Attendance: 33,386; Referee: Robert Wurtz

30 September 1978 Matchday 13	Marseille	4–1	Paris Saint-Germain	Marseille
	Linderoth 21'; Sarr 46'; Buigues 57'; Florès 86' (pen.)	Report	Bianchi 84'	Stadium: Stade Vélodrome; Attendance: 9,295; Referee: Alain Delmer

7 April 1979 Matchday 31	Paris Saint-Germain	4–3	Marseille	Paris
	Bureau 3'; Dahleb 55'; A. Bianchi 56' (pen.); C. Bianchi 86'	Report	Berdoll 2', 80'; Buigues 71'	Stadium: Parc des Princes; Attendance: 13,707; Referee: Achille Verbecke

3 August 1979 Matchday 2	Paris Saint-Germain	2–1	Marseille	Paris
	Abel Braga 54'; Bathenay 70'	Report 1 Report 2	Six 11'	Stadium: Parc des Princes; Attendance: 43,845; Referee: Daniel Lambert

8 December 1979 Matchday 20	Marseille	0–2	Paris Saint-Germain	Marseille
		Report	Sarr 46'; Beltramini 88'	Stadium: Stade Vélodrome; Attendance: 5,556; Referee: Michel Vautrot

8 September 1984 Matchday 6	Paris Saint-Germain	2–1	Marseille	Paris
	Bathenay 39'; N'Jo Léa 49'	Report	Zénier 50'	Stadium: Parc des Princes; Attendance: 21,820; Referee: Mohamed Benali

3 February 1985 Matchday 24	Marseille	3–1	Paris Saint-Germain	Marseille
	Flak 25'; La Ling 54', 61'	Report	Toko 46'	Stadium: Stade Vélodrome; Attendance: 19,878; Referee: Michel Vautrot

9 August 1985 Matchday 6	Paris Saint-Germain	2–0	Marseille	Paris
	Fernández 1'; Jacques 22'	Report		Stadium: Parc des Princes; Attendance: 32,460; Referee: Jean-Claude Swirog

15 December 1985 Matchday 24	Marseille	0–0	Paris Saint-Germain	Marseille
		Report		Stadium: Stade Vélodrome; Attendance: 37,058; Referee: Claude Bouillet

28 November 1986 Matchday 19	Marseille	4–0	Paris Saint-Germain	Marseille
	Laurey 11'; Cubaynes 38', 70'; Papin 79'	Report		Stadium: Stade Vélodrome; Attendance: 38,209; Referee: Claude Lopez

29 May 1987 Matchday 37	Paris Saint-Germain	2–0	Marseille	Paris
	Sène 82'; Sušić 90'	Report		Stadium: Parc des Princes; Attendance: 33,090; Referee: Alain Delmer

8 November 1987 Matchday 18	Paris Saint-Germain	1–1	Marseille	Paris
	Simba 45'	Report	Sène 17' (o.g.)	Stadium: Parc des Princes; Attendance: 22,250; Referee: Gérard Biguet

21 May 1988 Matchday 36	Marseille	1–2	Paris Saint-Germain	Marseille
	Papin 28'	Report	Sušić 23'; Calderón 86'	Stadium: Stade Vélodrome; Attendance: 21,084; Referee: Jean-Louis Rideau

29 October 1988 Matchday 17	Paris Saint-Germain	0–0	Marseille	Paris
		Report		Stadium: Parc des Princes; Attendance: 33,256; Referee: Claude Bouillet

5 May 1989 Matchday 35	Marseille	1–0	Paris Saint-Germain	Marseille
	Sauzée 90'	Report		Stadium: Stade Vélodrome; Attendance: 35,572; Referee: Michel Vautrot

27 October 1989 Matchday 16	Marseille	2–1	Paris Saint-Germain	Marseille
	Waddle 35'; Francescoli 87'	Report	Vujović 75'	Stadium: Stade Vélodrome; Attendance: 25,987; Referee: Michel Vautrot

21 April 1990 Matchday 34	Paris Saint-Germain	2–1	Marseille	Paris
	Calderón 43' (pen.); Vujović 83'	Report	Sauzée 17'	Stadium: Parc des Princes; Attendance: 40,025; Referee: Gérard Biguet

8 September 1990 Matchday 8	Marseille	2–1	Paris Saint-Germain	Marseille
	Waddle 11'; Cantona 18'	Report	Mozer 16' (o.g.)	Stadium: Stade Vélodrome; Attendance: 31,626; Referee: Michel Vautrot

10 February 1991 Matchday 26	Paris Saint-Germain	0–1	Marseille	Paris
		Report	Boli 71'	Stadium: Parc des Princes; Attendance: 38,766; Referee: Jean-Marie Lartigot

9 August 1991 Matchday 5	Marseille	0–0	Paris Saint-Germain	Marseille
		Report		Stadium: Stade Vélodrome; Attendance: 37,933; Referee: Claude Bouillet

17 December 1991 Matchday 23	Paris Saint-Germain	0–0	Marseille	Paris
		Report		Stadium: Parc des Princes; Attendance: 43,382; Referee: Alain Delmer

18 December 1992 Matchday 19	Paris Saint-Germain	0–1	Marseille	Paris
		Report 1 Report 2	Bokšić 21'	Stadium: Parc des Princes; Attendance: 42,509; Referee: Michel Girard

29 May 1993 Matchday 37	Marseille	3–1	Paris Saint-Germain	Marseille
	Völler 16'; Boli 38'; Bokšić 76'	Report 1 Report 2	Guérin 7'	Stadium: Stade Vélodrome; Attendance: 37,178; Referee: Didier Pauchard

15 August 1993 Matchday 5	Marseille	1–0	Paris Saint-Germain	Marseille
	Bokšić 87'	Report 1 Report 2		Stadium: Stade Vélodrome; Attendance: 33,700; Referee: Georges Ramos

14 January 1994 Matchday 23	Paris Saint-Germain	1–1	Marseille	Paris
	Guérin 11'	Report	Völler 14'	Stadium: Parc des Princes; Attendance: 38,884; Referee: Marcel Lainé

22 November 1996 Matchday 19	Paris Saint-Germain	0–0	Marseille	Paris
		Report		Stadium: Parc des Princes; Attendance: 44,804; Referee: Alain Sars

17 May 1997 Matchday 37	Marseille	1–0	Paris Saint-Germain	Marseille
	Roy 39' (pen.)	Report		Stadium: Stade Vélodrome; Attendance: 24,200; Referee: Alain Sars

8 November 1997 Matchday 15	Paris Saint-Germain	1–2	Marseille	Paris
	Leroy 33'	Report	Gravelaine 14'; Blanc 65' (pen.)	Stadium: Parc des Princes; Attendance: 43,307; Referee: Jean-Claude Puyalt

8 April 1998 Matchday 31	Marseille	0–0	Paris Saint-Germain	Marseille
		Report		Stadium: Stade Vélodrome; Attendance: 56,470; Referee: Stéphane Bré

29 November 1998 Matchday 16	Marseille	0–0	Paris Saint-Germain	Marseille
		Report		Stadium: Stade Vélodrome; Attendance: 56,346; Referee: Stéphane Bré

4 May 1999 Matchday 32	Paris Saint-Germain	2–1	Marseille	Paris
	Simone 84'; B. Rodriguez 88'	Report	Maurice 21'	Stadium: Parc des Princes; Attendance: 44,939; Referee: Alain Sars

12 October 1999 Matchday 10	Paris Saint-Germain	0–2	Marseille	Paris
		Report	Ravanelli 73'; Maurice 82'	Stadium: Parc des Princes; Attendance: 44,784; Referee: Éric Poulat

15 February 2000 Matchday 26	Marseille	4–1	Paris Saint-Germain	Marseille
	Pérez 24'; Pouget 59'; Abardonado 67'; Maurice 78'	Report	Christian 7'	Stadium: Stade Vélodrome; Attendance: 54,876; Referee: Éric Poulat

13 October 2000 Matchday 11	Paris Saint-Germain	2–0	Marseille	Paris
	Robert 62'; Christian 90'	Report		Stadium: Parc des Princes; Attendance: 44,084; Referee: Éric Poulat

17 February 2001 Matchday 27	Marseille	1–0	Paris Saint-Germain	Marseille
	Bakayoko 74'	Report		Stadium: Stade Vélodrome; Attendance: 56,315; Referee: Stéphane Bré

29 November 2001 Matchday 16	Paris Saint-Germain	0–0	Marseille	Paris
		Report		Stadium: Parc des Princes; Attendance: 42,178; Referee: Bertrand Layec

12 April 2002 Matchday 32	Marseille	1–0	Paris Saint-Germain	Marseille
	Van Buyten 64'	Report		Stadium: Stade Vélodrome; Attendance: 55,797; Referee: Laurent Duhamel

26 October 2002 Matchday 12	Paris Saint-Germain	3–0	Marseille	Paris
	Ronaldinho 15', 37' (pen.); Cardetti 81'	Report		Stadium: Parc des Princes; Attendance: 41,949; Referee: Éric Poulat

9 March 2003 Matchday 30	Marseille	0–3	Paris Saint-Germain	Marseille
		Report	Leroy 27', 84'; Ronaldinho 56'	Stadium: Stade Vélodrome; Attendance: 55,982; Referee: Bertrand Layec

30 November 2003 Matchday 15	Marseille	0–1	Paris Saint-Germain	Marseille
		Report	Fiorèse 89'	Stadium: Stade Vélodrome; Attendance: 55,493; Referee: Alain Sars

25 April 2004 Matchday 33	Paris Saint-Germain	2–1	Marseille	Paris
	Pauleta 12', 61'	Report	Batlles 89'	Stadium: Parc des Princes; Attendance: 41,978; Referee: Stéphane Bré

7 November 2004 Matchday 13	Paris Saint-Germain	2–1	Marseille	Paris
	Pauleta 32'; Cissé 70'	Report	Batlles 41'	Stadium: Parc des Princes; Attendance: 43,131; Referee: Gilles Veissière

3 April 2005 Matchday 31	Marseille	1–1	Paris Saint-Germain	Marseille
	Batlles 75'	Report	Nakata 46' (o.g.)	Stadium: Stade Vélodrome; Attendance: 56,087; Referee: Éric Poulat

16 October 2005 Matchday 11	Marseille	1–0	Paris Saint-Germain	Marseille
	Cana 79'	Report		Stadium: Stade Vélodrome; Attendance: 54,260; Referee: Éric Poulat

5 March 2006 Matchday 29	Paris Saint-Germain	0–0	Marseille	Paris
		Report		Stadium: Parc des Princes; Attendance: 43,906; Referee: Alain Sars

10 September 2006 Matchday 5	Paris Saint-Germain	1–3	Marseille	Paris
	Pauleta 22' (pen.)	Report	Niang 7' (pen.); Nasri 67'; Pagis 88'	Stadium: Parc des Princes; Attendance: 44,431; Referee: Stéphane Bré

4 February 2007 Matchday 23	Marseille	1–1	Paris Saint-Germain	Marseille
	Cissé 68'	Report	Pauleta 74'	Stadium: Stade Vélodrome; Attendance: 56,592; Referee: Bertrand Layec

2 September 2007 Matchday 7	Paris Saint-Germain	1–1	Marseille	Paris
	Luyindula 20'	Report	Cissé 10'	Stadium: Parc des Princes; Attendance: 43,419; Referee: Stéphane Lannoy

17 February 2008 Matchday 25	Marseille	2–1	Paris Saint-Germain	Marseille
	Taiwo 37'; Niang 45'	Report	Rothen 29' (pen.)	Stadium: Stade Vélodrome; Attendance: 56,863; Referee: Bertrand Layec

26 October 2008 Matchday 10	Marseille	2–4	Paris Saint-Germain	Marseille
	Niang 21'; Valbuena 45'	Report	Hoarau 9', 82'; Luyindula 53'; Rothen 76'	Stadium: Stade Vélodrome; Attendance: 56,426; Referee: Laurent Duhamel

15 March 2009 Matchday 28	Paris Saint-Germain	1–3	Marseille	Paris
	Giuly 43'	Report	Zenden 24'; Cana 61'; Koné 55'	Stadium: Parc des Princes; Attendance: 45,774; Referee: Bertrand Layec

20 November 2009 Matchday 10	Marseille	1–0	Paris Saint-Germain	Marseille
	Heinze 25'	Report		Stadium: Stade Vélodrome; Attendance: 55,623; Referee: Laurent Duhamel

28 February 2010 Matchday 26	Paris Saint-Germain	0–3	Marseille	Paris
		Report	Ben Arfa 15'; Lucho González 54'; Cheyrou 71'	Stadium: Parc des Princes; Attendance: 43,813; Referee: Antony Gautier

7 November 2010 Matchday 12	Paris Saint-Germain	2–1	Marseille	Paris
	Erdinç 9'; Hoarau 19'	Report	Lucho González 23'	Stadium: Parc des Princes; Attendance: 40,234; Referee: Stéphane Lannoy

20 March 2011 Matchday 28	Marseille	2–1	Paris Saint-Germain	Marseille
	Heinze 16'; Ayew 35'	Report	Chantôme 26'	Stadium: Stade Vélodrome; Attendance: 52,792; Referee: Stéphane Bré

27 November 2011 Matchday 15	Marseille	3–0	Paris Saint-Germain	Marseille
	Rémy 9'; Amalfitano 65'; A. Ayew 83'	Report		Stadium: Stade Vélodrome; Attendance: 41,512; Referee: Lionel Jaffredo

8 April 2012 Matchday 31	Paris Saint-Germain	2–1	Marseille	Paris
	Ménez 6'; Alex 61'	Report 1 Report 2	Ayew 60'	Stadium: Parc des Princes; Attendance: 46,252; Referee: Antony Gautier

7 October 2012 Matchday 8	Marseille	2–2	Paris Saint-Germain	Marseille
	Gignac 18', 32'	Report	Ibrahimović 23', 25'	Stadium: Stade Vélodrome; Attendance: 40,748; Referee: Tony Chapron

24 February 2013 Matchday 26	Paris Saint-Germain	2–0	Marseille	Paris
	N'Koulou 12' (o.g.); Ibrahimović 90'	Report		Stadium: Parc des Princes; Attendance: 44,984; Referee: Fredy Fautrel

6 October 2013 Matchday 9	Marseille	1–2	Paris Saint-Germain	Marseille
	Ayew 34' (pen.)	Report	Maxwell 45'; Ibrahimović 66' (pen.)	Stadium: Stade Vélodrome; Attendance: 44,391; Referee: Clément Turpin

2 March 2014 Matchday 27	Paris Saint-Germain	2–0	Marseille	Paris
	Maxwell 50'; Cavani 79'	Report		Stadium: Parc des Princes; Attendance: 45,483; Referee: Ruddy Buquet

9 November 2014 Matchday 13	Paris Saint-Germain	2–0	Marseille	Paris
	Lucas Moura 38'; Cavani 85'	Report		Stadium: Parc des Princes; Attendance: 45,961; Referee: Clément Turpin

5 April 2015 Matchday 31	Marseille	2–3	Paris Saint-Germain	Marseille
	Gignac 30', 43'	Report	Matuidi 35'; Marquinhos 49'; Morel 51' (o.g.)	Stadium: Stade Vélodrome; Attendance: 65,148; Referee: Ruddy Buquet

4 October 2015 Matchday 9	Paris Saint-Germain	2–1	Marseille	Paris
	Ibrahimović 41' (pen.), 44' (pen.)	Report	Batshuayi 30'	Stadium: Parc des Princes; Attendance: 47,199; Referee: Benoît Bastien

7 February 2016 Matchday 25	Marseille	1–2	Paris Saint-Germain	Marseille
	Cabella 25'	Report	Ibrahimović 2'; Di María 71'	Stadium: Stade Vélodrome; Attendance: 61,166; Referee: Ruddy Buquet

23 October 2016 Matchday 10	Paris Saint-Germain	0–0	Marseille	Paris
		Report		Stadium: Parc des Princes; Attendance: 47,929; Referee: Clément Turpin

26 February 2017 Matchday 27	Marseille	1–5	Paris Saint-Germain	Marseille
	Fanni 69'	Report	Marquinhos 6'; Cavani 16'; Lucas Moura 50'; Draxler 61'; Matuidi 72'	Stadium: Stade Vélodrome; Attendance: 65,252; Referee: Benoît Bastien

22 October 2017 Matchday 10	Marseille	2–2	Paris Saint-Germain	Marseille
	Luiz Gustavo 16'; Thauvin 79'	Report	Neymar 34'; Cavani 90+3'	Stadium: Stade Vélodrome; Attendance: 60,410; Referee: Ruddy Buquet

25 February 2018 Matchday 27	Paris Saint-Germain	3–0	Marseille	Paris
	Mbappé 10'; Rolando 28' (o.g.); Cavani 55'	Report		Stadium: Parc des Princes; Attendance: 47,490; Referee: Benoît Bastien

28 October 2018 Matchday 11	Marseille	0–2	Paris Saint-Germain	Marseille
		Report	Mbappé 65'; Draxler 90+5'	Stadium: Stade Vélodrome; Attendance: 64,696; Referee: Benoît Bastien

17 March 2019 Matchday 29	Paris Saint-Germain	3–1	Marseille	Paris
	Mbappé 45+2'; Di María 55', 66'	Report	Germain 46'	Stadium: Parc des Princes; Attendance: 47,647; Referee: Antony Gautier

27 October 2019 Matchday 11	Paris Saint-Germain	4–0	Marseille	Paris
	Icardi 10', 26'; Mbappé 32', 44'	Report		Stadium: Parc des Princes; Attendance: 47,926; Referee: Benoît Bastien

22 March 2020 Matchday 30	Marseille	Cancelled	Paris Saint-Germain	Marseille
		COVID-19 pandemic		Stadium: Stade Vélodrome

13 September 2020 Matchday 3	Paris Saint-Germain	0–1	Marseille	Paris
		Report 1 Report 2	Thauvin 31'	Stadium: Parc des Princes; Attendance: 3,904; Referee: Jérôme Brisard

7 February 2021 Matchday 24	Marseille	0–2	Paris Saint-Germain	Marseille
		Report	Mbappé 9'; Icardi 24'	Stadium: Stade Vélodrome; Attendance: Behind closed doors Referee: Benoît Bastien

24 October 2021 Matchday 11	Marseille	0–0	Paris Saint-Germain	Marseille
		Report		Stadium: Stade Vélodrome; Attendance: 65,121; Referee: Benoît Bastien

17 April 2022 Matchday 32	Paris Saint-Germain	2–1	Marseille	Paris
	Neymar 12'; Mbappé 45+5' (pen.)	Report 1 Report 2	Ćaleta-Car 31'	Stadium: Parc des Princes; Attendance: 46,000; Referee: François Letexier

16 October 2022 Matchday 11	Paris Saint-Germain	1–0	Marseille	Paris
	Neymar 45+2'	Report		Stadium: Parc des Princes; Attendance: 47,000; Referee: Clément Turpin

26 February 2023 Matchday 25	Marseille	0–3	Paris Saint-Germain	Marseille
		Report	Mbappé 25', 55'; Messi 29'	Stadium: Stade Vélodrome; Attendance: 65,894; Referee: Clément Turpin

24 September 2023 Matchday 6	Paris Saint-Germain	4–0	Marseille	Paris
	Hakimi 8'; Kolo Muani 37'; Ramos 47', 89'	Report		Stadium: Parc des Princes; Attendance: 47,926; Referee: Willy Delajod

31 March 2024 Matchday 27	Marseille	0–2	Paris Saint-Germain	Marseille
		Report	Vitinha 53'; Ramos 86'	Stadium: Stade Vélodrome; Attendance: 66,046; Referee: Benoît Bastien

27 October 2024 Matchday 9	Marseille	0–3	Paris Saint-Germain	Marseille
		Report	Neves 7'; Balerdi 29' (o.g.); Barcola 40'	Stadium: Stade Vélodrome; Attendance: 66,115; Referee: François Letexier

16 March 2025 Matchday 26	Paris Saint-Germain	3–1	Marseille	Paris
	Dembélé 17'; Mendes 42'; Lirola 76' (o.g.)	Report	Gouiri 51'	Stadium: Parc des Princes; Attendance: 47,926; Referee: Clément Turpin

22 September 2025 Matchday 5	Marseille	1–0	Paris Saint-Germain	Marseille
	Marquinhos 5' (o.g.)	Report		Stadium: Stade Vélodrome; Attendance: 66,190; Referee: Jérôme Brisard

8 February 2026 Matchday 21	Paris Saint-Germain	5–0	Marseille	Paris
	Dembélé 12', 37'; Medina 64' (o.g.); Kvaratskhelia 66'; Lee 74'	Report		Stadium: Parc des Princes; Attendance: 47,926; Referee: Willy Delajod

20 September 2026 Matchday 5	Marseille	1–2	Paris Saint-Germain	Marseille
	Gomes 72'	Report	Torres 66'; Marquinhos 74'	Stadium: Stade Vélodrome; Attendance: 61,499; Referee: François Letexier

7 February 2027 Matchday 19	Paris Saint-Germain	v	Marseille	Paris
				Stadium: Parc des Princes

=== Coupe de France ===
Coupe de France matches

9 May 1975 Quarter-finals	Marseille	2–2	Paris Saint-Germain	Marseille
	Bereta 54'; Jairzinho 56'	Report	M'Pelé 60' (pen.), 70'	Stadium: Stade Vélodrome; Attendance: 26,595; Referee: Jean-Claude Martin

13 May 1975 Quarter-finals	Paris Saint-Germain	2–0 (4–2 agg.)	Marseille	Paris
	Floch 24'; Laposte 86'	Report		Stadium: Parc des Princes; Attendance: 46,471; Referee: Georges Konrath

30 March 1982 Round of 16	Marseille	0–1	Paris Saint-Germain	Marseille
		Report	Fernández 78'	Stadium: Stade Vélodrome; Attendance: 35,095; Referee: Georges Konrath

6 April 1982 Round of 16	Paris Saint-Germain	3–1 (4–1 agg.)	Marseille	Paris
	Šurjak 6'; N'Gom 15'; Rocheteau 71'	Report	Santos Muntubile 90'	Stadium: Parc des Princes; Attendance: 18,108; Referee: Ottorino Di Bernardo

28 April 1991 Round of 16	Paris Saint-Germain	0–2	Marseille	Paris
		Report 1 Report 2	Fournier 45'; Papin 54' (pen.)	Stadium: Parc des Princes; Attendance: 38,000; Referee: Marcel Lainé

11 April 1995 Semi-finals	Paris Saint-Germain	2–0	Marseille	Paris
	Ricardo 4'; Weah 34'	Report 1 Report 2		Stadium: Parc des Princes; Attendance: 43,211; Referee: Didier Pauchard

10 February 2002 Round of 16	Paris Saint-Germain	1–1 (a.e.t.) (7–6 p)	Marseille	Paris
	Heinze 85'	Report 1 Report 2	Van Buyten 67'	Stadium: Parc des Princes; Attendance: 33,790; Referee: Alain Sars
	Penalties
	Déhu (penalty scored); Hugo Leal (penalty missed); Aloísio (penalty scored); Alex Dias (penalty missed); Ronaldinho (penalty scored); Heinze (penalty scored); Leroy (penalty scored); Fiorèse (penalty scored); El Karkouri (penalty scored)		(penalty missed) Delfim; (penalty missed) Dalmat; (penalty scored) André Luiz; (penalty scored) Tuzzio; (penalty scored) Alfonso; (penalty scored) Bakayoko; (penalty scored) Jurietti; (penalty scored) Dos Santos; (penalty missed) Van Buyten

25 January 2003 Round of 32	Paris Saint-Germain	2–1 (a.e.t.)	Marseille	Paris
	Pochettino 14'; Fiorèse 102'	Report 1 Report 2	Van Buyten 62'	Stadium: Parc des Princes; Attendance: 38,150; Referee: Stéphane Bré

24 January 2004 Round of 32	Marseille	1–2 (a.e.t.)	Paris Saint-Germain	Marseille
	Drogba 35'	Report	Pauleta 10'; Sorín 103'	Stadium: Stade Vélodrome; Attendance: 54,000; Referee: Éric Poulat

29 April 2006 Final	Marseille	1–2	Paris Saint-Germain	Saint-Denis
	Maoulida 67'	Report	Kalou 6'; Dhorasoo 49'	Stadium: Stade de France; Attendance: 79,061; Referee: Laurent Duhamel

27 February 2013 Round of 16	Paris Saint-Germain	2–0	Marseille	Paris
	Ibrahimović 34', 63' (pen.)	Report		Stadium: Parc des Princes; Attendance: 42,000; Referee: Stéphane Lannoy

21 May 2016 Final	Marseille	2–4	Paris Saint-Germain	Saint-Denis
	Thauvin 12'; Batshuayi 87'	Report	Matuidi 2'; Ibrahimović 47' (pen.), 82'; Cavani 57'	Stadium: Stade de France; Attendance: 80,000; Referee: Clément Turpin

28 February 2018 Quarter-finals	Paris Saint-Germain	3–0	Marseille	Paris
	Di María 45', 48'; Cavani 80'	Report		Stadium: Parc des Princes; Attendance: 46,017; Referee: Clément Turpin

8 February 2023 Round of 16	Marseille	2–1	Paris Saint-Germain	Marseille
	Sánchez 31' (pen.); Malinovskyi 57'	Report	Ramos 45+2'	Stadium: Stade Vélodrome; Attendance: 65,329; Referee: François Letexier

=== Coupe de la Ligue ===
Coupe de la Ligue matches

10 November 2004 Second round	Marseille	2–3	Paris Saint-Germain	Marseille
	Pedretti 38'; Bamogo 41' (pen.)	Report	Bošković 45', 53'; Bernard Mendy 89'	Stadium: Stade Vélodrome; Attendance: 54,281; Referee: Stéphane Bré

31 October 2012 Round of 16	Paris Saint-Germain	2–0	Marseille	Paris
	Thiago Silva 29' (pen.); Ménez 50'	Report		Stadium: Parc des Princes; Attendance: 43,753; Referee: Antony Gautier

=== Trophée des Champions ===
Trophée des Champions matches

28 July 2010 Final	Marseille	0–0 (5–4 p)	Paris Saint-Germain	Tunis, Tunisia
		Report 1 Report 2		Stadium: Stade Olympique Hammadi Agrebi; Attendance: 56,237; Referee: Aouaz Trabelsi
	Penalties
	Taiwo (penalty scored); Ben Arfa (penalty scored); Lucho González (penalty missed); Kaboré (penalty scored); Gnabouyou (penalty scored); Cissé (penalty scored)		(penalty missed) Luyindula; (penalty scored) Jallet; (penalty scored) Nenê; (penalty scored) Kežman; (penalty scored) Makélélé; (penalty missed) Giuly

13 January 2021 Final	Paris Saint-Germain	2–1	Marseille	Lens
	Icardi 39'; Neymar 85' (pen.)	Report	Payet 89'	Stadium: Stade Bollaert-Delelis; Attendance: Behind closed doors Referee: Ruddy Buquet

8 January 2026 Final	Paris Saint-Germain	2–2 (4–1 p)	Marseille	Kuwait City, Kuwait
	Dembélé 13'; Ramos 90+5'	Report	Greenwood 76' (pen.); Pacho 87' (o.g.)	Stadium: Jaber Al-Ahmad International Stadium; Attendance: 52,215; Referee: Thomas Léonard
	Penalties
	Ramos (penalty scored); Vitinha (penalty scored); Mendes (penalty scored); Doué (penalty scored)		(penalty missed) O'Riley; (penalty missed) Traorè; (penalty scored) Murillo

== Records ==
As of 20 September 2026.

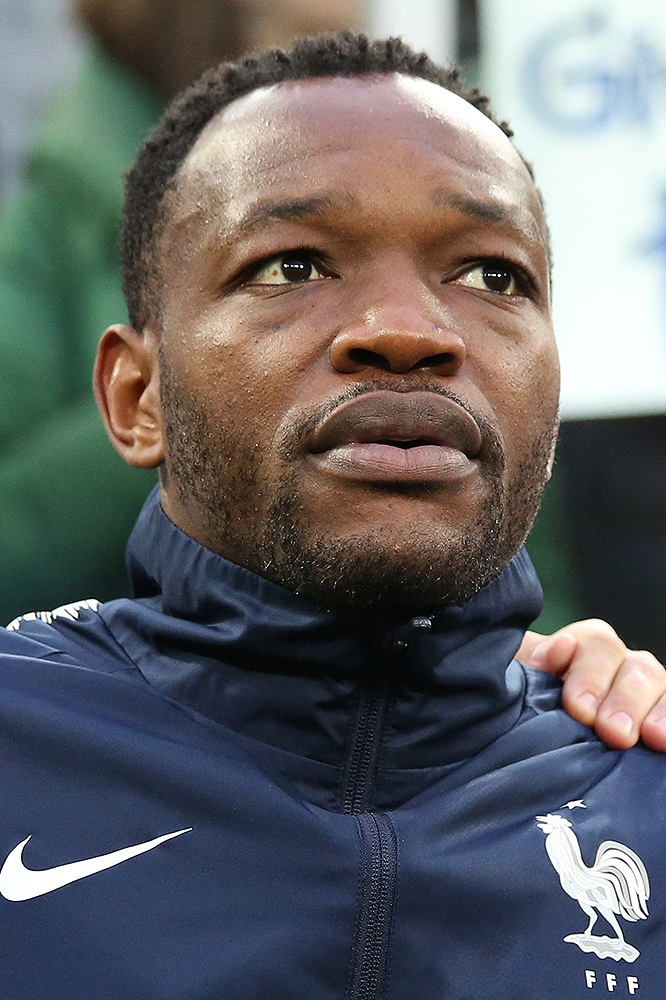
Steve Mandanda

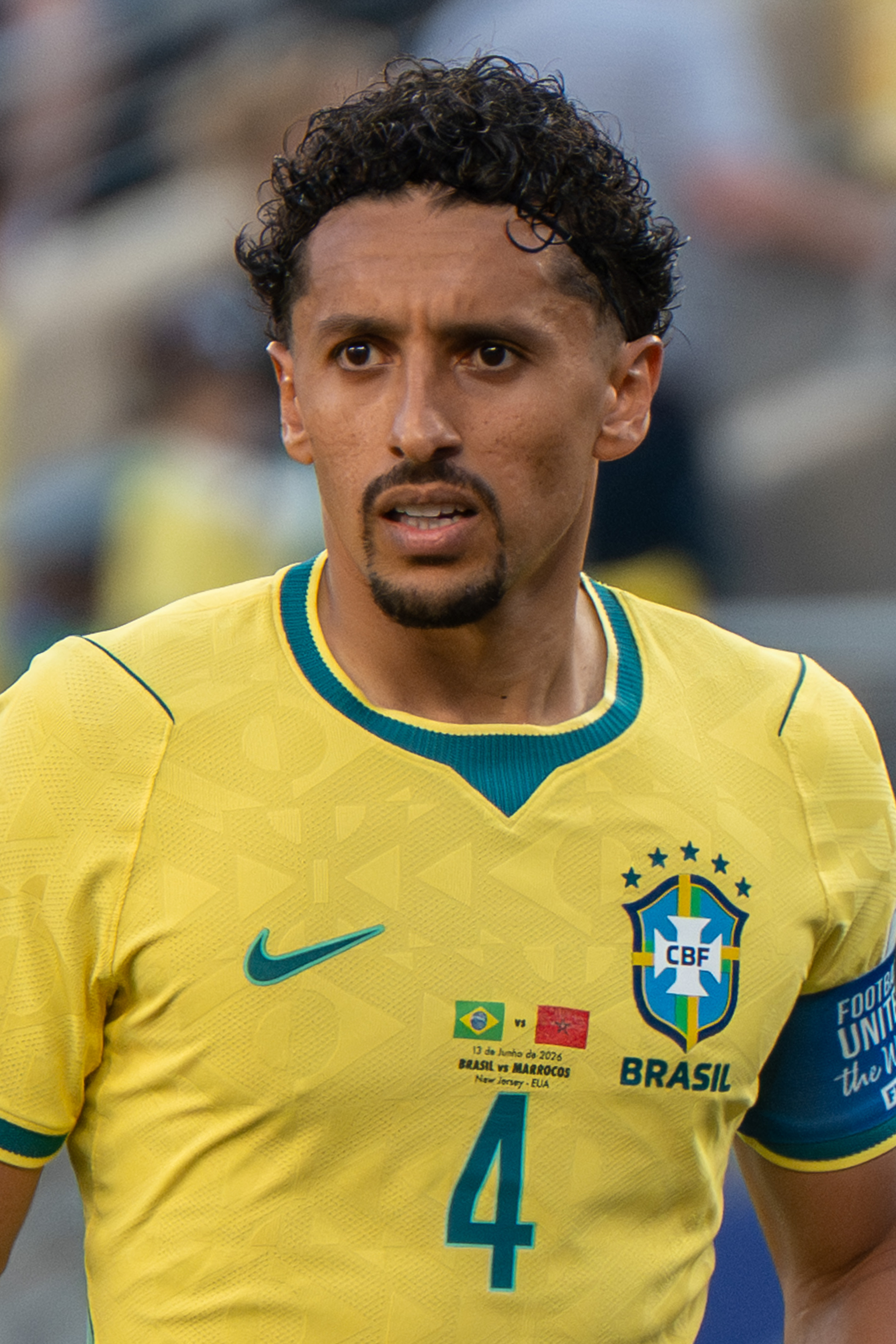
Marquinhos

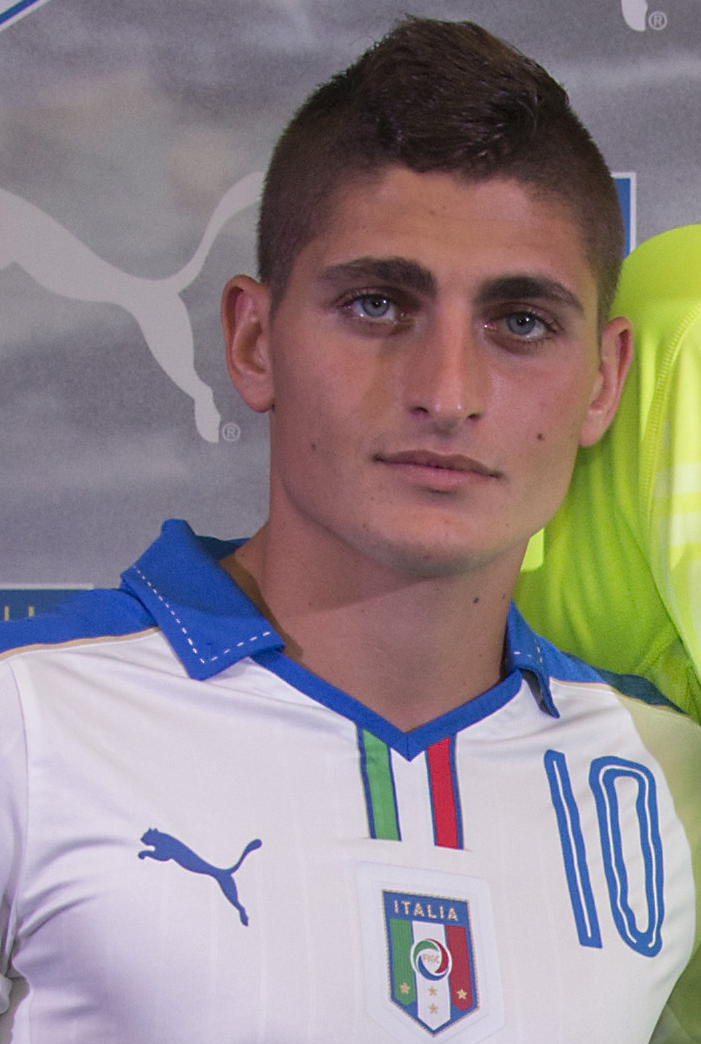
Marco Verratti

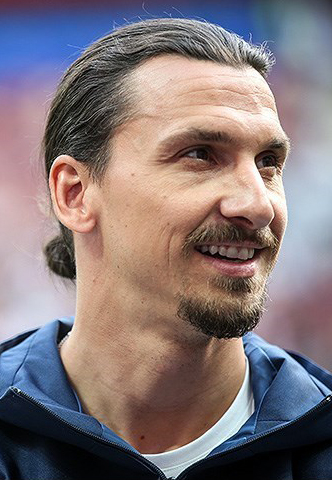
Zlatan Ibrahimović

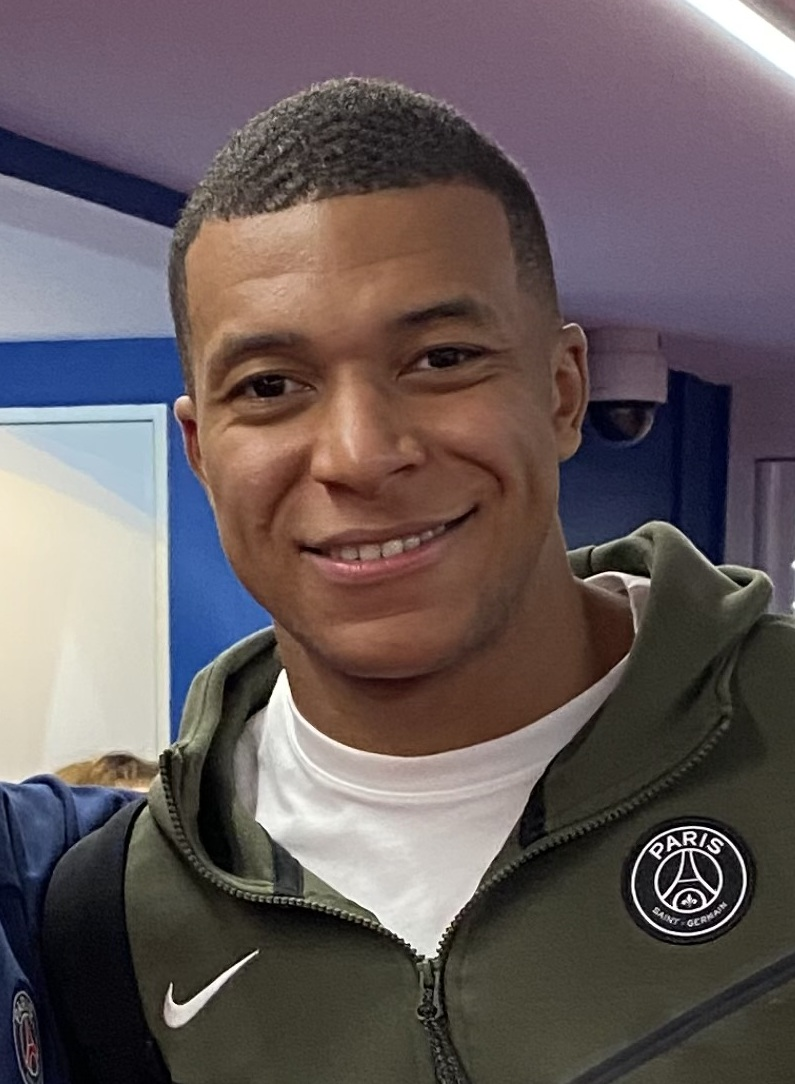
Kylian Mbappé

Paris Saint-Germain Olympique de Marseille Draw

=== Most appearances ===
Rank	Player	Position	Club	Period	Apps
1	(France) Steve Mandanda	GK	OM	2007–2016; 2017–2022	30
2	(Brazil) Marquinhos	DF	PSG	2013–	26
3	(Italy) Marco Verratti	MF	PSG	2012–2023	22
4	(France) Sylvain Armand	DF	PSG	2004–2013	18
5	(France) Jean-Marc Pilorget	DF	PSG	1975–1989	16
5	(France) Édouard Cissé	MF	PSG	1997–2007	16
5	(France) Édouard Cissé	MF	OM	2009–2011	16

=== Top goalscorers ===
Rank	Player	Position	Club	Period	Goals
1	(Sweden) Zlatan Ibrahimović	FW	PSG	2012–2016	11
2	(France) Kylian Mbappé	FW	PSG	2017–2024	9
3	(Uruguay) Edinson Cavani	FW	PSG	2013–2020	7
4	(Portugal) Pauleta	FW	PSG	2003–2008	6
5	(France) Hervé Florès	FW	OM	1975–1981	5
5	(Argentina) Ángel Di María	MF	PSG	2015–2022	5

=== Biggest wins ===
Date	Competition	Home team	Result	Away team	Margin
8 February 2026	Ligue 1	PSG	5–0	OM	5 goals
26 February 2017	Ligue 1	OM	1–5	PSG	4 goals
28 November 1986	Ligue 1	OM	4–0	PSG	4 goals
28 February 2010	Ligue 1	PSG	0–3	OM	3 goals

=== Highest-scoring matches ===
Rank	Date	Competition	Home team	Result	Away team	Goals
1	7 April 1979	Ligue 1	PSG	4–3	OM	7
2	12 December 1971	Ligue 1	OM	4–2	PSG	6
2	5 October 1974	Ligue 1	OM	4–2	PSG	6
2	8 January 1978	Ligue 1	PSG	5–1	OM	6
2	26 October 2008	Ligue 1	OM	2–4	PSG	6
2	21 May 2016	Coupe de France	OM	2–4	PSG	6
2	26 February 2017	Ligue 1	OM	1–5	PSG	6

=== Longest winning runs ===
Rank	Club	From	To	Wins
1	PSG	31 October 2012	21 May 2016	10
2	PSG	26 October 2002	10 November 2004	8
3	PSG	7 April 1979	8 September 1984	6
4	PSG	25 February 2018	27 October 2019	5
5	PSG	26 February 2023	16 March 2025	5
6	OM	15 March 2009	28 February 2010	3

=== Longest unbeaten runs ===
Rank	Club	From	To	Wins	Draws	Matches
1	PSG	8 April 2012	27 October 2019	17	3	20
2	PSG	26 October 2002	3 April 2005	8	1	9
2	OM	8 September 1990	14 January 1994	6	3	9
3	PSG	7 April 1979	8 September 1984	6	0	6

=== Highest attendances ===
Home team	Date	Competition	Stadium	Attendance
Neutral	21 May 2016	Coupe de France	Stade de France	80,000
OM	22 September 2025	Ligue 1	Stade Vélodrome	66,190
PSG	23 October 2016	Ligue 1	Parc des Princes	47,929

== Playing for both clubs ==
Despite the intensity of the rivalry, as many as 52 players have represented both clubs. Only two managers, Lucien Leduc and Tomislav Ivić, have coached both teams. Transfers between PSG and Marseille began attracting significant attention in the early 1990s, when the clubs emerged as arch-rivals. Jocelyn Angloma became the first high-profile player to cross the divide, leaving PSG in 1990 in exchange for Marseille's Bernard Pardo, Bruno Germain, and Laurent Fournier. The next major wave occurred in 2000, when PSG signed Peter Luccin and Stéphane Dalmat from OM, strengthening their squad ahead of the 2000–01 UEFA Champions League; these remain the two most expensive transfers between the two sides.

OM responded by signing PSG captain Frédéric Déhu and popular players Fabrice Fiorèse, Lorik Cana, and Modeste M'bami. Déhu's free transfer to Marseille was announced just days before the 2004 Coupe de France final; he was jeered by PSG supporters throughout the match and left the pitch in tears after lifting the trophy. Fiorèse joined shortly afterward, stating that OM had always been his dream club. Cana signed for Marseille in 2005, describing it as "the club of my heart," while M'Bami moved in 2006 despite previously asserting he would never play for OM. Upon returning to the Parc des Princes, all four players were jeered by PSG fans, who displayed banners reading: "We have Jesus (alongside a portrait of PSG defender Mario Yepes), you have Judas (Fiorèse)" and "Déhu, Fiorèse, Cana, M'Bami, the list of whores keeps growing."

PSG found solace in Peguy Luyindula, who transferred from OM in 2007, describing the move as the fulfillment of a lifelong ambition. To date, this remains the last direct transfer between the two clubs. Similarly, Gabriel Heinze, idolized in Paris, had declared in 2005 that he loved PSG and would only play for them if he returned to France. However, in 2009, Heinze ultimately signed for Marseille at the last minute. PSG supporters greeted his return to the Parc des Princes with insults, whistles, and hostile banners.

The transfer rivalry between PSG and OM has since subsided, with Qatar-backed PSG able to sign virtually any player worldwide, while Marseille have generally focused on more modest targets. Nonetheless, hostility toward certain players has persisted. In March 2025, former PSG Academy graduate and first-team player Adrien Rabiot returned to the Parc des Princes as Marseille captain. PSG ultras directed heavy abuse at him, as well as his mother and agent, Véronique Rabiot, displaying a banner at the start of the second half that read: "Loyalty for men, betrayal for whores. Like father, like son. Véro, who's his real father? Déhu, Fiorèse, Cana or Heinze?"

=== List of players ===
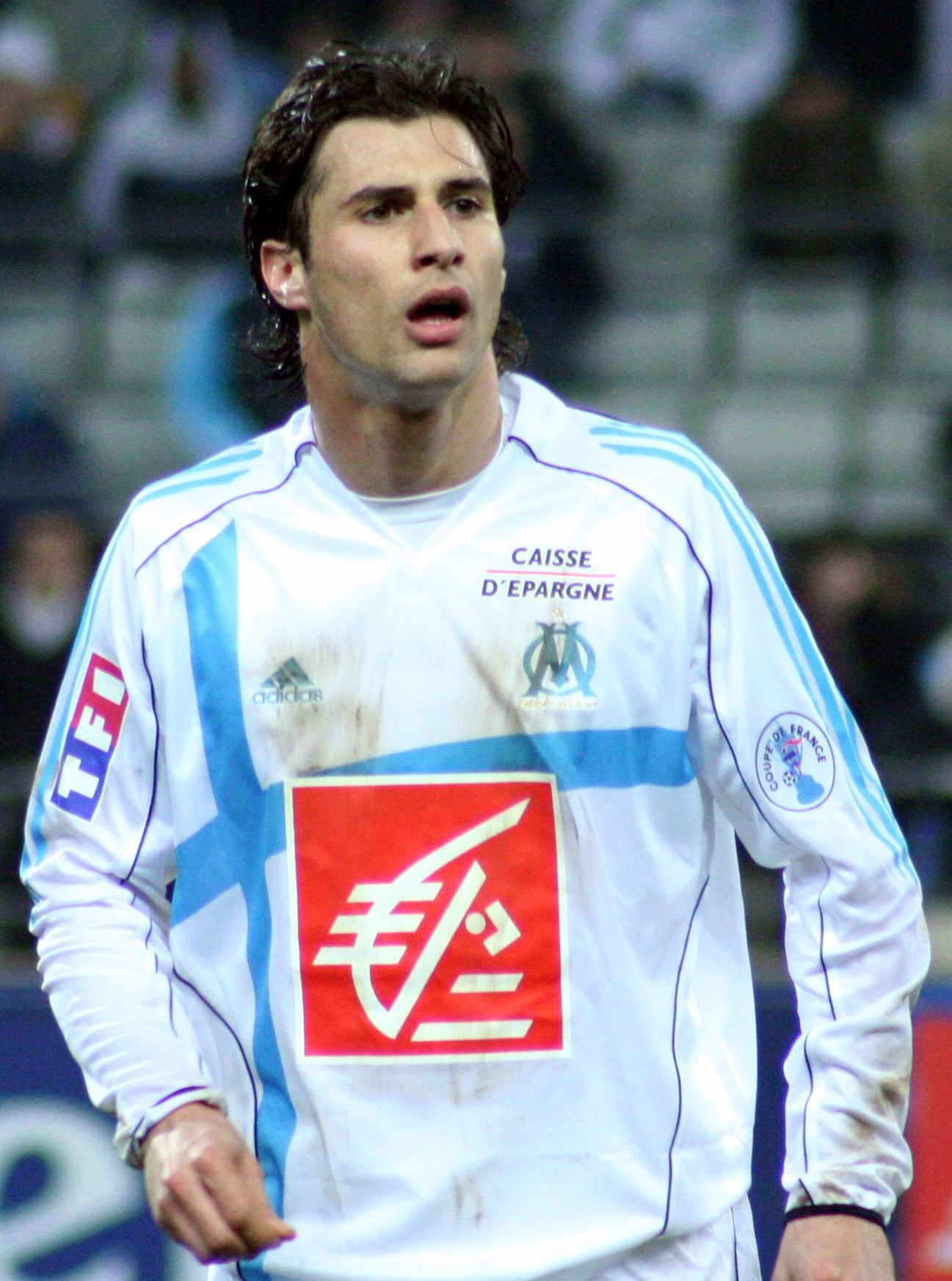
Lorik Cana

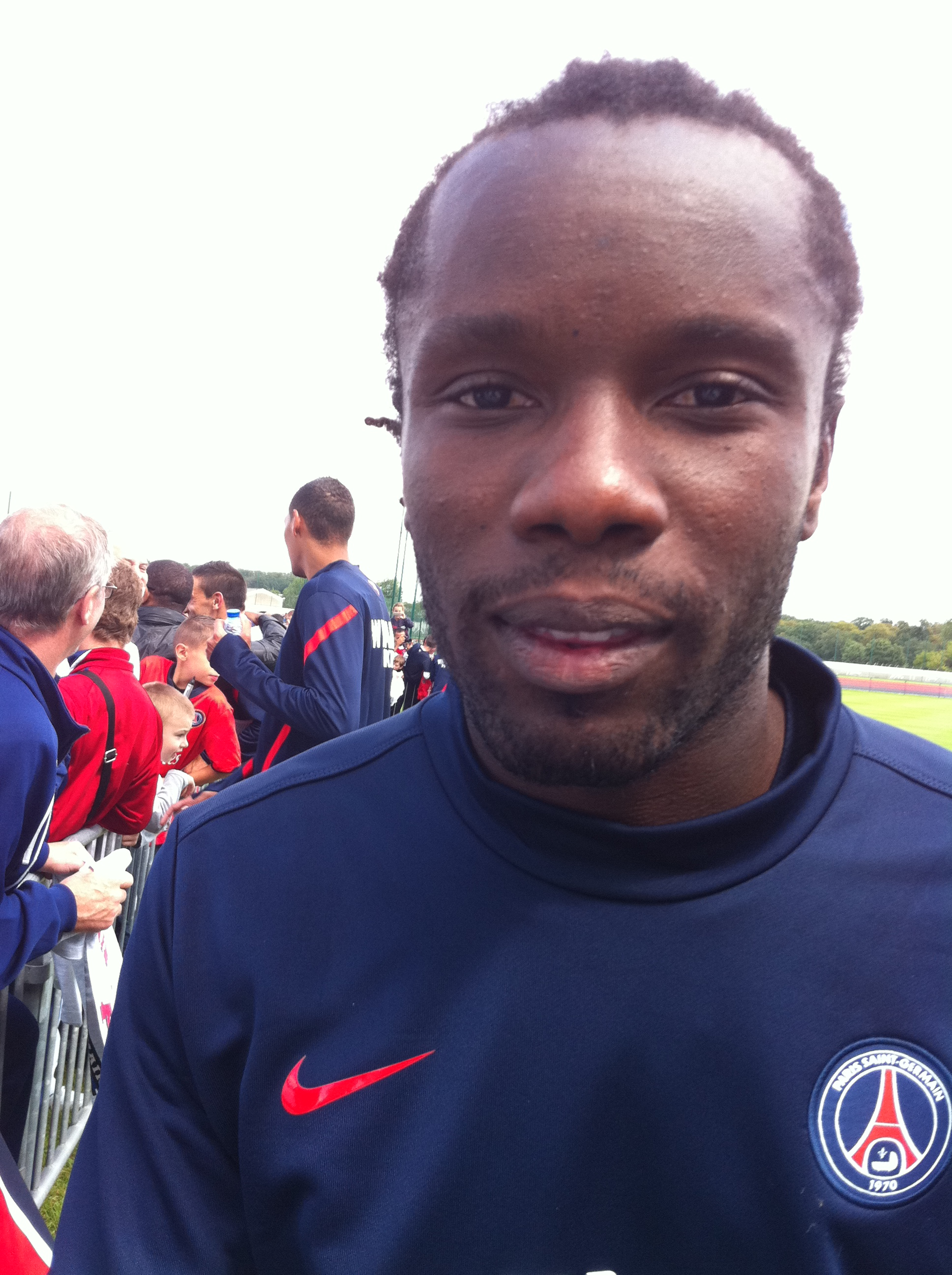
Peguy Luyindula

No.	Player
1	(France) Fabrice Abriel
2	(France) Jérôme Alonzo
3	(Brazil) André Luiz
4	(France) Jocelyn Angloma
5	(France) William Ayache
6	(Algeria) Djamel Belmadi
7	(France) Hatem Ben Arfa
8	(France) Daniel Bravo
9	(Senegal) Boubacar Sarr
10	(France) François Brisson
11	(France) Zoumana Camara
12	(Albania) Lorik Cana
13	(France) Benoît Cauet
14	(France) Édouard Cissé
15	(France) Patrick Colleter

No.	Player
16	(France) Lassana Diarra
17	(France) Stéphane Dalmat
18	(France) Marcel Defalco
19	(France) Frédéric Déhu
20	(France) Jean-Pierre Destrumelle
21	(Guinea) Kaba Diawara
22	(France) Jean Djorkaeff
23	(France) Jean-Pierre Dogliani
24	(France) Fabrice Fiorèse
25	(France) Laurent Fournier
26	(France) Bruno Germain
27	(France) Xavier Gravelaine
28	(Argentina) Gabriel Heinze
29	(France) Thierry Laurey
30	(France) Jean-Louis Leonetti

No.	Player
31	(France) Yvon Le Roux
32	(France) Jérôme Leroy
33	(France) Claude Lowitz
34	(France) Peter Luccin
35	(France) Peguy Luyindula
36	(France) Claude Makélélé
37	(France) Florian Maurice
38	(Cameroon) Modeste M'bami
39	(France) Fabrice Moreau
40	(France) Michel N'Gom
41	(France) Bruno Ngotty
42	(France) Pascal Nouma
43	(France) Jacky Novi
44	(Socialist Federal Republic of Yugoslavia) Ilija Pantelić
45	(France) Bernard Pardo

No.	Player
46	(France) Cyrille Pouget
47	(France) Adrien Rabiot
48	(France) Alain Roche
49	(Cameroon) Jean-Pierre Tokoto
50	(Liberia) George Weah
51	(United States) Timothy Weah
52	(France) Daniel Xuereb

=== Most expensive transfers ===
Rank	Player	Year	From	To	Fee (€)	Source
1	(France) Peter Luccin	2000	OM	PSG	€13.5m	
2	(France) Stéphane Dalmat	2000	OM	PSG	€10.75m	
3	(France) Jocelyn Angloma	1991	PSG	OM	€6m	
4	(France) Florian Maurice	1998	PSG	OM	€6m	
5	(France) Peguy Luyindula	2007	OM	PSG	€4m	
6	(Albania) Lorik Cana	2005	PSG	OM	€4m	
7	(France) Fabrice Fiorèse	2005	PSG	OM	€3m	
8	(Cameroon) Modeste M'bami	2006	PSG	OM	€2.5m	

Paris Saint-Germain Olympique de Marseille

== Women's rivalry ==
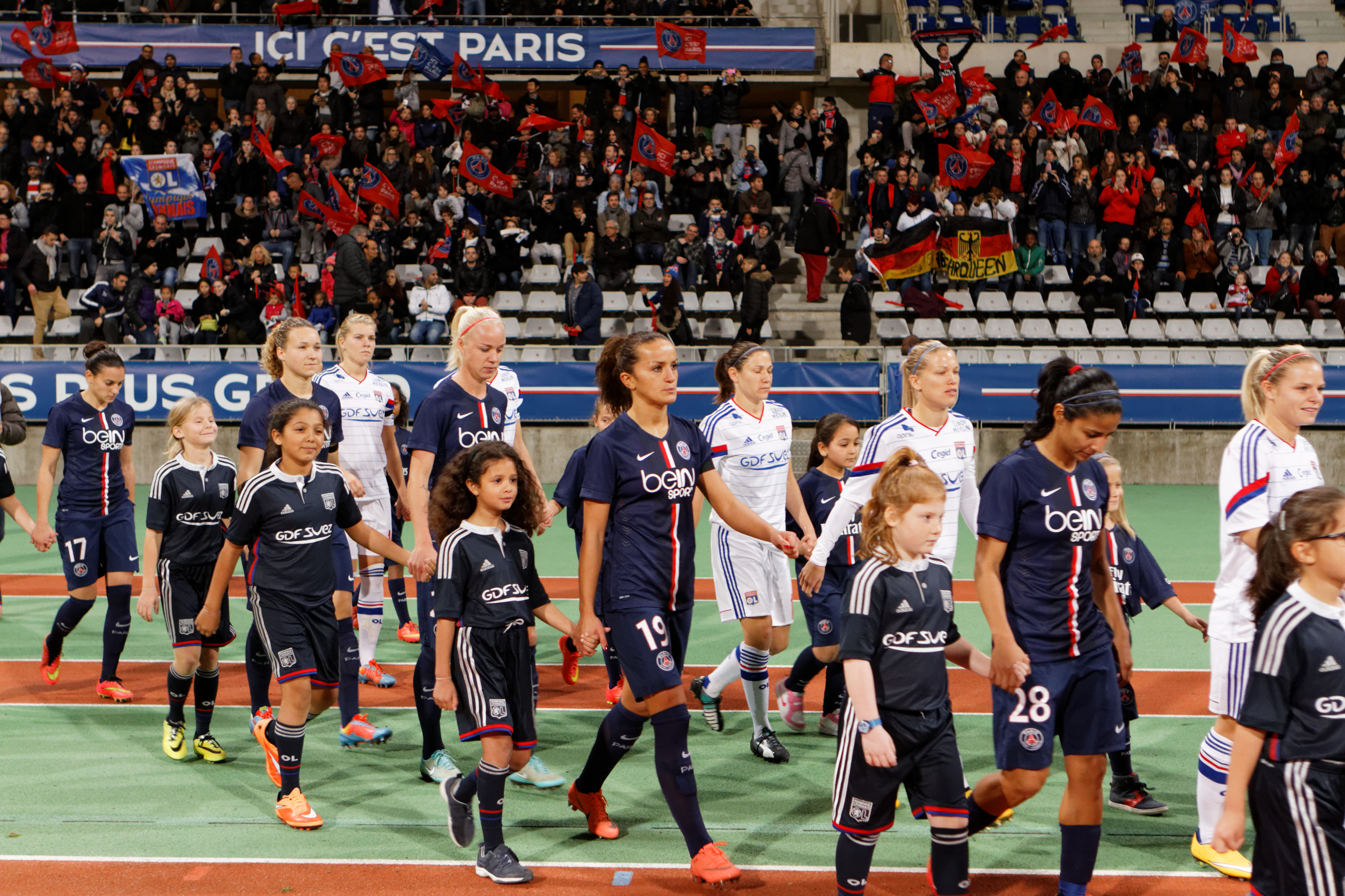
Players of PSG and Lyon walk onto the pitch ahead of their 2014 encounter.

The women's rivalry mirrors the prominence of the men's version. Women's Le Classique is contested between Paris Saint-Germain (PSG) and OL Lyonnes (Lyon), the two most successful clubs in French women's football. First played in 1994, the fixture has grown in prominence to become one of the marquee matchups in the Première Ligue, France's top women's league. Over the years, the rivalry has featured closely contested league games, cup finals, and European encounters, drawing increased attention as both clubs have competed for national and continental honours.

By the end of the 2000s, Lyon had established overwhelming dominance in French and European women's football. PSG gradually emerged as a credible challenger in the 2010s following its acquisition by Qatar Sports Investments (QSI) in 2012. From the mid-2010s onward, the two sides regularly finished in the top two positions of the Première Ligue and faced each other repeatedly in the Coupe de France Féminine and the UEFA Women's Champions League. Although Lyon largely maintained the upper hand, PSG recorded notable milestones, including their first league victory over Lyon in 2014 and a landmark European success in 2015. Intense competition for elite players in the transfer market has further heightened tensions between two of the best-resourced clubs in women's football.

Public interest in the fixture grew steadily, leading it to be widely known as the women's Le Classique or Le Classico. A key turning point occurred in 2018, when PSG won their first trophy against Lyon by lifting the Coupe de France, symbolizing a narrowing of the competitive gap despite Lyon's continued domestic and European dominance. The rivalry intensified through a series of high-profile encounters in the 2020s, notably PSG ending Lyon's 80-match unbeaten league run and securing their first Première Ligue title in 2021. Lyon, however, retained the upper hand in decisive Champions League knockout ties and domestic finals between 2022 and 2025.
