= Bernard Pardo =

French footballer (born 1960)

Personal information
- Date of birth: 19 December 1960 (age 65)
- Place of birth: Gardanne, Bouches-du-Rhône, France
- Height: 1.73 m (5 ft 8 in)
- Position: Midfielder

Youth career
- Gardannes AS

Senior career*
Years	Team	Apps	(Gls)
1978–1979	Boulogne	33	(4)
1979–1980	Lille	2	(0)
1980–1985	Brest	176	(13)
1985–1986	Saint-Étienne	20	(2)
1986–1989	Toulon	111	(6)
1989–1990	Bordeaux	37	(1)
1990–1991	Marseille	26	(1)
1991–1992	Paris Saint-Germain	6	(0)
1993–1994	Toulon	11	(1)
Total		422	(28)

International career
1988–1991	France	13	(0)
- * Club domestic league appearances and goals

Bernard Pardo (born 19 December 1960) is a former professional footballer who played for a number of clubs in the French Division 1 and for the France national team. In 1993, he was sent to jail for cocaine traffic, which interrupted his career.

== Personal life ==
Pardo was born in France to a French father and an Armenian mother.

== Honours ==
Marseille

- French Division 1: 1990–91
- European Cup: runner-up 1990–91
