= 2002–03 Paris Saint-Germain FC season =

33rd season in existence of Paris Saint-Germain

Paris Saint-Germain
2002–03 season
- President: Laurent Perpère
- Head coach: Luis Fernández
- Stadium: Parc des Princes
- Ligue 1: 11th
- Coupe de France: Runners-up
- Coupe de la Ligue: Second round
- UEFA Cup: Third round
- Top goalscorer: League: Ronaldinho (8); Aloísio (8); All: Ronaldinho (11)
- Highest home attendance: 43,284 (vs Lens, 12 April 2003)
- Lowest home attendance: 17,459 (vs Național București, 14 November 2002)
- Average home league attendance: 38,481
Home colours	Away colours

The 2002–03 season was Paris Saint-Germain's 33rd season in existence. PSG played their home league games at the Parc des Princes in Paris, registering an average attendance of 38,481 spectators per match. The club was presided by Laurent Perpère and the team was coached by Luis Fernández. Mauricio Pochettino was the team captain.

== Players ==
As of the 2002–03 season.

Note: Flags indicate national team as defined under FIFA eligibility rules; some limited exceptions apply. Players may hold more than one non-FIFA nationality.

No.	Pos.	Nation	Player
1	GK	FRA	Lionel Letizi
2	DF	ARG	Gabriel Heinze
3	DF	FRA	Lionel Potillon
4	MF	FRA	Jérôme Leroy
5	DF	ARG	Mauricio Pochettino (captain)
7	MF	FRA	André Luiz
8	MF	FRA	Stéphane Pédron (on loan from Lens)
9	FW	ARG	Martín Cardetti
10	FW	BRA	Ronaldinho
11	FW	BRA	José Aloisio
14	FW	FRA	Fabrice Fiorèse
15	DF	BRA	Paulo César

No.	Pos.	Nation	Player
16	GK	FRA	Jérôme Alonzo
17	MF	FRA	Francis Llacer
18	DF	FRA	Didier Domi
19	MF	ALB	Lorik Cana
20	MF	FRA	Hugo Leal
21	FW	FRA	Alioune Touré
22	DF	ESP	Cristóbal
26	FW	NGR	Bartholomew Ogbeche
27	MF	FRA	Romain Rocchi
28	MF	POR	Filipe Teixeira
30	GK	FRA	Stéphane Gillet
33	MF	GHA	Alex Nyarko (on loan from Everton)

== Pre-season and friendlies ==
Win Draw Loss

6 July 2002 Friendly	Xerez (Spain)	1–10	(France) Paris Saint-Germain	Jerez de la Frontera, Spain
				Stadium: Campo Hotel Barceló Montecastillo
Note: Match was played in four 20-minute parts.

10 July 2002 Friendly	Châteauroux (France)	2–1	(France) Paris Saint-Germain	Blois, France
				Stadium: Allées Jean Leroi Municipal Stadium

13 July 2002 Friendly	Amiens (France)	3–0	(France) Paris Saint-Germain	Amiens, France
				Stadium: Stade de la Licorne

16 July 2002 Friendly	Paris Saint-Germain (France)	1–0	(Croatia) Dinamo Zagreb	Le Petit-Quevilly, France
				Stadium: Stade Robert-Diochon; Attendance: 3,000

20 July 2002 Friendly	Sporting CP (Portugal)	2–2	(France) Paris Saint-Germain	Lisbon, Portugal
				Stadium: Estádio José Alvalade; Attendance: 8,255

23 July 2002 Friendly	Paris Saint-Germain (France)	3–1	(Belgium) Lierse	Le Touquet, France
				Stadium: Stade Ferdi Petit

26 July 2002 Friendly	Paris Saint-Germain (France)	0–0 (5–6 p)	(Portugal) Porto	Paris, France
				Stadium: Stade Charléty; Attendance: 10,000

20 August 2002 Friendly	Celta Vigo (Spain)	3–1	(France) Paris Saint-Germain	Vigo, Spain
				Stadium: Balaídos; Attendance: 8,000

6 September 2002 Friendly	Créteil (France)	0–2	(France) Paris Saint-Germain	Créteil, France
				Stadium: Stade Dominique Duvauchelle; Attendance: 4,000

28 March 2003 Friendly	Athletic Bilbao (Spain)	0–2	(France) Paris Saint-Germain	Bayonne, France
				Stadium: Stade Jean Dauger; Attendance: 5,000

15 April 2003 Friendly	Paris Saint-Germain (France)	1–1 (6–5 p)	(Portugal) Benfica	Paris, France
				Stadium: Stade Charléty; Attendance: 10,000

15 May 2003 Friendly	Paris Saint-Germain (France)	3–0	Équipe de France de la Police	Paris, France
				Stadium: Parc des Princes

== Competitions ==
=== Overview ===
Competition	First match	Last match	Starting round	Final position	Record							
Competition	First match	Last match	Starting round	Final position	Pld	W	D	L	GF	GA	GD	Win %
Ligue 1	3 August 2002	24 May 2002	Matchday 1	11th	38	14	12	12	47	36	+11	36.84
Coupe de France	5 January 2003	31 May 2003	Round of 64	Runners-up	6	5	0	1	8	3	+5	83.33
Coupe de la Ligue	8 December 2002		Round of 32	Round of 32	1	0	0	1	2	3	−1	0.00
UEFA Cup	19 September 2002	12 December 2002	First round	Third round	6	5	0	1	9	2	+7	83.33
Total					51	24	12	15	66	44	+22	47.06

Source: Soccerway

=== Ligue 1 ===
==== League table ====
Pos	Team	Pld	W	D	L	GF	GA	GD	Pts	Qualification or relegation
9	Nantes	38	16	8	14	37	39	−2	56	Qualification to Intertoto Cup third round
10	Nice	38	13	16	9	39	31	+8	55	Qualification to Intertoto Cup second round
11	Paris Saint-Germain	38	14	12	12	47	36	+11	54	
12	Bastia	38	12	11	15	40	48	−8	47	
13	Strasbourg	38	11	12	15	40	54	−14	45	

Source: Ligue 1
Rules for classification: 1) points; 2) goal difference; 3) number of goals scored.

==== Results summary ====
Overall								Home						Away					
Pld	W	D	L	GF	GA	GD	Pts	W	D	L	GF	GA	GD	W	D	L	GF	GA	GD
38	14	12	12	47	36	+11	54	10	6	3	31	14	+17	4	6	9	16	22	−6

Source: Ligue 1

==== Results by round ====
Round	1	2	3	4	5	6	7	8	9	10	11	12	13	14	15	16	17	18	19	20	21	22	23	24	25	26	27	28	29	30	31	32	33	34	35	36	37	38
Ground	H	A	H	A	H	A	H	H	A	H	A	H	A	H	A	H	A	H	A	H	A	H	A	H	A	A	H	A	H	A	H	A	H	A	H	A	H	A
Result	W	D	D	W	D	L	W	D	D	W	W	W	L	D	L	L	L	W	L	D	D	W	D	W	W	L	L	L	W	W	W	D	L	D	W	L	D	L
Position	5	6	9	4	4	9	4	6	6	3	3	2	2	3	4	7	10	7	10	8	10	8	10	8	8	8	10	12	9	9	7	8	9	9	8	9	9	11

Source: Ligue 1
A = Away; H = Home; W = Win; D = Draw; L = Loss

==== Matches ====
3 August 2002 1	Paris Saint-Germain	1–0	Auxerre	Paris
20:00 CEST (UTC+2)	Aloísio 51' (pen.)			Stadium: Parc des Princes; Attendance: 41,077; Referee: Stéphane Bré

9 August 2002 2	Bordeaux	0–0	Paris Saint-Germain	Bordeaux
20:45 CEST (UTC+2)				Stadium: Stade Chaban-Delmas; Attendance: 32,566; Referee: Éric Poulat

17 August 2002 3	Paris Saint-Germain	2–2	Ajaccio	Paris
20:00 CEST (UTC+2)	Cardetti 44'; Aloísio 45'		Granon 70'; Alicarte 90'	Stadium: Parc des Princes; Attendance: 35,539; Referee: Thierry Auriac

25 August 2002 4	Le Havre	0–1	Paris Saint-Germain	Le Havre
20:45 CEST (UTC+2)			Aloísio 90+2'	Stadium: Stade Jules Deschaseaux; Attendance: 15,632; Referee: Bertrand Layec

31 August 2002 5	Paris Saint-Germain	1–1	Nice	Paris
20:00 CEST (UTC+2)	Cardetti 73'		Everson 61'	Stadium: Parc des Princes; Attendance: 41,326; Referee: Pascal Viléo

11 September 2002 6	Lille	2–1	Paris Saint-Germain	Lille
20:30 CEST (UTC+2)	Manchev 28', 74'		Ronaldinho 48' (pen.)	Stadium: Stade Grimonprez-Jooris; Attendance: 17,447; Referee: Stéphane Moulin

14 September 2002 7	Paris Saint-Germain	3–0	Strasbourg	Paris
20:00 CEST (UTC+2)	Fiorèse 7'; Cardetti 14', 47'			Stadium: Parc des Princes; Attendance: 36,494; Referee: Damien Ledentu

22 September 2002 8	Paris Saint-Germain	1–1	Bastia	Paris
20:45 CEST (UTC+2)	Paulo César 77'		Laslandes 57'	Stadium: Parc des Princes; Attendance: 36,169; Referee: Laurent Duhamel

28 September 2002 9	Montpellier	1–1	Paris Saint-Germain	Montpellier
20:00 CEST (UTC+2)	Bamogo 13'		Paulo César 65'	Stadium: Stade de la Mosson; Attendance: 18,456; Referee: Bruno Coué

6 October 2002 10	Paris Saint-Germain	5–0	Guingamp	Paris
20:45 CEST (UTC+2)	Paulo César 12', 62'; Aloísio 15', 24'; Cardetti 30'			Stadium: Parc des Princes; Attendance: 38,604; Referee: Stéphane Lannoy

19 October 2002 11	Troyes	1–2	Paris Saint-Germain	Troyes
20:00 CEST (UTC+2)	Saïfi 18'		Cardetti 3'; Ronaldinho 8'	Stadium: Stade de l'Aube; Attendance: 13,976; Referee: Stéphane Bré

26 October 2002 12	Paris Saint-Germain	3–0	Marseille	Paris
17:15 CEST (UTC+2)	Ronaldinho 15', 37' (pen.); Cardetti 81'			Stadium: Parc des Princes; Attendance: 41,949; Referee: Éric Poulat

3 November 2002 13	Sedan	3–1	Paris Saint-Germain	Sedan
18:30 CET (UTC+1)	Noro 8'; Asuar 50', 67'		Déhu 33'	Stadium: Stade Louis Dugauguez; Attendance: 18,652; Referee: Pascal Viléo

9 November 2002 14	Paris Saint-Germain	1–1	Sochaux	Paris
20:00 CET (UTC+1)	Ogbeche 64'		Mathieu 48'	Stadium: Parc des Princes; Attendance: 40,992; Referee: Bertrand Layec

17 November 2002 15	Lens	3–2	Paris Saint-Germain	Lens
20:45 CET (UTC+1)	Sibierski 29'; Moreira 60'; Utaka 68'		Heinze 39'; André Luiz 48'	Stadium: Stade Félix-Bollaert; Attendance: 39,393; Referee: Damien Ledentu

22 November 2002 16	Paris Saint-Germain	0–1	Nantes	Paris
20:45 CET (UTC+1)			Armand 30'	Stadium: Parc des Princes; Attendance: 39,827; Referee: Claude Colombo

30 November 2002 17	Monaco	3–1	Paris Saint-Germain	Monaco
17:15 CET (UTC+1)	Nonda 40', 70'; Márquez 80'		Ronaldinho 25'	Stadium: Stade Louis II; Attendance: 10,685; Referee: Laurent Duhamel

4 December 2002 18	Paris Saint-Germain	2–0	Lyon	Paris
18:30 CET (UTC+1)	Heinze 37'; El Karkouri 52'			Stadium: Parc des Princes; Attendance: 39,645; Referee: Stéphane Bré

15 December 2002 19	Rennes	1–0	Paris Saint-Germain	Rennes
20:00 CET (UTC+1)	Arribagé 69'			Stadium: Stade de la Route de Lorient; Attendance: 22,503; Referee: Thierry Auriac

19 December 2002 20	Paris Saint-Germain	1–1	Bordeaux	Paris
20:45 CET (UTC+1)	Fiorèse 12'		Feindouno 40'	Stadium: Parc des Princes; Attendance: 39,485; Referee: Damien Ledentu

11 January 2003 21	Ajaccio	0–0	Paris Saint-Germain	Ajaccio
20:15 CET (UTC+1)				Stadium: Stade François Coty; Attendance: 7,040; Referee: Alain Hamer

15 January 2003 22	Paris Saint-Germain	1–0	Le Havre	Paris
20:00 CET (UTC+1)	Aloísio 36'			Stadium: Parc des Princes; Attendance: 33,438; Referee: Stéphane Lannoy

22 January 2003 23	Nice	0–0	Paris Saint-Germain	Nice
20:30 CET (UTC+1)				Stadium: Stade du Ray; Attendance: 15,838; Referee: Éric Poulat

29 January 2003 24	Paris Saint-Germain	1–0	Lille	Paris
20:30 CET (UTC+1)	Pochettino 48'			Stadium: Parc des Princes; Attendance: 34,576; Referee: Laurent Duhamel

1 February 2003 25	Strasbourg	0–1	Paris Saint-Germain	Strasbourg
20:00 CET (UTC+1)			Aloísio 60'	Stadium: Stade de la Meinau; Attendance: 16,406; Referee: Claude Colombo

5 February 2003 26	Bastia	1–0	Paris Saint-Germain	Furiani
20:30 CET (UTC+1)	Maurice 37'			Stadium: Stade Armand-Cesari; Attendance: 8,065; Referee: Alain Sars

8 February 2003 27	Paris Saint-Germain	1–3	Montpellier	Paris
20:00 CET (UTC+1)	Leroy 3'		Mézague 14', 19'; Mansaré 74'	Stadium: Parc des Princes; Attendance: 35,657; Referee: Philippe Kalt

22 February 2003 28	Guingamp	3–2	Paris Saint-Germain	Guingamp
17:15 CET (UTC+1)	Guillaume 60'; Drogba 67', 89'		Ronaldinho 20'; Leroy 57'	Stadium: Stade de Roudourou; Attendance: 15,616; Referee: Damien Ledentu

1 March 2003 29	Paris Saint-Germain	4–2	Troyes	Paris
20:00 CET (UTC+1)	Pédron 35'; Aloísio 58'; Fiorèse 69'; Leroy 90'		Adam 10'; Benachour 28'	Stadium: Parc des Princes; Attendance: 36,961; Referee: Pascal Viléo

9 March 2003 30	Marseille	0–3	Paris Saint-Germain	Marseille
20:45 CET (UTC+1)			Leroy 27', 84'; Ronaldinho 56'	Stadium: Stade Vélodrome; Attendance: 55,982; Referee: Bertrand Layec

22 March 2003 31	Paris Saint-Germain	2–0	Sedan	Paris
20:00 CET (UTC+1)	Pochettino 68'; Pédron 85'			Stadium: Parc des Princes; Attendance: 40,666; Referee: Améziane Khendek

5 April 2003 32	Sochaux	0–0	Paris Saint-Germain	Montbéliard
20:00 CEST (UTC+2)				Stadium: Stade Auguste-Bonal; Attendance: 19,682; Referee: Claude Colombo

12 April 2003 33	Paris Saint-Germain	0–1	Lens	Paris
20:00 CEST (UTC+2)			Moreira 46'	Stadium: Parc des Princes; Attendance: 43,284; Referee: Bruno Ruffray

19 April 2003 34	Nantes	1–1	Paris Saint-Germain	Nantes
20:00 CEST (UTC+2)	Gillet 48'		Touré 66'	Stadium: Stade de la Beaujoire; Attendance: 36,101; Referee: Éric Poulat

4 May 2003 35	Paris Saint-Germain	2–1	Monaco	Paris
20:45 CEST (UTC+2)	Fiorèse 58'; Ronaldinho 76' (pen.)		Nonda 39'	Stadium: Parc des Princes; Attendance: 40,450; Referee: Stéphane Bré

11 May 2003 36	Lyon	1–0	Paris Saint-Germain	Lyon
21:00 CEST (UTC+2)	Anderson 25'			Stadium: Stade de Gerland; Attendance: 37,823; Referee: Laurent Duhamel

20 May 2003 37	Paris Saint-Germain	0–0	Rennes	Paris
20:00 CEST (UTC+2)				Stadium: Parc des Princes; Attendance: 40,619; Referee: Claude Colombo

24 May 2003 38	Auxerre	2–0	Paris Saint-Germain	Auxerre
20:30 CEST (UTC+2)	Kapo 8', 27'			Stadium: Stade de l'Abbé-Deschamps; Attendance: 16,999; Referee: Philippe Kalt

=== Coupe de France ===
5 January 2003 Round of 64	Besançon RC	0–1 (a.e.t.)	Paris Saint-Germain	Montbéliard
17:00 CET (UTC+1)	Khelfa (yellow card) 34'; Maire (yellow card) 119'		Ogbeche (yellow card) 55'; Déhu (yellow card) 60'; Teixeira (yellow card) 62'; Potillon 112'	Stadium: Stade Auguste-Bonal; Attendance: 11,220; Referee: Philippe Kalt

25 January 2003 Round of 32	Paris Saint-Germain	2–1 (a.e.t.)	Marseille	Paris
20:45 CET (UTC+1)	Pochettino 14' (yellow card) 18'; Ogbeche (yellow card) 59'; Déhu (yellow card) 71'; Fiorèse 102'; El Karkouri (yellow card) 108' (yellow-red card) 120+1'; Llacer (yellow card) 112'		Meïté (yellow card) 9'; Bakayoko (yellow card) 29'; Leboeuf (yellow card) 33'; Hemdani (yellow card) 54'; Van Buyten 62' (yellow card) 64'; Sytchev (yellow card) 105'; Dos Santos (red card) 90+1'	Stadium: Parc des Princes; Attendance: 38,150; Referee: Stéphane Bré

16 February 2003 Round of 16	Laval	0–1	Paris Saint-Germain	Laval
17:00 CET (UTC+1)	Néva (yellow card) 40'		Heinze (yellow card) 47'; Fiorèse 53'	Stadium: Stade Francis Le Basser; Attendance: 14,483; Referee: Claude Colombo

15 March 2003 Quarter-finals	Martigues	0–1	Paris Saint-Germain	Martigues
20:00 CET (UTC+1)	Hamga (yellow card) 35'; Magalhaes (yellow card) 85'		Ronaldinho 76'	Stadium: Stade Francis Turcan; Attendance: 8,000; Referee: Laurent Duhamel

27 April 2003 Semi-finals	Paris Saint-Germain	2–0	Bordeaux	Paris
21:00 CEST (UTC+2)	Ronaldinho 21', 80'; Fiorèse (yellow card) 67'; Luiz (yellow card) 90+2'		Costa (yellow card) 32'; Caneira (red card) 56'; Afanou (yellow card) 90+2'	Stadium: Parc des Princes; Attendance: 39,122; Referee: Claude Colombo

31 May 2003 Final	Paris Saint-Germain	1–2	Auxerre	Saint-Denis
20:45 CEST (UTC+2)	Leal 21' (red card) 66'; Fiorèse (yellow card) 56'		Faye (yellow card) 43'; Kapo (yellow card) 74'; Cissé 76'; Boumsong 89'	Stadium: Stade de France; Attendance: 78,315; Referee: Bertrand Layec

=== Coupe de la Ligue ===
8 December 2002 Second round	Paris Saint-Germain	2–3	Nantes	Paris
20:45 CET (UTC+1)	Nyarko 43'; Heinze 50'; Cristóbal (yellow card) 67'; Heinze (yellow card) 76'; Ronaldinho (penalty missed) 83'		Yepes 27'; Armand 35'; Laspalles (yellow card) 64'; Djemba-Djemba (yellow card) 67'; Alonzo 78' (o.g.)	Stadium: Parc des Princes; Attendance: 23,176; Referee: Bruno Coué

=== UEFA Cup ===
==== First round ====
The draw for the first round was held on 30 August 2002.

19 September 2002 First leg	Paris Saint-Germain (France)	3–0	(Hungary) Újpest	Paris, France
20:45 CEST (UTC+2)	Ronaldinho 13'; Pochettino 24'; Cardetti 44'	Report		Stadium: Parc des Princes; Attendance: 21,495; Referee: Dermot Gallagher (England)

3 October 2002 Second leg	Újpest (Hungary)	0–1 (0–4 agg.)	(France) Paris Saint-Germain	Újpest, Hungary
19:00 CEST (UTC+2)		Report	Benachour 60'	Stadium: Megyeri úti Stadion; Attendance: 5,964; Referee: Karel Vidlák (Czech Republic)

==== Second round ====
The draw for the second round was held on 8 October 2002.

31 October 2002 First leg	Național București (Romania)	0–2	(France) Paris Saint-Germain	Bucharest, Romania
19:00 CET (UTC+1)		Report	L. Leroy 5' (yellow card) 32' (yellow-red card) 63'; André Luiz 69'	Stadium: Stadionul Cotroceni; Attendance: 4,000; Referee: Steve Bennett (England)

14 November 2002 Second leg	Paris Saint-Germain (France)	1–0 (3–0 agg.)	(Romania) Național București	Paris, France
20:30 CET (UTC+1)	L. Leroy 56'	Report		Stadium: Parc des Princes; Attendance: 17,459; Referee: Tomasz Mikulski (Poland)

==== Final phase ====
===== Third round =====
The draw for the third round was held on 15 November 2002.

26 November 2002 First leg	Paris Saint-Germain (France)	2–1	(Portugal) Boavista	Paris, France
18:00 CET (UTC+1)	Nyarko 16'; Déhu (red card) 32'; Fiorese 45'	Report	Luiz Cláudio 75'	Stadium: Parc des Princes; Attendance: 20,012; Referee: Massimo De Santis (Italy)

12 December 2002 Second leg	Boavista (Portugal)	1–0 (2a–2 agg.)	(France) Paris Saint-Germain	Porto, Portugal
22:30 CET (UTC+1)	Silva 56' (pen.)	Report		Stadium: Estádio do Bessa; Attendance: 5,592; Referee: Željko Širić (Croatia)
