= 2001–02 Paris Saint-Germain FC season =

32nd season in existence of Paris Saint-Germain

Paris Saint-Germain
2001–02 season
- President: Laurent Perpère
- Head coach: Luis Fernández
- Stadium: Parc des Princes
- Division 1: 4th
- Coupe de France: Quarter-finals
- Coupe de la Ligue: Semi-finals
- Intertoto Cup: Winners
- UEFA Cup: Third round
- Top goalscorer: League: Ronaldinho (8); Fabrice Fiorèse (8); All: Ronaldinho (13)
- Highest home attendance: 43,930 (vs Lens, 8 September 2001)
- Lowest home attendance: 19,794 (vs Lorient, 9 March 2002)
- Average home league attendance: 41,040
| Home colours | Away colours | Third colours |

The 2001–02 season was Paris Saint-Germain's 32nd season in existence. PSG played their home league games at the Parc des Princes in Paris, registering an average attendance of 41,040 spectators per match. The club was presided by Laurent Perpère and the team was coached by Luis Fernández. Frédéric Déhu was the team captain.

== Players ==
As of the 2001–02 season.

=== Squad ===
Note: Flags indicate national team as defined under FIFA eligibility rules; some limited exceptions apply. Players may hold more than one non-FIFA nationality.

| No. | Pos. | Nation | Player |
|---|---|---|---|
| 1 | GK | FRA | Lionel Letizi |
| 2 | DF | ARG | Gabriel Heinze |
| 3 | DF | FRA | Lionel Potillon |
| 4 | MF | ESP | Mikel Arteta (on loan from Barcelona B) |
| 5 | DF | ARG | Mauricio Pochettino |
| 6 | MF | FRA | Frédéric Déhu (captain) |
| 7 | FW | BRA | Aloísio |
| 8 | MF | POR | Hugo Leal |
| 9 | FW | FRA | Nicolas Anelka |
| 10 | MF | NGA | Jay-Jay Okocha |
| 11 | FW | BRA | Alex Dias |
| 12 | DF | MAR | Talal El Karkouri |
| 14 | MF | FRA | Fabrice Fiorèse |

| No. | Pos. | Nation | Player |
|---|---|---|---|
| 16 | GK | LUX | Stéphane Gillet |
| 17 | DF | FRA | Francis Llacer |
| 18 | DF | FRA | Didier Domi |
| 20 | MF | FRA | Édouard Cissé |
| 21 | MF | BRA | Ronaldinho |
| 22 | DF | ESP | Cristóbal |
| 23 | DF | FRA | Pierre Ducrocq |
| 24 | DF | FRA | Bernard Mendy |
| 26 | FW | NGA | Bartholomew Ogbeche |
| 28 | MF | FRA | Jérôme Leroy |
| 30 | GK | FRA | Jérôme Alonzo |
| 36 | MF | POR | Agostinho (on loan from Málaga) |

=== Left club during season ===
Note: Flags indicate national team as defined under FIFA eligibility rules; some limited exceptions apply. Players may hold more than one non-FIFA nationality.

| No. | Pos. | Nation | Player |
|---|---|---|---|
| 11 | MF | FRA | Laurent Robert (to Newcastle United) |
| 14 | MF | ALG | Ali Benarbia (to Manchester City) |
| 15 | DF | FRA | Sylvain Distin (on loan to Newcastle United) |
| 17 | MF | FRA | Selim Benachour (Note: Benachour was born in Paris, France, but also qualified to represent Tunisia internationally and would make his international debut for Tunisia in 2002.) (on loan to Martigues) |

| No. | Pos. | Nation | Player |
|---|---|---|---|
| 25 | MF | FRA | Éric Rabésandratana (Note: Rabésandratana was born in Épinay-sur-Seine, France, but also qualified to represent Madagascar internationally and would make his international debut for Madagascar in 2007.) (to AEK Athens) |
| 26 | MF | SEN | Aliou Cissé (on loan to Montpelier) |
| 27 | FW | FRA | Gaël Hiroux (on loan to Martigues) |

== Competitions ==
=== Overview ===
| Competition | First match | Last match | Starting round | Final position | Record | | | | | | | |
| Competition | First match | Last match | Starting round | Final position | Pld | W | D | L | GF | GA | GD | Win % |
|---|---|---|---|---|---|---|---|---|---|---|---|---|
| French Division 1 | 28 July 2001 | 4 May 2002 | Matchday 1 | 4th | 34 | 15 | 13 | 6 | 43 | 24 | +19 | 44.12 |
| Coupe de France | 15 December 2001 | 9 March 2002 | Round of 64 | Quarter-finals | 4 | 2 | 1 | 1 | 4 | 2 | +2 | 50.00 |
| Coupe de la Ligue | 2 December 2001 | 2 March 2002 | Round of 32 | Semi-finals | 4 | 2 | 1 | 1 | 4 | 3 | +1 | 50.00 |
| UEFA Intertoto Cup | 1 July 2001 | 21 August 2001 | Second round | Winners | 8 | 5 | 3 | 0 | 20 | 3 | +17 | 62.50 |
| UEFA Cup | 18 September 2001 | 6 December 2001 | First round | Third round | 6 | 2 | 4 | 0 | 9 | 2 | +7 | 33.33 |
| Total | | | | | 56 | 26 | 22 | 8 | 80 | 34 | +46 | 46.43 |

Source: Competitions

=== Division 1 ===
==== League table ====
| Pos | Team | Pld | W | D | L | GF | GA | GD | Pts | Qualification or relegation |
|---|---|---|---|---|---|---|---|---|---|---|
| 2 | Lens | 34 | 18 | 10 | 6 | 55 | 30 | +25 | 64 | Qualification to Champions League first group stage |
| 3 | Auxerre | 34 | 16 | 11 | 7 | 48 | 38 | +10 | 59 | Qualification to Champions League third qualifying round |
| 4 | Paris Saint-Germain | 34 | 15 | 13 | 6 | 43 | 24 | +19 | 58 | Qualification to UEFA Cup first round |
| 5 | Lille | 34 | 15 | 11 | 8 | 39 | 32 | +7 | 56 | Qualification to Intertoto Cup third round |
| 6 | Bordeaux | 34 | 14 | 8 | 12 | 34 | 31 | +3 | 50 | Qualification to UEFA Cup first round (Note: Bordeaux was qualified for the 2002–03 UEFA Cup as winners of the 2001–02 Coupe de la Ligue.) |

Source: Ligue 1
Rules for classification: 1) points; 2) goal difference; 3) number of goals scored.

==== Results summary ====
| Overall | | | | | | | | Home | | | | | | Away | | | | | |
| Pld | W | D | L | GF | GA | GD | Pts | W | D | L | GF | GA | GD | W | D | L | GF | GA | GD |
|---|---|---|---|---|---|---|---|---|---|---|---|---|---|---|---|---|---|---|---|
| 34 | 15 | 13 | 6 | 43 | 24 | +19 | 58 | 8 | 8 | 1 | 26 | 9 | +17 | 7 | 5 | 5 | 17 | 15 | +2 |

Source: LFP.fr

==== Results by round ====
| Match | 1 | 2 | 3 | 4 | 5 | 6 | 7 | 8 | 9 | 10 | 11 | 12 | 13 | 14 | 15 | 16 | 17 | 18 | 19 | 20 | 21 | 22 | 23 | 24 | 25 | 26 | 27 | 28 | 29 | 30 | 31 | 32 | 33 | 34 |
|---|---|---|---|---|---|---|---|---|---|---|---|---|---|---|---|---|---|---|---|---|---|---|---|---|---|---|---|---|---|---|---|---|---|---|
| Round | H | A | H | A | H | H | A | H | A | H | A | H | A | H | A | H | A | H | A | H | A | A | H | A | H | A | H | A | H | A | H | A | H | A |
| Result | D | D | W | D | W | D | D | D | L | D | W | W | L | D | W | D | W | D | W | L | W | D | W | D | W | L | W | W | W | W | D | L | W | L |
| Position | 11 | 13 | 8 | 7 | 4 | 6 | 5 | 6 | 8 | 8 | 8 | 7 | 8 | 8 | 8 | 7 | 5 | 5 | 5 | 6 | 5 | 4 | 4 | 4 | 4 | 4 | 4 | 4 | 4 | 4 | 3 | 4 | 4 | 4 |

Source: LFP.fr
A = Away; H = Home; W = Win; D = Draw; L = Loss

==== Matches ====
| 28 July 2001 1 | Paris Saint-Germain | 0–0 | Lille | Paris |
| 17:15 CEST (UTC+2) | | | | Stadium: Parc des Princes; Attendance: 39,416; Referee: Laurent Duhamel |

| 4 August 2001 2 | Auxerre | 1–1 | Paris Saint-Germain | Auxerre |
| 20:00 CEST (UTC+2) | D. Cissé 82' | | Pochettino 40' | Stadium: Stade Abbé-Deschamps; Attendance: 18,749; Referee: Claude Colombo |

| 11 August 2001 3 | Paris Saint-Germain | 1–0 | Sochaux | Paris |
| 20:00 CEST (UTC+2) | Aloisio 90' | | | Stadium: Parc des Princes; Attendance: 40,577; Referee: Damien Ledentu |

| 18 August 2001 4 | Monaco | 2–2 | Paris Saint-Germain | Monaco |
| 17:15 CEST (UTC+2) | Nonda 39'; Giuly 55' | | Déhu 68'; Aloisio 75' | Stadium: Stade Louis II; Attendance: 14,900; Referee: Alain Sars |

| 25 August 2001 5 | Paris Saint-Germain | 3–0 | Rennes | Paris |
| 20:00 CEST (UTC+2) | Okocha 61'; Mendy 78'; Aloisio 84' | | | Stadium: Parc des Princes; Attendance: 40,756; Referee: Franck Glochon |

| 8 September 2001 6 | Paris Saint-Germain | 2–2 | Lens | Paris |
| 20:00 CEST (UTC+2) | Anelka 68'; Alex 70' | | Pédron 18'; Diouf 51' | Stadium: Parc des Princes; Attendance: 43,930; Referee: Gilles Veissière |

| 15 September 2001 7 | Lorient | 1–1 | Paris Saint-Germain | Lorient |
| 20:00 CEST (UTC+2) | Feindouno 78' | | Anelka 88' | Stadium: Stade du Moustoir; Attendance: 14,466; Referee: Thierry Auriac |

| 21 September 2001 8 | Paris Saint-Germain | 0–0 | Montpellier | Paris |
| 20:45 CEST (UTC+2) | | | | Stadium: Parc des Princes; Attendance: 38,611; Referee: Éric Poulat |

| 30 September 2001 9 | Bordeaux | 1–0 | Paris Saint-Germain | Bordeaux |
| 20:45 CEST (UTC+2) | Pauleta 26' | | | Stadium: Stade Chaban-Delmas; Attendance: 30,930; Referee: Claude Colombo |

| 14 October 2001 10 | Paris Saint-Germain | 2–2 | Lyon | Paris |
| 20:45 CEST (UTC+2) | Okocha 18'; Ronaldinho 81' (pen.) | | Née 14'; Govou 27' | Stadium: Parc des Princes; Attendance: 41,945; Referee: Stéphane Bré |

| 21 October 2001 11 | Sedan | 1–2 | Paris Saint-Germain | Sedan |
| 20:45 CEST (UTC+2) | Mionnet 67' | | Aloisio 53'; Déhu 79' | Stadium: Stade Louis Dugauguez; Attendance: 19,174; Referee: Alain Sars |

| 27 October 2001 12 | Paris Saint-Germain | 1–0 | Bastia | Paris |
| 20:00 CEST (UTC+2) | Aloisio 27' | | | Stadium: Parc des Princes; Attendance: 40,879; Referee: Thierry Auriac |

| 4 November 2001 13 | Troyes | 1–0 | Paris Saint-Germain | Troyes |
| 18:00 CET (UTC+1) | Loko 65' | | | Stadium: Stade de l'Aube; Attendance: 15,688; Referee: Stéphane Moulin |

| 17 November 2001 14 | Paris Saint-Germain | 1–1 | Guingamp | Paris |
| 20:00 CET (UTC+1) | Leal 57' | | Saci 87' | Stadium: Parc des Princes; Attendance: 40,069; Referee: Philippe Kalt |

| 25 November 2001 15 | Nantes | 1–2 | Paris Saint-Germain | Nantes |
| 20:45 CET (UTC+1) | Bonilla 31' | | Ogbeche 55'; Ronaldinho 62' | Stadium: Stade de la Beaujoire; Attendance: 33,966; Referee: Éric Poulat |

| 29 November 2001 16 | Paris Saint-Germain | 0–0 | Marseille | Paris |
| 20:45 CET (UTC+1) | | | | Stadium: Parc des Princes; Attendance: 42,178; Referee: Bertrand Layec |

| 9 December 2001 17 | Metz | 0–2 | Paris Saint-Germain | Metz |
| 18:00 CET (UTC+1) | | | Ogbeche 52'; Okocha 88' | Stadium: Stade Saint-Symphorien; Attendance: 19,817; Referee: Stéphane Bré |

| 19 December 2001 18 | Paris Saint-Germain | 0–0 | Auxerre | Paris |
| 20:30 CET (UTC+1) | | | | Stadium: Parc des Princes; Attendance: 42,233; Referee: Gilles Veissière |

| 22 December 2001 19 | Sochaux | 0–2 | Paris Saint-Germain | Montbéliard |
| 17:15 CET (UTC+1) | | | Leroy 39'; Ogbeche 44' | Stadium: Stade Auguste-Bonal; Attendance: 19,213; Referee: Philippe Kalt |

| 5 January 2002 20 | Paris Saint-Germain | 1–2 | Monaco | Paris |
| 20:00 CET (UTC+1) | Ronaldinho 42' (pen.) | | Camara 63'; Gallardo 90' | Stadium: Parc des Princes; Attendance: 42,141; Referee: Laurent Duhamel |

| 12 January 2002 21 | Rennes | 1–2 | Paris Saint-Germain | Rennes |
| 17:15 CET (UTC+1) | Le Roux 72' | | Ronaldinho 20'; Alex 45' | Stadium: Stade de la Route de Lorient; Attendance: 18,366; Referee: Bruno Coué |

| 24 January 2002 22 | Lens | 1–1 | Paris Saint-Germain | Lens |
| 20:45 CET (UTC+1) | Pédron 89' | | Ronaldinho 86' (pen.) | Stadium: Stade Félix-Bollaert; Attendance: 36,732; Referee: Damien Ledentu |

| 30 January 2002 23 | Paris Saint-Germain | 5–0 | Lorient | Paris |
| 20:30 CET (UTC+1) | Déhu 4'; Fiorèse 13'; Ronaldinho 40'; Leroy 55', 69' | | | Stadium: Parc des Princes; Attendance: 37,680; Referee: Dominique Fraise |

| 2 February 2002 24 | Montpellier | 0–0 | Paris Saint-Germain | Montpellier |
| 17:15 CET (UTC+1) | | | | Stadium: Stade de la Mosson; Attendance: 17,731; Referee: Claude Colombo |

| 7 February 2002 25 | Paris Saint-Germain | 1–0 | Bordeaux | Paris |
| 20:45 CET (UTC+1) | Déhu 78' | | | Stadium: Parc des Princes; Attendance: 42,014; Referee: Stéphane Bré |

| 17 February 2002 26 | Lyon | 3–0 | Paris Saint-Germain | Lyon |
| 20:45 CET (UTC+1) | Déhu 61' (o.g.); Anderson 76'; Juninho 86' | | | Stadium: Stade de Gerland; Attendance: 38,323; Referee: Damien Ledentu |

| 23 February 2002 27 | Paris Saint-Germain | 3–0 | Sedan | Paris |
| 20:00 CET (UTC+1) | Arteta 22' (pen.); Alex 82'; É. Cissé 89' | | | Stadium: Parc des Princes; Attendance: 40,095; Referee: Alain Hamer |

| 6 March 2002 28 | Bastia | 0–1 | Paris Saint-Germain | Furiani |
| 18:00 CET (UTC+1) | | | Ogbeche 49' | Stadium: Stade Armand-Cesari; Attendance: 9,283; Referee: Claude Colombo |

| 16 March 2002 29 | Paris Saint-Germain | 3–1 | Troyes | Paris |
| 20:00 CET (UTC+1) | Aloisio 55'; Ronaldinho 62', 73' | | Svensson 15' | Stadium: Parc des Princes; Attendance: 38,914; Referee: Améziane Khendek |

| 23 March 2002 30 | Guingamp | 0–1 | Paris Saint-Germain | Guingamp |
| 17:15 CET (UTC+1) | | | Fiorèse 17' | Stadium: Stade du Roudourou; Attendance: 16,400; Referee: Dominique Fraise |

| 6 April 2002 31 | Paris Saint-Germain | 1–1 | Nantes | Paris |
| 20:00 CEST (UTC+2) | Okocha 55' | | Quint 39' | Stadium: Parc des Princes; Attendance: 43,817; Referee: Alain Sars |

| 12 April 2002 32 | Marseille | 1–0 | Paris Saint-Germain | Marseille |
| 20:45 CEST (UTC+2) | Van Buyten 64' | | | Stadium: Stade Vélodrome; Attendance: 55,797; Referee: Laurent Duhamel |

| 27 April 2002 33 | Paris Saint-Germain | 2–0 | Metz | Paris |
| 20:00 CEST (UTC+2) | Fiorèse 61'; Ronaldinho 68' | | | Stadium: Parc des Princes; Attendance: 42,425; Referee: Stéphane Bré |

| 4 May 2002 34 | Lille | 1–0 | Paris Saint-Germain | Lille |
| 20:00 CEST (UTC+2) | Sterjovski 72' | | | Stadium: Stade Grimonprez-Jooris; Attendance: 20,380; Referee: Éric Poulat |

=== Coupe de France ===
| 15 December 2001 Round of 64 | Luçon | 0–2 | Paris Saint-Germain | Niort |
| 20:00 | | | Agostinho 27'; Arteta 49' | Stadium: Stade René-Gaillard; Attendance: 4,284; Referee: Yves Brizou |

| 19 January 2002 Round of 32 | Yzeure | 0–1 | Paris Saint-Germain | Clermont-Ferrand |
| 20:00 | Jorrand (yellow card) 86' | | Heinze (yellow card) 21'; Aloísio 62'; Arteta (yellow card) 71' | Stadium: Stade Gabriel Montpied; Attendance: 9,500; Referee: Pascal Viléo |

| 10 February 2002 Round of 16 | Paris Saint-Germain | 1–1 (a.e.t.) (7–6 p) | Marseille | Paris |
| 20:45 | El Karkouri (yellow card) 10'; Alonzo (yellow card) 45'; Déhu (yellow card) 57'; Heinze (yellow card) 72'; Leal (yellow card) 83'; Heinze 87' | | Alfonso (yellow card) 11'; Luiz (yellow card) 14'; Sakho (yellow card) 34'; Van Buyten 68'; Delfim (yellow card) 71'; Dos Santos (yellow card) 98' | Stadium: Parc des Princes; Attendance: 33,790; Referee: Alain Sars |
| | Penalties |
| | Déhu (penalty scored); Leal (penalty missed); Aloísio (penalty scored); Alex (penalty missed); Ronaldinho (penalty scored); Heinze (penalty scored); Leroy (penalty scored); Fiorèse (penalty scored); El Karkouri (penalty scored) | | (penalty missed) Delfim; (penalty missed) Dalmat; (penalty scored) Luiz; (penalty scored) Tuzzio; (penalty scored) Alfonso; (penalty scored) Bakayoko; (penalty scored) Jurietti; (penalty scored) Dos Santos; (penalty missed) Van Buyten |

| 9 March 2002 Quarter-finals | Paris Saint-Germain | 0–1 | Lorient | Paris |
| 17:00 | Aloísio (yellow card) 55' | | Chabert 32' (yellow card) 89'; Bedrossian (yellow card) 64'; Dudoit (yellow card) 80'; Le Garrec (yellow card) 89' | Stadium: Parc des Princes; Attendance: 19,794; Referee: Éric Poulat |

=== Coupe de la Ligue ===
| 2 December 2001 Round of 32 | Troyes | 0–4 | Paris Saint-Germain | Troyes |
| 15:15 | Celestini (yellow card) 15'; Sekli (yellow card) 58' | Report | Déhu (yellow card) 11' (goal) 90'; Ogbeche 17'; Mendy 26' (yellow card) 59'; Okocha 58' (pen.); Domi (yellow card) 71' | Stadium: Stade de l'Aube; Attendance: 15,779; Referee: Bruno Coué |

| 8 January 2002 Round of 16 | Paris Saint-Germain | 3–1 | Guingamp | Paris |
| 20:00 | Arteta 5' (pen.); Pochettino (yellow card) 17'; Ronaldinho 72', 90'; Aloísio (yellow card) 72' | Report | Joseph-Augustin (red card) 5'; Tasfaout 42' (pen.); Saci (yellow card) 84' | Stadium: Parc des Princes; Attendance: 21,842; Referee: Claude Colombo |

| 27 January 2002 Quarter-finals | Paris Saint-Germain | 1–1 (a.e.t.) (4–3 p) | Nancy | Paris |
| 20:45 | Domi 30' (yellow card) 90'; Cissé (yellow card) 107' | Report | Florentin 12' (yellow card) 73'; Chabaud (yellow card) 99' | Stadium: Parc des Princes; Attendance: 25,442; Referee: Philippe Kalt |
| | Penalties |
| | Domi (penalty scored); Ogbeche (penalty missed); Arteta (penalty scored); Leroy (penalty missed); Ronaldinho (penalty scored); Pochettino (penalty scored) | | (penalty missed) Chabaud; (penalty scored) Lécluse; (penalty scored) Camara; (penalty missed) Nicaise; (penalty scored) Zoko; (penalty missed) Moracchini |

| 2 March 2002 Semi-finals | Paris Saint-Germain | 0–1 | Bordeaux | Paris |
| 20:45 | Fiorèse (yellow card) 36'; Potillon (yellow card) 46'; Déhu (yellow card) 80'; Cristóbal (yellow card) 83'; Arteta (yellow card) 83'; Mendy (red card) 83'; Leroy (yellow card) 87' | Report | Jemmali (yellow card) 19'; Afanou (yellow card) 27'; Pauleta 80' (pen.) | Stadium: Parc des Princes; Attendance: 37,664; Referee: Gilles Veissière |

=== Intertoto Cup ===
==== Second round ====
| 1 July 2001 First leg | Paris Saint-Germain (France) | 3–0 | (Finland) Jazz | Toulouse, France |
| 18:00 | Robert 44', 57', 67' | Report | | Stadium: Stadium Municipal; Attendance: 3,789; Referee: Ivan Novak (Croatia) |

| 7 July 2001 Second leg | Jazz (Finland) | 1–4 (1–7 agg.) | (France) Paris Saint-Germain | Pori, Finland |
| 18:00 | Juntunen 52' | Report | Okocha 20', 60' (pen.); Robert 32'; Hiroux 73' | Stadium: Porin Stadion; Attendance: 3,803; Referee: Spiridon Papadakos (Greece) |

==== Third round ====
| 15 July 2001 First leg | Tavriya Simferopol (Ukraine) | 0–1 | (France) Paris Saint-Germain | Simferopol, Ukraine |
| 19:00 | | Report | Heinze 56' | Stadium: Lokomotiv Stadium; Attendance: 18,000; Referee: Dick van Egmond (Netherlands) |

| 21 July 2001 Second leg | Paris Saint-Germain (France) | 4–0 (5–0 agg.) | (Ukraine) Tavriya Simferopol | Toulouse, France |
| 18:00 | Okocha 4'; Aloísio 10', 70'; Benarbia 62' | Report | | Stadium: Stadium Municipal; Attendance: 2,037; Referee: Víctor José Esquinas Torres (Spain) |

==== Semi-finals ====
| 25 July 2001 First leg | Gent (Belgium) | 0–0 | (France) Paris Saint-Germain | Ghent, Belgium |
| 18:00 | | Report | | Stadium: Jules Ottenstadion; Attendance: 5,000; Referee: Vladimír Hriňák (Slovakia) |

| 1 August 2001 Second leg | Paris Saint-Germain (France) | 7–1 (7–1 agg.) | (Belgium) Gent | Paris, France |
| 20:00 | Arteta 11'; Mendy 35'; Anelka 45', 63'; Okocha 56' (pen.), 60'; Hiroux 89' | Report | Kraouche 72' | Stadium: Parc des Princes; Attendance: 29,149; Referee: Steve Bennett (England) |

==== Final ====
| 7 August 2001 First leg | Paris Saint-Germain (France) | 0–0 | (Italy) Brescia | Paris, France |
| 20:30 | | Report | | Stadium: Parc des Princes; Attendance: 35,000; Referee: Mike McCurry (Scotland) |

| 21 August 2001 Second leg | Brescia (Italy) | 1–1 (1–1a agg.) | (France) Paris Saint-Germain | Brescia, Italy |
| 20:15 | Baggio 79' (pen.) | Report | Aloísio 74' | Stadium: Stadio Mario Rigamonti; Attendance: 23,000; Referee: Juan Antonio Fernández (Spain) |

=== UEFA Cup ===
==== First round ====
| 18 September 2001 First leg | Paris Saint-Germain (France) | 0–0 | (Romania) Rapid București | Paris, France |
| 18:00 | | Report | | Stadium: Parc des Princes; Attendance: 19,200; Referee: Željko Širić (Croatia) |

| 25 September 2001 Second leg | Rapid București (Romania) | 0–1 (a.e.t.) (0–3 agg.) | (France) Paris Saint-Germain | Bucharest, Romania |
| 18:00 | | Report | Aloísio 93' | Stadium: Stadionul Giulești-Valentin Stănescu; Attendance: 15,000; Referee: Darko Čeferin (Slovenia) |
Note: Paris Saint-Germain were awarded a 3–0 victory for the second leg as Rapid București walked out, therefore winning 3–0 on aggregate

==== Second round ====
| 18 October 2001 First leg | Paris Saint-Germain (France) | 4–0 | (Austria) Rapid Wien | Paris, France |
| 21:00 | Ronaldinho 16', 58'; Mendy 28'; Anelka 54' | Report | | Stadium: Parc des Princes; Attendance: 27,155; Referee: Fiorenzo Treossi (Italy) |

| 1 November 2001 Second leg | Rapid Wien (Austria) | 2–2 (2–6 agg.) | (France) Paris Saint-Germain | Vienna, Austria |
| 18:00 | Wagner 10', 16' | Report | Potillon 52'; Hugo Leal 91' | Stadium: Gerhard-Hanappi-Stadion; Attendance: 10,400; Referee: Roy Helge Olsen (Norway) |

==== Third round ====
| 22 November 2001 First leg | Rangers (Scotland) | 0–0 | (France) Paris Saint-Germain | Glasgow, Scotland |
| 21:00 | | Report | | Stadium: Ibrox Stadium; Attendance: 49,223; Referee: Karl-Erik Nilsson (Sweden) |

| 6 December 2001 Second leg | Paris Saint-Germain (France) | 0–0 (a.e.t.) (0–0 agg.) (3–4 p) | (Scotland) Rangers | Paris, France |
| 21:00 | | Report | | Stadium: Parc des Princes; Attendance: 45,000; Referee: Hartmut Strampe (Germany) |
| | Penalties |
| | Okocha (penalty missed); Ronaldinho (penalty scored); Arteta (penalty scored); Heinze (penalty missed); Mendy (penalty scored); Pochettino (penalty missed) | | (penalty scored) Amoruso; (penalty scored) Latapy; (penalty missed) Konterman; (penalty missed) Caniggia; (penalty scored) Numan; (penalty scored) Ferguson |
