= 2003 Coupe de France final =

Final of the 2002–03 edition of the Coupe de France

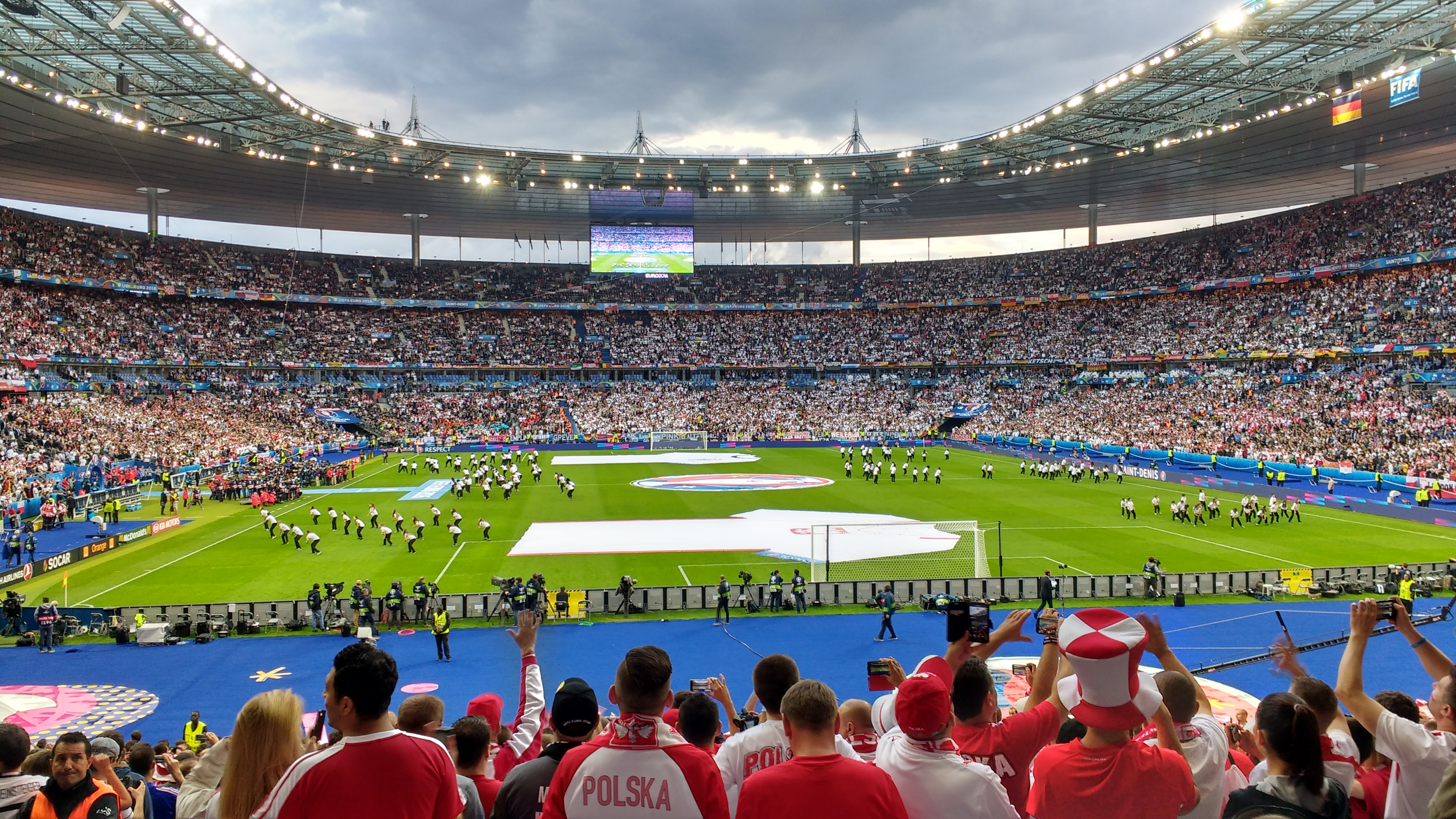
- Event: 2002–03 Coupe de France
Paris Saint-Germain	Auxerre
1	2
- Date: 31 May 2003
- Venue: Stade de France, Saint-Denis
- Referee: Bertrand Layec
- Attendance: 78,316

The 2003 Coupe de France final was a football match held at Stade de France, Saint-Denis on 31 May 2003. In it, AJ Auxerre defeated Paris SG 2–1 with goals from Djibril Cissé and Jean-Alain Boumsong.

== Road to the final ==
Paris Saint-Germain			Round	Auxerre
Opponent	H/A	Result	2002–03 Coupe de France	Opponent	H/A	Result
Besançon	A	1–0 (a.e.t.)	Round of 64	Caen	A	2–1
Marseille	H	2–1	Round of 32	Amnéville	A	3–0
Laval	A	1–0	Round of 16	Bourg-Péronnas	A	3–1
Martigues	A	1–0	Quarter-finals	Angoulême	A	0–0 (a.e.t.); 4−2 pen.
Bordeaux	H	2–0	Semi-finals	Rennes	H	2–1

== Match details ==
31 May 2003
20:45

Paris Saint-Germain	1–2	Auxerre
Leal 21'		Cissé 76'; Boumsong 89'

Stade de France, Saint-Denis
Attendance: 78,316
Referee: Bertrand Layec

Paris Saint-Germain	Auxerre

PARIS SG:
GK	1	(France) Jérôme Alonzo
DF	7	(Spain) Cristóbal Parralo
DF	5	(Argentina) Mauricio Pochettino
DF	2	(Argentina) Gabriel Heinze
DF	3	(France) Lionel Potillon		(substituted off) 90'
MF	4	(France) Jérôme Leroy
MF	6	(France) Frédéric Déhu
MF	8	(France) Stéphane Pedron		(substituted off) 84'
MF	9	(Portugal) Hugo Leal	(red card) 66'
FW	11	(France) Fabrice Fiorèse	(yellow card) 57'	(substituted off) 75'
FW	10	(Brazil) Ronaldinho
Substitutes:
MF	15	(Brazil) Paulo César		(substituted on) 75'
MF	14	(France) Francis Llacer		(substituted on) 84'
FW	16	(Brazil) Aloísio		(substituted on) 90'
Manager:
(France) Luis Fernández Assistant Referees: Fourth Official:

AJ AUXERRE:
GK	1	(France) Fabien Cool
DF	2	(France) Johan Radet
DF	5	(France) Philippe Mexès
DF	4	(France) Jean-Alain Boumsong
DF	3	(Cameroon) Jean-Joël Perrier-Doumbé
MF	6	(France) Lionel Mathis
MF	7	(Senegal) Amdy Faye	(yellow card) 44'	(substituted off) 71'
MF	8	(France) Yann Lachuer
MF	11	(Senegal) Khalilou Fadiga		(substituted off) 46'
FW	9	(France) Djibril Cissé
FW	10	(France) Olivier Kapo	(yellow card) 75'
Substitutes:
MF	12	(Ivory Coast) Kanga Akalé		(substituted on) 46'
FW	15	(Zimbabwe) Benjani		(substituted on) 71'
Manager:
(France) Guy Roux

== See also ==
- 2002–03 Coupe de France
