= 2003–04 Paris Saint-Germain FC season =

34th season in existence of Paris Saint-Germain

Paris Saint-Germain
2003–04 season
- President: Francis Graille
- Head coach: Vahid Halilhodžić
- Stadium: Parc des Princes
- Ligue 1: 2nd
- Coupe de France: Winners
- Coupe de la Ligue: Second round
- Top goalscorer: League: Pauleta (18); All: Pauleta (23)
- Highest home attendance: 42,502 (vs Lyon, 15 May 2004)
- Lowest home attendance: 20,141 (vs Troyes, 4 January 2004)
- Average home league attendance: 38,810
Home colours	Away colours	Third colours

The 2003–04 season was Paris Saint-Germain's 34th season in existence. PSG played their home league games at the Parc des Princes in Paris, registering an average attendance of 38,810 spectators per match. The club was presided by Francis Graille and the team was coached by Vahid Halilhodžić. Frédéric Déhu was the team captain.

== Players ==
As of the 2003–04 season.

=== Squad ===
Note: Flags indicate national team as defined under FIFA eligibility rules; some limited exceptions apply. Players may hold more than one non-FIFA nationality.

No.	Pos.	Nation	Player
1	GK	FRA	Lionel Letizi
2	DF	ARG	Gabriel Heinze
3	DF	ARG	Juan Pablo Sorín (on loan from Cruzeiro)
5	DF	FRA	Bernard Mendy
6	DF	FRA	Frédéric Déhu (captain)
8	FW	BRA	Reinaldo
9	FW	POR	Pauleta
10	MF	SCG	Branko Bošković
11	MF	FRA	Fabrice Fiorèse
12	DF	MAR	Talal El Karkouri
13	DF	FRA	Éric Cubilier

No.	Pos.	Nation	Player
16	GK	FRA	Jérôme Alonzo
18	MF	TUN	Selim Benachour
19	MF	ALB	Lorik Cana
20	MF	POR	Hugo Leal
21	MF	FRA	Romain Rocchi
23	MF	CMR	Modeste M'bami
24	DF	FRA	José-Karl Pierre-Fanfan
25	FW	FRA	Alioune Touré
28	FW	SCG	Danijel Ljuboja
30	GK	ALG	Mohamed Benhamou
33	FW	CIV	Franck Dja Djédjé

== Competitions ==
=== Overview ===
Competition	First match	Last match	Starting round	Final position	Record							
Competition	First match	Last match	Starting round	Final position	Pld	W	D	L	GF	GA	GD	Win %
Ligue 1	2 August 2003	23 May 2004	Matchday 1	2nd	38	22	10	6	50	28	+22	57.89
Coupe de France	4 January 2004	29 May 2004	Round of 64	Winners	6	5	1	0	11	6	+5	83.33
Coupe de la Ligue	29 October 2003		Second round	Second round	1	0	1	0	1	1	+0	0.00
Total					45	27	12	6	62	35	+27	60.00

Source: Competitions

=== Ligue 1 ===
==== League table ====
Pos	Team	Pld	W	D	L	GF	GA	GD	Pts	Qualification or relegation
1	Lyon (C)	38	24	7	7	64	26	+38	79	Qualification to Champions League group stage
2	Paris Saint-Germain	38	22	10	6	50	28	+22	76	Qualification to Champions League group stage
3	Monaco	38	21	12	5	59	30	+29	75	Qualification to Champions League third qualifying round
4	Auxerre	38	19	8	11	60	34	+26	65	Qualification to UEFA Cup first round
5	Sochaux	38	18	9	11	54	42	+12	63	Qualification to UEFA Cup first round

Source: Ligue 1
Rules for classification: 1) points; 2) goal difference; 3) number of goals scored.
(C) Champions

==== Results summary ====
Overall								Home						Away					
Pld	W	D	L	GF	GA	GD	Pts	W	D	L	GF	GA	GD	W	D	L	GF	GA	GD
38	22	10	6	50	28	+22	76	13	4	2	33	15	+18	9	6	4	17	13	+4

Source: Ligue 1

==== Results by round ====
Round	1	2	3	4	5	6	7	8	9	10	11	12	13	14	15	16	17	18	19	20	21	22	23	24	25	26	27	28	29	30	31	32	33	34	35	36	37	38
Ground	H	A	A	H	A	H	A	H	A	H	A	H	A	H	A	H	A	H	A	H	H	A	H	A	H	A	H	A	H	A	H	A	H	A	H	A	H	A
Result	D	L	W	L	L	W	W	W	W	W	D	L	W	D	W	W	D	W	D	W	D	D	W	W	W	D	D	W	W	L	W	W	W	D	W	L	W	W
Position	13	15	11	13	17	14	11	8	5	3	4	4	4	4	4	4	4	4	4	4	3	5	4	3	3	3	3	3	3	3	3	3	2	3	3	3	2	2

Source: Ligue 1
A = Away; H = Home; W = Win; D = Draw; L = Loss

==== Matches ====
2 August 2003 1	Paris Saint-Germain	0–0	Bastia	Paris
20:00 CEST (UTC+2)				Stadium: Parc des Princes; Attendance: 33,991; Referee: Thierry Auriac

9 August 2003 2	Lille	1–0	Paris Saint-Germain	Lille
17:15 CEST (UTC+2)	Tapia 45'			Stadium: Stade Grimonprez-Jooris; Attendance: 18,455; Referee: Éric Poulat

16 August 2003 3	Metz	0–1	Paris Saint-Germain	Metz
20:00 CEST (UTC+2)			Leroy 65'	Stadium: Stade Saint-Symphorien; Attendance: 25,060; Referee: Laurent Duhamel

24 August 2003 4	Paris Saint-Germain	2–4	Monaco	Paris
20:45 CEST (UTC+2)	Pauleta 14'; Reinaldo 49'		Giuly 35', 90'; Adebayor 37'; Squillaci 56'	Stadium: Parc des Princes; Attendance: 36,527; Referee: Alain Sars

30 August 2003 5	Montpellier	3–2	Paris Saint-Germain	Montpellier
20:00 CEST (UTC+2)	Bamogo 57', 64'; Pataca 84'		Reinaldo 18', 72'	Stadium: Stade de la Mosson; Attendance: 13,893; Referee: Claude Colombo

14 September 2003 6	Paris Saint-Germain	2–1	Toulouse	Paris
20:45 CEST (UTC+2)	Dieuze 25' (o.g.); Heinze 65'		Dieuze 59'	Stadium: Parc des Princes; Attendance: 30,361; Referee: Philippe Kalt

20 September 2003 7	Guingamp	0–2	Paris Saint-Germain	Guingamp
20:00 CEST (UTC+2)			Fiorèse 65'; Pauleta 70' (pen.)	Stadium: Stade de Roudourou; Attendance: 14,797; Referee: Bruno Ruffray

27 September 2003 8	Paris Saint-Germain	1–0	Auxerre	Paris
20:00 CEST (UTC+2)	Pauleta 9'			Stadium: Parc des Princes; Attendance: 39,777; Referee: Alain Hamer

4 October 2003 9	Sochaux	0–1	Paris Saint-Germain	Sochaux
20:00 CEST (UTC+2)			Pauleta 20'	Stadium: Stade Auguste-Bonal; Attendance: 19,561; Referee: Damien Ledentu

18 October 2003 10	Paris Saint-Germain	5–1	Le Mans	Paris
20:00 CEST (UTC+2)	Pauleta 28', 63'; Fiorèse 38', 62'; Reinaldo 90'		Molefe 12'	Stadium: Parc des Princes; Attendance: 41,709; Referee: Stéphane Lannoy

25 October 2003 11	Ajaccio	0–0	Paris Saint-Germain	Ajaccio
20:00 CEST (UTC+2)				Stadium: Stade François Coty; Attendance: 7,500; Referee: Éric Poulat

2 November 2003 12	Paris Saint-Germain	0–1	Lens	Paris
20:45 CET (UTC+1)			Moreira 78'	Stadium: Parc des Princes; Attendance: 38,563; Referee: Pascal Viléo

8 November 2003 13	Nantes	0–1	Paris Saint-Germain	Nantes
20:00 CET (UTC+1)			Fiorèse 61'	Stadium: Stade de la Beaujoire; Attendance: 34,310; Referee: Claude Colombo

23 November 2003 14	Paris Saint-Germain	0–0	Nice	Paris
20:45 CET (UTC+1)				Stadium: Parc des Princes; Attendance: 34,843; Referee: Laurent Duhamel

30 November 2003 15	Marseille	0–1	Paris Saint-Germain	Marseille
20:45 CET (UTC+1)			Fiorèse 87'	Stadium: Stade Vélodrome; Attendance: 55,493; Referee: Alain Sars

3 December 2003 16	Paris Saint-Germain	3–2	Strasbourg	Paris
21:00 CET (UTC+1)	Bošković 20'; Reinaldo 61'; Pauleta 67'		Ljuboja 13'; Fahmi 79'	Stadium: Parc des Princes; Attendance: 32,710; Referee: Bertrand Layec

6 December 2003 17	Rennes	1–1	Paris Saint-Germain	Rennes
20:00 CET (UTC+1)	Frei 73'		Fiorèse 48'	Stadium: Stade de la Route de Lorient; Attendance: 18,003; Referee: Gilles Veissière

13 December 2003 18	Paris Saint-Germain	2–1	Bordeaux	Paris
17:15 CET (UTC+1)	Reinaldo 35'; Pauleta 47'		Celades 17'	Stadium: Parc des Princes; Attendance: 41,512; Referee: Philippe Kalt

19 December 2003 19	Lyon	1–1	Paris Saint-Germain	Lyon
21:00 CET (UTC+1)	Carrière 82'	Report	Pauleta 41'	Stadium: Stade de Gerland; Attendance: 36,720; Referee: Stéphane Bré

10 January 2004 20	Paris Saint-Germain	1–0	Lille	Paris
17:15 CET (UTC+1)	Tavlaridis 12' (o.g.)			Stadium: Parc des Princes; Attendance: 38,620; Referee: Dominique Fraise

17 January 2004 21	Paris Saint-Germain	0–0	Metz	Paris
20:00 CET (UTC+1)		Report		Stadium: Parc des Princes; Attendance: 40,603; Referee: Claude Colombo

30 January 2004 22	Monaco	1–1	Paris Saint-Germain	Monaco
21:00 CET (UTC+1)	Squillaci 26'	Report	Heinze 31'	Stadium: Stade Louis II; Attendance: 14,500; Referee: Bertrand Layec

7 February 2004 23	Paris Saint-Germain	6–1	Montpellier	Paris
20:00 CET (UTC+1)	Ljuboja 7', 55'; Pauleta 20', 49'; Bošković 75'; Reinaldo 76'	Report	Džodić 53'	Stadium: Parc des Princes; Attendance: 38,952; Referee: Bruno Ruffray

14 February 2004 24	Toulouse	0–1	Paris Saint-Germain	Toulouse
21:00 CET (UTC+1)		Report	Ljuboja 28'	Stadium: Stade de Toulouse; Attendance: 24,218; Referee: Stéphane Lannoy

21 February 2004 25	Paris Saint-Germain	2–0	Guingamp	Paris
20:00 CET (UTC+1)	M'Bami 23'; Ljuboja 83'	Report		Stadium: Parc des Princes; Attendance: 41,447; Referee: Fredy Fautrel

29 February 2004 26	Auxerre	1–1	Paris Saint-Germain	Auxerre
20:45 CET (UTC+1)	D. Cissé 45'	Report	Cana 80'	Stadium: Stade de l'Abbé-Deschamps; Attendance: 17,174; Referee: Éric Poulat

6 March 2004 27	Paris Saint-Germain	1–1	Sochaux	Paris
20:00 CET (UTC+1)	Pauleta 49' (pen.)	Report	Santos 54'	Stadium: Parc des Princes; Attendance: 41,534; Referee: Alain Sars

13 March 2004 28	Le Mans	0–1	Paris Saint-Germain	Le Mans
17:15 CET (UTC+1)		Report	Ljuboja 67'	Stadium: Stade Léon-Bollée; Attendance: 14,981; Referee: Damien Ledentu

20 March 2004 29	Paris Saint-Germain	1–0	Ajaccio	Paris
20:00 CET (UTC+1)	Pauleta 67' (pen.)	Report		Stadium: Parc des Princes; Attendance: 38,580; Referee: Pascal Viléo

28 March 2004 30	Lens	1–0	Paris Saint-Germain	Le Mans
20:45 CEST (UTC+2)	Coridon 31'	Report		Stadium: Stade Bollaert-Delelis; Attendance: 37,575; Referee: Bertrand Layec

3 April 2004 31	Paris Saint-Germain	3–2	Nantes	Paris
20:00 CEST (UTC+2)	Armand 34' (o.g.); Bošković 68'; Pauleta 75'	Report	Pujol 16'; Ziani 89'	Stadium: Parc des Princes; Attendance: 40,000; Referee: Stéphane Lannoy

10 April 2004 32	Nice	1–2	Paris Saint-Germain	Nice
20:00 CEST (UTC+2)	Laslandes 16'	Report	Pierre-Fanfan 80'; Sorín 87'	Stadium: Stade du Ray; Attendance: 12,971; Referee: Laurent Duhamel

25 April 2004 33	Paris Saint-Germain	2–1	Marseille	Paris
18:15 CEST (UTC+2)	Pauleta 12', 61'	Report	Batlles 88'	Stadium: Parc des Princes; Attendance: 52,000; Referee: Stéphane Bré

1 May 2004 34	Strasbourg	0–0	Paris Saint-Germain	Strasbourg
20:00 CEST (UTC+2)		Report		Stadium: Stade de la Meinau; Attendance: 25,385; Referee: Bertrand Layec

8 May 2004 35	Paris Saint-Germain	1–0	Rennes	Paris
17:15 CEST (UTC+2)	Déhu 60'	Report		Stadium: Parc des Princes; Attendance: 41,444; Referee: Damien Ledentu

11 May 2004 36	Bordeaux	3–0	Paris Saint-Germain	Bordeaux
20:45 CEST (UTC+2)	Feindouno 21', 51'; Chamakh 74'	Report		Stadium: Stade Chaban-Delmas; Attendance: 30,527; Referee: Éric Poulat

15 May 2004 37	Paris Saint-Germain	1–0	Lyon	Paris
20:00 CEST (UTC+2)	Pauleta 6'	Report		Stadium: Parc des Princes; Attendance: 42,502; Referee: Stéphane Lannoy

23 May 2004 38	Bastia	0–1	Paris Saint-Germain	Furiani
20:00 CEST (UTC+2)		Report	Pauleta 53'	Stadium: Stade Armand-Cesari; Attendance: 9,243; Referee: Claude Colombo

=== Coupe de France ===
4 January 2004 Round of 64	Paris Saint-Germain	3–2 (a.e.t.)	Troyes	Paris
15:15 CET (UTC+1)	Heinze 88'; Ogbeche 90+1'; Pauleta 95'		Nivet 21'; Esteves 24' (pen.)	Stadium: Parc des Princes; Attendance: 20,141; Referee: Améziane Khendek

24 January 2004 Round of 32	Marseille	1–2 (a.e.t.)	Paris Saint-Germain	Marseille
17:00 CET (UTC+1)	Drogba 35'		Pauleta 10'; Sorín 103'	Stadium: Stade Vélodrome; Attendance: 53,000; Referee: Éric Poulat

10 February 2004 Round of 16	Paris Saint-Germain	2–0	Aviron Bayonnais	Paris
21:00 CET (UTC+1)	Fiorèse 69'; Pauleta 80'			Stadium: Parc des Princes; Attendance: 27,849; Referee: Stéphane Bré

16 March 2004 Quarter-finals	ESA Brive	1–2	Paris Saint-Germain	Brive-la-Gaillarde
21:00 CET (UTC+1)	Forest 15'		Pauleta 27'; Reinaldo 60'	Stadium: Stade Amédée-Domenech; Attendance: 13,000; Referee: Éric Poulat

28 April 2004 Semi-finals	Nantes	1–1 (a.e.t.) (3–4 p)	Paris Saint-Germain	Nantes
17:00 CEST (UTC+2)	Yepes 90+1'		Fiorèse 50'	Stadium: Stade de la Beaujoire; Attendance: 35,265; Referee: Alain Sars
	Penalties
	Toulalan (penalty scored); Vahirua (penalty missed); Yepes (penalty scored); Armand (penalty scored); Da Rocha (penalty missed); Faé (penalty missed); Berson (penalty missed)		(penalty scored) Déhu; (penalty scored) Heinze; (penalty missed) Leal; (penalty missed) Cana; (penalty scored) Sorín; (penalty missed) Mendy; (penalty scored) M'Bami

29 May 2004 Final	Paris Saint-Germain	1–0	Châteauroux	Saint-Denis
20:45 CEST (UTC+2)	Pauleta 66'			Stadium: Stade de France; Attendance: 78,853; Referee: Stéphane Bré

=== Coupe de la Ligue ===
29 October 2003 Second round	FC Gueugnon	1–1 (a.e.t.) (3–2 p)	Paris Saint-Germain	Gueugnon
16:05 CET (UTC+1)	Boutabout 15'		Reinaldo 62'	Stadium: Stade Jean Laville; Attendance: 8,407; Referee: Gilles Veissière
	Penalties
	Émeran (penalty scored); Casartelli (penalty scored); N'Gambi (penalty missed); Traoré (penalty scored); Levrat (penalty missed)		(penalty scored) Déhu; (penalty missed) Reinaldo; (penalty scored) Bošković; (penalty missed) Fiorèse; (penalty missed) Rocchi
