= Bartholomew Ogbeche =

Nigerian footballer (born 1984)

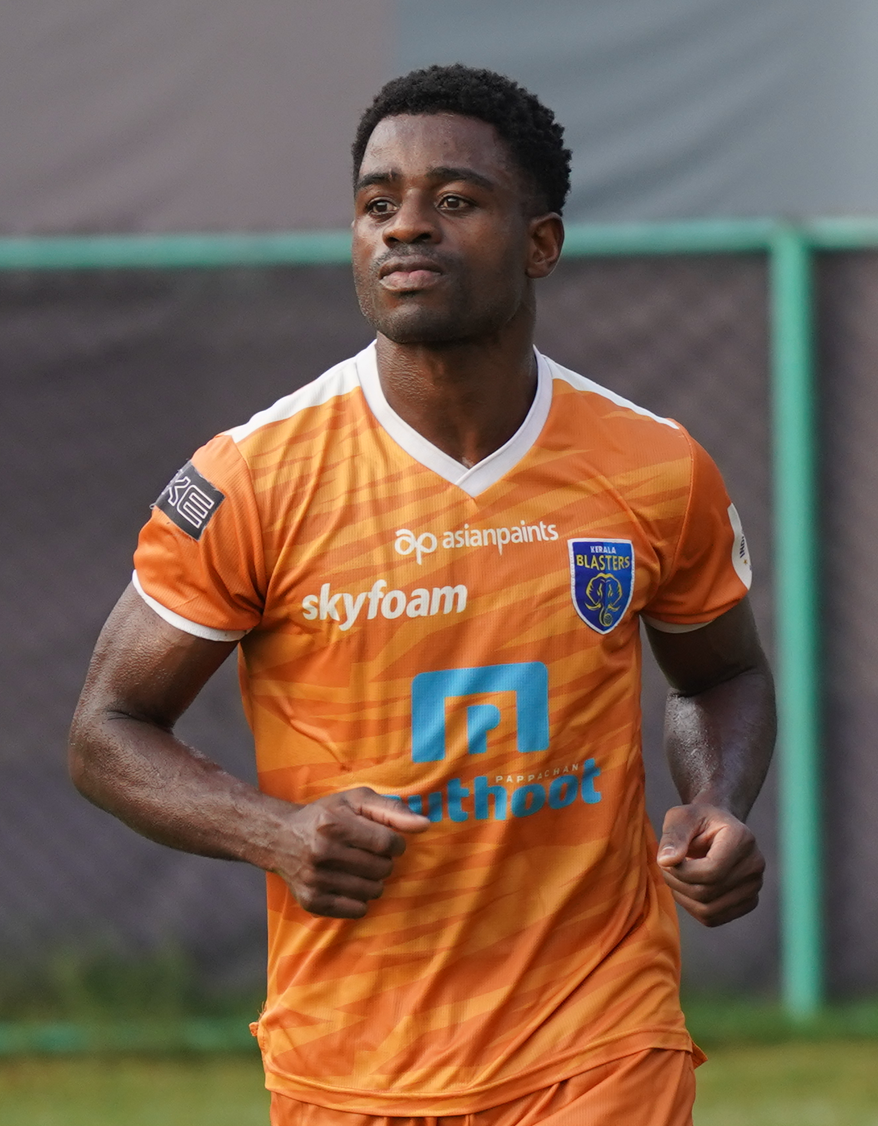
- Ogbeche with Kerala Blasters in 2020

Personal information
- Full name: Bartholomew Owogbalor Ogbeche
- Date of birth: 1 October 1984 (age 42)
- Place of birth: Ogoja, Nigeria
- Height: 1.80 m (5 ft 11 in)
- Position: Striker

Youth career
- Lobi Stars
- 1999–2001: Paris Saint-Germain

Senior career*
Years	Team	Apps	(Gls)
2001–2005	Paris Saint-Germain	57	(6)
2004	→ Bastia (loan)	15	(2)
2005	→ Metz (loan)	12	(1)
2005–2006	Al Jazira	16	(5)
2006–2007	Alavés	29	(5)
2007–2009	Valladolid	35	(3)
2009–2010	Cádiz	28	(9)
2010–2011	Kavala	19	(1)
2011–2012	Middlesbrough	17	(3)
2013	Xerez	8	(1)
2014–2016	Cambuur	57	(24)
2016–2018	Willem II	38	(12)
2018–2019	NorthEast United	18	(12)
2019–2020	Kerala Blasters	16	(15)
2020–2021	Mumbai City	23	(8)
2021–2023	Hyderabad	41	(28)
Total		429	(135)

International career
2002–2004	Nigeria	11	(3)
- * Club domestic league appearances and goals

Bartholomew Owogbalor Ogbeche (born 1 October 1984) is a Nigerian former professional footballer who played as a striker. He was the all-time top scorer in Indian Super League history until 2024.

Having started his career in France with Paris Saint-Germain, he played his club football in the United Arab Emirates, Spain, Greece, England, the Netherlands and India. He is the all-time top scorer for Hyderabad in the Indian Super League, having previously held the top scorer position for NorthEast United and Kerala Blasters.

Ogbeche represented Nigeria at the 2002 World Cup.

== Club career ==
Ogbeche was born in Ogoja. Still a youngster, he was signed by French Ligue 1 club Paris Saint-Germain, making his debut with the main squad during the 2001–02 season. However, he failed to settle, also suffering a thigh injury and serving two six-month loans to fellow league sides Bastia and Metz; for the former, he scored in a 4–1 home win against Marseille on 7 March 2004– the Corsicans secured their top-flight status, and he left PSG for good in June 2005.

After a brief time in the United Arab Emirates, Ogbeche moved to Spain, first with Alavés in Segunda División. Although he posted good individual numbers, the Basque team failed to return to La Liga but he joined another club in the former tier, Real Valladolid, making his debut on 26 August 2007 in a 1–0 away victory over Espanyol (12 minutes played).

In late August 2009, after two seasons of intermittent use, Ogbeche arranged a one-year deal with Andalusia's Cádiz of the second division. He finished the campaign as team top scorer, but they finished in 19th position and were relegated.

After one year in Greece with Kavala, Ogbeche joined Football League Championship side Middlesbrough on 18 October 2011, signing until the end of the season. He scored his first goal for his new club on 17 December, against Cardiff City in a 3–2 away win. On 5 March 2012, he came on as a substitute towards the end of the home game against Barnsley, lobbing the ball over Luke Steele for the final 2–0.

Ogbeche moved clubs and countries again in January 2014, signing for Cambuur in the Netherlands after a very brief spell back in Spain with Xerez. He scored once and provided an assist in his Eredivisie debut, helping to a 3–1 home defeat of Heerenveen.

On 25 August 2018, Ogbeche joined NorthEast United. He made his Indian Super League debut on 1 October, scoring once in the 2–2 draw against Goa. Later that month, he became the first player to manage a hat-trick during the campaign after achieving the feat in ten minutes away to Chennaiyin.

Ogbeche continued competing in the Indian top division the following years, with Kerala Blasters (becoming their all-time top scorer but being surpassed by Dimitrios Diamantakos in November 2023), Mumbai City and Hyderabad. On 31 January 2022, following a brace against NorthEast United, he became the competition's all-time top scorer at 49 goals; Hyderabad eventually won the championship, and he was also crowned top scorer.

On 29 September 2024, Sunil Chhetri scored his 64th ISL goal to surpass Ogbeche as the first in that individual department. The latter had announced his retirement aged 39 the previous year.

== International career ==
A Nigerian international from the age of 17, Ogbeche was selected for the 2002 FIFA World Cup, and appeared in two matches in a group-stage exit. He scored two of his three goals for the national side on 29 May 2004, in a 3–0 win against the Republic of Ireland in the Unity Cup in Charlton, London.

== Career statistics ==
=== Club ===
Appearances and goals by club, season and competition
Club	Season	League			Cup		Continental		Other		Total	
Club	Season	Division	Apps	Goals	Apps	Goals	Apps	Goals	Apps	Goals	Apps	Goals
Paris Saint-Germain	2001–02	Division 1	21	4	5 (Note: Two appearances in Coupe de France, three appearances and one goal in Coupe de la Ligue)	1	3 (Note: Appearances in UEFA Cup)	0	—		29	5
Paris Saint-Germain	2002–03	Ligue 1	18	1	4	0	2	0	—		24	1
Paris Saint-Germain	2003–04	Ligue 1	13	0	1	1	—		—		14	1
Paris Saint-Germain	2004–05	Ligue 1	5	1	3 (Note: One appearance in Coupe de France, two appearances in Coupe de la Ligue)	0	1 (Note: Appearance in UEFA Champions League)	0	—		9	1
Paris Saint-Germain	Total		57	6	13	2	6	0	—		76	8
Bastia (loan)	2003–04	Ligue 1	15	2	—		—		—		15	2
Metz (loan)	2004–05	Ligue 1	12	1	—		—		—		12	1
Al Jazira	2005–06	UAE Football League	16	5	—		—		—		16	5
Alavés	2006–07	Segunda División	29	5	2	0	—		—		31	5
Valladolid	2007–08	La Liga	19	2	4	1	—		—		23	3
Valladolid	2008–09	La Liga	16	1	4	2	—		—		20	3
Valladolid	Total		35	3	8	3	—		—		43	6
Cádiz	2009–10	Segunda División	28	9	—		—		—		28	9
Kavala	2010–11	Super League Greece	19	1	2	1	—		—		21	2
Middlesbrough	2011–12	Championship	17	3	1	0	—		—		18	3
Xerez	2012–13	Segunda División	8	1	—		—		—		8	1
Cambuur	2013–14	Eredivisie	10	2	—		—		—		10	2
Cambuur	2014–15	Eredivisie	31	13	2	1	—		—		33	14
Cambuur	2015–16	Eredivisie	16	9	1	2	—		—		17	11
Cambuur	Total		57	24	3	3	—		—		60	27
Willem II	2015–16	Eredivisie	4	1	—		—		—		4	1
Willem II	2016–17	Eredivisie	14	1	—		—		—		14	1
Willem II	2017–18	Eredivisie	20	10	3	1	—		—		23	11
Willem II	Total		38	12	3	1	—		—		41	13
NorthEast United	2018–19	Indian Super League	18	12	—		—		—		18	12
Kerala Blasters	2019–20	Indian Super League	16	15	—		—		—		16	15
Mumbai City	2020–21	Indian Super League	23	8	—		—		—		23	8
Hyderabad	2021–22	Indian Super League	20	18	—		—		—		20	18
Hyderabad	2022–23	Indian Super League	21	10	—		—		6 (Note: Appearances in Durand Cup)	5	27	15
Hyderabad	Total		41	28	—		—		6	5	47	33
Career total			429	135	32	10	6	0	6	5	473	150

=== International ===
Appearances and goals by national team, year and competition
Team	Year	Competitive		Friendly		Total	
Team	Year	Apps	Goals	Apps	Goals	Apps	Goals
Nigeria	2002	2 (Note: Appearances in FIFA World Cup)	0	4	0	6	0
Nigeria	2004	3 (Note: Appeences in FIFA World Cup qualification)	0	2 (Note: Appearances in Unity Cup)	3	5	3
Career total		5	0	6	3	11	3

Scores and results list Nigeria's goal tally first, score column indicates score after each Ogbeche goal.

List of international goals scored by Bartholomew Ogbeche
No.	Cap	Date	Venue	Opponent	Score	Result	Competition	Ref.
1	7	29 May 2004	The Valley, London, England	Republic of Ireland	1–0	3–0	2004 Unity Cup	
2	7	29 May 2004	The Valley, London, England	Republic of Ireland	3–0	3–0	2004 Unity Cup	
3	8	31 May 2004	The Valley, London, England	Jamaica	2–0	2–0	2004 Unity Cup	

== Honours ==
Mumbai City

- Indian Super League: 2020–21
- Indian Super League Winners Shield: 2020–21

Hyderabad

- Indian Super League: 2021–22

Nigeria

- Unity Cup: 2004

Individual

- Indian Super League Golden Boot: 2021–22
- Indian Super League Hero of the Month: January 2022
- Indian Super League top scorer (63 goals)
