= Juan Pablo Sorín =

Argentine footballer (born 1976)

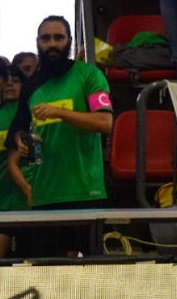

Personal information
- Full name: Juan Pablo Sorín
- Date of birth: 5 May 1976 (age 50)
- Place of birth: Buenos Aires, Argentina
- Height: 1.70 m (5 ft 7 in)
- Positions: Left-back; left midfielder

Youth career
- 1992–1994: Argentinos Juniors

Senior career*
Years	Team	Apps	(Gls)
1994–1995	Argentinos Juniors	20	(1)
1995–1996	Juventus	3	(0)
1996–1999	River Plate	138	(16)
2000–2004	Cruzeiro	121	(18)
2002–2003	→ Lazio (loan)	6	(0)
2003	→ Barcelona (loan)	15	(1)
2003–2004	→ Paris Saint-Germain (loan)	33	(2)
2004–2006	Villarreal	41	(8)
2006–2008	Hamburger SV	24	(4)
2008–2009	Cruzeiro	1	(0)
Total		402	(50)

International career
1995	Argentina U20	6	(0)
1995–2006	Argentina	75	(11)
Medal record
Men's football
Representing Argentina
FIFA U-20 World Cup
Winner	1995 Qatar
Pan American Games
Gold medal – first place	1995 Mar del Plata	Team
Copa América
Runner-up	2004 Peru
- * Club domestic league appearances and goals

Juan Pablo Sorín (born 5 May 1976) is an Argentine former footballer and current sports broadcaster, who played as a left-back or left midfielder. He had a successful club career in his native Argentina with River Plate, in Brazil with Cruzeiro, and with various teams in Europe, including Barcelona, Lazio, Paris Saint-Germain and Villarreal.

At international level, he earned 75 caps with Argentina, representing the team at two World Cups, two editions of Copa América and the 2005 FIFA Confederations Cup. He was the captain of Argentine side at the 2006 World Cup.

== Early and personal life ==
Sorín was born in Buenos Aires, Argentina, and is Jewish. He has written a book called Grandes Chicos ("Big Kids" or "Big Little People") to raise funds for the building of a school and a children's hospital in Argentina. He currently lives in Belo Horizonte, Brazil, and worked as a pundit for ESPN Brasil from 2012 to 2017.

== Club career ==
=== Early career ===
Nicknamed Juampi, as he is often known in Argentina, Sorín began his career playing in the lower-reaches of the Argentine league for Argentinos Juniors, a Buenos Aires football club. He broke into the first team in 1994 and during the 1995–96 season, after he captained the Argentina Under-20 side who won the 1995 FIFA World Youth Championship played in Qatar, his contract was bought by Italian club Juventus. However, he struggled to find space in an already established first-team under manager Marcello Lippi, totalling only four appearances for the club; as such, he soon returned to Argentina.He still ended up winning the Champions League with Juventus that same year.

Sorín played for River Plate in the second half of 1996, and revived his career, winning three Apertura championships (1996, 1997 and 1999), one Clausura championship (1997), one Copa Libertadores in 1996 and a Supercopa Sudamericana in 1997.

=== Cruzeiro and Lazio ===
He was transferred to Cruzeiro of Brazil in 2000. He played for two and a half seasons, winning the 2000 Copa do Brasil and becoming one of the most cherished players by the fans up to this day.

After the 2002 Copa do Brasil ended, he signed for Lazio on loan in July 2002.

=== Barcelona and PSG ===
After an injury-plagued half-season at Lazio in Italy, where he only played six league games, Sorin was acquired by Barcelona, occupying the non-EU quota along with Juan Román Riquelme and Roberto Bonano. He made his La Liga debut on 9 February 2003 in a 2–2 draw against Athletic Bilbao. In total, he made 15 appearances and scored one goal. He scored on the final matchday of the 2002–03 La Liga season in a 2–0 victory over Celta Vigo.

After a successful half-season, he left the Nou Camp in the summer of 2003 and was loaned out to Paris Saint-Germain, where he won the 2003–04 Coupe de France.

Sorín returned to Cruzeiro in 2004 and played the 2004 Campeonato Brasileiro Série A.

=== Villarreal ===
In November 2004, Sorín moved to Spanish side Villarreal on a free transfer. He scored his first goal for the club on 20 February 2005, a game-winner in the last minute of the game to give Villarreal a 3–2 victory against Atlético Madrid. He scored three more goals during the season to help Villarreal finish third in the league table for the 2004–05 season and earn qualification to the Champions League. In the 2005–06 league season, Sorín made 20 appearances and scored three goals. He made 13 appearances in the 2005–06 UEFA Champions League and scored a goal in the qualifying stages against Everton, helping the club reach the semi-finals, where they were beaten by Arsenal.

=== Hamburg ===
Sorín was reportedly the subject of interest from English Premiership sides Portsmouth, Bolton Wanderers and Newcastle United during the summer of 2006, but ended up signing for Hamburger SV in August 2006. He signed a three-year contract on a €3m transfer fee. After two years with the German club, and only 24 appearances because of injury, Sorín left when his contract expired on 15 July 2008.

=== Second Return to Cruzeiro and Retirement ===
Sorín returned again to Cruzeiro on 29 August 2008. He signed a contract until the end of season, with the option to renew for two more years. He played his only match since his return in a Série A game on 14 June 2009, and after another injury-riddled year with Cruzeiro, he announced his retirement on 28 July 2009.

== International career ==
Sorín made his Argentina debut in 1995. His first major tournament participation was at the 1999 Copa América, where Argentina were eliminated by eventual winners Brazil in the quarter-finals.

Sorín was part of the Argentine squad in the 2002 FIFA World Cup held in Japan and South Korea. He played and started all three matches against Nigeria, England and Sweden. After winning their opening match against Nigeria, the Argentine team lost a close match with England 1-0 and were only able to manage a draw with Sweden in their final group match and were eliminated early from the competition after being a pre-tournament favorite. In an underwhelming tournament for Argentina, Sorín stood out as one of Argentina's few bright spots.

Sorín played at the 2004 Copa América, scoring a goal in a 3–0 victory against Colombia. He started 5 out of 6 possible matches, missing the match against Uruguay. Argentina lost the final to Brazil 2–4 on penalties after a 2–2 draw following 90 minutes. The next year, Sorín played at the 2005 Confederations Cup. He played and started every match, as Argentina lost in the final to Brazil again 4–1.

The Argentine squad was then rebuilt by José Pekerman and Sorín was made captain of his country for the 2006 FIFA World Cup in Germany. Sorín played an important role in the World Cup for Argentina as an effective attacking full-back. Argentina qualified for the second round after taking care of Ivory Coast (2–1) and crushing Serbia and Montenegro 6–0. After defeating Mexico in extra time, Argentina went on to the quarter-finals where they lost to hosts Germany on a penalty-shoot out.

== Style of play ==
Sorín was a strong, versatile and hardworking left-back, who could also play as a centre-back or anywhere on the left wing, due to his passing and crossing ability with his left foot. He had an eccentric style of play, and despite being played predominantly in defensive roles, he often made attacking runs into more offensive positions, where he used his technical skills and aggressive heading ability to great effect.

== Career statistics ==
=== Club ===
Appearances and goals by club, season, and competition
Club	Season	League			National cup (Note: Includes Coppa Italia, Copa do Brasil, Copa del Rey, Coupe de France, DFB-Pokal)		Continental		Total	
Club	Season	Division	Apps	Goals	Apps	Goals	Apps	Goals	Apps	Goals
Argentinos Juniors	1994–95	Argentine Primera División	20	1					20	1
Juventus	1995–96	Serie A	2	0	2	0	1 (Note: Appearance(s) in UEFA Champions League)	0	5	0
River Plate	1996–97	Argentine Primera División	32	5			13	1	45	6
River Plate	1997–98	Argentine Primera División	21	4			2	0	23	4
River Plate	1998–99	Argentine Primera División	18	1			10	2	28	3
River Plate	1999–2000	Argentine Primera División	7	1			11	2	18	3
River Plate	Total		78	11			36	5	114	16
Cruzeiro	2000	Série A	14	3					14	3
Cruzeiro	2001	Série A	15	0			7 (Note: Appearances in Copa Libertadores)	1	22	1
Cruzeiro	2004	Série A	6	0					6	0
Cruzeiro	Total		35	3			7	1	42	4
Lazio (loan)	2002–03	Serie A	6	0	1	0	4 (Note: Appearances in UEFA Cup)	0	11	0
Barcelona (loan)	2002–03	La Liga	15	1	0	0	0	0	15	1
Paris Saint-Germain (loan)	2003–04	Ligue 1	21	1	5	1	–		26	2
Villarreal	2004–05	La Liga	21	4	0	0	6	0	27	4
Villarreal	2005–06	La Liga	20	3	0	0	13	1	33	4
Villarreal	Total		41	7	0	0	19	1	60	8
Hamburger SV	2006–07	Bundesliga	19	4	0	0	3	0	22	4
Hamburger SV	2007–08	Bundesliga	5	0	0	0	0	0	5	0
Hamburger SV	Total		24	4	0	0	3	0	27	4
Cruzeiro	2008	Série A	0	0					0	0
Cruzeiro	2009	Série A	1	0			1	0	2	0
Cruzeiro	Total		1	0			1	0	2	0
Career total			243	28	8	1	73	7	324	36

=== International ===
Appearances and goals by national team and year
National team	Year	Apps	Goals
Argentina	1995	3	0
Argentina	1996	2	1
Argentina	1997	2	0
Argentina	1998	0	0
Argentina	1999	10	2
Argentina	2000	7	0
Argentina	2001	8	2
Argentina	2002	7	2
Argentina	2003	3	0
Argentina	2004	14	3
Argentina	2005	14	0
Argentina	2006	5	1
Total		75	11

Scores and results list Argentina's goal tally first, score column indicates score after each Sorín goal.

List of international goals scored by Juan Pablo Sorín
No.	Date	Venue	Opponent	Score	Result	Competition
1	9 October 1996	Polideportivo de Pueblo Nuevo, San Cristóbal, Venezuela	Venezuela	2–1	5–2	1998 FIFA World Cup qualification
2	10 February 1999	Memorial Coliseum, Los Angeles, United States	Mexico	1–0	1–0	Friendly
3	11 July 1999	Estadio Antonio Oddone Sarubbi, Ciudad del Este, Paraguay	Brazil	1–0	1–2	1999 Copa América
4	28 March 2001	Estadio Monumental, Buenos Aires, Argentina	Venezuela	2–0	5–0	2002 FIFA World Cup qualification
5	25 April 2001	Estadio Hernando Siles, La Paz, Bolivia	Bolivia	3–3	3–3	2002 FIFA World Cup qualification
6	17 April 2002	Gottlieb-Daimler-Stadion, Stuttgart, Germany	Germany	1–0	1–0	Friendly
7	20 November 2002	Saitama Stadium 2002, Saitama, Japan	Japan	1–0	2–0	Friendly
8	2 June 2004	Mineirão, Belo Horizonte, Brazil	Brazil	1–2	1–3	2006 FIFA World Cup qualification
9	20 July 2004	Estadio Nacional, Lima, Peru	Colombia	3–0	3–0	2004 Copa América
10	4 September 2004	Estadio Monumental "U", Lima, Peru	Peru	3–1	3–1	2006 FIFA World Cup qualification
11	30 May 2006	Stadio Arechi, Salerno, Italy	Angola	2–0	2–0	Friendly

== Honours ==
Juventus

- UEFA Champions League: 1995–96

River Plate

- Argentine Primera División: 1996 Apertura, 1997 Clausura, 1997 Apertura, 1999 Apertura
- Copa Libertadores: 1996
- Intercontinental Cup runner-up: 1996
- Supercopa Libertadores: 1997

Cruzeiro

- Copa do Brasil: 2000
- Campeonato Mineiro: 2009
- Copa Sul-Minas: 2001, 2002

Paris Saint-Germain

- Coupe de France: 2003–04

Argentina

- FIFA World Youth Championship: 1995
- Pan American Games: 1995

Individual

- South American Team of the Year: 1996, 2000, 2001
- Bola de Prata: 2000
- UNFP Player of the Month: April 2004
- IFFHS Argentina All Times Dream Team (Team C): 2021

== See also ==
- List of select Jewish association football (soccer) players
