= Hakim Saci =

Algerian footballer (born 1977)

Personal information
- Full name: Hakim Saci
- Date of birth: 3 May 1977 (age 49)
- Place of birth: Saint-Denis, Paris, France
- Height: 1.78 m (5 ft 10 in)
- Position: Striker

Senior career*
Years	Team	Apps	(Gls)
1998–2001	Red Star 93	50	(13)
2001–2003	Guingamp	45	(6)
2003–2004	Metz	10	(1)
2005–2005	Grenoble	4	(0)
2005–2006	Cannes	29	(1)
2006–2008	Umm Salal		
2008	Boulogne	4	(0)
2008–2010	UJA Alfortville	41	(3)
2010–2012	Levallois SC		

International career
2000–2002	Algeria	3	(0)
- * Club domestic league appearances and goals

Hakim Saci (born 3 May 1977) is a former professional footballer who played as a striker. He played for En Avant de Guingamp and FC Metz in Ligue 1. (Note: Hakim Saci – French league stats at LFP – also available in French (archived)) He began his professional career at Red Star 93, a club in France. He also played for Grenoble, AS Cannes, Umm Salal, US Boulogne and UJA Alfortville. Born in France, he represented Algeria at international level.

== Career statistics ==
Appearances and goals by national team and year
National team	Year	Apps	Goals
Algeria	2000	2	0
Algeria	2001	0	0
Algeria	2002	1	0
Total		3	0
