= Stéphane Gillet =

Luxembourgish footballer (born 1977)

Personal information
- Full name: Stéphane Gillet
- Date of birth: 20 August 1977 (age 49)
- Place of birth: Luxembourg City, Luxembourg
- Height: 1.90 m (6 ft 3 in)
- Position: Goalkeeper

Youth career
- FC Marisa Mersch

Senior career*
Years	Team	Apps	(Gls)
1995–1998	Standard Liège	0	(0)
1998–1999	Spora Luxembourg	20	(0)
1999–2001	SV Elversberg	46	(0)
2001	Paris Saint-Germain	1	(0)
2002–2003	Paris Saint-Germain II	27	(0)
2003–2004	FC Wil		
2004–2005	Union Luxembourg	18	(0)
2005–2006	Racing FC Luxembourg	17	(0)
2006	Chester City	8	(0)
2006–2007	Racing FC Luxembourg	17	(0)
2007–2008	Jeunesse Esch	18	(0)
2009–2010	SC Steinfort		

International career^{‡}
2000–2006	Luxembourg	20	(0)
- * Club domestic league appearances and goals as of 20 July 2008 ‡ National team caps and goals as of 25 February 2009

Stéphane Gillet (born 20 August 1977) was a Luxembourgish footballer. He played in goal twenty times for Luxembourg. He has played for clubs in several countries, including Jeunesse Esch and Racing FC Union Luxembourg in Luxembourg, Chester City in England, SV Elversberg in Germany, and FC Wil in Switzerland.

== Club career ==
Gillet started his career with Belgian side Standard Liège but made his senior debut with Luxembourg outfit Spora Luxembourg in the 1998/1999 season. He was then lured away by German Regionalliga Süd side SV Elversberg where he spent two seasons before moving to French giants Paris Saint-Germain as the team's third goalkeeper. Although he played for the return leg of the second round of the 2001/2002 UEFA Cup, he spent most of his time in the reserves. He joined Swiss Superleague team FC Wil in 2003 and experienced relegation as well as winning the Swiss Cup with them. After that season he returned to Luxembourg but had a two-month spell with English lower league team Chester City.

In 2007, Gillet was contracted to Jeunesse Esch for three years.

He has joined Rugby Club Luxembourg, for whose second team he plays as a back row.

== International career ==
Gillet made his debut for Luxembourg in an October 2000 World Cup qualification match against Russia. He went on to earn 20 caps. He played in 8 World Cup qualification matches.

He played his final international match in November 2006 against Togo.

== Career statistics ==
=== International ===
Appearances and goals by national team and year
National team	Year	Apps	Goals
Luxembourg	2000	1	0
Luxembourg	2001	6	0
Luxembourg	2002	5	0
Luxembourg	2003	1	0
Luxembourg	2004	–	
Luxembourg	2005	3	0
Luxembourg	2006	4	0
Total		20	0

== Honours ==
- Swiss Cup: 1

2004
