= Stéphane Pédron =

French footballer (born 1971)

Stéphane Pedron
- Stéphane Pédron in 1998.

Personal information
- Date of birth: 20 February 1971 (age 55)
- Place of birth: Redon, France
- Height: 1.76 m (5 ft 9 in)
- Position: Midfielder

Youth career
- 1977–1990: Saint-Nazaire OS

Senior career*
Years	Team	Apps	(Gls)
1990–1993	GS Saint Sébastien		
1993–1994	RC Ancenis	30	(14)
1994–1997	Laval	107	(14)
1997–1999	Lorient	74	(16)
1999–2001	Saint-Étienne	65	(12)
2001–2003	Lens	46	(6)
2003	→ Paris Saint-Germain (loan)	13	(2)
2003–2007	Lorient	83	(5)
Total		388	(55)

International career
1998	Brittany	1	(0)
- * Club domestic league appearances and goals

Stéphane Pedron (born 20 February 1971) is a French former professional footballer who played as a midfielder.

== Career ==
Pedron was voted 1997–98 French Division 2 Player of the Season after helping Lorient to promotion.

Pedron retired from football following the expiry of his contract with Lorient after the 2006–07 season. Afterwards, he joined the technical staff of the club alongside Christophe Le Roux.
