= Lionel Potillon =

French footballer (born 1974)

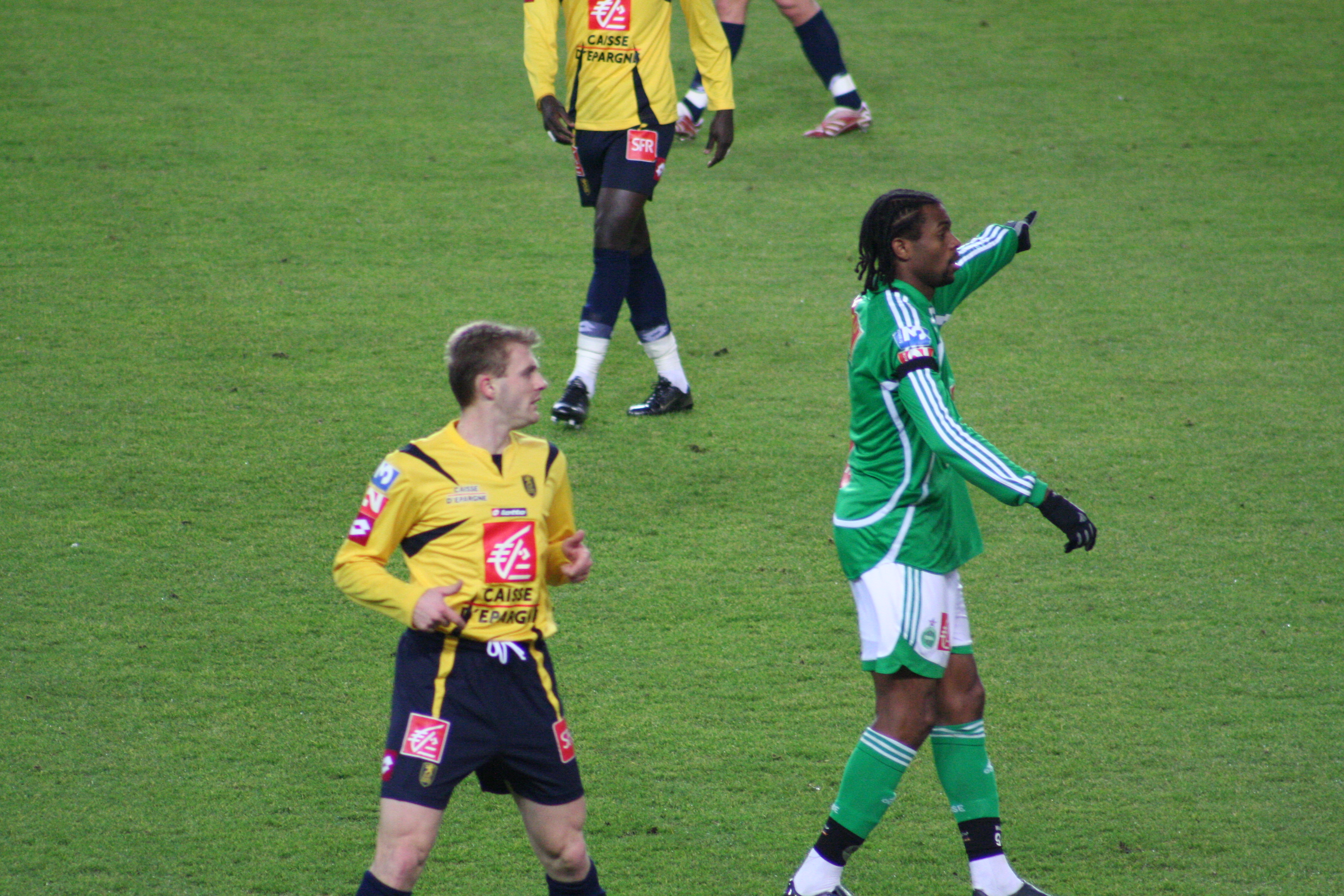
- Lionel Potillon (left)

Personal information
- Date of birth: 10 February 1974 (age 52)
- Place of birth: Cluny, France
- Height: 1.79 m (5 ft 10 in)
- Position: Left-back

Youth career
- Louhans-Cuiseaux

Senior career*
| Years | Team | Apps | (Gls) |
| 1991–1993 | Louhans-Cuiseaux | 0 | (0) |
| 1993–2001 | Saint-Étienne | 190 | (9) |
| 2001–2003 | Paris Saint-Germain | 53 | (0) |
| 2003–2004 | Real Sociedad | 20 | (0) |
| 2004–2007 | Sochaux | 35 | (1) |
- * Club domestic league appearances and goals

Lionel Potillon (born 10 February 1974) is a retired French football defender.

== Honours ==
Paris Saint-Germain

- UEFA Intertoto Cup: 2001

Sochaux

- Coupe de France: 2006–07
