= Talal El Karkouri =

Moroccan footballer (born 1976)

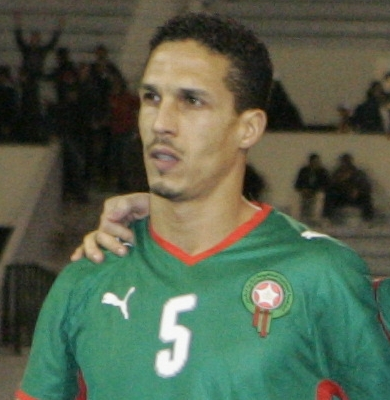
- El Karkouri lining up for Morocco in 2009

Personal information
- Date of birth: 8 July 1976 (age 50)
- Place of birth: Casablanca, Morocco
- Height: 1.86 m (6 ft 1 in)
- Position: Centre-back

Senior career*
Years	Team	Apps	(Gls)
1994–1999	Raja Casablanca	?	(?)
1995–1997	→ Ittihad Tanger (loan)	?	(?)
1999–2000	Servette	77	(1)
2000–2004	Paris Saint-Germain	113	(2)
2000–2001	→ Aris (loan)	11	(0)
2003	→ Sunderland (loan)	8	(0)
2004–2007	Charlton Athletic	78	(8)
2006	→ Al-Gharafa (loan)	?	(?)
2007–2011	Qatar SC	77	(12)
2011–2012	Umm-Salal	?	(?)
Total		364	(23)

International career
2000–2009	Morocco	53	(5)

Managerial career
- 2016–2018: Umm Salal SC
- 2023: Umm Salal SC
- * Club domestic league appearances and goals

Talal El Karkouri (Arabic: طلال القرقوري, born 8 July 1976) is a Moroccan former professional footballer and former coach of Qatar Stars League club Umm Salal SC. He played top-flight football in Morocco, France, Greece, England and Qatar before retiring in 2012. He made his international debut for Morocco in 2000, and earned 53 caps, playing at three African Cups of Nations.

== Club career ==
=== Early career ===
Born in Casablanca, El Karkouri started his career with Raja Casablanca, and was discovered by French club Paris Saint-Germain in 2000. He played in the UEFA Cup and UEFA Champions League, but after failing to capture a regular place he was sent on loan to Aris in Greece.

On 31 January 2003 he was loaned to Sunderland of the Premier League until the end of the season. His spell was affected by injury, and he was released on 26 May after the club were relegated. The Black Cats lost in all eight of his appearances.

=== Charlton ===
In the summer of 2004, he was bought by Charlton Athletic of the Premier League for £1 million. He scored five goals in his debut season at Charlton, starting with the only goal in a win over Blackburn Rovers on 27 September 2004, by heading Danny Murphy's corner. He also scored the club's goal of the season against Arsenal.

On 6 April 2006, having made only 12 appearances all season, he was loaned to Al-Gharafa in Qatar.

On 30 December 2006, El Karkouri was given a yellow card by referee Rob Styles for an act of simulation in a home match against Aston Villa involving Villa defender Olof Mellberg. He was accused of a similar act against Reading on 9 April 2007 later in the same season, this time involving Reading striker Leroy Lita, who headbutted him.

Reading boss Steve Coppell accused El Karkouri of faking a 'death roll' and claimed that he would have needed treatment in intensive care had Lita headbutted him. Lita urged the FA to do something about 'diving cheats' after being hit with the ban. He said "I didn't touch him, he went down like an idiot and it was cheating". The FA disagreed and banned the Reading striker for three games for violent conduct. Coppell did not apologise for his comments.

=== Qatar ===
On 10 June 2007, following his release and Charlton's relegation, El Karkouri signed a two-year contract with Qatar Sports Club.

On 11 September 2011, after four seasons with Qatar SC, El Karkouri signed a one-year deal with another Qatari club, Umm-Salal.

On 25 May 2012, El Karkouri announced his retirement from professional football.

== International career ==
El Karkouri was capped 53 times and scored 5 goals for Morocco. He was part of the team that finished second in the 2004 African Nations Cup.

On 29 January 2008, he announced his retirement from international football, after his team's failure to qualify for the latter stages of the 2008 African Nations Cup, but he returned on 28 March 2009 playing the 2010 World Cup qualifications match against Gabon in Casablanca.

== Career statistics ==
=== International ===
Appearances and goals by national team and year
National team	Year	Apps	Goals
Morocco	2000	4	0
Morocco	2001	0	0
Morocco	2002	4	0
Morocco	2003	10	0
Morocco	2004	11	2
Morocco	2005	5	2
Morocco	2006	11	0
Morocco	2007	5	1
Morocco	2008	1	0
Morocco	2009	2	0
Total		53	5

Morocco score listed first, score column indicates score after each El Karkouri goal.

List of international goals scored by Talal El Karkouri
No.	Date	Venue	Opponent	Score	Result	Competition	Ref.
1	31 January 2004	Stade Taïeb El Mhiri, Sfax, Tunisia	Benin	4–0	4–0	2004 Africa Cup of Nations	
2	4 September 2004	Prince Moulay Abdellah Stadium, Rabat, Morocco	Tunisia	1–1	1–1	2006 FIFA World Cup qualification	
3	3 September 2005	Prince Moulay Abdellah Stadium, Rabat, Morocco	Botswana	1–0	1–0	2006 FIFA World Cup qualification	
4	8 October 2005	Stade 7 November, Radès, Tunisia	Tunisia	2–1	2–2	2006 FIFA World Cup qualification	
5	17 October 2007	Prince Moulay Abdellah Stadium, Rabat, Morocco	Namibia	2–0	2–0	Friendly	

== Honours ==
Paris Saint-Germain

- UEFA Intertoto Cup: 2001
- Coupe de France: 2003–04

Morocco

- Africa Cup of Nations runner-up: 2004
