= Frédéric Déhu =

French footballer (born 1972)

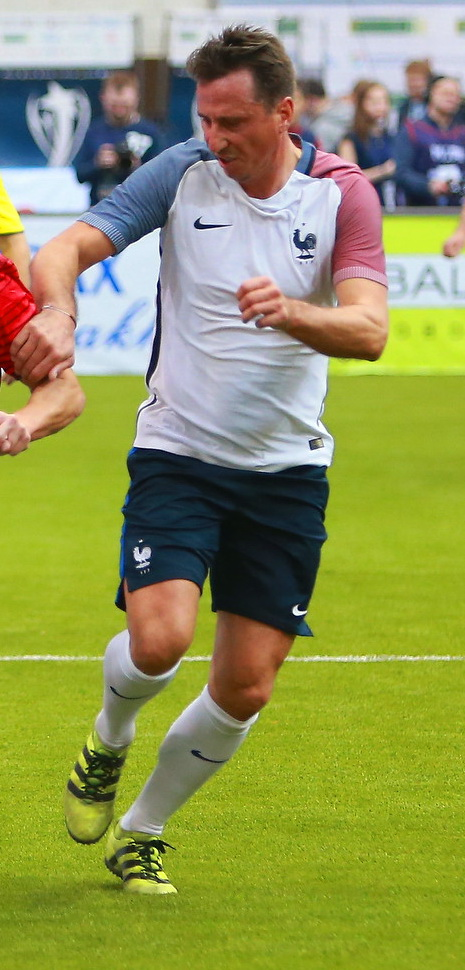
- Déhu in 2018

Personal information
- Full name: Frédéric Fabian William Déhu
- Date of birth: 24 October 1972 (age 54)
- Place of birth: Villeparisis, Seine-et-Marne, France
- Height: 1.86 m (6 ft 1 in)
- Position: Centre-back

Senior career*
Years	Team	Apps	(Gls)
1991–1999	Lens	229	(15)
1999–2000	Barcelona	11	(0)
2000–2004	Paris Saint-Germain	118	(6)
2004–2006	Marseille	57	(1)
2006–2007	Levante	12	(1)
Total		427	(23)

International career
1998–2000	France	5	(0)
- * Club domestic league appearances and goals

Frédéric Fabian William Déhu (born 24 October 1972) is a French former professional footballer who played as a centre-back.

== Club career ==
Born in Villeparisis, Seine-et-Marne, Déhu made his professional debut with RC Lens, becoming an undisputed starter from his third season onwards. In 1996–97 he scored a career-best five goals, but the club could only rank 13th; in the following year, he was an essential defensive unit as his team won their first Ligue 1 title.

In summer 1999, after nearly 300 official appearances for Lens, Déhu signed with La Liga giants FC Barcelona, but he played just 23 matches across all competitions for the Louis van Gaal-led side, being released by the Catalans at the end of the campaign and netting his only goal to help defeat AIK Fotboll 5–0 in the group stage of the UEFA Champions League. He then returned to his country and joined Paris Saint-Germain F.C. for about €6 million, remaining four years in the capital and winning the Coupe de France in his final one.

At nearly 32, Déhu moved to Olympique de Marseille and, after two years, he returned to Spain, signing with lowly Levante UD. As in his previous abroad adventure he was sparingly used, also being sent off twice in home matches against Real Madrid (4–1 loss) and Recreativo de Huelva (2–1 win), as the Valencian Community side narrowly avoided top flight relegation.

Amidst accusations of poor organization in the structure of his last club, Déhu retired from the game in March 2008 aged almost 36, after spending the first months of the new campaign without a team.

== International career ==
In two years, Déhu won five caps for the France national team. His debut was on 19 August 1998, in a 2–2 friendly draw to Austria played in Vienna.

== Honours ==
Lens

- Division 1: 1997–98
- Coupe de la Ligue: 1998–99

Paris Saint-Germain

- Coupe de France: 2003–04
- UEFA Intertoto Cup: 2001
