= Jérôme Alonzo =

French footballer (born 1972)

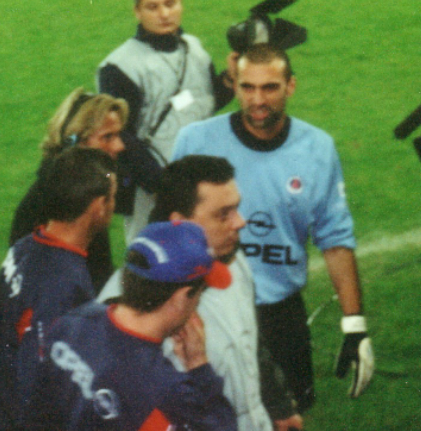
- Alonzo with Paris Saint-Germain in 2002

Personal information
- Full name: Jérôme Sébastien Alonzo
- Date of birth: 20 November 1972 (age 53)
- Place of birth: Menton, Alpes-Maritimes, France
- Height: 1.85 m (6 ft 1 in)
- Position: Goalkeeper

Senior career*
Years	Team	Apps	(Gls)
1990–1995	Nice	7	(0)
1995–1997	Marseille	45	(0)
1997–2001	Saint-Étienne	100	(0)
2001–2008	Paris Saint-Germain	71	(0)
2008–2011	Nantes	22	(0)
Total		245	(0)
- * Club domestic league appearances and goals

Jérôme Sébastien Alonzo (born 20 November 1972) is a French former professional footballer who played as a goalkeeper.

== Honours ==
Nice

- Division 2: 1993–94

Paris Saint-Germain

- UEFA Intertoto Cup: 2001
- Coupe de France: 2005–06
- Coupe de la Ligue: 2007–08
