= Fabrice Fiorèse =

French footballer (born 1975)

Personal information
- Full name: Fabrice Fiorèse
- Date of birth: 26 July 1975 (age 51)
- Place of birth: Chambéry, France
- Height: 1.75 m (5 ft 9 in)
- Positions: Forward; winger

Youth career
- –1996: Lyon

Senior career*
Years	Team	Apps	(Gls)
1996–1997	Lyon	2	(0)
1997–2002	Guingamp	111	(37)
2002	→ Paris Saint-Germain (loan)	12	(3)
2002–2004	Paris Saint-Germain	69	(11)
2004–2008	Marseille	18	(2)
2005–2006	→ Al-Rayyan (loan)		
2006–2007	→ Lorient (loan)	7	(2)
2008	Amiens	16	(3)
2008–2009	Troyes	24	(4)
Total		259+	(62+)
- * Club domestic league appearances and goals

Fabrice Fiorèse (born 26 July 1975) is a French former professional footballer who played as a forward and winger.

== Honours ==
Paris Saint-Germain

- Coupe de France: 2003–04
