= Hugo Leal (footballer) =

Portuguese footballer

Personal information
- Full name: Hugo Miguel Ribeiro Leal
- Date of birth: 21 May 1980 (age 46)
- Place of birth: Cascais, Portugal
- Height: 1.80 m (5 ft 11 in)
- Position: Central midfielder

Youth career
- 1989–1991: Alcabideche
- 1991–1992: Estoril
- 1992–1997: Benfica

Senior career*
Years	Team	Apps	(Gls)
1997–1999	Benfica	33	(3)
1997–1998	→ Alverca (loan)	20	(3)
1999–2001	Atlético Madrid	59	(5)
2001–2004	Paris Saint-Germain	53	(1)
2004–2005	Porto	7	(0)
2005	→ Académica (loan)	12	(0)
2005–2007	Braga	17	(0)
2007–2008	Belenenses	8	(0)
2008–2009	Trofense	21	(3)
2009–2010	Salamanca	36	(1)
2010–2012	Vitória Setúbal	45	(2)
2012–2013	Estoril	6	(0)
Total		317	(18)

International career
1995	Portugal U15	8	(2)
1995–1996	Portugal U16	13	(2)
1997	Portugal U17	5	(0)
1996–1998	Portugal U18	28	(1)
1999	Portugal U20	7	(0)
1998–2002	Portugal U21	20	(4)
2001	Portugal B	1	(1)
1999	Portugal	1	(0)

Managerial career
- 2015: Estoril
Medal record
Men's football
Representing Portugal
UEFA European Under-16 Championship
Winner	1995 Belgium
Winner	1996 Austria
- * Club domestic league appearances and goals

Hugo Miguel Ribeiro Leal (born 21 May 1980) is a Portuguese former professional footballer who played as a central midfielder. He was also a reliable set piece taker.

He amassed Primeira Liga totals of 148 matches and nine goals over 11 seasons, having started his career with Benfica. He also played professionally, albeit with little impact in the countries' top division, in Spain and France.

Leal played once with the Portugal national team.

== Club career ==
Born in the Lisbon outskirts of Cascais, Leal started his career with local Benfica and, not yet 17, made his Primeira Liga debut against Espinho, in a 2–0 home win on 20 April 1997. He made his breakthrough in the 1998–99 season, playing 27 league games and scoring three goals; in between, he served a loan stint at Benfica's farm team Alverca, at the time also in the top division.

In the summer of 1999, Leal moved abroad with Spain's Atlético Madrid. In his first year the club was relegated to the Segunda División, and in his only goal he was also sent off, in a 13 May 2000 home draw against Sevilla. He stayed for the following campaign but could not help the Colchoneros win promotion back into La Liga, although he had established in the starting XI (36 matches, four goals).

Leal joined Paris Saint-Germain in 2001, helping the capital side to two French Cup finals in consecutive years. However, on 8 March 2002, in a match against Lorient for that competition, he suffered a serious injury to his left knee, being sidelined for the rest of the campaign after undergoing surgery and also missing that year's UEFA European Under-21 Championship; his playing time was gradually cut, and a mutual contract termination was agreed on 4 August 2004.

In August 2004, Leal signed a four-year contract with Porto. He spent six months with the team before moving to Académica de Coimbra on loan as he did not get enough playing time; at this point, he seriously consider ending his playing career.

For 2005–06, Leal moved to Braga, but left the club by mutual agreement in January 2007 after totalling only 17 league appearances in nearly two seasons. In August, he returned to Lisbon and joined Belenenses in a one-year deal, in another campaign severely cut short due to injuries.

Leal agreed to a one-year contract with newly promoted Trofense in late October 2008. Following their top-flight relegation, he returned to Spain after eight years, joining Salamanca of the second tier in a one year deal, which would be extended for a second year only if promotion was attained.

During his only season with the Castile and León side, Leal was an undisputed starter, but not only did they not promote but almost suffered relegation. The 30-year-old returned to his country in late July 2010, signing for Vitória de Setúbal. In his third game, at former club Benfica, he missed a penalty kick to equalise the score after the opponents had just been reduced to ten men, and Vitória eventually lost 3–0.

On 5 June 2012, the 32-year-old Leal returned to Estoril after 21 years, on a one-year contract. In March 2015, following José Couceiro's departure, both he – who worked for his former youth club in the board of directors– and former assistant Fabiano took the reins until the end of the campaign, eventually leading the team to the 12th position in the top flight; in July, the former was appointed the sole head coach.

== International career ==
Leal participated with the Portuguese under-20 team in the 1999 FIFA World Youth Championship held in Nigeria, exiting in the round of 16 following a penalty shootout loss to Japan (1–1 after 120 minutes). He also helped the under-16 side win the 1995 and the 1996 UEFA European Under-16 Championships.

Aged 18, Leal earned one cap for the full side, a 0–0 draw with the Netherlands in Paris on 19 February 1999.

== Career statistics ==
Appearances and goals by club, season and competition
Club	Season	League			Cup (Note: Includes Copa del Rey, Coupe de la Ligue, Coupe de France and Taça de Portugal)		Continental (Note: Includes UEFA Champions League, UEFA Cup and UEFA Super Cup)		Total	
Club	Season	Division	Apps	Goals	Apps	Goals	Apps	Goals	Apps	Goals
Benfica	1996–97	Primeira Liga	2	0	–		–		2	0
Benfica	1997–98	Primeira Liga	4	0	–		–		4	0
Benfica	1998–99	Primeira Liga	27	3	–		6	0	33	3
Benfica	Total		33	3	0	0	6	0	39	3
Atlético Madrid	1999–2000	La Liga	23	1	6	1	5	0	34	2
Atlético Madrid	2000–01	Segunda División	36	4	7	0	–		43	4
Atlético Madrid	Total		59	5	13	1	5	0	77	6
Paris Saint-Germain	2001–02	Ligue 1	21	1	5	0	5	1	31	2
Paris Saint-Germain	2002–03	Ligue 1	18	0	5	1	2	0	25	1
Paris Saint-Germain	2003–04	Ligue 1	14	0	5	0	–		19	0
Paris Saint-Germain	Total		53	1	15	1	7	1	75	3
Porto	2004–05	Primeira Liga	7	0	–		2	0	9	0
Académica (loan)	2004–05	Primeira Liga	12	0	–		–		12	0
Braga	2005–06	Primeira Liga	12	0	–		1	0	13	0
Braga	2006–07	Primeira Liga	5	0	–		3	0	8	0
Braga	Total		17	0	0	0	4	0	21	0
Belenenses	2007–08	Primeira Liga	8	0	–		–		8	0
Trofense	2008–09	Primeira Liga	21	3	–		–		21	3
Salamanca	2009–10	Segunda División	36	1	1	0	–		37	1
Vitória Setúbal	2010–11	Primeira Liga	24	1	1	0	–		25	1
Vitória Setúbal	2011–12	Primeira Liga	21	1	–		–		21	1
Vitória Setúbal	Total		45	2	1	0	0	0	46	1
Estoril	2012–13	Primeira Liga	6	0	–		–		6	0
Career total			297	15	30	2	22	1	349	18

== Honours ==
Paris Saint-Germain

- Coupe de France: 2003–04; runner-up: 2002–03
- UEFA Intertoto Cup: 2001

Porto

- Supertaça Cândido de Oliveira: 2004

Portugal

- UEFA European Under-16 Championship: 1995, 1996
