= Jérôme Leroy (footballer) =

French footballer (born 1974)

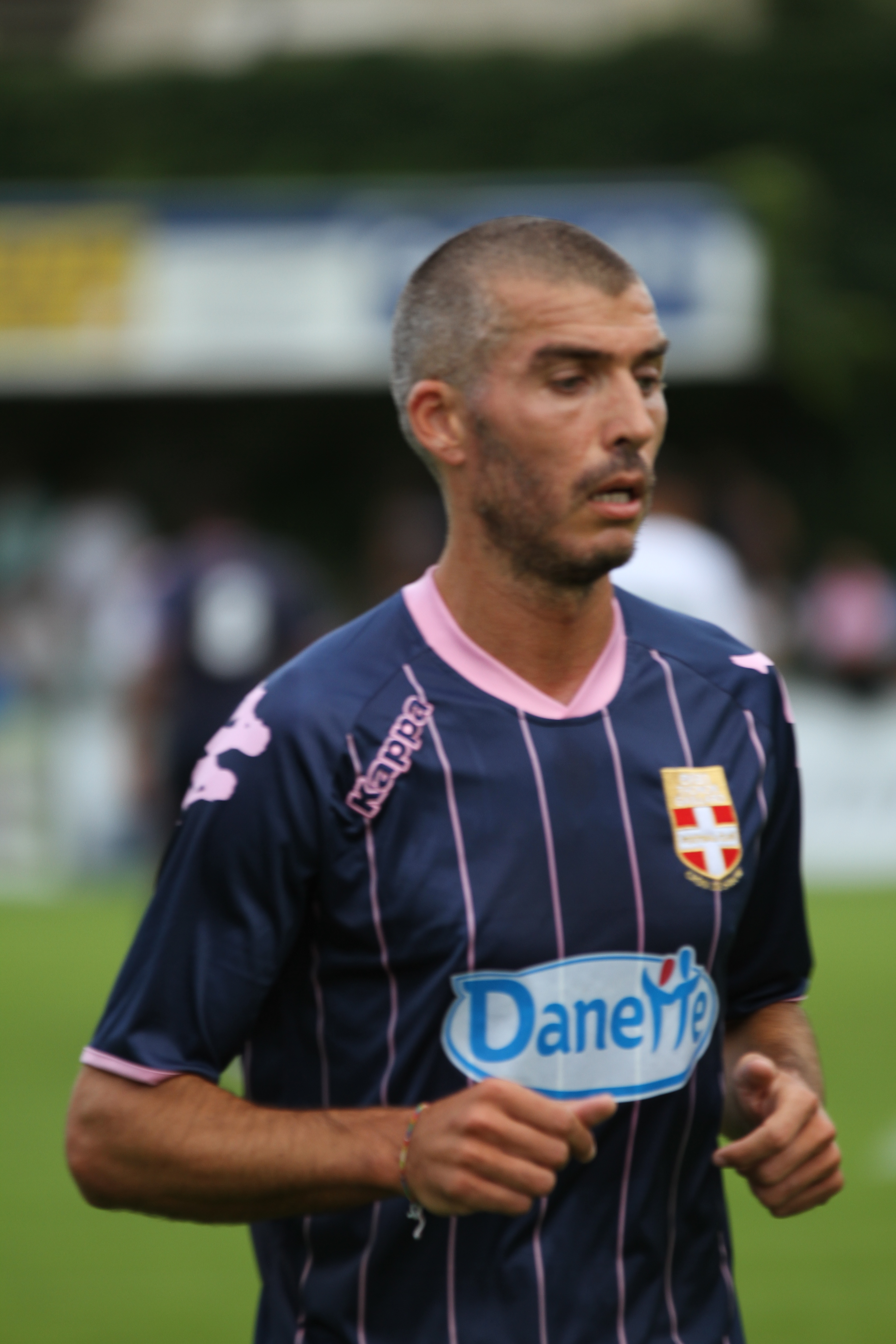
- Leroy with Evian in 2011

Personal information
- Date of birth: 4 November 1974 (age 52)
- Place of birth: Béthune, France
- Height: 1.83 m (6 ft 0 in)
- Position: Attacking midfielder

Youth career
- ?–1994: Paris Saint-Germain

Senior career*
Years	Team	Apps	(Gls)
1994–1999	Paris Saint-Germain	73	(2)
1995–1996	→ Laval (loan)	39	(4)
2000–2001	Marseille	47	(7)
2002–2003	Paris Saint-Germain	48	(8)
2003–2004	Guingamp	28	(5)
2004–2005	Lens	46	(3)
2006	Beitar Jerusalem	15	(2)
2006–2007	Sochaux	30	(3)
2007–2011	Rennes	127	(13)
2011–2012	Evian	19	(4)
2013–2014	Istres	35	(8)
2014–2015	Le Havre	12	(2)
2015	Châteauroux	5	(0)
Total		524	(61)

Managerial career
- 2015–2020: Châteauroux (sports director)
- 2020–2021: Châteauroux (sports director)
- * Club domestic league appearances and goals

Jérôme Leroy (born 4 November 1974) is a French former professional footballer who played as an attacking midfielder.

== Playing career ==
Born in Béthune, Pas-de-Calais, Leroy started playing for Paris Saint-Germain. With PSG he participated in the final of the 1997 Cup Winners' Cup which was lost to Barcelona. During the 1995–96 season he joined Laval on loan.

Following a stint at Marseille, he returned to PSG, where he reached the 2003 French Cup final.

He moved to Guingamp during the 2003–04 winter transfer window.

Luis Fernández, Leroy's former mentor at Paris Saint-Germain, brought him to Teddy Stadium, home to Beitar Jerusalem, in December 2005 from Ligue 1 club Lens, beating off competition from l'OM. On 25 June 2006, Beitar took off from Ben Gurion International Airport on an El Al flight to the Netherlands for preseason training. Leroy chose not to join the team opting to check options of staying in France for the 2006–07 season. A deal with Sochaux was ultimately arranged.

With Sochaux he won the 2006–07 Coupe de France. The game finished 2–2 and went to penalties, and Leroy scored his penalty in the shootout as his side emerged victorious.

For 2007–08, Leroy joined Rennes, where he was dubbed "Leroy (le roi, "the king") de la passe" (king of assists). He stayed in Rennes until 2011.

In 2011, Leroy moved to newly promoted Ligue 1 club Évian after signing a one-year contract on 5 July 2011. He spent one season with Évian.

On 29 June 2013, after one year without a club, Leroy joined Ligue 2 side Istres. A year later, he signed a one-year contract with Le Havre.

In January 2015, he signed for Châteauroux.

== Post-playing career ==
Following his retirement, Leroy became sports director of his last club, Châteauroux. He left this position in June 2020. However, he was re-appointed in December 2020. He left again in 2021.

== Personal life ==
Leroy's son Léo Leroy is also a professional footballer.

== Career statistics ==
Appearances and goals by club, season and competition
Club	Season	League			National cup		League cup		Europe		Total	
Club	Season	Division	Apps	Goals	Apps	Goals	Apps	Goals	Apps	Goals	Apps	Goals
Laval (loan)	1995–96	National 2	39	4	0	0	0	0	0	0	39	4
Paris Saint-Germain	1996–97	Division 1	21	0	0	0	0	0	8	1	29	1
Paris Saint-Germain	1997–98	Division 1	24	1	0	0	0	0	7	1	31	2
Paris Saint-Germain	1998–99	Division 1	21	1	2	0	3	0	1	0	27	1
Paris Saint-Germain	1999–2000	Division 1	7	0	0	0	0	0	0	0	7	0
Paris Saint-Germain	Total		73	2	2	0	3	0	16	2	94	4
Marseille	1999–2000	Division 1	11	2	2	0	1	0	4	1	18	3
Marseille	2000–01	Division 1	29	4	1	0	0	0	0	0	30	4
Marseille	2001–02	Division 1	7	1	0	0	2	0	0	0	9	1
Marseille	Total		47	7	3	0	3	0	4	1	57	8
Paris Saint-Germain	2001–02	Ligue 1	11	2	3	0	2	0	0	0	16	2
Paris Saint-Germain	2002–03	Ligue 1	33	5	6	0	1	0	4	0	44	5
Paris Saint-Germain	2003–04	Ligue 1	4	1	0	0	0	0	0	0	4	1
Paris Saint-Germain	Total		48	8	9	0	3	0	4	0	64	8
Guingamp	2003–04	Ligue 1	28	5	0	0	1	0	0	0	29	5
Lens	2004–05	Ligue 1	31	3	2	0	2	0	0	0	35	3
Lens	2005–06	Ligue 1	15	0	0	0	1	0	2	0	18	0
Lens	Total		46	3	2	0	3	0	2	0	53	3
Beitar Jerusalem	2005–06	Israeli Premier League	15	2	0	0	0	0	0	0	15	2
Sochaux	2006–07	Ligue 1	30	3	5	1	1	0	0	0	36	4
Rennes	2007–08	Ligue 1	31	6	1	0	1	0	5	2	38	8
Rennes	2008–09	Ligue 1	30	0	5	0	1	0	4	2	40	2
Rennes	2009–10	Ligue 1	32	5	2	0	1	0	0	0	35	5
Rennes	2010–11	Ligue 1	34	2	2	2	1	0	0	0	37	4
Rennes	Total		127	13	10	2	4	0	9	4	150	19
Evian	2011–12	Ligue 1	19	4	0	0	1	0	0	0	20	4
Istres	2013–14	Ligue 2	35	8	3	0	1	0	0	0	39	8
Le Havre	2014–15	Ligue 2	12	2	0	0	0	0	0	0	12	2
Châteauroux	2014–15	Ligue 2	5	0	0	0	0	0	0	0	5	0
Career total			524	61	34	3	20	0	35	7	613	71

== Honours ==
Paris Saint-Germain

- Trophée des Champions: 1998

Lens

- UEFA Intertoto Cup: 2005

Sochaux

- Coupe de France: 2006–07
