= List of Paris Saint-Germain FC players =

Paris Saint-Germain FC have competed in numerous domestic and international competitions since their foundation, with 528 players featuring in at least one official match for the club. These include club greats such as record appearance holder Marquinhos, all-time top scorer Kylian Mbappé, assist leader Ángel Di María, clean sheet record holder Bernard Lama, longest-serving captain Thiago Silva, Ballon d'Or winner Ousmane Dembélé, and world-record transfer signing Neymar. Other players who made 100 or more competitive appearances for PSG include Jean-Pierre Dogliani, Mustapha Dahleb, Safet Sušić, Luis Fernandez, Jean-Marc Pilorget, David Ginola, George Weah, Raí, Jay-Jay Okocha, Pauleta, and Zlatan Ibrahimović.

Jean Djorkaeff, Carlos Bianchi, Ronaldinho, and Lionel Messi are also notable among players who did not reach 100 appearances for the club. Djorkaeff was PSG's first major star and helped them secure the Ligue 2 title in 1971. Bianchi signed for PSG in 1977 and was crowned Ligue 1 top scorer on two occasions, although the Argentine striker did not win a trophy during his time in France. Ronaldinho also failed to win silverware with PSG, but the Brazilian playmaker captivated supporters with his dribbling ability, standout performances, and memorable goals. Finally, Messi became the first player in the history of PSG to win the Ballon d'Or while representing the club, claiming the award in 2021.

Despite only a handful of appearances, another noteworthy player is David Beckham, who signed for PSG in January 2013. At 37, the move represented the final chapter of a highly successful career, while the club benefited from his global commercial appeal. Beckham retired from professional football following an emotional victory over Brest at the Parc des Princes in May 2013, a result that sealed PSG's first Ligue 1 title in 19 years. He received a standing ovation from supporters after the final whistle.

== Players ==
As of 2025–26 season.

=== 300+ appearances ===
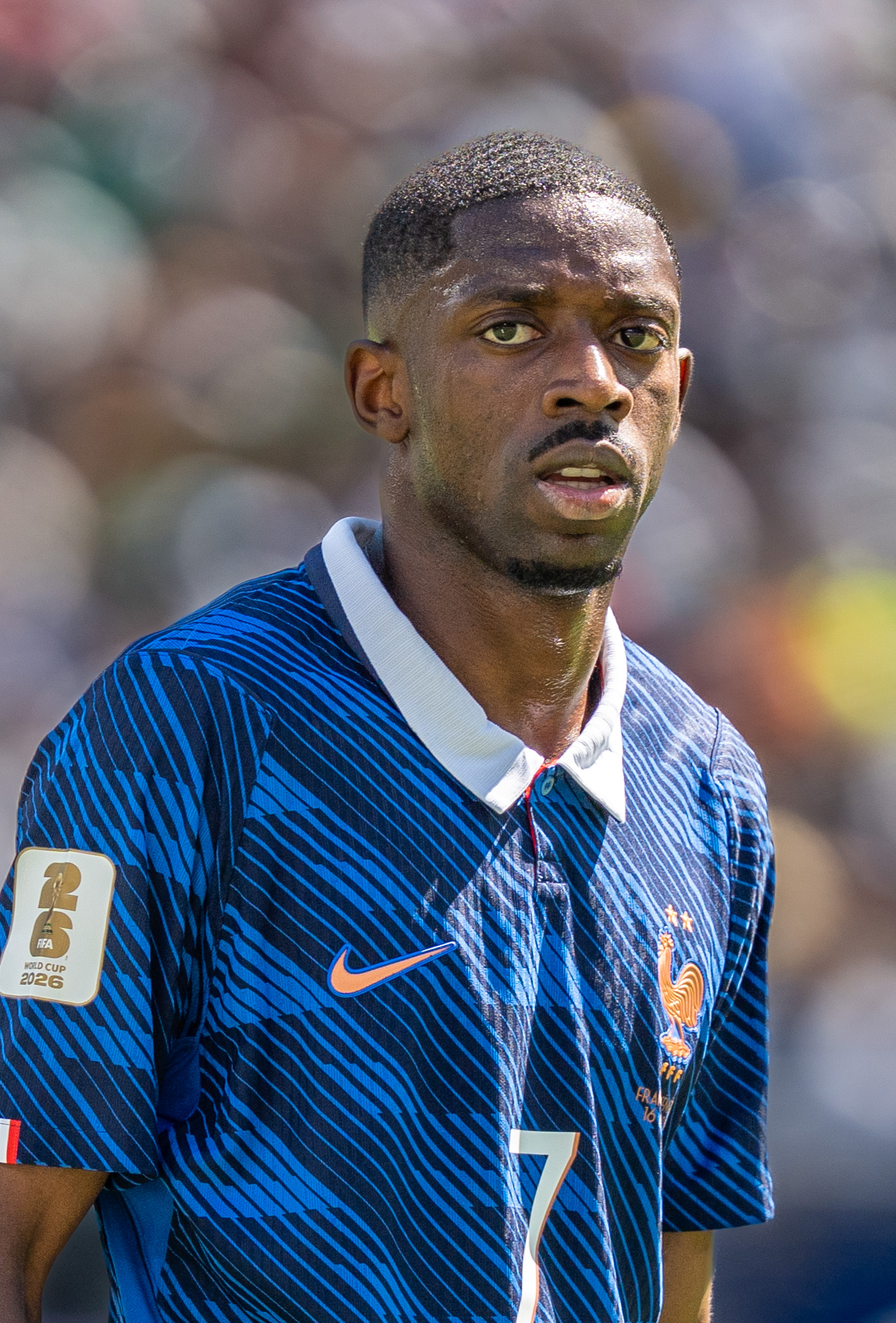
Ousmane Dembélé

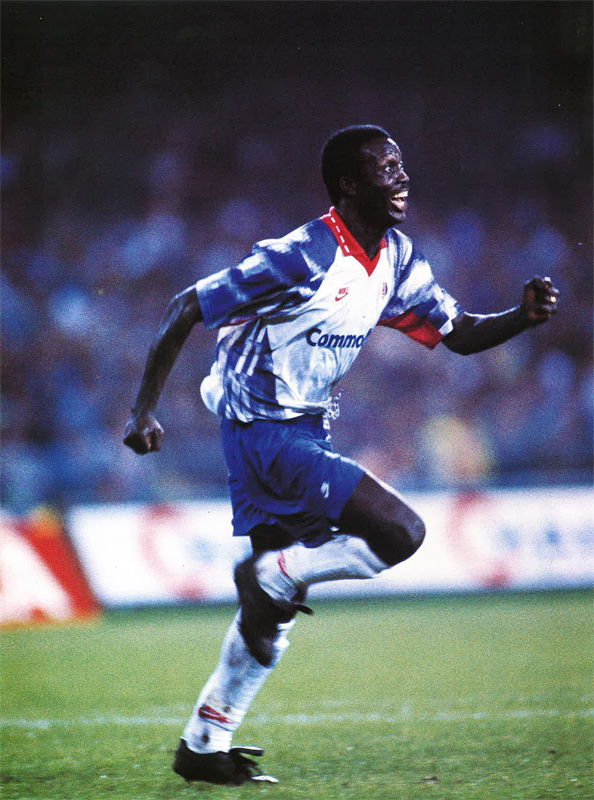
George Weah

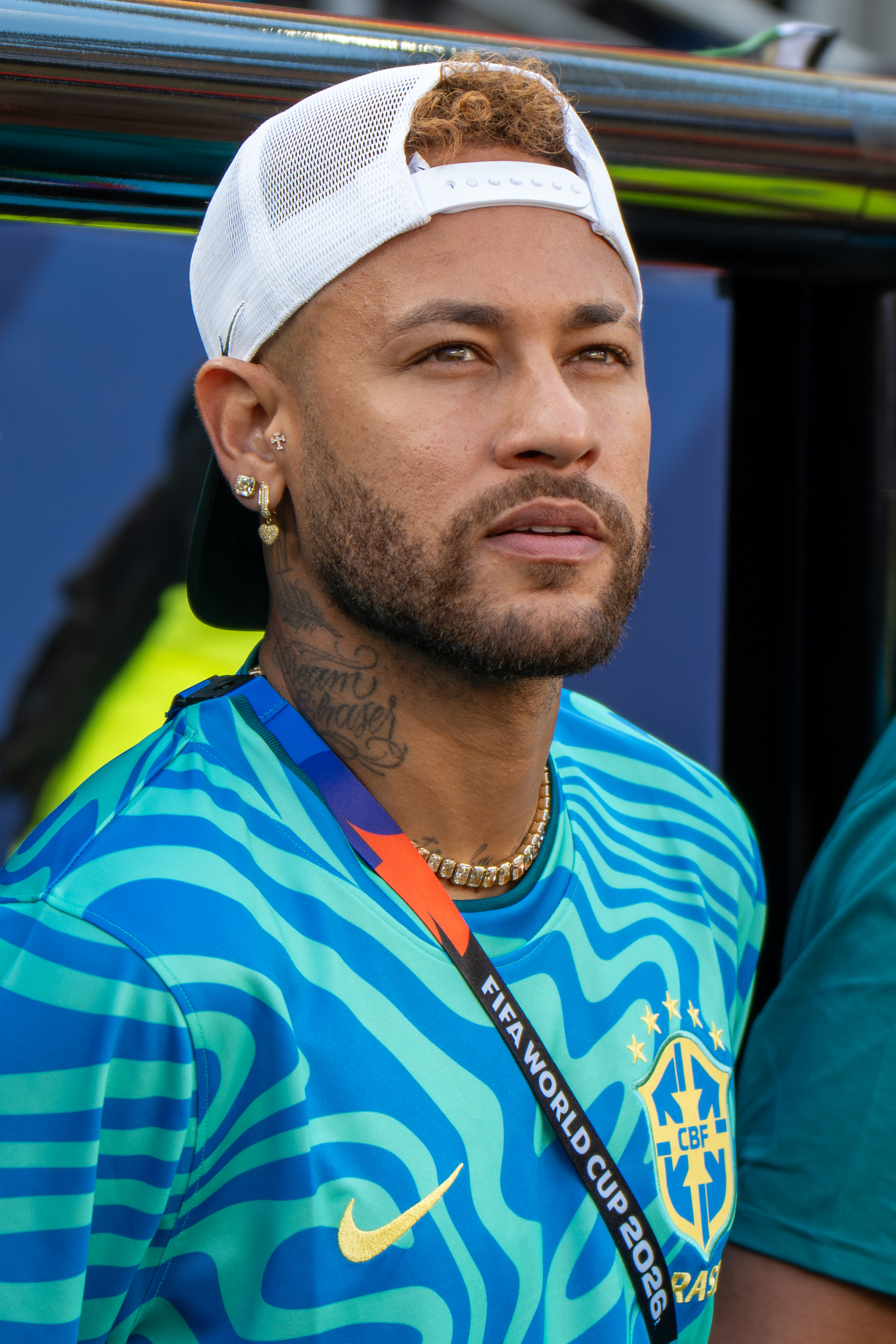
Neymar

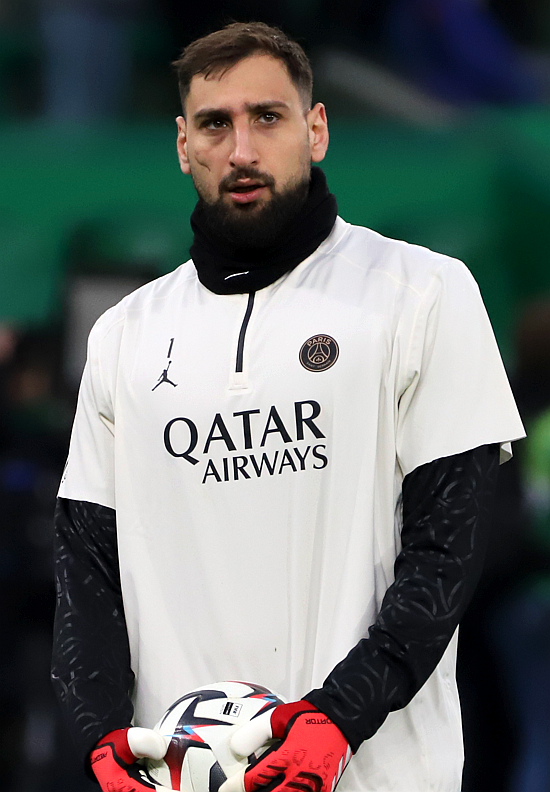
Gianluigi Donnarumma

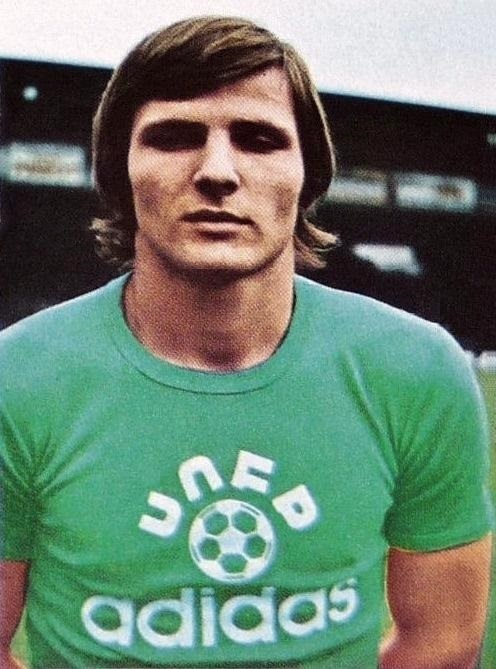
Dominique Bathenay

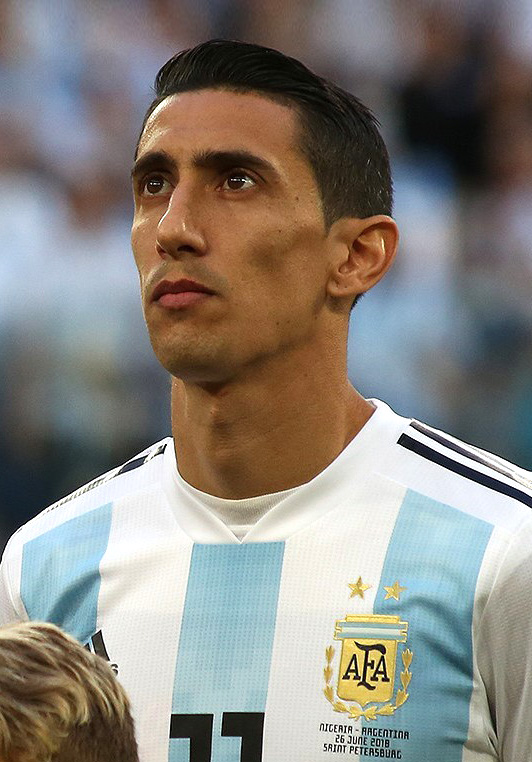
Ángel Di María

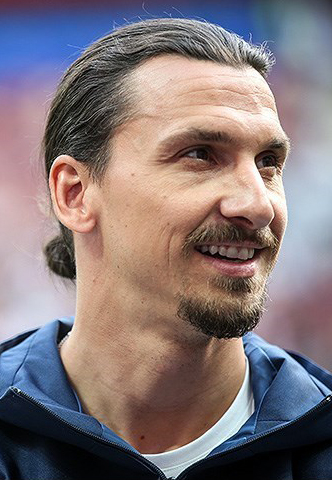
Zlatan Ibrahimović

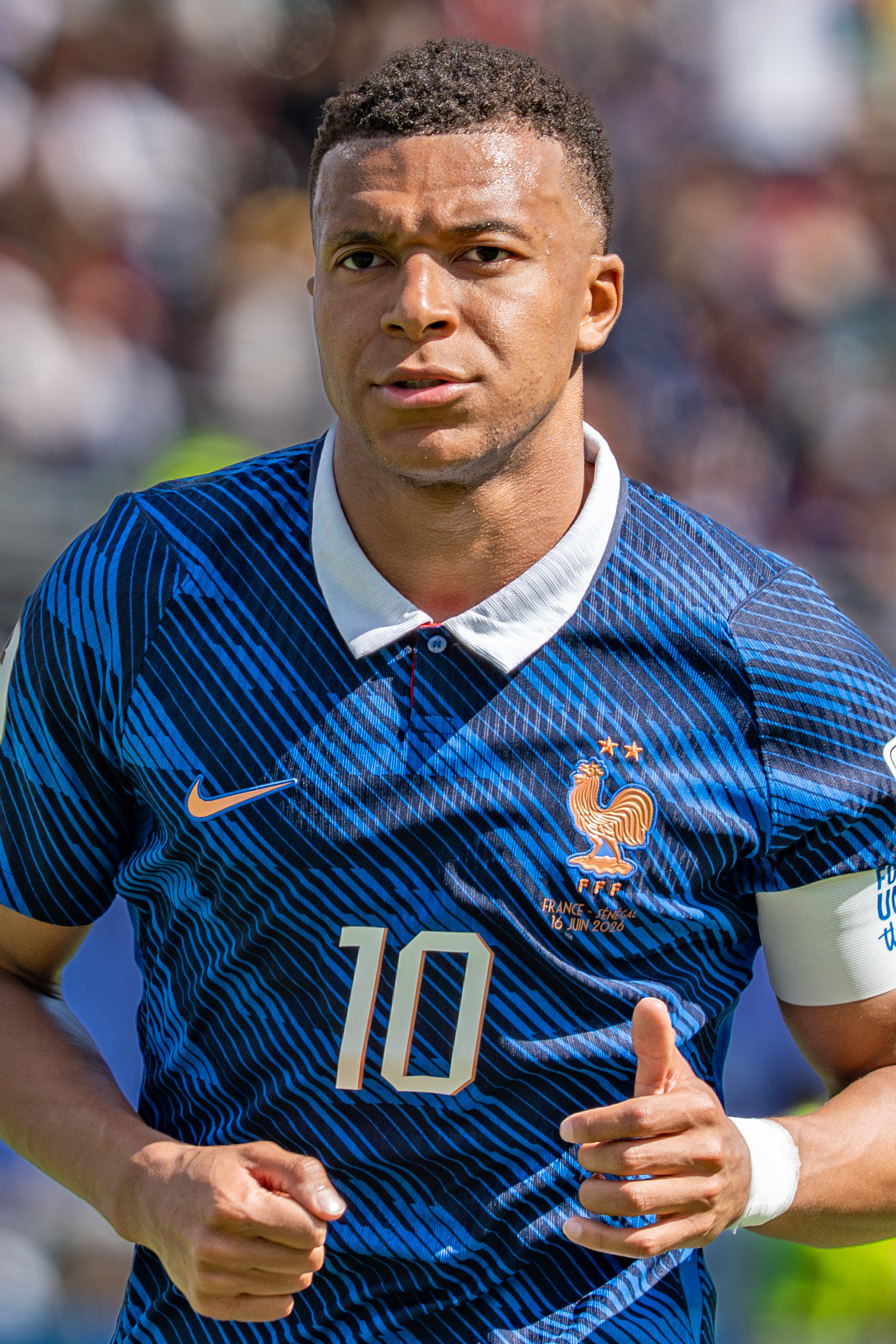
Kylian Mbappé

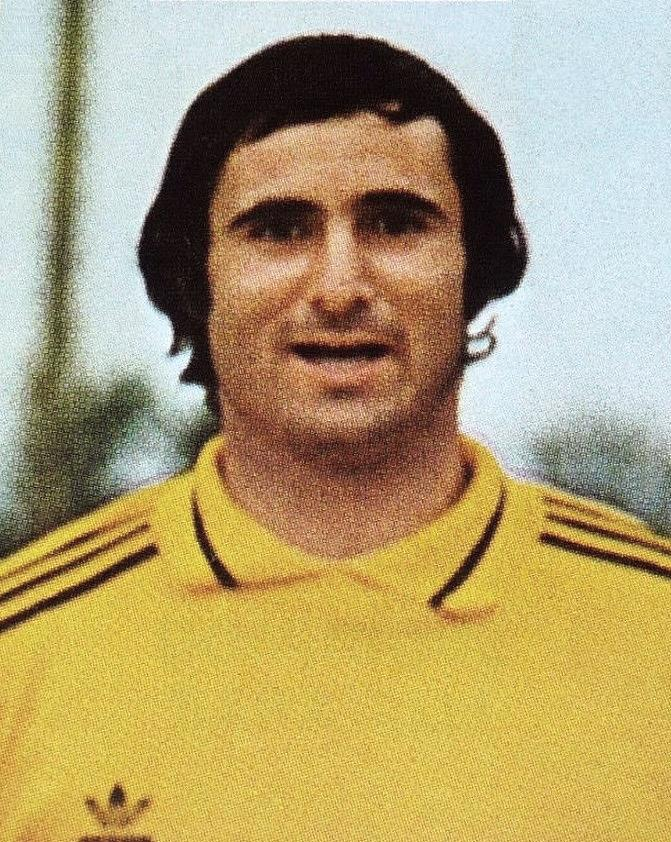
Dominique Baratelli

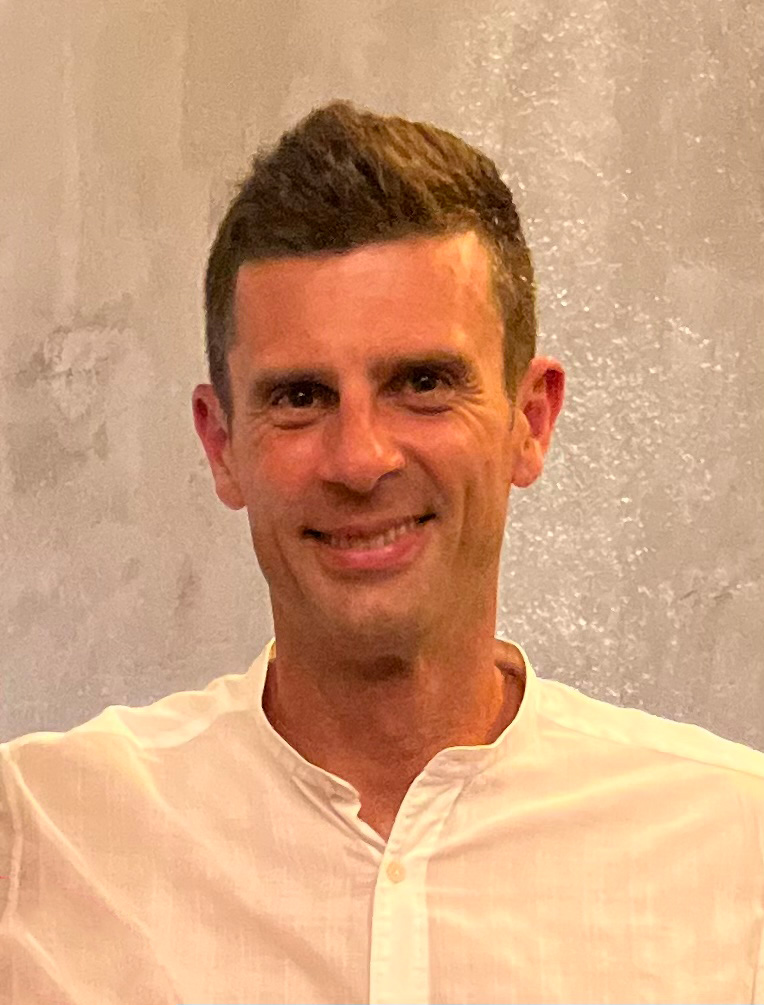
Thiago Motta

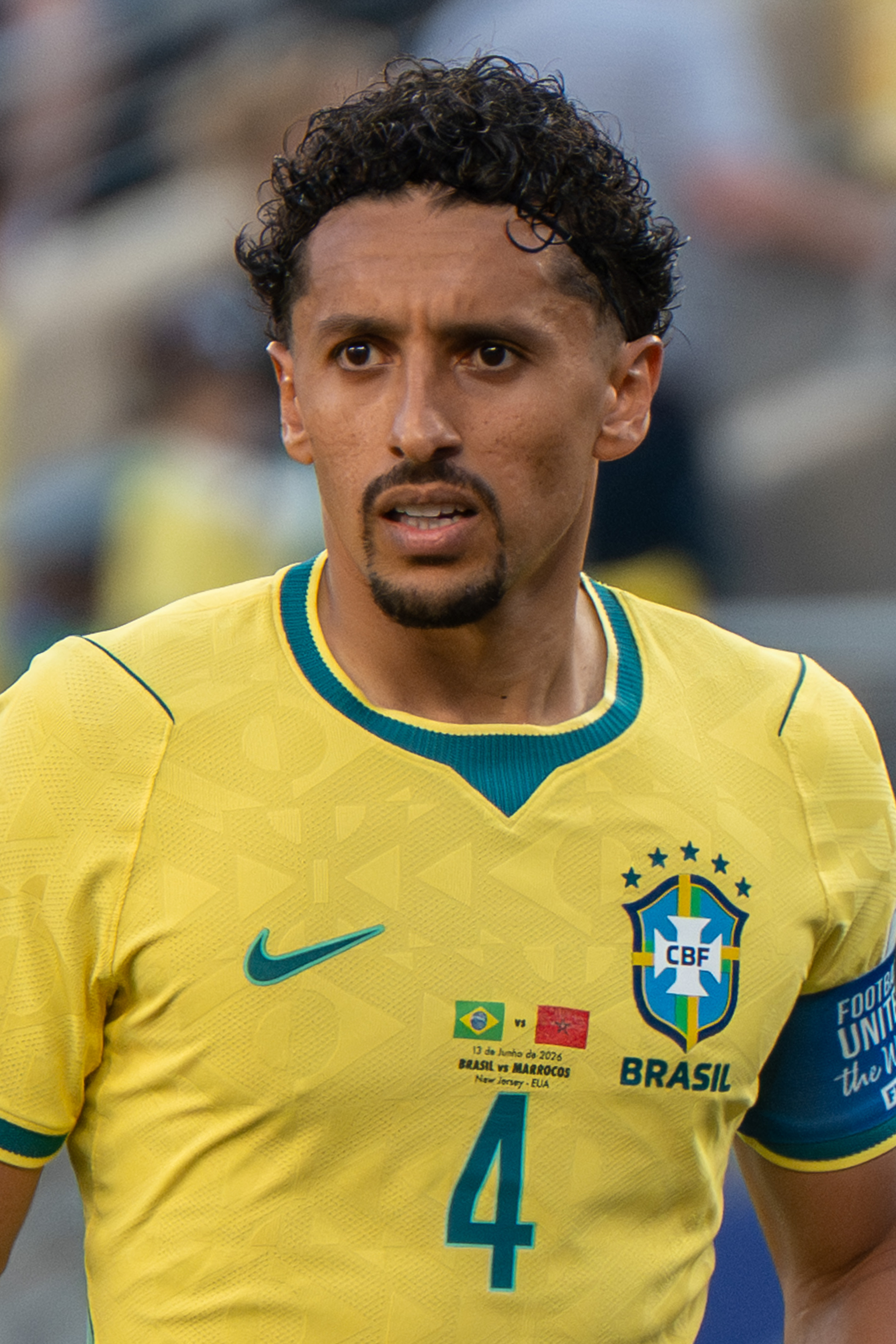
Marquinhos

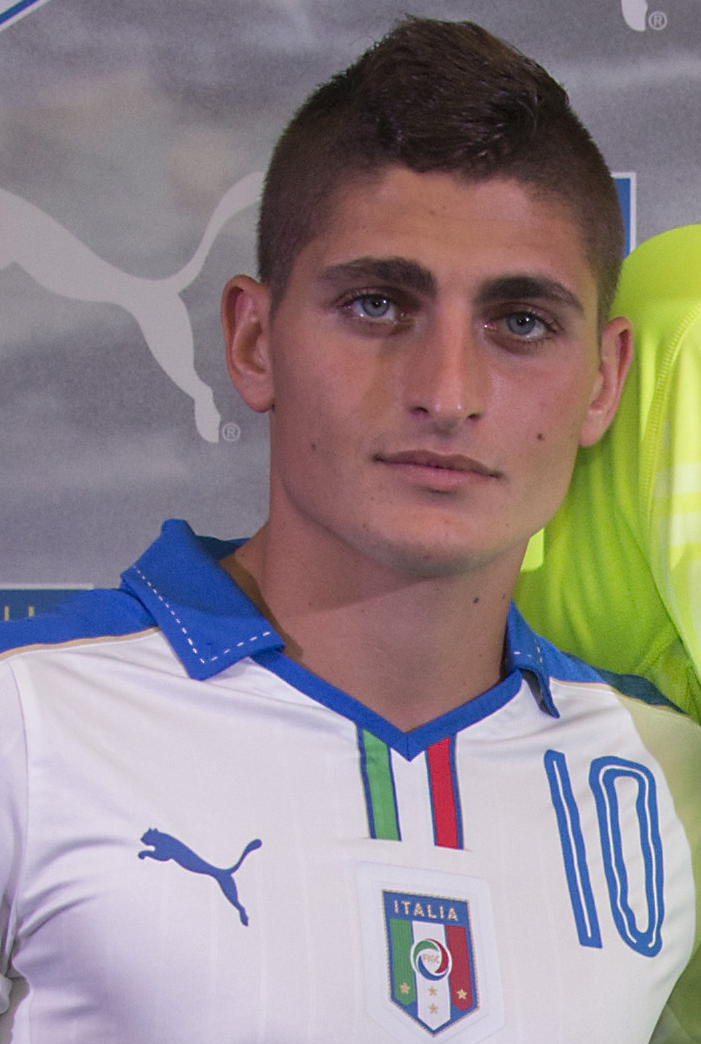
Marco Verratti

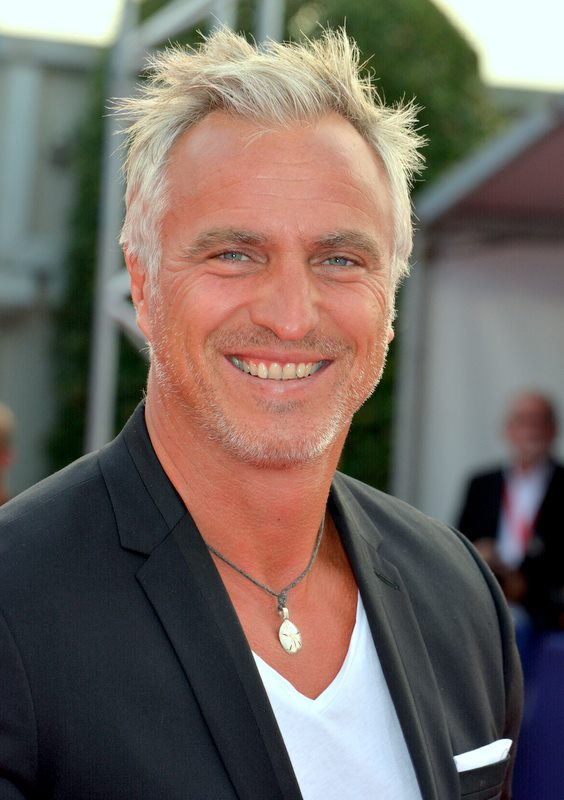
David Ginola

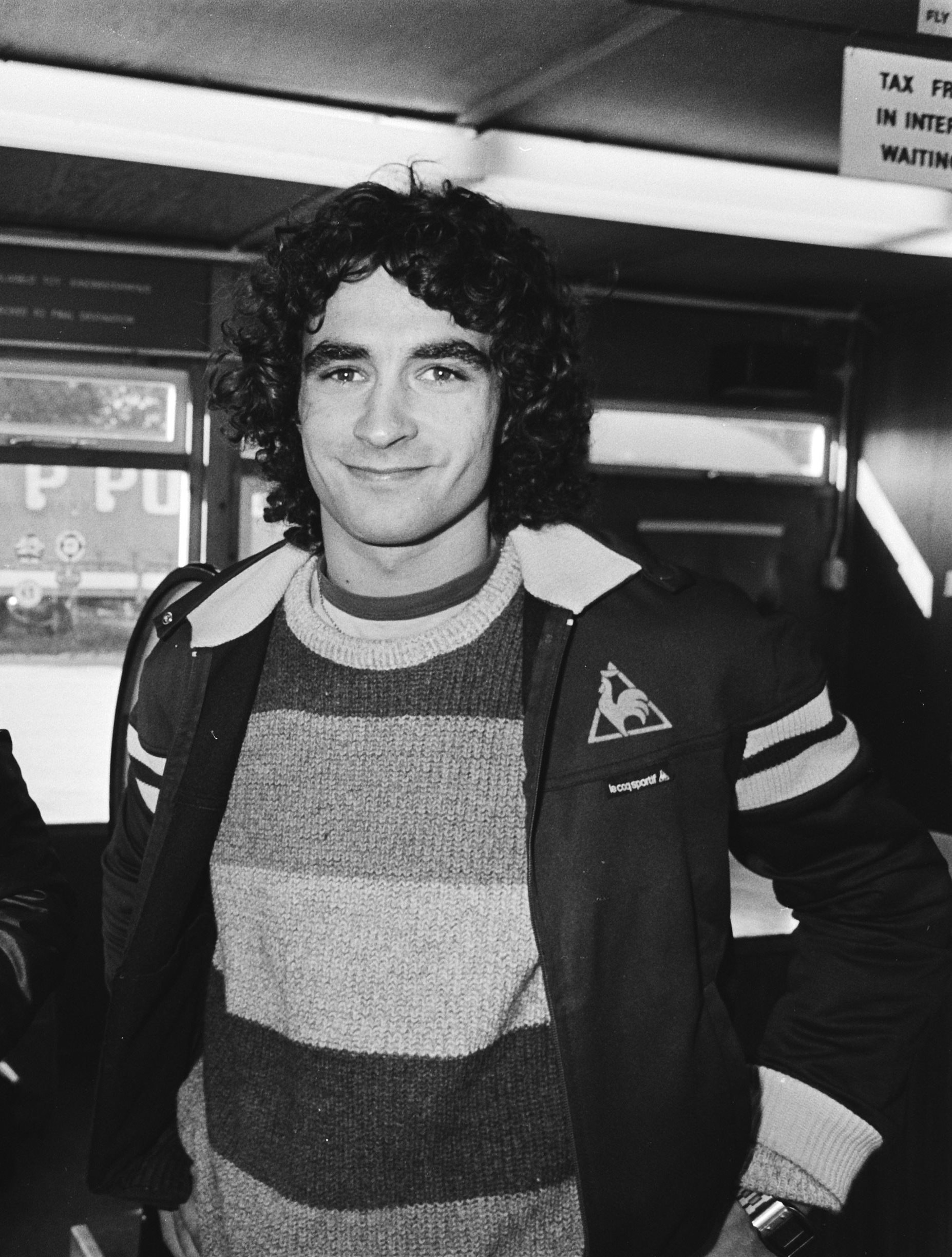
Dominique Rocheteau

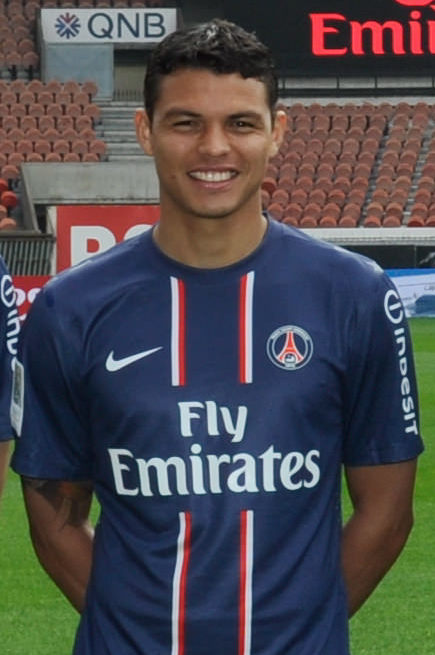
Thiago Silva

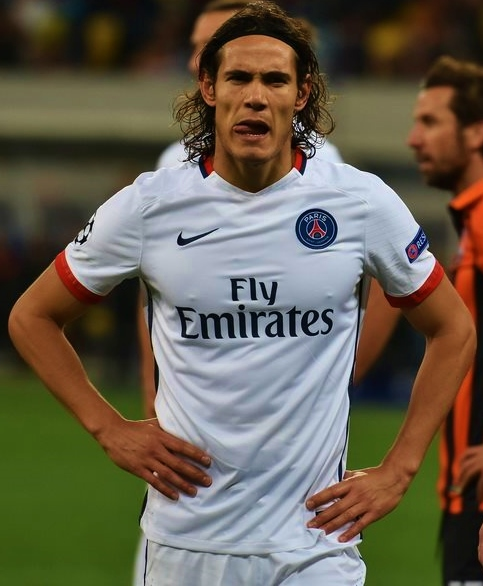
Edinson Cavani

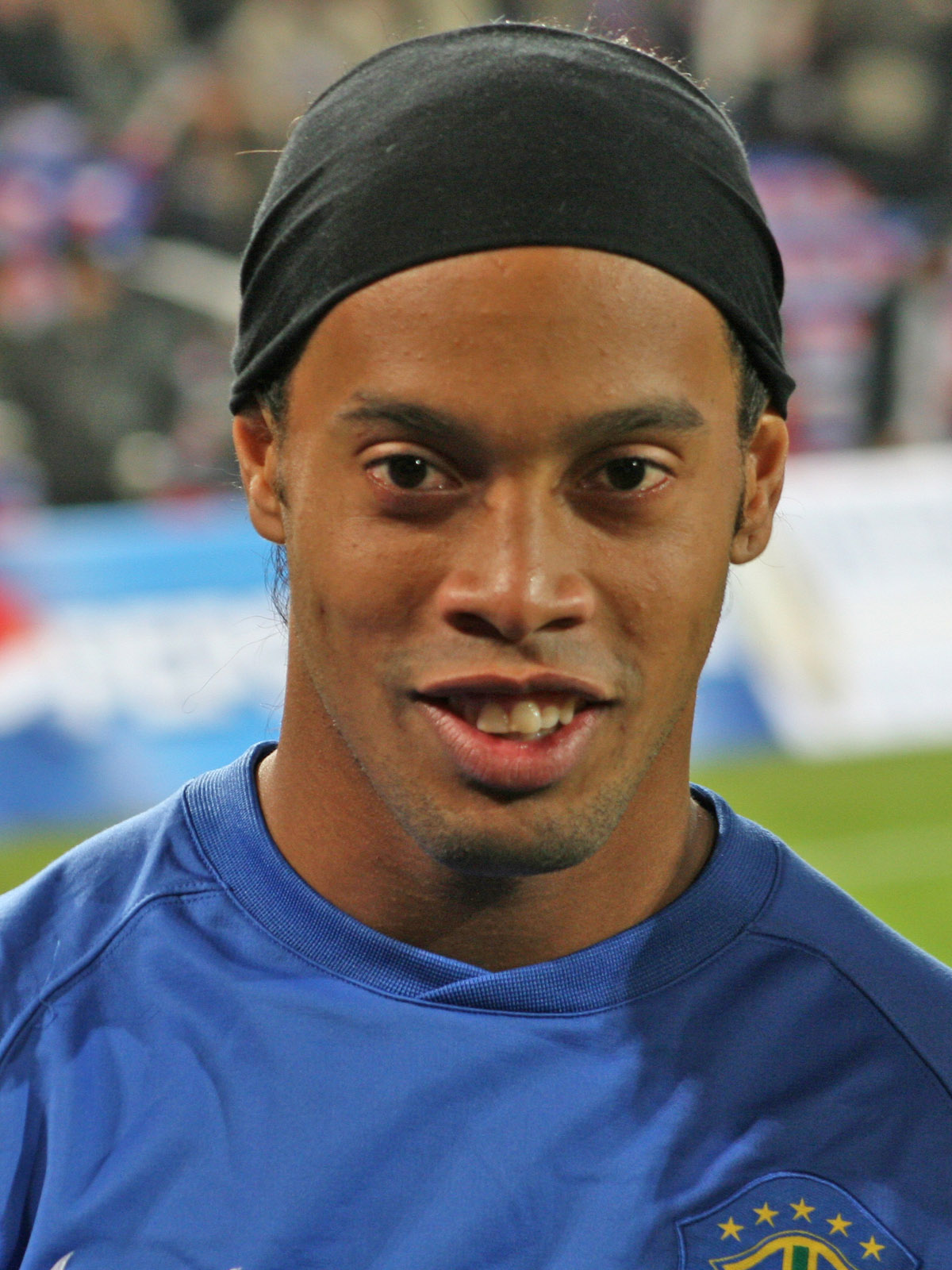
Ronaldinho

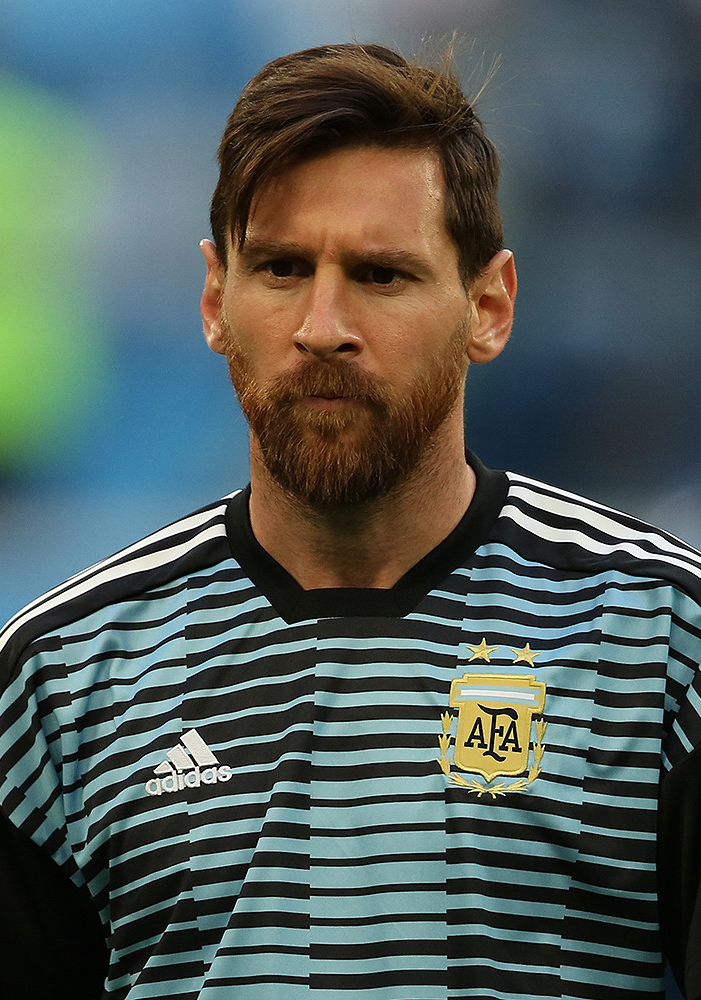
Lionel Messi

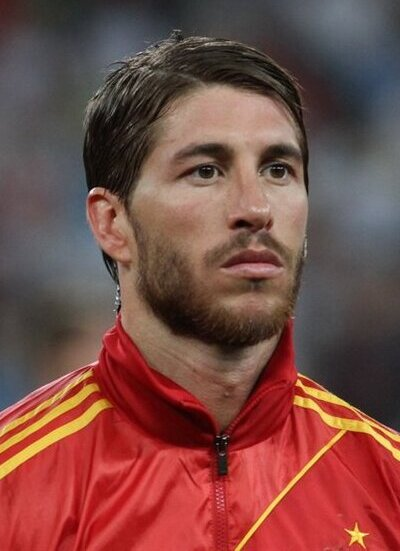
Sergio Ramos

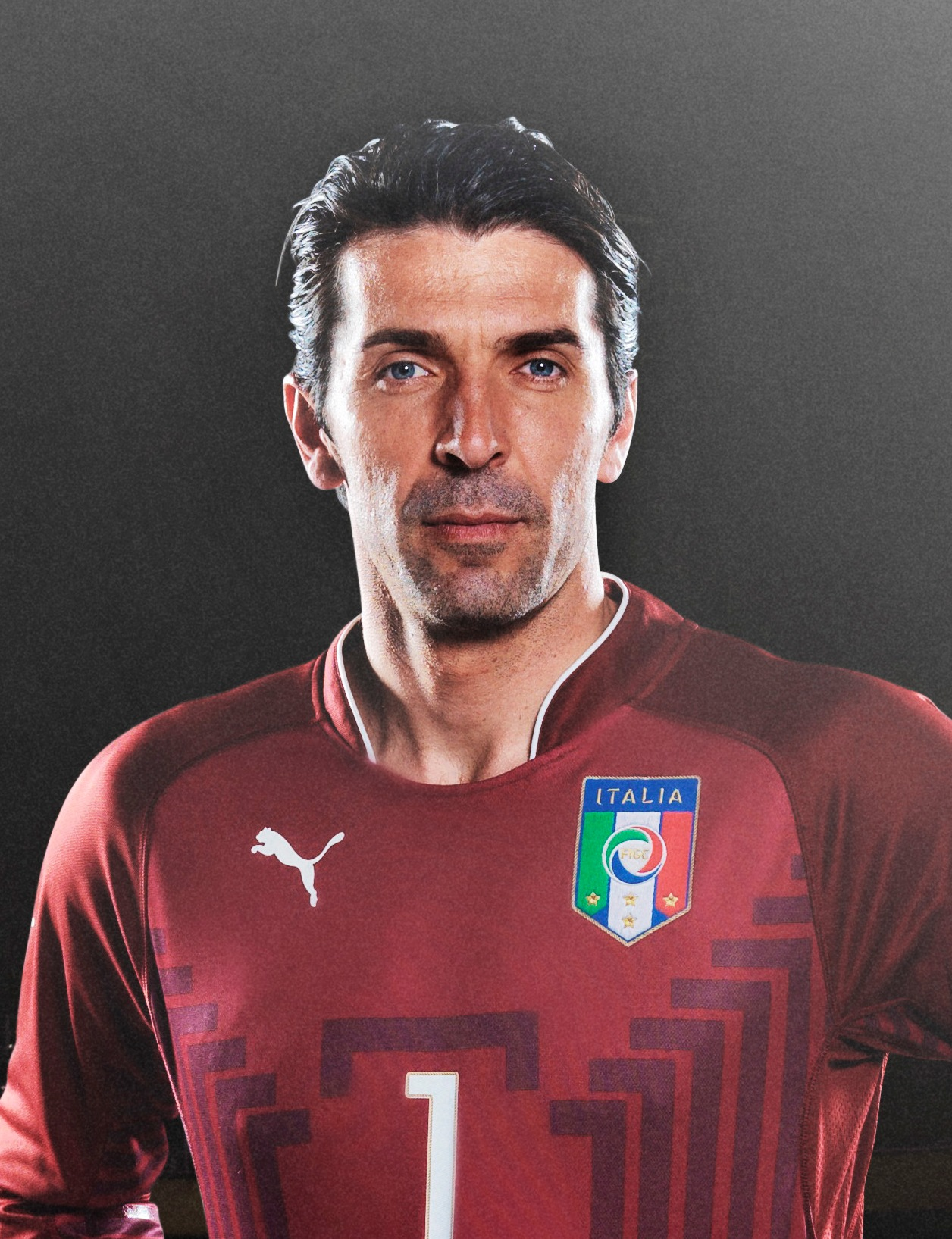
Gianluigi Buffon

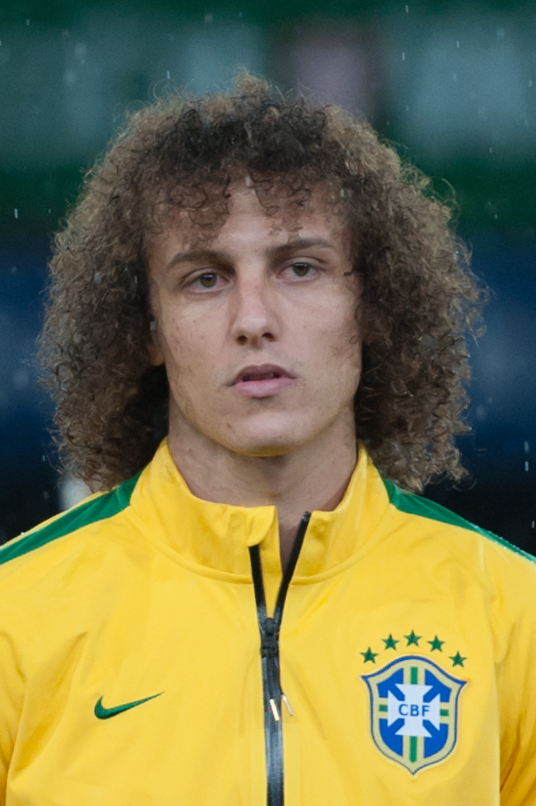
David Luiz

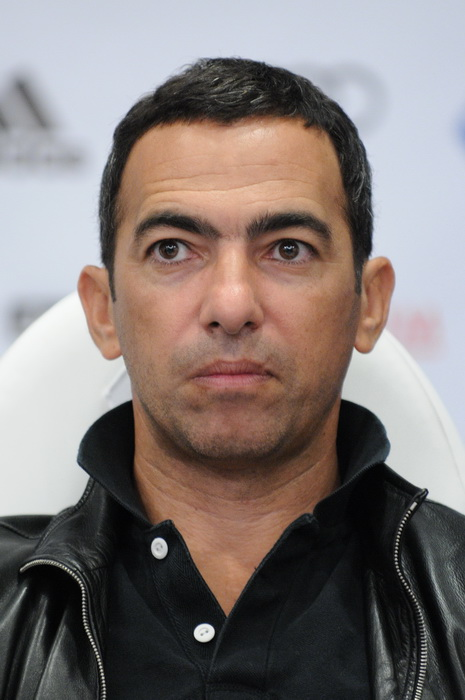
Youri Djorkaeff

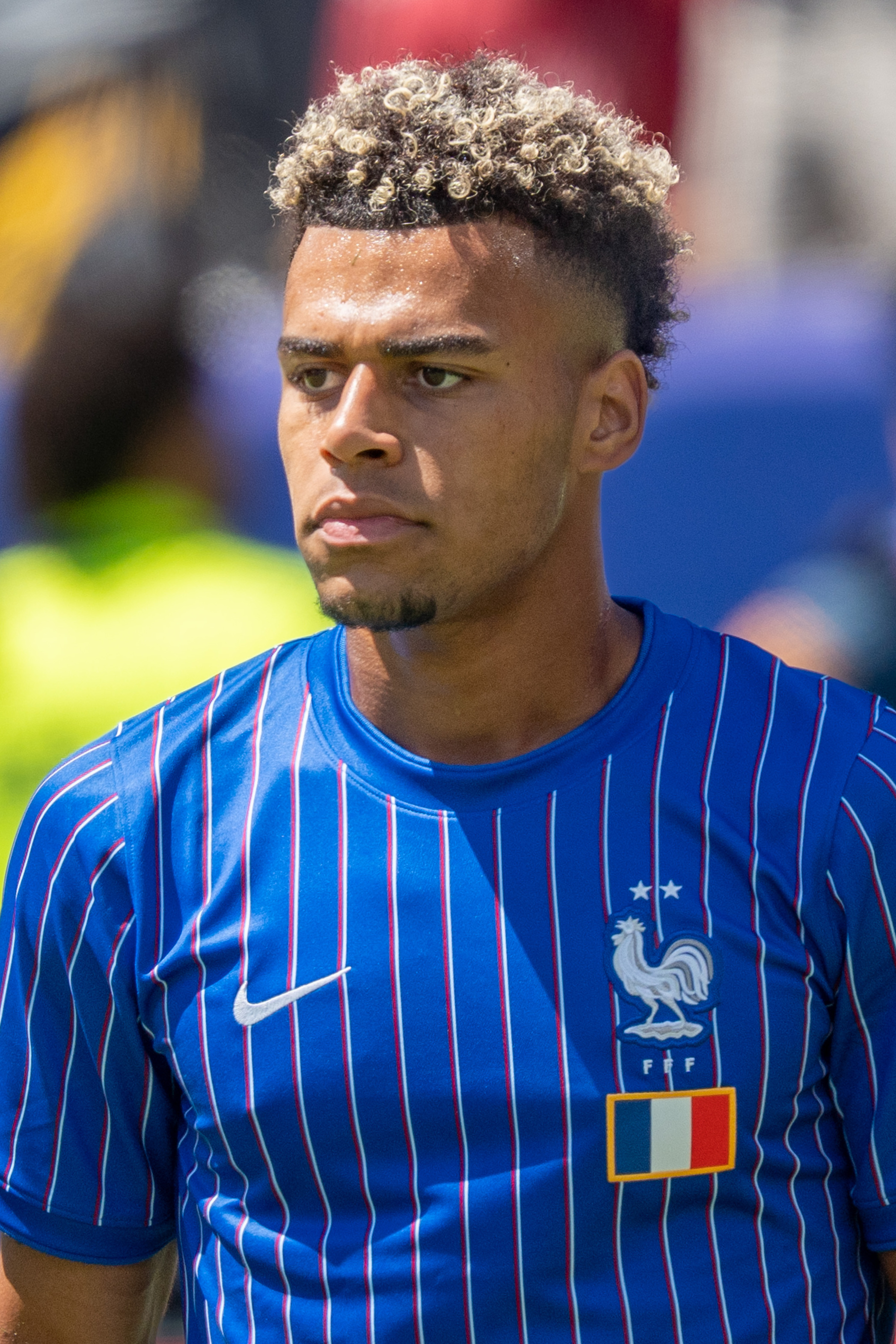
Désiré Doué

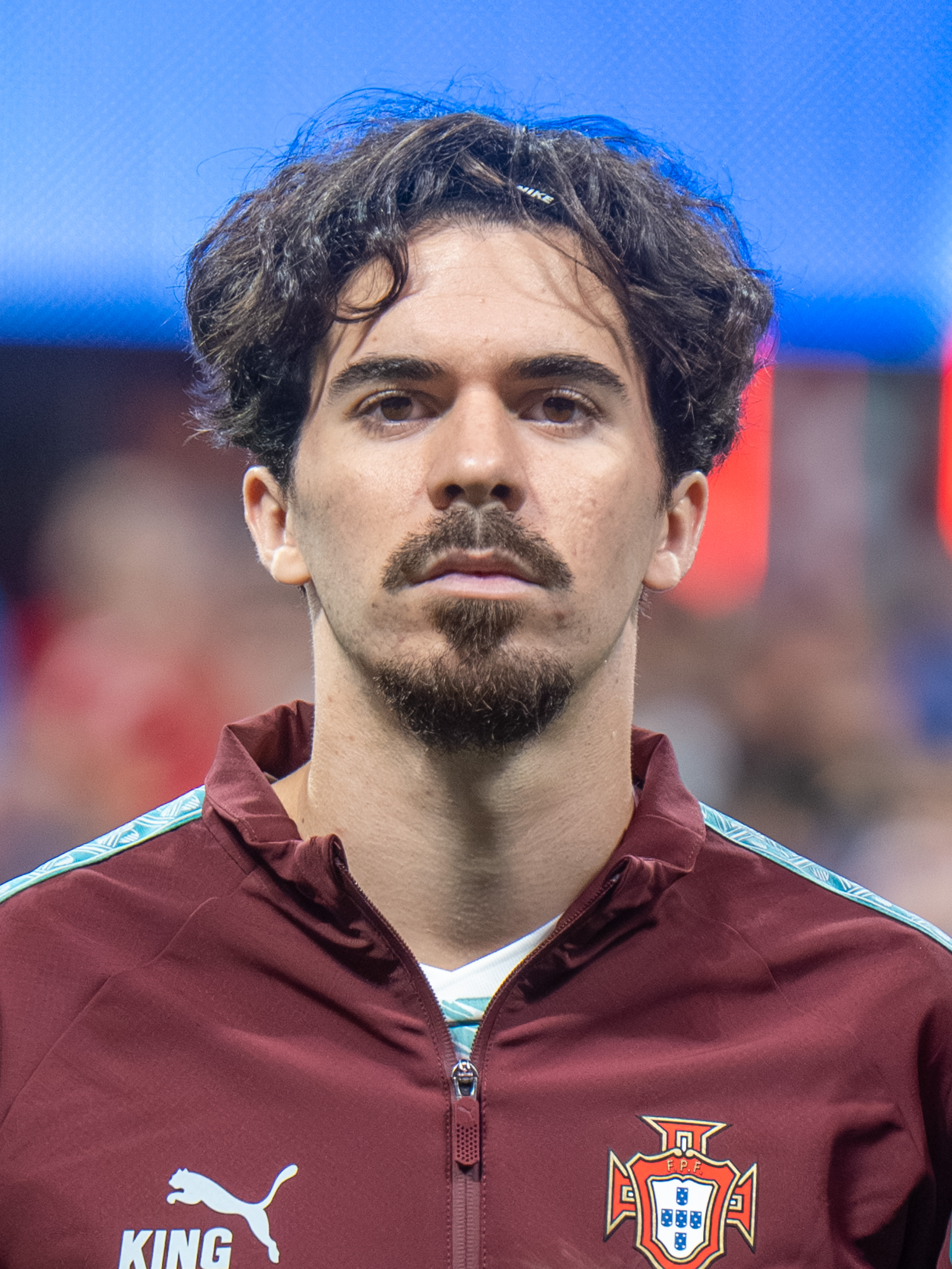
Vitinha

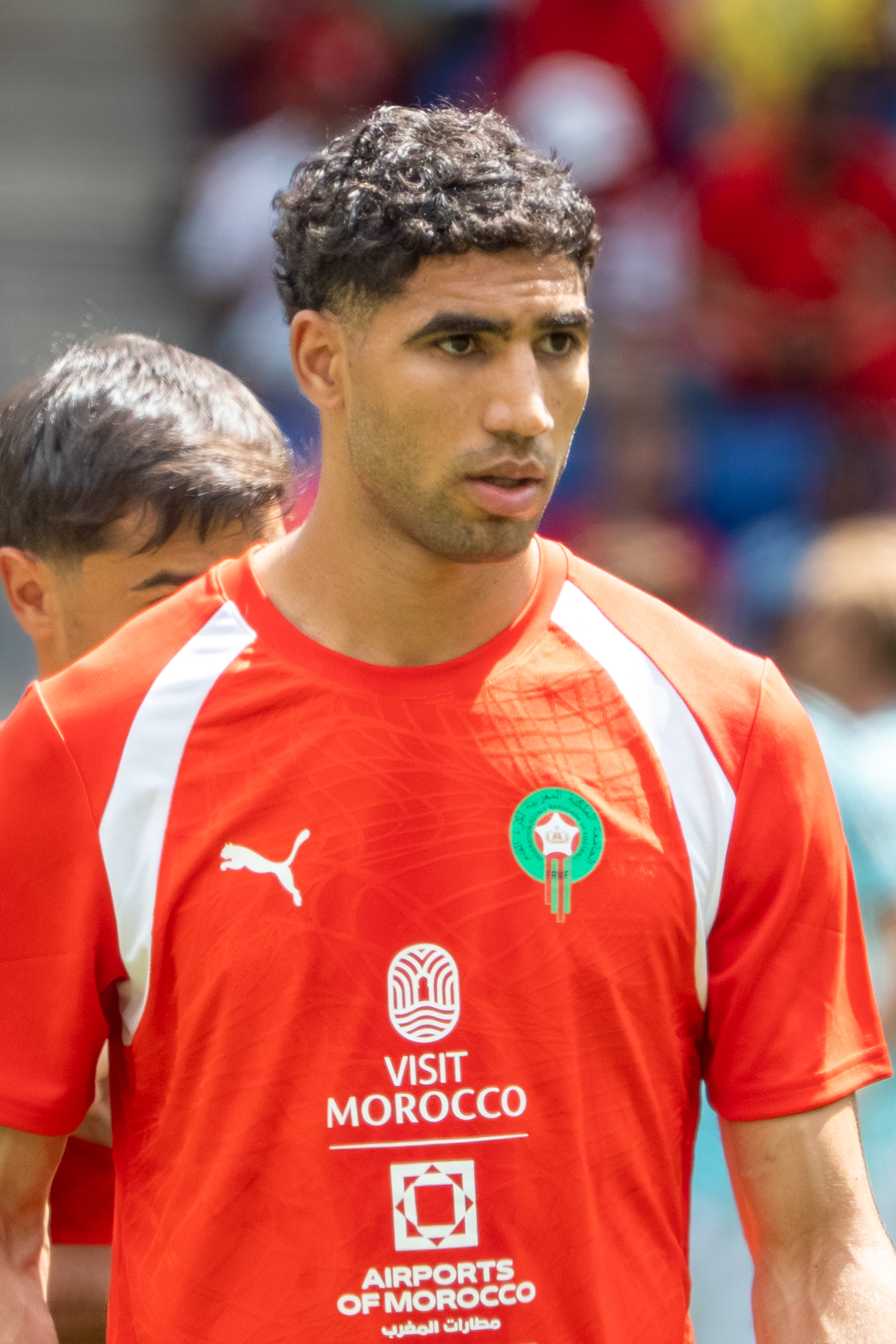
Achraf Hakimi

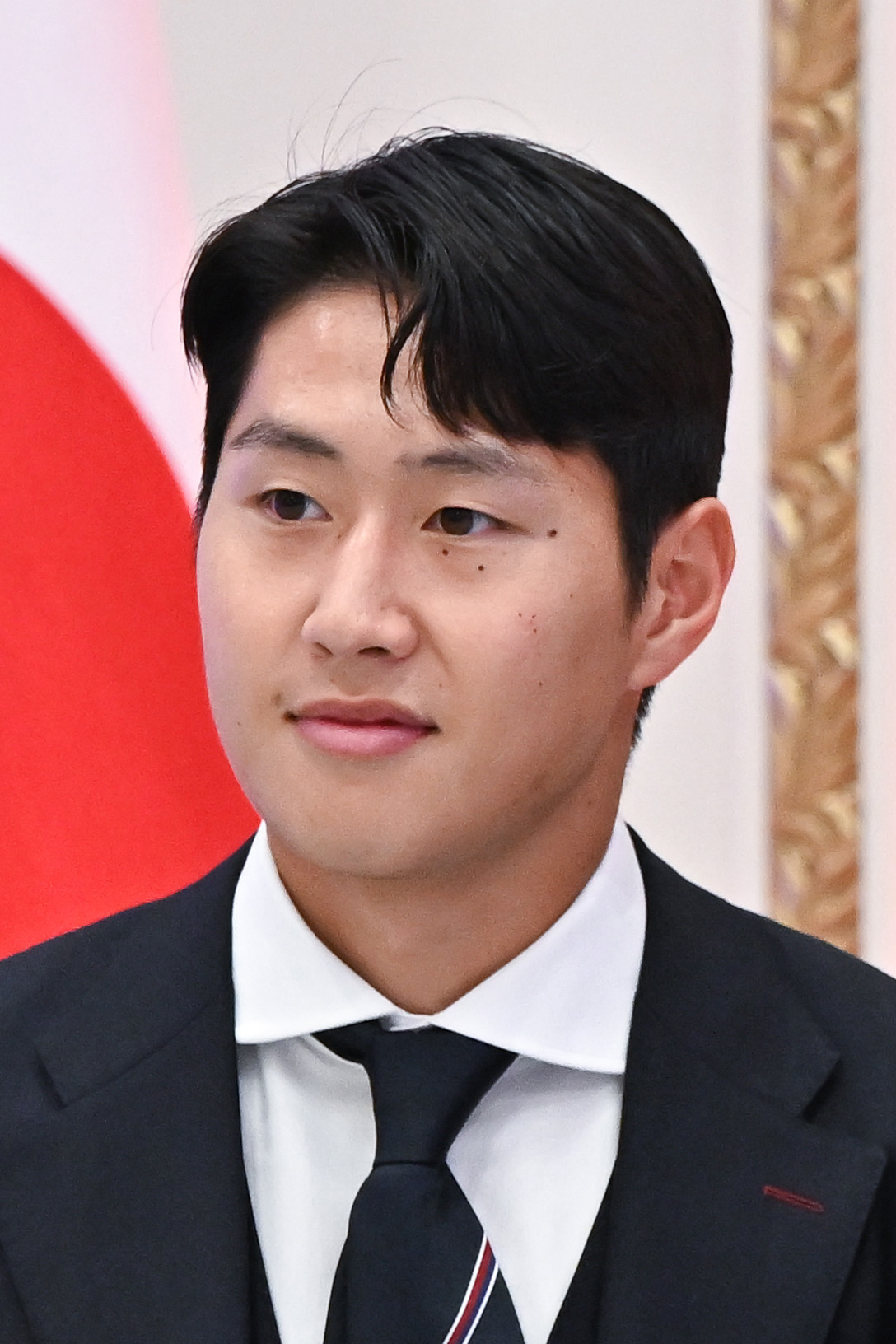
Lee Kang-in

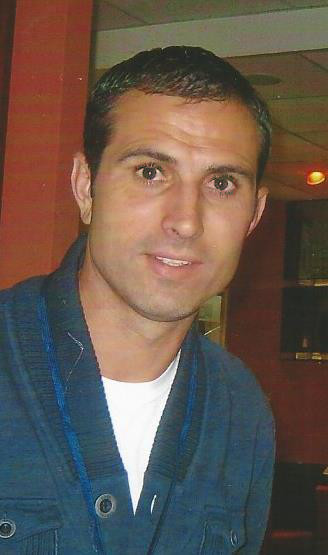
Pauleta

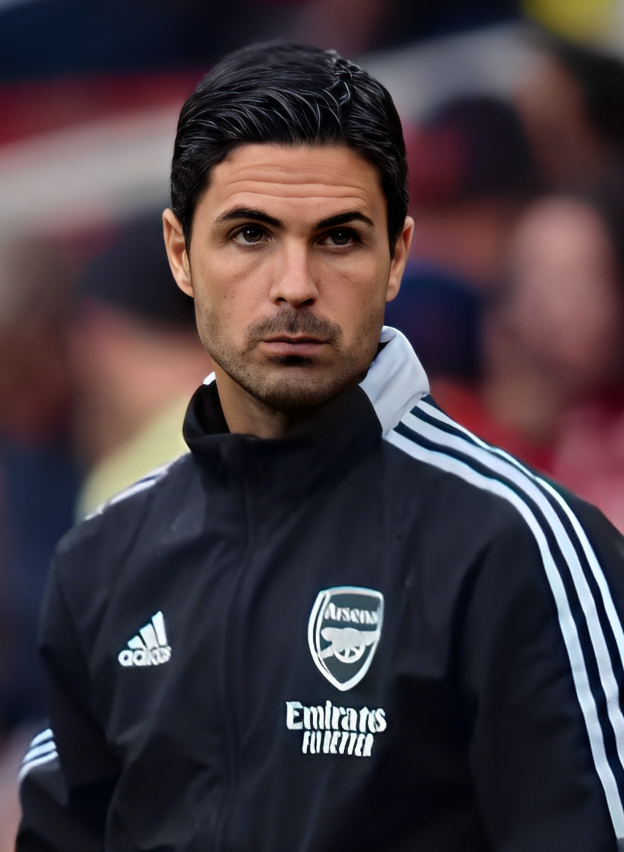
Mikel Arteta

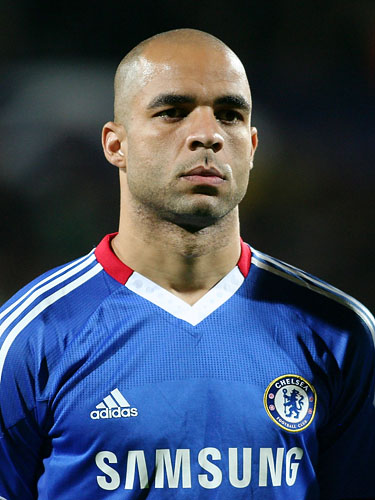
Alex

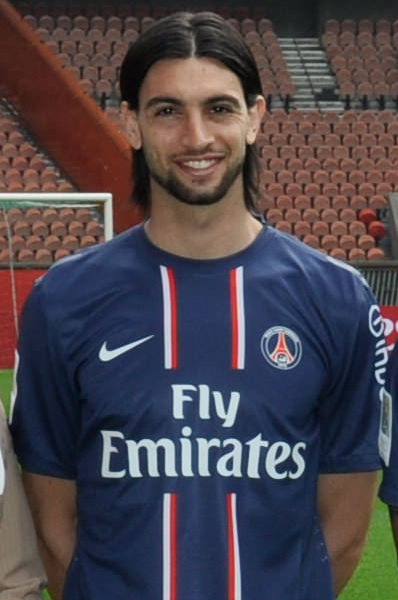
Javier Pastore

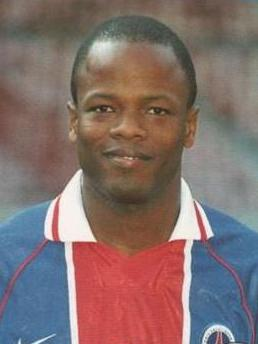
Julio Dely Valdés

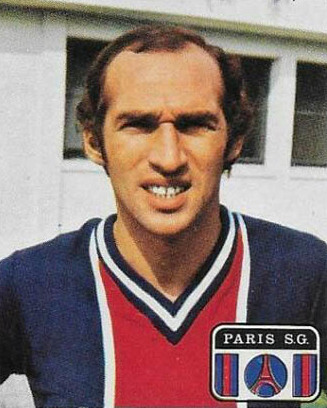
Carlos Bianchi

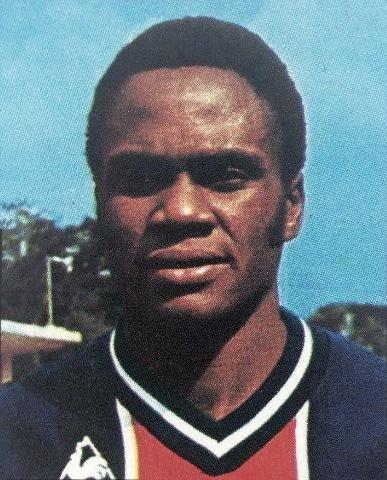
François M'Pelé

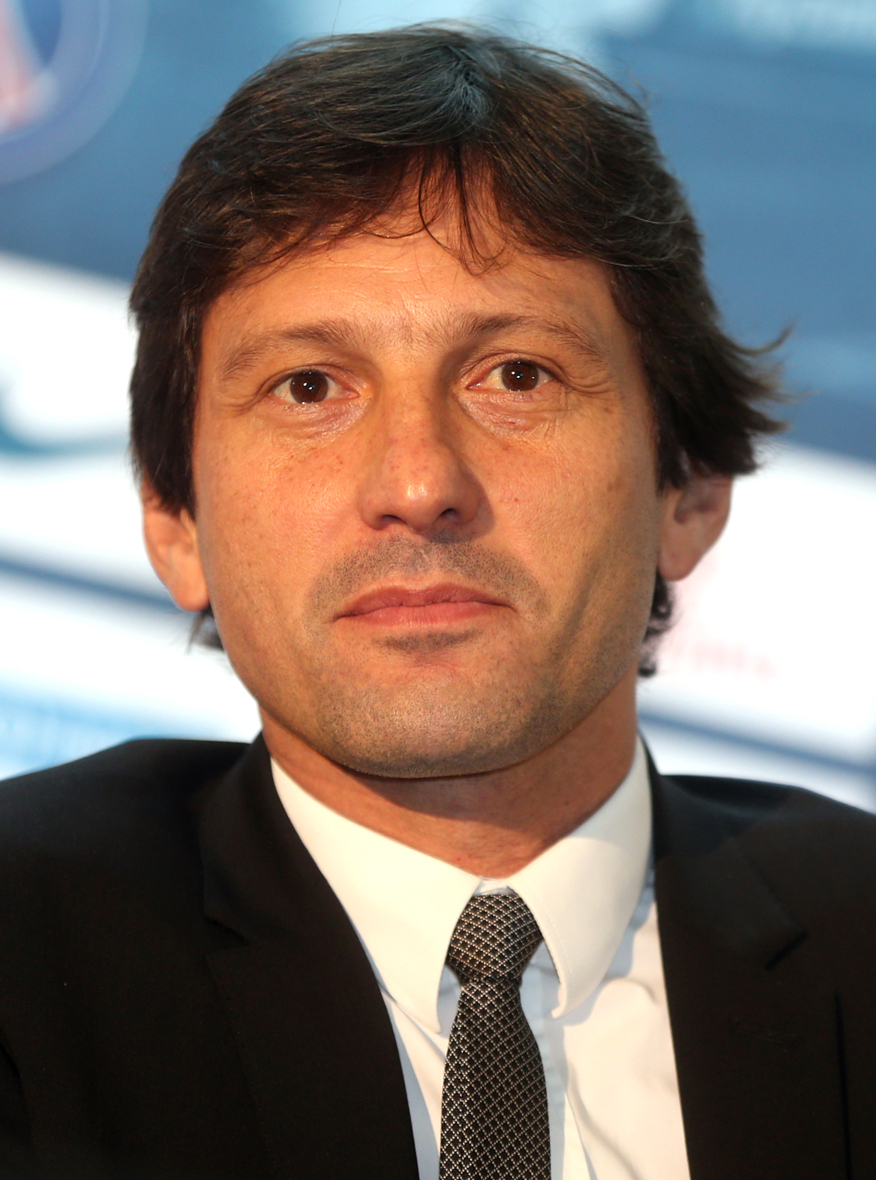
Leonardo

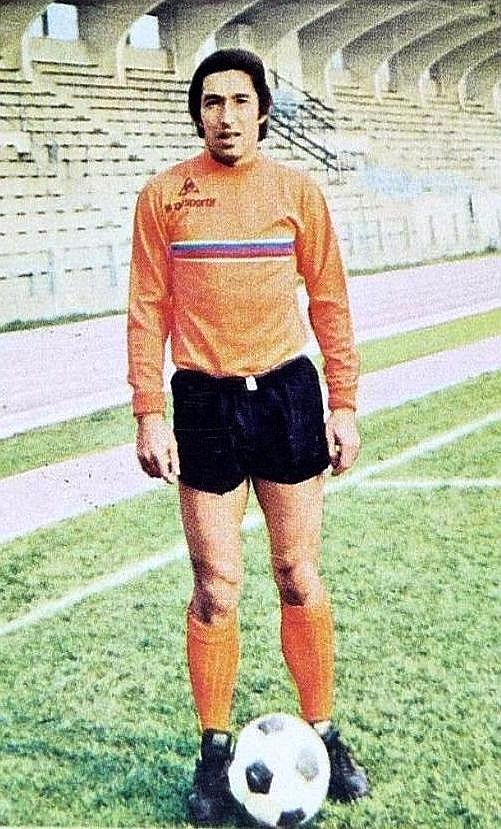
Jean Djorkaeff

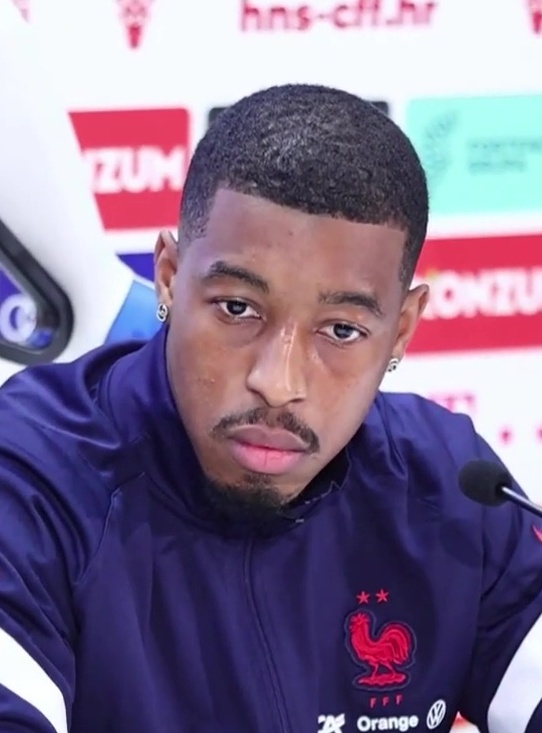
Presnel Kimpembe

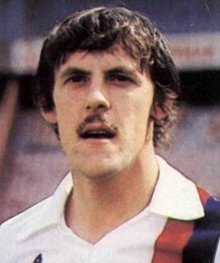
Pascal Zaremba

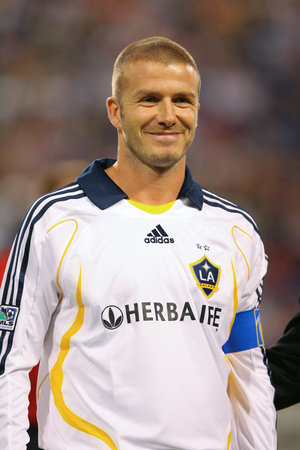
David Beckham

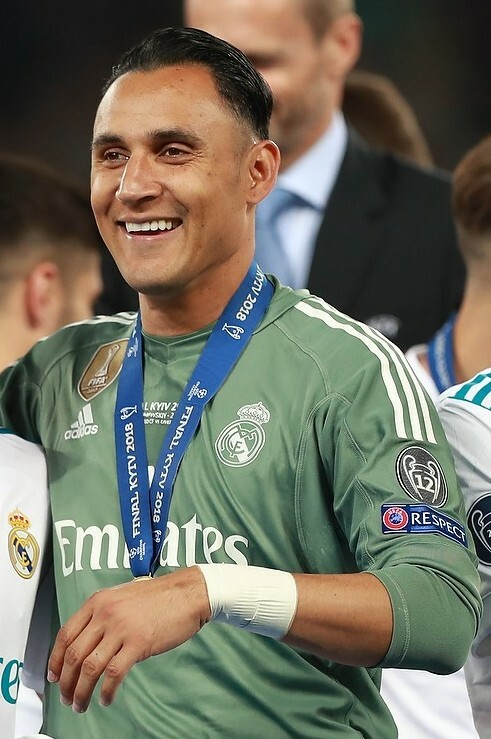
Keylor Navas

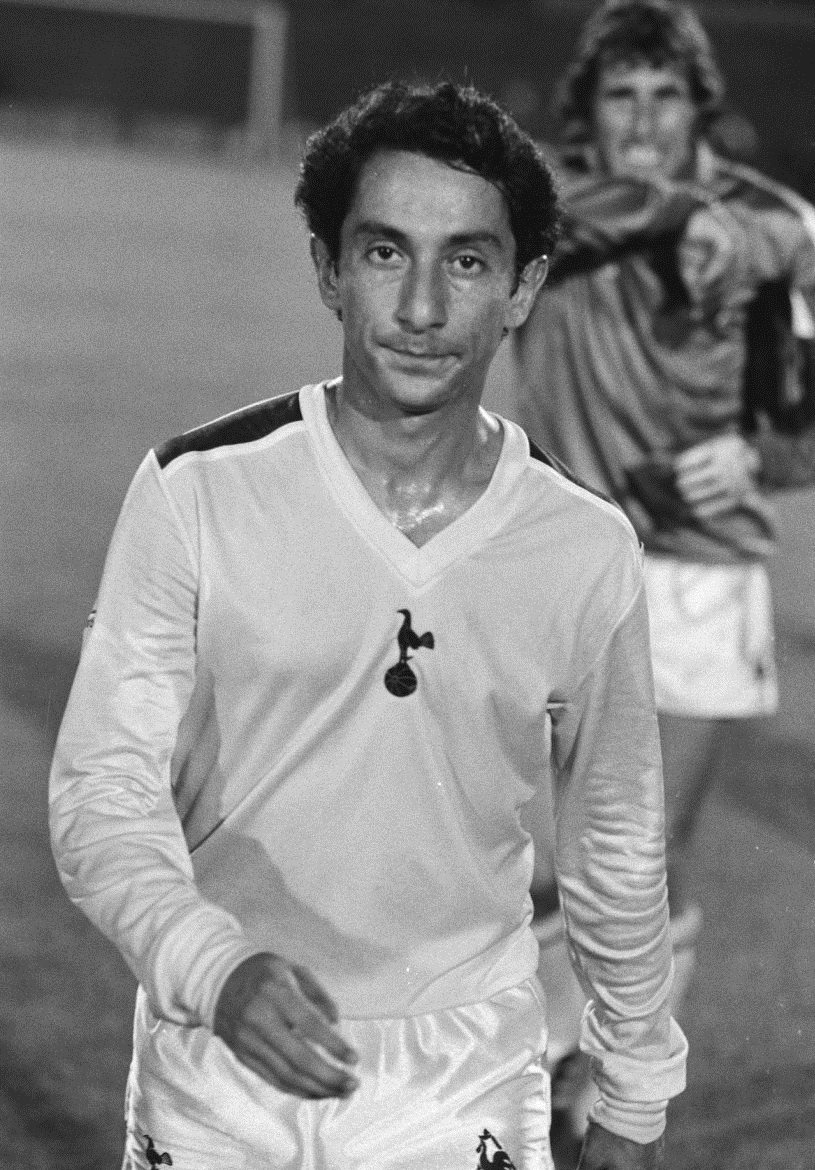
Osvaldo Ardiles

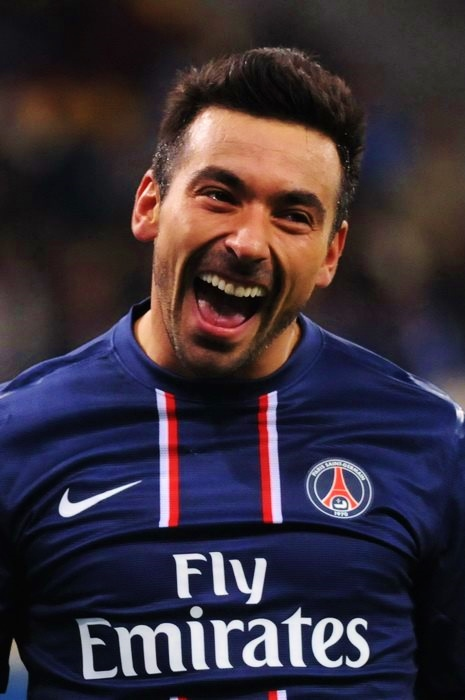
Ezequiel Lavezzi

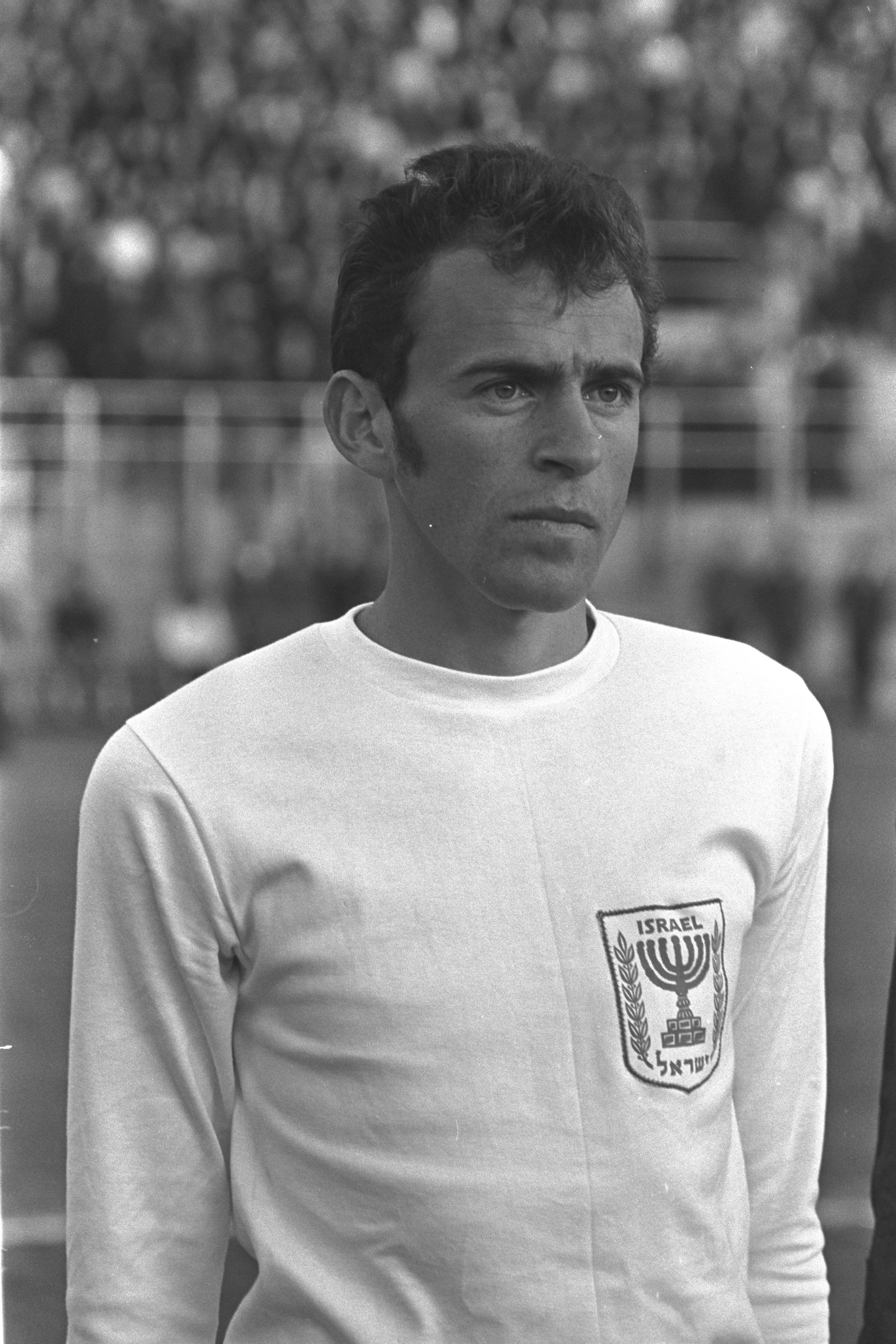
Mordechai Spiegler

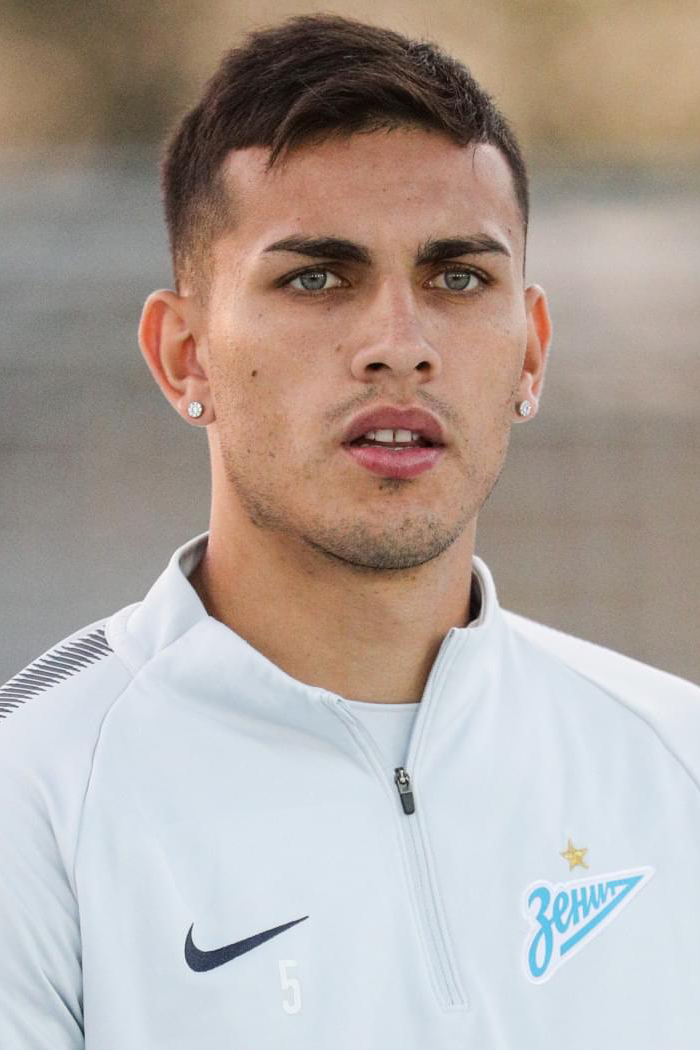
Leandro Paredes

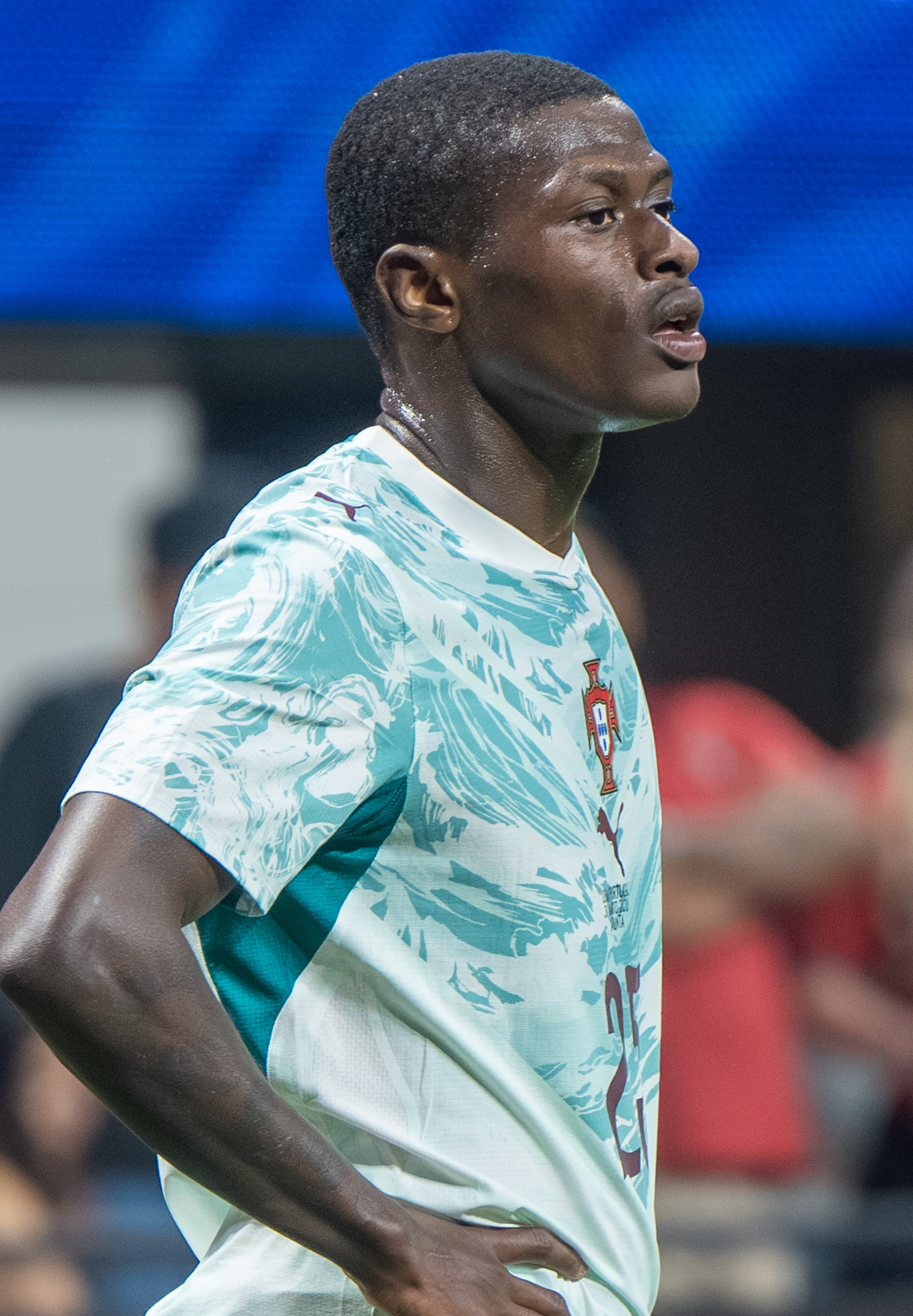
Nuno Mendes

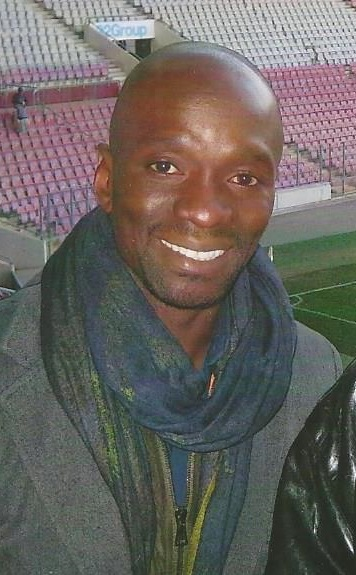
Claude Makélélé

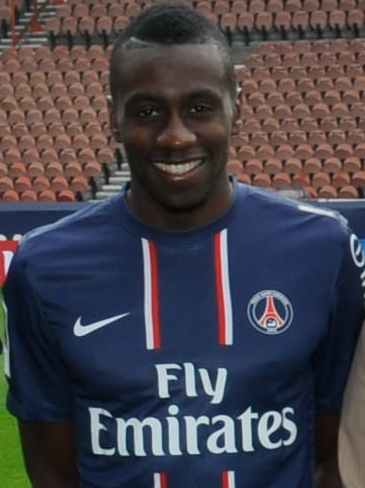
Blaise Matuidi

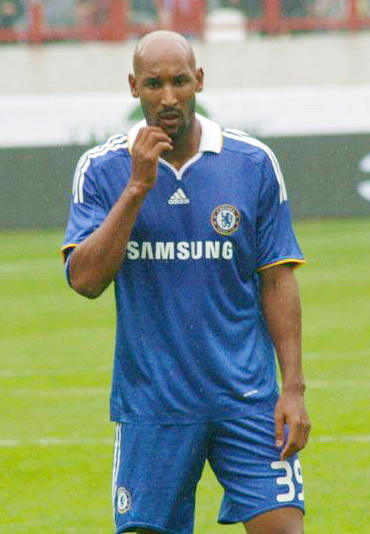
Nicolas Anelka

Player	Position	Paris Saint-Germain	Appearances	Goals	Assists	Source
(Brazil) Marquinhos	DF	2013–	523	43	12	
(France) Jean-Marc Pilorget	DF	1975–1989	435	17	20	
(Italy) Marco Verratti	MF	2012–2023	416	11	56	
(France) Sylvain Armand	DF	2004–2013	380	12	16	
(Socialist Federal Republic of Yugoslavia) Safet Sušić	MF	1982–1991	344	85	103	
(France) Paul Le Guen	DF	1991–1998	344	24	39	
(France) Bernard Lama	GK	1992–2000	318	0	0	
(Brazil) Thiago Silva	DF	2012–2020	315	17	8	
(Algeria) Mustapha Dahleb	MF	1974–1984	310	98	80	
(France) Kylian Mbappé	FW	2017–2024	308	256	96	
(Uruguay) Edinson Cavani	FW	2013–2020	301	200	35	

=== 200–299 appearances ===
Player	Position	Paris Saint-Germain	Appearances	Goals	Assists	Source
(Argentina) Ángel Di María	MF	2015–2022	295	92	112	
(France) Blaise Matuidi	MF	2011–2017	295	33	28	
(France) Éric Renaut	DF	1972–1982	290	35	1	
(France) Joël Bats	GK	1985–1992	285	0	0	
(France) Dominique Baratelli	GK	1978–1985	281	0	0	
(France) Daniel Bravo	MF	1989–1996	280	26	24	
(France) Dominique Bathenay	DF	1978–1985	273	35	16	
(France) Luis Fernandez	MF	1978–1986	273	39	12	
(Argentina) Javier Pastore	MF	2011–2018	269	45	56	
(France) Jean-Claude Lemoult	MF	1977–1986	266	11	9	
(France) Édouard Cissé	MF	1997–2007	259	9	11	
(France) Dominique Rocheteau	FW	1980–1987	254	100	42	
(France) Franck Tanasi	DF	1977–1991	254	0	7	
(France) Vincent Guérin	MF	1992–1998	253	25	18	
(France) Laurent Fournier	DF	1991–1998	253	18	16	
(France) Clément Chantôme	MF	2006–2015	249	10	10	
(France) Francis Llacer	DF	1989–2003	248	4	6	
(France) Bernard Mendy	DF	2000–2008	247	11	13	
(France) Presnel Kimpembe	DF	2014–2025	241	3	1	
(Italy) Thiago Motta	MF	2012–2018	231	12	16	
(Brazil) Lucas Moura	MF	2013–2018	229	46	45	
(France) Adrien Rabiot	MF	2012–2019	227	24	14	
(France) Zoumana Camara	DF	2007–2015	224	7	1	
(France) Alain Roche	DF	1992–1998	223	12	3	
(France) Philippe Jeannol	DF	1984–1991	219	15	1	
(Republic of the Congo) François M'Pelé	FW	1973–1979	217	95	23	
(Brazil) Raí	MF	1993–1998	215	72	30	
(Brazil) Maxwell	DF	2012–2017	214	13	24	
(France) Patrick Colleter	DF	1991–1996	213	1	8	
(Portugal) Pauleta	FW	2003–2008	211	109	18	
(Morocco) Achraf Hakimi	DF	2021–	207	28	40	
(Portugal) Vitinha	MF	2022–	203	26	23	
(France) Mamadou Sakho	DF	2007–2013	201	7	2	
(Senegal) Oumar Sène	MF	1985–1992	200	18	9	

=== 100–199 appearances ===
Player	Position	Paris Saint-Germain	Appearances	Goals	Assists	Source
(Germany) Julian Draxler	MF	2017–2023	198	26	35	
(France) Christophe Jallet	DF	2009–2014	198	9	20	
(Brazil) Ceará	DF	2007–2012	197	3	10	
(France) Lionel Letizi	GK	2000–2006	196	0	1	
(France) Jérémy Clément	MF	2007–2011	192	6	5	
(Italy) Salvatore Sirigu	GK	2011–2016	190	0	0	
(France) Warren Zaïre-Emery	MF	2022–	183	11	13	
(France) Michel Bibard	DF	1985–1991	182	2	3	
(Sweden) Zlatan Ibrahimović	FW	2012–2016	180	156	53	
(France) Peguy Luyindula	FW	2007–2012	180	37	13	
(France) Jérôme Rothen	MF	2004–2010	180	13	52	
(Portugal) Nuno Mendes	DF	2021–	177	14	23	
(France) Jimmy Algerino	DF	1996–2001	176	9	11	
(France) Jacques Laposte	MF	1972–1979	175	17	7	
(France) Thierry Morin	DF	1975–1986	174	1	1	
(Brazil) Neymar	FW	2017–2023	173	118	70	
(Chad) Nambatingue Toko	FW	1980–1985	171	43	21	
(Spain) Fabián Ruiz	MF	2022–	167	16	26	
(France) Frédéric Déhu	DF	2000–2004	167	8	5	
(France) Jérôme Leroy	MF	1996–2000, 2002–2003	166	12	9	
(Argentina) Ezequiel Lavezzi	FW	2012–2016	161	35	13	
(France) Guillaume Hoarau	FW	2008–2013	161	56	11	
(Italy) Gianluigi Donnarumma	GK	2021–2025	161	0	0	
(France) David Ginola	FW	1992–1995	158	44	23	
(Portugal) Danilo Pereira	MF	2020–2024	157	10	3	
(Brazil) Ricardo	DF	1991–1995	155	17	3	
(France) Layvin Kurzawa	DF	2015–2024	154	14	16	
(Brazil) Valdo	MF	1991–1995	153	16	40	
(France) Bradley Barcola	FW	2023–2026	152	39	34	
(France) Mickaël Landreau	GK	2006–2009	151	0	0	
(France) Jean-François Charbonnier	DF	1984–1991	151	15	1	
(France) Dominique Lokoli	DF	1974–1979	149	2	4	
(France) Pierre Ducrocq	MF	1994–2002	148	3	5	
(Colombia) Mario Yepes	DF	2004–2008	143	10	2	
(France) Christian Perez	FW	1988–1992	139	26	19	
(Liberia) George Weah	FW	1992–1995	138	55	11	
(France) Antoine Kombouaré	DF	1990–1995	137	8	4	
(France) Ousmane Dembélé	FW	2023–	135	61	38	
(Madagascar) Éric Rabésandratana	DF	1997–2001	135	9	0	
(Netherlands) Gregory van der Wiel	DF	2012–2016	132	4	17	
(France) Fabrice Pancrate	FW	2004–2009	132	14	9	
(Argentina) Gabriel Heinze	DF	2001–2004	132	8	5	
(Portugal) Gonçalo Ramos	FW	2023–2026	131	45	8	
(Germany) Thilo Kehrer	DF	2018–2022	128	4	2	
(Belgium) Thomas Meunier	DF	2016–2020	128	13	20	
(Spain) Juan Bernat	DF	2018–2025	128	8	12	
(France) Ludovic Giuly	FW	2008–2011	125	19	20	
(France) Pierre Reynaud	MF	1986–1994	125	4	4	
(South Korea) Lee Kang-in	MF	2023–2026	124	16	16	
(France) Jacky Novi	DF	1974–1977	122	2	1	
(France) Philippe Col	DF	1978–1983	119	1	3	
(France) Claude Makélélé	MF	2008–2011	118	1	4	
(Argentina) Leandro Paredes	MF	2019–2023	117	3	9	
(France) Patrice Loko	FW	1995–1998	115	36	8	
(Costa Rica) Keylor Navas	GK	2019–2024	114	0	0	
(France) Didier Domi	DF	1995–1998, 2001–2004	114	1	3	
(Senegal) Boubacar Sarr	FW	1979–1983	114	31	4	
(Socialist Federal Republic of Yugoslavia) Ilija Pantelić	GK	1974–1977	114	0	0	
(France) Fabrice Poullain	DF	1985–1988	113	4	1	
(Morocco) Talal El Karkouri	DF	2000–2004	113	2	4	
(Nigeria) Jay-Jay Okocha	MF	1998–2002	113	20	12	
(France) Bruno Ngotty	DF	1995–1998	113	10	3	
(Argentina) Gabriel Calderón	MF	1987–1990	113	23	22	
(Brazil) Nenê	MF	2010–2013	112	48	34	
(Senegal) Idrissa Gueye	MF	2019–2022	111	7	5	
(France) Jérémy Ménez	MF	2011–2014	110	19	26	
(Turkey) Mevlüt Erdinç	FW	2009–2012	110	30	10	
(France) José Cobos	DF	1993–1996	110	1	2	
(France) Amara Simba	FW	1986–1993	109	22	2	
(France) Alphonse Areola	GK	2012–2022	107	0	0	
(France) Lucas Hernandez	DF	2023–	106	2	4	
(Benin) Stéphane Sessègnon	MF	2008–2011	105	10	17	
(France) Denis Bauda	MF	1974–1977	103	0	2	
(France) Désiré Doué	MF	2024–	102	29	22	
(France) Fabrice Fiorèse	MF	2001–2004	102	20	20	
(Ecuador) Willian Pacho	DF	2024–	101	2	3	
(Cameroon) Modeste M'bami	MF	2003–2006	101	1	1	
(France) Jérôme Alonzo	GK	2001–2008	101	0	0	
(France) Jean-Pierre Dogliani	FW	1973–1976	100	26	8	

=== 75–99 appearances ===
Player	Position	Paris Saint-Germain	Appearances	Goals	Assists	Source
(Spain) Pablo Sarabia	MF	2019–2023	98	22	11	
(Portugal) João Neves	MF	2024–	97	14	13	
(France) Bernard Béréau	DF	1970–1974	97	10	0	
(Mali) Sammy Traoré	DF	2006–2011	96	4	1	
(France) Thierry Bacconnier	DF	1982–1988	96	2	5	
(Czech Republic) David Rozehnal	DF	2005–2007	96	1	2	
(France) Laurent Leroy	FW	1998–2003	95	20	4	
(France) Pascal Nouma	FW	1991–1996	95	14	4	
(Spain) Ander Herrera	MF	2019–2023	95	6	7	
(Argentina) Mauricio Pochettino	DF	2001–2003	95	6	0	
(France) Jean-Louis Brost	FW	1970–1974	93	20	0	
(France) Camille Choquier	GK	1970–1974	93	0	0	
(Argentina) Mauro Icardi	FW	2019–2023	92	38	7	
(France) Daniel Xuereb	FW	1986–1989	92	22	7	
(Brazil) Alex	DF	2012–2014	92	9	0	
(Germany) Kevin Trapp	GK	2015–2019	91	0	0	
(France) Mathieu Bodmer	MF	2010–2013	91	13	8	
(France) Michel N'Gom	FW	1981–1984	90	26	4	
(Brazil) David Luiz	DF	2014–2016	89	8	2	
(Ivory Coast) Amara Diané	FW	2006–2008	89	20	3	
(Brazil) Lucas Beraldo	DF	2024–	87	5	1	
(France) Alain Couriol	FW	1983–1989	86	9	1	
(France) François Brisson	FW	1975–1981	86	7	8	
(Russia) Igor Yanovsky	DF	1998–2001	86	2	2	
(France) Senny Mayulu	MF	2024–	85	13	8	
(France) José-Karl Pierre-Fanfan	DF	2003–2005	85	3	1	
(France) Louis Cardiet	DF	1973–1976	85	1	0	
(France) Laurent Robert	MF	1999–2001	84	33	12	
(Panama) Julio Dely Valdés	FW	1995–1997	84	29	12	
(Algeria) Lyazid Sandjak	FW	1986–1992	84	8	3	
(Spain) Cristóbal Parralo	DF	2001–2003	83	0	0	
(Albania) Lorik Cana	DF	2002–2005	81	2	3	
(Ivory Coast) Serge Aurier	DF	2014–2017	81	5	14	
(France) Jean-Louis Leonetti	MF	1971–1972, 1973–1974	81	3	0	
(Argentina) Carlos Bianchi	FW	1977–1979	80	71	9	
(Italy) Marco Simone	FW	1997–1999	80	32	11	
(Georgia (country)) Khvicha Kvaratskhelia	FW	2025–	80	27	17	
(France) Francis Piasecki	MF	1975–1977	79	18	7	
(France) Thierry Rabat	DF	1986–1990	78	3	0	
(Brazil) Reinaldo	FW	2003–2005	78	15	12	
(Brazil) Aloísio	FW	2001–2003	78	19	8	
(France) Colin Dagba	DF	2018–2024	77	1	5	
(France) Christopher Nkunku	MF	2015–2019	77	11	5	
(France) Kevin Gameiro	FW	2011–2013	77	23	1	
(France) Lionel Potillon	DF	2001–2003	77	2	1	
(Brazil) Ronaldinho	MF	2001–2003	77	25	22	
(France) Yannick Guillochon	DF	1982–1985	77	2	2	
(France) Christian André	FW	1972–1977	77	42	0	
(France) Jean-Luc Sassus	DF	1992–1994	76	4	2	
(Argentina) Lionel Messi	FW	2021–2023	75	32	34	
(Senegal) Abdou Diallo	DF	2019–2023	75	0	4	
(France) Philippe Redon	FW	1976–1978	75	9	10	
(Ivory Coast) Siaka Tiéné	DF	2010–2013	75	1	3	
(Portugal) Hugo Leal	MF	2001–2004	75	3	3	
(Nigeria) Bartholomew Ogbeche	FW	2001–2005	75	8	0	
(France) Pascal Zaremba	DF	1982–1984	75	12	8	

=== 50–74 appearances ===
Player	Position	Paris Saint-Germain	Appearances	Goals	Assists	Source
(France) Bernard Guignedoux	MF	1970–1972	74	15	0	
(France) Michel Prost	FW	1970–1972	74	22	0	
(Brazil) Dani Alves	DF	2017–2019	73	8	16	
(Ivory Coast) Bonaventure Kalou	FW	2005–2007	72	18	14	
(Armenia) Apoula Edel	GK	2007–2011	71	0	0	
(Brazil) Christian	FW	1999–2001	71	28	7	
(Socialist Federal Republic of Yugoslavia) Zlatko Vujović	FW	1989–1991	70	22	4	
(France) Nicolas Anelka	FW	1996–1997, 2000–2002	69	19	6	
(France) Roland Mitoraj	DF	1970–1972	69	0	0	
(France) Jean Djorkaeff	DF	1970–1972	68	7	0	
(Brazil) Paulo César	DF	2002–2007	67	6	2	
(France) Jean-Noël Huck	MF	1979–1981	64	2	6	
(Spain) Carlos Soler	MF	2022–2025	63	8	7	
(Algeria) Ali Benarbia	MF	1999–2001	62	2	16	
(France) Jacky Bade	DF	1973–1977	62	0	0	
(Senegal) Aliou Cissé	DF	1998–2001	61	2	2	
(France) Jean-Pierre Bosser	DF	1989–1991	60	0	2	
(France) Jean-Claude Bras	FW	1970–1972	60	21	0	
(France) Michel Marella	FW	1972–1975	59	14	0	
(Cameroon) Jean-Pierre Tokoto	FW	1975–1977	59	17	8	
(France) Stéphane Pichot	DF	2004–2006	59	0	1	
(Spain) Sergio Ramos	DF	2021–2023	58	6	1	
(France) Bernard Allou	MF	1994–1998	58	5	3	
(France) Lionel Justier	MF	1975–1978	58	6	2	
(France) Yohan Cabaye	MF	2013–2015	57	3	3	
(France) Jean Deloffre	MF	1973–1975	57	4	1	
(Serbia) Danijel Ljuboja	FW	2003–2005	56	8	7	
(Netherlands) Pierre Vermeulen	FW	1985–1987	55	1	8	
(France) Grégory Bourillon	DF	2007–2010	55	0	4	
(France) Randal Kolo Muani	FW	2023–2026	54	11	7	
(Argentina) Giovani Lo Celso	MF	2017–2018	54	6	6	
(France) Alain Polaniok	MF	1986–1989	54	2	1	
(France) Jean-Christophe Bahebeck	FW	2011–2018	53	6	4	
(Serbia) Mateja Kežman	FW	2008–2011	53	10	4	
(Haiti) Jean-Eudes Maurice	FW	2008–2012	53	3	3	
(Spain) Mikel Arteta	MF	2000–2002	53	5	6	
(France) Oumar Dieng	DF	1994–1996	52	1	0	
(Cameroon) Eric Maxim Choupo-Moting	FW	2018–2020	51	9	4	
(Uruguay) Cristian Rodríguez	MF	2005–2007	50	3	9	
(France) Bruno Germain	DF	1991–1993	50	4	1	
(France) Gérard Janvion	DF	1983–1985	50	4	1	
(Togo) Othniel Dossevi	FW	1972–1975	50	16	0	

=== 25–49 appearances ===
Player	Position	Paris Saint-Germain	Appearances	Goals	Assists	Source
(France) Pierre-Alain Frau	FW	2006–2008	49	7	1	
(France) Benoît Cauet	MF	1996–1997	48	6	4	
(France) Xavier Gravelaine	MF	1993–1996, 1999–2000	48	7	3	
(Portugal) Humberto Coelho	DF	1975–1977	48	8	2	
(France) Louis Floch	FW	1974–1976	48	13	8	
(Spain) Marco Asensio	MF	2023–2025	47	7	11	
(Senegal) Younousse Sankharé	MF	2007–2010	47	1	5	
(Montenegro) Branko Bošković	MF	2003–2005	47	5	4	
(France) Florian Maurice	FW	1997–1998	47	15	3	
(France) Youri Djorkaeff	FW	1995–1996	47	20	7	
(Netherlands) Kees Kist	FW	1982–1983	47	18	2	
(France) Mickaël Madar	FW	1998–2001	46	17	6	
(France) Franck Gava	MF	1997–1998	46	4	5	
(Brazil) Leonardo	MF	1996–1997	46	10	15	
(France) Gérard Lanthier	MF	1984–1985	46	1	6	
(Brazil) Abel Braga	MF	1979–1981	46	10	1	
(France) Bernard Bureau	FW	1978–1981	46	11	8	
(Italy) Armando Bianchi	MF	1978–1980	45	5	6	
(France) Lucas Digne	DF	2013–2015, 2026–	45	0	5	
(France) Nordi Mukiele	DF	2022–2025	45	0	4	
(Netherlands) Mitchel Bakker	DF	2019–2021	45	0	2	
(France) Sylvain Distin	DF	2000–2001	45	0	2	
(Russia) Matvey Safonov	GK	2024–	44	0	0	
(Tunisia) Selim Benachour	MF	2000–2005	43	2	5	
(France) Jean-Pierre Adams	DF	1977–1979	43	2	2	
(France) Vikash Dhorasoo	MF	2005–2007	43	1	4	
(France) Nicolas Douchez	GK	2011–2016	43	0	0	
(France) Guy Nosibor	FW	1973–1978	42	6	1	
(Italy) Moise Kean	FW	2020–2021	41	17	1	
(France) Jacques Rémond	FW	1970–1972	41	15	0	
(France) Grégory Coupet	GK	2009–2011	41	0	0	
(Socialist Federal Republic of Yugoslavia) Ivica Šurjak	FW	1981–1982	40	12	6	
(Senegal) Jules Bocandé	FW	1986–1988	40	6	3	
(Senegal) Ibrahim Mbaye	FW	2024–2026	40	4	4	
(France) Benjamin Stambouli	MF	2015–2016	40	0	0	
(France) Jocelyn Angloma	DF	1990–1991	39	6	3	
(Brazil) Rafinha	MF	2020–2022	39	0	6	
(Portugal) Kenedy	MF	1996–1997	39	0	1	
(Netherlands) Georginio Wijnaldum	MF	2021–2023	38	3	3	
(France) Peter Luccin	MF	2000–2001	38	2	2	
(Senegal) Boukary Dramé	DF	2005–2007	38	0	2	
(France) Jean-Michel Moutier	GK	1984–1987	38	0	0	
(France) Antoine Garceran	DF	1979–1981	38	0	0	
(France) François Calderaro	FW	1992–1994	37	7	0	
(Italy) Albert Poli	MF	1974–1975	37	2	3	
(Mali) Mohamed Sissoko	MF	2011–2013	37	2	0	
(Ukraine) Illia Zabarnyi	DF	2025–	37	1	0	
(Slovakia) Milan Škriniar	DF	2023–2025	37	1	0	
(Uruguay) Manuel Ugarte	MF	2023–2024	37	0	2	
(France) Alain Goma	DF	1998–1999	37	0	1	
(France) Christophe Revault	GK	1997–1998	37	0	0	
(France) Jean-François Beltramini	FW	1979–1981	36	14	4	
(France) Bernard Dumot	MF	1972–1976	36	4	0	
(Italy) Alessandro Florenzi	DF	2020–2021	36	2	1	
(France) Alioune Touré	FW	2002–2004	35	1	1	
(Democratic Republic of the Congo) Granddi Ngoyi	MF	2006–2010	35	0	0	
(France) Didier Toffolo	DF	1979–1984	35	0	0	
(France) Gérard Hallet	MF	1971–1972	34	8	0	
(France) Moussa Diaby	FW	2018–2019	34	4	7	
(France) Jean-Philippe Séchet	FW	1994–1995	34	2	0	
(France) Claude Arribas	DF	1971–1972	34	2	0	
(France) Jean-Pierre Destrumelle	MF	1970–1972	34	1	0	
(France) Romain Rocchi	MF	2002–2004	34	0	1	
(France) Hugo Ekitike	FW	2022–2024	33	4	4	
(Germany) Christian Wörns	DF	1998–1999	33	2	0	
(France) Stéphane Mahé	DF	1995–1996	33	0	0	
(France) Hatem Ben Arfa	MF	2016–2018	32	4	4	
(Spain) Yuri Berchiche	DF	2017–2018	32	2	5	
(France) Daniel Bernard	GK	1977–1978	32	0	0	
(France) Jean-Paul Rostagni	DF	1971–1972	32	0	0	
(France) Jean-Kévin Augustin	FW	2015–2017	31	2	1	
(Russia) Sergei Semak	MF	2004–2006	31	1	0	
(France) Michel Béhier	DF	1972–1973	31	1	0	
(France) Guy Delhumeau	GK	1971–1972	31	0	0	
(France) Loris Arnaud	FW	2007–2012	30	4	0	
(France) William Ayache	DF	1986–1987	30	0	0	
(France) Christophe Landrin	MF	2005–2006	29	2	3	
(France) Charles-Édouard Coridon	MF	2004–2005	29	1	2	
(Brazil) Geraldão	DF	1991–1992	29	1	1	
(France) Nicolas Laspalles	DF	1998–2000	29	0	1	
(France) Claude Lowitz	DF	1985–1987	29	0	0	
(France) Robert Jacques	FW	1985–1986	28	6	0	
(Brazil) Alex Dias	FW	2001–2002	28	3	1	
(France) Robin Leclerc	MF	1972–1976	28	3	0	
(Argentina) Marcelo Gallardo	MF	2006–2008	28	2	2	
(France) Gérard Cenzato	DF	1974–1977	28	0	0	
(France) Bruno Roux	FW	1987–1988	27	2	2	
(Portugal) Renato Sanches	MF	2022–2026	27	2	0	
(France) Tripy Makonda	DF	2008–2011	27	0	0	
(France) Michel Bensoussan	GK	1975–1980, 1989–1990	27	0	0	
(France) Daniel Solas	DF	1971–1972	27	0	0	
(Portugal) Fernando Cruz	DF	1970–1971	27	0	0	
(Argentina) Martín Cardetti	FW	2002–2003	26	8	1	
(Argentina) Juan Pablo Sorín	DF	2003–2004	26	2	6	
(France) Stéphane Dalmat	MF	2000–2001	26	1	2	
(France) Lucas Chevalier	GK	2025–	26	0	0	
(France) Bruno Carotti	DF	1998–2000	26	0	0	
(France) Vincent Fernandez	GK	1996–1998	26	0	0	
(Brazil) Adaílton	FW	1998–1999	25	4	2	
(France) David Ngog	FW	2006–2008	25	3	1	
(France) Yann Lachuer	MF	1998–1999	25	2	1	
(Argentina) Omar da Fonseca	FW	1985–1986	25	2	1	
(Portugal) Filipe Teixeira	MF	2002–2005	25	1	2	
(Serbia) Milan Biševac	DF	2011–2012	25	1	1	
(France) Jean-Michel Larqué	MF	1977–1979	25	0	4	
(Italy) Gianluigi Buffon	GK	2018–2019	25	0	0	
(France) Jocelyn Rico	DF	1988–1989	25	0	0	
(France) Daniel Guicci	DF	1970–1972	25	0	0	
(France) Jean-Claude Fitte-Duval	DF	1970–1971	25	0	0	

=== 16–24 appearances ===
Player	Position	Paris Saint-Germain	Appearances	Goals	Assists	Source
(Spain) Sergio Rico	GK	2019–2024	24	0	0	
(Ghana) Alex Nyarko	MF	2002–2003	24	2	1	
(Albania) Edvin Murati	MF	1997–2000	24	1	4	
(Cameroon) Patrick Mboma	FW	1994–1997	24	6	3	
(France) Patrice Marquet	MF	1985–1988	24	2	2	
(Argentina) Ramón Heredia	DF	1977–1979	24	1	1	
(Brazil) André Luiz	MF	2002–2003	23	2	3	
(France) Grégory Paisley	DF	1998–2001	23	1	0	
(France) Dominique Casagrande	GK	1998–2001	23	0	0	
(France) Cyrille Pouget	FW	1996–1997	23	4	1	
(France) Jacky Planchard	GK	1973–1975	23	0	0	
(Democratic Republic of the Congo) Youssouf Mulumbu	MF	2006–2009	22	0	0	
(Portugal) Hélder	DF	2004–2005	22	1	0	
(Socialist Federal Republic of Yugoslavia) Vahid Halilhodžić	FW	1986–1987	22	9	1	
(France) Jean-Luc Vasseur	DF	1986–1992	22	0	0	
(Austria) Richard Niederbacher	FW	1984–1985	22	7	0	
(France) Thierry Tinmar	DF	1984–1985	22	0	0	
(France) Raymond Domenech	DF	1981–1982	22	1	0	
(France) Daniel Sanchez	FW	1981–1982	22	2	0	
(Portugal) João Alves	MF	1979–1980	22	0	3	
(Uruguay) Diego Lugano	DF	2011–2013	21	1	0	
(Nigeria) Godwin Okpara	DF	1999–2001	21	0	0	
(France) Pierre Dréossi	DF	1988–1989	21	0	1	
(France) Bernard Moraly	MF	1975–1978	21	0	0	
(Israel) Mordechai Spiegler	FW	1973–1974	21	10	0	
(Guinea) Kaba Diawara	FW	2000–2003	20	2	3	
(France) Bruno Rodriguez	FW	1998–2000	20	6	0	
(France) Pascal Schmitt	DF	1972–1973	20	0	0	
(France) El Chadaille Bitshiabu	DF	2021–2023	19	0	0	
(France) Lassana Diarra	MF	2018–2019	19	0	1	
(France) Didier Digard	MF	2007–2008	19	0	0	
(France) David Hellebuyck	MF	2006–2007	19	1	1	
(France) Éric Cubilier	DF	2003–2004	19	0	0	
(Poland) Grzegorz Krychowiak	MF	2016–2019	19	0	0	
(Spain) Jesé	FW	2016–2020	18	2	0	
(Brazil) Edmílson	MF	1997	18	0	0	
(Cameroon) William N'Jo Léa	FW	1984–1985	18	4	0	
(France) Didier Ledunois	DF	1972–1974	18	1	0	
(Brazil) Souza	MF	2008–2009	17	0	1	
(France) Stéphane Pédron	MF	2002–2003	17	2	1	
(France) Éric Martin	MF	1986–1988	17	1	0	
(Argentina) Osvaldo Ardiles	MF	1982–1983	17	1	1	
(France) Stanley N'Soki	DF	2017–2019	16	0	2	
(France) Hervin Ongenda	FW	2013–2017	16	2	1	
(Uruguay) Carlos Bueno	FW	2005–2006	16	2	1	
(France) Gilles Cardinet	MF	1979–1985	16	1	0	
(France) Pierre Bajoc	DF	1973–1980	16	0	0	
(France) Patrice Zbinden	DF	1972–1975	16	0	0	

=== 8–15 appearances ===
Player	Position	Paris Saint-Germain	Appearances	Goals	Assists	Source
(France) Quentin Ndjantou	FW	2025–	15	1	2	
(France) Timothée Pembélé	DF	2020–2023	15	1	1	
(France) Sylvain Léandri	DF	1971–1972	15	0	0	
(France) Jean-Michel Badiane	DF	2004–2006	15	1	0	
(France) Nicolas Ouédec	FW	1998–1999	15	1	0	
(Liberia) James Debbah	FW	1997–1998	15	1	1	
(France) Yvon Le Roux	DF	1989–1990	15	1	0	
(France) Dominique Berthaud	DF	1975–1976	15	0	0	
(Cameroon) Junior Dina Ebimbe	MF	2021–2023	14	0	1	
(England) David Beckham	MF	2013	14	0	2	
(France) Richard Dutruel	GK	1991–1995	14	0	0	
(France) Philippe Jean	DF	1977–1979	14	0	0	
(France) Tanguy Nianzou	DF	2019–2020	13	3	1	
(Spain) Dro Fernández	MF	2026–	13	1	0	
(Democratic Republic of the Congo) Larrys Mabiala	DF	2006–2009	13	1	0	
(Cameroon) Jean-Hugues Ateba	DF	2004–2006	13	0	0	
(France) Christian Zajaczkowski	DF	1987–1990	13	0	0	
(France) Manuel Abreu	DF	1983–1984	13	0	0	
(Portugal) Gonçalo Guedes	FW	2017–2018	13	0	1	
(Brazil) César Belli	DF	1999–2000	12	1	0	
(Spain) Ismaël Gharbi	FW	2021–2024	12	0	1	
(France) Rudy Haddad	MF	2004–2006	12	0	0	
(France) David Rinçon	FW	1989–1992	12	0	0	
(France) Jean-François Douis	MF	1978–1979	12	0	0	
(France) Yoram Zague	DF	2024–	11	1	0	
(Netherlands) Xavi Simons	MF	2021–2022, 2023–2025	11	0	1	
(Algeria) Salah Assad	FW	1983–1984	11	1	3	
(Portugal) Agostinho	MF	2001–2002	10	1	0	
(England) Ray Wilkins	MF	1987–1988	10	0	0	
(France) Pascal Havet	DF	1984–1985	10	0	0	
(France) Hervé Porquet	FW	1977–1979	10	2	0	
(Brazil) Armando Monteiro	FW	1973–1974	9	4	0	
(Democratic Republic of the Congo) Neeskens Kebano	MF	2010–2012	9	1	0	
(France) André Travetto	DF	1975–1976	9	0	0	
(France) Christian Quéré	DF	1972–1975	9	0	0	
(France) Patrice Py	GK	1970–1974	9	0	0	
(Brazil) Vampeta	MF	2000–2001	8	1	0	
(Spain) Arnau Tenas	GK	2023–2025	8	0	2	
(France) Thierry Laurey	MF	1990–1991	8	0	1	
(France) Édouard Michut	MF	2021–2024	8	0	1	
(France) Luc Borrelli	GK	1993–1995	8	0	0	
(France) Bernard Héréson	DF	1991–1992	8	0	0	
(France) Gilles Brisson	DF	1977–1978	8	0	0	

=== 1–7 appearances ===
Player	Position	Paris Saint-Germain	Appearances	Goals	Assists	Source
(France) Kays Ruiz-Atil	MF	2020–2021	7	0	0	
(France) Jonathan Ikoné	MF	2016–2018	7	0	0	
(France) Gaël Hiroux	FW	2001–2002	7	2	0	
(Portugal) Hélder Baptista	MF	1999	7	0	0	
(France) Pierre Bianconi	DF	1987–1988	7	0	1	
(France) Bernard Caron	DF	1979–1980	7	0	0	
(Algeria) Mohamed Ali Messaoud	FW	1976–1977	7	1	0	
(France) Daniel Horlaville	FW	1971–1972	7	0	0	
(France) Thierry Carré	FW	1970–1971	7	0	0	
(France) Bandiougou Fadiga	MF	2020–2022	6	0	0	
(United States) Timothy Weah	FW	2018–2019	6	2	0	
(Bosnia and Herzegovina) Vedad Ibišević	FW	2004–2005	6	0	0	
(France) Bernard Pardo	MF	1991–1992	6	0	0	
(Senegal) Alboury Lah	FW	1990–1993	6	0	1	
(France) Claude Barrabé	GK	1986–1988	6	0	0	
(France) Patrice Turpin	DF	1972–1973	6	0	0	
(France) Bernard Lambert	DF	1972–1973	6	0	0	
(France) Ethan Mbappé	MF	2023–2024	5	0	0	
(France) Arnaud Kalimuendo	FW	2020–2022	5	0	0	
(Cameroon) Albert Baning	MF	2006–2010	5	0	0	
(Ivory Coast) Franck Dja Djédjé	FW	2003–2006	5	0	0	
(Spain) Quique de Lucas	MF	2000–2001	5	0	0	
(France) Fabrice Abriel	MF	1999–2001	5	0	0	
(France) Didier Martel	FW	1997–1998	5	0	0	
(France) Roméo Calenda	MF	1993–1997	5	0	1	
(France) Alain Préfaci	FW	1981–1984	5	1	0	
(France) Thierry Coutard	MF	1972–1973	5	0	0	
(France) Claude Rivet	DF	1972–1973	5	0	0	
(France) Kévin Rimane	DF	2016–2019	5	0	0	
(Italy) Cher Ndour	MF	2023–2025	4	1	0	
(France) Kingsley Coman	FW	2013–2014	4	0	0	
(Ivory Coast) Yannick Boli	FW	2007–2008	4	1	0	
(Serbia) Marko Pantelić	FW	1997–1998	4	0	0	
(France) Philippe Dehouck	MF	1987–1988	4	0	0	
(France) Patrice Ségura	FW	1984–1985	4	1	0	
(France) Marcel Defalco	FW	1983–1984	4	1	0	
(France) Dominique Barberat	MF	1975–1977	4	1	0	
(France) Pierre Phelipon	DF	1970–1971	4	0	0	
(France) Adil Aouchiche	MF	2019–2020	3	1	0	
(France) Maghnes Akliouche	MF	2026–	3	0	0	
(Italy) Renato Marin	GK	2025–	3	0	0	
(France) Noham Kamara	DF	2025–2026	3	0	0	
(France) Axel Tape	MF	2025	3	0	0	
(France) Loïc Mbe Soh	DF	2019–2020	3	0	0	
(France) Antoine Bernède	MF	2018–2019	3	0	0	
(Algeria) Florian Makhedjouf	MF	2010–2011	3	0	0	
(Brazil) Éverton Santos	FW	2008–2011	3	0	0	
(France) Maxime Partouche	MF	2006–2010	3	0	0	
(Democratic Republic of the Congo) Chiguy Lucau	FW	2002–2004	3	0	0	
(France) Fabrice Kelban	DF	1997–2000	3	0	0	
(Cameroon) Fabrice Moreau	MF	1984–1989	3	0	0	
(France) Olivier Martinez	DF	1985–1991	3	0	0	
(France) Michel Llodra	MF	1973–1974	3	0	0	
(England) Jantzen Derrick	FW	1971–1972	3	0	0	
(France) Stéphane Persol	DF	1987–1991	2	1	0	
(France) Laurent Pimond	FW	1984–1986	2	1	0	
(Togo) Pierre-Antoine Dossevi	FW	1975–1976	2	1	0	
(France) Dominique Delplanque	FW	1970–1971	2	1	0	
(France) Dimitri Lucea	DF	2026–	2	0	0	
(France) Noah Nsoki	MF	2025–2026	2	0	0	
(France) Mathis Jangéal	MF	2025–2026	2	0	0	
(Morocco) Ilyes Housni	FW	2023–2026	2	0	0	
(France) Alexandre Letellier	GK	2020–2024	2	0	0	
(Poland) Marcin Bułka	GK	2019–2022	2	0	0	
(France) Samuel Piètre	MF	2006–2007	2	0	0	
(France) Cédric Pardeilhan	MF	1995–1996	2	0	0	
(Brazil) Joel Camargo	DF	1971–1972	2	0	0	
(Spain) Ferran Torres	FW	2026–	1	2	0	
(Belgium) Mika Godts	FW	2026–	1	0	0	
(France) Pierre Mounguengue	FW	2026	1	0	0	
(France) David Boly	DF	2025–	1	0	0	
(France) Djeidi Gassama	FW	2022–2023	1	0	0	
(France) Sekou Yansané	FW	2021–2022	1	0	0	
(France) Kenny Nagera	FW	2021–2023	1	0	0	
(France) Nathan Bitumazala	MF	2021–2022	1	0	0	
(Turkey) Metehan Güçlü	FW	2019	1	1	0	
(France) Arthur Zagré	DF	2019	1	0	0	
(France) Yacine Adli	MF	2018–2019	1	0	0	
(France) Antoine Conte	DF	2012–2013	1	0	0	
(France) Ronan Le Crom	GK	2012–2013	1	0	0	
(Mali) Kalifa Traoré	DF	2013–2014	1	0	0	
(France) Jérémi Kimmakon	MF	2014–2015	1	0	0	
(Ivory Coast) Yakou Méïté	FW	2015–2016	1	0	0	
(France) Timothée Taufflieb	FW	2015–2016	1	0	0	
(France) Lorenzo Callegari	MF	2016–2018	1	0	0	
(Morocco) Yacine Qasmi	FW	2010–2011	1	0	0	
(France) Loïck Landre	DF	2010–2011	1	0	0	
(France) Willy Grondin	GK	2009–2010	1	0	0	
(Tunisia) Hocine Ragued	MF	2005–2006	1	0	0	
(Ivory Coast) Sol Bamba	DF	2004–2006	1	0	0	
(Luxembourg) Stéphane Gillet	GK	2001–2002	1	0	0	
(Algeria) Djamel Belmadi	FW	1992–1996	1	0	0	
(France) Jean-Claude Fernandes	DF	1993–1994	1	0	0	
(France) Joël Cloarec	FW	1992–1993	1	0	0	
(France) Thomas Kokkinis	GK	1990–1991	1	0	0	
(France) Sylvain Bied	GK	1984–1985	1	0	0	
(France) Franck Mérelle	GK	1978–1985	1	0	0	
(France) Jean-Luc Girard	MF	1984–1985	1	0	0	
(France) Franck Vandecasteele	FW	1985–1990	1	0	0	
(France) Alec Georgen	DF	2016–2019	1	0	0	
(France) Patrick Grappin	DF	1979–1980	1	0	0	
(France) Mario Mongelli	FW	1978–1979	1	0	0	
(Tunisia) Kamel Ben Mustapha	FW	1972–1973	1	0	0	
(France) Richard Vanquelles	FW	1972–1973	1	1	0	
(France) Alain Garillière	MF	1970–1971	1	0	0	
(Socialist Federal Republic of Yugoslavia) Živko Lukić	MF	1970–1971	1	0	0	
