= Mohamed Ali Messaoud =

Algerian footballer (born 1953)

Personal information
- Full name: Mohamed Ali Messaoud
- Date of birth: 15 September 1953 (age 73)
- Place of birth: Annaba, French Algeria
- Height: 1.70 m (5 ft 7 in)
- Position: Forward

Senior career*
| Years | Team | Apps | (Gls) |
| 1970–1976 | Hamra Annaba | | |
| 1976 | Vitrolles | 0 | (0) |
| 1976–1978 | Paris Saint-Germain | 5 | (0) |
| 1977–1978 | → Alès (loan) | 12 | (0) |
| 1978–1980 | Alès | 39 | (5) |
| 1980–1997 | Hyères | | |

International career
| | Algeria | 16 | |

Managerial career
- 1997–1999: Bormes Mimosas Sport
- 1999–2001: ASPTT Hyères
- JSM Toulon
- Hyères U15
- * Club domestic league appearances and goals

Mohamed "Rida" Ali Messaoud (Arabic: محمد علي مسعود; born 15 September 1953) is an Algerian former professional footballer who played as a forward.

== Early life ==
Mohamed Ali Messaoud was born on 15 September 1953 in the town of Annaba in Algeria. His nickname is "Rida".

== Club career ==
Ali Messaoud began his career at Hamra Annaba, the club in his hometown of Annaba in Algeria. In 1976, he was scouted by Paris Saint-Germain while playing in a friendly match in Oran, and joined the club afterwards.

After leaving Hamra, Ali Messaoud faced some complications with his old club and the Algerian Football Federation. His career had been stopped temporarily, but on top of this, he got himself into more trouble. In 1976, he went to play a friendly match in the region of Marseille, for the small club of Vitrolles , and was given a license without his authorization.

Ali Messaoud scored his first and only goal for PSG in a Coupe de France match away to Caen on 12 March 1977, the final score being 2–0 in the favor of PSG. When PSG played against Marseille later that year, he had been recognized by Albert Emon, and was told off for having two separate deals with two separate clubs. Ali Messaoud was suspended before an agreement had even been reached with Vitrolles. He subsequently joined Alès in the Division 2.

A week before the beginning of the season while playing for Alès, Ali Messaoud suffered a serious knee injury in a friendly against Montpellier. Despite this, after several months on the sidelines, he continued his career with the club, and also played for Hyères later on.

== International career ==
Ali Messaoud played in the youth ranks of Algeria before making a total of 16 appearances for the Algeria national team.

== Style of play ==
Playing as a forward, usually as a right-winger, Ali Messaoud was a "very technical" player, but his "limited liveliness" prevented him from making a big impact at PSG. He was also described as an "excellent dribbler" of the ball in his day.

Ali Messaoud stated in an interview with PSG70 that he saw himself as a resistant and endurant player, and generous to his teammates in front of goal. "I usually preferred to make others score rather than scoring myself," he declared.

== After football ==
After retiring from football in 1997, Ali Messaoud became the manager of Bormes Mimosas Sport. In 1999, he switched clubs, and started coaching ASPTT Hyères.

In 2000, Ali Messaoud created a new club called Jeunesse Sportive Méditerrannéenne de Toulon; he would go on to coach, preside, and become the sporting director of the club until 2010. Simultaneously, he worked in the sports department for the town of Hyères, and also coached the U15s of Hyères FC.

== Career statistics ==
Appearances and goals by club, season and competition
| Club | Season | League | | | Cup | | Total | |
| Club | Season | Division | Apps | Goals | Apps | Goals | Apps | Goals |
|---|---|---|---|---|---|---|---|---|
| Paris Saint-Germain | 1976–77 | Division 1 | 5 | 0 | 2 | 1 | 7 | 1 |
| Alès (loan) | 1977–78 | Division 2 | 12 | 0 | 0 | 0 | 12 | 0 |
| Alès | 1978–79 | Division 2 | 18 | 3 | 0 | 0 | 18 | 3 |
| Alès | 1979–80 | Division 2 | 21 | 2 | 0 | 0 | 21 | 2 |
| Alès | Total | | 51 | 5 | 0 | 0 | 51 | 5 |
| Career total | | | 57 | 5 | 2 | 1 | 58 | 6 |
