= 1987–88 Paris Saint-Germain FC season =

18th season of Paris Saint-Germain

Paris Saint-Germain
1987–88 season
- President: Francis Borelli
- Manager: Gérard Houllier; Erick Mombaerts
- Stadium: Parc des Princes
- Ligue 1: 15th
- Coupe de France: Round of 32
- Top goalscorer: League: Oumar Sène (6); All: Oumar Sène (6)
- Average home league attendance: 19,507
Home colours	Away colours	Third colours

The 1987–88 season was the 18th season in the history of Paris Saint-Germain FC. PSG played their home league matches at the Parc des Princes, attracting an average of 19,507 spectators per match. The club's president was Francis Borelli. The team was managed by Gérard Houllier until October 1987, after which Erick Mombaerts took over from October to December. Houllier returned in February 1988 to lead the team for the second half of the campaign. Fabrice Poullain served as captain. PSG finished fifteenth in Ligue 1 and reached the round of 32 of the Coupe de France. Oumar Sène was the team's top scorer, netting 6 goals in the league.

== Players ==
=== Squad ===
Players who featured in at least one official match for the club.

Note: Flags indicate national team as defined under FIFA eligibility rules; some limited exceptions apply. Players may hold more than one non-FIFA nationality.

No.	Pos.	Nation	Player
—	GK	FRA	Joël Bats
—	DF	FRA	Thierry Rabat
—	DF	FRA	Michel Bibard
—	DF	FRA	Jean-Luc Vasseur
—	DF	FRA	Christian Zajaczkowski
—	DF	FRA	Jean-François Charbonnier
—	DF	FRA	Stéphane Persol
—	DF	FRA	Philippe Jeannol
—	DF	FRA	Pierre Bianconi
—	DF	FRA	Franck Tanasi
—	DF	FRA	Thierry Bacconnier
—	DF	FRA	Fabrice Poullain (captain)
—	MF	FRA	Pierre Reynaud
—	MF	FRA	Éric Martin

No.	Pos.	Nation	Player
—	MF	ENG	Ray Wilkins
—	MF	FRA	Olivier Martinez
—	MF	FRA	Philippe Dehouck
—	MF	SEN	Oumar Sène
—	MF	FRA	Patrice Marquet
—	MF	ARG	Gabriel Calderón
—	MF	YUG	Safet Sušić
—	FW	ALG	Liazid Sandjak
—	FW	FRA	Amara Simba
—	FW	FRA	Alain Couriol
—	FW	FRA	Daniel Xuereb
—	FW	FRA	Bruno Roux
—	FW	SEN	Jules Bocandé

=== Out on loan ===
Players who were loaned out to other clubs during the season.

Note: Flags indicate national team as defined under FIFA eligibility rules; some limited exceptions apply. Players may hold more than one non-FIFA nationality.

No.	Pos.	Nation	Player
—	DF	FRA	Jean-Marc Pilorget (at Cannes)
—	MF	CMR	Fabrice Moreau (at La Roche)

No.	Pos.	Nation	Player
—	MF	FRA	Alain Polaniok (at Cannes)
—	FW	SEN	Jules Bocandé (at Nice)

== Transfers ==
=== Arrivals ===
Players who signed for the club.

Note: Flags indicate national team as defined under FIFA eligibility rules; some limited exceptions apply. Players may hold more than one non-FIFA nationality.

No.	Pos.	Nation	Player
—	DF	FRA	Pierre Bianconi (from Bastia)
—	DF	FRA	Jean-François Charbonnier (from Cannes, end of loan)
—	DF	FRA	Stéphane Persol (from PSG Youth Academy)
—	DF	FRA	Christian Zajaczkowski (from Le Havre)

No.	Pos.	Nation	Player
—	MF	ARG	Gabriel Calderón (from Real Betis)
—	MF	FRA	Philippe Dehouck (from Thonon Evian)
—	MF	ENG	Ray Wilkins (from AC Milan)
—	FW	FRA	Bruno Roux (from Beauvais)

=== Departures ===
Players who left the club.

Note: Flags indicate national team as defined under FIFA eligibility rules; some limited exceptions apply. Players may hold more than one non-FIFA nationality.

No.	Pos.	Nation	Player
—	GK	FRA	Jean-Michel Moutier (Retired)
—	DF	FRA	William Ayache (to Marseille)
—	DF	FRA	Claude Lowitz (to Marseille)
—	MF	ENG	Ray Wilkins (to Rangers)

No.	Pos.	Nation	Player
—	FW	NED	Pierre Vermeulen (to Tours)
—	FW	YUG	Vahid Halilhodžić (Retired)
—	FW	FRA	Dominique Rocheteau (to Toulouse)

== Kits ==
RTL and Canal+ were the shirt sponsors, and Adidas was the kit supplier.

Home	Away	Third

== Competitions ==
=== Overview ===
Competition	First match	Last match	Starting round	Final position	Record							
Competition	First match	Last match	Starting round	Final position	Pld	W	D	L	GF	GA	GD	Win %
Ligue 1	18 July 1987	4 June 1988	Matchday 1	15th	38	12	10	16	36	45	−9	31.58
Coupe de France	12 March 1988	5 April 1988	Round of 64	Round of 32	3	1	0	2	2	6	−4	33.33
Total					41	13	10	18	38	51	−13	31.71

Source: Competitions

=== Ligue 1 ===
==== League table ====
Pos	Team	Pld	W	D	L	GF	GA	GD	Pts
13	Toulouse	38	14	7	17	35	47	−12	35
14	Laval	38	12	10	16	38	38	0	34
15	Paris Saint-Germain	38	12	10	16	36	45	−9	34
16	Nice	38	15	3	20	42	47	−5	33
17	Lens	38	13	7	18	40	62	−22	33

Source: Histoire du PSG
Rules for classification: 1) points; 2) goal difference; 3) number of goals scored.
Victory: 2 points, Draw: 1 point, Defeat: 0 points

==== Results by round ====
Round	1	2	3	4	5	6	7	8	9	10	11	12	13	14	15	16	17	18	19	20	21	22	23	24	25	26	27	28	29	30	31	32	33	34	35	36	37	38
Ground	H	A	H	H	A	H	A	H	A	H	A	H	A	H	A	H	A	H	A	H	A	A	H	A	H	A	H	A	H	A	H	A	H	A	H	A	H	A
Result	W	L	W	D	W	L	W	W	L	L	L	W	L	L	L	L	L	D	D	W	L	D	L	L	D	D	W	L	D	W	D	D	L	L	D	W	W	W
Position	6	12	4	4	3	4	3	2	3	7	12	5	9	14	16	16	18	18	18	15	18	17	18	18	18	18	18	18	18	18	18	17	18	18	18	18	17	15

Source: Histoire du PSG
A = Away; H = Home; W = Win; D = Draw; L = Loss

==== Matches ====
18 July 1987 1	Paris Saint-Germain	2–0	Le Havre	Paris
	Bocandé 39'; Marquet 88'	Report		Stadium: Parc des Princes; Attendance: 14,655; Referee: Claude Bouillet

25 July 1987 2	Montpellier	4–1	Paris Saint-Germain	Montpellier
	Júlio César 43'; Milla 54', 59'; Blanc 74'	Report	Sušić 73'	Stadium: Stade de la Mosson; Attendance: 12,221; Referee: Jean-Claude Swirog

1 August 1987 3	Paris Saint-Germain	2–0	Toulouse	Paris
	Charbonnier 24'; Lestage 43' (o.g.)	Report		Stadium: Parc des Princes; Attendance: 23,123; Referee: Michel De Zayas

8 August 1987 4	Paris Saint-Germain	0–0	Brest	Paris
		Report		Stadium: Parc des Princes; Attendance: 11,715; Referee: Robert Wurtz

15 August 1987 5	Niort	1–2	Paris Saint-Germain	Niort
	Tholot 44'	Report	Charbonnier 14'; Sušić 70'	Stadium: Stade René Gaillard; Attendance: 11,298; Referee: Jean-Claude Bourgeois

19 August 1987 6	Paris Saint-Germain	0–1	Monaco	Paris
		Report	Hateley 41'	Stadium: Parc des Princes; Attendance: 40,545; Referee: Jean-Louis Rideau

22 August 1987 7	Cannes	1–3	Paris Saint-Germain	Cannes
	Savić 14'	Report	Charbonnier 19'; Rabat 40'; Marquet 88'	Stadium: Stade Pierre de Coubertin; Attendance: 10,507; Referee: Jean-Marie Sculfort

29 August 1987 8	Paris Saint-Germain	1–0	Bordeaux	Paris
	Roche 29' (o.g.)	Report		Stadium: Parc des Princes; Attendance: 30,550; Referee: Jean-Marie Lartigot

2 September 1987 9	Toulon	1–0	Paris Saint-Germain	Toulon
	Pardo 89'	Report		Stadium: Stade Mayol; Attendance: 11,266; Referee: Jean-Claude Hirtz

12 September 1987 10	Paris Saint-Germain	1–3	Lille	Paris
	Calderón 89' (pen.)	Report	Desmet 11'; Vandenbergh 25', 34' (pen.)	Stadium: Parc des Princes; Attendance: 13,993; Referee: Michel Vautrot

19 September 1987 11	Laval	2–0	Paris Saint-Germain	Laval
	Philippe 42', 89'	Report		Stadium: Stade Francis Le Basser; Attendance: 7,715; Referee: Rémi Harrel

26 September 1987 12	Paris Saint-Germain	3–0	Saint-Étienne	Paris
	Sène 50', 55'; Calderón 59'	Report		Stadium: Parc des Princes; Attendance: 37,284; Referee: Gérard Biguet

2 October 1987 13	Racing Paris	2–1	Paris Saint-Germain	Paris
	Buscher 23'; Francescoli 69'	Report 1 Report 2	Jeannol 84'	Stadium: Parc des Princes; Attendance: 23,414; Referee: Jean-Claude Swirog

7 October 1987 14	Paris Saint-Germain	0–2	Nantes	Paris
		Report	Anziani 43'; Kombouaré 60'	Stadium: Parc des Princes; Attendance: 19,769; Referee: Michel De Zayas

17 October 1987 15	Nice	2–0	Paris Saint-Germain	Nice
	Elsner 66'; Kurbos 80'	Report		Stadium: Stade du Ray; Attendance: 8,853; Referee: Michel Girard

24 October 1987 16	Paris Saint-Germain	0–2	Metz	Paris
		Report	Gaillot 20'; Zénier 50'	Stadium: Parc des Princes; Attendance: 11,065; Referee: Rémi Harrel

31 October 1987 17	Auxerre	3–0	Paris Saint-Germain	Auxerre
	Cantona 13'; Cocard 78'; Barret 86'	Report		Stadium: Stade de l'Abbé-Deschamps; Attendance: 12,000; Referee: Philippe Leduc

8 November 1987 18	Paris Saint-Germain	1–1	Marseille	Paris
	Simba 45'	Report	Sène 17' (o.g.)	Stadium: Parc des Princes; Attendance: 22,250; Referee: Gérard Biguet

11 November 1987 19	Lens	0–0	Paris Saint-Germain	Lens
		Report		Stadium: Stade Bollaert-Delelis; Attendance: 13,098; Referee: Robert Wurtz

21 November 1987 20	Paris Saint-Germain	2–1	Montpellier	Paris
	Simba 14'; Sandjak 64'	Report	Laurey 23'	Stadium: Parc des Princes; Attendance: 11,937; Referee: Jean-Marie Lartigot

28 November 1987 21	Toulouse	2–1	Paris Saint-Germain	Toulouse
	Despeyroux 29'; Stopyra 59'	Report	Sène 71'	Stadium: Stadium de Toulouse; Attendance: 8,068; Referee: Claude Bouillet

5 December 1987 22	Brest	0–0	Paris Saint-Germain	Brest
		Report		Stadium: Stade Francis-Le Blé; Attendance: 7,000; Referee: Jean-Marie Sculfort

12 December 1987 23	Paris Saint-Germain	1–3	Niort	Paris
	Couriol 77'	Report	Relmy 69'; Ribreau 70'; Cervetti 71'	Stadium: Parc des Princes; Attendance: 10,151; Referee: Jean-Pierre Blouet

18 December 1987 24	Monaco	2–1	Paris Saint-Germain	Monaco
	Ferratge 33'; Mège 67' (pen.)	Report	Bibard 73'	Stadium: Stade Louis II; Attendance: 4,185; Referee: Michel Girard

23 February 1988 25	Paris Saint-Germain	1–1	Cannes	Paris
	Sène 26'	Report	Savić 65' (pen.)	Stadium: Parc des Princes; Attendance: 10,972; Referee: Michel Vautrot

27 February 1988 26	Bordeaux	0–0	Paris Saint-Germain	Bordeaux
		Report		Stadium: Stade Chaban-Delmas; Attendance: 14,972; Referee: Robert Wurtz

5 March 1988 27	Paris Saint-Germain	1–0	Toulon	Paris
	Reynaud 9'	Report		Stadium: Parc des Princes; Attendance: 8,312; Referee: Alain Delmer

19 March 1988 28	Lille	1–0	Paris Saint-Germain	Lille
	Mobati 37'	Report		Stadium: Stade Grimonprez-Jooris; Attendance: 7,596; Referee: Michel De Zayas

26 March 1988 29	Paris Saint-Germain	0–0	Laval	Paris
		Report		Stadium: Parc des Princes; Attendance: 7,918; Referee: Philippe Leduc

2 April 1988 30	Saint-Étienne	1–3	Paris Saint-Germain	Saint-Étienne
	El Haddaoui 73'	Report	Sène 34', 43'; Reynaud 90'	Stadium: Stade Geoffroy-Guichard; Attendance: 17,592; Referee: Jean-Claude Hirtz

8 April 1988 31	Paris Saint-Germain	1–1	Racing Paris	Paris
	Sandjak 87'	Report	Krimau 60'	Stadium: Parc des Princes; Attendance: 13,486; Referee: Jean-Marie Lartigot

16 April 1988 32	Nantes	0–0	Paris Saint-Germain	Nantes
		Report		Stadium: Stade de la Beaujoire; Attendance: 10,614; Referee: Jean-Claude Swirog

30 April 1988 33	Paris Saint-Germain	0–4	Nice	Paris
		Report	Marsiglia 10'; Kurbos 37'; Guérit 50'; Elsner 79'	Stadium: Parc des Princes; Attendance: 8,779; Referee: Michel Vautrot

7 May 1988 34	Metz	1–0	Paris Saint-Germain	Metz
	Cartier 77'	Report		Stadium: Stade Saint-Symphorien; Attendance: 8,399; Referee: Gérard Biguet

14 May 1988 35	Paris Saint-Germain	1–1	Auxerre	Paris
	Roux 84'	Report	Dutuel 15'	Stadium: Parc des Princes; Attendance: 38,512; Referee: Claude Bouillet

21 May 1988 36	Marseille	1–2	Paris Saint-Germain	Marseille
	Papin 28'	Report	Sušić 23'; Calderón 86'	Stadium: Stade Vélodrome; Attendance: 21,084; Referee: Jean-Louis Rideau

27 May 1988 37	Paris Saint-Germain	4–1	Lens	Paris
	Xuereb 23', 37'; Calderón 33' (pen.); Martin 82'	Report	N'Jo Léa 70'	Stadium: Parc des Princes; Attendance: 35,624; Referee: Philippe Leduc

4 June 1988 38	Le Havre	0–1	Paris Saint-Germain	Le Havre
		Report	Xuereb 56'	Stadium: Stade Jules Deschaseaux; Attendance: 8,969; Referee: Jean-Marie Lartigot

=== Coupe de France ===
==== Round of 64 ====
12 March 1988 Single leg	Paris Saint-Germain	1–0	Libourne	Sens
	Simba 73'	Report		Stadium: Stade Fernand Sastre; Attendance: 3,169; Referee: Marcel Lainé

==== Round of 32 ====
30 March 1988 First leg	Paris Saint-Germain	1–3	Sochaux	Paris
	Charbonnier 8'	Report	Sauzée 50', 87'; Lucas 63'	Stadium: Parc des Princes; Attendance: 10,000; Referee: Jean-Marie Sculfort

5 April 1988 Second leg	Sochaux	3–0 (6–1 agg.)	Paris Saint-Germain	Montbéliard
	Sauzée 20'; Morin 49'; Henry 85'	Report		Stadium: Stade Auguste-Bonal; Attendance: 13,000; Referee: Gérard Biguet

== Statistics ==
=== Appearances and goals ===
27 players featured in at least one official match, and the club scored 38 goals in official competitions, including two own goals.

Rank	Player	Position	Appearances	Goals	Source
1	(France) Joël Bats	GK	41	0	
2	(France) Jean-François Charbonnier	DF	37	4	
3	(France) Michel Bibard	DF	35	1	
4	(France) Thierry Rabat	DF	35	1	
5	(Argentina) Gabriel Calderón	MF	34	4	
6	(France) Fabrice Poullain	DF	32	0	
7	(Senegal) Oumar Sène	MF	30	6	
8	(France) Bruno Roux	FW	27	1	
9	(Socialist Federal Republic of Yugoslavia) Safet Sušić	MF	26	3	
10	(France) Philippe Jeannol	DF	26	1	
11	(France) Pierre Reynaud	MF	24	2	
12	(France) Franck Tanasi	DF	24	0	
13	(Algeria) Lyazid Sandjak	FW	20	2	
14	(France) Daniel Xuereb	FW	19	3	
15	(France) Amara Simba	FW	18	3	
16	(France) Patrice Marquet	MF	16	2	
17	(France) Christian Zajaczkowski	DF	13	0	
18	(France) Jean-Luc Vasseur	DF	10	0	
19	(England) Ray Wilkins	MF	10	0	
20	(Senegal) Jules Bocandé	FW	9	1	
21	(France) Éric Martin	MF	9	1	
22	(France) Pierre Bianconi	DF	7	0	
23	(France) Thierry Bacconnier	DF	5	0	
24	(France) Alain Couriol	FW	4	1	
25	(France) Philippe Dehouck	MF	4	0	
26	(France) Olivier Martinez	DF	1	0	
27	(France) Stéphane Persol	DF	1	0	
