= 1989–90 Paris Saint-Germain FC season =

20th season of Paris Saint-Germain

Paris Saint-Germain
1989–90 season
- President: Francis Borelli
- Manager: Tomislav Ivić
- Stadium: Parc des Princes
- Ligue 1: 5th
- Coupe de France: Round of 64
- UEFA Europa League: Second round
- Top goalscorer: League: Zlatko Vujović (10); All: Zlatko Vujović (11)
- Average home league attendance: 17,397
Home colours	Away colours

The 1989–90 season was the 20th season in the history of Paris Saint-Germain FC. PSG played their home league matches at the Parc des Princes, attracting an average of 17,397 spectators per match. The club's president was Francis Borelli, and the team was managed by Tomislav Ivić, with Oumar Sène serving as captain. PSG finished fifth in Ligue 1, reached the round of 64 in the Coupe de France, and the second round of the UEFA Europa League. Zlatko Vujović was the team's top scorer, netting 11 goals in all competitions, including 10 in the league.

== Players ==
=== Squad ===
Players who featured in at least one official match for the club.

Note: Flags indicate national team as defined under FIFA eligibility rules; some limited exceptions apply. Players may hold more than one non-FIFA nationality.

No.	Pos.	Nation	Player
—	GK	FRA	Joël Bats
—	DF	FRA	Jean-Pierre Bosser
—	DF	FRA	Michel Bibard
—	DF	FRA	Yvon Le Roux
—	DF	FRA	Jean-François Charbonnier
—	DF	FRA	Philippe Jeannol
—	DF	FRA	Francis Llacer
—	DF	FRA	Franck Tanasi
—	DF	FRA	Thierry Rabat
—	MF	FRA	Pierre Reynaud

No.	Pos.	Nation	Player
—	MF	FRA	Daniel Bravo
—	MF	SEN	Oumar Sène (captain)
—	MF	ARG	Gabriel Calderón
—	MF	YUG	Safet Sušić
—	FW	ALG	Lyazid Sandjak
—	FW	FRA	Amara Simba
—	FW	FRA	Pascal Nouma
—	FW	FRA	David Rinçon
—	FW	YUG	Zlatko Vujović
—	FW	FRA	Christian Perez

=== Out on loan ===
Players who were loaned out to other clubs during the season.

Note: Flags indicate national team as defined under FIFA eligibility rules; some limited exceptions apply. Players may hold more than one non-FIFA nationality.

No.	Pos.	Nation	Player
—	GK	FRA	Claude Barrabé (at Brest)
—	DF	FRA	Christian Zajaczkowski (at Abbeville)

No.	Pos.	Nation	Player
—	FW	SEN	Alboury Lah (at Guingamp)
—	FW	FRA	Franck Vandecasteele (at Abbeville)

== Transfers ==
=== Arrivals ===
Players who signed for the club.

Note: Flags indicate national team as defined under FIFA eligibility rules; some limited exceptions apply. Players may hold more than one non-FIFA nationality.

No.	Pos.	Nation	Player
—	GK	FRA	Michel Bensoussan (from Caen)
—	DF	FRA	Jean-Pierre Bosser (from Nice)
—	DF	FRA	Yvon Le Roux (from Marseille)
—	DF	FRA	Francis Llacer (from PSG Youth Academy)
—	DF	FRA	Thierry Rabat (from Lens, end of loan)
—	DF	FRA	Christian Zajaczkowski (from Lens, end of loan)
—	MF	FRA	Daniel Bravo (from Nice)

No.	Pos.	Nation	Player
—	MF	FRA	Philippe Dehouck (from Annecy, end of loan)
—	MF	FRA	Patrice Marquet (from Bastia, end of loan)
—	FW	SEN	Alboury Lah (from Jaraaf)
—	FW	FRA	Pascal Nouma (from PSG Youth Academy)
—	FW	FRA	David Rinçon (from PSG Youth Academy)
—	FW	YUG	Zlatko Vujović (from Cannes)

=== Departures ===
Players who left the club.

Note: Flags indicate national team as defined under FIFA eligibility rules; some limited exceptions apply. Players may hold more than one non-FIFA nationality.

No.	Pos.	Nation	Player
—	DF	FRA	Pierre Dréossi (to Cannes)
—	DF	FRA	Jean-Marc Pilorget (to Guingamp)
—	DF	FRA	Jocelyn Rico (to Cannes)
—	MF	FRA	Philippe Dehouck (to Châtellerault)
—	MF	CMR	Fabrice Moreau (to Le Mans)

No.	Pos.	Nation	Player
—	MF	FRA	Alain Polaniok (to Red Star)
—	MF	FRA	Patrice Marquet (to Toulon)
—	FW	FRA	Alain Couriol (to Toulon)
—	FW	FRA	Daniel Xuereb (to Montpellier)

== Kits ==
RTL and TDK were the shirt sponsors, and Nike was the kit supplier.

Home	Away

== Competitions ==
=== Overview ===
Competition	First match	Last match	Starting round	Final position	Record							
Competition	First match	Last match	Starting round	Final position	Pld	W	D	L	GF	GA	GD	Win %
Ligue 1	22 July 1989	19 May 1990	Matchday 1	5th	38	18	6	14	50	48	+2	47.37
Coupe de France	17 February 1990		Round of 64	Round of 64	1	0	0	1	0	1	−1	0.00
UEFA Europa League	13 September 1989	1 November 1989	First round	Second round	4	1	1	2	4	5	−1	25.00
Total					43	19	7	17	54	54	+0	44.19

Source: Competitions

=== Ligue 1 ===
==== League table ====
Pos	Team	Pld	W	D	L	GF	GA	GD	Pts	Qualification or relegation
3	Monaco	38	15	16	7	38	24	+14	46	Qualification to UEFA Cup first round
4	Sochaux	38	17	9	12	46	39	+7	43	
5	Paris Saint-Germain	38	18	6	14	50	48	+2	42	
6	Auxerre	38	14	13	11	49	40	+9	41	
7	Nantes	38	13	14	11	42	34	+8	40	

Source: Histoire du PSG
Rules for classification: 1) points; 2) goal difference; 3) number of goals scored.
Victory: 2 points, Draw: 1 point, Defeat: 0 points

==== Results by round ====
Round	1	2	3	4	5	6	7	8	9	10	11	12	13	14	15	16	17	18	19	20	21	22	23	24	25	26	27	28	29	30	31	32	33	34	35	36	37	38
Ground	A	H	A	H	A	H	A	H	A	H	A	H	A	A	H	A	H	A	H	A	H	A	H	A	H	A	H	A	H	A	H	H	A	H	A	H	A	H
Result	D	W	L	W	W	W	W	D	D	W	L	D	L	L	L	L	D	W	L	W	W	L	W	L	W	W	L	L	W	L	W	W	W	W	L	D	L	W
Position	9	4	9	5	4	3	2	3	2	2	3	4	5	5	7	8	7	7	9	9	6	6	6	6	6	5	5	6	6	7	6	4	4	4	6	5	6	5

Source: Histoire du PSG
A = Away; H = Home; W = Win; D = Draw; L = Loss

==== Matches ====
22 July 1989 1	Nice	3–3	Paris Saint-Germain	Nice
	Langers 10'; Ricort 40'; Bocandé 47'	Report	Calderón 2', 48' (pen.); Jeannol 65'	Stadium: Stade du Ray; Attendance: 13,132; Referee: Jean-Claude Hirtz

29 July 1989 2	Paris Saint-Germain	1–0	Metz	Paris
	Sène 75'	Report		Stadium: Parc des Princes; Attendance: 23,000; Referee: Philippe Leduc

2 August 1989 3	Sochaux	1–0	Paris Saint-Germain	Montbéliard
	Thomas 85'	Report		Stadium: Stade Auguste-Bonal; Attendance: 7,000; Referee: Michel Girard

5 August 1989 4	Paris Saint-Germain	2–1	Montpellier	Paris
	Sušić 8'; Le Roux 62'	Report	Cantona 32'	Stadium: Parc des Princes; Attendance: 27,320; Referee: Michel De Zayas

12 August 1989 5	Saint-Étienne	1–2	Paris Saint-Germain	Saint-Étienne
	Witschge 46'	Report	Sušić 10'; Charbonnier 60'	Stadium: Stade Geoffroy-Guichard; Attendance: 15,000; Referee: Claude Bouillet

19 August 1989 6	Paris Saint-Germain	2–1	Lille	Paris
	Charbonnier 20'; Sušić 24'	Report	Mobati 71'	Stadium: Parc des Princes; Attendance: 14,310; Referee: Antoine de Pandis

26 August 1989 7	Brest	0–1	Paris Saint-Germain	Brest
		Report	Sušić 83'	Stadium: Stade Francis-Le Blé; Attendance: 12,474; Referee: Michel Vautrot

30 August 1989 8	Paris Saint-Germain	1–1	Toulon	Paris
	Perez 70'	Report	Jeannol 77' (o.g.)	Stadium: Parc des Princes; Attendance: 18,786; Referee: Alain Delmer

9 September 1989 9	Racing Paris	2–2	Paris Saint-Germain	Paris
	Lima 5'; Fernier 15'	Report 1 Report 2	Calderón 25' (pen.), 87' (pen.)	Stadium: Parc des Princes; Attendance: 25,000; Referee: Jean-Claude Swirog

16 September 1989 10	Paris Saint-Germain	2–1	Monaco	Paris
	Bravo 60'; Vujović 70'	Report	Jeannol 82' (o.g.)	Stadium: Parc des Princes; Attendance: 17,095; Referee: Gérard Biguet

23 September 1989 11	Cannes	3–1	Paris Saint-Germain	Cannes
	Bray 45'; Ferri 60'; Bellone 62'	Report	Rabat 41'	Stadium: Stade Pierre de Coubertin; Attendance: 8,007; Referee: Jean-Claude Bourgeois

30 September 1989 12	Paris Saint-Germain	1–1	Bordeaux	Paris
	Allofs 55'	Report	Calderón 84' (pen.)	Stadium: Parc des Princes; Attendance: 27,519; Referee: Michel Vautrot

4 October 1989 13	Caen	2–0	Paris Saint-Germain	Caen
	Stein 8'; Rio 32'	Report		Stadium: Stade de Venoix; Attendance: 10,225; Referee: Michel Girard

14 October 1989 14	Mulhouse	1–0	Paris Saint-Germain	Mulhouse
	Peuget 3'	Report		Stadium: Stade de l'Ill; Attendance: 8,691; Referee: Philippe Leduc

21 October 1989 15	Paris Saint-Germain	0–1	Lyon	Paris
		Report	García 87' (pen.)	Stadium: Parc des Princes; Attendance: 8,249; Referee: Rémi Harrel

27 October 1989 16	Marseille	2–1	Paris Saint-Germain	Marseille
	Waddle 35'; Francescoli 87'	Report	Vujović 75'	Stadium: Stade Vélodrome; Attendance: 25,987; Referee: Michel Vautrot

4 November 1989 17	Paris Saint-Germain	1–1	Auxerre	Paris
	Charbonnier 80'	Report	Vahirua 3'	Stadium: Parc des Princes; Attendance: 13,050; Referee: Robert Wurtz

8 November 1989 18	Nantes	0–1	Paris Saint-Germain	Nantes
		Report	Vujović 46'	Stadium: Stade de la Beaujoire; Attendance: 8,917; Referee: Gérard Biguet

11 November 1989 19	Paris Saint-Germain	0–1	Toulouse	Paris
		Report	Debève 61'	Stadium: Parc des Princes; Attendance: 14,551; Referee: Jean-Louis Rideau

25 November 1989 20	Metz	0–1	Paris Saint-Germain	Metz
		Report	Charbonnier 78'	Stadium: Stade Saint-Symphorien; Attendance: 11,559; Referee: Michel De Zayas

2 December 1989 21	Paris Saint-Germain	1–0	Sochaux	Paris
	Laurey 14' (o.g.)	Report		Stadium: Parc des Princes; Attendance: 6,703; Referee: Jean-Marie Lartigot

10 December 1989 22	Montpellier	2–0	Paris Saint-Germain	Montpellier
	Guérin 20'; Cantona 83'	Report		Stadium: Stade de la Mosson; Attendance: 9,000; Referee: Jean-Claude Swirog

17 December 1989 23	Paris Saint-Germain	2–0	Saint-Étienne	Paris
	Bravo 2'; Primard 39' (o.g.)	Report		Stadium: Parc des Princes; Attendance: 28,152; Referee: Jean-Pierre Blouet

4 February 1990 24	Lille	2–0	Paris Saint-Germain	Lille
	Périlleux 26' (pen.); Vandenbergh 71'	Report		Stadium: Stade Grimonprez-Jooris; Attendance: 7,024; Referee: Philippe Leduc

11 February 1990 25	Paris Saint-Germain	3–1	Brest	Paris
	Calderón 20' (pen.); Bravo 42'; Sušić 68'	Report	Colleter 56'	Stadium: Parc des Princes; Attendance: 12,000; Referee: Germain Zagni

21 February 1990 26	Toulon	0–3	Paris Saint-Germain	Toulon
		Report	Sušić 57'; Vujović 68', 71'	Stadium: Stade Mayol; Attendance: 7,000; Referee: Michel De Zayas

25 February 1990 27	Paris Saint-Germain	1–2	Racing Paris	Paris
	Calderón 90' (pen.)	Report	Bouderbala 58', 83'	Stadium: Parc des Princes; Attendance: 17,847; Referee: Gérard Biguet

2 March 1990 28	Monaco	2–0	Paris Saint-Germain	Monaco
	Díaz 32'; Mège 78'	Report		Stadium: Stade Louis II; Attendance: 4,333; Referee: Michel Vautrot

17 March 1990 29	Paris Saint-Germain	5–1	Cannes	Paris
	Calderón 34'; Sušić 60'; Charbonnier 64', 70'; Bravo 76'	Report	Durix 18'	Stadium: Parc des Princes; Attendance: 8,899; Referee: Marcel Lainé

24 March 1990 30	Bordeaux	3–0	Paris Saint-Germain	Bordeaux
	Pardo 13'; Allofs 45'; Paille 65'	Report		Stadium: Stade Chaban-Delmas; Attendance: 24,253; Referee: Claude Bouillet

31 March 1990 31	Paris Saint-Germain	3–1	Caen	Paris
	Vujović 31', 49'; Bravo 51'	Report	Lebourgeois 84'	Stadium: Parc des Princes; Attendance: 13,016; Referee: Marc Batta

7 April 1990 32	Paris Saint-Germain	1–0	Mulhouse	Paris
	Simba 77'	Report		Stadium: Parc des Princes; Attendance: 9,141; Referee: Rémi Harrel

14 April 1990 33	Lyon	1–2	Paris Saint-Germain	Lyon
	Kabongo 49'	Report	Simba 65', 69'	Stadium: Stade de Gerland; Attendance: 17,618; Referee: Antoine de Pandis

21 April 1990 34	Paris Saint-Germain	2–1	Marseille	Paris
	Calderón 43' (pen.); Vujović 83'	Report 1 Report 2	Sauzée 17'	Stadium: Parc des Princes; Attendance: 40,025; Referee: Gérard Biguet

28 April 1990 35	Auxerre	2–0	Paris Saint-Germain	Auxerre
	Kovács 71'; Scifo 87' (pen.)	Report		Stadium: Stade de l'Abbé-Deschamps; Attendance: 11,500; Referee: Jean-Claude Swirog

5 May 1990 36	Paris Saint-Germain	2–2	Nantes	Paris
	Vujović 50'; Simba 60'	Report	Eydelie 14'; Henry 34'	Stadium: Parc des Princes; Attendance: 18,903; Referee: Philippe Leduc

12 May 1990 37	Toulouse	4–1	Paris Saint-Germain	Toulouse
	Bastère 14'; Sène 64' (o.g.); Passi 67' (pen.), 76'	Report	Vujović 33'	Stadium: Stadium de Toulouse; Attendance: 9,850; Referee: Michel Girard

19 May 1990 38	Paris Saint-Germain	2–1	Nice	Paris
	Simba 23', 43'	Report 1 Report 2	Mazzuchetti 47'	Stadium: Parc des Princes; Attendance: 10,541; Referee: Claude Bouillet

=== Coupe de France ===
17 February 1990 Round of 64	Valenciennes	1–0	Paris Saint-Germain	Lens
	Gohel 60'	Report 1 Report 2		Stadium: Stade Bollaert-Delelis; Attendance: 5,216; Referee: Antoine de Pandis

=== UEFA Europa League ===
==== First round ====
12 September 1989 First leg	Kuusysi (Finland)	0–0	(France) Paris Saint-Germain	Lahti, Finland
		Report		Stadium: Lahden kisapuisto Attendance: 3,882; Referee: Wieland Ziller (East Germany)

26 September 1989 Second leg	Paris Saint-Germain (France)	3–2 (3–2 agg.)	(Finland) Kuusysi	Paris, France
	Sušić 18'; Vujović 57'; Calderón 68' (pen.)	Report 1 Report 2	Remes 14'; Lius 90' (pen.)	Stadium: Parc des Princes; Attendance: 9,437; Referee: José Veiga Trigo (Portugal)

==== Second round ====
17 October 1989 First leg	Paris Saint-Germain (France)	0–1	(Italy) Juventus	Paris, France
		Report	Barros 66'	Stadium: Parc des Princes; Attendance: 30,699; Referee: John Blankenstein (Netherlands)

31 October 1989 Second leg	Juventus (Italy)	2–1 (3–1 agg.)	(France) Paris Saint-Germain	Turin, Italy
	Galia 26'; Bosser 83' (o.g.)	Report	Bravo 30'	Stadium: Stadio Olimpico Grande Torino; Attendance: 41,306; Referee: George Courtney (England)

== Statistics ==
=== Appearances and goals ===
20 players featured in at least one official match, and the club scored 54 goals in official competitions, including two own goals.

Rank	Player	Position	Appearances	Goals	Source
1	(France) Joël Bats	GK	43	0	
2	(Socialist Federal Republic of Yugoslavia) Safet Sušić	MF	41	8	
3	(France) Christian Perez	FW	38	1	
4	(Senegal) Oumar Sène	MF	38	1	
5	(Argentina) Gabriel Calderón	MF	37	10	
6	(France) Michel Bibard	DF	36	0	
7	(France) Daniel Bravo	MF	35	6	
8	(France) Jean-François Charbonnier	DF	35	6	
9	(Socialist Federal Republic of Yugoslavia) Zlatko Vujović	FW	34	11	
10	(France) Franck Tanasi	DF	34	0	
11	(France) Jean-Pierre Bosser	DF	33	0	
12	(France) Amara Simba	FW	29	6	
13	(France) Thierry Rabat	DF	24	1	
14	(Algeria) Lyazid Sandjak	FW	24	0	
15	(France) Philippe Jeannol	DF	18	1	
16	(France) Pierre Reynaud	MF	18	0	
17	(France) Yvon Le Roux	DF	15	1	
18	(France) Francis Llacer	DF	8	0	
19	(France) Pascal Nouma	FW	4	0	
20	(France) David Rinçon	FW	3	0	
