= 1988–89 Paris Saint-Germain FC season =

19th season of Paris Saint-Germain

Paris Saint-Germain
1988–89 season
- President: Francis Borelli
- Manager: Tomislav Ivić
- Stadium: Parc des Princes
- Ligue 1: 2nd
- Coupe de France: Round of 16
- Top goalscorer: League: Daniel Xuereb (15); All: Daniel Xuereb (17)
- Average home league attendance: 17,502
Home colours	Away colours	Third colours

The 1988–89 season was the 19th season in the history of Paris Saint-Germain FC. PSG played their home league matches at the Parc des Princes, attracting an average of 17,502 spectators per match. The club's president was Francis Borelli, and the team was managed by Tomislav Ivić, with Oumar Sène serving as captain. PSG finished second in Ligue 1 and reached the round of 16 in the Coupe de France. Daniel Xuereb was the team's top scorer, netting 17 goals in all competitions, including 15 in the league.

== Players ==
=== Squad ===
Players who featured in at least one official match for the club.

Note: Flags indicate national team as defined under FIFA eligibility rules; some limited exceptions apply. Players may hold more than one non-FIFA nationality.

No.	Pos.	Nation	Player
—	GK	FRA	Joël Bats
—	DF	FRA	Pierre Dréossi
—	DF	FRA	Michel Bibard
—	DF	FRA	Jean-Marc Pilorget
—	DF	FRA	Jean-François Charbonnier
—	DF	FRA	Philippe Jeannol
—	DF	FRA	Jocelyn Rico
—	DF	FRA	Franck Tanasi
—	MF	FRA	Pierre Reynaud
—	MF	FRA	Patrice Marquet

No.	Pos.	Nation	Player
—	MF	FRA	Alain Polaniok
—	MF	CMR	Fabrice Moreau
—	MF	SEN	Oumar Sène (captain)
—	MF	ARG	Gabriel Calderón
—	MF	YUG	Safet Sušić
—	FW	ALG	Liazid Sandjak
—	FW	FRA	Amara Simba
—	FW	FRA	Alain Couriol
—	FW	FRA	Daniel Xuereb
—	FW	FRA	Christian Perez

=== Out on loan ===
Players who were loaned out to other clubs during the season.

Note: Flags indicate national team as defined under FIFA eligibility rules; some limited exceptions apply. Players may hold more than one non-FIFA nationality.

No.	Pos.	Nation	Player
—	GK	FRA	Claude Barrabé (at Brest)
—	DF	FRA	Thierry Rabat (at Lens)
—	DF	FRA	Christian Zajaczkowski (at Lens)

No.	Pos.	Nation	Player
—	MF	FRA	Philippe Dehouck (at Annecy)
—	MF	FRA	Patrice Marquet (at Bastia)

== Transfers ==
=== Arrivals ===
Players who signed for the club.

Note: Flags indicate national team as defined under FIFA eligibility rules; some limited exceptions apply. Players may hold more than one non-FIFA nationality.

No.	Pos.	Nation	Player
—	DF	FRA	Pierre Dréossi (from Nice)
—	DF	FRA	Jean-Marc Pilorget (from Cannes, end of loan)
—	DF	FRA	Jocelyn Rico (from Nice)
—	MF	CMR	Fabrice Moreau (from La Roche, end of loan)

No.	Pos.	Nation	Player
—	MF	FRA	Alain Polaniok (from Cannes, end of loan)
—	FW	FRA	Christian Perez (from Montpellier)
—	FW	SEN	Jules Bocandé (from Nice, end of loan)

=== Departures ===
Players who left the club.

Note: Flags indicate national team as defined under FIFA eligibility rules; some limited exceptions apply. Players may hold more than one non-FIFA nationality.

No.	Pos.	Nation	Player
—	DF	FRA	Thierry Bacconnier (to Angers)
—	DF	FRA	Pierre Bianconi (to Bastia)
—	DF	FRA	Fabrice Poullain (to Monaco)
—	MF	FRA	Éric Martin (to Nancy)

No.	Pos.	Nation	Player
—	MF	FRA	Olivier Martinez (to Charleville)
—	FW	SEN	Jules Bocandé (to Nice)
—	FW	FRA	Bruno Roux (to Rouen)

== Kits ==
RTL and La Cinq were the shirt sponsors, and Adidas was the kit supplier.

Home	Away	Third

== Competitions ==
=== Overview ===
Competition	First match	Last match	Starting round	Final position	Record							
Competition	First match	Last match	Starting round	Final position	Pld	W	D	L	GF	GA	GD	Win %
Ligue 1	16 July 1988	31 May 1989	Matchday 1	2nd	38	19	13	6	45	26	+19	50.00
Coupe de France	25 February 1989	15 April 1989	Round of 64	Round of 16	5	3	1	1	12	8	+4	60.00
Total					43	22	14	7	57	34	+23	51.16

Source: Competitions

=== Ligue 1 ===
==== League table ====
Pos	Team	Pld	W	D	L	GF	GA	GD	Pts	Qualification or relegation
1	Marseille (C)	38	20	13	5	56	35	+21	73	Qualification to European Cup first round
2	Paris Saint-Germain	38	19	13	6	45	26	+19	70	Qualification to UEFA Cup first round
3	Monaco	38	18	14	6	62	38	+24	68	Qualification to Cup Winners' Cup first round (Note: Monaco qualified for 1989–90 European Cup Winners' Cup as runners-up of the 1988–89 Coupe de France as cup winners Marseille also won the league and qualified for the European Cup.)
4	Sochaux	38	19	11	8	50	28	+22	68	Qualification to UEFA Cup first round
5	Auxerre	38	18	9	11	41	32	+9	63	Qualification to UEFA Cup preliminary round

Source: Histoire du PSG
Rules for classification: 1) points; 2) goal difference; 3) number of goals scored.
Victory: 3 points, Draw: 1 point, Defeat: 0 points
(C) Champions

==== Results by round ====
Round	1	2	3	4	5	6	7	8	9	10	11	12	13	14	15	16	17	18	19	20	21	22	23	24	25	26	27	28	29	30	31	32	33	34	35	36	37	38
Ground	A	H	A	H	A	H	H	A	H	A	H	A	H	A	H	A	H	A	H	A	H	A	H	A	A	H	A	H	A	H	A	H	A	H	A	H	A	H
Result	W	D	W	W	L	W	W	W	D	L	W	D	W	L	W	W	D	W	W	W	W	D	L	W	L	D	D	D	D	W	D	W	D	W	L	W	D	D
Position	8	9	4	3	5	3	1	1	1	2	2	1	1	2	2	1	1	1	1	1	1	1	2	1	1	1	2	2	2	1	1	1	2	1	2	2	2	2

Source: Histoire du PSG
A = Away; H = Home; W = Win; D = Draw; L = Loss

==== Matches ====
16 July 1988 1	Metz	0–1	Paris Saint-Germain	Metz
		Report	Sušić 15'	Stadium: Stade Saint-Symphorien; Attendance: 13,084; Referee: Jean-Claude Swirog

27 July 1988 3	Cannes	0–3	Paris Saint-Germain	Cannes
		Report	Sušić 57'; Calderón 75'; Xuereb 76'	Stadium: Stade Pierre de Coubertin; Attendance: 8,462; Referee: Gérard Biguet

30 July 1988 4	Paris Saint-Germain	1–0	Nantes	Paris
	Xuereb 43'	Report		Stadium: Parc des Princes; Attendance: 21,981; Referee: Antoine de Pandis

6 August 1988 5	Monaco	1–0	Paris Saint-Germain	Monaco
	Amoros 88'	Report		Stadium: Stade Louis II; Attendance: 12,587; Referee: Alain Delmer

13 August 1988 6	Paris Saint-Germain	3–0	Caen	Paris
	Xuereb 3', 71'; Sandjak 72'	Report		Stadium: Parc des Princes; Attendance: 9,398; Referee: Jean-Claude Bourgeois

17 August 1988 7	Paris Saint-Germain	1–0	Sochaux	Paris
	Laurey 23' (o.g.)	Report		Stadium: Parc des Princes; Attendance: 31,658; Referee: Jean-Pierre Blouet

20 August 1988 8	Toulon	0–1	Paris Saint-Germain	Toulon
		Report	Xuereb 40'	Stadium: Stade Mayol; Attendance: 13,788; Referee: Michel Girard

27 August 1988 9	Paris Saint-Germain	2–2	Auxerre	Paris
	Sušić 8'; Xuereb 40'	Report	Mlinarić 6', 33'	Stadium: Parc des Princes; Attendance: 28,081; Referee: Rémi Harrel

3 September 1988 10	Lille	2–1	Paris Saint-Germain	Lille
	Desmet 33' (pen.); Mobati 75' (pen.)	Report	Charbonnier 83'	Stadium: Stade Grimonprez-Jooris; Attendance: 9,163; Referee: Rémy Féménia

10 September 1988 11	Paris Saint-Germain	2–1	Toulouse	Paris
	Sušić 7'; Calderón 42'	Report	Pavon 20'	Stadium: Parc des Princes; Attendance: 15,124; Referee: Jean-Marie Sculfort

14 September 1988 2	Paris Saint-Germain	1–1	Bordeaux	Paris
	Perez 9'	Report	Dewilder 52'	Stadium: Parc des Princes; Attendance: 38,485; Referee: Robert Wurtz

17 September 1988 12	Montpellier	0–0	Paris Saint-Germain	Montpellier
		Report		Stadium: Stade de la Mosson; Attendance: 14,200; Referee: Jean-Claude Swirog

21 September 1988 13	Paris Saint-Germain	3–1	Saint-Étienne	Paris
	Pilorget 3'; Xuereb 38', 41'	Report	Chaouch 90'	Stadium: Parc des Princes; Attendance: 19,028; Referee: Michel Vautrot

1 October 1988 14	Nice	3–1	Paris Saint-Germain	Nice
	Rohr 18'; Bravo 45'; N'Dioro 88'	Report	Pilorget 51'	Stadium: Stade du Ray; Attendance: 14,423; Referee: Michel De Zayas

8 October 1988 15	Paris Saint-Germain	1–0	Strasbourg	Paris
	Calderón 43' (pen.)	Report		Stadium: Parc des Princes; Attendance: 9,848; Referee: Philippe Leduc

14 October 1988 16	Racing Paris	0–2	Paris Saint-Germain	Paris
		Report 1 Report 2	Xuereb 7'; Perez 81'	Stadium: Parc des Princes; Attendance: 24,208; Referee: Gérard Biguet

29 October 1988 17	Paris Saint-Germain	0–0	Marseille	Paris
		Report		Stadium: Parc des Princes; Attendance: 33,256; Referee: Claude Bouillet

5 November 1988 18	Laval	1–2	Paris Saint-Germain	Laval
	Tanasi 61' (o.g.)	Report	Perez 26'; Sušić 34'	Stadium: Stade Francis Le Basser; Attendance: 6,517; Referee: Jean-Marie Lartigot

12 November 1988 19	Paris Saint-Germain	3–2	Lens	Paris
	Xuereb 15'; Perez 38', 72'	Report	Oudjani 21'; Tobollik 68'	Stadium: Parc des Princes; Attendance: 13,665; Referee: Jean-Claude Hirtz

26 November 1988 20	Bordeaux	0–1	Paris Saint-Germain	Bordeaux
		Report	Perez 35'	Stadium: Stade Chaban-Delmas; Attendance: 19,853; Referee: Alain Delmer

3 December 1988 21	Paris Saint-Germain	1–0	Cannes	Paris
	Perez 37'	Report		Stadium: Parc des Princes; Attendance: 10,945; Referee: Jean-Claude Swirog

10 December 1988 22	Nantes	1–1	Paris Saint-Germain	Nantes
	Vercauteren 13'	Report	Xuereb 45'	Stadium: Stade de la Beaujoire; Attendance: 20,000; Referee: Michel De Zayas

14 December 1988 23	Paris Saint-Germain	0–2	Monaco	Paris
		Report	Hateley 36' (pen.); Fofana 41'	Stadium: Parc des Princes; Attendance: 19,940; Referee: Michel Girard

17 December 1988 24	Caen	0–1	Paris Saint-Germain	Caen
		Report	Calderón 42'	Stadium: Stade de Venoix; Attendance: 12,962; Referee: Gérard Biguet

5 February 1989 25	Sochaux	2–1	Paris Saint-Germain	Montbéliard
	Lada 16'; Baždarević 50'	Report	Sušić 34'	Stadium: Stade Auguste-Bonal; Attendance: 8,500; Referee: Robert Wurtz

11 February 1989 26	Paris Saint-Germain	0–0	Toulon	Paris
		Report		Stadium: Parc des Princes; Attendance: 11,345; Referee: Jean-Pierre Blouet

18 February 1989 27	Auxerre	0–0	Paris Saint-Germain	Auxerre
		Report		Stadium: Stade de l'Abbé-Deschamps; Attendance: 16,000; Referee: Claude Bouillet

22 February 1989 28	Paris Saint-Germain	1–1	Lille	Paris
	Calderón 44' (pen.)	Report	Mobati 67'	Stadium: Parc des Princes; Attendance: 10,702; Referee: Jean-Claude Bourgeois

11 March 1989 29	Toulouse	0–0	Paris Saint-Germain	Toulouse
		Report		Stadium: Stadium de Toulouse; Attendance: 13,794; Referee: Michel Vautrot

14 March 1989 30	Paris Saint-Germain	3–2	Montpellier	Paris
	Xuereb 20', 46'; Sène 63'	Report	Milla 61', 75'	Stadium: Parc des Princes; Attendance: 10,620; Referee: Gérard Biguet

25 March 1989 31	Saint-Étienne	0–0	Paris Saint-Germain	Saint-Étienne
		Report		Stadium: Stade Geoffroy-Guichard; Attendance: 27,602; Referee: Philippe Leduc

1 April 1989 32	Paris Saint-Germain	1–0	Nice	Paris
	Xuereb 63'	Report		Stadium: Parc des Princes; Attendance: 15,415; Referee: Claude Bouillet

12 April 1989 33	Strasbourg	0–0	Paris Saint-Germain	Strasbourg
		Report		Stadium: Stade de la Meinau; Attendance: 25,000; Referee: Jean-Claude Swirog

22 April 1989 34	Paris Saint-Germain	2–1	Racing Paris	Paris
	Xuereb 22'; Bossis 46' (o.g.)	Report	Lima 89'	Stadium: Parc des Princes; Attendance: 15,784; Referee: Robert Wurtz

5 May 1989 35	Marseille	1–0	Paris Saint-Germain	Marseille
	Sauzée 90'	Report		Stadium: Stade Vélodrome; Attendance: 32,572; Referee: Michel Vautrot

12 May 1989 36	Paris Saint-Germain	3–0	Laval	Paris
	Calderón 5'; Sušić 61'; Simba 85'	Report		Stadium: Parc des Princes; Attendance: 8,468; Referee: Alain Delmer

20 May 1989 37	Lens	0–0	Paris Saint-Germain	Lens
		Report		Stadium: Stade Bollaert-Delelis; Attendance: 10,000; Referee: Jean-Louis Rideau

31 May 1989 38	Paris Saint-Germain	2–2	Metz	Paris
	Polaniok 20'; Calderón 59' (pen.)	Report	Black 41'; Rio 70'	Stadium: Parc des Princes; Attendance: 8,793; Referee: Rémy Féménia

=== Coupe de France ===
==== Round of 64 ====
25 February 1989 Single leg	INF Clairefontaine	0–3	Paris Saint-Germain	Meaux
		Report	Jeannol 47'; Calderón 82'; Sušić 89'	Stadium: Stade Alberto-Corazza; Attendance: 1,630; Referee: Jean-Marie Sculfort

==== Round of 32 ====
22 March 1989 First leg	Montluçon	0–1	Paris Saint-Germain	Montluçon
		Report	Perez 68' (pen.)	Stadium: Stade Dunlop; Attendance: 11,000; Referee: Rémi Harrel

29 March 1989 Second leg	Paris Saint-Germain	5–1 (6–1 agg.)	Montluçon	Paris
	Perez 17', 20'; Sušić 35'; Xuereb 69', 86'	Report	Ibanez 16'	Stadium: Parc des Princes; Attendance: 4,403; Referee: André Féret

==== Round of 16 ====
8 April 1989 First leg	Paris Saint-Germain	0–4	Orléans	Paris
		Report	Langers 39'; Germain 59'; Soyer 73'; Lerat 89'	Stadium: Parc des Princes; Attendance: 9,723; Referee: Jean-Pierre Blouet

15 April 1989 Second leg	Orléans	3–3 (7–3 agg.)	Paris Saint-Germain	Orléans
	Langers 60'; Bacconnier 76'; Lerat 88'	Report	Simba 44'; Jeannol 79'; Calderón 89' (pen.)	Stadium: Stade de la Source; Attendance: 11,839; Referee: Jean-Marie Lartigot

== Statistics ==
=== Appearances and goals ===
20 players featured in at least one official match, and the club scored 57 goals in official competitions, including two own goals.

Rank	Player	Position	Appearances	Goals	Source
1	(France) Daniel Xuereb	FW	43	17	
2	(France) Joël Bats	GK	43	0	
3	(Argentina) Gabriel Calderón	MF	42	9	
4	(France) Christian Perez	FW	40	10	
5	(Senegal) Oumar Sène	MF	40	1	
6	(France) Jean-Marc Pilorget	DF	39	2	
7	(France) Alain Polaniok	MF	38	0	
8	(Socialist Federal Republic of Yugoslavia) Safet Sušić	MF	37	9	
9	(France) Franck Tanasi	DF	36	0	
10	(France) Michel Bibard	DF	35	0	
11	(France) Jean-François Charbonnier	DF	33	1	
12	(France) Philippe Jeannol	DF	31	2	
13	(France) Jocelyn Rico	DF	25	0	
14	(France) Pierre Dréossi	DF	21	0	
15	(France) Amara Simba	FW	9	2	
16	(Algeria) Lyazid Sandjak	FW	8	1	
17	(France) Alain Couriol	FW	1	0	
18	(France) Patrice Marquet	MF	1	0	
19	(Cameroon) Fabrice Moreau	MF	1	0	
20	(France) Pierre Reynaud	MF	1	0	
