= 1991–92 Paris Saint-Germain FC season =

22nd season in existence of Paris Saint-Germain

Paris Saint-Germain
1991–92 season
- President: Michel Denisot
- Manager: Artur Jorge
- Stadium: Parc des Princes
- Ligue 1: 3rd
- Coupe de France: Round of 32
- Top goalscorer: League: Christian Perez (12); All: Christian Perez (13)
- Average home league attendance: 26,542
Home colours	Away colours

The 1991–92 season was the 22nd season in the history of Paris Saint-Germain FC. PSG played their home league matches at the Parc des Princes, attracting an average of 26,542 spectators per match. The club's president was Michel Denisot, and the team was managed by Artur Jorge, with Paul Le Guen serving as captain. PSG finished third in Ligue 1 and reached the round of 32 in the Coupe de France. Christian Perez was the team's top scorer, netting 13 goals in all competitions, including 12 in the league.

== Players ==
=== Squad ===
Players who featured in at least one official match for the club.

Note: Flags indicate national team as defined under FIFA eligibility rules; some limited exceptions apply. Players may hold more than one non-FIFA nationality.

No.	Pos.	Nation	Player
—	GK	FRA	Joël Bats
—	GK	FRA	Richard Dutruel
—	DF	FRA	Patrick Colleter
—	DF	BRA	Geraldão
—	DF	FRA	Jean-Luc Vasseur
—	DF	FRA	Bruno Germain
—	DF	FRA	Bernard Héréson
—	DF	BRA	Ricardo
—	DF	FRA	Francis Llacer
—	DF	FRA	Antoine Kombouaré
—	DF	FRA	Laurent Fournier
—	DF	FRA	Paul Le Guen (captain)

No.	Pos.	Nation	Player
—	MF	FRA	Pierre Reynaud
—	MF	FRA	Daniel Bravo
—	MF	SEN	Oumar Sène
—	MF	FRA	Bernard Pardo
—	MF	BRA	Valdo
—	FW	ALG	Lyazid Sandjak
—	FW	FRA	Pascal Nouma
—	FW	FRA	David Rinçon
—	FW	FRA	Amara Simba
—	FW	FRA	Christian Perez
—	FW	FRA	David Ginola

== Transfers ==
=== Arrivals ===
Players who signed for the club.

Note: Flags indicate national team as defined under FIFA eligibility rules; some limited exceptions apply. Players may hold more than one non-FIFA nationality.

No.	Pos.	Nation	Player
—	GK	FRA	Richard Dutruel (from PSG Youth Academy)
—	GK	FRA	Thomas Kokkinis (from Bastia, end of loan)
—	DF	FRA	Patrick Colleter (from Montpellier)
—	DF	BRA	Geraldão (from Porto)
—	DF	FRA	Bruno Germain (from Marseille)
—	DF	FRA	Bernard Héréson (from Laval)
—	DF	BRA	Ricardo (from Benfica)

No.	Pos.	Nation	Player
—	DF	FRA	Laurent Fournier (from Marseille)
—	DF	FRA	Paul Le Guen (from Nantes)
—	MF	FRA	Thierry Laurey (from Saint-Étienne, end of loan)
—	MF	FRA	Bernard Pardo (from Marseille)
—	MF	BRA	Valdo (from Benfica)
—	FW	FRA	Amara Simba (from Cannes, end of loan)
—	FW	FRA	David Ginola (from Brest)

=== Departures ===
Players who left the club.

Note: Flags indicate national team as defined under FIFA eligibility rules; some limited exceptions apply. Players may hold more than one non-FIFA nationality.

No.	Pos.	Nation	Player
—	GK	FRA	Thomas Kokkinis (to Red Star)
—	DF	FRA	Jocelyn Angloma (to Marseille)
—	DF	FRA	Michel Bibard (to Sur)
—	DF	FRA	Jean-Pierre Bosser (to Mulhouse)
—	DF	FRA	Jean-François Charbonnier (to Paris FC)
—	DF	FRA	Philippe Jeannol (Retired)
—	DF	FRA	Stéphane Persol (to Corbeil-Essonnes)

No.	Pos.	Nation	Player
—	DF	FRA	Franck Tanasi (to Poissy)
—	MF	FRA	Thierry Laurey (to Montpellier)
—	MF	YUG	Safet Sušić (to Red Star)
—	FW	SEN	Alboury Lah (to Châteauroux)
—	FW	YUG	Zlatko Vujović (to Sochaux)
—	FW	FRA	Franck Vandecasteele (to Laval)

== Kits ==
Commodore and Müller were the shirt sponsors, and Nike was the kit supplier.

Home 1	Home 2	Away

== Competitions ==
=== Overview ===
Competition	First match	Last match	Starting round	Final position	Record							
Competition	First match	Last match	Starting round	Final position	Pld	W	D	L	GF	GA	GD	Win %
Ligue 1	20 July 1991	1 May 1992	Matchday 1	3rd	38	15	17	6	43	27	+16	39.47
Coupe de France	22 February 1992	14 March 1992	Round of 64	Round of 32	2	1	0	1	6	4	+2	50.00
Total					40	16	17	7	49	31	+18	40.00

Source: Competitions

=== Ligue 1 ===
==== League table ====
Pos	Team	Pld	W	D	L	GF	GA	GD	Pts	Qualification or relegation
1	Marseille (C)	38	23	12	3	67	21	+46	58	Qualification to Champions League first round
2	Monaco	38	22	8	8	55	33	+22	52	Qualification to Cup Winners' Cup first round (Note: Monaco qualified for the 1992–93 European Cup Winners' Cup as finalists of the 1991–92 Coupe de France.)
3	Paris Saint-Germain	38	15	17	6	43	27	+16	47	Qualification to UEFA Cup first round
4	Auxerre	38	16	12	10	55	32	+23	44	Qualification to UEFA Cup first round
5	Caen	38	17	10	11	45	44	+1	44	Qualification to UEFA Cup first round

Rules for classification: 1) points; 2) goal difference; 3) number of goals scored.
Victory: 2 points, Draw: 1 point, Defeat: 0 points
(C) Champions
Notes:

Promoted from Ligue 2, who will play in Division 1 season 1992/1993

- Bordeaux: Champion of Division 2, winner of Division 2 group B
- Valenciennes FC: Runner-up, winner of Division 2 group A
- RC Strasbourg: Third place, winner of barrages against Stade Rennais

==== Results by round ====
Round	1	2	3	4	5	6	7	8	9	10	11	12	13	14	15	16	17	18	19	20	21	22	23	24	25	26	27	28	29	30	31	32	33	34	35	36	37	38
Ground	A	H	A	H	A	H	A	H	A	H	H	A	H	A	H	A	H	A	H	A	H	A	H	A	H	A	H	A	A	H	A	H	A	H	A	H	A	H
Result	D	D	D	D	D	W	D	W	W	W	W	D	L	L	W	W	D	L	W	D	D	D	D	L	W	D	W	D	D	W	W	W	W	W	L	D	L	D
Position	10	12	11	11	11	6	7	5	4	3	3	3	3	3	3	3	3	4	4	4	4	3	3	4	4	6	3	4	4	3	3	3	3	3	3	3	3	3

Source: Histoire du PSG
A = Away; H = Home; W = Win; D = Draw; L = Loss

==== Matches ====
20 July 1991 1	Nantes	0–0	Paris Saint-Germain	Nantes
		Report		Stadium: Stade de la Beaujoire; Attendance: 10,000; Referee: Didier Pauchard

27 July 1991 2	Paris Saint-Germain	1–1	Auxerre	Paris
	Bravo 50'	Report	Ferreri 25'	Stadium: Parc des Princes; Attendance: 32,580; Referee: Marc Batta

31 July 1991 3	Montpellier	1–1	Paris Saint-Germain	Montpellier
	Perez 11'	Report	Divert 67'	Stadium: Stade de la Mosson; Attendance: 15,000; Referee: Jean-Pierre Blouet

3 August 1991 4	Paris Saint-Germain	1–1	Le Havre	Paris
	Fournier 39'	Report	Tiéhi 88'	Stadium: Parc des Princes; Attendance: 23,848; Referee: Michel Girard

9 August 1991 5	Marseille	0–0	Paris Saint-Germain	Marseille
		Report 2		Stadium: Stade Vélodrome; Attendance: 37,933; Referee: Claude Bouillet

17 August 1991 6	Paris Saint-Germain	2–0	Monaco	Paris
	Perez 33'; Simba 72'	Report		Stadium: Parc des Princes; Attendance: 40,780; Referee: Marcel Lainé

24 August 1991 7	Cannes	1–1	Paris Saint-Germain	Cannes
	Zidane 54'	Report	Ricardo 62'	Stadium: Stade Pierre de Coubertin; Attendance: 17,000; Referee: Georges Ramos

28 August 1991 8	Paris Saint-Germain	1–0	Nancy	Paris
	Fournier 80'	Report		Stadium: Parc des Princes; Attendance: 20,000; Referee: Germain Zagni

7 September 1991 9	Lyon	0–1	Paris Saint-Germain	Lyon
		Report	Bravo 88'	Stadium: Stade de Gerland; Attendance: 20,766; Referee: Gérard Biguet

13 September 1991 10	Paris Saint-Germain	2–0	Lille	Paris
	Bravo 41'; Perez 89'			Stadium: Parc des Princes; Attendance: 18,002; Referee: Didier Pauchard

21 September 1991 11	Paris Saint-Germain	3–0	Metz	Paris
	Kombouaré 27'; Bravo 31'; Perez 53'	Report		Stadium: Parc des Princes; Attendance: 33,494; Referee: Jean-Claude Puyalt

28 September 1991 12	Rennes	0–0	Paris Saint-Germain	Rennes
		Report		Stadium: Roazhon Park; Attendance: 9,605; Referee: Antoine de Pandis

5 October 1991 13	Paris Saint-Germain	2–3	Toulon	Paris
	Bravo 28'; Perez 70'	Report	Revelles 64'; Blanc 86'; Rodríguez 88'	Stadium: Parc des Princes; Attendance: 25,926; Referee: Jean-Pierre Blouet

19 October 1991 14	Caen	2–0	Paris Saint-Germain	Caen
	Pickeu 70'; Gravelaine 75'	Report		Stadium: Stade de Venoix; Attendance: 9,678; Referee: Philippe Leduc

26 October 1991 15	Paris Saint-Germain	2–0	Nîmes	Paris
	Simba 48', 74'	Report		Stadium: Parc des Princes; Attendance: 26,408; Referee: Gilles Veissière

2 November 1991 16	Sochaux	0–2	Paris Saint-Germain	Montbéliard
			Valdo 64'; Le Guen 71'	Stadium: Stade Auguste-Bonal; Attendance: 4,447; Referee: Alain Delmer

9 November 1991 17	Paris Saint-Germain	0–0	Toulouse	Paris
		Report 1 Report 2		Stadium: Parc des Princes; Attendance: 22,366; Referee: Didier Pauchard

16 November 1991 18	Saint-Étienne	3–0	Paris Saint-Germain	Saint-Étienne
	Moravčík 36'; Kastendeuch 53' (pen.); Tholot 89'	Report		Stadium: Stade Geoffroy-Guichard; Attendance: 13,360; Referee: Rémy Harrel

23 November 1991 19	Paris Saint-Germain	1–0	Lens	Paris
	Perez 65'	Report		Stadium: Parc des Princes; Attendance: 25,696; Referee: Jean-Marie Lartigot

30 November 1991 20	Auxerre	2–2	Paris Saint-Germain	Auxerre
	Dutuel 47'; Baticle 78'	Report	Valdo 37'; Geraldão 85'	Stadium: Stade de l'Abbé-Deschamps; Attendance: 10,000; Referee: Patrick Anton

7 December 1991 21	Paris Saint-Germain	1–1	Montpellier	Paris
	Fournier 10'	Report	Laurey 33'	Stadium: Parc des Princes; Attendance: 19,391; Referee: Antoine de Pandis

14 December 1991 22	Le Havre	1–1	Paris Saint-Germain	Le Havre
	Mahut 45'	Report	Perez 12'	Stadium: Stade Jules Deschaseaux; Attendance: 9,594; Referee: Gilles Veissière

17 December 1991 23	Paris Saint-Germain	0–0	Marseille	Paris
		Report 2		Stadium: Parc des Princes; Attendance: 43,382; Referee: Alain Delmer

21 December 1991 24	Monaco	1–0	Paris Saint-Germain	Monaco
	Gnako 9'	Report		Stadium: Stade Louis II; Attendance: 6,500; Referee: Gérard Biguet

18 January 1992 25	Paris Saint-Germain	3–2	Cannes	Paris
	Perez 15'; Simba 19'; Kombouaré 80'	Report	Ricardo 16' (o.g.); Zidane 64'	Stadium: Parc des Princes; Attendance: 20,000; Referee: Germain Zagni

25 January 1992 26	Nancy	0–0	Paris Saint-Germain	Tomblaine
				Stadium: Stade Marcel Picot; Attendance: 6,716; Referee: Jean-Claude Puyalt

1 February 1992 27	Paris Saint-Germain	3–0	Lyon	Paris
	Reynaud 14'; Simba 28'; Perez 76'	Report 1 Report 2		Stadium: Parc des Princes; Attendance: 18,582; Referee: Rémy Harrel

8 February 1992 28	Lille	0–0	Paris Saint-Germain	Lille
		Report		Stadium: Stade Grimonprez-Jooris; Attendance: 8,000; Referee: Jean-Marie Lartigot

16 February 1992 29	Metz	0–0	Paris Saint-Germain	Metz
				Stadium: Stade Saint-Symphorien; Attendance: 7,983; Referee: Patrick Anton

29 February 1992 30	Paris Saint-Germain	1–0	Rennes	Paris
	Germain 11'	Report		Stadium: Parc des Princes; Attendance: 23,269; Referee: Gérard Biguet

6 March 1992 31	Toulon	2–5	Paris Saint-Germain	Toulon
	Rodríguez 53'; Pineda 83'	Report	Ginola 8'; Perez 17'; Simba 54'; Valdo 62'; Germain 77'	Stadium: Stade de Bon Rencontre; Attendance: 5,000; Referee: Michel Girard

19 March 1992 32	Paris Saint-Germain	3–1	Caen	Paris
	Ricardo 24' (pen.); Ginola 67', 90' (pen.)	Report 1 Report 2	Dumas 68'	Stadium: Parc des Princes; Attendance: 27,502; Referee: Rémy Harrel

28 March 1992 33	Nîmes	0–1	Paris Saint-Germain	Nîmes
		Report	Perez 48'	Stadium: Stade des Costières; Attendance: 13,892; Referee: Didier Pauchard

4 April 1992 34	Paris Saint-Germain	2–0	Sochaux	Paris
	Le Guen 22'; Perez 65'	Report		Stadium: Parc des Princes; Attendance: 22,431; Referee: Gilles Veissière

10 April 1992 35	Toulouse	3–0	Paris Saint-Germain	Toulouse
	Bancarel 44'; Ferrer 53'; Pavon 60'	Report		Stadium: Stadium de Toulouse; Attendance: 6,026; Referee: Michel Girard

18 April 1992 36	Paris Saint-Germain	0–0	Saint-Étienne	Paris
		Report		Stadium: Parc des Princes; Attendance: 34,479; Referee: Philippe Leduc

25 April 1992 37	Lens	1–0	Paris Saint-Germain	Lens
	Arsène 87'	Report		Stadium: Stade Bollaert-Delelis; Attendance: 24,256; Referee: Marc Batta

1 May 1992 38	Paris Saint-Germain	1–1	Nantes	Paris
	Bravo 31'		Burruchaga 60'	Stadium: Parc des Princes; Attendance: 27,485; Referee: Gilles Veissière

=== Coupe de France ===
22 February 1992 Round of 64	Boulogne	1–4	Paris Saint-Germain	Boulogne-sur-Mer
20:00	Gury 4' (pen.)	Report	Fournier 14'; Ginola 44'; Perez 47'; Simba 78'	Stadium: Stade de la Libération; Attendance: 11,500; Referee: Alain Sars

14 March 1992 Round of 32	Nancy	3–2	Paris Saint-Germain	Tomblaine
20:00	Zavarov 38'; Séchet 77'; Zitelli 80' (pen.)	Report	Germain 21'; Ricardo 79'	Stadium: Stade Marcel Picot; Attendance: 6,474; Referee: Jean-Marie Lartigot

== Statistics ==
=== Appearances and goals ===
23 players featured in at least one official match, and the club scored 49 goals in official competitions, including two own goals.

Rank	Player	Position	Appearances	Goals	Source
1	(France) Christian Perez	FW	39	13	
2	(Brazil) Ricardo	DF	39	3	
3	(France) Daniel Bravo	MF	38	6	
4	(France) Paul Le Guen	DF	38	2	
5	(France) Bruno Germain	DF	36	3	
6	(France) Joël Bats	GK	36	0	
7	(France) Laurent Fournier	DF	35	4	
8	(Brazil) Valdo	MF	34	3	
9	(France) Antoine Kombouaré	DF	33	2	
10	(Brazil) Geraldão	DF	29	1	
11	(France) Patrick Colleter	DF	29	0	
12	(France) Amara Simba	FW	27	7	
13	(France) Pierre Reynaud	MF	22	1	
14	(France) David Ginola	FW	17	4	
15	(Senegal) Oumar Sène	MF	11	0	
16	(France) Francis Llacer	DF	9	0	
17	(France) Bernard Héréson	DF	8	0	
18	(France) Bernard Pardo	MF	6	0	
19	(France) Pascal Nouma	FW	5	0	
20	(France) Richard Dutruel	GK	4	0	
21	(Algeria) Lyazid Sandjak	FW	3	0	
22	(France) David Rinçon	FW	1	0	
23	(France) Jean-Luc Vasseur	DF	1	0	
