= 1988 Coupe de France final =

- Event: 1987–88 Coupe de France
Metz	Sochaux
1	1
- After extra time Metz won 5–4 on penalties
- Date: 11 June 1988
- Venue: Parc des Princes, Paris
- Referee: Claude Bouillet
- Attendance: 44,531

The 1988 Coupe de France final was a football match held at Parc des Princes, Paris on 11 June 1988, that saw FC Metz defeat FC Sochaux-Montbéliard in a penalty shoot out. After normal time and extra-time could not separate the two sides, the match was to be decided on penalty kicks. Mickaël Madar from FC Sochaux-Montbéliard was the only one to miss his penalty.

== Match details ==
11 June 1988
20:30

Metz	1–1 (a.e.t.)	Sochaux
Black 45'		Paille 36'
Penalties
Zénier (penalty scored); Hinschberger (penalty scored); Zanon (penalty scored); Bracconi (penalty scored); Kastendeuch (penalty scored)	5–4	(penalty scored) Hadžibegić; (penalty scored) Sauzée; (penalty scored) Paille; (penalty scored) Rousset; (penalty missed) Madar

Parc des Princes, Paris
Attendance: 44,531
Referee: Claude Bouillet

GK	(France) Michel Ettore
DF	(France) Philippe Gaillot
DF	(France) Frédéric Pons
DF	(France) Albert Cartier	(substituted off) 77'
DF	(France) Sylvain Kastendeuch
MF	(France) Thierry Pauk	(substituted off) 106'
MF	(France) Carmelo Micciche
MF	(France) Jean-Louis Zanon
MF	(Scotland) Eric Black
FW	(France) Philippe Hinschberger (c)
FW	(France) Bernard Zénier
Substitutes:
DF	(France) Carlos Lopez	(substituted on) 77'
FW	(France) Christian Bracconi	(substituted on) 106'
Manager:
(France) Marcel Husson Assistant Referees: Fourth Official:

GK	(France) Gilles Rousset
DF	(France) Laurent Croci
DF	(France) Fabrice Peltier
DF	(France) Franck Silvestre
DF	(Socialist Federal Republic of Yugoslavia) Faruk Hadžibegić
MF	(France) Jean-Christophe Thomas	(substituted off) 97'
MF	(France) Fabrice Henry
MF	(France) Franck Sauzée
MF	(France) Philippe Morin	(substituted off) 65'
MF	(Socialist Federal Republic of Yugoslavia) Mehmed Baždarević
FW	(France) Stéphane Paille (c)
Substitutes:
FW	(France) Mickaël Madar	(substituted on) 65'
?	(France) Jacques Colin	(substituted on) 97'
Manager:
(Socialist Federal Republic of Yugoslavia) Silvester Takač

== See also ==
- Coupe de France 1987-88
