= Jean-Pierre Bosser =

Jean-Pierre Bosser may refer:

- Jean-Pierre Bosser (born 1959), French army general
- Jean-Pierre Bosser (born 1960), French former footballer
