= Pierre Bianconi =

French footballer

Personal information
- Full name: Pierre Bianconi
- Date of birth: 16 November 1962 last seen 29 December 1993 (aged 31)
- Place of birth: Bastia, France, where he disappeared
- Height: 1.70 m (5 ft 7 in)
- Position: Defender

Youth career
- –1979: ÉF Bastia
- 1979–1982: INF Vichy

Senior career*
Years	Team	Apps	(Gls)
1982–1983	Bastia	12	(0)
1983–1984	RCFC Besançon	27	(0)
1984–1985	Cannes	17	(0)
1985–1986	Nîmes	16	(0)
1986–1987	Bastia	10	(2)
1987–1988	Paris Saint-Germain	6	(0)
1988–1993	Bastia	78	(3)
Total		166	(5)

International career
1989–1993	Corsica	3	(0)
- * Club domestic league appearances and goals

Pierre Bianconi
- Born: 16 November 1962; France
- Disappeared: 29 December 1993 (aged 31); Bastia, France
- Status: Missing for 32 years, 10 months and 1 day

Pierre "Pierrot" Bianconi (born 16 November 1962 – disappeared 29 December 1993) is a French former professional footballer who played as a defender.

== Club career ==
Bianconi played for Bastia, RCFC Besançon, Cannes, Nîmes, and Paris Saint-Germain over the course of 11 years, making over 175 career appearances and scoring 5 goals.

As a very aggressive player, Bianconi received numerous yellow and red cards during his career. In a friendly between Nîmes and Toulouse in 1985, he slapped Alberto Márcico. The referee brandished his red card, but Bianconi thought otherwise, and decided to rip apart the card and headbutt the referee, who was left with a bloody nose. Bianconi was given a six-month ban in all competitions, and never played for Nîmes again.

== International career ==
On 2 September 1989, Bianconi made his debut for the Corsica national team in a 4–3 victory over Toulon.

== Disappearance ==
Bianconi mysteriously disappeared on 29 December 1993, at the age of 31. His car was found in the port of Bastia, but without any trace of its owner.

== Career statistics ==
Appearances and goals by club, season and competition
Club	Season	League			Cup		Total	
Club	Season	Division	Apps	Goals	Apps	Goals	Apps	Goals
Bastia	1982–83	Division 1	12	0	0	0	12	0
RCFC Besançon	1983–84	Division 2	27	0	3	0	30	0
Cannes	1984–85	Division 2	17	0	3	0	20	0
Nîmes	1985–86	Division 2	16	0	0	0	16	0
Bastia	1986–87	Division 2	10	2	2	0	12	2
Paris Saint-Germain	1987–88	Division 1	6	0	1	0	7	0
Bastia	1988–89	Division 2	25	2	0	0	25	2
Bastia	1989–90	Division 2	0	0	0	0	0	0
Bastia	1990–91	Division 2	28	0	1	0	29	0
Bastia	1991–92	Division 2	17	0	1	0	18	0
Bastia	1992–93	Division 2	8	1	0	0	8	1
Bastia	1993–94	Division 2	0	0	0	0	0	0
Bastia	Total		78	3	2	0	80	3
Career total			166	5	11	0	177	5

== See also ==
- List of people who disappeared mysteriously (2000–present)
