= Persol (disambiguation) =

Persol is an Italian brand of luxury eyewear.

Persol may also refer to:

- Persol Holdings, a Japanese human resource management company
- Stéphane Persol, a French footballer
