= 1986–87 French Division 2 =

48th season of the second-tier football league in France

Division 2
- Season: 1986–87

Statistics of Division 2 in the 1986–87 season.

== Overview ==
It was contested by 36 teams, and Chamois Niort and Montpellier won the championship.

== League tables ==
=== Group A ===
Pos	Team	Pld	W	D	L	GF	GA	GD	Pts	Promotion or relegation
1	Niort	34	24	7	3	48	15	+33	55	Promoted
2	Caen	34	21	6	7	62	30	+32	48	
3	Mulhouse	34	16	14	4	54	29	+25	46	
4	Reims	34	18	7	9	53	34	+19	43	
5	Stade Quimpérois	34	14	13	7	48	36	+12	41	
6	Beauvais	34	15	8	11	47	39	+8	38	
7	Tours	34	11	13	10	37	36	+1	35	
8	Dunkerque	34	12	9	13	33	41	−8	33	
9	Strasbourg	34	12	8	14	42	40	+2	32	
10	Guingamp	34	10	12	12	48	47	+1	32	
11	Orléans	34	11	10	13	33	35	−2	32	
12	Angers	34	9	14	11	34	41	−7	32	
13	Valenciennes	34	10	11	13	37	39	−2	31	
14	La Roche sur Yon	34	9	11	14	34	40	−6	29	
15	Abbeville	34	8	10	16	28	44	−16	26	
16	St Dizier	34	6	12	16	34	52	−18	24	
17	Amiens	34	5	13	16	25	56	−31	23	Relegated
18	Red Star	34	4	4	26	25	68	−43	12	Relegated

Source: rsssf.com

=== Group B ===
Pos	Team	Pld	W	D	L	GF	GA	GD	Pts	Promotion or relegation
1	Montpellier	34	22	8	4	73	25	+48	52	Promoted
2	Lyon	34	19	10	5	71	28	+43	48	
3	Cannes	34	20	5	9	57	24	+33	45	Promoted
4	Alès	34	16	11	7	47	24	+23	43	
5	Bastia	34	17	7	10	62	49	+13	41	
6	Nîmes	34	13	12	9	62	45	+17	38	
7	Limoges	34	13	10	11	35	34	+1	36	Relegated
8	Sète	34	13	9	12	40	41	−1	35	
9	Montceau	34	12	10	12	41	38	+3	34	
10	Cuiseaux Louhans	34	11	12	11	41	44	−3	34	
11	Gueugnon	34	10	13	11	31	42	−11	33	
12	Le Puy	34	10	10	14	36	40	−4	30	
13	Gazélec Ajaccio	34	10	9	15	38	51	−13	29	
14	Istres	34	9	11	14	33	47	−14	29	
15	Martigues	34	9	9	16	29	41	−12	27	
16	Thonon	34	7	10	17	27	45	−18	24	Relegated
17	Bourges	34	7	8	19	32	60	−28	22	Relegated
18	Béziers	34	2	8	24	18	95	−77	12	Relegated

Source: rsssf.com

== Championship play-offs ==
Team 1	Agg.	Team 2	1st leg	2nd leg
Niort	1–4	Montpellier	0–1	1–3

== Promotion play-offs ==
Quarter-final
2A	Caen	1
3B	Cannes	2
2B	Lyon	4
3A	Mulhouse	3

Semi-final
3B	Cannes	1	0	2
2B	Lyon	1	1	1

Final
18	Sochaux	1	0	1
3B	Brest	0	2	2

== Top goalscorers ==
Rank	Player	Club (Grp)	Goals
1	(Socialist Federal Republic of Yugoslavia) Tony Kurbos	Mulhouse (A)	21
2	(Republic of the Congo) Gaspard N'Gouete	Bastia (B)	20
2	(France) Jean-Pierre Orts	Lyon (B)	20
4	(Cameroon) Roger Milla	Montpellier (B)	19
5	(France) Laurent Blanc	Montpellier (B)	18
6	(France) François Calderaro	Reims (A)	17
6	(France) Alain Zemb	Louhans-Cuiseaux (B)	17
8	(France) Philippe Prieur	Caen (A)	16
8	(France) Bruno Roux	Beauvais (A)	16
10	(France) Christian Perez	Nîmes (B)	14
10	(France) Didier Monczuk	Alès (B)	14
10	(Socialist Federal Republic of Yugoslavia) Milan Ćalasan	Orléans (A)	14
10	(Cameroon) Abedi Pelé	Niort (A)	14
