= 1987–88 Coupe de France =

Tournament details
- Country: France

Final positions
- Champions: FC Metz
- Runners-up: Sochaux

The Coupe de France 1987–88 was its 71st edition. It was won by FC Metz.

== Round of 16 ==
Team 1	Agg.	Team 2	1st leg	2nd leg
Toulouse FC (D1)	2–2 (1–4 p)	OGC Nice (D1)	1–1	1–1 (a.e.t.)
Lille OSC (D1)	2–2	AJ Auxerre (D1)	1–0	1–2
Montpellier HSC (D1)	2–3	FC Sochaux-Montbéliard (D2)	2–2	0–1
Stade de Reims (D2)	2–1	Le Havre AC (D1)	2–0	0–1
FC Metz (D1)	3–0	FC Mulhouse (D2)	1–0	2–0
FC Sète (D2)	0–1	RC Lens (D1)	0–0	0–1
AEP Bourg sous la Roche (D2)	3–5	Stade Quimpérois (D2)	1–3	2–2
SO Châtellerault (D2)	0–0 (5–4 p)	US Créteil (D3)	0–0	0–0 (a.e.t.)

== Quarter-finals ==
Team 1	Agg.	Team 2	1st leg	2nd leg
OGC Nice (D1)	4–0	Lille OSC (D1)	3–0	1–0
RC Lens (D1)	2–3	FC Sochaux-Montbéliard (D2)	2–2	0–1
Stade Quimpérois (D2)	1–5	FC Metz (D1)	1–0	0–5
Stade de Reims (D2)	6–1	SO Châtellerault (D2)	3–0	3–1

== Semi-finals ==
=== First leg ===
1 June 1988

Metz (1)	4–0	Reims (2)
Micciche 27', 51'; Gaillot 77'; Zénier 85' (pen.)

Stade Saint-Symphorien, Metz
Attendance: 21,939
Referee: Jean-Claude Hirtz

31 May 1988

Nice (1)	2–1	Sochaux (2)
N'Dioro 37'; Bocandé 67'		Silvestre 88'

Stade du Ray, Nice
Attendance: 16,522
Referee: Robert Wurtz

=== Second leg ===
8 June 1988

Reims (2)	3–1	Metz (1)
Christophe 33'; Lafond 44'; Prince 67'		Hinschberger 79'

Stade Auguste Delaune, Reims
Attendance: 18,000
Referee: Joël Quiniou

Metz won 5–3 on aggregate.

8 June 1988

Sochaux (2)	2–0	Nice (1)
Sauzée 20'; Paille 80'

Stade Auguste Bonal, Montbéliard
Attendance: 15,000
Referee: Michel Girard

Sochaux won 3–2 on aggregate.

== Final ==
11 June 1988
20:30

Metz	1–1 (a.e.t.)	Sochaux
Black 45'		Paille 36'
Penalties
Zénier (penalty scored); Hinschberger (penalty scored); Zanon (penalty scored); Bracconi (penalty scored); Kastendeuch (penalty scored)	5–4	(penalty scored) Hadžibegić; (penalty scored) Sauzée; (penalty scored) Paille; (penalty scored) Rousset; (penalty missed) Madar

Parc des Princes, Paris
Attendance: 44,531
Referee: Claude Bouillet
