= Bernard Héréson =

French footballer (born 1969)

Personal information
- Date of birth: 8 January 1969 (age 57)
- Place of birth: Pointe-à-Pitre, France
- Height: 1.76 m (5 ft 9 in)
- Position: Defender

Senior career*
Years	Team	Apps	(Gls)
1990–1991	Laval		
1991–1992	Paris Saint-Germain		
1992–1995	Lens		
1995–1998	Caen		
1998–2001	US Créteil		
2001–2002	Rouen		
- * Club domestic league appearances and goals

Bernard Héréson (born 8 January 1969) is a French former football defender.
