= Franck Silvestre =

French footballer (born 1967)

Personal information
- Full name: Franck Claude Silvestre
- Date of birth: 5 April 1967 (age 59)
- Place of birth: Paris, France
- Height: 1.80 m (5 ft 11 in)
- Position: Centre back

Youth career
- Sochaux

Senior career*
| Years | Team | Apps | (Gls) |
| 1985–1993 | Sochaux | 240 | (14) |
| 1993–1998 | Auxerre | 160 | (5) |
| 1998–2002 | Montpellier | 134 | (23) |
| 2003 | Bastia | 16 | (2) |
| 2003–2005 | Sturm Graz | 75 | (4) |
| 2006 | Sète | 13 | (0) |
| Total | | 638 | (48) |

International career
| 1986–1988 | France U21 | 6 | (1) |
| 1989–1992 | France | 12 | (0) |
- * Club domestic league appearances and goals

Franck Claude Silvestre (born 5 April 1967) is a French former professional footballer who played as a centre back.

During his career, spent in two countries and with six different clubs, he played in more than 700 official games. A French international during three years, Silvestre represented the nation at Euro 1992.

== Career ==
Born in Paris, Silvestre began his professional career at FC Sochaux-Montbéliard in 1985. An undisputed first-choice when he was just 18, he saw the club be relegated into the French second division in 1987, but it immediately gained promotion to the top level, also reaching the French Cup final the next year, lost against FC Metz. The player topped a great 1988 winning the UEFA European Under-21 Football Championship with France U21s.

In 1989 Silvestre, who did not play for a big team, received his first senior callup from national team boss Michel Platini, making his international debut against the Republic of Ireland; he was also selected for UEFA Euro 1992, but remained on the bench as the national side exited on the group stage – he gained a total of 11 caps, the last coming in 1992 with his final call-up as an unused substitute the following year.

Silvestre signed in the 1993 summer for Guy Roux's AJ Auxerre, making up for William Prunier's departure. During his years in the team, which featured Dutch Frank Verlaat, Laurent Blanc and Frédéric Danjou, he won two domestic cups and one league, including the historic 1995–96 double, also appearing in the UEFA Champions League.

In 1998, Silvestre moved to Montpellier HSC, where he again was an undisputed starter, also eventually becoming team captain. In his third year, he helped the side return to the top division, after netting a career-best nine goals (in 33 matches); eventually, in January 2003, he left for SC Bastia, contributing to a comfortable escape from relegation.

Aged already 36, Silvestre had his first abroad experience, joining SK Sturm Graz in Austria, where he continued to appear regularly, albeit without no silverware conquered. In January 2006, he signed for his last club, second division FC Sète, not managing to help the club maintain its league status, and retiring with a total of 638 league matches played.

== Honours ==
Sochaux

- Division 2: 1987–88
- Coupe de France runner-up: 1987–88

Auxerre

- Division 1: 1995–96
- Coupe de France: 1993–94, 1995–96

Montpellier

- UEFA Intertoto Cup: 1999

France U21

- UEFA European Under-21 Championship: 1988
