= Yvan Lebourgeois =

French footballer (born 1962)

- Footballer Yvan Lebourgeois in 2005

Personal information
- Date of birth: 26 October 1962 (age 64)
- Place of birth: Noyers-Bocage, France
- Height: 1.82 m (6 ft 0 in)
- Position: Defender

Youth career
- ASPTT Caen

Senior career*
Years	Team	Apps	(Gls)
1984–1996	SM Caen	357	(30)
1996–1997	Saint-Denis Saint-Leu FC	22	(0)
Total		379	(30)
- * Club domestic league appearances and goals

Yvan Lebourgeois (born 26 October 1962) is a French former professional football defender.

== Career ==
Lebourgeois was born in Noyers-Bocage. He spent almost all his playing career at Stade Malherbe Caen. He holds the record for SM Caen appearances in Division 1, having played 200 first-team matches between 1988 and 1995.
