= Philippe Dehouck =

French football player and manager (born 1966)

Personal information
- Date of birth: 2 August 1966 (age 60)
- Place of birth: Lille, France
- Position: Midfielder

Senior career*
| Years | Team | Apps | (Gls) |
| 1985–1987 | Thonon | 51 | (0) |
| 1987–1990 | Paris Saint-Germain | 3 | (0) |
| 1988–1990 | → Annecy (loan) | 58 | (1) |
| 1992–1994 | Châtellerault | | |
- Thonon
| Total | | 112+ | (1+) |

Managerial career
- US Mont Blanc Passy
- FC Taninges
- 2007–2008: US Évian Lugrin
- FC Taninges
- SC Morzine Vallée d'Aulps
- * Club domestic league appearances and goals

Philippe Dehouck (born 2 August 1966) is a French former professional football player and manager.

== Playing career ==
Dehouck was born in Lille, but began his professional career in the city of Thonon-les-Bains. He played two seasons in the Division 2 with Thonon before joining Paris Saint-Germain in 1987.

On 27 February 1988, Dehouck made his debut for PSG in a 0–0 draw against Bordeaux. He played his final match for the club on 30 April 1988, a 4–0 loss to Nice. For the following two seasons, Dehouck was loaned out to Annecy in the Division 2; he played a total of 58 games for the club.

== Career statistics ==
Appearances and goals by club, season and competition
| Club | Season | League | | | Cup | | Total | |
| Club | Season | Division | Apps | Goals | Apps | Goals | Apps | Goals |
|---|---|---|---|---|---|---|---|---|
| Thonon | 1985–86 | Division 2 | 22 | 0 | 0 | 0 | 22 | 0 |
| Thonon | 1986–87 | Division 2 | 29 | 0 | 1 | 0 | 30 | 0 |
| Thonon | Total | | 51 | 0 | 1 | 0 | 52 | 0 |
| Paris Saint-Germain | 1987–88 | Division 1 | 3 | 0 | 1 | 0 | 4 | 0 |
| Annecy (loan) | 1988–89 | Division 2 | 32 | 0 | 0 | 0 | 32 | 0 |
| Annecy (loan) | 1989–90 | Division 2 | 26 | 1 | 0 | 0 | 26 | 1 |
| Annecy (loan) | Total | | 58 | 1 | 0 | 0 | 58 | 1 |
| Career total | | | 112 | 1 | 2 | 0 | 114 | 1 |
