= 1990–91 French Division 2 =

52nd season of the second-tier football league in France

Division 2
- Season: 1990–91

Statistics of Division 2 in the 1990–91 season.

== Overview ==
It was contested by 36 teams, and Nîmes Olympique and Le Havre won the championship.

== League tables ==
=== Group A ===
Pos	Team	Pld	W	D	L	GF	GA	GD	Pts	Promotion or relegation
1	Nîmes Olympique	34	17	10	7	40	27	+13	44	Promoted
2	RC Strasbourg	34	19	5	10	70	37	+33	43	
3	Valenciennes	34	13	17	4	30	17	+13	43	
4	Olympique Alès	34	17	9	8	37	32	+5	43	
5	Istres	34	14	9	11	41	41	0	37	
6	Bastia	34	12	11	11	46	35	+11	35	
7	Avignon	34	10	15	9	41	37	+4	35	Relegated
8	Rodez	34	10	14	10	32	38	−6	34	
9	Annecy	34	10	13	11	26	25	+1	33	
10	Mulhouse	34	11	10	13	41	35	+6	32	
11	Martigues	34	11	10	13	41	38	+3	32	
12	Gueugnon	34	9	14	11	30	29	+1	32	
13	Épinal	34	11	8	15	33	40	−7	30	
14	Gazélec Ajaccio	34	11	8	15	30	39	−9	30	
15	Chaumont	34	10	10	14	32	50	−18	30	Relegated
16	Louhans-Cuiseaux	34	7	14	13	28	36	−8	28	
17	Dunkerque	34	6	14	14	17	36	−19	26	
18	Dijon	34	7	11	16	29	52	−23	25	Relegated

Source: rsssf.com

=== Group B ===
Pos	Team	Pld	W	D	L	GF	GA	GD	Pts	Promotion or relegation
1	Le Havre	34	18	11	5	52	17	+35	47	Promoted
2	Lens	34	14	14	6	49	26	+23	42	Promoted
3	Stade Lavallois	34	16	9	9	49	29	+20	41	
4	Angers	34	16	8	10	52	32	+20	40	
5	Rouen	34	15	10	9	46	26	+20	40	
6	Stade Reims	34	13	11	10	38	29	+9	37	Relegated
7	En Avant Guingamp	34	12	11	11	35	37	−2	35	
8	St Seurin	34	10	14	10	33	37	−4	34	
9	Tours	34	9	15	10	26	32	−6	33	
10	Red Star Paris	34	9	14	11	36	43	−7	32	
11	Beauvais	34	9	13	12	21	25	−4	31	
12	La Roche sur Yon	34	10	11	13	35	46	−11	31	
13	Bourges	34	10	11	13	35	51	−16	31	
14	Le Mans	34	8	14	12	28	33	−5	30	
15	Chamois Niort	34	9	11	14	26	33	−7	29	Relegated
16	Orléans	34	7	14	13	29	41	−12	28	
17	US Créteil	34	7	12	15	28	52	−24	26	Relegated
18	Olympique Saint-Quentin	34	7	11	16	24	53	−29	25	

Source: rsssf.com

== Championship play-offs ==
Team 1	Agg.	Team 2	1st leg	2nd leg
Le Havre	3–0	Nîmes	3–0	0–0

== Promotion play-offs ==
Semi-final
2A	Strasbourg	3
3B	Laval	1
2B	Lens	1
3A	Valenciennes	0

Final
2A	Strasbourg	1	1	2
2B	Lens	1	3	4

== Top goalscorers ==
Rank	Player	Club (Grp)	Goals
1	(France) Didier Monczuk	Strasbourg (A)	23
2	(France) Christophe Lagrange	Angers (B)	19
3	(France) Frank Leboeuf	Strasbourg (A)/Laval (B)	18
3	(France) Patrick Weiss	Épinal (A)	18
5	(France) Yves Mangione	Alès (A)	17
6	(France) Jean-Pierre Orts	Rouen (B)	16
6	(Czechoslovakia) Ľubomír Luhový	Martigues (A)	16
8	(Switzerland) Nestor Subiat	Mulhouse (A)	15
9	(France) Didier Tholot	Reims (B)	14
10	(Ivory Coast) Joël Tiéhi	Le Havre (B)	13
10	(France) Bruno Roux	Le Havre (B)	13
