= Éric Lada =

French footballer (born 1965)

Personal information
- Date of birth: October 14, 1965 (age 61)
- Place of birth: Chartres, France
- Height: 1.78 m (5 ft 10 in)
- Position: Striker

Senior career*
Years	Team	Apps	(Gls)
1981–1982	Paris FC (B team)		
1982–1987	Sochaux	55	(6)
1987–1988	Nîmes Olympique (loan)	30	(6)
1988–1990	Sochaux	58	(7)
1990–1991	Marseille	9	(0)
1990–1992	Marseille (B team)		
1992–1994	Toulouse	32	(3)
1996–1997	Marseille Endoume		
1998–2001	Olympique Noisy-le-Sec		

International career
1987–1988	France U21	4	(0)
- * Club domestic league appearances and goals as of 13:48, 19 October 2009 (UTC)

Éric Lada (born October 14, 1965) is a French former professional footballer. He was a member of the 1988 UEFA European Under-21 Championship-winning France under-21 squad. His nephew, Ludovic Sylvestre, also played football professionally.
