= David Rinçon =

French footballer (born 1970)

Personal information
- Date of birth: 8 March 1970 (age 56)
- Place of birth: Versailles, France
- Position: Forward

Youth career
- Saint-Cyr
- Paris Saint-Germain

Senior career*
Years	Team	Apps	(Gls)
1989–1992	Paris Saint-Germain		
1992–1993	Châteauroux		
1993–1996	USL Dunkerque		
1996–2003	Mulhouse		
2003–2005	Dannemarie		
2005–2006	Balschwiller		
2006–2008	Mertzen		

International career
1987	France U-16	3	(1)

Managerial career
- 2012–2015: Hirtzbach (assistant)
- 2015–2016: Hirtzbach
- 2016–2017: Sierentz (assistant)
- 2017–2019: Blotzheim
- 20XX–20XX: EHB (assistant)
- * Club domestic league appearances and goals

David Rinçon (born 8 March 1970) is a former French football forward.

== Coaching career ==
In 2012, Rinçon became assistant coach of FC Hirtzbach under his former FC Mulhouse teammate, Hervé Milazzo. In the 2015-16 season, after Milazzo left the club, Rinçon took over as manager. In the 2016-17 season, Rinçon was an assistant coach at FC Sierentz under manager Florian D’Almeida.

Ahead of the 2017-18 season, Rinçon was presented as the new manager of AS Blotzheim. He left the club in 2019.

In 2019, FC Hagenbach and Rinçon's former club, FC Balschwiller, merged to form the new club Entente Hagenbach-Balschwiller. Rinçon later became both vice-president and assistant coach of the new club.
