= Michel Rio (footballer) =

French footballer (born 1963)

Personal information
- Date of birth: 7 March 1963 (age 63)
- Place of birth: Saint-Brieuc, France
- Height: 1.79 m (5 ft 10 1/2 in)
- Position: Midfielder

Senior career*
Years	Team	Apps	(Gls)
1980–1982	US Montagnarde		
1982–1984	Stade Briochin		
1984–1986	Guingamp	85	(27)
1986–1988	Nantes	51	(2)
1988–1989	Metz	24	(4)
1989–1992	Caen	113	(17)
1992–1994	Le Havre	60	(6)
1994–1996	Stade Briochin		
1996–1997	Stade Lamballais		
Total		333+	(58+)

Managerial career
- 2004–2010: CO Briochin SP
- 2012–2015: Plérin FC
- * Club domestic league appearances and goals

Michel Rio (born 7 March 1963) is a French former professional footballer who played as a midfielder.

== Career ==
Rio played at a professional level in the Division 1 (later renamed Ligue 1) for Nantes, Metz, Caen and Le Havre, and in the Division 2 (later renamed Ligue 2) for Guingamp and Stade Briochin. He made 237 total appearances in the Division 1, scoring 29 goals.

On 15 February 1992, Rio scored the fastest goal in Division 1 history, putting the ball in the back of net after eight seconds of play in an encounter between Caen and Cannes. On 21 August 2022, over thirty years later, Paris Saint-Germain forward Kylian Mbappé scored a goal against Lille that was clocked at eight seconds as well, thereby equalling Rio's longstanding record. However, according to newspaper L'Équipe and several other calculations, Mbappé's goal was scored slightly later, signifying that Rio's record remained unmatched.
