= 1987–88 French Division 1 =

50th season of French Division 1

Division 1
- Season: 1987–88
- Champions: Monaco (5th title)
- Relegated: Niort; Brest; Le Havre
- European Cup: Monaco
- Cup Winners' Cup: Metz
- UEFA Cup: Bordeaux; Montpellier
- Matches: 380
- Goals: 854 (2.25 per match)
- Top goalscorer: Jean-Pierre Papin (19)

AS Monaco won Division 1 season 1987-88 of the French Association Football League with 52 points.

== Participating teams ==
- Auxerre
- Bordeaux
- Stade Brest
- AS Cannes
- Stade Lavallois
- Le Havre AC
- RC Lens
- Lille
- Olympique Marseille
- FC Metz
- AS Monaco
- Montpellier La Paillade SC
- FC Nantes Atlantique
- OGC Nice
- Chamois Niortais
- Matra Racing
- Paris Saint-Germain FC
- AS Saint-Etienne
- Sporting Toulon Var
- Toulouse FC
Location of teams in 1987–88 Division 1

== League table ==
Pos	Team	Pld	W	D	L	GF	GA	GD	Pts	Qualification or relegation
1	Monaco (C)	38	20	12	6	53	29	+24	52	Qualification to European Cup first round
2	Bordeaux	38	18	10	10	46	30	+16	46	Qualification to UEFA Cup first round
3	Montpellier	38	18	9	11	68	38	+30	45	Qualification to UEFA Cup first round
4	Saint-Étienne	38	18	6	14	54	56	−2	42	
5	Toulon	38	14	13	11	41	26	+15	41	
6	Marseille	38	18	5	15	49	43	+6	41	
7	Matra Racing	38	12	17	9	35	42	−7	41	
8	Metz	38	16	8	14	46	40	+6	40	Qualification to Cup Winners' Cup first round (Note: Metz qualified for 1988–89 European Cup Winners' Cup as winners of the 1987–88 Coupe de France.)
9	Auxerre	38	12	15	11	37	29	+8	39	
10	Nantes	38	13	13	12	46	41	+5	39	
11	Lille	38	14	9	15	45	39	+6	37	
12	Cannes	38	13	11	14	42	52	−10	37	
13	Toulouse	38	14	7	17	35	47	−12	35	
14	Laval	38	12	10	16	38	38	0	34	
15	Paris Saint-Germain	38	12	10	16	36	45	−9	34	
16	Nice	38	15	3	20	42	47	−5	33	
17	Lens	38	13	7	18	40	62	−22	33	
18	Niort (R)	38	11	10	17	34	42	−8	32	Qualification to relegation play-offs
19	Brest (R)	38	11	10	17	32	52	−20	32	Relegation to French Division 2
20	Le Havre (R)	38	8	11	19	35	56	−21	27	Relegation to French Division 2

Source: Histoire du PSG
Rules for classification: 1) points; 2) goal difference; 3) number of goals scored.
Victory: 2 points, Draw: 1 point, Defeat: 0 points
(C) Champions; (R) Relegated
Notes:

Promoted from Division 2, who will play in Division 1 season 1988/1989

- RC Strasbourg:Champion of Division 2, winner of Division 2 group B
- FC Sochaux-Montbéliard:Runner-up, winner of Division 2 group A
- SM Caen:Third place, winner of barrages against Chamois Niortais

== Results ==
Home \ Away	AUX	BOR	BRE	CAN	LAV	LHA	RCL	LIL	OM	MRC	MET	ASM	MHS	FCN	NIC	NIO	PSG	STE	SCT	TFC
Auxerre		1–3	4–0	1–0	1–1	1–1	2–0	2–1	2–0	3–0	0–1	0–0	1–1	1–0	2–0	1–3	3–0	0–1	0–0	0–2
Bordeaux	0–0		2–0	3–3	1–0	2–2	5–2	1–0	2–0	1–0	3–2	3–1	1–0	2–1	4–2	1–0	0–0	1–0	3–0	2–2
Brest	1–1	1–1		1–0	2–1	3–1	4–1	2–2	2–1	0–0	1–0	0–2	4–0	0–0	0–1	1–0	0–0	1–0	1–0	1–0
Cannes	0–0	1–0	2–1		1–0	3–0	2–1	1–5	1–0	3–1	3–3	1–1	0–0	1–4	0–1	2–1	1–3	1–0	1–0	1–1
Laval	0–0	0–0	0–0	2–1		4–3	4–0	0–1	0–2	1–1	3–0	0–0	1–0	1–1	1–2	2–0	2–0	4–0	0–3	1–0
Le Havre	1–2	0–1	3–2	2–2	2–1		0–1	0–0	1–0	1–1	1–1	0–0	1–3	1–0	2–1	3–0	0–1	1–1	1–1	0–1
Lens	2–1	1–0	2–1	0–0	1–2	0–0		1–1	2–4	2–1	2–0	1–3	2–1	1–2	0–1	3–1	0–0	1–0	3–1	2–0
Lille	0–1	1–0	2–0	0–0	0–0	0–0	1–1		1–1	5–0	1–0	0–1	3–1	3–0	1–0	0–1	1–0	1–2	1–0	2–0
Marseille	0–1	1–0	1–0	3–0	2–1	3–1	4–1	0–1		2–0	1–0	2–0	1–1	3–0	2–0	1–0	1–2	5–1	1–1	1–0
Matra Racing	1–0	1–0	1–1	0–0	1–0	2–0	1–0	3–0	0–0		2–0	1–0	0–2	2–2	2–1	1–1	2–1	2–2	0–0	0–0
Metz	1–0	2–0	1–1	2–3	2–1	1–0	2–2	3–1	3–1	0–0		2–2	0–1	1–0	2–0	2–0	1–0	2–1	2–0	4–1
Monaco	3–2	1–0	2–0	4–1	2–0	2–0	3–0	1–0	3–1	3–0	2–1		0–0	2–1	1–0	1–3	2–1	2–1	0–0	5–1
Montpellier	2–2	0–0	6–0	4–2	2–1	3–1	4–0	3–1	4–0	6–1	1–0	2–1		0–0	4–1	1–0	4–1	5–0	0–1	4–2
Nantes	0–0	1–0	1–0	2–1	1–2	2–0	2–0	1–1	5–0	1–1	0–0	1–1	0–0		0–1	2–1	0–0	2–3	1–1	3–1
Nice	1–0	0–1	2–0	1–2	0–1	1–2	0–1	2–1	3–1	1–2	0–0	0–0	2–0	3–1		1–0	2–0	2–3	0–2	3–0
Niort	0–0	0–0	3–0	2–0	0–0	1–2	1–1	1–0	1–0	2–2	1–3	0–0	1–0	1–3	0–0		1–2	2–1	2–1	0–0
Paris SG	1–1	1–0	0–0	1–1	0–0	2–0	4–1	1–3	1–1	1–1	0–2	0–1	2–1	0–2	0–4	1–3		3–0	1–0	2–0
Saint-Étienne	2–1	1–1	4–0	1–0	2–1	2–1	2–1	4–3	0–1	0–2	2–0	3–0	2–1	1–1	3–2	2–0	1–3		0–0	2–0
Toulon	0–0	0–1	3–0	1–0	3–0	3–0	2–0	3–0	1–2	0–0	1–0	0–0	0–0	5–2	4–1	1–1	1–0	1–1		1–0
Toulouse	0–0	2–1	2–1	0–1	1–0	2–1	0–1	2–1	1–0	0–0	2–0	1–1	3–1	0–1	2–0	1–0	2–1	2–3	1–0	

Legend: Blue = home team win; Yellow = draw; Red = away team win.

== Relegation play-offs ==
Team 1	Agg.	Team 2	1st leg	2nd leg
Niort	1–4	Caen	1–1	0–3

== Top goalscorers ==
Rank	Player	Club	Goals
1	(France) Jean-Pierre Papin	Marseille	19
2	(France) Patrice Garande	Saint-Étienne	17
3	(England) Mark Hateley	Monaco	14
4	(West Germany) Klaus Allofs	Marseille	13
4	(France) Philippe Fargeon	Bordeaux	13
4	(Algeria) Chérif Oudjani	Lens	13
4	(Scotland) Mo Johnston	Nantes	13
8	(Cameroon) Roger Milla	Montpellier	12
8	(France) Christian Perez	Montpellier	12
8	(France) Philippe Tibeuf	Saint-Étienne	12

== Attendances ==
#	Club	Average
1	Marseille	25,233
2	PSG	19,775
3	Girondins	19,306
4	Saint-Étienne	18,975
5	Nantes	14,340
6	Toulouse	12,165
7	Racing	11,948
8	Metz	11,444
9	Lens	10,886
10	Chamois	10,142
11	AJA	9,133
12	MHSC	9,080
13	LOSC	8,118
14	Nice	8,003
15	Toulon	7,682
16	Laval	7,363
17	Le Havre	6,824
18	Monaco	6,621
19	Cannes	6,164
20	Brest	6,147
