= Jean-Pierre Bosser (footballer) =

French football player and manager (born 1960)

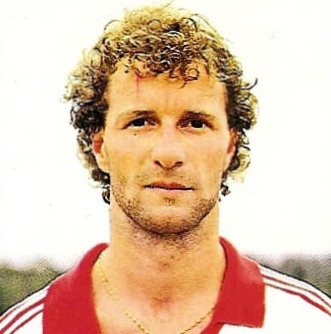
- Bosser with Brest

Personal information
- Full name: Jean-Pierre Bosser
- Date of birth: 22 March 1960 (age 66)
- Place of birth: Quimper, France
- Height: 1.86 m (6 ft 1 in)
- Position: Defender

Youth career
- Pont-l'Abbé

Senior career*
Years	Team	Apps	(Gls)
1977–1979	Quimper	21	(0)
1979–1981	Angers	41	(0)
1981–1982	Montluçon	18+ (Note: Statistics for the 1981–82 Division 2 may be inaccurate.)	(0+)
1982–1988	Brest	180	(7)
1988–1989	Nice	37	(0)
1989–1991	Paris Saint-Germain	54	(0)
1991–1993	Mulhouse	45	(3)
Total		396+	(10+)

International career
1988	Brittany	1	(0)

Managerial career
- 2002–2008: US Crozon Morgat
- 2011–2013: Marcassins de Trégoat
- 2013: Saint-Denis
- * Club domestic league appearances and goals

Jean-Pierre Bosser (born 22 March 1960) is a French former professional football player and manager. As a player, he was a defender.

== Early life and career ==
Bosser was born in Quimper in the Brittany region of France on 22 March 1960. During his youth career, he played for a club in the town of Pont-l'Abbé.

== Club career ==
A "solid" defender, Bosser began his professional career in his hometown club of Quimper. After two years there, he moved to Angers. Following two seasons at the SCO, he transferred to Montluçon, where he would only play one season. In 1982, Bosser was a soldier at the Bataillon de Joinville. Although unrelated to his military duty, he suffered a "serious" injury that put his football career on hold for six months that year. He had been shot by a shotgun in the leg following an assault in Bénodet. That same year, he signed for Brest, the club at which he would play for six seasons. Bosser notably holds the record for the most Division 1 appearances of any Brest player. On 8 February 1986, he scored a goal from 60 meters against Toulon after the opposing goalkeeper Pascal Olmeta had gone up to midfield.

After his spell at Brest, Bosser signed for Nice in 1988. He would stay at the club a single season before moving on to Paris Saint-Germain. With PSG, he made 60 appearances, including 3 in the UEFA Cup. He finished his professional career at Mulhouse in 1993.

== International career ==
Bosser played one match for the Brittany regional team in 1988. It was an indoor match that Brittany won 6–2 over the United States.

== Managerial career ==
After retiring from professional football, Bosser became a player-manager for several small Breton clubs. He went on to coach Guilvinec, Crozon Morgat (where he would oversee four successive promotions from the Promotion d'Honneur up to the Division d'Honneur), Pont-l'Abbé (his former youth club), Coray, Plozévet, and Landudec. In June 2011, he became the manager of Marcassins de Trégoat.

After one and a half seasons at Marcassins, Bosser joined Saint-Denis in Réunion. There, he signed a contract from 1 February to 31 December 2013. However, this experience turned out to be a failure for him, as the club suffered relegation to the second tier.

== Career statistics ==
Appearances and goals by club, season and competition
Club	Season	League			Cup		Europe		Total	
Club	Season	Division	Apps	Goals	Apps	Goals	Apps	Goals	Apps	Goals
Quimper	1977–78	Division 2	1	0	0	0	—		1	0
Quimper	1978–79	Division 2	20	0	2	0	—		22	0
Quimper	Total		21	0	2 (Note: Statistics in the Coupe de France while Bosser played for Division 2 sides may be inaccurate.)	0	—		23	0
Angers	1979–80	Division 1	7	0	1	0	—		8	0
Angers	1980–81	Division 1	34	0	3	0	—		37	0
Angers	Total		41	0	4	0	—		45	0
Montluçon	1981–82	Division 2	18	0	0	0	—		18	0
Brest	1982–83	Division 1	21	2	6	0	—		27	2
Brest	1983–84	Division 1	33	1	1	0	—		34	1
Brest	1984–85	Division 1	28	0	3	0	—		31	0
Brest	1985–86	Division 1	33	2	4	0	—		37	2
Brest	1986–87	Division 1	34	1	5	0	—		39	1
Brest	1987–88	Division 1	31	1	1	0	—		32	1
Brest	Total		180	7	20	0	—		200	7
Nice	1988–89	Division 1	37	0	3	0	—		40	0
Paris Saint-Germain	1989–90	Division 1	29	0	1	0	3 (Note: Appearances in the UEFA Cup.)	0	33	0
Paris Saint-Germain	1990–91	Division 1	25	0	2	0	—		27	0
Paris Saint-Germain	Total		54	0	3	0	3	0	60	0
Mulhouse	1991–92	Division 2	29	2	2	0	—		31	2
Mulhouse	1992–93	Division 2	16	1	0	0	—		16	1
Mulhouse	Total		45	3	2	0	—		47	3
Career total			396	10	34	0	3	0	433	10
