= Christian Zajaczkowski =

French footballer and manager (born 1961)

Personal information
- Date of birth: 16 February 1961 (age 65)
- Place of birth: Clermont-Ferrand, France
- Height: 1.83 m (6 ft 0 in)
- Positions: Midfielder; defender

Youth career
- Cébazat Sports

Senior career*
Years	Team	Apps	(Gls)
1977–1980	Châteauroux	72	(5)
1980–1985	Rennes	147	(5)
1985–1987	Le Havre	66	(5)
1987–1990	Paris Saint-Germain	12	(0)
1988–1989	→ Lens (loan)	12	(0)
1989–1990	→ Abbeville (loan)	22	(1)
1990–1991	Montferrand		
1991–1992	Vallauris		
1992–1994	Périgueux		
Total		331+	(16+)

International career
- France U21

Managerial career
- 1994–1995: Périgueux
- 1995–1996: Brive
- 1996–1997: Brive B
- 1997–1998: Chappes
- 1998–1999: Rouen U17
- Rouen B
- 2002–2004: La Rochelle
- Saintes (youth)
- 2009–2010: Montluçon B
- FC Châtel-Guyon
- Cébazat Sports
- * Club domestic league appearances and goals

Christian Zajaczkowski (born 16 February 1961) is a French former professional football player and manager.

== International career ==
Born in France, Zajaczkowski is of Polish descent. He was a youth international for France at under-21 level.

== Honours ==
Rennes

- Division 2: 1982–83
