= Bruno Roux =

French footballer and manager (born 1963)

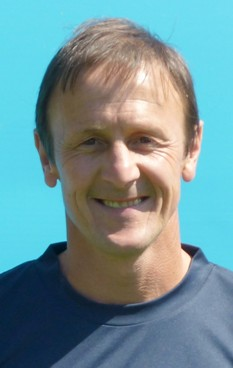
- Roux in 2016

Personal information
- Date of birth: 1 July 1963 (age 63)
- Place of birth: Noyon, France
- Height: 1.77 m (5 ft 10 in)
- Position: Forward

Team information
- Current team: US Ribécourt (head coach)

Youth career
- 1973–1974: AS Montmacq
- 1974–1983: US Ribécourt
- 1983–1984: Beauvais

Senior career*
Years	Team	Apps	(Gls)
1984–1987	Beauvais	63+ (Note: Statistics are missing for the 1984–85 season.)	(23+)
1987–1989	Paris Saint-Germain	26	(1)
1988–1989	→ Rouen (loan)	23	(10)
1989–1993	Le Havre	115	(30)
1993–1994	Rennes	37	(8)
1994–1996	Châteauroux	74	(34)
1996	Red Star	21	(3)
1997–1999	Beauvais	86	(25)
Total		445+	(134+)

Managerial career
- 1999–2001: Caen B (assistant)
- 2001–2002: Caen U17
- 2002–2004: Beauvais U18
- 2004–2008: Beauvais
- 2008–2011: Compiègne
- 2013–2018: Senlis
- 2018–: US Ribécourt
- * Club domestic league appearances and goals

Bruno Roux (born 1 July 1963) is a French football manager and former professional player who played as a forward. As of the 2021–22 season, he is the head coach of Départemental 1 club US Ribécourt.

== International career ==
Roux was an Olympic international for France.

== Personal life ==
Bruno's son, Nolan, is also a professional footballer.

== Honours ==
=== Player ===
Le Havre

- Division 2: 1990–91

=== Manager ===
Beauvais

- Championnat de France Amateur: 2005–06
