= Gabriel Calderón =

Argentine footballer and manager

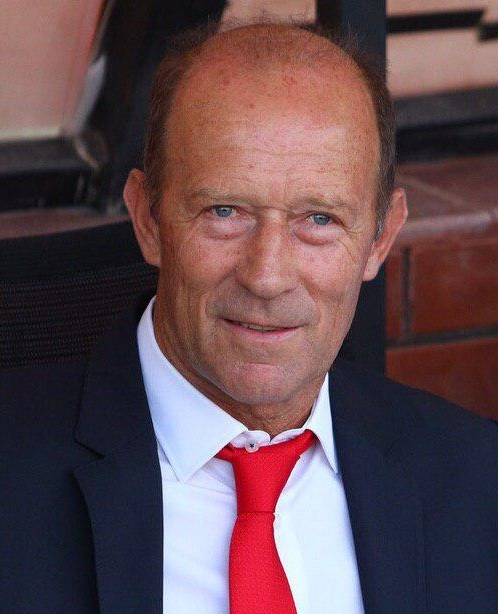
- Calderón managing Persepolis in 2019

Personal information
- Full name: Gabriel Humberto Calderón Metralla
- Date of birth: 7 February 1960 (age 66)
- Place of birth: Rawson, Argentina
- Height: 1.80 m (5 ft 11 in)
- Position: Midfielder

Team information
- Current team: Khor Fakkan

Youth career
- 1974–1976: El verde

Senior career*
Years	Team	Apps	(Gls)
1976–1977	El Verde	25	(3)
1977–1981	Racing Club	113	(16)
1978	→ Lanús (loan)	24	(0)
1981–1983	Independiente	74	(15)
1983–1987	Real Betis	131	(38)
1987–1990	Paris Saint-Germain	102	(20)
1990–1992	Sion	47	(17)
1992–1993	Caen	36	(2)
1993–1994	Lausanne Sports	31	(5)
Total		583	(116)

International career
1977–1981	Argentina U21	20	(5)
1981–1990	Argentina	23	(1)

Managerial career
- 1997–2000: Stade Malherbe Caen
- 2003: Lausanne Sport
- 2004–2005: Saudi Arabia
- 2007–2008: Oman
- 2008–2010: Al-Ittihad
- 2010–2011: Al-Hilal
- 2011–2012: Baniyas
- 2012–2013: Bahrain
- 2014: Real Betis
- 2014–2016: Al-Wasl
- 2017: Qatar SC
- 2019–2020: Persepolis
- 2022: Khor Fakkan
Medal record
Men's football
Representing Argentina
FIFA U-20 World Cup
Winner	1979 Japan
FIFA World Cup
Runner-up	1990 Italy
- * Club domestic league appearances and goals

Gabriel Humberto Calderón Metralla (born 7 February 1960) is an Argentinian professional football manager and former player.

Calderón played in several teams including Argentine Racing Club de Avellaneda and Club Atlético Independiente, Spanish Real Betis and French Paris Saint-Germain. He was part of the Argentina Under-20 team that won the 1979 FIFA World Youth Championship, and also played in the 1982 FIFA World Cup in Spain and in the 1990 FIFA World Cup in Italy. After his retirement, he managed Caen, Lausanne Sports and several teams in the Middle East including the Saudi Arabia national team, Omani national team, Al-Ittihad, Al-Hilal, Baniyas, Bahrain national team, Al-Wasl, Qatar SC and Persepolis F.C. He also managed La Liga side Real Betis.

== Playing career ==
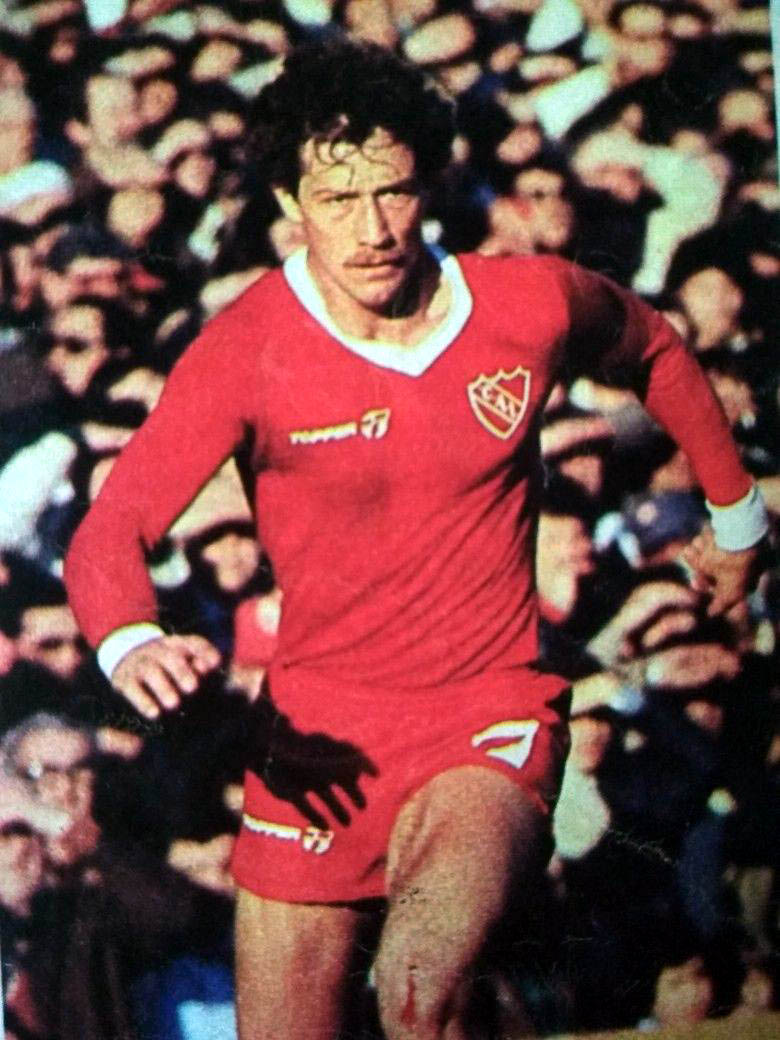
Calderón playing for Independiente in 1983

Calderón was born on 7 February 1960 in Rawson, Chubut Province. He began his football career in with Club El Porvenir B team in 1974 and was promoted to the original squad in 1976.

He was promoted to the El Porvenir original team in 1976 and was transferred to the Racing Club de Avellaneda in the next year after good showing and played three seasons and a half season at Club Atlético Lanús as loan.

Then, he played for Club Atlético Independiente for two seasons before moving to La Liga side, Real Betis. He played for Betis 131 times and scored 38 goals for them. In 1987, he moved to Ligue 1 Paris Saint-Germain and played for the club three seasons. He was one of the key players of PSG in his second season at the club. In 1990, he joined to FC Sion but returned to France to play for Stade Malherbe Caen in 1992. He moved back to Switzerland next year and finished his football career in FC Lausanne-Sport in 1994 at the age of 34.

=== International career ===
Calderón played for the Argentina Under-20 team and won the 1979 FIFA World Youth Championship. In 1981, he was invited to the national team by coach César Luis Menotti. He made his debut in a match against Brazil and scored his only international goal in a match against Denmark. He was part of the national team in 1982 FIFA World Cup held in Spain and in the 1990 FIFA World Cup in Italy and played along with Diego Maradona. He was key player of the national team in 1990 FIFA World Cup where Argentina reached the final match of the tournament. After the tournament, he retired from international career at the age of 30 after collecting 23 caps and scoring 1 goal for the Argentina national team.

=== International goals ===
Date	Venue	Opponent	Result	Competition	Goals
1987-04-02	Buenos Aires, Argentina	Denmark	1–0	Friendly	1

== Coaching career ==
=== Early years ===
Calderón began his managerial career in 1997 as head coach of Stade Malherbe Caen where he had played between 1992 and 1993. He was appointed as head coach of Lausanne Sports, another former club in 2003 but resigned after just five weeks due to poor results.

=== Saudi Arabia national team ===
Calderón then took over as the coach for the Saudi Arabia national football team at the end of 2004, and successfully guided the Saudi team to qualification for the Football World Cup 2006 in Germany by beating Uzbekistan 3–0 in Riyadh. Saudi Arabia was the only team in that qualification that lost no matches. Calderón said "Qualifying to the World Cup is the dream of every coach and I'm more than satisfied with our campaign in the qualifiers." "I'm very happy with the qualification since that was the goal I was aiming at when I first arrived in the Kingdom," he added.

However, in December 2005, Calderón was fired by the Saudi Arabia Football Federation as they were dissatisfied by the team's poor showing in the 2005 West Asian Games after a defeat to Iraq, and was replaced by Marcos Paqueta.

=== Oman national team ===
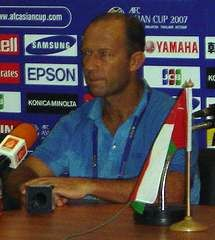
Calderón in a pre-match conference in the 2007 AFC Asian Cup

On 9 April 2007, Calderón signed as the coach of the Oman national football team and led the team at the 2007 AFC Asian Cup. Oman began the tournament with a 1–1 draw with Australia but was defeated 0–2 against co-host Thailand, then made a 0–0 draw with the tournament's winner, Iraq and was eliminated in the Group Stage. On 30 June 2008, he resigned as head coach of Oman national team in order to become the new head coach of Saudi Al-Ittihad.

=== Al-Ittihad ===
On 30 June 2008, he returned to Saudi Arabia to become new Al-Ittihad head coach. In his first season at Al-Ittihad, he eventually won the Saudi Premier League by beating Al-Hilal 2–1 in the final match of the league played at King Fahad Stadium in Riyadh and finished the season in first place, five points ahead of runner-up, Al-Hilal. However, there was no success in the league, as Al-Ittihad were eliminated from the 2008 ACL and lost the final game of King Cup of Champions to Al-Shabab. In the second and final season at Al-Ittihad, he won King Cup of Champions which beat Al-Hilal in the final match. He also led the club to the final match of 2009 AFC Champions League, win the Group A and defeated compatriot Al-Shabab 2–1 in the Round of 16. Then, beat Uzbek Pakhtakor 5–1 aggregate and Nagoya Grampus 8–3 to reach to the final. They faced Pohang Steelers in Tokyo, Japan but was beaten by Korean side 1–2 and finished the tournament as runner-up. Two months after that, Calderón was sacked on 13 January 2010. He was linked to Argentina national team to succeed Diego Maradona in 2010.

=== Al-Hilal ===
On 5 November 2010, Calderón was announced as the new head coach of Al-Hilal. Calderón would succeed Eric Gerets who departed to take charge of the Moroccan national team. He led the club to become 2010–11 league champions without any loss, and to the Crown Prince Cup title. He also led the club to the knockout stage of 2011 ACL but was defeated by his former club, Al-Ittihad in the Round of 16. Despite his achievements at the club, he was dismissed at the end of the season and on 19 July 2011 following the club's 3–0 defeat to league rivals Al Ittihad in the first leg of 2011 King Cup of Champions.

=== Baniyas ===
On 23 November 2011, he was appointed as UAE Pro-League side Baniyas SC's head coach. Baniyas was in 11th place before his arrival and was at the bottom of the league along with Sharjah but he saved the club from relegation and finished the league in 9th place. He also led the club to the final match of the UAE President's Cup but was defeated by Al-Jazira. Under his management, Baniyas reached the knockout stage of the AFC Champions League for the first time in the club's history but was defeated by Al-Hilal, Calderón's former side in the Round of 16. After this defeat, he announced that he would not renew his contract with Baniyas. He officially left the club on 30 May 2012. He was linked to Persepolis in June 2012 but that job went to Manuel José.

=== Bahrain national team ===
On 28 October 2012, Calderón was announced as head coach of Bahrain national football team to succeed Peter Taylor after the latter's dismissal. His first taste as manager came on 9 December 2012 in match with Yemen in 2012 West Asian Football Federation Championship. He was sacked on 13 August 2013.

=== Real Betis ===
On 19 January 2014, he was appointed as head coach of La Liga side Real Betis, replacing Juan Carlos Garrido. He separated after the end of season.

=== Al-Wasl ===
In October 2014, Calderón was named the head coach of Al-Wasl. In May 2016, he left the club by mutual consent.

=== Qatar SC ===
On 5 July 2017, he signed a two-year contract with Qatar SC. he was sacked on 22 November 2017.

=== Persepolis ===
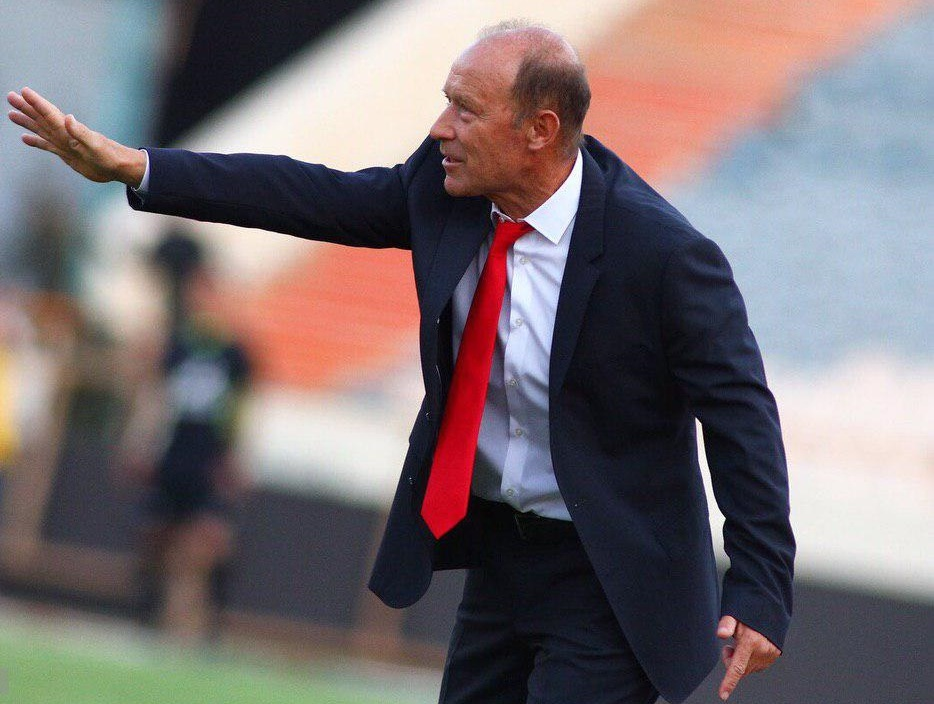
Calderón with Persepolis in 2019

On 1 July 2019, Calderón was appointed manager of reigning Persian Gulf Pro League and Iranian Hazfi Cup title-holders Persepolis, a post that was left vacant by the departure of Branko Ivanković, who left to manage Al-Ahli Saudi FC. On 12 January 2020, he resigned from his position as Persepolis coach due to financial troubles.

== Managerial statistics ==
As of 11 March 2022

Team	From	To	Record							
Team	From	To	G	W	D	L	GF	GA	±	Win %
SM Caen	July 1997	May 2000	118	43	39	36	158	131	+27	36.44
Lausanne Sports	July 2003	December 2003	15	5	5	5	23	22	+1	33.33
Saudi Arabia	November 2004	December 2005	20	9	4	7	26	22	+4	45.00
Oman	April 2007	June 2008	28	13	11	4	34	27	+7	46.43
Al-Ittihad	June 2008	January 2010	63	44	11	8	153	76	+77	69.84
Al-Hilal	December 2010	July 2011	37	25	9	3	73	31	+42	67.57
Baniyas	November 2011	May 2012	24	11	7	6	40	33	+7	45.83
Bahrain	October 2012	August 2013	21	9	8	4	22	16	+6	42.86
Real Betis	January 2014	May 2014	21	6	3	12	23	37	−14	28.57
Al-Wasl	October 2014	May 2016	19	7	6	6	32	31	+1	36.84
Qatar SC	September 2017	November 2017	9	1	1	7	8	21	−13	11.11
Persepolis	July 2019	January 2020	19	14	1	4	24	7	+17	73.68
Khor Fakkan	February 2022	May 2022	10	2	1	7	15	21	−6	20.00
Total			404	189	106	109	636	476	+160	46.78

== Honours ==
=== As a player ===
Real Betis

- Copa de la Liga runner-up: 1986

Paris Saint-Germain

- Ligue 1 runners-up: 1988–89

FC Sion

- Swiss Super League: 1991–92
- Swiss Cup: 1991

Argentina

- FIFA World Youth Championship: 1979
- FIFA World Cup runner-up: 1990

=== As a manager ===
Saudi Arabia

- Qualifying to the FIFA World Cup: 2006

Al-Ittihad

- AFC Champions League runner-up: 2009
- Saudi Professional League: 2008–09
- King Cup: 2010

Al-Hilal

- Saudi Professional League: 2010–11
- Crown Prince Cup: 2011
