= Stéphane Persol =

French footballer (born 1968)

Personal information
- Date of birth: 24 March 1968 (age 58)
- Place of birth: France
- Position: Defender

Youth career
- Morangis-Chilly
- 1983–1987: Paris Saint-Germain

Senior career*
Years	Team	Apps	(Gls)
1987–1991	Paris Saint-Germain	1	(0)
1988–1990	Paris Saint-Germain B		
- Corbeil-Essonnes
- CA L'Haÿ-les-Roses
- * Club domestic league appearances and goals

Stéphane Persol (born 24 March 1968) is a French former professional footballer who played as a defender.

== Club career ==
Persol made his debut for Paris Saint-Germain in a 3–0 Coupe de France loss against Sochaux on 5 April 1988. He played for the PSG reserve team for the following two seasons in the Division 3. On 17 May 1991, Persol played his second and final match for PSG, a 1–1 league draw against Brest.

== International career ==
Persol was a youth international for France.

== After football ==
Later in his life, Persol became the regional director of an environmental company in Plaisance-du-Touch.
