= Patrice Marquet =

French footballer (born 1966)

Personal information
- Date of birth: 23 October 1966 (age 60)
- Place of birth: Marseille, France
- Height: 1.78 m (5 ft 10 in)
- Position: Midfielder

Youth career
- Paris Saint-Germain

Senior career*
Years	Team	Apps	(Gls)
1984–1989	Paris Saint-Germain	23	(2)
1989	→ Bastia (loan)	12	(4)
1989–1991	Toulon	70	(8)
1992–1993	Bordeaux	40	(5)
1993	Lens	8	(0)
1993–1994	Le Havre	20	(2)
1994–1996	Cannes	38	(1)
1996–1997	Gueugnon	31	(2)
1997–1998	Toulon	23	(3)
Total		265	(27)
- * Club domestic league appearances and goals

Patrice Marquet (born 23 October 1966) is a French former professional footballer who played as a midfielder.
