= Alain Couriol =

French footballer (born 1958)

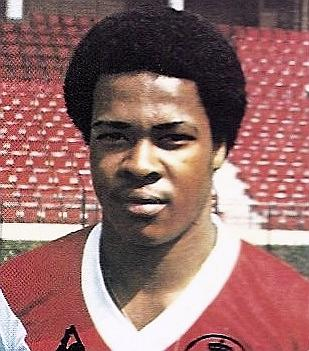
- Couriol in 1980

Personal information
- Date of birth: 24 October 1958 (age 67)
- Place of birth: Paris, France
- Height: 1.74 m (5 ft 8 1/2 in)
- Position: Striker

Youth career
- 1976–1978: INF Vichy

Senior career*
Years	Team	Apps	(Gls)
1978–1979	INF Vichy		
1979–1983	Monaco	118	(21)
1983–1989	Paris Saint-Germain	75	(9)
1989–1990	Toulon	15	(0)
1990–1991	Saint-Leu	24	(1)

International career
1980–1983	France	12	(2)
- * Club domestic league appearances and goals

Alain Couriol (born 24 October 1958) is a French former professional footballer who played as a striker.

== Club career ==
During his club career, Couriol played for INF Vichy (1978–1979), Monaco (1979–1983), Paris Saint-Germain (1983–1989), Toulon (1989–1990), and Saint-Leu (1990–1991).

== International career ==
He earned 12 caps and scored 2 goals for the France national football team, and played in the 1982 FIFA World Cup, where France finished fourth. He scored a goal in the third place match versus Poland in a 3–2 defeat in Alicante. His other goal for France came in March 1982 in a 4–0 win over Northern Ireland in Paris.

== Honours ==
Monaco

- Division 1: 1981–82

Paris Saint-Germain

- Division 1: 1985–86
