= Bernard Zénier =

French footballer (born 1957)

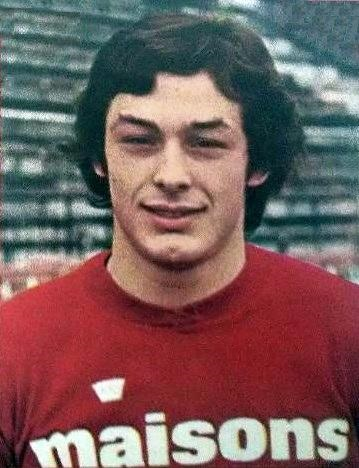
- Zénier in 1976

Personal information
- Date of birth: 21 August 1957 (age 69)
- Place of birth: Giraumont, France
- Position: Forward

Senior career*
Years	Team	Apps	(Gls)
1974–1978	Metz	89	(18)
1978–1983	Nancy	147	(53)
1983–1984	Bordeaux	25	(4)
1984–1986	Marseille	65	(18)
1986–1991	Metz	141	(37)

International career
1977–1987	France	5	(1)
- * Club domestic league appearances and goals

Bernard Zénier (born 21 August 1957) is a French former professional footballer who played as a forward.

== Career statistics ==
=== International ===
Appearances and goals by national team and year
National team	Year	Apps	Goals
France	1977	1	0
France	1978	–	
France	1979	–	
France	1980	–	
France	1981	–	
France	1982	2	1
France	1983	1	0
France	1984	–	
France	1985	–	
France	1986	–	
France	1987	1	0
Total		5	1

Scores and results list France's goal tally first, score column indicates score after each Zénier goal.

List of international goals scored by Bernard Zénier
No.	Date	Venue	Opponent	Score	Result	Competition
1	24 March 1982	Parc des Princes, Paris, France	Northern Ireland	1–0	4–0	Friendly

== Honours ==
Bordeaux

- Division 1: 1984

Metz

- Coupe de France: 1988

Individual

- Division 1 top goalscorer: 1986–87
