= Thierry Rabat =

French footballer (born 1962)

Personal information
- Date of birth: 30 May 1962 (age 64)
- Place of birth: Cherbourg
- Position: Defender

Senior career*
Years	Team	Apps	(Gls)
1981–1985	SC Toulon		
1985–1986	Limoges FC		
1986–1990	Paris Saint-Germain		
1988–1989	→ RC Lens		
1990–1993	SC Toulon		
1993–1995	FC Martigues		
1995–1997	Lille OSC		
1997–1998	Troyes AC		
1998–1999	Sporting Toulon Var		
- * Club domestic league appearances and goals

Thierry Rabat (born 30 May 1962) is a retired French football defender.
