= Pierre Reynaud =

French footballer (born 1968)

Personal information
- Date of birth: 8 January 1968 (age 58)
- Place of birth: Houilles, France
- Positions: Defender; midfielder

Youth career
- 1985–1986: AS Chatou

Senior career*
Years	Team	Apps	(Gls)
1986–1994	Paris Saint-Germain	115	(4)
1994–1997	Toulouse	42	(1)
Total		157	(5)

International career
	France B	1	(0)
- * Club domestic league appearances and goals

Pierre Reynaud (born 9 January 1968) is a French former professional footballer who played as a defender and midfielder. As of 2021, he is a scout for the Paris Saint-Germain Academy.

== Club career ==
Reynaud made 125 appearances for Paris Saint-Germain, the club at which he stayed from 1986 to 1994. He joined Toulouse for the final three years of his career.

== International career ==
Reynaud made one appearance for the France B team in his career.

== Post-playing career ==
Reynaud became a scout for the Paris Saint-Germain Academy in 2005.

Following a controversy about the racial profiling of scouted players from 2013 to 2018, Reynaud was fined €5,000 by the LFP.

== Honours ==
Paris Saint-Germain

- Division 1: 1993–94
- Coupe de France: 1992–93
