= Oumar Sène =

Senegalese footballer

Personal information
- Date of birth: 23 October 1959 (age 67)
- Place of birth: Dakar, Senegal
- Height: 1.81 m (5 ft 11 in)
- Position: Midfielder

Senior career*
Years	Team	Apps	(Gls)
1978–1980	US Gorée		
1981–1985	Laval	109	(17)
1985–1992	Paris Saint-Germain	174	(15)

International career
1982–1992	Senegal		
- * Club domestic league appearances and goals

Oumar Sène (born 23 October 1959) is a Senegalese former professional footballer who played as a midfielder.

== Career ==
Sène was born in Dakar, Senegal. He won the Senegal Premier League 1980 with US Gorée. Later he played 197 times for French side Paris Saint-Germain.

== Personal life ==
His son Saër is also a professional footballer.
