= Jean-François Charbonnier =

French footballer (1959–2020)

Personal information
- Date of birth: 18 January 1959
- Place of birth: Lyon, France
- Date of death: 7 December 2020 (aged 61)
- Height: 1.78 m (5 ft 10 in)
- Positions: Defender; midfielder

Senior career*
Years	Team	Apps	(Gls)
1977–1978	Saint-Priest		
1978–1984	Reims		
1984–1986	Paris Saint-Germain		
1986–1987	Cannes		
1987–1991	Paris Saint-Germain		
1991–1997	Paris FC		

Managerial career
- 1993–1995: Paris FC U17
- 1995–2000: Paris FC (joint)
- 2000–2003: Créteil B
- 2004–2008: GOAL FC
- 2008–2011: FC Corbas
- 2011–2012: FC Vaulx-en-Velin
- 2012–2014: AS Craponne
- * Club domestic league appearances and goals

Jean-François Charbonnier (18 January 1959 – 7 December 2020) was a French footballer who played as a defender and as a midfielder.

== Honours ==
Paris Saint-Germain

- French Division 1: 1985–86
- Coupe de France runner-up: 1984–85
