= Jules Bocandé =

Senegalese footballer (1958–2012)

Personal information
- Full name: Jules François Bertrand Bocandé
- Date of birth: 25 November 1958
- Place of birth: Ziguinchor, Senegal
- Date of death: 7 May 2012 (aged 53)
- Place of death: Metz, France
- Height: 1.86 m (6 ft 1 in)
- Position: Striker

Youth career
- Entente Ziguinchor

Senior career*
Years	Team	Apps	(Gls)
1978–1980	Casa Sport	58	(9)
1980–1982	RUS Tournaisienne	68	(20)
1982–1984	Seraing	58	(20)
1984–1986	Metz	61	(33)
1986–1987	Paris Saint-Germain	38	(6)
1987–1991	Nice	98	(25)
1991–1992	Lens	26	(5)
1992–1993	Eendracht Aalst	6	(3)
Total		413	(121)

International career
1979–1993	Senegal	73	(20)

Managerial career
- 1994–1995: Senegal
- 1999–2000: Steve Biko FC
- * Club domestic league appearances and goals

Jules François Bocandé (25 November 1958 – 7 May 2012) was a Senegalese professional footballer who played as a striker. Bocandé is regarded as one of West Africa's best footballers of all time and was named an African Football Legend by CAF in 2009.

== Club career ==
Bocandé was one of the first Senegalese footballers in France and was Ligue 1's top goalscorer in the 1985–86 season with 23 goals.

== International career ==
Jules Bocandé participated with the Senegal national team in three editions of Africa Cup of Nations in 1986, 1990 and 1992.

== Personal life and death ==
He was the father of former FC Metz professional player Daniel Bocandé. He died in Metz at the age of 53 during an operation.
