= Amara Simba =

French-Senegalese footballer (born 1961)

Personal information
- Full name: Amara Simba
- Date of birth: December 23, 1961 (age 64)
- Place of birth: Dakar, Senegal
- Position: Forward

Youth career
- 1975–1981: Jeanne d’Arc
- 1981–1983: FCR Houdanaise

Senior career*
Years	Team	Apps	(Gls)
1983–1986	Versailles		
1986–1993	Paris Saint-Germain	126	(19)
1990–1991	→ Cannes (loan)	28	(10)
1993–1994	Monaco	32	(4)
1994–1995	Caen	37	(12)
1995–1996	Lille	39	(4)
1996–1998	León		
1998–2000	Leyton Orient	37	(13)
2000	Kingstonian	8	(6)
2000	→ Kingstonian (loan)	9	(3)
2000	St. Albans City	5	(2)
2000	Kettering Town	2	(0)
2001	St. Albans City	3	(1)
2001	Barnet	0	(0)
2001–2002	Billericay Town	13	(4)
2002	Clacton Town		

International career
1991–1992	France	3	(2)
- * Club domestic league appearances and goals

Amara Simba (born 23 December 1961) is a retired French professional footballer who played as a forward.

== Club career ==
During his career, Simba played for Jeanne d'Arc, FCR Houdanaise, Versailles, Paris Saint-Germain, Cannes, Monaco, Caen and Lille in France, León in Mexico and Leyton Orient, Kingstonian, Kettering Town, Barnet, St. Albans City, Billericay Town and Clacton Town in England.

Simba's move to Leyton Orient came about as a result of his training with the club to keep fit while on holiday in London.

He was awarded most beautiful goal in the French Division in 1992-93 for a goal in which he received the ball, controlled it with his chest and finished it off with a bicycle kick.

== International career ==
Simba was also selected to play for the France national team on three occasions, by then manager Michel Platini. He scored two goals, but injury prevented his participation in Euro 92 and his international career came to an end.

== Honours ==
=== Paris Saint-Germain ===
- Coupe de France: 1992-93
