= Gérard Biguet =

French football referee (1946–2026)

- Born: 16 June 1946; Briey, France
- Died: 25 April 2026 (aged 79)

Domestic
Years	League	Role
1980–1992	French First Division	Referee

International
Years	League	Role
1982–1992	FIFA-listed	Referee

Gérard Biguet (16 June 1946 – 25 April 2026) was a French football referee, who refereed one match at the 1992 UEFA European Football Championship: CIS versus Germany.

Biguet is known to have served as a FIFA referee during the period from 1982 to 1992. Biguet officiated at the 1988 Olympic tournament in Seoul, the 1983 FIFA World Youth Championship, qualifying matches for the Euro 1984, and Euro 1992 tournaments, and qualifying matches for the 1990 World Cup.

He also worked as a futsal referee, officiating at the 1989 FIFA Futsal World Championship.

Biguet died on 25 April 2026, at the age of 79.
