= Christian Perez (footballer, born 1963) =

French footballer

Personal information
- Date of birth: 13 May 1963 (age 63)
- Place of birth: Marseille, France
- Height: 1.68 m (5 ft 6 in)
- Positions: Forward; attacking midfielder

Senior career*
Years	Team	Apps	(Gls)
1980–1987	Nîmes	188	(57)
1987–1989	Montpellier	32	(11)
1988–1989	→ Paris Saint-Germain (loan)	35	(7)
1989–1992	Paris Saint-Germain	92	(15)
1992–1994	Monaco	49	(6)
1994–1995	Lille	21	(0)
1995–1996	Nîmes	14	(1)
1996–1997	Shanghai Shenhua	16	(2)
Total		447	(99)

International career
1988–1992	France	22	(2)
- * Club domestic league appearances and goals

Christian Perez (born 13 May 1963) is a French former professional footballer who played as a forward first and later as an attacking midfielder.

== Club career ==
Born in Marseille, Bouches-du-Rhône, Perez amassed Ligue 1 totals of 268 games and 44 goals over the course of 11 seasons, representing Nîmes (making his debut in the competition at the age of 16, he went on to appear for the club in all three major levels of French football), Montpellier, Paris Saint-Germain, Monaco and Lille.

Perez retired in 1997 at 34, after two years in the Chinese Super League with Shanghai Shenhua FC.

== International career ==
Perez earned the first of his 22 caps for the France national team on 19 November 1988, starting and scoring in a 3–2 away defeat against Yugoslavia for the 1990 FIFA World Cup qualifiers. Selected for the UEFA Euro 1992 finals by coach Michel Platini, he played three incomplete games in an eventual group exit in Sweden.

== Honours ==
Nîmes

- Coupe de France runner-up: 1995–96
