= Christel =

Given name list

- Language: German

Christel is a given name of German origin. Notable people with this given name include:

- Christel Augenstein (born 1949), German politician
- Christel Bertens (born 1983), Dutch bobsledder and athlete
- Christel Haeck (born 1948), politician in Ontario, Canada
- Christel Happach-Kasan (born 1950), German politician
- Christel Khalil (born 1987), Emmy Award-nominated American actress
- Christel Kimbembe (born 1982), Congolese football defender
- Christel Lau (born 1944), German field hockey player
- Christel Marott (1919–1992), Danish Illustrator and Sculptorist
- Christel Meinel (born 1957), former East German cross country skier
- Christel Schaldemose (born 1967), member of the European Parliament
- Christel Takigawa (born 1977), Japanese television presenter
- Christel Wegner (born 1947), German communist politician

== See also ==
- Christl
- Christal
- Christol
