= Hamadou =

Hamadou is a Francophonic-orthography variant of the Islamic name Hamad, commonly used in Africa. Notable people with the name include:

== Given name ==
- Hamadou Derra (born 1985), Burkinabé football midfielder
- Hamadou Djibo Issaka (born 1977), Nigerian athlete
- Hamadou Karamoko (born 1995), French football defender
- Hamadou Moustapha (born 1945), Cameroonian politician

== Surname ==
- Barkat Gourad Hamadou (born 1930), Prime Minister of Djibouti from 1978 to 2001
- Pape Hamadou N'Diaye (born 1977), Senegalese football player
