= Nerini =

Nerini is a surname. Notable people with the surname include:

- Evaristo Garbani-Nerini, Swiss politician
- Felice Maria Nerini, Italian writer and historian
- Pierre Nerini

== See also ==
- Neri
- Nerino
- Nerina
