= Augenstein =

Augenstein is a German surname. Notable people with the surname include:

- Bruno Augenstein (1923–2005), German mathematician and physicist
- Bryan Augenstein (born 1986), American baseball player
- Christel Augenstein (born 1949), German politician
- Hans-Heinz Augenstein (1921–1944), German World War II flying ace
