= André Cluytens discography =

The Belgian-born French conductor André Cluytens (1905–1967) was a prolific recording artist. His recording career ran from May 1943 (Strauss and Laparra) to December 1965 (Berlioz' L'enfance du Christ). Many of Cluytens recordings have since been re-issued.

This discography uses information from sources including editions of The Gramophone Catalogue, the CHARM Discography, D Kern Holoman's study of the Société des Concerts du Conservatoire, the website of Testament Records, and the Erik Baeck study.

This list consists primarily of studio recordings; some recordings of live concerts have been released, and details of these are given separately.

== Recordings, listed alphabetically by composer ==
- CPE Bach
  - Cello Concerto No. 3 in A major (Paris Conservatoire Orchestra, André Navarra)
- Beethoven
  - Prometheus overture, op. 43 (Paris Conservatoire Orchestra)
  - Symphonies 1, 2, 3, 4, 5, 6, 7, 8, 9 (Berlin Philharmonic Orchestra)
  - Overtures: Fidelio, Leonora No 3, Prometheus, Ruins of Athens, Coriolan, Egmont (Berlin Philharmonic Orchestra)
  - Piano Concerto No. 3 in C minor, op. 37 (Paris Conservatoire Orchestra, Emil Gilels; Berlin Philharmonic Orchestra)
  - Piano Concerto No. 4 in G major, op. 58 (Philharmonia Orchestra)
- Berlioz
  - L'Enfance du Christ (Paris Conservatoire Orchestra)
  - Symphonie fantastique, Op.14 (Orchestre National de la Radiodiffusion Française, Berlin Philharmonic, Philharmonia Orchestra)
  - Roméo et Juliette, Op.17 – excerpts (Orchestre du Théâtre National de l'Opéra)
  - La Damnation de Faust – abridged (Orchestre du Théâtre National de l'Opéra)
  - Béatrice et Bénédict – overture; Benvenuto Cellini – overture (Orchestre National de la Radiodiffusion Française)
- Bizet
  - Carmen (Paris Opéra Comique)
  - L'Arlésienne – Suites Nos. 1 & 2 (Orchestre National de la Radiodiffusion Française)
  - Patrie Overture, Op.19 (Orchestre National de la Radiodiffusion Française)
  - Symphonie in C (Orchestre National de la Radiodiffusion Française)
  - La jolie fille de Perth – Suite (Orchestre National de la Radiodiffusion Française)
  - Les pêcheurs de perles (Paris Opéra Comique)
  - L'Arlésienne Suites 1–2; Carmen Suite (Paris Conservatoire Orchestra)
- Bondeville
  - Gaultier-Garguille – poème symphonique (Orchestre National de la Radiodiffusion Française)
  - Madame Bovary – Tableaux 5 and 7 (Paris Opéra-Comique)
- Borodin
  - Dans les Steppes de l'Asie centrale (Paris Conservatoire Orchestra)
  - Polovtsian Dances from Prince Igor (Paris Conservatoire Orchestra)
- Chopin
  - Andante Spianato and Grande Polonaise Brillante in E-flat (Paris Conservatoire Orchestra, Jeanne-Marie Darré)
  - Piano Concerto No. 2 in F Minor (Paris Conservatoire Orchestra, Marguerite Long)
- Debussy
  - Danses: Sacrée et Profane, pour la Harpe Chromatique (Paris Conservatoire Orchestra, Annie Challan)
  - Jeux (Paris Conservatoire Orchestra)
  - Images (Paris Conservatoire Orchestra)
  - Nocturnes (Paris Conservatoire Orchestra)
  - Pelléas et Mélisande (Orchestre National de France)
  - La Boîte à joujoux (orch André Caplet) (Orchestre National de la Radiodiffusion Française)
  - Children's Corner Suite (orch André Caplet) (Orchestre National de la Radiodiffusion Française)
  - Le Martyre de Saint Sébastien (Orchestre National de la Radiodiffusion Française)
- Delage
  - Quatre poèmes Hindous (Ensemble instrumental)
  - Trois chants de la jungle (Ensemble instrumental)
- Delibes
  - Suites from Sylvia and Coppélia (Orchestre du Théâtre National de l'Opéra)
- Falla
  - El sombrero de tres picos – Dances (Paris Conservatoire Orchestra)
- Fauré
  - Ballade, Piano and Orchestra in F-sharp Major, op. 19 (Paris Conservatoire Orchestra, Marguerite Long)
  - Requiem, op. 48 (Paris Conservatoire Orchestra)
- Franck
  - Symphony in D minor (Orchestre National de la Radiodiffusion Française)
  - Le chasseur maudit (Paris Conservatoire Orchestra, Orchestre nationale de Belgique)
  - Rédemption – Poème symphonique (Paris Conservatoire Orchestra, Orchestre nationale de Belgique)
  - Les Djinns (Orchestre nationale de Belgique)
  - Psyché (Paris Conservatoire Orchestra)
  - Variations symphoniques (Paris Conservatoire Orchestra, Aldo Ciccolini)
- Gershwin
  - An American in Paris (Paris Conservatoire Orchestra)
- Gounod
  - Faust (Opéra de Paris) (two complete recordings)
  - Mireille (Paris Conservatoire Orchestra)
- Haydn
  - Symphony No. 45 in F-sharp minor (Paris Conservatoire Orchestra)
  - Symphony No. 57 (Paris Conservatoire Orchestra)
  - Symphony No. 102 in B-flat major (Paris Conservatoire Orchestra)
  - Symphony No. 104 (Paris Conservatoire Orchestra)
- Hérold
  - Le pré-aux-clercs – overture (Paris Opéra-Comique)
- Humperdinck
  - Hänsel und Gretel (Wiener Philharmoniker)
- d'Indy
  - Symphony on a French Mountain Air, Op.25 (Paris Conservatoire Orchestra, Aldo Ciccolini)
- Lalo
  - Le roi d’Ys (Orchestre National de la Radiodiffusion Française)
  - Symphonie espagnole, op. 21 (Le grand orchestre symphonique Columbia)
- Laparra
  - Habanera: Entracte ‘Una mala noche’; Prelude to Act III (Paris Conservatoire Orchestra)
- Liszt
  - Les Préludes, S97 (Berliner Philharmoniker)
- Massenet
  - Scènes alsaciennes (Suite No. 7) (Paris Opéra-Comique)
  - Scènes pittoresques (Suite No. 4) (Paris Opéra-Comique)
  - Les Erinnyes – Suite (Orchestre du Théâtre National de l'Opéra)
- Menotti
  - Piano Concerto in F (Paris Conservatoire Orchestra, Yuri Boukoff)
- Mozart
  - Don Giovanni overture (Paris Conservatoire Orchestra)
  - arias from Die Entführung aus dem Serail, Idomeneo, Così fan tutte, Don Giovanni, La Clemenza de Tito, Die Zauberflöte, Concert aria, K. 420, Per pietà non ricercate (Paris Conservatoire Orchestra, Nicolai Gedda)
  - arias from Così fan tutte, Le Nozze di Figaro, Concert arias, "Bella mia fiamma", K. 528, "Ah! se in ciel", K. 538 (Paris Conservatoire Orchestra, Teresa Stich-Randall)
- Mussorgsky
  - Khovantchina: Introduction (Paris Conservatoire Orchestra)
  - Boris Godunov (Paris Conservatoire Orchestra)
  - Une Nuit sur le Mont Chauve (Philharmonia Orchestra)
- Mussorgsky / Ravel:
  - Pictures at an Exhibition (Paris Conservatoire Orchestra)
- Nigg
  - Piano Concerto (Orchestre National de la Radiodiffusion Française, Pierre Barbizet)
- Offenbach
  - Les Contes d'Hoffmann (Opéra-Comique, Paris)
  - Les Contes d'Hoffmann (Paris Conservatoire Orchestra)
- Pierné
  - Concertstück, op. 39 (Paris Conservatoire Orchestra, Lily Laskine)
- Poulenc
  - Les mamelles de Tirésias (Opéra-Comique, Paris)
- Prokofiev
  - Piano Concerto No. 3 in C Major, op. 26 (Paris Conservatoire Orchestra, Samson François)
- Rachmaninov
  - Piano Concerto No. 2 (Paris Conservatoire Orchestra, Gabriel Tacchino)
  - Piano Concerto No. 3 in D Minor, op. 30 (Paris Conservatoire Orchestra, Emil Gilels)
- Ravel
  - Boléro (Paris Conservatoire Orchestra)
  - Rapsodie espagnole (Paris Conservatoire Orchestra)
  - Rapsodie espagnole (Orchestre National De La Radiodiffusion Française, 1951 (Pathé 33 DT 1005)
  - La Valse (Paris Conservatoire Orchestra)
  - La Valse (Orchestre National De La Radiodiffusion Française, 1951 (Pathé 33 DT 1005)
  - Valses nobles et sentimentales (Paris Conservatoire Orchestra, Orchestre National de la Radiodiffusion Française)
  - Le Tombeau de Couperin (Paris Conservatoire Orchestra, Orchestre National de la Radiodiffusion Française)
  - Menuet antique (Paris Conservatoire Orchestra, Orchestre National de la Radiodiffusion Française)
  - Alborada del gracioso (Paris Conservatoire Orchestra, Orchestre National de la Radiodiffusion Française)
  - Une Barque sur l'océan (Paris Conservatoire Orchestra, Orchestre National de la Radiodiffusion Française)
  - Pavane pour une infante défunte (Paris Conservatoire Orchestra)
  - Daphnis et Chloé (complete) (Paris Conservatoire Orchestra)
  - L'heure espagnole (Paris Opéra-Comique)
  - Ma Mère l'oye suite (Paris Conservatoire Orchestra)
  - Piano Concerto in D Major for the Left Hand (Paris Conservatoire Orchestra, Samson François)
  - Piano Concerto in G (Paris Conservatoire Orchestra, Samson François)
  - Daphnis et Chloé – Suites Nos. 1 & 2 (Orchestre National de la Radiodiffusion Française)
- Rimsky-Korsakov
  - La Grande Pâque russe, op. 36 (Paris Conservatoire Orchestra, Philharmonia Orchestra)
  - Capriccio espagnol, op. 34 (Paris Conservatoire Orchestra, Pierre Nerini)
  - Schéhérazade, op. 35 (Orchestre National de la Radiodiffusion Française)
- Roussel
  - Le festin de l'araignée (Ballet-Pantomime) (Paris Conservatoire Orchestra)
  - Bacchus et Ariane – Suite, Op.43 (Paris Conservatoire Orchestra)
  - Sinfonietta for String Orchestra, Op.52 (Paris Conservatoire Orchestra)
  - Symphony No.3 in G minor, Op.42 (Paris Conservatoire Orchestra)
  - Symphony No.4 in A, Op.53 (Paris Conservatoire Orchestra)
- Saint-Saëns
  - Overture to La Princesse Jaune, op. 30 (Paris Conservatoire Orchestra)
  - Piano Concerto No. 2 in G Minor, op. 22 (Paris Conservatoire Orchestra, Emil Gilels)
  - Symphony No.3 in C minor, Op.78 (Paris Conservatoire Orchestra)
- Schubert
  - Symphony No. 8 in B Minor "Unfinished" (Paris Conservatoire Orchestra, Berlin Philharmonic Orchestra)
- Schumann
  - Manfred, Op.115, Overture (Berlin Philharmonic Orchestra)
  - Symphony No. 3 in E-flat major, op. 97 (Berlin Philharmonic Orchestra)
  - Symphony No. 4 in D minor, op. 120 (Orchestre National de la Radiodiffusion Française)
  - Cello Concerto in D minor, op 129 (Orchestre Colonne, André Navarra)
- Shostakovitch
  - Piano Concertos 1 and 2 (Orchestre National de la Radiodiffusion Française, Dmitri Shostakovitch)
  - Symphony No. 11 in G minor, op. 103 '1905' (Orchestre National de la Radiodiffusion Française)
- Smetana
  - Má Vlast – Vltava (The Moldau) and Z ceských luhu a háju (From Bohemia's meadows and forests) (Wiener Philharmoniker)
- Strauss
  - Burlesque, piano and orchestra (Paris Conservatoire Orchestra, Marcelle Meyer)
  - Don Juan, op. 20 (Wiener Philharmoniker)
  - Feuersnot, op. 50 – Love scene (Wiener Philharmoniker)
- Stravinsky
  - Perséphone (Paris Conservatoire Orchestra)
  - Le Rossignol (French Radio Chorus & Orchestra)
- Tchaikovsky
  - Piano Concerto No. 1 in B-flat Minor, op. 23 (Paris Conservatoire Orchestra, Aldo Ciccolini)
- Wagner
  - Götterdämmerung – Siegfried's Funeral March (Orchestre du Théâtre National de l'Opéra)
  - Lohengrin – Acts 1 & 3 Vorspiel (Orchestre du Théâtre National de l'Opéra)
  - Siegfried – Waldweben (Orchestre du Théâtre National de l'Opéra)
  - Tannhäuser – overture (Orchestre du Théâtre National de l'Opéra)
- Weber
  - Oberon – overture (Paris Opéra-Comique)
- Operatic arias by Thomas, Saint-Saëns, Gluck, Berlioz (Paris Opéra-Comique, Solange Michel)
- Operatic arias by Charpentier G, Bizet, Massenet, Puccini, Gounod (Paris Opéra-Comique, Martha Angelici)
- Operatic arias by Wagner, Massenet, Verdi, Mascagni, Saint-Saëns, Gluck (Orchestre du Théâtre National de l'Opéra, Rita Gorr)
- Operatic arias by Massenet, Gounod, Donizetti (Orchestre du Théâtre National de l'Opéra, Michel Dens)
- Operatic arias by Puccini, Bizet, Massenet (Paris Opéra-Comique, Raoul Jobin)

== Radio / live subsequently re-issued commercially ==
- Bach
  - Violin Concerto in E major (New York Philharmonic, Johanna Martzy)
- Berlioz
  - Symphonie fantastique, Op.14 (Czech Philharmonic Orchestra)
- Brahms
  - Piano Concerto No 2 in Bb Major, Op. 83 (Orchestra of Radio Turin, Arthur Rubinstein)
- Debussy
  - L’Enfant Prodigue (Orchestra of Radio Turin)
- Einem
  - Four episodes from 'Turandot' (Vienna Symphony Orchestra)
- Honegger
  - Symphony No 3 ‘Liturgique’ (Orchestra of Radio Turin)
- Mahler
  - Lieder eines fahrenden Gesellen (Philharmonia Orchestra, Christa Ludwig)
- Roussel
  - Bacchus et Ariane Suite No 2 (Vienna Symphony Orchestra)
- Stravinsky
  - Firebird Suite (Orchestra of Radio Turin), (Vienna Symphony Orchestra)
- Wagner
  - Lohengrin (Chor and Orchester der Bayreuther Festspiele) 1958
  - Die Meistersinger von Nürnberg (Chor and Orchester der Bayreuther Festspiele) 1957
  - Tannhäuser (Chor and Orchester der Bayreuther Festspiele) 1955
  - Tristan und Isolde (Vienna State Opera)

== Video/DVD ==
- Mussorgsky / Ravel:
  - Pictures at an Exhibition (Orchestre National de la Radiodiffusion Française)
- Ravel
  - Daphnis et Chloé – Suite No. 2 (Orchestre National de la Radiodiffusion Française)
