= Gösta Schwarck =

Danish composer and businessman

Doctor of Music Gösta Schwarck
- Born: Gösta Ernst Poul Schwarck; September 14, 1915; Ahlbeck, Germany
- Died: March 11, 2012 (aged 96); Herlev, Copenhagen, Denmark
- Resting place: Søndermark Cemetery, Copenhagen, Denmark
- Occupations: Impresario, Pianist, Composer, Distributor, Manufacturer, conductor
- Years active: 1933–2010
- Organization(s): International Concert Management, Dr. Gösta Schwarck International, The Miss Denmark Organizationl, Maxford Publishing
- Agent(s): Northern Military Publishing Scandinavian and Borup Music Publishing, Polyphon, Tempo Music Publishing, Copenhagen Music Publishing
- Spouse: Assia Zlatkowa
- Relatives: Christel

Gösta Ernst Poul Schwarck (1915–2012) was a Danish composer and businessman. He was mostly known for his activities as impresario for which he was eventually conferred upon as Doctor of Music.

Gösta Schwarck was born into an artist family of Danish and German descent on September 14, 1915 in North East Germany. His father was a conductor Ernst Poul Schwarck and his mother an opera singer Marguerite Brian-Schwarck.

He was active since the early 1930s, first as a composer and later as a sales manager as well as touring choir leader. He became self-employed at an early age with an own sales organization. In the early 1950s and throughout the decade he organised Denmark's first national beauty pageants and became the official national representation of the Miss Denmark, Miss World and Miss Europe. From 1957 onwards he was also an international impresario for classical musical events through his company International Concert Management, later to be known as Dr. Gösta Schwarck International Ltd.

== Early years ==
In the early years he led a twin career as composer and sales manager for the Hother Hellenberg perfume company. He published records and music scores in collaboration with Sven Rye, Gull-Maj Norin, Greta Keller and others.

== 1946–1947 military service ==
During the serving of the Danish military service in the aftermath of World War II he created a soldier's singing choir with which he toured in Denmark and abroad. The choir performed in the State Radio and published a record of their own. HM Frederik IX, King of Denmark, expressed his gratitude for the actions as it helped restore morale in post-war Europe.

In contemporary concerts organized by Gösta Schwarck Ib Schønberg appeared as well as a young teenager Bent Fabricius Bjerre, who played along with his newly established orchestra. Later in life, Gösta Schwarck was often heard referring to his experience from his time as a soldier as the learning period during which the seeds were laid out for his later work as impresario.

== 1947–1998 The Gösta Schwarck Sales Organization ==
Starting in 1946, he was self-employed and set up a nationwide sales organization (Salgsorganisationen Gösta Schwarck) based on Adelgade 18 and later Vesterbrogade 27. With the motto "a new article every week" the start-up provided Denmark with cosmetics, health, clothing, new inventions and imports. Items included The Invisible Comb, Grand Massette and Denmark's first Bikini bathing suit designed by his sister and artist Christel. The first Miss Denmark pageants and various types of Variety Shows organized by Gösta Schwarck during this time was used as a promotional platform for his company's products.

== 1954–1960 beauty pageants ==
During a business lunch at Dyrehavsbakken he became acquainted with Albert V. Unruh, a theatre director who owned a playhouse that suffered from a strongly declining turnover. With Gösta Schwarck helping with marketing, ideas, sales and promotion, long queues of visitors were seen only a few days later, in front of the theater, which would otherwise have gone bankrupt. In this period Gösta Schwarck organised national beauty pageants and his organisation was the Danish representative of Miss Europe, Miss World and Miss Universe. In 1958 MGM actor Errol Flynn accepted an invitation to come from the US and participate in the panel of judges - during this he discovered Gösta Schwarck's musical talent and promoted him to his own agents. According to Gösta Schwarck's own records he was offered career opportunities in Hollywood that he turned down.

== 1957–2010 concert management ==
After a serious car accident in Hamburg in 1954 Gösta Schwarck focused on classical music. A dedicated concert management organisation was established and the profits from his cosmetics company was funneled directly into making it possible for some of the greatest classical contemporary musicians to come to a small country like Denmark. Alexander Borovsky, Nikita Magaloff, Shura Cherkassky, Yury Boukoff, Walter Klien, Jakob Gimpel, Sviatoslav Richter, Adam Harasiewicz, Grigory Sokolov and others sat at the grand pianos in Danish concert halls and Victor Schiøler wrote a long, open letter where he praised the actions by Gösta Schwarck with the introductory words "The Danish music scene owes much to you."

At the age of 40 years he refined his piano skills with an education at The Royal Danish Academy of Music and graduated as a concert pianist under the supervision of Herman D. Koppel. His musical studies were carried out alongside running his cosmetics company, newly established concert management and taking care of a growing family.

In later years he moved away from the piano art and continued to move to other art forms to organize nationwide tours for the Vienna Boys' Choir, Vlach and Janacek Quartet, Carlo Zecchi, Kyung-Wha Chung, Anne-Sophie Mutter, Alexander Lazarev and others and invited famous voices as Boris Christov Christa Ludwig Mirella Freni, Teresa Berganza, Ghena Dimitrova and others to Denmark. In 1975 he married the young Bulgarian pianist Assia Zlatkowa.

In the mid-1980s, Gösta Schwarck was the first in Denmark to get the Soviet Bolshoi Opera to Denmark.

Within the same year he announced that he would set up Verdi's Aida with 264 participants at the Royal Danish Theatre in Copenhagen.

In 1988, he became the first in Denmark - and Scandinavia - to persuade the late Luciano Pavarotti to visit the capital with the Royal Danish Orchestra as the orchestra. After experiencing several issues with the financing, he mortgaged his own house and put all of his personal belongings at risk to be able to make the event happen.

After he had paved the way and shown that such spectacular events were possible in Denmark, the national Radio of Denmark and other large organisations followed in his footsteps years later with similar events.

Gösta Schwarck was responsible for organizing thousands of unique cultural events, both within and outside of Denmark. All of this he achieved in parallel with the running of his wholesale company "Salgsorganisationen Gösta Schwarck" which later became the mail order company "Euro Pharma ApS" which all helped finance the cultural events. During the first 20–30 years, he set their own personal finances over the track and posted their own money into the music, only driven by the desire to create unprecedented and unparalleled events.

=== 1970–2008 international honors ===
Through the years he was shown honor with orders, medals and governmental acknowledgements from Germany, France, USA, Russia, the Soviet Union, the Czech Republic, Bulgaria, Israel and Hungary. In 1977, he was conferred upon with a degree of Honorary Doctor from the Chicago Conservatory. The greatest honor came in 2008 when he was awarded the Order of Saints Cyril and Methodius by the Bulgarian president - The highest honor that can be assigned by the head of state in recognition of special efforts in art and science. He was never granted similar honors in his home country, despite his contributions to Denmark.

== Compositions ==
- Elegy (1971)
- Golden Rhapsody (1955)
- Small Pearl (1950)
- We are Denmark, we are Soldiers (1946)
- A Single Kiss (1942)
- A Scent of Springtime (1938)
- Goodbye (1937)
- Without Words (1936)
- Life's Melody (1936)
