= Neri (surname) =

Origin
- Language: Italian
- Derivation: Short form of Guarneri, Maineri, Raineri
- Meaning: "counsel-army", "protection-army"
- Region of origin: Italy

Other names
- Variant forms: Neretti, Neritti, Nerini, Neroni, Nerucci, Nieri, Nerozzi, Neri and Néri

Neri is a common surname from Italy. It can also be found in Latin America and the United States, particularly among those of Italian descent.

== Etymology and history ==
During the 6th century, Germanic tribes such as the Longobards invaded Italy and left a large influence on the peninsula's given names, especially in northern regions such as Lombardy and Emilia-Romagna. Among the names that entered included Warinhari and Raginhari, which morphed into the surnames Guarneri and Raineri via influence from local Gallo-Italic languages. Both of these names contained the element -hari, a term which meant "army" in Germanic languages.

The most common process for forming pet names in Italy was aphaeresis, a sound change where the initial portion of a word was removed (i.e. Lorenzo → Enzo). When these surnames underwent this process, it resulted in the name Neri.

Due to the popularity of the Roman Catholic saint Philip Neri, various families adopted Neri as a devotional surname, most of whom were concentrated in Latin America.

== Variations ==
A sound change that occurred in Tuscan was the change from a monophthong [ɛ] to a diphthong [jɛ] (transcribed "ie"). This sound was present in the traditional pronunciation of Neri, /ˈnɛ.ri/. As a result, a variant of this surname found in Tuscany and Emilia-Romagna is Nieri.

Surnames with the similar etymology include Neretti, Neritti, Nerini, Neroni, Nerucci, Nerozzi, and Néri.

== People ==
- Adelaide Neri (1940–2018), Brazilian teacher and politician
- Alain Néri (born 1942), French politician
- Albert J. Neri (1952–2011), American political news correspondent, pundit, and political analyst
- Alessandra Neri (born 1988), Italian racing driver
- Ana Néri (1814–1880), Brazilian nurse and war heroine
- Antonio Neri (chemist) (1576–c. 1614), Italian glass maker
- Fernando Neri (born 1969), Argentinian footballer
- Francesca Neri (born 1954), Italian actress
- Francisco Valmerino Neri (born 1976), known as "Neri", Brazilian footballer
- Giacomo Neri (1916–2010), Italian professional football player and coach
- Giancarlo Neri, Italian sculptor
- Giulio Neri (1909-1958), Italian operatic bass
- Greg Neri, pen name G. Neri, American author
- Krizza Neri (born 1995), Filipina singer
- Luigi Delneri (born 1950), Italian football manager
- Maino Neri (1924–1995), Italian footballer and manager
- Manuel Neri (1930–2021), American artist
- Massimiliano Neri (born 1977), Italian fashion model
- Matteo Neri (born 1999), Italian fencer
- Nick Neri (born 1995), American racing driver
- Paul Néri (1917–1979), Italian racing cyclist
- Philip Neri (1515–1595), Italian saint
- Rodolfo Neri (born 1952), Mexican astronaut
- Romeo Neri (1903–1961), Italian gymnast
- Romulo Neri (born 1950), Filipino educator and public servant
- Rosalba Neri (born 1938), Italian actress
- Rosalina Neri (1927–2024), Italian actress
- Scott Neri, Mexican artist
- Silvério Neri (1858–1934), Brazilian politician

== Sources ==
- Smith, Elsdon Coles (1956). Dictionary of American Family Names. New York City, New York, United States: Harper & Brothers. ISBN 978-0-517-66954-9.
