= Adolphe Belem =

Burkinabé footballer

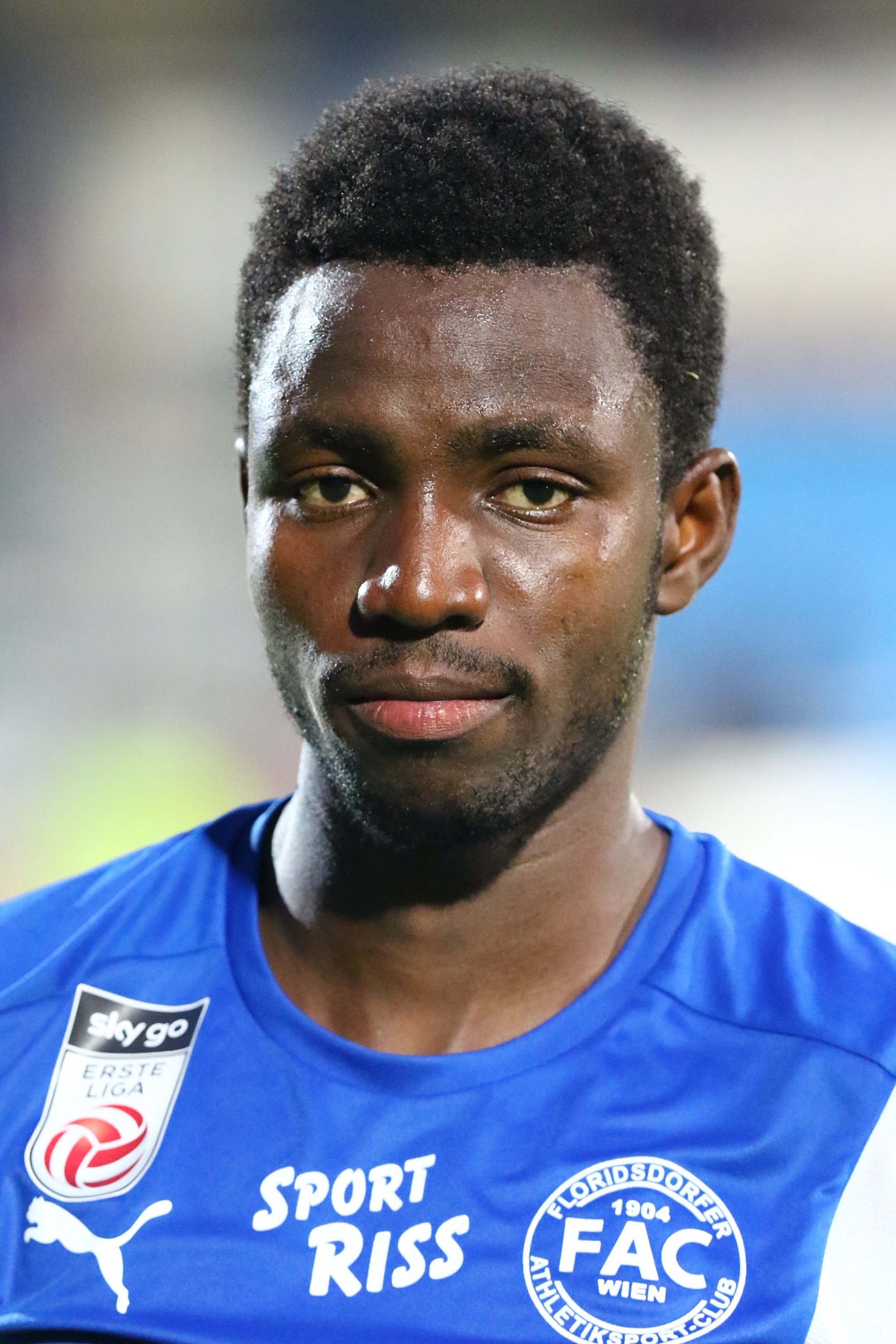

Personal information
- Date of birth: 25 November 1998 (age 27)
- Place of birth: Ouagadougou, Burkina Faso
- Height: 1.80 m (5 ft 11 in)
- Position: Winger

Youth career
- –2013: Rail Club du Kadiogo

Senior career*
Years	Team	Apps	(Gls)
2013–2016	Rail Club du Kadiogo		
2016–2017	Union Lembach	12	(10)
2017–2018	Union Gurten	28	(3)
2018–2020	Floridsdorfer AC	43	(8)
2020–2023	Adanaspor	14	(0)
2023–2024	Asswehly		
2024–2025	Majestic		
2025	Yenisey Krasnoyarsk	4	(0)

International career
	Burkina Faso U17	4	(0)
2015–2019	Burkina Faso U20	3	(0)
- * Club domestic league appearances and goals as of 30 November 2025

Adolphe Belem (born 25 November 1998) is a Burkinabé professional footballer who plays as a winger. He has represented Burkina Faso at youth international level.

== Club career ==
Belem began his career with Rail Club du Kadiogo, making his senior debut at the age of 14. In 2016, he earned a move to Austrian non-league side Union Lembach, scoring ten goals in 12 games. He then moved to Austrian Regionalliga side Union Gurten before making his professional debut for Floridsdorfer AC in the 2. Liga in March 2018. In August 2020, Belem joined TFF First League side Adanaspor.

== International career ==
Belem has represented Burkina Faso at under-18 level.
