= Jean-Marie Huriez =

French footballer and coach (born 1971)

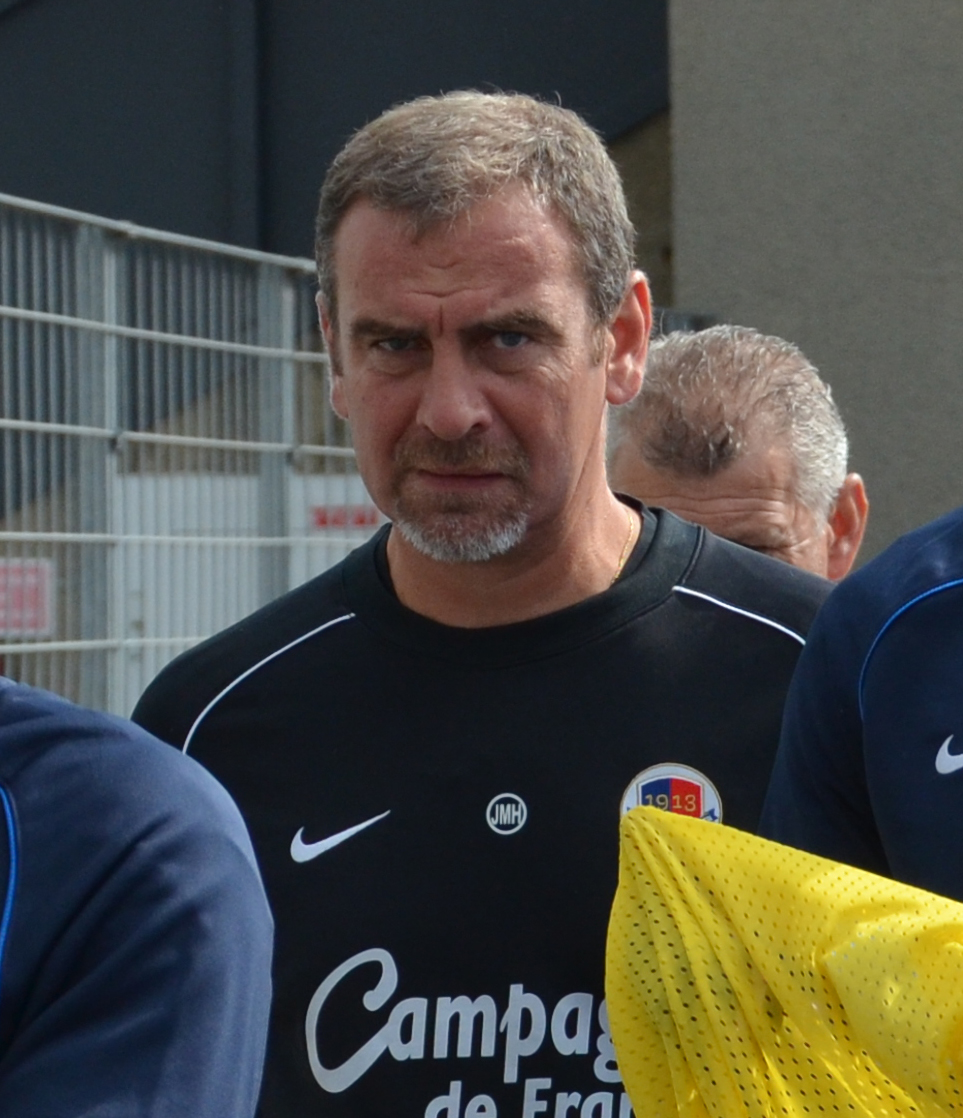

Personal information
- Full name: Jean-Marie Huriez
- Date of birth: 7 March 1971 (age 55)
- Place of birth: Béthisy-Saint-Pierre, France
- Height: 1.83 m (6 ft 0 in)
- Position: Defender

Team information
- Current team: Dijon (assistant)

Senior career*
Years	Team	Apps	(Gls)
1987–1991	Niort	27	(0)
1991–1992	Nancy	2	(0)
1992–1996	Châtellerault	36	(0)
1996–1997	Saint-Christophe Châteauroux		
1997	Cognac		
1997–2004	Cherbourg	109	(13)

Managerial career
- 2004–2009: Cherbourg (assistant)
- 2009–2013: Cherbourg
- 2013–2018: Caen (assistant)
- 2020–2021: Toulouse (assistant)
- 2021–: Dijon (assistant)
- * Club domestic league appearances and goals

Jean-Marie Huriez (born 7 March 1971) is a French professional football coach and former player who played as a defender. As of 2022, he is an assistant coach at Ligue 2 club Dijon.
