= Marcel Mouchel =

French footballer and manager (1927-2012)

Personal information
- Date of birth: 13 February 1927 (age 99)
- Place of birth: Équeurdreville-Hainneville
- Date of death: 7 March 2012 (aged 85)
- Place of death: Cherbourg-en-Cotentin
- Position: Forward

Youth career
- UST Équeurdreville

Senior career*
Years	Team	Apps	(Gls)
1945-1952	AS Cherbourg		
1952-1953	Caen		
1953-1958	AS Cherbourg		
1958-1962	CS Sedan Ardennes	133	(30)

Managerial career
- 1962-1964: Caen
- UST Équeurdreville
- 1970-1971: AS Cherbourg
- * Club domestic league appearances and goals

Marcel Mouchel (13 February 1927, in Équeurdreville-Hainneville (Manche) – 7 March 2012) was a French footballer and manager.

He played as attacker for AS Cherbourg from 1945 to 1958, with one season at SM Caen (1952–53). At Cherbourg, Mouchel played under the management of George Kimpton, Maurice Blondel and Ernest Vaast, who helped him gain the skill needed to win nine caps for France Amateurs (1956–58).

Marcel Mouchel is one of the iconic players of AS Cherbourg, along with Jacky Simon.

After receiving many offers, Marcel Mouchel became a professional at 31, when he signed for CS Sedan – also the club of Zacharie Noah – (1958–62). With his final club, he won the Coupe de France as captain in 1961 against Nîmes 3–1, in Colombes (Hauts-de-Seine). He played a total of 111 matches in Division 1, all with Sedan (23 goals in the championship).

As a coach, Marcel Mouchel managed SM Caen (1962–64), UST Équeurdreville and AS Cherbourg (1970–71).
