= Jacques Mouilleron =

French footballer (1940–2023)

Personal information
- Date of birth: 7 July 1940
- Place of birth: Le Bois-Plage-en-Ré, German-occupied France
- Date of death: 12 May 2023 (aged 82)
- Place of death: La Rochelle, France
- Position: Defender

Youth career
- 1950–1960: ES Rochelaise

Senior career*
Years	Team	Apps	(Gls)
1960–1964	Limoges FC		
1964–1971	Angers		
1971–1973	Red Star 93		
1973–1979	Caen		

Managerial career
- 1973–1979: Caen
- * Club domestic league appearances and goals

Jacques Mouilleron (7 July 1940 – 12 May 2023) was a French football player and manager.

== Career ==
Mouilleron was born in Bois-Plage en Ré. He signed for Limoges FC at the beginning of the 1960s. Capable of playing in defence or midfield, he was signed in 1964 by SCO Angers, where he stayed for seven seasons, including six in the first division and with whom he won the French football Division 2 1968–69. From 1971 to 1973, he spent two seasons in D1 with Red Star 93.

In 1973, he signed for Stade Malherbe Caen, in the third division. In November of the same year, aged 33, he became player-manager of the Caen club, to replace Emile Rummelhardt. A year and a half later, the club won the third division and were promoted to D2. Three seasons later, Stade Malherbe were relegated. Jacques Mouilleron left the post in 1979.

== Death ==
Mouilleron died on 12 May 2023, at the age of 82.
