= Patrick Rémy =

Patrick Rémy may refer to:

- Patrick Rémy (footballer) (born 1954), French former footballer and football manager
- Patrick Rémy (skier) (born 1965), French cross-country skier
