= Christelle =

Christelle or Chrystelle is a French feminine given name. Notable people with the name include:

== People with the name Christelle ==
- Christelle Avomo (born 1992), pop singer from Gabon
- Christelle Bosker, South African Paralympic athlete
- Christelle Bulteau (born 1963), former French track and field athlete
- Christelle Chobet (born 1986), French rugby union player
- Christelle Ciari (born 1976), French-Japanese voice actress
- Christelle Cornil (born 1977), Belgian actress
- Christelle Daunay (born 1974), French long-distance runner
- Christelle d’Intorni (born 1985), French politician
- Christelle Diallo (born 1993), French basketball player
- Christelle Laura Douibi (born 1985), Algerian alpine skier
- Christelle Le Duff (born 1982), French rugby union player
- Christelle Ferrier-Bruneau (born 1979), French racing cyclist
- Christelle Guignard (born 1962), retired French alpine skier
- Christelle Lefranc (born 1980), French fashion model
- Christelle Luisier (born 1974), Swiss politician
- Christelle Mbila (born 1990), beauty queen from the Democratic Republic of the Congo
- Christelle N'Garsanet (born 1983), Ivorian professional basketball player
- Christelle Nana Tchoudjang (born 1989), Cameroonian volleyball player

== People with the name Chrystelle ==
- Chrystelle Trump Bond (1938–2020), American dancer, choreographer, and dance historian
- Chrystelle Sahuc (born 1975), French rhythmic gymnast

== See also ==
- Christel
- Kristel
