= Christl =

Christl is a given name and surname, and may refer to:

== Given name ==
- Christl Cranz (1914–2004), German alpine skier
- Christl Donnelly (born 1967), Professor of Statistical Epidemiology at Imperial College London
- Christl Haas (1943–2001), Austrian alpine skiing champion at the 1964 Winter Olympics
- Christl Hintermaier (born 1946), German alpine skier who competed at the 1968 Winter Olympics
- Christ'l Joris (born 1954), Belgian businesswoman
- Christl Mardayn (1896–1971), Austrian actress and singer
- Christoph Probst (1919–1943), German resistance fighter also known as Christl Probst
- Christl Verduyn (born 1953), Canadian academic
- Christl Ruth Vonholdt (born 1954), German physician and author

== Surname ==
- Cliff Christl (born 1947), American sportswriter
- Lisy Christl (born 1964), German costume designer

== See also ==
- Christ (disambiguation)
- Christel
- Christl Arena, an arena in New York
- Christol
- Christy (disambiguation)
