= Émile Rummelhardt =

French footballer and manager (1914-1978)

Emile Rummelhardt
Personal information
- Date of birth: 12 January 1914
- Place of birth: Mulhouse, Germany
- Date of death: 15 January 1978 (aged 64)
- Place of death: Mérignac, France
- Position: Defender

Senior career*
Years	Team	Apps	(Gls)
- Troyes
- Mulhouse
- Bordeaux

Managerial career
- 1947–1951: Le Mans
- 1951–1952: Gien
- 1952–1955: Metz
- 1955–1958: Mulhouse
- 1958–1959: Forbach
- 1959–1962: Mulhouse
- 1962–1967: Cherbourg
- 1967–1968: Reims
- 1969–1971: Lorient
- 1972–1974: Caen
- * Club domestic league appearances and goals

Émile Rummelhardt (12 January 1914 – 15 January 1978) was a French professional footballer and manager.

== Career ==
Alsatian Émile Rummelhardt played as defender or midfielder for Troyes, FC Mulhouse and Girondins de Bordeaux.

He was manager of Le Mans (1948–51), Gien (1951–52), FC Metz (1952–55), FC Mulhouse (1955–58), US Forbach (1958–59), FC Mulhouse (1959–62), AS Cherbourg (1962–67), Stade de Reims (1967–69), FC Lorient (1969–71) and Stade Malherbe Caen (1972–74). As well as having managed Swiss sides FC Sion and FC Zürich,

He won the Coupe de France in 1941 with Girondins de Bordeaux.

His son is the former ambassador Jacques Rummelhardt.
