= Bèbè Kambou =

Burkinabé footballer

Personal information
- Full name: Roméo Bébé Kambou
- Date of birth: July 1, 1982 (age 44)
- Place of birth: Péni, Upper Volta
- Height: 1.87 m (6 ft 2 in)
- Position: Midfielder

Team information
- Current team: FC Montceau

Youth career
- 1997–1999: US Fran

Senior career*
Years	Team	Apps	(Gls)
1999–2000	ASFA Ouagadougou		
2000–2002	Racing Club de Bobo		
2002–2003	Rail Club du Kadiogo		
2003–2004	CS Louhans-Cuiseaux	21	(0)
2004–2006	FC Rouen	41	(3)
2006–2007	FC Montceau	22	(2)
2007–2009	AS Cherbourg	65	(1)
2009–2010	FC Martigues	11	(1)
2010–2015	FC Montceau	88	(6)

International career
2004–2009	Burkina Faso	15	(0)
- * Club domestic league appearances and goals

Roméo Bébé Kambou (born July 1, 1982) is a Burkinabé former professional footballer who played as a midfielder.

== International career ==
Kambou was a member of the Burkinabé 2004 African Nations Cup team, who finished bottom of their group in the first round of competition, thus failing to secure qualification for the quarter-finals.
