= Jacques Simon (footballer) =

French footballer (1941–2017)

Personal information
- Date of birth: 25 March 1941
- Place of birth: Omonville-la-Rogue, France
- Date of death: 5 December 2017 (aged 76)
- Place of death: Valognes, France
- Position: Midfielder

Youth career
- 1953–1954: UST Équeurdreville

Senior career*
Years	Team	Apps	(Gls)
1959–1963	AS Cherbourg		
1963–1968	Nantes	156	(73)
1968–1970	Bordeaux	60	(18)
1970–1973	Red Star	86	(7)

International career
1965–1969	France	15	(1)
- * Club domestic league appearances and goals

Jacques "Jacky" Simon (25 March 1941 – 5 December 2017) was a French footballer who played as a midfielder. He was part of France national team at the 1966 FIFA World Cup.
