= Ibrahim Kano =

Burkinabé footballer

Personal information
- Date of birth: December 12, 1982 (age 43)
- Place of birth: Kadiogo, Upper Volta
- Height: 1.93 m (6 ft 4 in)
- Position: Defender

Team information
- Current team: EFO
- Number: 4

Senior career*
Years	Team	Apps	(Gls)
2002–2006	Rail Club du Kadiogo	22	(0)
2006–2008	FC Botoşani	58	(0)
2008–2009	Internaţional Piteşti	21	(0)
2009–	EFO	14	(0)

International career
2001–2003	Burkina Faso	2	(0)
- * Club domestic league appearances and goals

Ibrahim Kano (December 12, 1982, in Kadiogo) is a Burkinabé professional footballer. He plays for Étoile Filante Ouagadougou.

== Career ==
Kano began his career with Rail Club du Kadiogo, which was later renamed Captain. In summer 2006, he signed with FC Botoşani. The defender played 58 games for FC Botoşani before transferring in summer 2008 to FC Internaţional Curtea de Argeş. After the end of his contract with the Romanian side FC Internaţional Curtea de Argeş, he returned to Burkina Faso and signed with Étoile Filante Ouagadougou.

== International career ==
Kano made his debut for the Burkina Faso national football team on 13 April 2001 against Togo national football team in the Union des Fédérations Ouest Africaines.
