= Christal =

Christal is a feminine given name. Notable people with the name include:

- Christal Bezerra, Brazilian artistic gymnast
- Christal Clashing, Antiguan swimmer
- Christal Henner, American bridge player
- Christal Lloyd, American politician

== See also ==
- Christal Films
- Christel
