= Jean-Marie Elie =

French footballer and manager (born 1950)

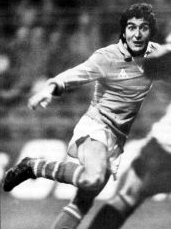
- Elie with Lens in 1975

Personal information
- Date of birth: 30 September 1950 (age 76)
- Place of birth: Longchamp-sur-Aujon, France
- Height: 1.74 m (5 ft 9 in)
- Position: Midfielder

Senior career*
Years	Team	Apps	(Gls)
1967–1978	Lens	272+ (Note: Statistics are missing for the 1969–70 season.)	(54+)
1978–1981	Saint-Étienne	90	(8)
Total		362+	(62+)

International career
1973	France B	1	(0)

Managerial career
- 1984–2007: UST Équeurdreville
- 2019–2023: Cherbourg
- * Club domestic league appearances and goals

Jean-Marie Elie (born 30 September 1950) is a French former professional footballer who played as a midfielder. During his career of fourteen years, he played for Lens and Saint-Étienne, notably winning the Division 1 in the 1980–81 season with the latter.

== International career ==
Elie made one appearance for the France B national team in a 1–1 friendly draw to Cercle Brugge on 20 November 1973.

== Post-playing career ==
Elie retired from football in 1981. From 1983 to 1984, he worked as the sporting director of his former club Saint-Étienne. He would then go on to be the manager of UST Équeurdreville from 1984 to 2007, a managerial reign of twenty-three years. Later, he started working as a sport educator and coach for the Lecanu futsal team. In September 2009, he received the Trophée Georges-Boulogne, a trophy awarded by the Amicale des éducateurs de football.

From 2017 to 2019, Elie worked as a member of staff at Cherbourg. In January 2019, he took over the club's head coach position.

== Honours ==
Lens

- Division 2: 1972–73
- Coupe de France runner-up: 1974–75

Saint-Étienne

- Division 1: 1980–81
- Coupe de France runner-up: 1980–81
