= Assia Zlatkowa =

Assia Zlatkowa Schwarck
- Born: Assia Georgiewa Zlatkowa; 1953 (age 72–73); Plovdiv, Bulgaria
- Citizenship: Danish
- Occupation: Pianist • Piano teacher
- Years active: 1965-1995
- Agents: International Concert Management; Dr. Gösta Schwarck International
- Spouse: Gösta Schwarck
- Website: www.assia.dk

Assia Zlatkowa Schwarck (Bulgarian: Ася Златкова; born 1953) is a Danish concert pianist of Bulgarian and Greek descent. She was active from 1965–1995.

== Career ==
Zlatkowa attended the National Music School Lyubomir Pipkov in Sofia. At age 8 she appeared in the film The First Steps. She went on to study at the National Academy of Music under Kutewa; she also studied with Guido Agosti in Weimar and Siena and Herman D. Koppel in Denmark.

Kurt Masur signed her, at 14 years old, to perform Mozart's Piano Concerto No. 20 with the Dresden Philharmonic. The conductor was Heinz Bongartz. She was often invited to perform in Germany, including a collaboration with the Berlin Philharmonic to perform Beethoven's Op 37. She also toured in Poland and Italy.

Her first piano recital in Denmark was at the Tivoli Gardens, Copenhagen in August 1975. Her performance of Chopin's concerto in E-minor with Carlo Zecchi and the Copenhagen Philharmonic on March 1, 1977 was recorded for an LP by the record label Point. On May 5, 1977 she played the same concerto with the same conductor and the Danish Radio Symphony Orchestra in the Tivoli Concert Hall for Danish National Television. She became a Danish citizen in 1978.
