= Amara Ahmed Ouattara =

Burkinabé footballer

Amara Ouattara
Personal information
- Full name: Amara Ahmed Ouattara
- Date of birth: 21 October 1983
- Place of birth: Bobo-Dioulasso, Upper Volta
- Height: 1.84 m (6 ft 0 in)
- Position: Attacking midfielder

Senior career*
Years	Team	Apps	(Gls)
2003–2003	Rail Club Kadiogo		
2003–2004	ASEC Mimosas		
2004–2007	AS Cherbourg	24	(1)
2007–2008	US Raon-l'Étape	13	(0)
2008–2010	ÉDS Montluçon	21	(0)
2010–2013	AS Cherbourg	21	(0)

International career
1995–2002	Burkina Faso	22	(1)
- * Club domestic league appearances and goals

Amara Ahmed Ouattara (born 21 October 1983) is a Burkinabe former professional footballer who played as an attacking midfielder.

== Club career ==
Outtara was born in Bobo-Dioulasso, Upper Volta. After starting professionally in his country with Rail Club du Kadiogo in 2003, Ouattara moved the following year to the Ivory Coast, signing with ASEC Mimosas.

Ouattara then spent the following years in France, always in the lower leagues (Championnat National); he started with AS Cherbourg Football (24 matches and one goal in two half seasons), then US Raon-l'Étape (13 matches in 2007–08) and ÉDS Montluçon.

== International career ==
Ouattara gained his first cap for Burkina Faso in 2003, and was a member of the national team at the 2004 African Nations Cup, as it finished bottom of its group in the first round, thus failing to secure qualification for the quarter-finals.

He also represented the nation at the 2003 FIFA World Youth Championship, as it finished atop in group stage, before bowing out in the round of 16.
