= Maurice Lafont =

French footballer (1927–2005)

Personal information
- Date of birth: 13 September 1927
- Place of birth: Villeneuve-Saint-Georges, France
- Date of death: 8 April 2005 (aged 77)
- Position: Defender

Senior career*
Years	Team	Apps	(Gls)
1950–1951	Nîmes	8	(1)
1951–1952	Grenoble	19	(3)
1952–1959	Nîmes	224	(7)
1959–1960	Toulon	14	(1)
1959–1960	Montpellier	13	(0)
1960–1961	Toulon	26	(2)
1961–1963	Châteauroux		

International career
1958	France	4	(0)

Managerial career
- 1961–1963: Châteauroux
- 1965–1967: RC Vichy
- 1967–1968: AS Cherbourg
Medal record
Representing France
FIFA World Cup
Third place	1958 Sweden
- * Club domestic league appearances and goals

Maurice Lafont (13 September 1927 – 8 April 2005) was a French football defender. He was part of the France national team during the 1958 FIFA World Cup tournament and obtained four international caps, all of which came in that same year.

== Honours ==
France

- FIFA World Cup third place: 1958
