= Stade de Venoix =

Multi-use stadium in Caen, France

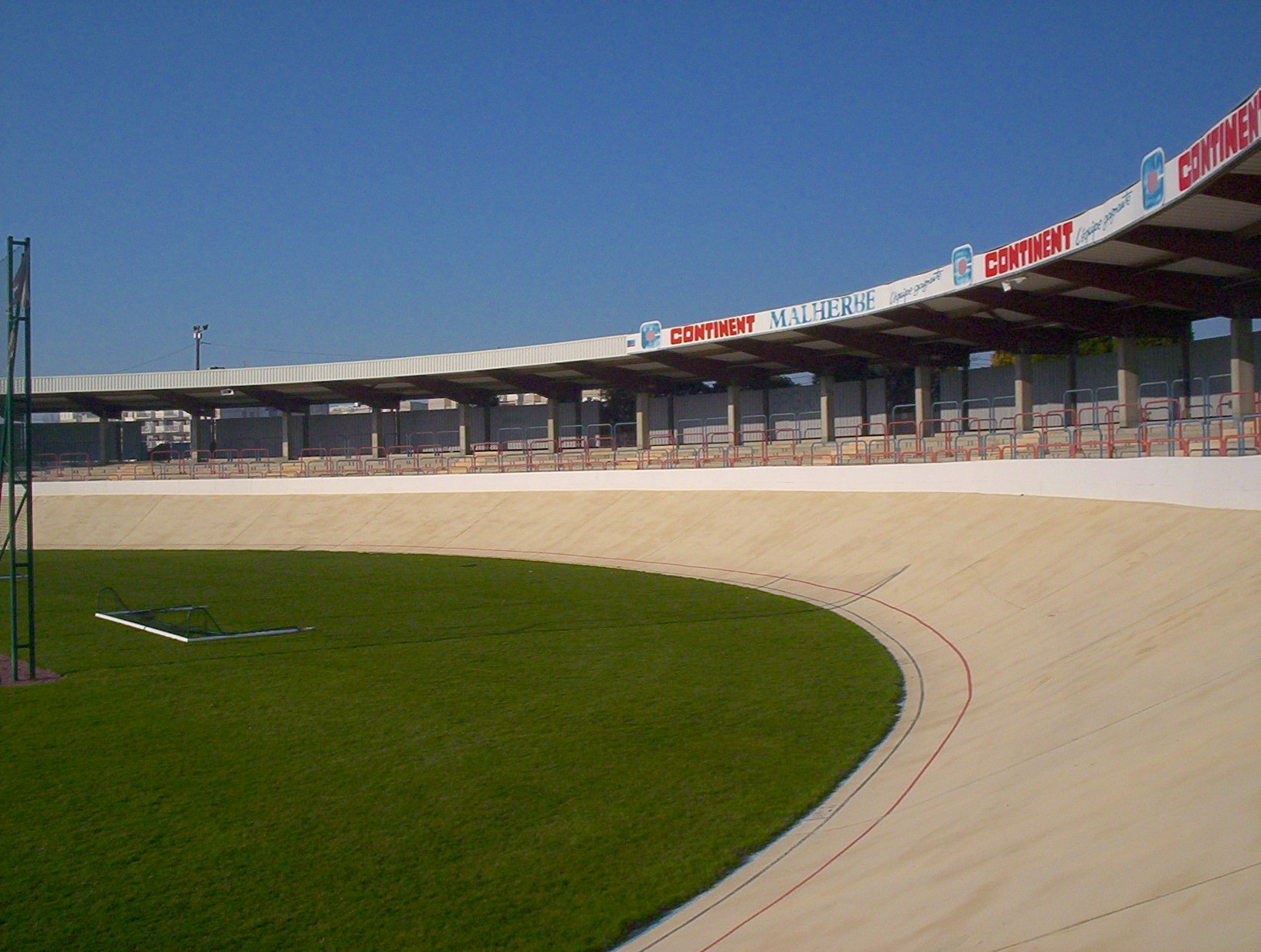
- Interactive map of Stade de Venoix
- Full name: Stade de Venoix
- Location: Caen, France
- Coordinates: 49°10′33″N 0°23′29″W
- Owner: SM Caen
- Operator: SM Caen
- Capacity: 11,500

Construction
- Built: 1914
- Opened: 1925
- Closed: 1993

Tenant
- SM Caen

Stade de Venoix was a multi-use stadium in Caen, France. It was initially used as the stadium of SM Caen matches. It was replaced by the current Stade Michel d'Ornano in 1993. The capacity of the stadium was 11,500 spectators.
