= Fabrice Divert =

French footballer (born 1967)

Personal information
- Date of birth: 9 February 1967 (age 59)
- Place of birth: Caen, France
- Height: 1.80 m (5 ft 11 in)
- Position: Striker

Senior career*
Years	Team	Apps	(Gls)
1983–1991	Caen	145	(42)
1991–1997	Montpellier	154	(48)
1995–1996	→ Guingamp (loan)	5	(2)

International career
1990–1992	France	3	(1)
- * Club domestic league appearances and goals

Fabrice Divert (born 9 February 1967) is a French former footballer who played as a striker.

== Football career ==
Divert was born in Caen, Calvados. During his career, he played mainly for SM Caen and Montpellier HSC, scoring prolifically for both. On 20 May 1989, as home side Girondins de Bordeaux led 2–0 at half-time in the final day of the season, he scored a hat-trick that saved Caen from relegation. At the end of his tenure (having made his professional debuts at 16), he was first summoned by France, for a friendly in Hungary, on 28 March 1990, being then selected for UEFA Euro 1992, where he did not play.

During 1994–95, with Montpellier, Divert suffered a serious foot injury, from which he never recovered again. On loan to En Avant de Guingamp the following season, he still netted the league opener for the club, but only appeared in another four matches. He retired at only 29.

Since 2005, Divert acted as player/president of amateur side AS Verson.

== Honours ==
=== Player ===
Montpellier

- Coupe de la Ligue: 1991–92
