= Nieri =

Nieri is a surname. Notable people with the surname include:

- Lisandro Nieri, Politician in Argentina
- Nicolas Nieri (1939-2017), Peruvian footballer

== See also ==
- Neri
