= Seidou Idrissa =

Nigerien footballer

Saïdou Idrissa
Personal information
- Date of birth: 24 December 1985 (age 40)
- Place of birth: Niamey, Niger
- Height: 1.87 m (6 ft 2 in)
- Position: Striker

Senior career*
| Years | Team | Apps | (Gls) |
| 2002–2007 | AS FNIS Niamey | | |
| 2007 | Étoile Filante | | |
| 2008 | Gent | 0 | (0) |
| 2008–2010 | Rail Club Kadiogo | | |
| 2010–2012 | Coton Sport | | |
| 2012–2013 | Chippa United | 5 | (0) |
| 2013–2016 | Sahel SC | | |
| 2016–2019 | AS SONIDEP | | |

International career
| 2003–2013 | Niger | 15 | (1) |
- * Club domestic league appearances and goals

Saïdou Idrissa (born 24 December 1985), is a Nigerien professional footballer who last played as a striker for AS SONIDEP. He has represented the Niger national team at international level.

== Club career ==
Idrissa was born in Niamey.

After a spell in Belgium with K.A.A. Gent, he signed for Cotonsport FC de Garoua in 2010.

== International career ==
Idrissa played for Niger between 2003 and 2013.
