= Jeannot Bouyain =

Burkinabé footballer

Personal information
- Full name: Ayissoudou Jeannot Bouyain
- Date of birth: 29 May 1985 (age 41)
- Place of birth: Ouagadougou, Burkina Faso
- Position: Midfielder

Youth career
- 1999–2000: Planéte Champions

Senior career*
Years	Team	Apps	(Gls)
2001–2002	Planéte Champions		
2003–2007	RC Kadiogo		
2007–2008	ASFA Yennega		
2008–2009	Blois Foot 41		
2009–2010	Olympique Saumur FC		
2010–2011	Cholet		

International career
2000–2001	Burkina Faso U-17		
2002–2003	Burkina Faso U-20		
2001–2005	Burkina Faso	3	(0)
- * Club domestic league appearances and goals

Ayissoudou Jeannot Bouyain (born 29 May 1985, in Ouagadougou) is a Burkinabé former professional footballer who played as a midfielder.

== International career ==
Bouyain represented Burkina Faso at the 2001 FIFA U-17 World Championship in Trinidad and Tobago and played two years later the 2003 FIFA World Youth Championship in the United Arab Emirates. He was part of the Burkina Faso national team which finished in fourth place in the 2006 FIFA World Cup qualification (CAF).
