= Pierre Mankowski =

French former football striker (born 1951)

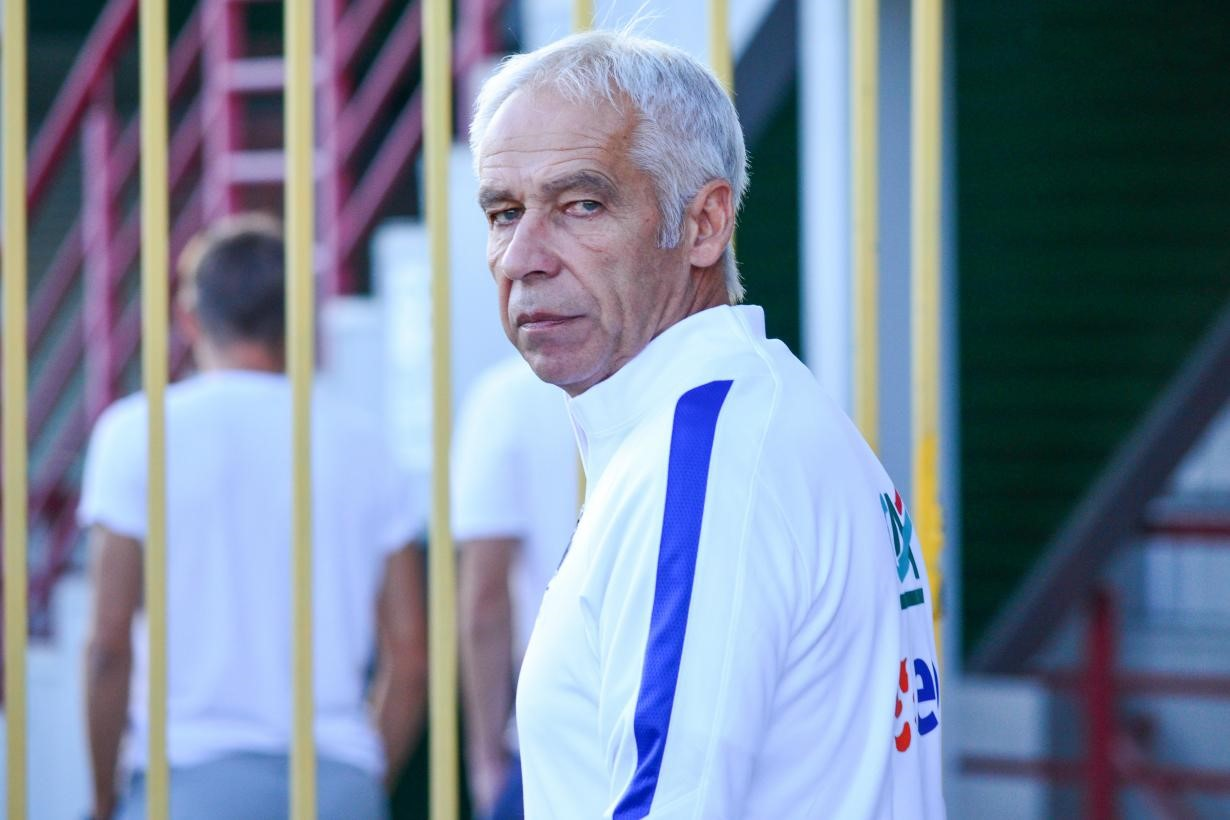
- Mankowski in 2016

Personal information
- Full name: Pierre Charles Mankowski
- Date of birth: 4 November 1951 (age 74)
- Place of birth: Amiens, Somme, France
- Height: 1.80 m (5 ft 11 in)
- Position: Striker

Youth career
- –1972: Amiens

Senior career*
Years	Team	Apps	(Gls)
1972–1976	Lens		
1976–1978	SC Hazebrouck		
1978–1983	Amiens		

Managerial career
- 1983–1988: Caen
- 1988–1993: Le Havre
- 1993–1994: Lille
- 1994–1996: Caen
- 1996–1997: Saint-Etienne
- 1998–1999: Strasbourg
- 2000–2002: France U16
- 2002–2010: France (assistant)
- 2010–2014: France U18
- 2014–2016: France U21
Medal record
Men's football
Representing France (as manager)
FIFA U-20 World Cup
Winner	2013
- * Club domestic league appearances and goals

Pierre Charles Mankowski (born 4 November 1951) is a French former football striker who later became a coach. He is of Polish descent.

Mankowski is currently a football advisor at Scottish club Caledonian Braves.
