= Guy Serge Yaméogo =

Ivorian footballer (born 2000)

Personal information
- Full name: Guy Serge Cédric Yaméogo
- Date of birth: 30 December 2000 (age 25)
- Place of birth: Ivory Coast
- Height: 1.85 m (6 ft 1 in)
- Position: Centre-back

Team information
- Current team: Floriana
- Number: 79

Senior career*
Years	Team	Apps	(Gls)
2017–2020	Williamsville AC		
2020	Tabor Sežana	12	(0)
2020–2023	Samsunspor	3	(0)
2021–2022	→ Westerlo (loan)	13	(0)
2022–2023	→ Boluspor (loan)	1	(0)
2024–	Floriana	26	(1)
- * Club domestic league appearances and goals as of 26 June 2025

Guy Serge Cédric Yaméogo (born 30 December 2000) is an Ivorian professional footballer who plays as a centre-back for Maltese side Floriana.

== Career ==
On 19 August 2020, Yaméogo signed for Turkish club Samsunspor on a five-year contract. On 22 July 2022, he moved to Boluspor on loan for the 2022–23 season. His contract with Samsunspor was terminated by mutual consent on 9 August 2023.

== Honours ==
Westerlo

- Belgian First Division B: 2021–22
