= AS Cherbourg Football =

French football club, based in Cherbourg

AS Cherbourg
- Full name: Association Sportive de Cherbourg Football
- Founded: 1906; 120 years ago
- Ground: Stade Maurice Postaire
- Capacity: 7,000
- Chairman: Fabien Lemarinel
- Manager: Christophe Gosselin
- League: Régional 3 Normandy
- Website: www.ascherbourg-foot.net
Home colours	Away colours

AS Cherbourg or the Association Sportive de Cherbourg Football is a French football team currently playing in Régional 3, the eighth tier of French football, after suffering expulsion from the national leagues in 2023. They are based in the city of Cherbourg-en-Cotentin, Manche in Normandy in north-west France.

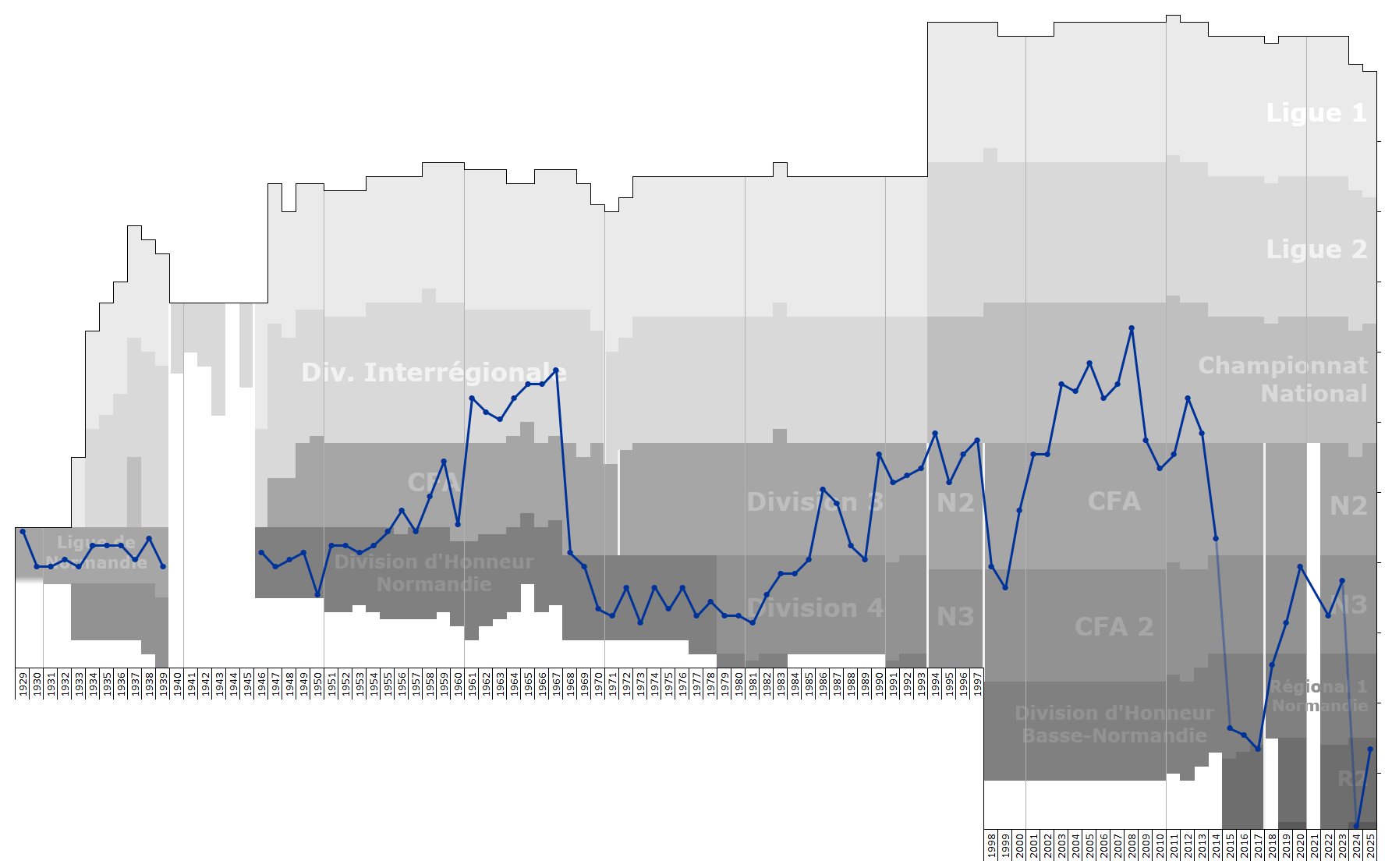
Historical league performance chart of AS Cherbourg

== History ==
The club started in 1906 as Stella de Cherbourg. in 1945 the club merged with Stella's football joined the newly formed multi-sports club becoming the Association Sportive Cherbourg (ASC).

The 1955-56 season saw them start in the Championnat de France Amateur after winning the Division d'Honneur the previous season. However it was just for one season before being relegated back down, but the club immediately bounced back up after winning the Division d'Honneur again. The club spent 3 seasons in the Championnat de France Amateur, being promoted to Ligue 2 at end of the 1959-1960 season. The club spent six seasons in the 2nd tier of the French football league system before being relegated 2 seasons in a row and going back to the Division d'Honneur.

After 10 seasons in the Division d'Honneur the club were moved to Division 4 for the start of the 1978-79 season, and winning the division 4 title in the 1985-86 season. After 3 seasons in Division three the club were relegated, but immediately bounced back as champions. The club won promotion again to Championnat National 1 for the 1993-94 season, but could only survive a single season before being relegated. However two seasons later in National 2 the club was back in National league 1, but again for one season and relegated to CFA

The club then spent the next seventeen seasons moving between the CFA and National, with the 2013-14 season seeing them relegated back to the Division d'Honneur and Regional leagues. At the end of the 2017-18 season, the club gained promotion back to National 3. After 4 seasons the club was relegated back to the regional leagues depsite finishing 4th by the Direction Nationale du Contrôle de Gestion after their budget showed a deficit. The club have remained in the Regional leagues since.

== Current squad ==
As of 22 February 2022

Note: Flags indicate national team as defined under FIFA eligibility rules; some limited exceptions apply. Players may hold more than one non-FIFA nationality.

No.	Pos.	Nation	Player
—	GK	FRA	Kevin Aubin
—	GK	FRA	Kevin Berot
—	GK	FRA	Pierre Leroux
—	GK	FRA	Rémi Estival
—	DF	FRA	Abdelkader Aourai
—	DF	FRA	Edouard Hélaine
—	DF	FRA	Alexandre Robillard
—	DF	FRA	Thimote Romeu
—	DF	FRA	Tom Bolbec
—	DF	FRA	Amour Makabi
—	MF	SEN	Matias Tendeng

No.	Pos.	Nation	Player
—	MF	FRA	Rachid El Himri
—	MF	FRA	Mickael Dunand
—	MF	FRA	Alexandre Leguerrier
—	MF	FRA	Sawani Mounkala
—	MF	BRA	Nathan Guimaraes
—	MF	FRA	Hugo Cardet
—	FW	FRA	Erwan M'Boma
—	FW	FRA	Valentin Regnier
—	FW	BRA	Julio Romaneli
—	FW	FRA	Yannis Fleury
—	FW	TAH	Tutehau Tufariua

== Stadium ==
The club play their home games at the Stade Maurice-Postaire. The stadium was built in 1934 and is named after the deputy mayor for sports in 1982, who died in a car accident a year earlier. The stadium has a capacity of 7,000.

== Honours ==
- Division 4 Group B (2) 1984-85,1988-89
- DH Normandie (1) 1956-57
- DH Basse-Normandie (3) 1990-91, 2003-04, 2005-06
- Regional 3 Normandie group A (1) 2023-24
- Coupe Basse-Normandie (3) 1982-83, 1983-84, 1996-97
- Coupe Normandie (1) 1961-62

== Notable players ==
Players that have full international caps who have played for the club.

1. (Algeria) Mohamed Lekkak
2. (Burkina Faso) Amara Ahmed Ouattara
3. (Burkina Faso) Bèbè Kambou
4. (Burkina Faso) Boubacar Kébé
5. (Republic of the Congo) Christel Kimbembe
6. (France) Jacques Simon
7. (France) André Simonyi
8. (French Guiana) Simon Lugier
9. (Gabon) Landry Poulangoye
10. (Guadeloupe) Richard Socrier
11. (Guadeloupe) Steve Haguy
12. (Guadeloupe) Méddy Lina
13. (Guinea) Aboubacar Sylla
14. (Guinea) Victor Correia
15. (Ivory Coast) Jonathan Kodjia
16. (Mali) Boubacar Sylla
17. (Martinique) Bruno Grougi
18. (Morocco) Jawad El Hajri
19. (Poland) Romuald Chojnacki
20. (Poland) Marek Kostrzewa
21. (Republic of the Congo) Lys Mouithys
22. (Senegal) Édouard Mendy
23. (Senegal) Pape Hamadou N'Diaye
24. (Senegal) Papiss Cissé
25. (Togo) Camaldine Abraw
26. (Togo) Richmond Forson

== Notable Managers ==
1. (Algeria) Noël Tosi
2. (England) Sid Kimpton
3. (France) Jean-Marie Elie
4. (France) Patrice Garande
5. (France) Hervé Renard
6. (France) Maurice Lafont
7. (France) Marcel Mouchel
8. (France) Jean-Marie Huriez
9. (France) Denis Goavec
10. (France) Ernest Vaast
11. (France) Hubert Velud
12. (Hungary) (France) André Simonyi
13. (Scotland) Peter Farmer
