= Hamadou Derra =

Burkinabé footballer

Personal information
- Full name: Hamadou Derra
- Date of birth: November 27, 1985 (age 40)
- Place of birth: Ouagadougou, Burkina Faso
- Height: 1.77 m (5 ft 10 in)
- Position: Midfielder

Team information
- Current team: Rail Club du Kadiogo
- Number: 27

Senior career*
Years	Team	Apps	(Gls)
2002–2006	Rail Club du Kadiogo	20	(0)
2006–2008	FC Botoşani	41	(0)
2008–	Rail Club du Kadiogo	42	(14)
- * Club domestic league appearances and goals

Hamadou Derra (born November 27, 1985, in Ouagadougou) is a Burkinabé professional footballer. He currently plays as a midfielder for Rail Club du Kadiogo.

== Career ==
On 1 August 2006, Derra left Rail Club du Kadiogo and signed a contract for FC Botoşani. On 19 September 2008 his club FC Botoşani resigns his contract and he returned to Rail Club du Kadiogo.
