= Christel Marott =

Danish illustrator, painter, and artist

- Born: Christel Andrée Julie Louise Brián Schwarck; December 6, 1919; Copenhagen, Denmark
- Died: May 2, 1992 (aged 72); Herlev, Denmark
- Known for: Illustration
- Spouse: Johannes Marott

Christel Andrée Julie Louise Brián Schwarck, married Marott (December 6, 1919 in Copenhagen – May 2, 1992 in Herlev) known throughout Denmark as Christel was a Danish illustrator, painter, and sculptor. Her debut in 1939 was for the weekly magazine Søndags-B.T. where she remained on contract for life and also worked for magazines in Denmark as well as abroad. She made illustrations for novels and short stories, fashion tips, pattern sheets, vignettes for astrology as well as paper dolls. She illustrated books, a.o. the Susy Rødtop series by Gretha Stevns and the Puk series by Lisbeth Werner.

She designed a series of porcelain figurines for Royal Copenhagen. Christel's drawings were sold as letterheads, in girlfriend books and in a range of other products. She made commercial drawings for several products, designed clothes and shoes under the label Christel of Copenhagen. She sculpted and decorated mannequin dolls for Hindsgaul and in 1971 she designed the decorations and costumes for the Noël Coward play Private Lives. Her drawings were also published as a collector's items and as pin-ups.

Christel drew in a very personal style, appealing for both young women and young men; her drawings both erotic and sweet at the same time. In her opinion she felt that her work was popular because it "contained a large element of fashion and new style at a time when girls looked dreadful in the clothes of the day, as no-one had yet bothered to invent women's everyday fashion".

Christel was married to the actor Johannes Marott with whom she had three children; Kasper, Stine and Kim. From 1973 until her death she lived in Rome, Italy.
