= Felice Maria Nerini =

Italian writer and historian

Felice Maria Nerini (1705 - 17 January 1787) was an Italian writer and historian, mainly of the Hieronymite order.

== Biography ==
He was born in Milan. He joined the Hieronymite order, and rose rapidly to its procurator general and abbot. He then served Pope Benedict XIV as consultant for the Congregation of the Holy Office in Rome. He helped collect, for the convent of Santi Bonifacio ed Alessio in Rome, instruments and books for the study of mathematics and the sciences. He was patronized by Cardinal Angelo Maria Querini, to whom his works, in Latin, are dedicated. These include:

- Hieronymianae familiae vetera monumenta ad amplissimum Dominum
- De suscepto itinere subalpino: Epistolae Tres (1753)
- De templo et coenobio sanctorum Bonifacii et Alexii historica monumenta
