= Lisbeth Werner =

Lisbeth Werner was the pseudonym that the Danish writers Knud Meister and Carlo Andersen used in order to publish a series of popular teenage books about Puk (Puck), a girl that attended a boarding school. In Danish 46 books were published, only 18 were translated into Swedish. 21 of the books were translated into French and 29 were translated into Spanish and Catalan by Editorial Toray (Ediciones Toray). The intrigues in the stories are partly triggered by new pupils that have trouble in accommodating themselves and partly by mysteries. Despite the fact that the boarding school was of mixed gender the conflicts mostly took place among the girls.
