= FC Équeurdreville-Hainneville =

- Full name: Football Club Équeurdreville-Hainneville
- Founded: 1924
- Ground: Stade Jean Jaurès
- Chairman: Vincent Baude
- Manager: Damien Loisel
- League: Régional 2
Home colours

FC Équeurdreville-Hainneville is a French football club based in Cherbourg-en-Cotentin. They are currently playing at the Régional 3 level.

== History ==
The club was founded in 1924 as UST Equeurdreville. The club played in various departmental and regional leagues until the end of the 1964-65 season when they finished second in the Division d’Honneur de Normandie and gained promotion to Championnat de France Amateur, then the third tier of the French football league system. The club spent a single seasons in the Championnat de France Amateurbefore being relegated back to the Regional leagues, where they have remained since.

In 2008 the club merged with AS Hainneville to form FC Équeurdreville-Hainneville.

== Ground ==
The club play their home games at the Stade Jean Jaurès. The stadium is named after Jean Jaurès, co-founder of the newspaper L'Humanité and spearheaded the unification of various factions into the first major unified French Socialist Party.

The stadium was opened in 1923, originally as a Velodrome, which was used several times as a stage finish for the Tour de France. The stadium was converted into a football stadium.

== Honours ==
- Regional 2 champion (1) – 2021-22

== Notable Managers ==
- (France) Marcel Mouchel
- (France) Jean-Marie Elie
