= Stade Malherbe Caen =

French football club

- Full name: Stade Malherbe Caen
- Nickname: Malherbe
- Short name: SMC
- Founded: 17 November 1913; 113 years ago
- Stadium: Stade Michel d'Ornano
- Capacity: 20,300
- Owner(s): Coalition Capital (80%); PAC-Invest (20%)
- President: Ziad Hammoud
- Head coach: Gaël Clichy
- League: Ligue 3
- 2025–26: Championnat National, 8th of 17
- Website: www.smcaen.fr
Home colours	Away colours

Stade Malherbe Caen (French pronunciation: [stad malɛʁb kɑ̃]; commonly known as SM Caen, Malherbe, or simply Caen) is a French professional football team, based in the city of Caen in Normandy, that competes in the Championnat National from 2025–26 after relegation from Ligue 2 in 2024–25. The club was founded on 17 November 1913 by the merger of Club Malherbe Caennais and Club Sportif Caennais.

For most of its history, SM Caen has been one of the main amateur clubs in France. The late 1980s and early 1990s saw the rise of Stade Malherbe in the French football hierarchy. In 1985, Stade Malherbe adopted professional status. Three seasons later, it was promoted for the first time to first division. In 1992, a few months after being narrowly saved from bankruptcy, the club finished fifth in Division 1 and qualified for UEFA Cup. However, it was relegated three years later. Despite a second division title won in 1996, SM Caen fell back into anonymity in the second division.

Under the chairmanship of Jean-François Fortin, from 2002, and under the sporting direction of Patrick Rémy, Franck Dumas, and then Patrice Garande, the Stade Malherbe has regained sporting success. The club was promoted into Ligue 1 several times, reached the Coupe de la Ligue final in 2005 and finished 7th in Ligue 1 in 2016. In 2018, during the club's fifth consecutive season in Ligue 1, a conflict erupted within the management team, causing the departure of chairman Jean-François Fortin and coach Patrice Garande. Caen was relegated to Ligue 2 in 2019. Facing financial troubles, it was bought by the American fund Oaktree Capital Management in 2020, which appointed Olivier Pickeu as the new president. In 2024, Oaktree's 80% stake was acquired by investment firm Coalition Capital, a subsidiary of Kylian Mbappé's company Interconnected Ventures.

SM Caen has been playing since 1993 at the Stade Michel d'Ornano. Before and since its foundation, the club played at Stade de Venoix, which is now used by the reserve team. It has geographical rivalries with Le Havre AC (sometimes called "Le derby normand") and Stade Rennais, its closest neighbour when the club was in Ligue 1.

== History ==
=== Genesis (Before 1913) ===
Many football clubs were constituted in Caen at the end of the 19th century : the Union sportive des étudiants de Caen, founded in 1892, the Union Athlétique du Lycée Malherbe (UALM), founded in 1892 or 1895 and the Club Sportif Caennais, founded in November 1899. These clubs participated in the early editions of the football championship organised by the Union des Sociétés Françaises de Sports Athlétiques.

In 1907, former members of UALM created the Club Malherbe Caennais, soon the best club in Lower Normandy. In 1909 and 1911, several friendlies matches were organised between a selection of players from Caen and the English club of St Albans City F.C.

=== First years and first professional adventure (1913–1947) ===
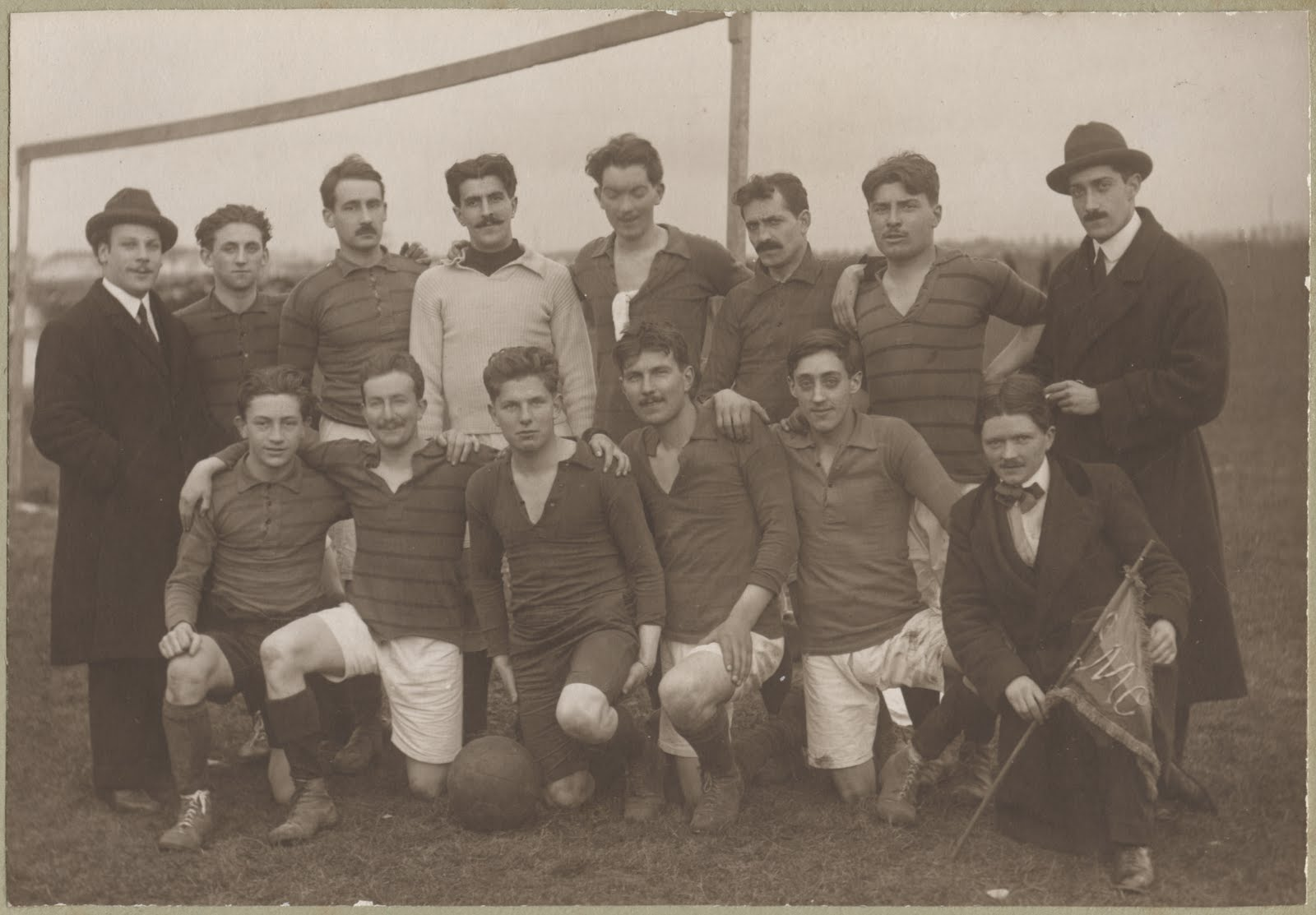
Stade Malherbe team in 1919

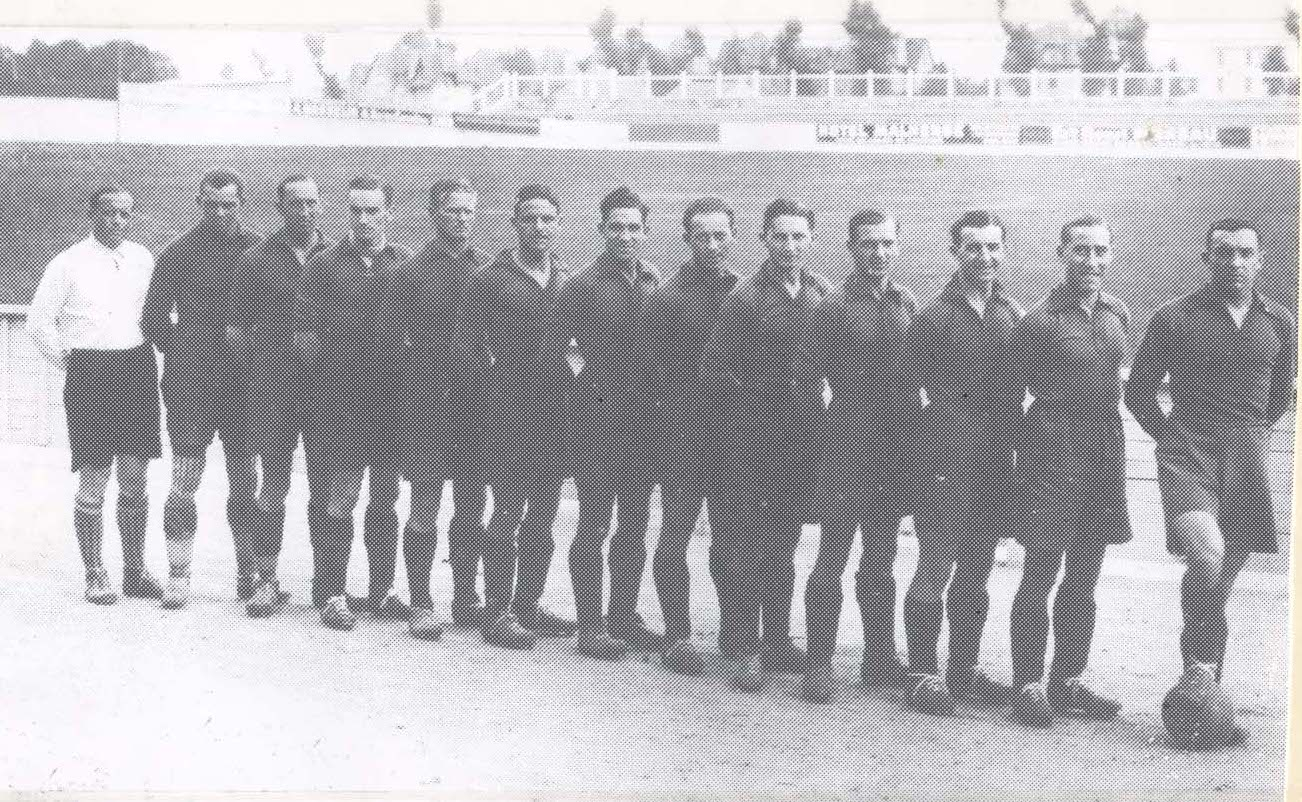
First professional team of Stade Malherbe, 1934–35 season

The Stade Malherbe Caennais was officially founded on 17 November 1913 from the merger of Club Sportif Caennais and Club Malherbe Caennais. It was a multi-sport athletic club, which adopted the "Malherbe" and the striped jersey of the CMC, and the red and blue colours of CSC. The club had its own facilities – the Stade de Venoix – inherited from the CMC.

The football team of CMC, engaged in the league in Lower Normandy, changed its name just after the start of the season. By winning this competition, Stade Malherbe recorded their first title in its first year of existence. Having qualified for the finals of the 1914 USFSA Football Championship, Caen was eliminated in the 1/8 final by the Union sportive Servannaise : after a draw in the first game (3–3) it had to forfeit the second. World War I stopped the competitions. Thirty-nine members of the club were killed in the fighting, including former captain Eugène Lesomptier.

In 1919, the USFSA championship was replaced by regional championships organised by the French Football Federation, called Division d'Honneur. Stade Malherbe, reinforced by the move to Caen of the former French international Eugène Maës, won six times the championship of Lower Normandy between 1920 and 1928, but were unable to compete with the major Upper Normandy clubs, Le Havre AC and FC Rouen. Since 1919–20, Caen also participated in the Coupe de France but fell in round of 32 in 1921 and 1922. In 1929, the two Division d'Honneur leagues of Normandy were merged and Stade Malherbe was promoted the year after. Its best final standing was 5th in 1933.

In 1934, one year after FC Rouen and Le Havre AC, Stade Malherbe acquired professional status and reached the French Division 2. The club finished 11th out of 16 for the first season, then 6th in 1936 and 8th in 1937. But its financial situation deteriorated and Stade Malherbe left D2 in 1938, after four professional seasons.

The club then returned to Division d'Honneur of Normandy. It won the last edition before World War II in 1938–39, and the first two after WW2 in 1946 and 1947.

=== An important amateur club (1948–1985) ===
In 1948, Stade Malherbe joined the newly founded Championnat de France amateur, the third level of French football. Soon considered as a "lord" in CFA, Caen was unable to win the championship, unlike their regional rival US Quevilly, despite successive calls to former French international players as coaches: Jules Vandooren, Jean Prouff, Andre Grillon, Jean Vincent and Oliver Celestin.

Stade Malherbe made itself known essentially by repeated feats in Coupe de France in the 1950s : French champion Stade de Reims (2–1) and top teams Racing Club de France (3–2) and RC Lens were defeated in January 1953, 1956, and 1961. In 1958, Caen pushed FC Nantes to play five games to decide: the first three games resulting in 0–0 draws, the fourth was stopped, the fifth saw Nantes win 1–0. Through its success Caen won the "Challenge France-Football" rewarding the best amateur team in Coupe de France in 1956 and 1961. Undermined by the instability of its coaches and presidents and a precarious financial health, Stade Malherbe weakened gradually and was relegated twice (in 1962 and 1965) into Division d'Honneur, but regained its place in CFA.

In 1970, the CFA was removed and the Division 2 was enlarged to 48 teams. During the 1970s, Caen evolved between D3 and D2, where it failed to stabilise. Jacques Mouilleron became coach in 1973. In 1975, the club won its first national title: the West group of Division 3. Stade Malherbe was named best amateur club by France-Football and Jean-Paul Bouffandeau and Jean-Paul Pottier were named French amateur players of the year in 1975 and 1976. 3 years later, Caen fell back to D3.

Pierre Mankowski was hired as player-coach in 1983. He led Stade Malherbe from D3 to the top of D2 in a few seasons, and pushed it to adopt professional status in 1985.

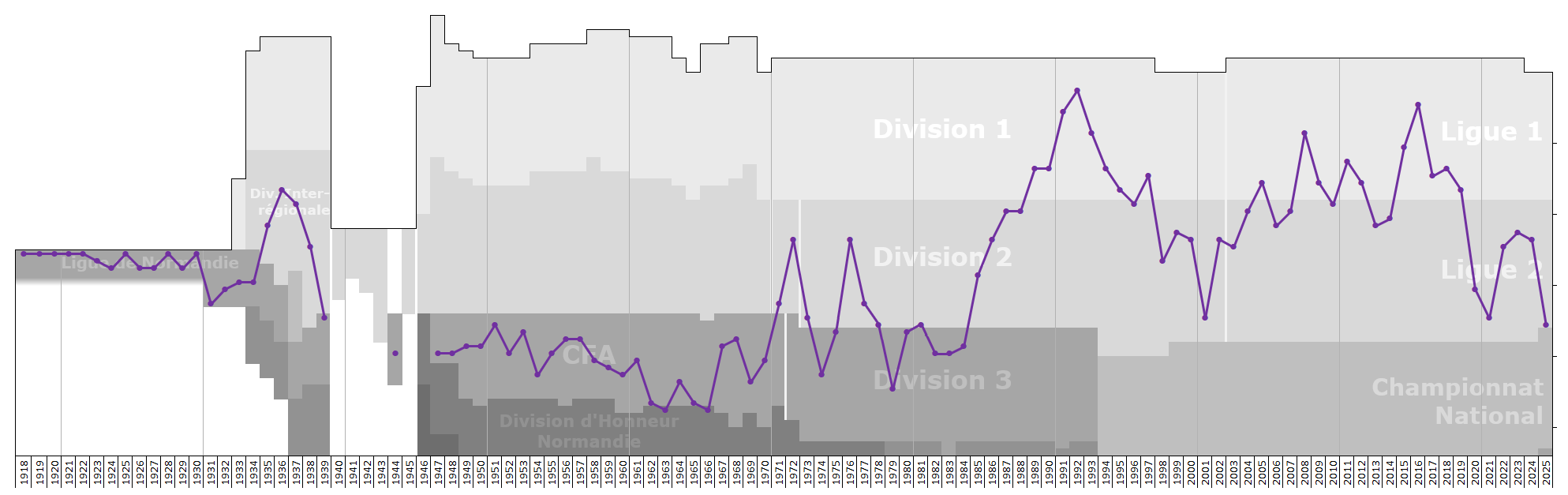
Historical league performance chart of SM Caen

=== From D2 to the European Cup (1985–1993) ===
SM Caen has been a professional football club since 1985. The stated objective of Mankowski was to bring Caen into the first division. He helped the team improve, first in defence then in attack. Caen finished sixth in D2 in 1986 and second in 1987, with notable scorers Philippe Prieur and Éric Pécout. Caen made the stade de Venoix an unbeatable place but bowed out in front of AS Cannes in the playoffs. Caen succeeded in the playoffs following season, defeating Olympique Lyonnais and Chamois Niortais F.C., relegated from D1.

In 1988 Stade Malherbe made Division 1. Despite many departures, including coach Mankowski (replaced by Robert Nouzaret) and six first losses, Caen stayed up, one point ahead of RC Strasbourg, with the advent of a promising striker Fabrice Divert. Stade Malherbe confirmed, not without difficulties, its performance the following season.

With a new coach, Daniel Jeandupeux, the team was largely restructured. In 1990–91, Caen took its place in the first half of Division 1, thanks to the excellent results obtained in Venoix. However, the press revealed in late 1991 that the club was close to bankruptcy. Regional businesses and local government bailed out the club, which led to a brilliant 1991–92 season. Stade Malherbe finished fifth and qualified for the first (and so far only) time for the UEFA Cup. Stéphane Paille scored 15 goals during the season. For the first round of the 1992–93 UEFA Cup, Caen had to face up to Real Zaragoza. Caen won 3–2 in the 1st leg but lost 2–0 in Spain. Despite the goals of Xavier Gravelaine, SM Caen finished the season in a relatively disappointing eleventh rank.

=== Between First and Second Division until relegation to Third Division (1993–2025) ===
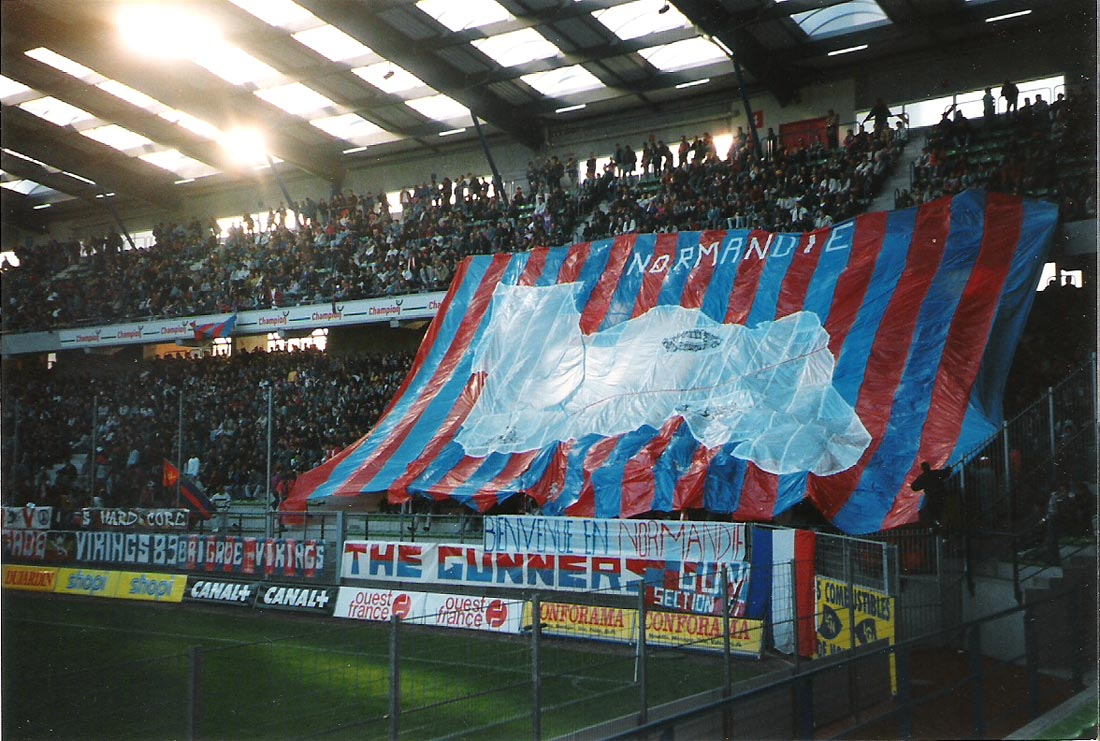
Tifo at Stade Michel d'Ornano for Normandy derby in 1995.

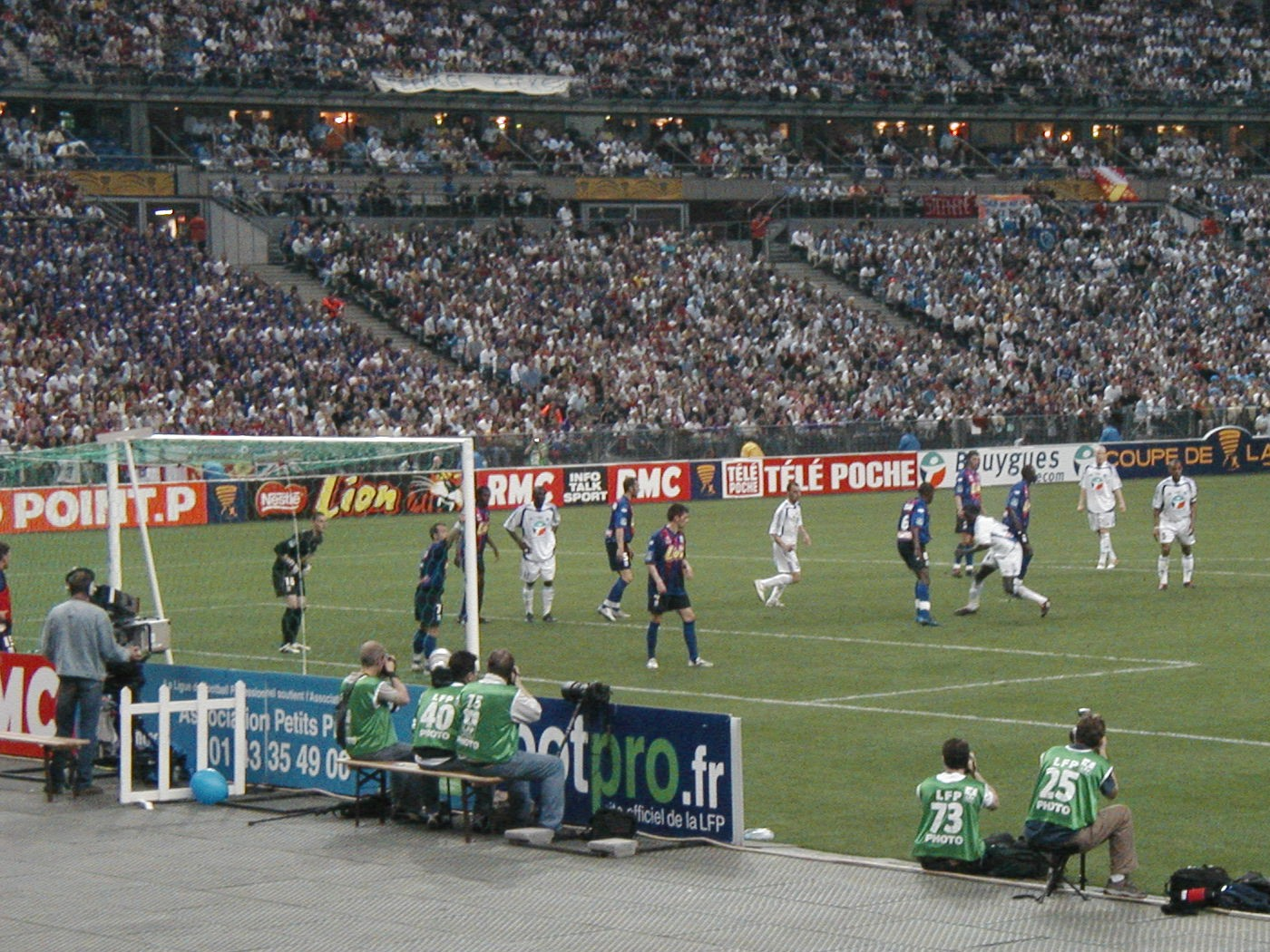
Coupe de la Ligue Final in 2005.

In the 2003–04 season, Caen finished 2nd in Ligue 2, gaining promotion to Ligue 1. They were relegated on the last day of the 2004–05 Ligue 1 season, finishing in 18th place despite some positive results, including a surprise 3–2 away win at Marseille. But the main highlight of their season was making it into the final of the Coupe de la Ligue for the first time in their history. Their chance at a major trophy eluded them however, as they lost 2–1 to Strasbourg in the final.

On 25 May 2007, SM Caen obtained promotion to Ligue 1 after a victory in last game at Libourne (1–2). In the 2008–09 season, the team was once again relegated to Ligue 2 after losing 1–0 at home to Bordeaux, but won championship next season and thus came back to Ligue 1.

In the 2010–11 season, Caen got off to a highly impressive start by defeating defending champions Marseille 2–1 away on the first day of the season, then following it up with a 3–2 home win over the previous season's Champions League semi-finalists Lyon.

In the 2013–14 season, Caen were in Ligue 2, but won promotion to Ligue 1 for the 2014–15 season. As part of their promotion battle, they drew a crucial match with Nîmes in May 2014. This 1–1 result was also very favourable to Nîmes who were battling to avoid relegation. This result raised suspicions, and in November 2014, Caen chairman Fortin was arrested, amongst several others, on suspicion of match fixing. Finally, he was cleared in March 2015. For the 2016–17 and 2017–18 seasons, Caen avoided relegation to Ligue 2 on both occasions by securing a draw on the final day of the season against Paris Saint-Germain.

In the 2018–19 season, Caen were relegated on the final day of the campaign after losing to Bordeaux 1–0. Caen needed to win the match and hope that results elsewhere would go in their favour. The relegation ended Caen's five-year stay in the top division.

In September 2024, French star Kylian Mbappé became the majority owner of the club.

In December 2024, Josselin Flamand is appointed as a new Managing Director.

On 19 April 2025, Caen suffered relegation to Championnat National for the next season after defeat to FC Martigues 0-3 at home, and ended 41 consecutive years in the top 2 divisions.

== Honours ==
National	Regional, youth, and international
Championnat de France/Ligue 1: Best performance: 5th (1991–92): Championnat de France de Division 2/Ligue 2 (2): Champion: 1995–96, 2009–10 Runners-up: 1986–87* (group A), 1987–88* (group B), 2003–04*, 2006–07*: Coupe de France: Best performance: Semi-finals (2017–18): Coupe de la Ligue: Final: 2004–05: Division 3 (2): Champion : 1975, 1980 (groupe Ouest)	Normandy championship: Champion: 1939, 1947, 1948, 1963, 1966: Lower Normandy championship: Champion: 1914, 1920, 1921, 1922, 1923, 1925, 1928: Coupe Gambardella: Final: 1959, 1994, 2001, 2022: Coupe des Cadets: Winner: 1973: UEFA Intertoto Cup: Final: 1992 (group 6)

* denotes promotion without winning the championship.

Domestic record

Year	Division	Place	Played	Won	Drawn	Lost	G.F.	G.A.	G.D.	Points
1934–35	Second League	11th	26	9	3	14	61	57	+4	21
1935–36	Second League	6th	34	17	5	12	68	57	+11	39
1936–37	Second League	8th	32	12	7	13	44	53	−9	31
1937–38	Second League	14th	30	N/A	N/A	N/A	N/A	N/A	N/A	23
1970–71	Division 2 – B	15th	30	8	6	16	29	46	−17	22
1971–72	Division 2 – A	6th	30	12	9	9	32	36	−4	33
1972–73	Division 2 – A	17th	34	8	7	19	37	65	−28	23
1975–76	Division 2 – A	6th	34	16	8	10	54	48	+6	43
1976–77	Division 2 – B	15th	34	11	8	15	43	51	−8	30
1977–78	Division 2 – B	18th	34	6	8	20	29	66	−37	20
1980–81	Division 2 – B	18th	34	6	10	18	25	58	−33	22
1984–85	Division 2 – A	11th	34	11	11	12	33	40	−7	33
1985–86	Division 2 – B	6th	34	14	9	11	33	31	+2	37
1986–87	Division 2 – A	2nd	34	21	6	7	62	30	+32	48
1987–88	Division 2 – B	2nd	34	20	9	5	54	22	+32	49
1988–89	First League	16th	38	10	10	18	39	60	−21	40
1989–90	First League	16th	38	12	10	16	34	48	−14	34
1990–91	First League	8th	38	13	12	13	38	36	+2	38
1991–92	First League	5th	38	17	10	11	46	45	+1	44
1992–93	First League	11th	38	13	9	16	55	54	+1	35
1993–94	First League	16th	38	12	7	19	29	54	−25	31
1994–95	First League	19th	38	10	6	22	38	58	−20	36
1995–96	Second League	1st	42	24	9	9	59	34	+25	81
1996–97	First League	17th	38	7	16	15	35	46	−11	37
1997–98	Second League	9th	42	15	11	16	61	55	+6	56
1998–99	Second League	5th	38	16	11	11	47	39	+8	59
1999–00	Second League	6th	38	12	17	9	50	37	+13	53
2000–01	Second League	17th	38	11	10	17	38	53	−15	43
2001–02	Second League	6th	38	16	10	12	59	55	+4	58
2002–03	Second League	7th	38	12	16	10	45	40	+5	52
2003–04	Second League	2nd	38	20	11	7	56	31	+25	71
2004–05	First League	18th	38	10	12	16	36	60	−24	42
2005–06	Second League	4th	38	18	12	8	56	35	+21	66
2006–07	Second League	2nd	38	19	14	5	65	40	+25	71
2007–08	First League	11th	38	13	12	13	48	53	−5	51
2008–09	First League	18th	38	8	13	17	42	49	−7	37
2009–10	Second League	1st	38	18	15	5	52	30	+22	69
2010–11	First League	15th	38	11	13	14	46	51	−5	46
2011–12	First League	18th	38	9	11	18	39	59	−20	38
2012–13	Second League	4th	38	17	12	9	48	28	+20	63
2013–14	Second League	3rd	38	18	10	10	65	44	+21	64
2014–15	First League	13th	38	12	10	16	54	55	−1	46
2015–16	First League	7th	38	16	6	16	39	52	−13	54
2016–17	First League	17th	38	10	7	21	36	65	−29	37
2017–18	First League	16th	38	10	8	20	27	52	−25	38

== Club crest and colours ==
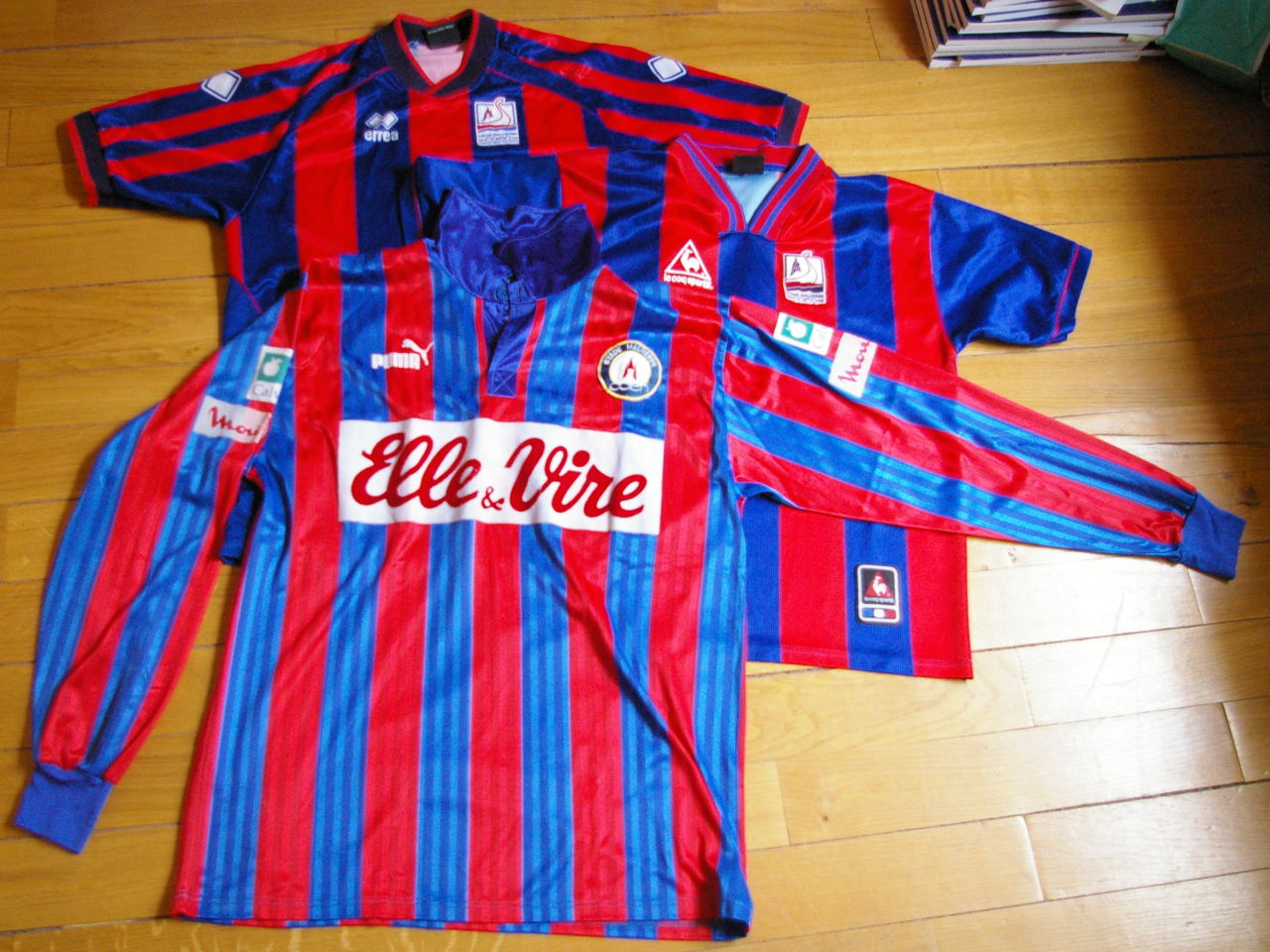
SM Caen Shirts (1992, 2002 and 2005).

Club Malherbe Caennais wore a black and white vertical stripes jersey, while Club Sportif Caennais used blue and red horizontal stripes. Following the merger of two clubs in 1913, the officials decided to mix colours and symbols by adopting the CMC vertical stripes and CSC colours.

Stade Malherbe used the same diamond shaped logo for almost fifty years, designed for its first professional period in 1934.

In 1989, a new logo was designed, with a longship floating on the waves, a nod to the Viking origin of Normandy, and three arrows of the city of Caen. It was used in various versions for eighteen seasons, including within a shield in the 2006–07 season. In 2007, officials presented a new logo. The new logo reflects the identity of the club, closely linked to the Norman period of William the Conqueror: the flag of Normandy, which is actually the historical Norman flag of the Two Lions, can be often seen in the Kop Normandy. In 2013, the official anthem of SM Caen "Normands, fiers et conquérants!" was made with a marked reference to the Norman identity:

"Représenter la Normandie est un honneur
Derrière nos léopards nous chanterons en cœur!
Décrire cette belle région
Doit se faire à l'unisson
Nous sommes Normands, fiers et conquérant!
Portons les couleurs du Stade Malherbe de Caen,
et c'est à d'Ornano que nous allons chantant
Nous sommes de la même famille,
Tous unis à domicile,
Nous sommes Normands fiers et conquérants!"

English:
"Representing Normandy is an honour,
Backing our leopards, we sing our hearts out!
Describing this beautiful region
must be done together
We are Normans, proud and conquerors!
We wear the colours of SM Caen
And we go singing to d'Ornano
We are from the same family,
All united at home,
We are Normans, proud and conquerors!"

SM Caen crests
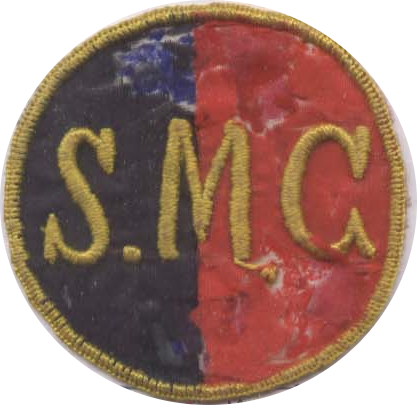
1913–1930

1934–1988

2013–2016

== Stadiums ==
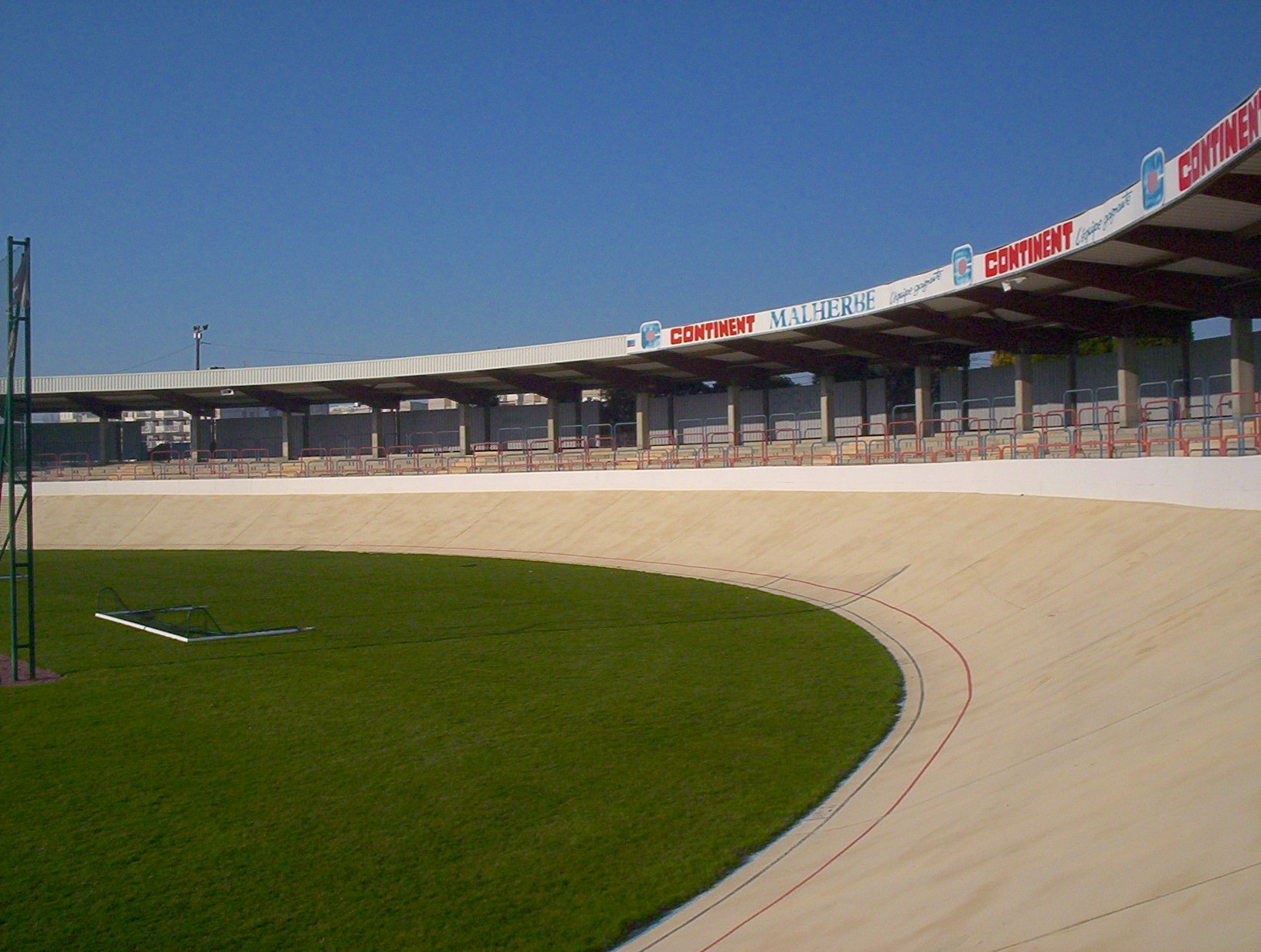
Venoix

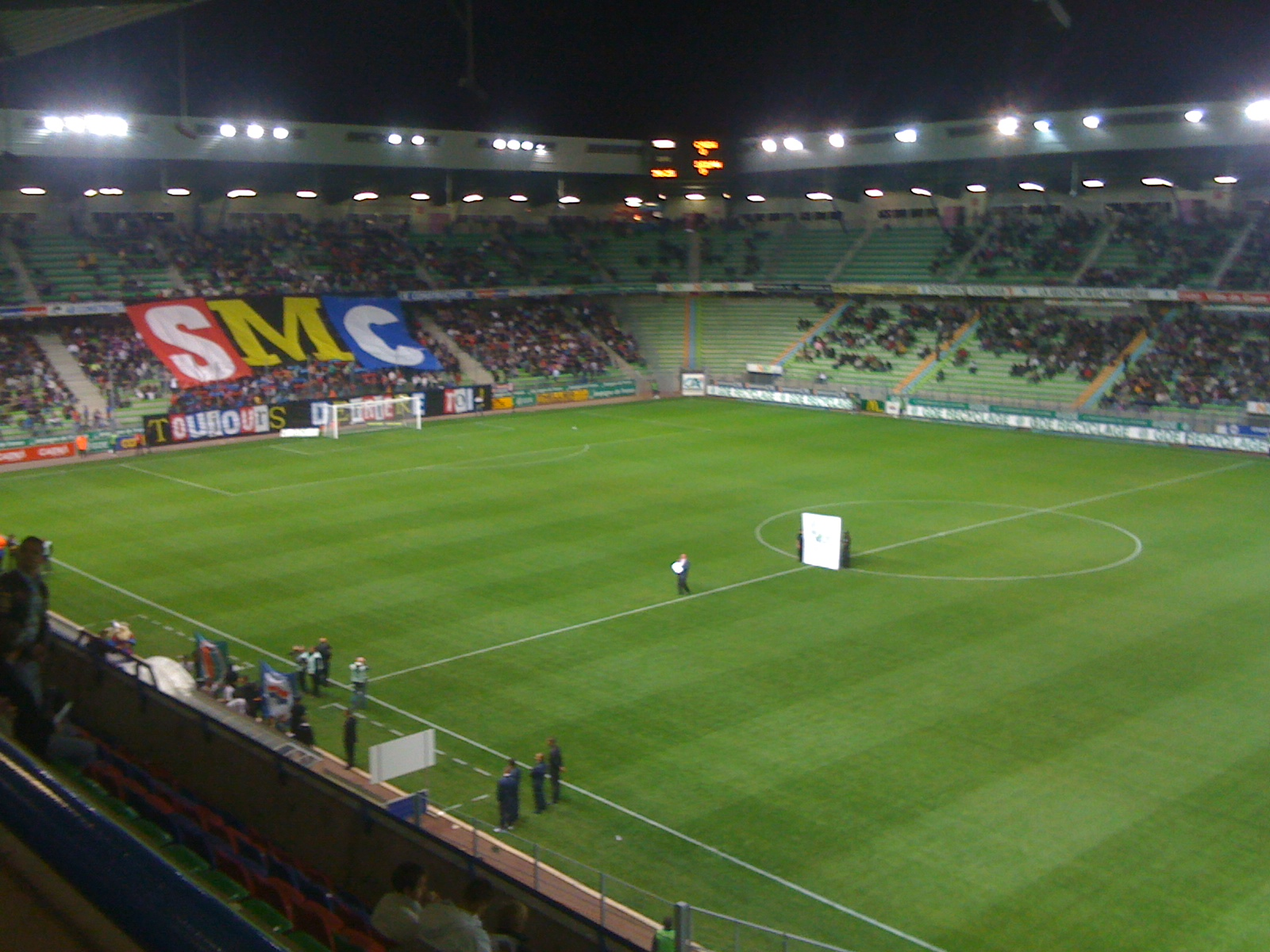
d'Ornano

Caen stadium pictures

Stade de Venoix was the club's home from 1913, although the first stand was built only in 1925, until 1993. Venoix could hold over 15,000 spectators at its peak, and now has a capacity of 5,000.

In 1993 a new 21,500-capacity stadium was built, named Stade Michel d'Ornano. The new stadium is around 500 meters away from the Stade de Venoix.

== Players ==
=== Current squad ===
As of 5 September 2026.

Note: Flags indicate national team as defined under FIFA eligibility rules; some limited exceptions apply. Players may hold more than one non-FIFA nationality.

No.	Pos.	Nation	Player
1	GK	ALG	Anthony Mandrea
2	DF	FRA	Nassim Titebah
3	DF	FRA	Diabé Bolumbu
4	DF	CAF	Sacha M'Baka
6	MF	COD	Josué Kimboma
8	FW	MAD	Samuel Noireau-Dauriat
9	FW	FRA	Fahd El Khoumisti
10	FW	FRA	Ivann Botella
11	FW	CIV	Armand Gnanduillet
12	DF	FRA	Dennis Appiah
13	DF	ALG	Nazim Babaï
16	GK	MTQ	Yannis Clementia
18	MF	SUI	Freddy Bomo

No.	Pos.	Nation	Player
19	DF	FRA	Hugo Lamouliatte
20	FW	FRA	Keelyan Portut
21	MF	FRA	Gabin Tomé
22	FW	MAR	Mohamed Hafid
23	DF	FRA	Lionel Carole
24	MF	FRA	Léo Milliner
25	MF	FRA	Zoumana Bagbema
27	MF	MAR	Mohamed El Idrissi
29	FW	FRA	Salim Diakité
30	GK	COD	Parfait Mandanda
40	GK	COD	Ryan Tutu
—	MF	SEN	Henri Saivet

=== Notable former players ===
Most capped players
Name	Matches	(D1/L1)
Nicolas Seube	477	232
Anthony Deroin	395	93
Yvan Lebourgeois	391	200
Jimmy Hebert	321	38
Christophe Point	301	172

Top scorers
Name	Goals	(D1/L1)
Cyrille Watier	69	9
Xavier Gravelaine	45	26
Fabrice Divert	44	40
Sébastien Mazure	43	13
Anthony Deroin	38	9

French internationals
Name	Caps
Xavier Gravelaine	3 (1992–93)
Fabrice Divert	1 (1990)
Steve Savidan	1 (2008)

last update : summer 2010
(only D2, D1 and cups matches)

== Coaching & technical staff ==
Position	Name
Manager	(Armenia) Michel Der Zakarian
Assistant Manager	(France) David Bechkoura
Goalkeeping Coach	(France) Eddy Costil
Fitness Coach	(France) Jean-Marc Branger

=== Coaching history ===
Years	Coach
1934–35	François Konya
1935–36	Jean Gast
1936–38	Maurice Cottenet
1938–44	Jean Gast
1944–46	Karoly Mayer
1946–47	Armand Deruaz
1947–49	Charles Carville
1949–52	Jules Vandooren
1952–53	Jean Prouff
1953–55	Eugène Proust
1955–58	André Grillon
1958–59	Marcel Leperlier
1959–61	Louis Require
1961–62	Albert Eloy
1962–64	Marcel Mouchel
1964–67	Jean Vincent

Years	Coach
1967–72	Célestin Oliver
1972–72	Bernard Lelong
1972	Guy Lunel (interim)
1972–73	Émile Rummelhardt
1973–79	Jacques Mouilleron
1979–83	Alain Laurier
1983–88	Pierre Mankowski
1988–89	Robert Nouzaret
1989–94	Daniel Jeandupeux
1994–96	Pierre Mankowski
1996–97	Guy David
1997	Gabriel Calderon
1997	Daniel Jeandupeux (interim)
1997–2000	Pascal Théault
2000	Christophe Desbouillons (interim)
2000–01	Jean-Louis Gasset

Years	Coach
2001–02	Hervé Gauthier
2002–05	Patrick Remy
2005	Franck Dumas (interim)
2005–09	Franck Dumas & Patrick Parizon
2009–12	Franck Dumas & Patrice Garande
2012–18	Patrice Garande
2018–19	Fabien Mercadal
2019	Rui Almeida
2019–21	Pascal Dupraz
2021	Fabrice Vandeputte
2021–23	Stéphane Moulin
2023	Jean-Marc Furlan
2023–24	Nicolas Seube
2024–25	Bruno Baltazar
2025–present	Michel Der Zakarian

== European record ==
Season	Competition	Round	Club	Home	Away	Aggregate
1992	UEFA Intertoto Cup	Group stage	(Denmark) Lyngby BK	1–0	1–2	2nd
1992	UEFA Intertoto Cup	Group stage	(Netherlands) RKC Waalwijk	2–0	0–1	2nd
1992	UEFA Intertoto Cup	Group stage	(Germany) Schalke 04	1–1	1–1	2nd
1992–93	UEFA Cup	First Round	(Spain) Real Zaragoza	3–2	0–2	3–4
