= Christel Kimbembe =

Congolese footballer

Personal information
- Date of birth: 23 May 1982 (age 44)
- Place of birth: Brazzaville, Republic of the Congo
- Height: 1.78 m (5 ft 10 in)
- Position: Defender

Senior career*
Years	Team	Apps	(Gls)
1998–1999	Diables Noirs		
1999–2000	Abeille		
2000–2002	Massy FC		
2002–2007	US Créteil	48	(0)
2007–2009	AS Cherbourg	61	(3)
2010–2014	UJA Alfortville		

International career
1996-2010	Congo	28	(0)
- * Club domestic league appearances and goals

Christel Kimbembe (born 23 May 1982, in Brazzaville) is a Congolese football defender who currently plays for UJA Alfortville.

He is a regular player for the Congo national football team.

== Clubs ==
- 1998-1999: (Republic of the Congo) Diables Noirs
- 1999-2000: (Republic of the Congo) Abeille
- 2000-2002: (France) Massy FC
- 2002-2007: (France) US Créteil
- 2007-2009: (France) AS Cherbourg
- 2010- : (France) UJA Alfortville
