= Patrick Rémy (footballer) =

French footballer and manager (born 1954)

Personal information
- Date of birth: 25 August 1954 (age 72)
- Place of birth: Béchy, France
- Position: Striker

Youth career
- 1968–1971: Béchy
- 1971–1973: Metz

Senior career*
| Years | Team | Apps | (Gls) |
| 1973–1979 | Metz | 84 | (8) |
| 1979–1982 | Auxerre | 87 | (13) |
| 1982–1984 | Marseille | 33 | (1) |
| Total | | 204 | (22) |

Managerial career
- 1984–1987: Marseille (youth academy)
- 1987–1995: Beauvais (youth academy)
- 1995–1996: Beauvais
- 1996–1997: Beauvais (youth academy)
- 1997–1998: Beauvais (scout)
- 1998–2000: Sedan
- 2000–2001: Gent
- 2002–2005: Caen
- 2006–2007: Guingamp
- 2009–2010: Troyes
- * Club domestic league appearances and goals

Patrick Rémy (born 25 August 1954) is a French former professional football player and manager.

== Career ==
He played for Metz, Auxerre and Marseille.

He coached Beauvais, Sedan, Gent, Caen and Guingamp.

He joined Troyes AC in June 2009 and was dismissed in June 2010, despite managing promotion to Ligue 2.
