= Pape Hamadou N'Diaye =

Senegalese footballer

Personal information
- Full name: Pape Hamadou N'Diaye
- Date of birth: July 24, 1977 (age 49)
- Place of birth: Rufisque, Senegal
- Height: 1.90 m (6 ft 3 in)
- Position: Defender

Senior career*
| Years | Team | Apps | (Gls) |
| 1997–2000 | Port Autonome | | |
| 2001–2004 | Grenoble | 66 | (4) |
| 2004–2011 | AS Cherbourg | 86 | (2) |

International career
| 1999 | Senegal | 2 | (0) |
- * Club domestic league appearances and goals

Pape Hamadou (or Amadou) N'Diaye (born July 24, 1977) is a Senegalese professional footballer who played as a defender. Having begun his career with Port Autonome, he moved to France in 2011 to play on the professional level in Ligue 2 for Grenoble Foot 38. He ended his career with Championnat de France amateur side AS Cherbourg Football.
