= Rail Club du Kadiogo =

Association football club

- Full name: Rail Club du Kadiogo
- Nickname: Les Faucons
- Founded: 1967
- Ground: Stade de Kadiogo; Ouagadougou
- Capacity: 25,000
- Chairman: Amadou Traoré
- Manager: Souleymane Dabiré
- League: Burkinabé Premier League
- 2024–25: 12th
Home colours	Away colours

Rail Club du Kadiogo is a Burkinabé football and basketball club based in Ouagadougou. They play their home games at the Stade de Kadiogo.

The club plays wearing orange and black uniforms.

== Honours ==
- Burkinabé Premier League: 4

2004–05, 2015–16, 2016–17, 2021–22

- Coupe du Faso: 3

1994, 2012, 2016

- Burkinabé SuperCup: 2

2012, 2016

== Performance in CAF competitions ==
- CAF Champions League: 1 appearance

2006 - Preliminary Round

- CAF Cup Winners' Cup: 7 appearances

1976 - First Round
1977 - Quarter-Finals
1978 - Semi-Finals
1979 - Quarter-Finals
1980 - Semi-Finals
1981 - First Round
1993 - First Round

== Current squad ==
Note: Flags indicate national team as defined under FIFA eligibility rules; some limited exceptions apply. Players may hold more than one non-FIFA nationality.

No.	Pos.	Nation	Player
—	DF	BFA	Mahamadi Kaba
—	DF	IRN	Khaled Shafiei

No.	Pos.	Nation	Player
—	MF	BFA	Oumar Barro
—	FW	NIG	Saidou Idrissa

== Notable players ==
- (Burkina Faso) Harouna Bamogo
- (Burkina Faso) Jeannot Bouyain
- (Burkina Faso) Siaka Coulibaly
- (Burkina Faso) Eric Dagbei
- (Burkina Faso) Derra Hamadou
- (Burkina Faso) Bèbè Kambou
- (Burkina Faso) Constant Kambou
- (Burkina Faso) Ibrahim Kano
- (Burkina Faso) Amara Ouattara
- (Burkina Faso) Seydou Traoré
- (Burkina Faso) Ernest Yélémou
- (Niger) Hamidou Djibo
- (Niger) Saidou Idrissa
- (Niger) Alhassan Issoufou
- (Niger) Idrissa Laouali
- (Niger) Ibrahim Tankary

== Basketball team ==
The club's also has a basketball team that plays in the Burkinabé Men's Basketball Championship, and has traditionally been one of the country's elite teams alongside AS Sonabhy. RCK has won the league championship in 2016, 2017, 2018 and 2019.
