= Raineri =

Raineri is a surname. Notable people with the surname include:

- Alex J. Raineri (1918–1994), American lawyer, politician, and judge
- Faustino Raineri (died 1755), Italian painter
- Francesco Maria Raineri (1676–1758), Italian painter
- Ricardo Raineri (born 1961), Chilean economist, academic, researcher, consultant, and politician
- Rodrigo Raineri (1969–2024), Brazilian mountain climber and entrepreneur
- Simone Raineri (born 1977), Italian competition rower and Olympic champion
- Claudio Raineri (born 1951), Italian football manager. Known for managing Leicester in their 2015/16 title winning season.
- Rainerius, patron saint of Pisa
