= Yuri Boukoff =

Bulgarian-French pianist (1923–2006)

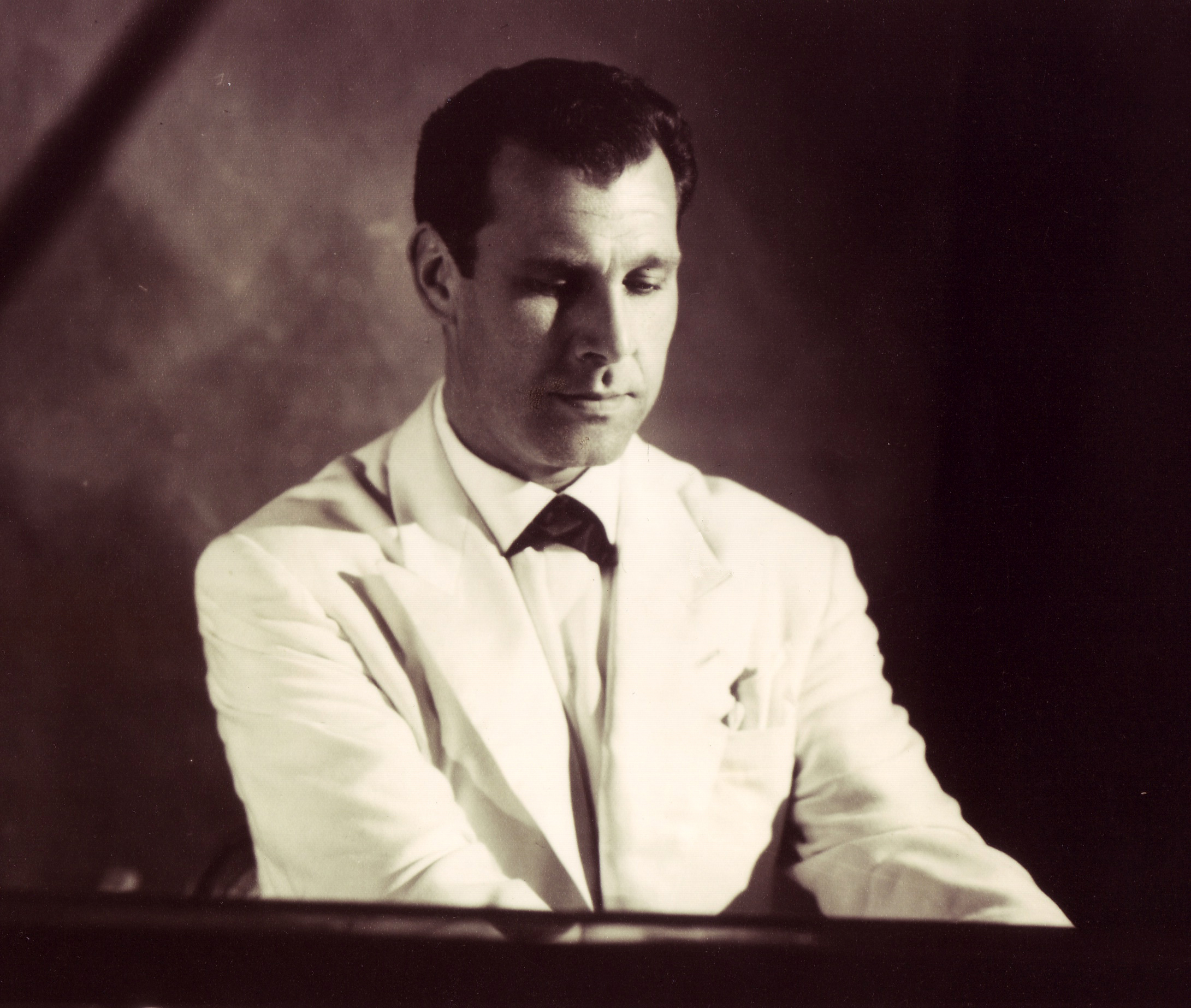

Yuri Boukoff (Bulgarian: Юри Буков; May 1, 1923 – January 8, 2006) was a Bulgarian-French pianist. He was born in Sofia, Bulgaria and died in Neuilly-sur-Seine, Hauts-de-Seine, France.

In 1956, he was the first European pianist to tour China. In 1964, he became a naturalized French citizen. He pursued studies with Yves Nat at the Conservatoire National Supérieur de Musique de Paris and won the first prize in 1946. He was taught by George Enescu, Edwin Fischer, and Marguerite Long. He won many prizes at international competitions, including Geneva in 1947, Long-Thibaud in 1949, and Diemer in 1951. He won eighth prize at the Queen Elisabeth Competition in 1952. His nickname was "Rubinstein of Bulgaria".

== Partial discography ==
- n.d. Piano Concerto no. 5 in E flat, "Emperor", op. 73 by Beethoven, with Pierre Dervaux and L'Orchestre des Concerts Colonnes (World Record Club TP239 mono, also STP 239 stereo
- 1953 piano pieces by Balakirev, Prokofiev, Rachmaninoff, Scriabin and Khachaturian (Philips, A76700R)
- 1955 Hungarian Rhapsody no. 2 and poetic Capriccios no. 2 and 3 by Liszt (Philips A76706R)
- 1960 Sonatas "Appassionnata", "Pathetic" and "Moonlight" by Beethoven (GO3059L Philips)
- 1960 Piano Concertos no. 1 in E Flat & no. 2 In A by Liszt (Philips, SABL 159 also 835 031 AY)
- 1962 Piano Concerto no. 5 in E flat, "Emperor", op. 73 by Beethoven with Georges Prêtre (CC 507 B 13 061)
- 1956-57 Piano sonatas 1-4 by Prokofiev CLP 1812 (reviewed in 'Gramophone', January 1965) (reissued by Forgotten Records in 2012)
- 1956-57 Piano sonatas 5-7 by Prokofiev CLP 1827 (reviewed in 'Gramophone', March 1965) (reissued by Forgotten Records in 2012)
- 1956-57 Piano sonatas 8 and 9 by Prokofiev CLP 1835 (reviewed in 'Gramophone', March 1965) (reissued by Forgotten Records in 2012)
- 1976 Sonata in A major for violin and piano by César Franck and Sonata for Violin and Piano no. 2 op. 77 Ravel, recorded with the young violinist Nell Gotkovsky (RCA Red Seal FRL10120)
- 1970 Concerto no. 2 for piano and orchestra by Tchaikovsky with the Conservatory Orchestra under the direction of Romansky
- 1980 Symphonic Studies op. 13 and Fantaisie op. 17 Schumann (MET2599.015)
- 1970s Bach, including the Italian Concerto BWV 971, the Chromatic Fantasy and Fugue BWV 903, Prelude and Fugue BWV 894, Sonata and Partita BWV 1004 and the famous figured chorale: Jesu, joy remains from Cantata BWV 147 (MET2599.005)
- 1980s Sonatas for Piano, Violin, Cello by Richard Strauss (Adda Records)
- "Anthology of Russian music" (Mussorgsky, Tchaikovsky) (Adda Records)

== Family ==
Widow Evelyne (singer and novelist), son George Boukoff (philosopher by training, pianist and clarinetist), Yana Boukoff (singer, mezzo-soprano)
