= Christel Augenstein =

German politician (born 1949)

Mayor of Pforzheim
- In office 2001–2009

Personal details
- Born: 15 July 1949 (age 76) Erfurt, Germany
- Party: Free Democratic Party

Christel Augenstein (born 15 July 1949 in Erfurt, Germany) is a member of the Free Democratic Party. From 2001 until 23 July 2009 she was the mayor of Pforzheim, Germany, making her the city's first woman mayor. When the city of Pforzheim had already been in a bad financial position she took over the mayor's office from Joachim Becker (SPD) and tried her best to maneuver out. Becker was the ruling mayor of Pforzheim from 1985 until 2000.

The current major is Peter Boch of the Christian Democratic Union of Germany.
