= Saint-Christol =

Saint-Christol is the name or part of the name of several communes in France:

- Saint-Christol, Ardèche, in the Ardèche department
- Saint-Christol, Hérault, in the Hérault department
- Saint-Christol, Vaucluse, in the Vaucluse department
- Saint-Christol-de-Rodières, in the Gard department
- Saint-Christol-lès-Alès, in the Gard department

Others:

- Saint-Christol AOC, a wine area in the Languedoc wine region of France.
