= Pierre Nerini =

Pierre Emmanuel Nerini (7 October 1915 – 27 February 2006) was a French classical violinist and music teacher who held prominent positions with leading Parisian orchestras.

== Biography ==
Nerini was born in the 14th arrondissement of Paris, in a family of musicians from Milan. His father was Emmanuel Nerini who gave his name to a music competition. He studied at the Conservatoire de Paris where he obtained a first prize in violin and an accessit in harmony. During his musical career he was a member of various orchestras including the Orchestre Lamoureux and the Pasdeloup Orchestra. From 1945 to 1965, he was concertmaster at the Opéra de Paris.

In June 1945 Nerini was elected to become concertmaster of the Société des Concerts du Conservatoire, which position he held until the dissolution of the orchestra in 1967, playing a Mozart concerto with them the January before closure.

He was also a violin teacher at the Conservatoire de Versailles from 1957 to 1967 and at the Conservatoire de Paris from 1965 to 1985. He wrote several books about violin teaching.

Among Nerini's recordings are the solo violin part in Rimsky-Korsakov's Scheherazade Op.35 with the Paris Conservatoire Orchestra under Ernest Ansermet in 1948 and 1954 (Decca), solos in music from Sylvia by Delibes with the Conservatoire Orchestra under Roger Désormière in 1950 (Decca), in Rimsky-Korsakov's Russian Easter Festival Overture and Capriccio Espagnol with the Conservatoire Orchestra under André Cluytens in 1953 (Pathé), and in Tchaikovsky's Suite No. 3 In G Major Op. 55 with the Conservatoire Orchestra under Adrian Boult in 1955 (Decca). In 1963 he played the violin part in a recording for EMI of Falla's harpsichord concerto with Gonzalo Soriano, and Rafael Frühbeck de Burgos conducting the Conservatoire orchestra. With his wife Jeanine Nerini he recorded Dohnànyi's Ruralia Hungarica suite op. 32 with Columbia in 1945, and Beethoven's Spring sonata Op.24 on Pacific PIA 1518.

Nerini died in Paris on 27 February 2006 at age 90.

== Nerini Competition ==
In 1960, Nerini became director of the Nerini competition founded by his father to reward talented and promising young musicians (pianists, violinists, flutists). The competition only survived two years after Nerini's death since its last edition took place in 2007 under the aegis of Annick Nerini, Nerini's daughter.
