= 1993–94 Paris Saint-Germain FC season =

24th season in existence of Paris Saint-Germain

Paris Saint-Germain
1993–94 season
- President: Michel Denisot
- Manager: Artur Jorge
- Stadium: Parc des Princes
- Division 1: 1st
- Coupe de France: Quarter-finals
- European Cup Winners' Cup: Semi-finals
- Top goalscorer: League: David Ginola (13); All: David Ginola (18)
- Average home league attendance: 26,521
Home colours	Away colours	Third colours

The 1993–94 season was Paris Saint-Germain's 24th season in existence. PSG played their home league games at the Parc des Princes in Paris, registering an average attendance of 26,521 spectators per match. The club was presided by Michel Denisot and the team was coached by Artur Jorge. Paul Le Guen was the team captain.

== Players ==
As of the 1993–94 season.

=== Squad ===
Note: Flags indicate national team as defined under FIFA eligibility rules; some limited exceptions apply. Players may hold more than one non-FIFA nationality.

No.	Pos.	Nation	Player
—	GK	FRA	Bernard Lama
—	GK	FRA	Luc Borrelli
—	DF	FRA	Patrick Colleter
—	DF	FRA	Alain Roche
—	DF	FRA	Jean-Luc Sassus
—	DF	FRA	José Cobos
—	DF	BRA	Ricardo
—	DF	FRA	Francis Llacer
—	DF	FRA	Antoine Kombouaré
—	DF	FRA	Jean-Claude Fernandes
—	MF	FRA	Laurent Fournier

No.	Pos.	Nation	Player
—	MF	FRA	Paul Le Guen (captain)
—	MF	FRA	Pierre Reynaud
—	MF	FRA	Daniel Bravo
—	MF	FRA	Vincent Guérin
—	MF	BRA	Valdo
—	MF	FRA	Roméo Calenda
—	MF	FRA	Xavier Gravelaine
—	MF	BRA	Raí
—	FW	FRA	François Calderaro
—	FW	LBR	George Weah
—	FW	FRA	David Ginola

=== Out on loan ===
Note: Flags indicate national team as defined under FIFA eligibility rules; some limited exceptions apply. Players may hold more than one non-FIFA nationality.

No.	Pos.	Nation	Player
—	GK	FRA	Richard Dutruel (at Caen)
—	FW	CMR	Patrick M'Boma (at Châteauroux)

No.	Pos.	Nation	Player
—	FW	FRA	Pascal Nouma (at Caen)

== Transfers ==
As of the 1993–94 season.

=== Arrivals ===
Note: Flags indicate national team as defined under FIFA eligibility rules; some limited exceptions apply. Players may hold more than one non-FIFA nationality.

No.	Pos.	Nation	Player
—	GK	FRA	Luc Borrelli (from Toulon)
—	DF	FRA	José Cobos (from Strasbourg)
—	DF	FRA	Jean-Claude Fernandes (from PSG Academy)
—	MF	FRA	Roméo Calenda (from PSG Academy)

No.	Pos.	Nation	Player
—	MF	FRA	Xavier Gravelaine (from Caen)
—	MF	BRA	Raí (from São Paulo)
—	FW	FRA	Pascal Nouma (from Lille, end of loan)

=== Departures ===
Note: Flags indicate national team as defined under FIFA eligibility rules; some limited exceptions apply. Players may hold more than one non-FIFA nationality.

No.	Pos.	Nation	Player
—	GK	FRA	Richard Dutruel (loaned to Caen)
—	DF	FRA	Bruno Germain (to Angers)
—	FW	FRA	Pascal Nouma (loaned to Caen)

No.	Pos.	Nation	Player
—	FW	FRA	Joël Cloarec (to Valenciennes)
—	FW	FRA	Amara Simba (to Monaco)

== Kits ==
Commodore, Tourtel, and SEAT were the shirt sponsors, and Nike was the kit supplier.

Home	Away	Third

== Competitions ==
=== Overview ===
Competition	First match	Last match	Starting round	Final position	Record							
Competition	First match	Last match	Starting round	Final position	Pld	W	D	L	GF	GA	GD	Win %
Division 1	27 July 1993	21 May 1994	Matchday 1	Winners	38	24	11	3	54	22	+32	63.16
Coupe de France	22 January 1994	23 April 1994	Round of 64	Quarter-finals	4	3	0	1	16	3	+13	75.00
European Cup Winners' Cup	14 September 1993	12 April 1994	First round	Semi-finals	8	5	2	1	12	3	+9	62.50
Total					50	32	13	5	82	28	+54	64.00

Source: Competitions

=== Division 1 ===
==== League table ====
Pos	Team	Pld	W	D	L	GF	GA	GD	Pts	Qualification or relegation
1	Paris Saint-Germain (C)	38	24	11	3	54	22	+32	59	Qualification to Champions League qualifying round
2	Marseille (Note: Olympique de Marseille was administratively relegated to 1994–95 Division 2, forced to relinquish their 1992–93 Division 1 title, and lost their right to play in the 1993–94 UEFA Champions League, the 1993 European Super Cup and the 1993 Intercontinental Cup, due to the Valenciennes FC-OM match fixing scandal. Despite being relegated, OM kept the right to play in the 1994–95 UEFA Cup.) (R)	38	19	13	6	56	33	+23	51	Qualification to UEFA Cup first round but summarily relegated to French Division 2
3	Auxerre (Note: Winner of the 1993–94 Coupe de France competition will qualify for the First round of the 1994–95 UEFA Cup Winners' Cup.)	38	18	10	10	54	29	+25	46	Qualification to Cup Winners' Cup first round
4	Bordeaux	38	19	8	11	54	37	+17	46	Qualification to UEFA Cup first round
5	Nantes	38	17	11	10	47	32	+15	45	Qualification to UEFA Cup first round

Source: Ligue 1
Rules for classification: 1) points; 2) goal difference; 3) number of goals scored.
A win is worth 2 points, with 1 point for a draw and 0 for a loss.
(C) Champions; (R) Relegated

==== Results by round ====
Round	1	2	3	4	5	6	7	8	9	10	11	12	13	14	15	16	17	18	19	20	21	22	23	24	25	26	27	28	29	30	31	32	33	34	35	36	37	38
Ground	A	H	A	H	A	H	A	H	A	H	A	H	A	A	H	A	H	A	H	A	H	A	H	A	H	A	H	A	H	A	H	H	A	H	A	H	A	H
Result	L	W	D	W	L	W	D	W	W	W	D	W	W	W	W	D	D	W	W	W	W	W	D	W	W	D	D	D	D	W	W	W	L	D	W	W	W	W
Position	17	9	7	6	10	7	9	4	2	1	2	1	1	1	1	1	1	1	1	1	1	1	1	1	1	1	1	1	1	1	1	1	1	1	1	1	1	1

Source: Histoire du PSG
A = Away; H = Home; W = Win; D = Draw; L = Loss

==== Matches ====
24 July 1993 1	Bordeaux	1–0	Paris Saint-Germain	Bordeaux
	Zidane 7'	Report		Stadium: Stade Chaban-Delmas; Attendance: 28,751; Referee: Jean-Marie Lartigot

31 July 1993 2	Paris Saint-Germain	2–1	Lille	Paris
	Ginola 28', 37'	Report 1 Report 2	Andersson 46'	Stadium: Parc des Princes; Attendance: 21,540; Referee: Bernard Saules

7 August 1993 3	Strasbourg	2–2	Paris Saint-Germain	Strasbourg
	Sassus 2' (o.g.); Regis 57'	Report	Weah 6'; Roche 47'	Stadium: Stade de la Meinau; Attendance: 27,959; Referee: Didier Pauchard

11 August 1993 4	Paris Saint-Germain	1–0	Sochaux	Paris
	Ginola 50'	Report 1 Report 2		Stadium: Parc des Princes; Attendance: 19,624; Referee: Claude Colombo

15 August 1993 5	Marseille	1–0	Paris Saint-Germain	Marseille
	Bokšić 87'	Report 1 Report 2		Stadium: Stade Vélodrome; Attendance: 33,700; Referee: Georges Ramos

28 August 1993 6	Paris Saint-Germain	2–0	Caen	Paris
	Bravo 48'; Ginola 61'	Report		Stadium: Parc des Princes; Attendance: 20,874; Referee: Philippe Leduc

1 September 1993 7	Angers	1–1	Paris Saint-Germain	Angers
	Germain 35'	Report	Ginola 51'	Stadium: Stade Raymond Kopa; Attendance: 13,083; Referee: Gilles Veissière

11 September 1993 8	Paris Saint-Germain	1–0	Montpellier	Toulouse
	Raí 55'	Report		Stadium: Stadium de Toulouse; Attendance: 25,083; Referee: Alain Sars

18 September 1993 9	Lyon	1–3	Paris Saint-Germain	Lyon
	Colleter 20' (o.g.)	Report	Weah 21'; Ginola 48'; Guérin 90'	Stadium: Stade de Gerland; Attendance: 30,000; Referee: Marc Batta

23 September 1993 10	Paris Saint-Germain	4–0	Auxerre	Paris
	Weah 20', 30'; Le Guen 27'; Ginola 75'	Report 1 Report 2		Stadium: Parc des Princes; Attendance: 24,419; Referee: Gilles Chéron

2 October 1993 11	Martigues	1–1	Paris Saint-Germain	Martigues
	Anziani 6'	Report	Raí 8'	Stadium: Stade Francis Turcan; Attendance: 8,000; Referee: Marcel Lainé

6 October 1993 12	Paris Saint-Germain	1–0	Lens	Paris
	Le Guen 54'	Report 1 Report 2		Stadium: Parc des Princes; Attendance: 19,129; Referee: Antoine de Pandis

16 October 1993 13	Metz	0–1	Paris Saint-Germain	Metz
		Report	Weah 28'	Stadium: Stade Saint-Symphorien; Attendance: 14,833; Referee: Philippe Leduc

23 October 1993 14	Cannes	0–1	Paris Saint-Germain	Cannes
		Report	Guérin 7'	Stadium: Stade Pierre de Coubertin; Attendance: 8,000; Referee: Bernard Saules

29 October 1993 15	Paris Saint-Germain	1–0	Nantes	Paris
	Weah 90+4'	Report 1 Report 2 Report 3		Stadium: Parc des Princes; Attendance: 30,967; Referee: Alain Sars

6 November 1993 16	Monaco	1–1	Paris Saint-Germain	Monaco
	Scifo 54'	Report	Ginola 4'	Stadium: Stade Louis II; Attendance: 8,500; Referee: Georges Ramos

10 November 1993 17	Paris Saint-Germain	0–0	Le Havre	Paris
		Report 1 Report 2		Stadium: Parc des Princes; Attendance: 19,709; Referee: Rémy Harrel

20 November 1993 18	Toulouse	1–2	Paris Saint-Germain	Toulouse
	Kastendeuch 25'	Report	Ginola 12'; Valdo 73'	Stadium: Stadium de Toulouse; Attendance: 13,514; Referee: Gilles Chéron

27 November 1993 19	Paris Saint-Germain	1–0	Saint-Étienne	Paris
	Weah 88'	Report 1 Report 2		Stadium: Parc des Princes; Attendance: 27,682; Referee: Jean-Claude Puyalt

3 December 1993 20	Lille	0–2	Paris Saint-Germain	Lille
		Report 1 Report 2	Raí 34'; Gravelaine 90+1'	Stadium: Stade Grimonprez-Jooris; Attendance: 10,526; Referee: Germain Zagni

11 December 1993 21	Paris Saint-Germain	2–0	Strasbourg	Paris
	Le Guen 17'; Ginola 83'	Report 1 Report 2		Stadium: Parc des Princes; Attendance: 24,404; Referee: Gilles Veissière

18 December 1993 22	Sochaux	1–2	Paris Saint-Germain	Montbéliard
	Vos 6'	Report	Roche 15'; Gravelaine 87'	Stadium: Stade Auguste-Bonal; Attendance: 9,153; Referee: Marc Batta

14 January 1994 23	Paris Saint-Germain	1–1	Marseille	Paris
	Guérin 11'	Report 1 Report 2 Report 3	Völler 14'	Stadium: Parc des Princes; Attendance: 38,884; Referee: Marcel Lainé

29 January 1994 24	Caen	0–2	Paris Saint-Germain	Caen
		Report	Ginola 13'; Le Guen 86'	Stadium: Stade Michel d'Ornano; Attendance: 19,259; Referee: Antoine de Pandis

5 February 1994 25	Paris Saint-Germain	3–0	Angers	Paris
	Guérin 16', 89'; Ginola 66'	Report 1 Report 2		Stadium: Parc des Princes; Attendance: 25,124; Referee: Claude Colombo

9 February 1994 26	Montpellier	0–0	Paris Saint-Germain	Montpellier
		Report		Stadium: Stade de la Mosson; Attendance: 17,750; Referee: Rémy Harrel

19 February 1994 27	Paris Saint-Germain	0–0	Lyon	Paris
		Report 1 Report 2		Stadium: Parc des Princes; Attendance: 29,266; Referee: Philippe Leduc

24 February 1994 28	Auxerre	0–0	Paris Saint-Germain	Auxerre
		Report		Stadium: Stade de l'Abbé-Deschamps; Attendance: 14,000; Referee: Jean-Marie Lartigot

6 March 1994 29	Paris Saint-Germain	2–2	Martigues	Paris
	Raí 46'; Guérin 47'	Report 1 Report 2	Bouquet 35'; Tholot 85'	Stadium: Parc des Princes; Attendance: 23,156; Referee: Didier Pauchard

11 March 1994 30	Lens	1–2	Paris Saint-Germain	Lens
	Omam-Biyik 56' (pen.)	Report	Ricardo 52'; Llacer 81'	Stadium: Stade Bollaert-Delelis; Attendance: 41,000; Referee: Gilles Veissière

26 March 1994 31	Paris Saint-Germain	1–0	Metz	Paris
	Fournier 15'	Report		Stadium: Parc des Princes; Attendance: 26,979; Referee: Germain Zagni

2 April 1994 32	Paris Saint-Germain	2–1	Cannes	Paris
	Weah 30'; Guérin 70'	Report	Madar 8'	Stadium: Parc des Princes; Attendance: 28,957; Referee: Antoine de Pandis

5 April 1994 33	Nantes	3–0	Paris Saint-Germain	Nantes
	Loko 20'; Pedros 67'; Ouédec 70'	Report		Stadium: Stade de la Beaujoire; Attendance: 20,482; Referee: Jean-Marie Lartigot

17 April 1994 34	Paris Saint-Germain	1–1	Monaco	Paris
	Raí 29' (pen.)	Report 1 Report 2	Djorkaeff 90'	Stadium: Parc des Princes; Attendance: 23,914; Referee: Marcel Lainé

26 April 1994 35	Le Havre	0–2	Paris Saint-Germain	Le Havre
		Report	Le Guen 13'; Raí 65'	Stadium: Stade Jules Deschaseaux; Attendance: 15,000; Referee: Marc Batta

30 April 1994 36	Paris Saint-Germain	1–0	Toulouse	Paris
	Ricardo 72'	Report		Stadium: Parc des Princes; Attendance: 33,980; Referee: Rémy Harrel

7 May 1994 37	Saint-Étienne	1–2	Paris Saint-Germain	Saint-Étienne
	Camara 50'	Report	Weah 44', 62'	Stadium: Stade Geoffroy-Guichard; Attendance: 16,088; Referee: Didier Pauchard

21 May 1994 38	Paris Saint-Germain	4–1	Bordeaux	Paris
	Le Guen 20', 23'; Ginola 32'; Weah 72'	Report	Sénac 62'	Stadium: Parc des Princes; Attendance: 40,021; Referee: Jean-Marie Lartigot

=== Coupe de France ===
22 January 1994 Round of 64	Côte Chaude	0–10	Paris Saint-Germain	Saint-Étienne
		Report	Raí 4', 71'; Chatane 15' (o.g.); Ginola 41', 57'; Gravelaine 42', 85', 86'; Le Guen 81'; Fournier 83'	Stadium: Stade Geoffroy-Guichard; Attendance: 30,000; Referee: Alain Lalu

12 February 1994 Round of 32	CS Avion	1–4 (a.e.t.)	Paris Saint-Germain	Lens
	Olczak 32'	Report	Bravo 52'; Ginola 91'; Weah 99'; Calderaro 101'	Stadium: Stade Bollaert-Delelis; Attendance: 19,838; Referee: Serge Léon

19 March 1994 Round of 16	Guingamp	0–1	Paris Saint-Germain	Guingamp
		Report	Weah 43'	Stadium: Stade de Roudourou; Attendance: 14,200; Referee: Bernard Saules

23 April 1994 Quarter-finals	Paris Saint-Germain	1–2	Lens	Paris
	Guérin 25'	Report	Boli 70'; Laigle 72'	Stadium: Parc des Princes; Attendance: 20,223; Referee: Philippe Leduc

=== European Cup Winners' Cup ===
==== First round ====
14 September 1993 First leg	APOEL (Cyprus)	0–1	(France) Paris Saint-Germain	Nicosia, Cyprus
		Report	Sassus 78'	Stadium: Makario Stadium; Attendance: 12,000; Referee: Marnix Sandra (Belgium)

28 September 1993 Second leg	Paris Saint-Germain (France)	2–0 (3–0 agg.)	(Cyprus) APOEL	Paris, France
	Le Guen 1'; Gravelaine 31'	Report		Stadium: Parc des Princes; Attendance: 13,500; Referee: Hartmut Strampe (Germany)

==== Second round ====
20 October 1993 First leg	Paris Saint-Germain (France)	4–0	(Romania) Universitatea Craiova	Paris, France
	Guérin 12'; Ginola 17'; Călin 60' (o.g.); Valdo 72'	Report		Stadium: Parc des Princes; Attendance: 11,364; Referee: Leslie Mottram (Scotland)

3 November 1993 Second leg	Universitatea Craiova (Romania)	0–2 (0–6 agg.)	(France) Paris Saint-Germain	Craiova, Romania
		Report	Guérin 29', 48'	Stadium: Stadionul Central; Attendance: 15,000; Referee: John Blankenstein (Netherlands)

==== Quarter-finals ====
3 March 1994 First leg	Real Madrid (Spain)	0–1	(France) Paris Saint-Germain	Madrid, Spain
21:00		Report	Weah 32'	Stadium: Santiago Bernabéu Stadium; Attendance: 64,000; Referee: Bernd Heynemann (Germany)

15 March 1994 Second leg	Paris Saint-Germain (France)	1–1 (2–1 agg.)	(Spain) Real Madrid	Paris, France
20:30	Ricardo 51'	Report	Butragueño 20'	Stadium: Parc des Princes; Attendance: 45,000; Referee: Vadim Zhuk (Belarus)

==== Semi-finals ====
29 March 1994 First leg	Paris Saint-Germain (France)	1–1	(England) Arsenal	Paris, France
20:30	Ginola 49'	Report	Wright 35'	Stadium: Parc des Princes; Attendance: 48,000; Referee: Leif Sundell (Sweden)

12 April 1994 Second leg	Arsenal (England)	1–0 (2–1 agg.)	(France) Paris Saint-Germain	London, England
19:30	Campbell 7'	Report		Stadium: Arsenal Stadium; Attendance: 34,200; Referee: Peter Mikkelsen (Denmark)

== Statistics ==
As of the 1993–94 season.

=== Appearances and goals ===
No.	Pos	Nat	Player	Total		Division 1		Coupe de France		European Cup Winners' Cup	
No.	Pos	Nat	Player	Apps	Goals	Apps	Goals	Apps	Goals	Apps	Goals
Goalkeepers
	GK	(France) FRA	Bernard Lama	49	0	37	0	4	0	8	0
	GK	(France) FRA	Luc Borrelli	2	0	2	0	0	0	0	0
Defenders
	DF	(France) FRA	Patrick Colleter	42	0	32	0	3	0	7	0
	DF	(France) FRA	Alain Roche	41	2	30	2	4	0	7	0
	DF	(France) FRA	Jean-Luc Sassus	39	1	29	0	2	0	8	1
	DF	(Brazil) BRA	Ricardo	37	3	26	2	4	0	7	1
	DF	(France) FRA	Francis Llacer	30	1	23	1	2	0	5	0
	DF	(France) FRA	José Cobos	18	0	14	0	2	0	2	0
	DF	(France) FRA	Antoine Kombouaré	10	0	9	0	0	0	1	0
	DF	(France) FRA	Jean-Claude Fernandes	1	0	1	0	0	0	0	0
Midfielders
	MF	(France) FRA	Paul Le Guen	48	9	37	7	4	1	7	1
	MF	(France) FRA	Vincent Guérin	45	11	35	7	3	1	7	3
	MF	(Brazil) BRA	Valdo	39	2	30	1	3	0	6	1
	MF	(Brazil) BRA	Raí	36	8	28	6	4	2	4	0
	MF	(France) FRA	Laurent Fournier	36	2	26	1	2	1	8	0
	MF	(France) FRA	Daniel Bravo	32	2	22	1	3	1	7	0
	MF	(France) FRA	Xavier Gravelaine	31	6	21	2	4	3	6	1
	MF	(France) FRA	Pierre Reynaud	1	0	1	0	0	0	0	0
	MF	(France) FRA	Roméo Calenda	1	0	1	0	0	0	0	0
Forwards
	FW	(France) FRA	David Ginola	49	18	38	13	3	3	8	2
	FW	(Liberia) LBR	George Weah	40	14	32	11	3	2	5	1
	FW	(France) FRA	François Calderaro	8	1	7	0	1	1	0	0

Source: Competitions
