= 1992–93 Paris Saint-Germain FC season =

23rd season in existence of Paris Saint-Germain

Paris Saint-Germain
1992–93 season
- President: Michel Denisot
- Manager: Artur Jorge
- Stadium: Parc des Princes
- Division 1: 2nd
- Coupe de France: Winners
- UEFA Cup: Semi-finals
- Top goalscorer: League: George Weah (14); All: George Weah (23)
- Average home league attendance: 26,693
Home colours	Away colours

The 1992–93 season was Paris Saint-Germain's 23rd season in existence. PSG played their home league games at the Parc des Princes in Paris, registering an average attendance of 26,693 spectators per match. The club was presided by Michel Denisot and the team was coached by Artur Jorge. Paul Le Guen was the team captain.

== Players ==
As of the 1992–93 season.

=== Squad ===
Note: Flags indicate national team as defined under FIFA eligibility rules; some limited exceptions apply. Players may hold more than one non-FIFA nationality.

No.	Pos.	Nation	Player
—	GK	FRA	Bernard Lama
—	GK	FRA	Richard Dutruel
—	DF	FRA	Patrick Colleter
—	DF	FRA	Alain Roche
—	DF	FRA	Jean-Luc Sassus
—	DF	FRA	Bruno Germain
—	DF	BRA	Ricardo
—	DF	FRA	Francis Llacer
—	DF	FRA	Antoine Kombouaré
—	MF	FRA	Laurent Fournier

No.	Pos.	Nation	Player
—	MF	FRA	Paul Le Guen (captain)
—	MF	FRA	Pierre Reynaud
—	MF	FRA	Daniel Bravo
—	MF	FRA	Vincent Guérin
—	MF	BRA	Valdo
—	FW	FRA	François Calderaro
—	FW	FRA	Joël Cloarec
—	FW	LBR	George Weah
—	FW	FRA	Amara Simba
—	FW	FRA	David Ginola

=== Out on loan ===
Note: Flags indicate national team as defined under FIFA eligibility rules; some limited exceptions apply. Players may hold more than one non-FIFA nationality.

No. / Pos. / Nation / Player; — / FW / CMR / Patrick M'Boma (at Châteauroux)	No. / Pos. / Nation / Player; — / FW / FRA / Pascal Nouma (at Lille)

== Transfers ==
As of the 1992–93 season.

=== Arrivals ===
Note: Flags indicate national team as defined under FIFA eligibility rules; some limited exceptions apply. Players may hold more than one non-FIFA nationality.

No.	Pos.	Nation	Player
—	GK	FRA	Bernard Lama (from Lens)
—	DF	FRA	Francis De Percin (from PSG Academy)
—	DF	FRA	Alain Roche (from Auxerre)
—	DF	FRA	Jean-Luc Sassus (from Cannes)
—	MF	FRA	Vincent Guérin (from Montpellier)

No.	Pos.	Nation	Player
—	FW	FRA	François Calderaro (from Metz)
—	FW	FRA	Joël Cloarec (from Châteauroux)
—	FW	CMR	Patrick M'Boma (from PSG Academy)
—	FW	LBR	George Weah (from Monaco)

=== Departures ===
Note: Flags indicate national team as defined under FIFA eligibility rules; some limited exceptions apply. Players may hold more than one non-FIFA nationality.

No.	Pos.	Nation	Player
—	GK	FRA	Joël Bats (Retired)
—	GK	FRA	Dominique Leclercq (Retired)
—	DF	FRA	Francis De Percin (to Paris FC)
—	DF	BRA	Geraldão (to América)
—	DF	FRA	Bernard Héréson (to Lens)
—	DF	FRA	Jean-Luc Vasseur (to Rennes)
—	MF	FRA	Bernard Pardo (Free agent)

No.	Pos.	Nation	Player
—	MF	SEN	Oumar Sène (Retired)
—	FW	CMR	Patrick M'Boma (loaned to Châteauroux)
—	FW	FRA	Pascal Nouma (loaned to Lille)
—	FW	FRA	Christian Perez (to Monaco)
—	FW	FRA	David Rinçon (to Châteauroux)
—	FW	ALG	Liazid Sandjak (to Nice)

== Kits ==
Commodore and Tourtel were the shirt sponsors, and Nike was the kit supplier.

Home	Away

== Competitions ==
=== Overview ===
Competition	First match	Last match	Starting round	Final position	Record							
Competition	First match	Last match	Starting round	Final position	Pld	W	D	L	GF	GA	GD	Win %
Division 1	8 August 1992	2 June 1993	Matchday 1	2nd	38	20	11	7	61	29	+32	52.63
Coupe de France	7 March 1993	12 June 1993	Round of 64	Winners	6	6	0	0	9	0	+9	100.00
UEFA Cup	16 September 1992	22 April 1993	First round	Semi-finals	10	4	3	3	14	8	+6	40.00
Total					54	30	14	10	84	37	+47	55.56

Source: Competitions

=== Division 1 ===
==== League table ====
Pos	Team	Pld	W	D	L	GF	GA	GD	Pts	Qualification or relegation
1	Marseille (D)	38	22	10	6	71	36	+35	53 (Note: Marseille and Valenciennes were deducted one point for their involvement in the French football bribery scandal.)	Disqualified from the Champions League (Note: Marseille were stripped of the title and barred from 1993–94 UEFA Champions League due to their involvement in the bribery scandal. Retained league status.)
2	Paris Saint-Germain (N)	38	20	11	7	61	29	+32	51	Qualification to the Cup Winners' Cup first round (Note: Paris Saint-Germain qualified for the 1993–94 European Cup Winners' Cup as winners of the 1992–93 Coupe de France.)
3	Monaco	38	21	9	8	56	29	+27	51	Qualification to the Champions League first round (Note: Monaco qualified for the Champions League as league champions Marseille were disqualified and runners-up Paris Saint-Germain declined to participate.)
4	Bordeaux	38	18	12	8	42	25	+17	48	Qualification to the UEFA Cup first round
5	Nantes	38	17	11	10	54	39	+15	45	Qualification to the UEFA Cup first round

Source: Histoire du PSG
Rules for classification: 1) points; 2) goal difference; 3) number of goals scored.
Victory: 2 points, Draw: 1 point, Defeat: 0 points
(D) Disqualified; (N) Refused title and entry to the UCL

==== Results by round ====
Round	1	2	3	4	5	6	7	8	9	10	11	12	13	14	15	16	17	18	19	20	21	22	23	24	25	26	27	28	29	30	31	32	33	34	35	36	37	38
Ground	A	H	A	H	A	H	A	A	H	A	H	A	H	A	H	A	H	A	H	A	H	A	H	A	H	H	A	H	A	H	A	H	A	H	A	H	A	H
Result	W	W	W	W	D	W	D	D	W	D	D	W	W	D	W	L	W	L	L	W	D	W	W	D	W	D	L	D	L	W	W	W	W	W	D	W	L	W
Position	6	3	1	1	1	1	1	1	1	1	2	2	2	2	2	2	1	3	5	4	3	3	2	3	3	2	3	3	4	4	4	3	3	2	2	2	2	2

A = Away; H = Home; W = Win; D = Draw; L = Loss

==== Matches ====
8 August 1992 1	Saint-Étienne	1–2	Paris Saint-Germain	Saint-Étienne
	Moravčík 60'	Report	Ginola 27'; Sassus 40'	Stadium: Stade Geoffroy-Guichard; Attendance: 25,187; Referee: Georges Ramos

15 August 1992 2	Paris Saint-Germain	2–0	Sochaux	Paris
	Roche 76'; Valdo 80'	Report 1 Report 2		Stadium: Parc des Princes; Attendance: 22,000; Referee: Rémy Harrel

22 August 1992 3	Strasbourg	0–4	Paris Saint-Germain	Strasbourg
		Report	Fournier 9'; Weah 60', 63'; Calderaro 84'	Stadium: Stade de la Meinau; Attendance: 34,292; Referee: Marc Batta

29 August 1992 4	Paris Saint-Germain	2–0	Caen	Paris
	Ginola 28'; Fournier 68'	Report		Stadium: Parc des Princes; Attendance: 31,000; Referee: Gilles Veissière

1 September 1992 5	Lille	0–0	Paris Saint-Germain	Lille
				Stadium: Stade Grimonprez-Jooris; Attendance: 11,000; Referee: Bernard Saules

12 September 1992 6	Paris Saint-Germain	2–0	Valenciennes	Paris
	Weah 47'; Calderaro 81'	Report		Stadium: Parc des Princes; Attendance: 27,050; Referee: Germain Zagni

19 September 1992 7	Montpellier	0–0	Paris Saint-Germain	Montpellier
		Report		Stadium: Stade de la Mosson; Attendance: 17,061; Referee: Alain Sars

25 September 1992 8	Toulouse	2–2	Paris Saint-Germain	Toulouse
	Hernandez 35'; Debève 50'		Weah 80'; Ricardo 84'	Stadium: Stadium de Toulouse; Attendance: 11,769; Referee: Philippe Leduc

4 October 1992 9	Paris Saint-Germain	5–1	Metz	Paris
	Weah 28', 81' (pen.); Ginola 39'; Calderaro 78'; Bravo 86'	Report	Chaouch 68' (pen.)	Stadium: Parc des Princes; Attendance: 22,000; Referee: Jean-Marie Lartigot

7 October 1992 10	Lyon	1–1	Paris Saint-Germain	Lyon
	Garde 7'	Report	Valdo 50'	Stadium: Stade de Gerland; Attendance: 26,227; Referee: Marcel Lainé

17 October 1992 11	Paris Saint-Germain	1–1	Lens	Paris
	Calderaro 77'	Report	Omam-Biyik 72'	Stadium: Parc des Princes; Attendance: 26,000; Referee: Antoine de Pandis

24 October 1992 12	Toulon	0–2	Paris Saint-Germain	Toulon
			Weah 35', 58'	Stadium: Stade de Bon Rencontre; Attendance: 7,000; Referee: Alain Delmer

30 October 1992 13	Paris Saint-Germain	2–3	Nîmes	Paris
	Valdo 11'; Ginola 63'		Vercruysse 13', 80'; Monczuk 20'	Stadium: Parc des Princes; Attendance: 22,000; Referee: Alain Lalu

7 November 1992 14	Le Havre	1–1	Paris Saint-Germain	Le Havre
	Guruli 28'	Report	Weah 41' (pen.)	Stadium: Stade Jules Deschaseaux; Attendance: 10,308; Referee: Georges Ramos

19 November 1992 15	Paris Saint-Germain	2–0	Auxerre	Paris
	Weah 62'; Guérin 63'	Report		Stadium: Parc des Princes; Attendance: 25,288; Referee: Gilles Veissière

28 November 1992 16	Monaco	3–1	Paris Saint-Germain	Monaco
	Klinsmann 21'; Luís Henrique 30'; Djorkaeff 87'	Report	Dumas 20' (o.g.)	Stadium: Stade Louis II; Attendance: 13,500; Referee: Alain Sars

4 December 1992 17	Paris Saint-Germain	5–0	Bordeaux	Paris
	Le Guen 4'; Bravo 27'; Germain 49'; Roche 57'; Simba 73'	Report		Stadium: Parc des Princes; Attendance: 30,000; Referee: Claude Colombo

12 December 1992 18	Nantes	1–0	Paris Saint-Germain	Nantes
	Ouédec 31'	Report		Stadium: Stade de la Beaujoire; Attendance: 34,335; Referee: Marc Batta

18 December 1992 19	Paris Saint-Germain	0–1	Marseille	Paris
		Report 1 Report 2	Bokšić 21'	Stadium: Parc des Princes; Attendance: 42,509; Referee: Michel Girard

9 January 1993 20	Sochaux	1–3	Paris Saint-Germain	Montbéliard
	Clément 83'	Report	Weah 52'; Fournier 71'; Ginola 79'	Stadium: Stade Auguste-Bonal; Attendance: 6,239; Referee: Philippe Leduc

16 January 1993 21	Paris Saint-Germain	1–1	Strasbourg	Paris
	Roche 86'	Report 1 Report 2	Farina 66'	Stadium: Parc des Princes; Attendance: 26,193; Referee: Rémy Harrel

22 January 1993 22	Caen	0–2	Paris Saint-Germain	Caen
		Report	Weah 56'; Sassus 86'	Stadium: Stade de Venoix; Attendance: 7,867; Referee: Didier Pauchard

30 January 1993 23	Paris Saint-Germain	3–0	Lille	Paris
	Weah 15'; Fournier 55'; Simba 74'	Report		Stadium: Parc des Princes; Attendance: 23,863; Referee: Patrick Anton

6 February 1993 24	Valenciennes	1–1	Paris Saint-Germain	Valenciennes
	Burruchaga 36' (pen.)	Report	Weah 45'	Stadium: Stade Nungesser; Attendance: 14,683; Referee: Bernard Saules

10 February 1993 25	Paris Saint-Germain	1–0	Montpellier	Paris
	Ginola 70'	Report		Stadium: Parc des Princes; Attendance: 24,076; Referee: Georges Ramos

21 February 1993 26	Paris Saint-Germain	0–0	Toulouse	Paris
		Report 2		Stadium: Parc des Princes; Attendance: 23,249; Referee: Antoine de Pandis

26 February 1993 27	Metz	2–1	Paris Saint-Germain	Metz
	Kubík 15' (pen.), 78' (pen.)	Report	Ricardo 88'	Stadium: Stade Saint-Symphorien; Attendance: 11,897; Referee: Marcel Lainé

12 March 1993 28	Paris Saint-Germain	1–1	Lyon	Paris
	Ricardo 7' (pen.)	Report	Garde 66' (pen.)	Stadium: Parc des Princes; Attendance: 25,000; Referee: Jean-Marie Lartigot

21 March 1993 29	Lens	2–1	Paris Saint-Germain	Lens
	Omam-Biyik 55'; Héréson 72'	Report	Ricardo 29' (pen.)	Stadium: Stade Bollaert-Delelis; Attendance: 17,685; Referee: Alain Sars

2 April 1993 30	Paris Saint-Germain	2–0	Toulon	Paris
	Simba 10', 90'	Report		Stadium: Parc des Princes; Attendance: 27,000; Referee: Serge Léon

10 April 1993 31	Nîmes	0–1	Paris Saint-Germain	Nîmes
		Report	Bravo 44'	Stadium: Stade des Costières; Attendance: 8,702; Referee: Rémy Harrel

14 April 1993 32	Paris Saint-Germain	1–0	Le Havre	Paris
	Ricardo 35'	Report		Stadium: Parc des Princes; Attendance: 18,500; Referee: Germain Zagni

1 May 1993 33	Auxerre	1–2	Paris Saint-Germain	Auxerre
	Cocard 53'		Guérin 48'; Reynaud 78'	Stadium: Stade de l'Abbé-Deschamps; Attendance: 17,000; Referee: Philippe Leduc

8 May 1993 34	Paris Saint-Germain	1–0	Monaco	Paris
	Fournier 81'	Report 1 Report 2		Stadium: Parc des Princes; Attendance: 37,000; Referee: Jean-Marie Lartigot

14 May 1993 35	Bordeaux	1–1	Paris Saint-Germain	Bordeaux
	Dugarry 44'	Report 1 Report 2	Roche 23'	Stadium: Stade Chaban-Delmas; Attendance: 30,755; Referee: Gilles Veissière

22 May 1993 36	Paris Saint-Germain	1–0	Nantes	Paris
	Calderaro 89'	Report		Stadium: Parc des Princes; Attendance: 34,878; Referee: Philippe Leduc

29 May 1993 37	Marseille	3–1	Paris Saint-Germain	Marseille
	Völler 16'; Boli 38'; Bokšić 76'	Report 1 Report 2	Guérin 7'	Stadium: Stade Vélodrome; Attendance: 37,178; Referee: Didier Pauchard

2 June 1993 38	Paris Saint-Germain	3–1	Saint-Étienne	Paris
	Fournier 26'; Guérin 43'; Calderaro 89'	Report	Kastendeuch 57' (pen.)	Stadium: Parc des Princes; Attendance: 28,000; Referee: Antoine de Pandis

=== Coupe de France ===
7 March 1993 Round of 64	Strasbourg	0–1 (a.e.t.)	Paris Saint-Germain	Strasbourg
		Report	Weah 118'	Stadium: Stade de la Meinau; Attendance: 10,460; Referee: Philippe Leduc

30 March 1993 Round of 32	Annecy	0–1	Paris Saint-Germain	Annecy
		Report	Ginola 72'	Stadium: Parc des Sports; Attendance: 2,980; Referee: Jean-Louis Rideau

4 May 1993 Round of 16	Monaco	0–1	Paris Saint-Germain	Monaco
		Report	Kombouaré 86'	Stadium: Stade Louis II; Attendance: 8,000; Referee: Bernard Saules

18 May 1993 Quarter-finals	Paris Saint-Germain	2–0	Bordeaux	Paris
	Fournier 14'; Weah 41'	Report		Stadium: Parc des Princes; Attendance: 20,000; Referee: Alain Sars

6 June 1993 Semi-finals	Paris Saint-Germain	1–0	Laval	Paris
	Guérin 60'	Report		Stadium: Parc des Princes; Attendance: 8,000; Referee: Michel Girard

12 June 1993 Final	Paris Saint-Germain	3–0	Nantes	Paris
	Kombouaré 50' (pen.); Ginola 55'; Roche 59'	Report		Stadium: Parc des Princes; Attendance: 48,789; Referee: Rémy Harrel

=== UEFA Cup ===
==== First round ====
16 September 1992 First leg	Paris Saint-Germain (France)	2–0	(Greece) PAOK	Paris, France
	Weah 13', 24'	Report		Stadium: Parc des Princes; Attendance: 20,000; Referee: Brian McGinlay (Scotland)

1 October 1992 Second leg	PAOK (Greece)	0–3 (0–5 agg.)	(France) Paris Saint-Germain	Thessaloniki, Greece
		Report		Stadium: Toumba Stadium; Attendance: 30,000; Referee: John Blankenstein (Netherlands)
Note: Match abandoned at half-time due to the unruly behaviour of the PAOK supporters. Paris Saint-Germain were leading 0–2 with goals from George Weah and Jean-Luc Sassus. UEFA voided the original result and awarded a 0–3 victory to Paris Saint-Germain.

==== Second round ====
21 October 1992 First leg	Napoli (Italy)	0–2	(France) Paris Saint-Germain	Naples, Italy
		Report	Weah 16', 35'	Stadium: Stadio Diego Armando Maradona; Attendance: 35,378; Referee: Karl-Josef Assenmacher (Germany)

4 November 1992 Second leg	Paris Saint-Germain (France)	0–0 (2–0 agg.)	(Italy) Napoli	Paris, France
		Report		Stadium: Parc des Princes; Attendance: 43,605; Referee: Joe Worrall (England)

==== Third round ====
24 November 1992 First leg	Paris Saint-Germain (France)	0–0	(Belgium) Anderlecht	Paris, France
		Report		Stadium: Parc des Princes; Attendance: 32,402; Referee: Angelo Amendolia (Italy)

8 December 1992 Second leg	Anderlecht (Belgium)	1–1 (1–1 (a) agg.)	(France) Paris Saint-Germain	Anderlecht, Belgium
	Bosman 53'	Report	Kombouaré 76'	Stadium: Constant Vanden Stock Stadium; Attendance: 25,000; Referee: Kurt Röthlisberger (Switzerland)

==== Quarter-finals ====
2 March 1993 First leg	Real Madrid (Spain)	3–1	(France) Paris Saint-Germain	Madrid, Spain
	Butragueño 31'; Zamorano 34'; Míchel 89'		Ginola 49'	Stadium: Santiago Bernabéu Stadium; Attendance: 50,000; Referee: David Elleray (England)

18 March 1993 Second leg	Paris Saint-Germain (France)	4–1 (5–4 agg.)	(Spain) Real Madrid	Paris, France
	Weah 34'; Ginola 81'; Valdo 89'; Kombouaré 90+6'		Zamorano 90+4'	Stadium: Parc des Princes; Attendance: 46,000; Referee: Sándor Puhl (Hungary)

==== Semi-finals ====
6 April 1993 First leg	Juventus (Italy)	2–1	(France) Paris Saint-Germain	Turin, Italy
	Baggio 55', 90+2'		Weah 23'	Stadium: Stadio delle Alpi; Attendance: 42,793; Referee: Antonio Martin Navarrete (Spain)

22 April 1993 Second leg	Paris Saint-Germain (France)	0–1 (1–3 agg.)	(Italy) Juventus	Paris, France
		Report	Baggio 77'	Stadium: Parc des Princes; Attendance: 48,000; Referee: Jaap Uilenberg (Netherlands)

== Statistics ==
As of the 1992–93 season.

=== Appearances and goals ===
No.	Pos	Nat	Player	Total		Division 1		Coupe de France		UEFA Cup	
No.	Pos	Nat	Player	Apps	Goals	Apps	Goals	Apps	Goals	Apps	Goals
Goalkeepers
	GK	(France) FRA	Bernard Lama	54	0	38	0	6	0	10	0
Defenders
	DF	(France) FRA	Patrick Colleter	52	0	36	0	6	0	10	0
	DF	(Brazil) BRA	Ricardo	51	5	36	5	5	0	10	0
	DF	(France) FRA	Alain Roche	47	5	34	4	5	1	8	0
	DF	(France) FRA	Jean-Luc Sassus	37	3	28	2	2	0	7	1
	DF	(France) FRA	Antoine Kombouaré	29	4	19	0	5	2	5	2
	DF	(France) FRA	Bruno Germain	14	1	9	1	2	0	3	0
	DF	(France) FRA	Francis Llacer	12	0	9	0	1	0	2	0
Midfielders
	MF	(France) FRA	Paul Le Guen	54	1	38	1	6	0	10	0
	MF	(France) FRA	Laurent Fournier	48	7	33	6	6	1	9	0
	MF	(France) FRA	Vincent Guérin	47	5	31	4	6	1	10	0
	MF	(France) FRA	Daniel Bravo	42	3	30	3	6	0	6	0
	MF	(Brazil) BRA	Valdo	40	4	28	3	3	0	9	1
	MF	(France) FRA	Pierre Reynaud	11	1	9	1	2	0	0	0
Forwards
	FW	(France) FRA	David Ginola	49	10	34	6	6	2	9	2
	FW	(Liberia) LBR	George Weah	45	23	30	14	6	2	9	7
	FW	(France) FRA	François Calderaro	29	6	23	6	2	0	4	0
	FW	(France) FRA	Amara Simba	18	4	13	4	3	0	2	0
	FW	(France) FRA	Joël Cloarec	1	0	1	0	0	0	0	0

Source: Competitions
