= 1993 Coupe de France final =

- Event: 1992–93 Coupe de France
Paris Saint-Germain	Nantes
3	0
- Date: 13 June 1993
- Venue: Parc des Princes, Paris
- Referee: Rémi Harrel
- Attendance: 48,789

The 1993 Coupe de France final was a football match held at Parc des Princes, Paris on 13 June 1993 that saw Paris SG defeat FC Nantes Atlantique 3-0 thanks to goals by Antoine Kombouaré, David Ginola and Alain Roche. FC Nantes finished the match with 8 players following three red cards.

== Road to the final ==
Paris Saint-Germain			Round	Nantes
Opponent	H/A	Result	1992–93 Coupe de France	Opponent	H/A	Result
Strasbourg	A	1–0 (a.e.t.)	Round of 64	Bourg-Perronas	A	4–2 (a.e.t.)
Annecy	A	1–0	Round of 32	Rodez	H	9–1
Monaco	A	1–0	Round of 16	Gazélec Ajaccio	H	1–0
Bordeaux	H	2–0	Quarter-finals	Montpellier	A	0–0 (a.e.t.); 5−4 pen.
Laval	H	1–0	Semi-finals	Saint-Étienne	A	1–0

== Match details ==
13 June 1993
20:00

Paris Saint-Germain	3–0	Nantes
Kombouaré 50' (pen.); Ginola 55'; Roche 60'

Parc des Princes, Paris
Attendance: 48,789
Referee: Rémi Harrel

PARIS SG:
GK	1	(France) Bernard Lama
DF	6	(France) Antoine Kombouaré
DF	4	(Brazil) Ricardo Gomes
DF	5	(France) Alain Roche
DF	3	(France) Patrick Colleter	(yellow card) 33'
MF	13	(France) Laurent Fournier
MF	7	(France) Daniel Bravo		(substituted off) 66'
MF	15	(France) Paul Le Guen (c)
MF	8	(France) Vincent Guérin	(yellow card) 80'	(substituted off) 81'
FW	9	(Liberia) George Weah
FW	11	(France) David Ginola
Substitutes:
GK	12	(France) Richard Dutruel
MF	10	(Brazil) Valdo		(substituted on) 66'
FW	14	(France) François Calderaro		(substituted on) 81'
Manager:
(Portugal) Artur Jorge Assistant Referees: Fourth Official:

FC NANTES ATLANTIQUE:
GK	1	(France) David Marraud (c)
DF	6	(France) Serge Le Dizet
DF	3	(France) Laurent Guyot
DF	4	(Croatia) Zoran Vulić	(yellow card) 58' (yellow-red card) 68'
DF	2	(France) Christian Karembeu	(yellow card) 36' (yellow-red card) 46'
MF	7	(France) Claude Makélélé
MF	5	(France) Jean-Michel Ferri	(yellow card) 56'
MF	8	(France) Reynald Pedros
MF	10	(France) Stéphane Ziani		(substituted off) 63'
FW	9	(France) Patrice Loko		(substituted off) 71'
FW	11	(France) Nicolas Ouédec
Substitutes:
DF	13	(France) Stéphane Moreau		(substituted on) 63'
MF	14	(France) Jean-Louis Lima	(red card) 83'	(substituted on) 71'
Manager:
(France) Jean-Claude Suaudeau

== See also ==
- 1992–93 Coupe de France
