= Jean-Claude Fernandes =

French football manager and executive (born 1972)

Personal information
- Date of birth: 8 November 1972 (age 53)
- Place of birth: Longjumeau, France}
- Height: 1.74 m (5 ft 9 in)
- Position: Midfielder

Team information
- Current team: Sainte-Geneviève (sporting director)

Youth career
- 1984–1985: Saint-Michel FC 91
- 1985–1987: Morangis-Chilly
- 1987–1993: Paris Saint-Germain

Senior career*
Years	Team	Apps	(Gls)
1993–1996	Paris Saint-Germain	1	(0)
1994–1996	→ Nancy (loan)	44	(3)
1996–1998	Châteauroux	22	(1)
1998–2004	Sainte-Geneviève		

International career
1990–1991	France U19	3	(1)

Managerial career
- 2002–2007: Sainte-Geneviève
- * Club domestic league appearances and goals

Jean-Claude Fernandes (born 8 November 1972) is a French professional football manager, executive, and former player.

== Playing career ==
=== Paris Saint-Germain ===
At the age of 14, Fernandes joined Paris Saint-Germain (PSG). He turned down moves to Saint-Étienne, Auxerre, Lille, Nantes, and RC Paris in order to stay closer to his parents, and because he was a supporter of PSG.

On 11 August 1993, Fernandes made his first and only appearance for PSG in a 1–0 win against Sochaux. PSG won the Division 1 in 1993–94, therefore Fernandes had the title attributed to him in his career honours, despite not playing a full match the entire season.

During the 1995–96 season, Fernandes went on loan to Nancy in the Division 2. He played frequently in his first season under manager László Bölöni, and stayed at the club the following year. In the beginning of the 1995–96 season, Fernandes injured his knee. He was back at playing football after four months on the sidelines, but only made a total of 13 appearances that campaign before leaving the club.

=== Châteauroux ===
After leaving Nancy, Fernandes went back to Paris Saint-Germain, only to sign for Châteauroux one weekend before the closing of the transfer market. In his first season with the club, he played a total of 24 matches across all competitions as Châteauroux won the Division 2.

Châteauroux played in the Division 1 in the 1997–98 season, but were relegated. Fernandes did not play a single match due to injury; he had surgery three times on his knee. After failed transfers to Sedan and Pisa due to injury, Fernandes decided to end his professional career.

=== Sainte-Geneviève ===
In December 1998, Fernandes joined amateur club Sainte-Geneviève, where his brother was playing. He became player-manager for the club in June 2002, and retired from football two years later.

== Post-playing career ==
In 2004, Fernandes stopped playing football altogether. He took the full job of manager at Sainte-Geneviève after being player-manager for the previous two seasons. In 2007, Fernandes left his position as head coach to become the coordinator of the club. Fernandes stayed in this role for a year before becoming sporting director of Sainte-Geneviève Sports in 2008. He works with former Paris Saint-Germain teammate Emmanuel Dorado, who is the manager at the club.

Back in 2007, while being the coordinator of Sainte-Geneviève Sports, Fernandes worked in parallel for the city of Sainte-Geneviève-des-Bois. He was responsible for services of transport, and had twenty persons working under his responsibility.

== Career statistics ==
Appearances and goals by club, season and competition
Club	Season	League			Cup		Total	
Club	Season	Division	Apps	Goals	Apps	Goals	Apps	Goals
Paris Saint-Germain	1993–94	Division 1	1	0	0	0	1	0
Nancy (loan)	1994–95	Division 2	31	2	3	0	34	2
Nancy (loan)	1995–96	Division 2	13	1	0	0	13	1
Nancy (loan)	Total		44	3	3	0	47	3
Châteauroux	1996–97	Division 2	22	1	2	0	24	1
Châteauroux	1997–98	Division 1	0	0	0	0	0	0
Châteauroux	Total		22	1	2	0	24	1
Career total			67	4	5	0	72	4

== Honours ==
Paris Saint-Germain U19

- Coupe Gambardella: 1990–91

Paris Saint-Germain

- Division 1: 1993–94

Châteauroux

- Division 2: 1996–97
