= David Ginola =

French footballer (born 1967)

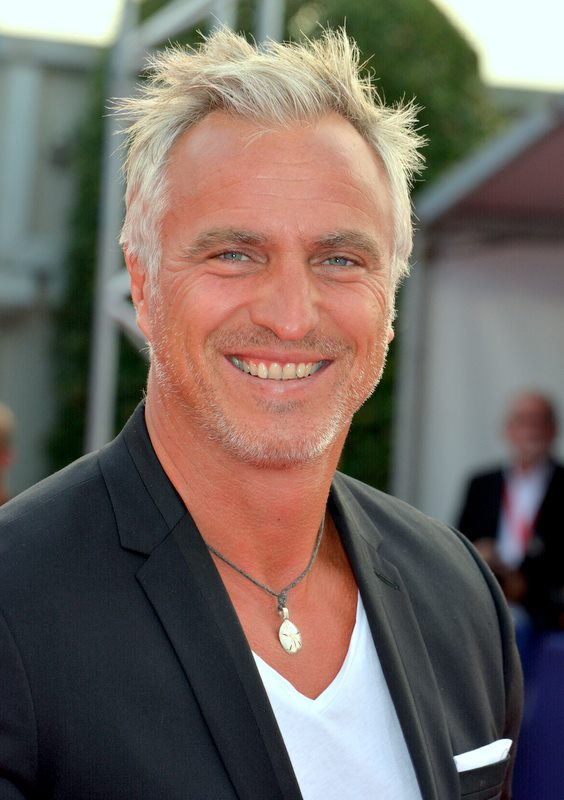
- Ginola in 2014

Personal information
- Full name: David Ginola-Ceze
- Date of birth: 25 January 1967 (age 59)
- Place of birth: Gassin, Var, France
- Height: 1.86 m (6 ft 1 in)
- Position: Winger

Senior career*
| Years | Team | Apps | (Gls) |
| 1985–1988 | Toulon | 82 | (4) |
| 1988–1990 | Racing Paris | 61 | (8) |
| 1990–1992 | Brest | 50 | (14) |
| 1992–1995 | Paris Saint-Germain | 115 | (33) |
| 1995–1997 | Newcastle United | 58 | (6) |
| 1997–2000 | Tottenham Hotspur | 100 | (13) |
| 2000–2002 | Aston Villa | 32 | (3) |
| 2002 | Everton | 5 | (0) |
| Total | | 503 | (81) |

International career
| 1990–1995 | France | 17 | (3) |
- * Club domestic league appearances and goals

David Ginola-Ceze (born 25 January 1967) is a French former professional footballer. A television personality, he has also worked as an actor, model and football pundit.

A forward, Ginola played for ten seasons in France with Toulon, Racing Paris, Brest and Paris Saint-Germain before moving to Newcastle United in the English Premier League in July 1995. He subsequently played for Tottenham Hotspur, Aston Villa and Everton before retiring in 2002. At international level, he made 17 appearances, scoring three goals, for the France national team between 1990 and 1995.

Since his retirement from football, he has become involved in football punditry and acting. Ginola is a regular contributor to BBC, BT Sport and CNN. He has hosted Match of ze Day, a program which broadcasts live Premier League matches on Canal+. In January 2015, Ginola attempted to run for the FIFA presidency but withdrew after failing to receive the required backing of at least five national football associations.

== Early life ==
David Ginola-Ceze was born on 25 January 1967 in Gassin, Var.

== Club career ==
Ginola made his first senior appearance for Sporting Toulon as an eighteen-year-old in a 1985 2–0 victory away at Metz. He played fourteen times in his first season, and by 1986 he was a regular in the Toulon line-up. In 1988, he moved to Racing Paris, where he remained until signing for Brest in 1990. There, he began to impress with his flamboyant style of play. In 1991, he played a crucial role in a landmark victory (3–2) against the side who would go on to sign him, Paris Saint-Germain.

=== Paris Saint-Germain ===
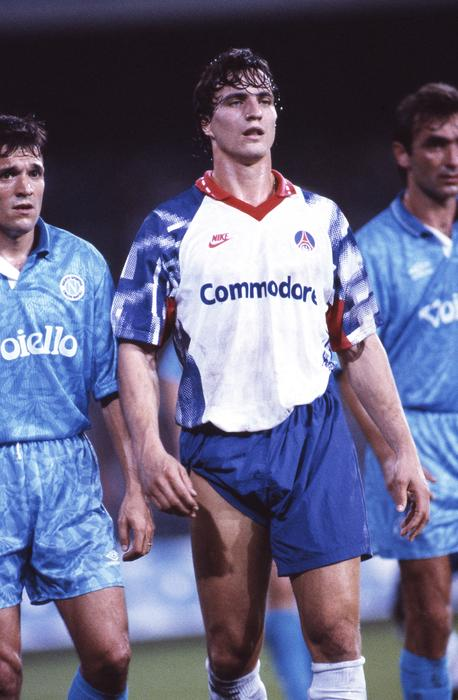
Ginola with PSG in 1992.

Ginola joined Paris Saint-Germain in January 1992, at a time when it was pushing for major honours with the financial backing of TV channel Canal+. He quickly adapted to the club and became a fan favourite noted for his elegant first touch and pace. His popularity did not suffer any consequence even when he admitted that he supported Paris Saint-Germain's rivals Marseille as a boy and that he would have joined them rather than PSG. In his first full season (1992–93), Ginola won the Coupe de France (scoring in the final) and reached the semi-finals of the UEFA Cup. At the end of 1993, he was also won the French Footballer of the Year award from France Football.

In his second full season in 1993–94, PSG won the second league title of its history, losing only three times. Alongside Paul Le Guen, Bernard Lama and Antoine Kombouaré and coached by Artur Jorge, Ginola provided 13 goals in 38 games, which made him the top club goalscorer.

The following season, under new manager Luis Fernandez, proved to be less successful in the league, with Nantes being crowned champions. Ginola scored 11 times in 28 league appearances. Paris Saint-Germain did shine in the cup competitions though, winning another Coupe de France as well as the first edition of the new Coupe de la Ligue. In the UEFA Champions League, the Parisian club caused a major shock after knocking out 1994's finalists Barcelona in the quarter-finals, with Ginola playing particularly well. The club was eliminated at the next hurdle by defending champions AC Milan.

In the summer of 1995, Ginola decided to leave France. Known to be a Spanish football enthusiast, he was expected to be snapped up by Barcelona. Furthermore, between 1992 and 1995, his stellar displays in European competitions against the Spanish giants Real Madrid and Barcelona had attracted media attention in Spain, with local media dubbing him "El Magnifico". However, a proposed transfer to Barcelona broke down, Ginola being told this was down to the Catalan club's inability to move on other foreign-registered players.

=== Newcastle United ===
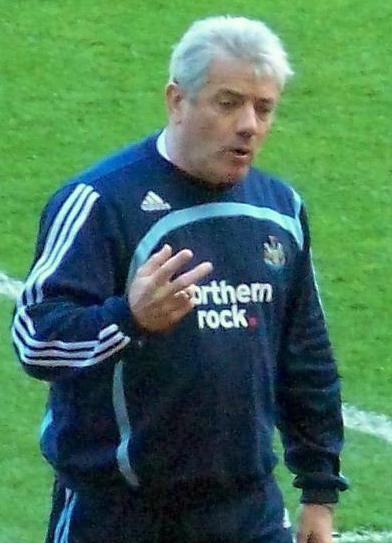
Ginola played under Kevin Keegan at Newcastle and was twice a Premier League runner-up during Keegan's spell as manager.

In 1995, Ginola joined Premier League club Newcastle United for £2.5 million. He was signed at a time when manager Kevin Keegan was attempting to turn the club into one of the major forces in English football, and the board was prepared to offer strong financial backing to sign a number of European superstars. Ginola made his debut against Coventry City on 19 August 1995 in a 3–0 win. He scored his first league goal on 27 August against Sheffield Wednesday in a 2–0 away win, and went on to score five league goals in his first season, including Newcastle's second in their 4–3 defeat to Liverpool at Anfield – the latter considered one of the greatest games in Premier League history. In the 1995–96, Newcastle finished second, four points behind Manchester United. This was their strongest league performance in decades, and Ginola was an integral part of the team. However, it was a major disappointment that Newcastle had finished second in the Premier League as they had led by up to 12 points as late as January.

In 1996, Barcelona's English manager Bobby Robson attempted personally to sign Ginola, but Newcastle refused to allow the transfer. To add to their line-up, Newcastle paid £15m, breaking the transfer record, to sign Alan Shearer. Despite this, they finished second again behind Manchester United. Halfway through the season, Kevin Keegan suddenly resigned as manager to be succeeded by Kenny Dalglish. Ginola fell out of favour and sought a transfer elsewhere.

=== Tottenham Hotspur ===
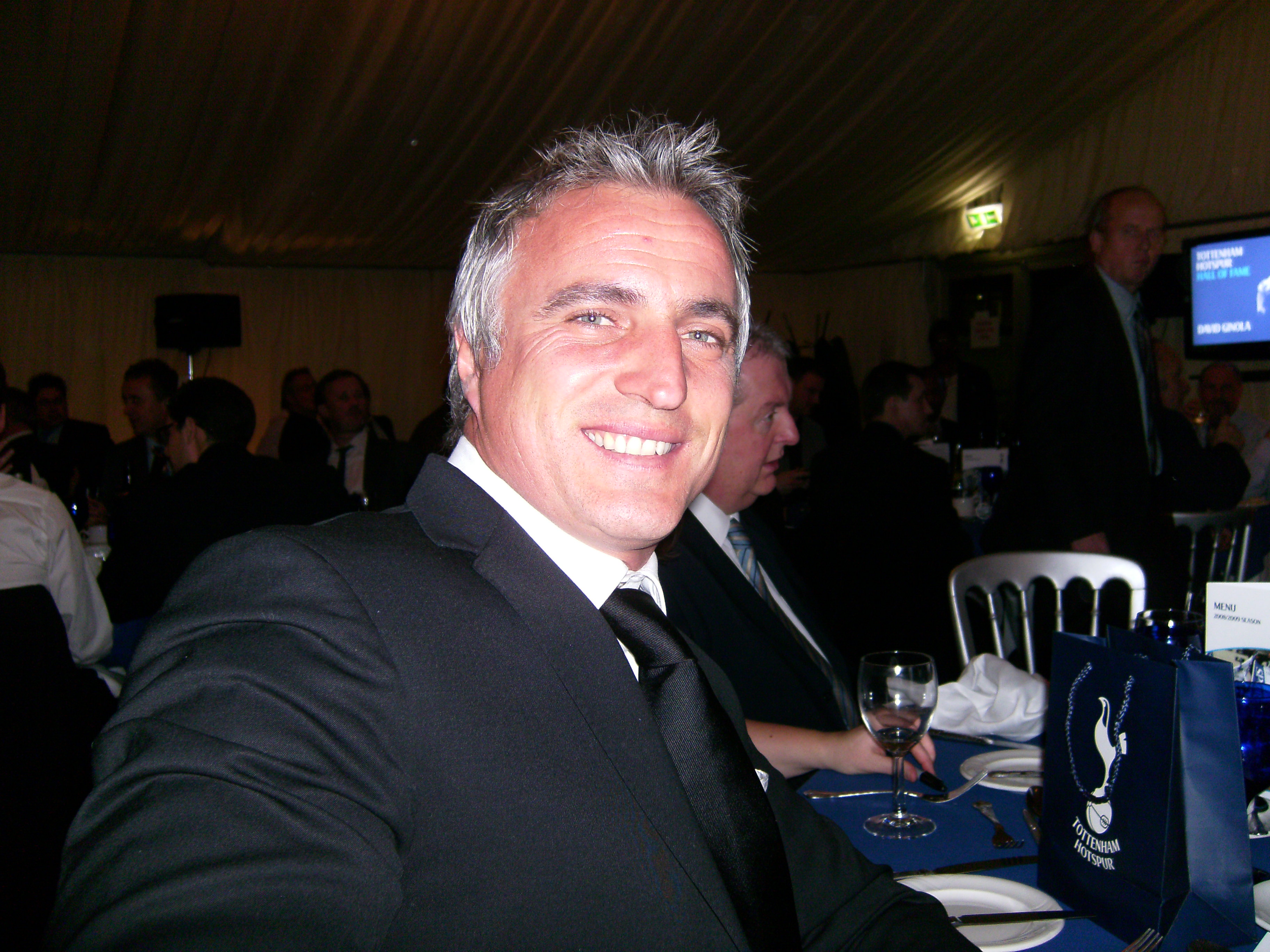
Ginola at his Tottenham Hotspur Hall of Fame induction in 2008.

Tottenham Hotspur signed Ginola in July 1997 for £2.5 million, where he was joined by Newcastle teammate Les Ferdinand. During the 1998–99 season, Ginola scored one of his most notable goals, when Spurs played Barnsley in the FA Cup sixth round; Ginola weaved past several Barnsley players and finished calmly in the left side of the net for the only goal of the game. In 1999, he was named PFA Players' Player of the Year and FWA Footballer of the Year, becoming the first player in Premiership history to win the award while at a club who finished the season outside of the top four. He also won his only English domestic trophy with Spurs, the 1999 League Cup with a 1–0 victory over Leicester City at Wembley . Ginola is fondly remembered by Tottenham fans for his extravagant forward play and personality off the pitch. He was inducted into the club's Hall of Fame on 11 December 2008.

=== Aston Villa ===
In July 2000, Ginola joined Aston Villa for a transfer fee of £3 million. He expressed his disappointment that Tottenham had sold him, saying the news that they had accepted the offer was a "bombshell". Villa manager John Gregory challenged Ginola to prove he could still perform in the Premiership, rather than move to a less demanding league abroad, as Ginola was now in his 33rd year and seemed unlikely to continue at professional level for much longer. After being accused by Gregory of being overweight, Ginola celebrated a goal against Manchester City by taking off his jersey to unveil his toned physique.

In January 2002, he was banned for two matches and fined £22,000 for stamping on an opponent and disputing his dismissal with the fourth official.

=== Everton ===
In February 2002, Ginola signed for Everton, playing five games for the club before retiring in May 2002, just after David Moyes took over as manager: Ginola was deemed surplus to requirements by Moyes, and made only one substitute appearance from March onwards. His contract was not renewed and, without a club, decided to retire. He announced his intention to move into either acting or football coaching.

== International career ==
Although Ginola was a very prominent French player, he did not see much action with the France national team, being capped only 17 times in his career. In 1987, Ginola played for the France under-21 team at the Toulon Tournament. He was named the tournament's best player after France beat England 4–3 in the final.

Ginola is infamous in France for his mistake in a 1994 FIFA World Cup qualifying match against Bulgaria. France needed only a draw in their final group qualifying match on 17 November 1993 to qualify for the finals of the 1994 FIFA World Cup and Ginola had come on as a late substitute for Jean-Pierre Papin. With the score level at 1–1 in the last minute of the match, Ginola overhit a cross intended for Eric Cantona. The ball was collected by Emil Kremenliev, who launched a quick Bulgarian counterattack which resulted in Emil Kostadinov scoring the winning goal. Bulgaria thus won the match 2–1 and qualified for the 1994 World Cup finals at the expense of France.

In a television interview aired on 18 November 1993, Gérard Houllier, the manager of the France team during its entire 1994 World Cup qualifying campaign, blamed France's 2–1 defeat by Bulgaria entirely on Ginola and described him as someone who had "sent an Exocet missile through the heart of French football" and as the "assassin of the team". After being barracked by French fans and branded as the "assassin of French football" by the French press, Ginola moved to England, signing for Newcastle United. Houllier's successor Aimé Jacquet regularly selected Ginola for international matches in the UEFA Euro 1996 qualifyings, but he would not be selected for the finals. He was used often only as a substitute. Ginola played his last match for the national team in 1995. In April 2012, a French court dismissed Ginola's lawsuit against Gérard Houllier for alleged defamation. In the book Secrets de coachs (Coaches' Secrets), Houllier was alleged to have made disparaging remarks about Ginola and to have referred to Ginola in offensive terms, blaming him for misplacing the cross that allowed Bulgaria to launch the decisive counterattack and secure the win over France during the final minute of the 1994 World Cup qualifier.

== Style of play ==
As a winger, Ginola was renowned for his flair, "magical" touch on the ball, quick feet, and balance, as well as his ability to get past players from any type of position. His ability to do so was shown in games for both Tottenham and Newcastle, as demonstrated by his goal in Newcastle's 5–0 win over reigning Premier League champions Manchester United, on 20 October 1996. In addition to his technical skills, he also possessed good vision. He became a part of the "Entertainers" Newcastle side of his era, which also featured other acclaimed players including Alan Shearer, Les Ferdinand, Faustino Asprilla, Peter Beardsley, and Keith Gillespie.

In 1999, Dutch legend Johan Cruyff remarked that it was his belief that Ginola was currently the best player in the world. Despite his ability, Ginola was also notorious for his poor work-rate, difficult character, and lack of discipline both on and off the pitch, which led him to be involved in confrontations with other players as well as some of his managers. As such, his compatriot Eric Cantona criticised him for his poor mentality, despite his technical ability. In 2015, The Daily Telegraph placed Ginola at number 15 in their list of "The top 20 overrated football players of all time", describing him as "one of the world's best on his day, but unfortunately his day was very infrequent. Ginola's carefree attitude infuriated most of the managers he worked with, which is partly why he never lasted more than three years at any club. Too often Ginola was a luxury player who struggled for consistency."

== Other pursuits ==
Ginola worked as a football pundit with the BBC, BT Sport, Canal Plus, CNN, Sky Sports and Talksport.

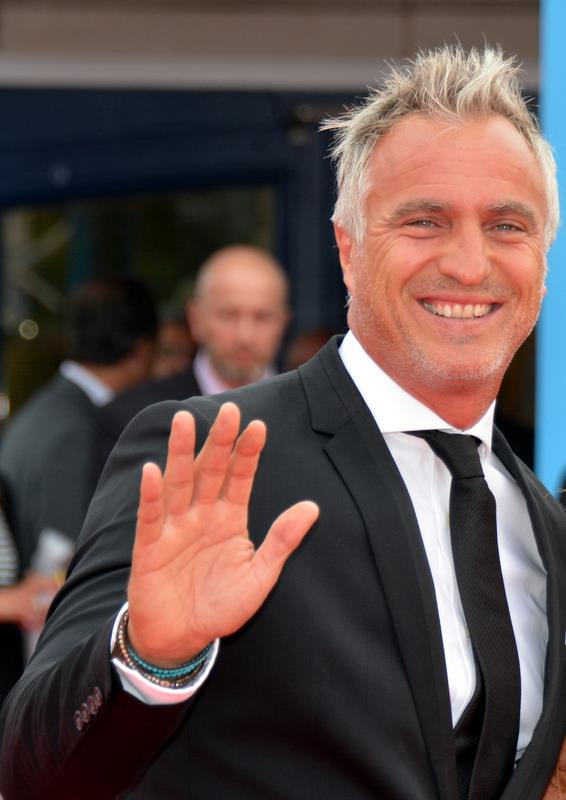
Ginola at the Deauville American Film Festival in 2014.

On 16 January 2015, Ginola announced that he would be running for the presidency of FIFA for which he was paid a £250,000 fee by the Irish bookmaker Paddy Power. He would attempt to raise £2.3 million to fund the campaign for the FIFA presidency through contributions via a crowdfunding program. He started his campaign on the same day by denouncing the credibility of Sepp Blatter’s FIFA before admitting he knew little about the governing body's processes or institutions. The elections to select the next FIFA president would be due on 29 May 2015. Ginola withdrew his candidacy on 29 January, the deadline for candidates to formally submit their nominations, after failing to secure the support of at least five national football associations.

In 2008, Ginola received a silver medal at the International Wine Challenge for a rosé wine produced at his vineyard in Provence.

Ginola was one of the contestants in the first season of Danse avec les stars (a French version of the British TV show Strictly Come Dancing). In 2021, he was announced as a contestant on the twenty-first series of I'm a Celebrity...Get Me Out of Here! in the United Kingdom. He ultimately finished fourth.

=== Acting ===
Ginola took his first steps towards a career in acting by attending classes at RADA.

Ginola made his debut as Didier the Butcher, the leading part in the Anglo-French short film Rosbeef. Rosbeef, a tale of love, lust and a kilo of sausages, premiered during the 2004 Cannes Film Festival. The same year, Rosbeef won a prize, the Prix Coup de Coeur Canal+, at the Festival International de Cinéma et Gastronomie in Dijon. Next, he played the title role, Mr Firecul the devil in the British short film Mr Firecul.

For his first feature film, The Last Drop, Ginola was cast as Corporal Dieter Max, a renegade German sniper alongside the likes of Agathe de la Boulaye, Michael Madsen, Nick Moran, Karel Roden and Billy Zane. This World War II heist movie premiered in Cannes in 2005 and was released as Operation Matchbox.

In 2000, Ginola made a cameo appearance in the first episode of the ITV drama series At Home with the Braithwaites. In 2003, Ginola played himself, announcing the results for the first Euro Lottery. In 2004, he played the leading role in The Centre, a BBC television documentary and, in 2006, he appeared in the second series of Channel 4's Coach Trip during episode 22, in which he acted as a tour guide of Sainte-Maxime. Later that year, Ginola appeared, again as himself, in the ITV series City Lights.

In 2008, Ginola appeared in an episode of Chop Shop on Discovery Turbo, where he had a one-off car designed for his son's birthday; in the same year, he appeared as Alexandre, a fashion photographer, in the special edition of the CBS series The Young and the Restless, shot in Paris to celebrate the 20th anniversary of the show's broadcast in France, where it is known as Les Feux de l'amour.

=== Endorsements ===
Before moving to England, Ginola had already transcended the world of football by featuring in advertising campaigns for the Morgan clothing company and appearing on the catwalk for Cerruti.

In England, he fronted commercials for a.o. Braun shavers, Carte Noire coffee, Kingston Technologies memory sticks, Ladbrokes sports betting, L'Oréal hair products and Renault cars.

Ginola featured in the EA Sports' FIFA video game series; he was on the cover for the International edition of FIFA 97, and was introduced in FIFA 23 as a FUT Hero player. Ginola was an ambassador for the Paris 2012 Olympic bid and was also an ambassador for the French Golf Federation in their successful bid to stage the Ryder Cup 2018 in France. Ginola campaigned worldwide for the English FA bid to host the 2018 FIFA World Cup.

He is a campaigner for the Red Cross Anti-Landmine campaign and UNESCO and was respectively patron and president of the UK based Vision and Sparks charities.

== Personal life ==
Ginola is of Italian descent. He married fashion model Coraline in 1991. The couple have a son and a daughter, Andrea and Carla; they lived near Saint-Tropez. They split and Ginola entered a relationship with model Maeva Denat, with whom he has a child.

In May 2010, David Ginola faced a court summons for "abandoning his family" after Joëlle Pinquier, 41, claimed he was the father of daughter Joy, 17, and had not handed over support payments. Pinquier claimed Ginola had failed to abide by a 2006 court ruling ordering him to pay child maintenance of £400 a month. The French court ordered him to pay the sum after he refused to take a DNA test to ascertain whether he was the father. Criminal proceedings were dropped after he paid the full £30,000 arrears.

On the afternoon of 19 May 2016, Ginola was playing a charity football match at the home of Jean-Stéphane Camerini (the organiser of the Mapauto Golf Cup) in Mandelieu-la-Napoule in the southeast of France when he suddenly collapsed due to cardiac arrest and then fell into a coma. He was administered cardiopulmonary resuscitation (CPR) on the pitch by fellow footballer Frédéric Mendy. Minutes later, a team of medics who had arrived in an ambulance used a defibrillator on him; it took five shocks from the machine to restore normal heart rhythm within 10 minutes. Ginola was airlifted minutes later by a helicopter to the Cardiothoracic Center of Monaco 40 km northeast of Mandelieu, where he underwent an immediate, six-hour, operation. Professor Gilles Dreyfus, who operated on Ginola, said that were it not for Mendy who administered CPR on him he would be dead, or have suffered permanent brain damage. Dreyfus said that Ginola had "very complicated coronary lesions " which required the quadruple heart bypass operation to be performed. The morning after being admitted to the hospital, Ginola woke up "perfectly normally" with no neurological damage and was "recovering well". Dreyfus said that Ginola was "very lucky to be alive". On 30 May 2016, Ginola was discharged from hospital and returned home, thanking people on Twitter for their "incredible messages of love and affection".

== Career statistics ==
=== Club ===
Appearances and goals by club, season and competition
| Club | Season | League | | | National cup (Note: Includes Coupe de France, FA Cup) | | League cup (Note: Includes Coupe de la Ligue, Football League Cup) | | Europe | | Other | | Total | |
| Club | Season | Division | Apps | Goals | Apps | Goals | Apps | Goals | Apps | Goals | Apps | Goals | Apps | Goals |
|---|---|---|---|---|---|---|---|---|---|---|---|---|---|---|
| Toulon | 1985–86 | Division 1 | 14 | 0 | 0 | 0 | – | | – | | – | | 14 | 0 |
| Toulon | 1986–87 | Division 1 | 35 | 0 | 1 | 0 | – | | – | | – | | 36 | 0 |
| Toulon | 1987–88 | Division 1 | 33 | 4 | 3 | 1 | – | | – | | – | | 36 | 5 |
| Toulon | Total | | 82 | 4 | 4 | 1 | – | | – | | – | | 86 | 5 |
| Racing Paris | 1988–89 | Division 1 | 29 | 7 | 2 | 1 | – | | – | | – | | 31 | 8 |
| Racing Paris | 1989–90 | Division 1 | 32 | 1 | 6 | 1 | – | | – | | – | | 38 | 2 |
| Racing Paris | Total | | 61 | 8 | 8 | 2 | – | | – | | – | | 69 | 10 |
| Brest | 1990–91 | Division 1 | 33 | 6 | 3 | 1 | – | | – | | – | | 36 | 7 |
| Brest | 1991–92 | Division 2 | 17 | 8 | 0 | 0 | – | | – | | – | | 17 | 8 |
| Brest | Total | | 50 | 14 | 3 | 1 | – | | – | | – | | 53 | 15 |
| Paris Saint-Germain | 1991–92 | Division 1 | 15 | 3 | 2 | 1 | – | | – | | – | | 17 | 4 |
| Paris Saint-Germain | 1992–93 | Division 1 | 34 | 6 | 6 | 2 | – | | 9 (Note: Appearances in UEFA Cup) | 2 | – | | 49 | 10 |
| Paris Saint-Germain | 1993–94 | Division 1 | 38 | 13 | 3 | 3 | – | | 8 (Note: Appearances in European Cup Winners' Cup) | 2 | – | | 49 | 18 |
| Paris Saint-Germain | 1994–95 | Division 1 | 28 | 11 | 2 | 0 | 3 | 0 | 10 (Note: Appearances in UEFA Champions League) | 1 | – | | 43 | 12 |
| Paris Saint-Germain | Total | | 115 | 33 | 13 | 6 | 3 | 0 | 27 | 5 | – | | 158 | 44 |
| Newcastle United | 1995–96 | Premier League | 34 | 5 | 2 | 0 | 4 | 0 | – | | – | | 40 | 5 |
| Newcastle United | 1996–97 | Premier League | 24 | 1 | 2 | 0 | 2 | 0 | 7 | 1 | 1 (Note: Appearance in FA Charity Shield) | 0 | 36 | 2 |
| Newcastle United | Total | | 58 | 6 | 4 | 0 | 6 | 0 | 7 | 1 | 1 | 0 | 75 | 7 |
| Tottenham Hotspur | 1997–98 | Premier League | 34 | 6 | 3 | 1 | 3 | 2 | – | | – | | 40 | 9 |
| Tottenham Hotspur | 1998–99 | Premier League | 30 | 3 | 6 | 3 | 5 | 1 | – | | – | | 41 | 7 |
| Tottenham Hotspur | 1999–2000 | Premier League | 36 | 4 | 2 | 1 | 2 | 1 | 3 | 0 | – | | 43 | 6 |
| Tottenham Hotspur | Total | | 100 | 13 | 11 | 5 | 10 | 4 | 3 | 0 | – | | 124 | 22 |
| Aston Villa | 2000–01 | Premier League | 27 | 3 | 1 | 0 | 0 | 0 | – | | – | | 28 | 3 |
| Aston Villa | 2001–02 | Premier League | 5 | 0 | 0 | 0 | 2 | 0 | 6 | 2 | – | | 13 | 2 |
| Aston Villa | Total | | 32 | 3 | 1 | 0 | 2 | 0 | 6 | 2 | – | | 41 | 5 |
| Everton | 2001–02 | Premier League | 5 | 0 | 2 | 0 | 0 | 0 | – | | – | | 7 | 0 |
| Career total | | | 503 | 81 | 46 | 15 | 21 | 4 | 43 | 8 | 1 | 0 | 614 | 108 |

=== International ===
Appearances and goals by national team and year
| National team | Year | Apps | Goals |
|---|---|---|---|
| France | 1990 | 1 | 0 |
| France | 1991 | 0 | 0 |
| France | 1992 | 2 | 0 |
| France | 1993 | 4 | 1 |
| France | 1994 | 6 | 1 |
| France | 1995 | 4 | 1 |
| Total | | 17 | 3 |

== Honours ==
RC Paris

- Coupe de France runner-up: 1989–90

Paris Saint-Germain

- Division 1: 1993–94
- Coupe de France: 1992–93, 1994–95
- Coupe de la Ligue: 1994–95

Tottenham Hotspur

- Football League Cup: 1998–99

Aston Villa

- UEFA Intertoto Cup: 2001

France U21

- Toulon Tournament: 1987, 1988

France

- Kirin Cup: 1994

Individual

- Toulon Tournament Best Player: 1987
- French Player of the Year: 1993
- Division 1 Player of the Year: 1993–94
- Premier League Player of the Month: August 1995, December 1998
- World XI: 1996
- PFA Team of the Year: 1995–96 Premier League, 1998–99 Premier League
- Tottenham Hotspur Player of the Year: 1998
- PFA Players' Player of the Year: 1998–99
- FWA Footballer of the Year: 1998–99

== See also ==
- List of celebrities who own wineries and vineyards
