= Théo De Percin =

French footballer (born 2001)

Personal information
- Full name: Théo Franck Mathias De Percin
- Date of birth: 2 February 2001 (age 25)
- Place of birth: Tarbes, Hautes-Pyrénées, France
- Height: 1.85 m (6 ft 1 in)
- Position: Goalkeeper

Team information
- Current team: Bastia (on loan from Auxerre)
- Number: 1

Youth career
- 2007–2010: Séméac Olympique Football
- 2010–2013: Tarbes
- 2013–2015: Créteil
- 2014–2020: Auxerre

Senior career*
Years	Team	Apps	(Gls)
2017–	Auxerre II	42	(0)
2021–	Auxerre	11	(0)
2026–	→ Bastia (loan)	0	(0)

International career
2023	Martinique	1	(0)
- * Club domestic league appearances and goals as of 20 May 2026

Théo Franck Mathias De Percin (born 2 February 2001) is a French professional footballer who plays as a goalkeeper for Ligue 3 club Bastia on loan from Auxerre. Born in metropolitan France, he has played for the Martinique national team.

== Early life ==
De Percin was born in Tarbes, Hautes-Pyrénées, France, and is of Martiniquais descent.

== Club career ==
A youth product of Auxerre since 2014, De Percin signed his first professional contract with the club on 18 March 2021. He made his professional debut with Auxerre in a 3–1 Coupe de France loss to Lille on 18 December 2021.

== International career ==
De Percin debuted for the Martinique national team in a 2–1 loss to Panama in the CONCACAF Gold Cup on 30 June 2023.

On 26 June 2024, De Percin was called up to replace the injured Robin Risser in the France Olympic team ahead of the 2024 Summer Olympics. On 4 July, head coach Thierry Henry announced that De Percin had not been selected in the final squad for the competition, but that he would stay with the group as a reserve player in case of an injury.

== Personal life ==
De Percin is the son of football manager Francis De Percin.

== Career statistics ==
As of match played 13 September 2025

Appearances and goals by club, season and competition
Club	Season	League			National cup		Europe		Other		Total	
Club	Season	Division	Apps	Goals	Apps	Goals	Apps	Goals	Apps	Goals	Apps	Goals
Auxerre II	2017–18	National 3	0	0	—		—		—		0	0
Auxerre II	2018–19	National 3	4	0	—		—		—		4	0
Auxerre II	2019–20	National 3	2	0	—		—		—		2	0
Auxerre II	2020–21	National 2	6	0	—		—		—		6	0
Auxerre II	2021–22	National 2	9	0	—		—		—		9	0
Auxerre II	2022–23	National 2	20	0	—		—		—		20	0
Auxerre II	2023–24	National 2	1	0	—		—		—		1	0
Auxerre II	Total		42	0	—		—		—		42	0
Auxerre	2020–21	Ligue 2	0	0	0	0	—		—		0	0
Auxerre	2021–22	Ligue 2	0	0	2	0	—		0	0	2	0
Auxerre	2022–23	Ligue 1	0	0	0	0	—		—		0	0
Auxerre	2023–24	Ligue 2	1	0	3	0	—		—		4	0
Auxerre	2024–25	Ligue 1	2	0	0	0	—		—		2	0
Auxerre	2025–26	Ligue 1	3	0	0	0	—		—		3	0
Auxerre	Total		6	0	5	0	—		—		11	0
Career total			48	0	5	0	0	0	0	0	53	0
