= Francis De Percin =

French footballer and manager (born 1969)

Personal information
- Date of birth: 8 October 1969 (age 57)
- Place of birth: Paris, France
- Height: 1.85 m (6 ft 1 in)
- Position: Right-back

Team information
- Current team: Laval (assistant)

Youth career
- Fresnes
- 1984–1986: US Alfortville
- 1986–1989: Paris Saint-Germain

Senior career*
Years	Team	Apps	(Gls)
1986–1992	Paris Saint-Germain B		
1992–1993	Paris FC		
1993–1996	Tarbes		
1996–2002	FC Plateau Lannemezan		

Managerial career
- 2002–2004: Tarbes
- 2004–2005: FC Nestes
- 2009–2011: Tarbes
- 2011–2014: Créteil (assistant)
- 2014–2015: Créteil
- 2015–2018: Créteil (assistant)
- 2017: Créteil
- 2018–2021: Grenoble (assistant)
- 2021–2023: Amiens (assistant)
- 2023-: Laval (assistant)
- * Club domestic league appearances and goals

Francis "Tanase" De Percin (born 8 October 1969) is a French professional football manager and former player who is an assistant coach at Ligue 2 club Laval. As a player, he was a right-back.

== Playing career ==
A right-sided full-back, De Percin is a product of the Paris Saint-Germain Academy. He played for Paris Saint-Germain's reserve side in the Division 3 until 1992, when he left the club to join neighboring club Paris FC, also in the Division 3. After a season at the club, De Percin signed for Championnat National 3 side Tarbes. In 1996, he signed for FC Plateau Lannemezan, where he would play until his retirement in 2002. While playing for the senior team, he was the head of the club's youth academy.

== Coaching career ==
In 2002, following his retirement from his playing career, De Percin joined his former club Tarbes as head coach. He left after two seasons, joining FC Nestes as manager. De Percin made his return to Tarbes in 2005, although as a youth coach. In 2009, he returned to his former position of head coach at the club, a role he would be in for two seasons.

In 2011, De Percin joined Créteil as an assistant manager. In the 2014–15 season in Ligue 2, he briefly stepped up as manager, coaching the side for four games before returning to his role of assistant manager. In 2017, he endured another brief spell as caretaker manager of Créteil. De Percin left the club in 2018 to join Grenoble as an assistant coach, reuniting with his former Créteil manager Philippe Hinschberger. In 2021, he joined Amiens in the same type of position, following Hinschberger's path.

== Personal life ==
De Percin was born in metropolitan France but is of Martiniquais descent. His son Théo De Percin (born in 2001), is a professional footballer. The godfather of Francis De Percin's daughter is Jean-Luc Vasseur.

== Honours ==
=== Player ===
Paris Saint-Germain

- Coupe Gambardella runner-up: 1989
