= Emmanuel Dorado =

French footballer (born 1973)

Personal information
- Full name: Emmanuel Dorado Rodríguez
- Date of birth: 28 March 1973 (age 53)
- Place of birth: Brou-sur-Chantereine, France
- Height: 1.88 m (6 ft 2 in)
- Position: Centre-back

Team information
- Current team: Sainte-Geneviève (coach)

Youth career
- ASCC Chelles
- 1986–1991: Paris Saint-Germain

Senior career*
Years	Team	Apps	(Gls)
1991–1994	Paris Saint-Germain B		
1994–1996	Angers	37	(1)
1996–1998	Almería	64	(1)
1998–2002	Málaga	29	(0)
2000–2001	→ Córdoba (loan)	14	(0)
2002–2006	Livingston	82	(0)

Managerial career
- 2008–: Sainte-Geneviève
- * Club domestic league appearances and goals

Emmanuel Dorado Rodríguez (born 28 March 1973) is a French former professional footballer who played as a central defender. He coaches Sainte-Geneviève Sports.

== Career ==
Dorado played for European clubs such as Paris Saint-Germain, Angers SCO, UD Almería, Málaga CF, and Córdoba CF.

Dorado was at the centre of an unpaid wages controversy while at Livingston following the side's relegation from the Scottish Premier League. The Scottish Football League imposed a transfer embargo on Livingston due to their failure to settle Dorado's contract. Livingston argued that they have settled the contract and that the embargo should be lifted. He contributed to their victorious 2003–04 Scottish League Cup campaign, including playing the full 90 minutes as they beat Hibernian in the 2004 Scottish League Cup Final.

The embargo was lifted from Livingston on the introduction of a new board of Italians, who paid the overdue wages.

== Managerial career ==
Dorado has worked as the manager of Sainte-Geneviève Sports since 2008. Jean-Claude Fernandes, his teammate at Paris Saint-Germain, is currently the sporting director of the club.
