= Tarbes Pyrénées Football =

French football club

Tarbes Pyrénées
- Full name: Tarbes Pyrénées Football
- Founded: 2006; 19 years ago (1963; as Tarbes Stado)
- Ground: Stade Maurice Trélut, Tarbes, France
- Capacity: 3,000 (1,200 seated)
- Chairman: Jean-Michel Nérin
- Manager: Pavlé Vostanic
- League: Regional 1, Occitanie
- 2018–19: National 3 Group H, 14th (relegated)
- Website: http://tarbespf.com
Home colours	Away colours

Tarbes Pyrénées Football is a club football based in Tarbes, France. They formed in 2006 with the merger of Tarbes Stado Foot and Tarbes Gespe.

== Club information ==
The club colours are red and violet which represent the main colours of the two merged clubs: the red of Tarbes Foot and the violet of Gespe. To reflect this the teams do not wear colours in the traditional home/away sense. Instead they rotate their strips as they feel appropriate from match to match.

The club badge represents the mountainous landscape of the pyrenees with two stars in the sky that represent the original clubs.

The club's highest accolade was winning the DH Midi-Pyrenees Championship in 2006 and achieving promotion to the French CFA2.

== Stadium ==
Home games are played at the Tarbes Maurice-Trelut sports complex. The football ground is the second largest stadium in the complex, after the rugby stadium. In the complex the football stadium has a capacity of 3000 (1150 seats) and is located next to the main stadium, Stade Maurice-Trelut (16400/12500) which is sometimes used for matches with higher attendances.

== Current squad ==
As of 22 March 2019

Note: Flags indicate national team as defined under FIFA eligibility rules; some limited exceptions apply. Players may hold more than one non-FIFA nationality.

No.	Pos.	Nation	Player
—	GK	(France) FRA	Sébastien Bobeau
—	GK	(France) FRA	Andrea Gambetta
—	GK	(France) FRA	Ruben Liberato
—	DF	(France) FRA	Paul Bentayou
—	DF	(France) FRA	Quentin Blanchard
—	DF	(France) FRA	Jean-Salomon Gweth
—	DF	(France) FRA	Anthony Managau
—	DF	(France) FRA	Gauthier Subervielle
—	MF	(France) FRA	Alexandre Amorin
—	MF	(France) FRA	Joshua Curtius
—	MF	(France) FRA	Mike Dos Santos

No.	Pos.	Nation	Player
—	MF	(France) FRA	Lucas Ramoussin
—	MF	(Madagascar) MAD	Héry Randriantsara
—	MF	(France) FRA	Faris Sinare
—	MF	(France) FRA	Theophile Vavala
—	MF	(Senegal) SEN	Birane Ba
—	FW	(France) FRA	Thomas Amare
—	FW	(France) FRA	Jérémy Diaz
—	FW	(France) FRA	Thomas Perchaud
—	FW	(France) FRA	Emmanuel Rodrigues
—	FW	(France) FRA	Jordy Védère

== Famous players ==
- (France) Théo De Percin (youth)
