= Patrick Colleter =

French footballer (born 1965)

Personal information
- Full name: Patrick Colleter
- Date of birth: 6 November 1965 (age 60)
- Place of birth: Brest, France
- Height: 1.78 m (5 ft 10 in)
- Position: Full-back

Team information
- Current team: Al-Nassr (Assistant coach)

Senior career*
Years	Team	Apps	(Gls)
1986–1990	Brest	126	(9)
1990–1991	Montpellier	31	(0)
1991–1996	Paris Saint-Germain	157	(1)
1996–1997	Bordeaux	30	(1)
1997–1998	Marseille	41	(0)
1998–2000	Southampton	24	(1)
2000–2002	Cannes	15	(0)
2003	Saint-Médard-en-Jalles		

International career
1988	Brittany indoor	1	
- * Club domestic league appearances and goals

Patrick Colleter (born 6 November 1965) is a French former professional footballer who played as a full-back.

== Career ==
=== Early career ===
Colleter begin his football career with his local team Brest in 1986. After some impressive performances, Colleter was rewarded with a call-up to the French B national team, and a transfer to Montpellier in 1990. After one season at the southern club he spent five seasons at Paris Saint-Germain, where he won the Ligue 1 in 1994, the Coupe de France in 1993 and 1995 and the Coupe de la Ligue in 1995 as well as the UEFA Cup Winners' Cup in 1996. In 1996, he left Paris to enjoy single-season spells at Bordeaux and Olympique de Marseille.

=== Southampton ===
In December 1998, he was signed by Southampton for £300,000. He made his debut at left-back on 26 December 1998 at home to Chelsea taking the place of the Saints' long-established left-back Francis Benali. He scored one goal for the club, a long-range strike in a 3-1 victory at home to Charlton Athletic on 9 January 1999.

He was a fiery but capable full-back, but his career at Southampton suffered following Dave Jones' replacement as manager by Glenn Hoddle. Hoddle was not keen on the Gallic method of defending and Colleter was left to grow frustrated in the reserves. Colleter eventually left Southampton in November 2000 he moved back to French football with Cannes. In all he played 26 games for Southampton, scoring once.

=== Return to France ===
After two seasons at Cannes, Colleter left in December 2002 to play for Saint-Médard-en-Jalles before becoming a coach at Bordeaux.

== Career statistics ==
Appearances and goals by club, season and competition
Club	Season	League			National cup (Note: Includes Coupe de France, FA Cup.)		League cup (Note: Includes Coupe de la Ligue, Football League Cup.)		Europe		Other		Total	
Club	Season	Division	Apps	Goals	Apps	Goals	Apps	Goals	Apps	Goals	Apps	Goals	Apps	Goals
Brest	1986–87	Division 1	23	2	4	1	—		—		—		27	3
Brest	1987–88	Division 1	37	2	1	0	—		—		—		38	2
Brest	1988–89	Division 2	31	2	8	0	—		—		—		39	2
Brest	1989–90	Division 1	35	3	1	1	—		—		—		36	4
Brest	Total		126	9	14	2	0	0	0	0	0	0	140	11
Montpellier	1990–91	Division 1	31	0	0	0	—		4 (Note: Appearances in Cup Winners' Cup)	1	—		35	1
Paris Saint-Germain	1991–92	Division 1	28	0	1	0	—		—		—		29	0
Paris Saint-Germain	1992–93	Division 1	36	0	6	0	—		10 (Note: Appearances in UEFA Cup)	0	—		52	0
Paris Saint-Germain	1993–94	Division 1	32	0	3	0	—		7	0	—		42	0
Paris Saint-Germain	1994–95	Division 1	28	1	4	0	3	0	8 (Note: Appearances in Champions League)	0	—		43	1
Paris Saint-Germain	1995–96	Division 1	33	0	3	0	1	0	9	0	1 (Note: Appearances in Trophée des Champions)	0	47	0
Paris Saint-Germain	Total		157	1	17	0	4	0	34	0	1	0	213	1
Bordeaux	1996–97	Division 1	30	1	4	0	5	0	—		—		39	1
Marseille	1997–98	Division 1	31	0	2	1	3	0	—		—		36	1
Marseille	1998–99	Division 1	10	0	0	0	0	0	3	0	—		13	0
Marseille	Total		41	0	2	1	3	0	3	0	0	0	49	1
Southampton	1998–99	Premier League	16	1	2	0	0	0	—		—		18	1
Southampton	1999–2000	Premier League	8	0	0	0	1	0	—		—		9	0
Southampton	Total		24	1	2	0	1	0	0	0	0	0	27	1
Cannes	2000–01	Division 2	15	0	0	0	1	0	—		—		16	0
Career total			424	12	39	3	14	0	41	1	1	0	519	16

== Honours ==
Paris Saint-Germain

- Ligue 1: 1994
- Coupe de France: 1993 and 1995
- Coupe de la Ligue: 1995
- Trophée des Champions: 1995
- UEFA Cup Winners' Cup: 1996
