= Sainte-Geneviève Sports =

French sports club

Sainte-Geneviève
- Full name: Sainte-Geneviève Sports
- Founded: 1936
- Ground: Léo Lagrange
- Capacity: 3,000
- President: Jean-Hugues Dussere
- Manager: Emmanuel Dorado
- League: National 3 Group H
- 2022–23: National 2 Group B, 15th
- Website: https://www.sgsomnisports.fr

Sainte-Geneviève Sports is a French multi-sport club based in Sainte-Geneviève-des-Bois, Essonne. It was founded in 1936. The senior football team plays at the Stade Léo Lagrange, and competes in the Championnat National 3. The colours of the club are red and white.
