= Dominique Leclercq =

French football player and manager (born 1957)

Personal information
- Date of birth: 30 November 1957 (age 68)
- Place of birth: Hazebrouck, France
- Height: 1.71 m (5 ft 7 in)
- Position: Goalkeeper

Youth career
- 1970–1974: Béthune
- 1974–1976: Lens

Senior career*
Years	Team	Apps	(Gls)
1974–1976	Lens B		
1976–1980	Lens	27	(0)
1980–1985	Nantes	19	(0)
1981–1985	Nantes B		
1985–1987	RC Paris	10	(0)
1987–1989	Lille	4	(0)
1989–1990	Lens	3	(0)
1990–1992	Paris Saint-Germain	0	(0)
Total		63+	(0+)

Managerial career
- 1992–1999: Paris Saint-Germain B
- 2005: Paris Saint-Germain (assistant)
- 2007–2008: Amiens B
- * Club domestic league appearances and goals

Dominique Leclercq (born 30 November 1957) is a French former professional football player and manager. In his playing days, he was a goalkeeper.

== Club career ==
Leclercq is an academy graduate of Lens. He made his debut for the club's senior side in the 1976–77 season in the Division 1. After having made 27 league appearances for the club, he joined Nantes in 1980. At Nantes, Leclercq made 21 first-team appearances, while also playing for the club's reserve side across his spell at the club. He left in 1985 when he joined RC Paris.

At RC Paris, Leclercq won promotion from the Division 2 to the Division 1 in the 1985–86 season. He played nine games for the side in the Division 1 before signing for Lille in 1987. Two years later, Leclercq returned to Lens. Following a season at the club, he signed for his final team before retiring, Paris Saint-Germain (PSG). He made no appearances for PSG and retired in 1992.

== International career ==
Leclercq was a France youth international. He represented his nation at under-21 level.

== Post-playing career ==
Following his retirement in 1992, Leclercq became the manager of Paris Saint-Germain's reserve team. He stayed in this position for seven years, becoming the goalkeeping coach of the club's senior team in 1999. In February 2005, Leclercq's role within the coaching staff changed, and he became an assistant manager at the club. In December 2005, he left his role as PSG assistant coach to join neighboring club Paris FC as sporting director and youth coach.

In 2007, after two years at Paris FC, Leclercq joined Amiens as reserve team manager. He only coached the side for a season before switching to the role of first-team goalkeeping coach. In 2012, Leclercq retired from coaching, leaving Amiens.

== Honours ==
RC Paris

- Division 2: 1985–86
