= Joël Cloarec =

French footballer and manager (born 1966)

Personal information
- Date of birth: 5 February 1966 (age 60)
- Place of birth: Quimper, France
- Height: 1.78 m (5 ft 10 in)
- Position: Forward

Team information
- Current team: La Vitréenne (manager)

Youth career
- –1984: La Forêt-Fouesnant

Senior career*
Years	Team	Apps	(Gls)
1984–1986	Concarneau		
1986–1991	Brest	91+ (Note: Statistics for the 1986–87 season are missing.)	(6+)
1991–1992	Châteauroux	11	(3)
1992–1994	Paris Saint-Germain	1	(0)
1993–1994	→ Valenciennes (loan)	38	(0)
1994–1996	Guingamp	36	(0)
1996–1997	Stade Briochin	23	(1)
1997–2002	Vitré		

International career
1988	Brittany	1	(1)

Managerial career
- 2000–2011: Vitré
- 2011–2013: Bonchamp
- 2013–2014: La Vitréenne
- 2016–2017: La Vitréenne
- 2017–2018: La Vitréenne (assistant)
- 2020–: La Vitréenne
- * Club domestic league appearances and goals

Joël Cloarec (born 5 February 1966) is a French football manager and former player who is the head coach of French club La Vitréenne. As a player, he was a forward.

== Club career ==
Cloarec made his first steps as a pro with Concarneau in 1984. He would go on to play for the club until 1986, when he joined fellow Breton club Brest. In 1991, Cloarec left Brest to sign for Châteauroux, where he would spend a season before joining Paris Saint-Germain (PSG). At PSG, he was a victim of tough competition, and he only played one minute the entire season, as he was substituted on for David Ginola during a 2–1 Division 1 victory away to Saint-Étienne on 8 August 1992. He holds the record for the shortest amount of time played for PSG. After the end of the 1992–93 season, Cloarec was sent out on loan to Valenciennes, where he played 38 league games in the Division 2. Following his loan stint, he returned to Paris, but the PSG manager at the time, Artur Jorge, decided not to keep him; therefore, he returned to his native Brittany to play for Guingamp.

In 1996, Cloarec signed for Guingamp's neighbors Stade Briochin. After just a season in Saint-Brieuc, he moved on to Vitré, the club at which he would eventually retire in 2002.

== International career ==
Cloarec played one match for Brittany regional team in 1988. He scored one of the goals in a 6–2 victory over in the United States in an indoor setting.

== Post-playing career ==
From 2000 to 2002, Cloarec was a player-manager for Vitré. In 2002, he retired from football to take on the full role of manager at the club, a role in which he would stay in until 2011. Cloarec coached Vitré to two Coupe de France round of 16 appearances – one in 2006 and another in 2009. In 2011, he became the head coach of Bonchamp.

During the 2013–14 season, Cloarec was the manager of La Vitréenne. However, he left that role at the end of the season to become a youth coach for the club. In 2016, after two years as a youth coach, he returned to manage the first team for one season. In the 2017–18 season, Cloarec held the position of assistant manager in the first team of La Vitréenne, while simultaneously being the club's sporting director. In 2018, he stopped being assistant manager in order to be solely the sporting director. In 2020, after two years as sporting director, Cloarec returned to coach La Vitréenne.

== Honours ==
=== Manager ===
Vitré

- Championnat de France Amateur 2: 2004–05
