= Morgan (clothing) =

French clothing brand

Groupe Beaumanoir
- Type: SA
- Industry: Clothing retail
- Founded: 1947; 79 years ago
- Headquarters: Paris, France
- Number of locations: 650+
- Area served: Worldwide
- Key people: CEO : Yann Jaslet
- Products: Clothing
- Website: morgandetoi.com

Morgan de toi is a clothing brand, owned by the French company Morgan SA. The company was established in 1947 to sell lingerie, but has since diversified.

At present it has over 650 retail outlets worldwide. Production is vertically integrated and takes place mainly in France. The brand is targeted at women between the ages of 18 and 35. The CEO is Yann Jaslet and the headquarters are in Paris.

Morgan operates worldwide in the following arenas:

- retail stores,
- licensed stores,
- wholesale,
- mail order,
- 3rd party internet

The UK operation had moved to 7 Back Hill, London, and appointed Fergus Patterson as their managing director. The business operated stand alone retail sites as well as numerous concessions in leading department stores such as Debenhams and House of Fraser. In 2006, the company went into administration, while the French business went insolvent by December 2008.

In Friends' episode The One With Ross's Thing, Phoebe wears a Morgan t-shirt.
