= Roméo Calenda =

French footballer (born 1972)

Personal information
- Date of birth: 21 August 1972 (age 54)
- Place of birth: Meulan, France
- Position: Midfielder

Team information
- Current team: ES Saint-Benoit
- Number: 10

Youth career
- Paris SG

Senior career*
Years	Team	Apps	(Gls)
1993–1997	Paris SG	1	(0)
1994–1996	→ Châteauroux (loan)	68	(2)
1997–1999	Laval	72	(3)
1999–2004	Valence	106	(8)
2004–2005	Poitiers	1	(0)
2007–	ES Saint-Benoit	79	(3)
- * Club domestic league appearances and goals

Roméo Calenda (born 21 August 1972) is a French football player, who currently plays for ES Saint-Benoit.

== Career ==
He was part of Paris SG squad at the 1996 UEFA Super Cup.
