= Stéphane Moreau =

French footballer (born 1971)

Personal information
- Date of birth: 1 January 1971 (age 55)
- Place of birth: Nantes
- Position: Defender

Team information
- Current team: FC Nantes (U19 coach)

Senior career*
Years	Team	Apps	(Gls)
1990–1995	FC Nantes		
1995–1998	SM Caen		
1998–2003	Laval		

Managerial career
- 2004–2008: FC Nantes B
- 2008–2009: FC Nantes (U19)
- 2012–2019: Laval (U17)
- 2019: Laval B
- 2019–2023: Paris Saint-Germain (U17)
- * Club domestic league appearances and goals

Stéphane Moreau (born 1 January 1971) is a retired French football defender. He is currently U19 coach of Nantes.

== Coaching career ==
After retiring in 2003, Moreau began his coaching career at Laval as a youth coach. In 2004, he took charge of FC Nantes's reserve team and later in 2008 the 18 ans team at the club.

In June 2009, Moreau returned to Laval as director of the youth sector and later also as U17 manager. In February 2019, he took charge of Laval's reserve team. After 10 years at Laval as director of the youth sector, he left the club in the summer 2019 and was hired as U17 manager for Paris Saint-Germain.
