= 1994–95 French Division 2 =

56th season of the second-tier football league in France

Division 2
- Season: 1994–95
- Champions: Olympique de Marseille
- Promoted: En Avant Guingamp; FC Gueugnon
- Relegated: Stade Briochin; AS Beauvais; CS Sedan Ardennes; Nîmes Olympique
- Matches played: 462
- Top goalscorer: Tony Cascarino (31 goals)

The Division 2 season 1994/1995, organised by the LNF was won by Olympique de Marseille and saw the promotions of En Avant Guingamp and FC Gueugnon, whereas Stade Briochin, AS Beauvais, CS Sedan Ardennes and Nîmes Olympique were relegated to National.

== 22 participating teams ==
- Alès
- Amiens
- Angers
- Beauvais
- Charleville
- Châteauroux
- Dunkerque
- Gueugnon
- Guingamp
- Laval
- Le Mans
- Marseille
- Mulhouse
- Nancy
- Nîmes
- Niort
- Perpignan
- Red Star
- Saint-Brieuc
- Sedan
- Toulouse
- Valence

== League table ==
Pos	Team	Pld	W	D	L	GF	GA	GD	Pts	Promotion or Relegation
1	Marseille (C)	42	25	9	8	72	34	+38	84	
2	Guingamp (P)	42	23	12	7	51	32	+19	81	Promotion to French Division 1
3	Gueugnon (P)	42	24	8	10	62	40	+22	80	Promotion to French Division 1
4	Toulouse	42	22	11	9	69	43	+26	77	
5	Châteauroux	42	19	14	9	56	34	+22	71	
6	Red Star	42	19	13	10	55	44	+11	70	
7	Nancy	42	15	18	9	46	39	+7	63	
8	Dunkerque	42	14	18	10	42	38	+4	60	
9	Amiens	42	15	13	14	59	61	−2	58	
10	Alès	42	12	17	13	44	44	0	53	
11	Charleville	42	11	19	12	45	49	−4	52	
12	Le Mans	42	11	16	15	46	48	−2	49	
13	Valence	42	11	16	15	46	52	−6	49	
14	Mulhouse	42	12	13	17	49	58	−9	49	
15	Laval	42	9	17	16	42	56	−14	44	
16	Perpignan	42	9	17	16	35	51	−16	44	
17	Niort	42	8	19	15	34	49	−15	43	
18	Angers	42	10	12	20	38	50	−12	42	
19	Saint-Brieuc (R)	42	11	9	22	38	53	−15	42	Relegation to Championnat National 1 [fr]
20	Beauvais (R)	42	9	15	18	50	66	−16	42	Relegation to Championnat National 1 [fr]
21	Sedan (R)	42	10	11	21	34	60	−26	41	Relegation to Championnat National 1 [fr]
22	Nîmes (R)	42	9	11	22	48	60	−12	38	Relegation to Championnat National 1 [fr]

Source: Ligue 2
(C) Champions; (P) Promoted; (R) Relegated

== Recap ==
- Promoted to L1 : En Avant Guingamp, FC Gueugnon (Olympique de Marseille was not promoted due to financial problems)
- Relegated to L2 : SM Caen, FC Sochaux-Montbéliard
- Promoted to L2 : FC Lorient, Stade Poitevin, SAS Épinal, CS Louhans-Cuiseaux
- Relegated to National : Stade Briochin, AS Beauvais, CS Sedan Ardennes, Nîmes Olympique

== Results ==
Home \ Away	ALÈ	AMI	ANG	BEA	CHR	CHA	DUN	GUE	GUI	LAV	MFC	OM	MUL	NAL	NMS	NRT	PER	RS	SBR	SED	TFC	VLN
Alès		1–1	1–0	3–2	0–2	1–1	3–1	0–1	1–1	1–1	0–0	1–1	1–1	0–0	2–0	3–0	2–0	1–1	2–0	0–0	0–0	1–0
Amiens	1–0		1–1	4–2	1–1	2–1	1–1	2–1	0–0	3–1	2–0	1–2	0–0	0–1	2–3	0–0	2–0	3–4	3–2	3–1	0–0	1–0
Angers	3–0	1–1		2–0	1–2	2–2	1–1	0–3	0–0	0–1	1–1	1–1	3–0	1–2	2–0	1–0	0–1	1–1	2–1	3–1	0–2	1–0
Beauvais	0–2	4–0	2–2		1–1	1–3	1–1	1–2	0–1	1–0	2–2	2–1	1–0	2–0	1–1	1–2	2–1	0–0	0–1	2–1	1–4	1–0
Charleville	0–0	1–1	2–0	2–2		0–2	0–0	2–0	3–3	2–2	2–2	1–0	0–1	1–1	3–1	4–1	1–1	1–0	1–0	1–1	2–1	1–1
Châteauroux	1–0	2–1	0–0	2–1	4–0		3–2	0–1	1–0	0–0	3–0	0–0	2–0	1–1	1–1	2–0	1–1	2–1	2–0	0–1	2–2	0–0
Dunkerque	1–1	1–1	1–0	1–1	1–0	1–0		2–0	1–0	0–0	2–0	2–2	1–0	2–0	1–3	0–0	1–1	0–1	1–0	0–0	0–0	2–1
Gueugnon	2–1	1–2	2–1	1–0	1–1	2–2	1–0		2–0	1–0	1–0	0–0	1–1	1–1	2–1	3–1	4–1	2–0	2–3	3–1	3–1	0–0
Guingamp	1–2	2–0	1–0	3–2	1–0	3–0	1–0	2–1		1–0	2–0	1–1	2–1	1–0	2–2	0–0	2–0	1–0	1–0	2–0	1–0	1–2
Laval	1–1	2–2	2–0	2–2	3–0	1–3	3–3	2–1	0–1		0–0	1–3	1–2	2–1	3–0	1–0	3–2	0–1	0–0	1–1	0–1	0–0
Le Mans	1–0	2–1	2–0	4–0	2–1	3–0	0–2	0–0	2–3	2–1		0–2	0–0	0–1	1–1	0–0	4–0	1–1	1–0	0–1	1–1	1–1
Marseille	1–0	5–0	2–1	3–1	3–1	0–4	5–1	3–0	0–1	5–0	2–3		3–0	0–2	2–1	1–0	2–1	3–0	2–0	2–0	1–0	1–0
Mulhouse	1–1	3–4	1–1	1–1	1–0	0–0	1–1	2–1	2–0	1–1	3–3	0–1		3–3	0–1	1–0	4–1	2–0	1–0	4–1	1–1	1–2
Nancy	0–0	2–1	2–0	1–0	2–3	2–1	1–1	0–2	0–0	2–2	3–1	1–1	2–0		1–0	1–0	2–0	1–1	1–1	1–1	1–3	0–0
Nîmes	2–4	1–2	4–1	1–1	1–1	1–2	0–0	0–2	3–0	0–0	1–1	0–1	1–2	0–1		3–2	2–0	0–1	0–0	3–1	0–1	4–0
Niort	2–1	0–0	0–1	1–1	0–0	0–0	1–0	1–1	1–2	2–2	2–2	0–3	2–1	0–0	1–0		1–0	2–2	2–1	1–2	1–1	1–1
Perpignan	1–0	2–1	0–0	3–3	0–0	0–0	0–1	2–2	1–1	0–0	0–0	0–0	4–0	2–2	2–0	0–0		1–2	1–0	1–0	1–3	1–1
Red Star	4–0	3–1	2–1	0–2	0–0	2–1	2–0	0–3	1–1	0–1	2–0	2–1	5–3	1–1	2–0	1–2	1–0		1–1	1–0	0–0	3–1
Saint-Brieuc	2–1	2–3	3–1	3–0	2–0	0–2	0–2	0–2	1–2	2–0	1–1	1–2	1–0	1–1	2–1	1–1	0–1	0–0		1–0	2–2	1–0
Sedan	2–2	1–0	1–2	1–0	1–0	1–0	1–4	0–1	1–3	3–1	1–3	1–1	0–2	1–0	2–2	0–0	0–0	0–1	1–0		1–4	1–1
Toulouse	3–1	2–1	1–0	1–1	4–2	0–1	2–0	2–0	1–1	3–0	1–0	0–2	2–1	1–0	3–2	3–2	1–2	2–3	4–1	2–0		3–1
Valence	2–3	2–4	0–0	2–2	0–0	0–2	0–0	2–3	0–0	3–1	1–0	3–1	3–1	1–2	2–1	2–2	0–0	2–2	3–1	2–1	4–1	

Source: Ligue 2
Legend: Blue = home team win; Yellow = draw; Red = away team win.

== Top goalscorers ==
Rank	Player	Club	Goals
1	(Republic of Ireland) Tony Cascarino	Marseille	31
2	(France) François Calderaro	Toulouse	25
3	(France) Bruno Roux	Châteauroux	23
3	(Senegal) Amara Traoré	Gueugnon	23
3	(France) Stéphane Guivarc'h	Guingamp	23
6	(Brazil) Flavio Cuca	Mulhouse	22
7	(France) Patrick Weiss	Valence	20
8	(Belgium) Patrick Van Kets	Le Mans	17
9	(France) Stéphane Adam	Amiens	16
9	(France) Réginald Ray	Saint-Brieuc	16
