= Bruno Germain =

French footballer (born 1960)

Personal information
- Date of birth: 28 April 1960 (age 66)
- Place of birth: Orléans, France
- Height: 1.74 m (5 ft 9 in)
- Position: Defensive midfielder

Senior career*
Years	Team	Apps	(Gls)
1977–1982	Orléans		
1982–1986	Nancy		
1986–1988	Matra Racing		
1988–1989	Toulon		
1989–1991	Marseille	80	(8)
1991–1993	Paris Saint-Germain	43	(3)
1993–1994	Angers		
1994–1995	Marseille	27	(3)

International career
1987	France	1	(0)

Managerial career
- April 2007–: Orléans Sport director
- * Club domestic league appearances and goals

Bruno Germain (born 28 April 1960) is a former professional footballer who played as a defensive midfielder. In his playing career, he played for seven French clubs, most notably Marseille and Paris Saint-Germain, being capped once for France. Germain is the father of former Monaco, Nice, Marseille, Montpellier, and current Sanfrecce Hiroshima player Valère Germain.

== Honours ==
Marseille

- Ligue 1: 1989, 1990, 1991
- UEFA Champions League runner-up: 1991
- Ligue 2: 1995
- Coupe de France: 1989

Paris Saint-Germain

- Coupe de France: 1993
