= Jean-Luc Sassus =

French footballer (1962-2015)

Personal information
- Date of birth: 4 October 1962
- Place of birth: Tarbes, France
- Date of death: 22 May 2015 (aged 52)
- Place of death: Toulouse, France
- Height: 1.83 m (6 ft 0 in)
- Position: Defender

Senior career*
Years	Team	Apps	(Gls)
1979–1986	Toulouse	107	(10)
1986–1992	Cannes	189	(13)
1992–1994	Paris Saint-Germain	76	(4)
1994–1997	Lyon	104	(2)
1997–1998	Saint-Étienne	17	(4)
Total		493	(31)

International career
1992	France	1	(0)
- * Club domestic league appearances and goals

Jean-Luc Sassus (4 October 1962 – 22 May 2015) was a French international footballer who played as a defender. He died of a heart attack on 22 May 2015.

Sassus began his football career with Toulouse, before playing professionally for Cannes, PSG, Lyon and Saint-Étienne. He won Ligue 1 with PSG in 1994.

After he retired from playing football, Sassus became a player's agent.

== Honours ==
Paris Saint-Germain

- Coupe de France: 1993
- Ligue 1: 1994
