= Antoine Kombouaré =

French football manager (born 1963)

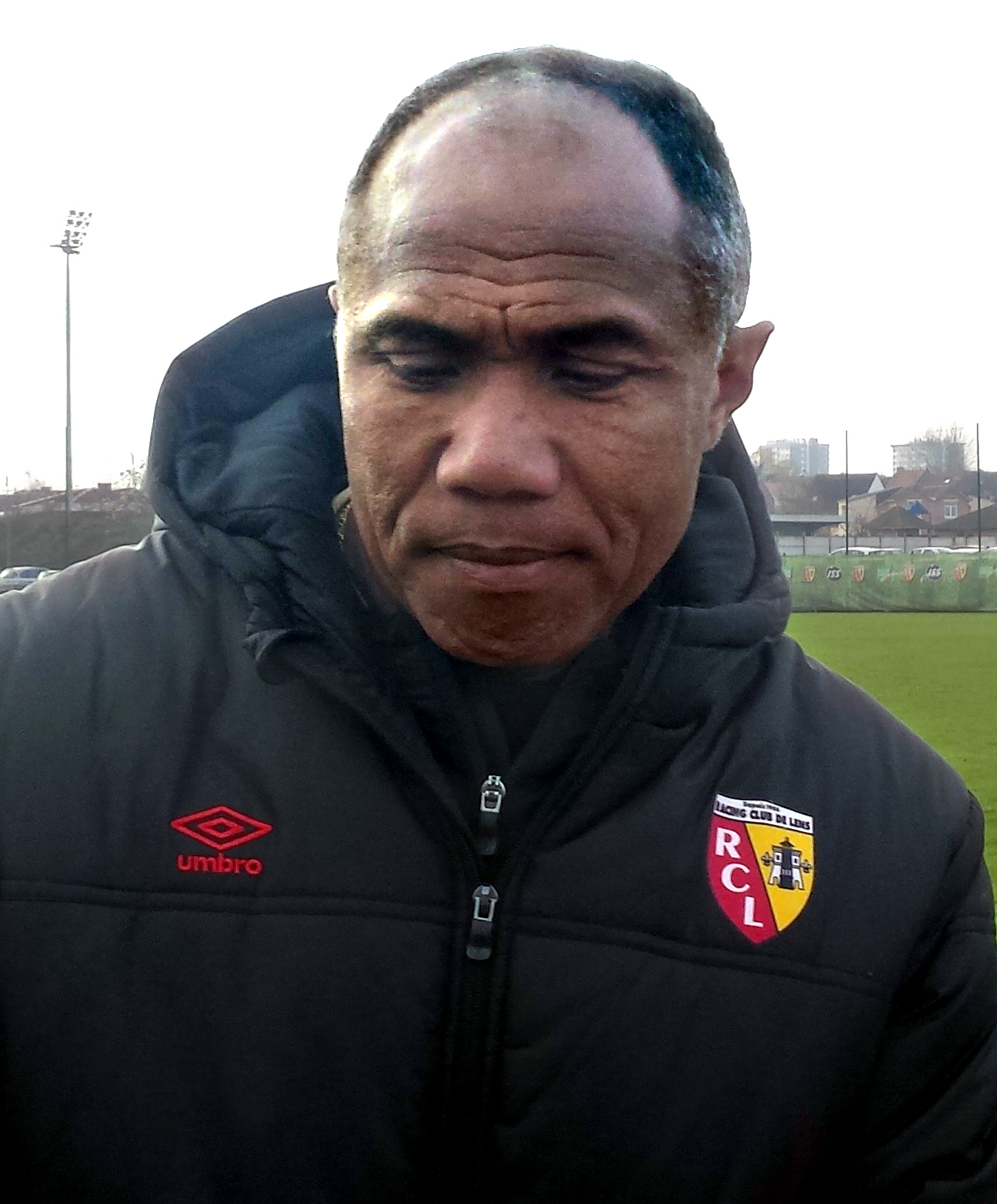
- Kombouaré as Lens manager in 2014

Personal information
- Full name: Antoine Krilone Kombouaré
- Date of birth: 16 November 1963 (age 63)
- Place of birth: Nouméa, New Caledonia, France
- Height: 1.85 m (6 ft 1 in)
- Position: Defender

Youth career
- 1975–1983: WS Plum Nouméa

Senior career*
Years	Team	Apps	(Gls)
1983–1990	Nantes	177	(4)
1990–1995	Paris Saint-Germain	106	(3)
1995–1996	Sion	25	(7)
1996–1998	Aberdeen	44	(3)
1998–1999	RC Paris	24	(4)
Total		376	(21)

Managerial career
- 1999–2003: Paris Saint-Germain B
- 2003–2004: Strasbourg
- 2005–2009: Valenciennes
- 2009–2011: Paris Saint-Germain
- 2012–2013: Al Hilal
- 2013–2016: Lens
- 2016–2018: Guingamp
- 2019: Dijon
- 2019–2020: Toulouse
- 2021–2023: Nantes
- 2024–2025: Nantes
- 2026: Paris FC
- * Club domestic league appearances and goals

Antoine Krilone Kombouaré (French pronunciation: [ɑ̃twan kɔ̃bwaʁe]; born 16 November 1963) is a French professional football manager and former player. He was most recently the head coach of Ligue 1 side Paris FC.

== Playing career ==
Born in the French overseas territory of New Caledonia, Kombouaré began his career at local club WS Plum Nouméa in Nouméa in 1975, before moving to mainland France with Nantes in 1983. He later joined Paris Saint-Germain in 1990. At the Parisian club, he became famous for a winning header he scored in the dying seconds of a UEFA Cup quarter-final match against Real Madrid during the 1992–93 season. The header qualified PSG for the next round with a 4–1 scoreline. Kombouaré had already scored a decisive goal in similar circumstances against Anderlecht in the previous round. His habit of netting tie-deciding headers earned him the name of "Casque d'Or", which means "Golden Helmet" in French. In 1994–95, during a UEFA Champions League quarter-final against Johan Cruyff's Barcelona "dream team", Kombouaré captained PSG to a resounding and unexpected 2–1 win which qualified the French side for the semi-final, which they lost to AC Milan.

In all, Kombouaré spent five seasons in Paris, winning the Coupe de France in 1993 and 1995 and the Coupe de la Ligue in 1995. Kombouaré scored a penalty in the 1993 Coupe de France Final. He also played nine games in the title-winning side of 1993–94 under Artur Jorge. From 1992–93, he found his first-team appearances restricted by the presence of fellow defenders Alain Roche, Paul Le Guen and Ricardo. Kombouaré became a cult hero among PSG fans for his habit of scoring last-minute winning goals and his presence and composure in big games.

Kombouaré signed for Swiss side Sion in 1995 for an undisclosed fee, then joined Aberdeen a year later for £300,000; he was signed by manager Roy Aitken to add experience to the shaky Aberdeen defence. He made 50 appearances for Aberdeen and scored three goals. He left Aberdeen in May 1998.

== Managerial career ==
=== Strasbourg ===
In 2003, Kombouaré was already being tipped to coach PSG, the club where he made his name as a player, and had spent four years coaching the reserves team with positive results. However, the arrival of Vahid Halilhodžić at the helm forced him to change his plans. He therefore joined Strasbourg where he achieved an impressive 13th spot in the league, playing some good football along the way. However, a poor start to the 2004–05 season prompted him to leave the Alsace-based club.

=== Valenciennes ===
In July 2005, Kombouaré was appointed at Valenciennes, then playing in the second tier of French football. In his first season, he led them to promotion to the top flight, a level from which the club had been relegated in 1993. In the three seasons that followed, Kombouaré helped the club to stabilize itself at the top level of French football. He improved the club's position in every season: 14th in 2006–07, 13th in 2007–08 and 12th in 2008–09, establishing his credentials as a coach who could achieve impressive results on a tight budget.

=== Paris Saint-Germain ===
In May 2009, Kombouaré's former club PSG came calling back to him, offering him the position of manager. He accepted and signed a three-year contract, replacing Paul Le Guen, with whom he had played at Nantes and PSG. In 2009–10, the Parisian club, in spite of its new signings such as Mevlüt Erdinç and Grégory Coupet, performed poorly in the league and finished in mid-table. Kombouaré made up for this by leading the club to success in the Coupe de France, where they beat Monaco in the final.

In 2010–11, he again led the club to the Coupe de France final, which they lost to French champions Lille. In the Coupe de la Ligue, PSG looked set for a final showdown with fierce rivals Marseille, but were stunned by Montpellier in the semi-finals. The side performed much better in the league, finishing fourth in spite of a limited playing squad. The Parisians almost achieved qualification to the Champions League, but were let down by tiredness and an inability to perform when it mattered most. However, the attacking brand of football played under Kombouaré's guidance brought acclaim from both fans and writers for the capital club, with many people agreeing that PSG were playing their best football since Luis Fernández's first spell as coach between 1994 and 1996.

During the 2011–12 season, PSG crashed out of the Coupe de la Ligue and the Europa League during the first half of the season, and on 29 December 2011 – with his club top of the table – Kombouaré was sacked by PSG sporting director Leonardo and replaced by Carlo Ancelotti, putting an end to much speculation about his position at the club. Despite holding top spot in Ligue 1 when he was sacked, the club ultimately finished as runners-up to champions Montpellier.

=== Al-Hilal ===
On 27 June 2012, it was confirmed that Kombouaré was appointed head coach of Saudi Arabian side Al-Hilal on a one-year deal with an option for a second, but he was sacked on 31 January 2013.

=== Lens ===
On 18 June 2013, Kombouaré became manager of Lens, earning his team a promotion in his first season at the club after it finished in second place in Ligue 2.

=== Guingamp ===
On 30 May 2016, Kombouaré became manager of Ligue 1 side Guingamp. They finished the season in mid-table. On 6 November 2018, he was sacked due to poor results.

=== Dijon ===
On 10 January 2019, Kombouaré became manager of Dijon, replacing Olivier Dall'Oglio. After winning the relegation play-off to keep Dijon in Ligue 1, he parted ways with the club on 9 June 2019, with Stéphane Jobard taking over as manager on 20 June.

=== Toulouse ===
On 14 October 2019, Kombouaré was appointed as manager of Toulouse. On 6 January 2020, Toulouse dismissed Kombouaré as manager following the club's 1–0 loss to Championnat National 2 side Saint-Pryvé Saint-Hilaire in the Coupe de France. Under Kombouaré, the club had lost ten matches in a row, leading him to be dismissed and replaced by Denis Zanko.

=== Nantes ===
On 11 February 2021, Kombouaré signed with Ligue 1 side Nantes. He joined the club during the second half of the season, helping Les Canaris stay in Ligue 1. Nantes finished 18th in the league, and won the play-offs against Kombouaré's former side Toulouse.

In the 2021–22 season, Kombouaré led Nantes to a Coupe de France victory. They defeated Nice 1–0 in the final. In the 2022–23 season, Kombouaré led Nantes to a second consecutive Coupe de France final, although they were eventually defeated 5–1 by Toulouse.

On 18 March 2024, after Jocelyn Gourvennec was sacked, Kombouaré was re-appointed as the head coach of Nantes.

=== Paris FC ===
On 22 February 2026, Kombouaré became the head coach of Paris FC. He resigned on 1 July after keeping them in Ligue 1.

== Managerial statistics ==
As of 17 May 2026

Managerial record by team and tenure
Team	From	To	Record							
Team	From	To	G	W	D	L	GF	GA	GD	Win %
Strasbourg	1 July 2003	3 October 2004	49	10	18	21	51	68	−17	20.41
Valenciennes	1 July 2005	1 June 2009	166	59	48	59	184	180	+4	35.54
Paris Saint-Germain	1 June 2009	29 December 2011	134	61	39	34	205	138	+67	45.52
Al-Hilal	27 June 2012	31 January 2013	22	14	3	5	50	24	+26	63.64
Lens	18 June 2013	30 May 2016	126	45	36	45	153	158	−5	35.71
Guingamp	30 May 2016	6 November 2018	100	32	26	42	116	153	−37	32.00
Dijon	10 January 2019	9 June 2019	25	8	4	13	28	37	−9	32.00
Toulouse	14 October 2019	5 January 2020	13	2	0	11	13	30	−17	15.38
Nantes	11 February 2021	9 May 2023	109	38	32	39	140	144	−4	34.86
Nantes	18 March 2024	20 May 2025	44	11	14	19	50	68	−18	25.00
Paris FC	23 February 2026	1 July 2026	11	6	3	2	20	10	+10	54.55
Total			799	286	223	290	1,010	1,010	+0	35.79

== Honours ==
=== Player ===
Paris Saint-Germain

- Division 1: 1993–94, runner-up: 1992–93
- Coupe de France: 1992–93, 1994–95
- Coupe de la Ligue: 1994–95

Sion

- Swiss Cup: 1995–96

=== Manager ===
Valenciennes

- Ligue 2: 2005–06

Paris Saint-Germain

- Coupe de France: 2009–10, runner-up: 2010–11

Lens

- Ligue 2 runner-up: 2013–14

Nantes

- Coupe de France: 2021–22, runner-up: 2022–23

Individual

- Ligue 2 Manager of the Year: 2005–06

=== Orders ===
- Knight of the Legion of Honour: 2015
- Officer of the National Order of Merit: 2022
