= Laurent Fournier =

French footballer (born 1964)

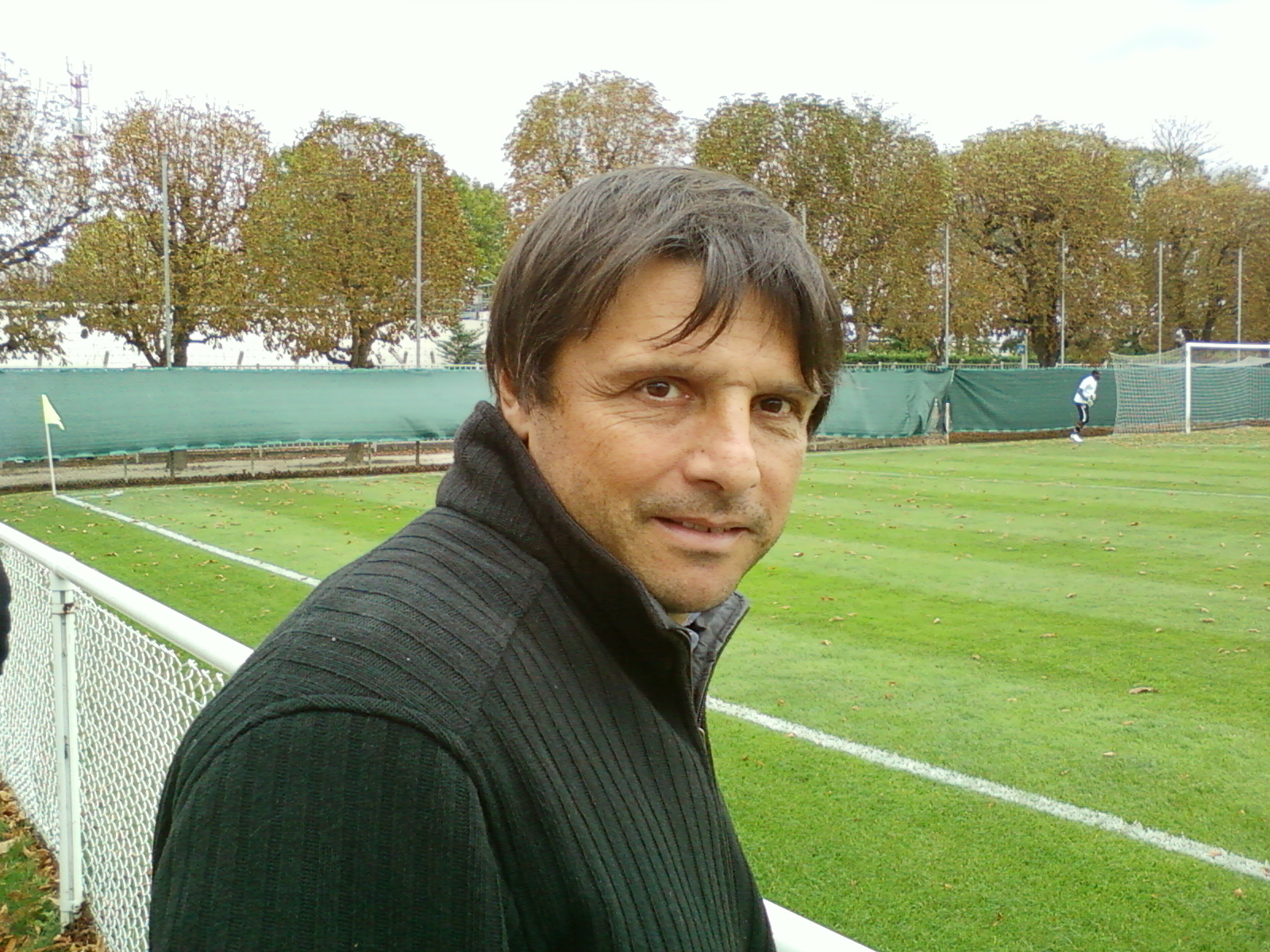
- Fournier in 2011

Personal information
- Date of birth: 14 September 1964 (age 62)
- Place of birth: Lyon, France
- Height: 1.79 m (5 ft 10 in)
- Position: Midfielder

Senior career*
| Years | Team | Apps | (Gls) |
| 1980–1988 | Lyon | 255 | (27) |
| 1988–1990 | Saint-Étienne | 76 | (8) |
| 1990–1991 | Marseille | 28 | (4) |
| 1991–1994 | Paris Saint-Germain | 119 | (13) |
| 1994–1995 | Bordeaux | 41 | (5) |
| 1995–1998 | Paris Saint-Germain | 133 | (5) |
| 1998 | Bastia | 5 | (0) |

International career
| 1992 | France | 3 | (0) |

Managerial career
- 1998–1999: Bastia
- 1999–2002: Feucherolles U-13
- 2003: Pacy Vallée-d'Eure
- 2003–2005: Paris Saint-Germain (reserves)
- 2005: Paris Saint-Germain
- 2007: Nîmes
- 2009–2010: Créteil
- 2010–2011: Strasbourg
- 2011–2012: Auxerre
- 2013: Red Star
- 2016: Créteil
- 2019–2020: Poissy
- * Club domestic league appearances and goals

Laurent Fournier (born 14 September 1964) is a French football manager and former player.

== Managerial career ==
Fournier retired in 1998, immediately becoming manager of his final club SC Bastia in Ligue 1. He was fired in April 1999, and his next jobs were with the under-13 team in the village of Feucherolles, then for amateur team Pacy Vallée-d'Eure. In February 2003 he became reserve team manager of his former club Paris Saint-Germain. Two years later, he became first-team manager upon the dismissal of Vahid Halilhodžić, on a deal to last until the end of the season.

On 26 May 2005, with PSG in 10th place with one game left to play, Fournier was given a new two-year contract. He was axed on 27 December that year, the first managerial casualty of the season, despite being in sixth place and two points off second; he was replaced by Guy Lacombe.

Fournier returned to football on 5 October 2007, taking over Nîmes Olympique until the end of the Championnat National season with a two-year extension if they achieved promotion to Ligue 2. On 4 December, he left by mutual consent.

In June 2009, Fournier was back in the third tier with Créteil. A year later, he signed for two years at Strasbourg who had just fallen into the same league.

Fournier returned to Ligue 1 in June 2011, taking over at Auxerre after Jean Fernandez headed to Nancy. Having won four of 28 games for the bottom-placed team, he was dismissed the following 18 March and replaced by Jean-Guy Wallemme.

In June 2013, Fournier was back in Paris on a two-year deal with the aim of getting Red Star into Ligue 2. He was dismissed on 6 October after five losses from nine games.

Fournier rejoined Créteil in June 2016, again tasked with taking the relegated Béliers back to the second tier. He lasted only until 23 December, when he was ousted from the 14th-placed club.

In June 2019, Fournier was hired by Poissy of the fourth-tier Championnat National 2. Among his players was his eldest son Anthony.

== Honours ==
=== Player ===
Marseille

- Division 1: 1990–91

Paris Saint-Germain

- Division 1: 1993–94
- Coupe de France: 1992–93, 1997–98
- Coupe de la Ligue: 1997–98
- Trophée des Champions: 1995
- UEFA Cup Winners' Cup: 1995–96
