= Daniel Bravo =

French association football player (born 1963)

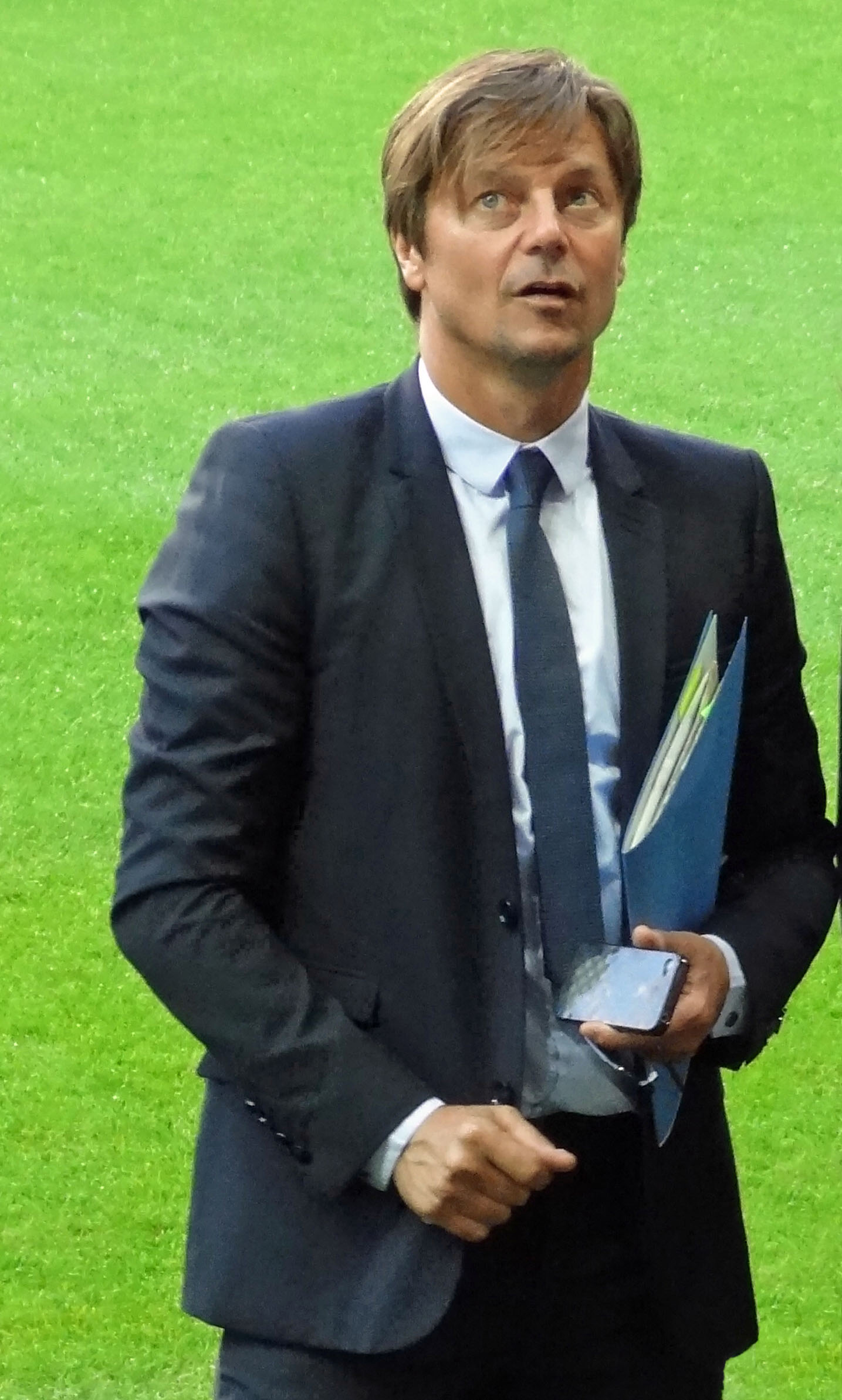
- Bravo in 2012

Personal information
- Full name: Daniel Bravo
- Date of birth: 9 February 1963 (age 63)
- Place of birth: Toulouse, France
- Height: 1.76 m (5 ft 9 in)
- Position: Midfielder

Senior career*
Years	Team	Apps	(Gls)
1980–1983	Nice	91	(18)
1983–1987	Monaco	122	(22)
1987–1989	Nice	50	(18)
1989–1996	Paris Saint-Germain	217	(23)
1996–1997	Parma	24	(0)
1997–1998	Lyon	14	(4)
1998–1999	Marseille	20	(1)
1999–2000	Nice	19	(1)
Total		557	(87)

International career
1982–1989	France	13	(1)
Medal record
Representing France
UEFA European Championship
Winner	1984
- * Club domestic league appearances and goals

Daniel Bravo (French pronunciation: [danjɛl bʁavo]; born 9 February 1963) is a French former professional footballer who played as a midfielder. With the exception of a stint at Serie A's Parma, he spent all of his career in his native France, playing 217 matches for Paris Saint-Germain. He won the UEFA European Championship with France in 1984.

== Career ==
Bravo was born in Toulouse to Spanish immigrants escaping the Spanish civil war settling in southern France. He made his debut for OGC Nice at 17 years of age in a game against Metz in the French Championship D1. Despite the relegation of Nice to D2 in 1982, he was called up to the French team to face Italy in February 1982. That night, the Blues beat Italy for the first time in over sixty years, and Bravo scored their second goal.

He stayed at Nice for their spell in D2 for one season and managed to score eleven goals. He then signed for AS Monaco. This was the beginning of a series of clubs he would play for that would lead to him playing for Paris Saint Germain and then in Italy. With the France national team, Bravo played infrequently in the blue jersey, but still participated in the victorious Euro 1984, replacing Jean-Marc Ferreri, during the match against Yugoslavia.

Whilst at Marseille he played in the 1999 UEFA Cup Final.

== Personal life ==
He is married to singer Eva Bravo, and the actor and model Lucas Bravo is their son.

== Honours ==
Monaco

- Coupe de France: 1984–85

Paris Saint-Germain

- Coupe de France: 1992–93, 1994–95
- Division 1: 1993–94
- Coupe de la Ligue: 1994–95
- UEFA Cup Winners' Cup: 1995–96

France

- UEFA European Championship: 1984
