= François Calderaro =

French footballer (born 1964)

Personal information
- Date of birth: 15 June 1964 (age 62)
- Place of birth: Reims
- Height: 1.76 m (5 ft 9 in)
- Position: Forward

Senior career*
Years	Team	Apps	(Gls)
1981–1990	Stade de Reims		
1990–1992	FC Metz		
1992–1994	Paris Saint-Germain F.C.		
1994–1997	Toulouse FC		
- * Club domestic league appearances and goals

François Calderaro (born 15 June 1964) is a retired French football striker. Whilst at PSG he played as a substitute as they won the 1993 Coupe de France Final against FC Nantes.
