= 1993–94 French Division 1 =

56th season of French Division 1

Division 1
- Season: 1993–94
- Dates: 23 July 1993 – 21 May 1994
- Champions: Paris Saint-Germain (2nd title)
- Relegated: Marseille; Toulouse; Angers
- Champions League: Paris Saint-Germain
- Cup Winners' Cup: Auxerre
- UEFA Cup: Marseille; Bordeaux; Nantes; Cannes
- Matches: 380
- Goals: 850 (2.24 per match)
- Best Player: David Ginola
- Top goalscorer: Youri Djorkaeff; Roger Boli; Nicolas Ouédec (20 goals)

The 1993–94 Division 1 season was the 56th since its establishment. Paris Saint-Germain became champions for the second time in their history with 59 points.

This was the final season in which two points were awarded for a win; going forward this changed to three points.

== Promotion and relegation ==
Location of teams in 1993–94 Division 1

Teams promoted from 1992–93 Division 2

- Champions: Martigues
- Runners-up: Angers
- Play-offs: Cannes

Teams relegated to 1993–94 Division 2

- 18th place: Valenciennes
- 19th place: Toulon
- 20th place: Nîmes

== League table ==
Pos	Team	Pld	W	D	L	GF	GA	GD	Pts	Qualification or relegation
1	Paris Saint-Germain (C)	38	24	11	3	54	22	+32	59	Qualification to Champions League qualifying round
2	Marseille (Note: Olympique de Marseille was administratively relegated to 1994–95 Division 2, forced to relinquish their 1992–93 Division 1 title, and lost their right to play in the 1993–94 UEFA Champions League, the 1993 European Super Cup and the 1993 Intercontinental Cup, due to the Valenciennes FC-OM match fixing scandal. Despite being relegated, OM kept the right to play in the 1994–95 UEFA Cup.) (R)	38	19	13	6	56	33	+23	51	Qualification to UEFA Cup first round but summarily relegated to French Division 2
3	Auxerre (Note: Winner of the 1993–94 Coupe de France competition will qualify for the First round of the 1994–95 UEFA Cup Winners' Cup.)	38	18	10	10	54	29	+25	46	Qualification to Cup Winners' Cup first round
4	Bordeaux	38	19	8	11	54	37	+17	46	Qualification to UEFA Cup first round
5	Nantes	38	17	11	10	47	32	+15	45	Qualification to UEFA Cup first round
6	Cannes	38	16	12	10	50	43	+7	44	Qualification to UEFA Cup first round
7	Montpellier	38	15	13	10	41	37	+4	43	
8	Lyon	38	17	8	13	38	40	−2	42	
9	Monaco	38	14	13	11	52	36	+16	41	
10	Lens	38	13	13	12	49	40	+9	39	
11	Saint-Étienne	38	12	13	13	38	36	+2	37	
12	Metz	38	12	13	13	36	35	+1	37	
13	Strasbourg	38	10	14	14	43	47	−4	34	
14	Sochaux	38	10	13	15	39	48	−9	33	
15	Lille	38	8	16	14	41	52	−11	32	
16	Caen	38	12	7	19	29	54	−25	31	
17	Le Havre	38	7	15	16	29	48	−19	29	
18	Martigues	38	5	17	16	37	58	−21	27	
19	Toulouse (R)	38	4	15	19	26	60	−34	23	Relegation to French Division 2
20	Angers (R)	38	4	13	21	37	63	−26	21	Relegation to French Division 2

Source: Ligue 1
Rules for classification: 1) points; 2) goal difference; 3) number of goals scored.
A win is worth 2 points, with 1 point for a draw and 0 for a loss.
(C) Champions; (R) Relegated

== Results ==
Home \ Away	ANG	AUX	BOR	CAE	CAN	LHA	RCL	LIL	OL	OM	MAR	MET	ASM	MHS	FCN	PSG	STE	SOC	RCS	TFC
Angers		2–2	1–3	2–0	1–1	0–0	1–2	1–2	3–1	0–1	1–3	1–2	1–1	2–3	0–0	1–1	1–1	1–2	1–3	0–0
Auxerre	0–0		0–1	1–0	0–0	3–0	1–0	5–0	3–2	2–2	3–0	2–0	4–0	3–1	3–1	0–0	3–0	1–0	2–1	5–1
Bordeaux	1–0	2–0		3–0	0–0	2–1	4–2	2–1	2–0	1–0	1–1	2–0	1–0	1–1	2–0	1–0	1–2	4–1	2–0	2–0
Caen	2–3	1–0	1–0		1–1	1–1	1–0	2–3	1–0	1–0	4–1	1–1	0–1	0–0	0–0	0–2	1–0	2–1	3–1	1–0
Cannes	4–3	2–1	2–1	3–0		1–0	3–1	2–1	1–0	2–1	2–1	2–0	0–2	2–0	4–0	0–1	0–0	1–1	1–1	2–1
Le Havre	2–1	1–0	0–3	1–2	3–1		1–1	1–0	0–1	1–3	2–0	0–1	1–0	0–0	0–0	0–2	0–0	0–0	0–1	1–1
Lens	0–1	1–1	1–0	2–0	2–1	5–1		1–1	2–0	2–3	1–1	2–0	3–3	2–1	1–1	1–2	3–1	2–0	0–0	4–0
Lille	1–1	1–1	1–1	3–1	1–0	2–2	0–0		2–1	1–2	1–1	0–4	1–1	0–0	0–0	0–2	0–2	3–1	1–1	3–0
Lyon	1–1	1–0	4–2	2–0	2–2	1–1	1–2	0–0		1–0	0–0	2–0	1–0	3–2	2–1	1–3	1–0	1–0	2–1	1–0
Marseille	2–1	0–3	3–1	2–0	3–1	1–1	1–0	3–2	3–0		0–0	0–3	2–1	1–1	3–1	1–0	3–1	1–1	2–1	5–1
Martigues	0–0	0–1	0–0	4–1	4–0	3–0	1–2	2–2	0–1	0–3		1–1	1–3	1–1	1–2	1–1	2–1	1–1	0–3	1–1
Metz	2–0	0–0	1–0	2–1	0–0	2–0	2–1	1–1	0–1	0–0	0–0		1–1	1–1	2–0	0–1	0–1	1–1	2–1	1–0
Monaco	3–0	0–1	3–2	3–0	2–0	1–1	0–0	1–0	1–1	0–0	7–0	1–1		1–2	1–0	1–1	1–1	2–0	2–1	3–0
Montpellier	2–1	1–0	1–0	0–0	2–1	2–1	0–0	1–3	1–1	0–2	1–0	3–2	0–3		1–0	0–0	3–0	1–0	4–0	3–1
Nantes	2–1	1–2	4–1	1–0	0–0	3–1	2–1	2–0	1–0	0–0	2–1	2–0	1–0	0–0		3–0	1–0	2–0	2–2	4–0
Paris SG	3–0	4–0	4–1	2–0	2–1	0–0	1–0	2–1	0–0	1–1	2–2	1–0	1–1	1–0	1–0		1–0	1–0	2–0	1–0
Saint-Étienne	2–0	1–0	0–0	5–0	1–2	0–0	0–0	2–1	3–0	0–0	1–1	1–0	2–0	2–0	1–1	1–2		0–0	0–0	2–2
Sochaux	4–1	1–0	2–2	0–0	1–1	4–2	1–1	1–0	0–1	1–1	1–0	2–1	2–0	2–1	1–1	1–2	3–2		1–3	0–0
Strasbourg	2–2	1–1	0–2	3–0	2–2	0–3	2–0	1–1	0–1	1–1	3–0	0–0	1–1	0–1	0–3	2–2	2–0	2–0		1–0
Toulouse	2–1	0–0	0–0	0–1	1–2	0–0	1–1	1–1	2–0	0–0	2–2	2–2	2–1	0–0	0–3	1–2	1–2	3–2	0–0	

Source: Ligue 1
Legend: Blue = home team win; Yellow = draw; Red = away team win.

== Top goalscorers ==
Rank	Player	Club	Goals
1	(France) Roger Boli	Lens	20
1	(France) Youri Djorkaeff	Monaco	20
1	(France) Nicolas Ouédec	Nantes	20
4	(France) Franck Priou	Cannes	18
5	(Brazil) Sonny Anderson	Marseille	16
6	(France) Alain Caveglia	Sochaux	15
7	(France) David Ginola	Paris Saint-Germain	13
7	(France) David Zitelli	Metz	13
7	(France) Didier Tholot	Martigues	13
10	(France) Christophe Lagrange	Angers	12
10	(France) Christophe Cocard	Auxerre	12
10	(Germany) Roland Wohlfarth	Saint-Étienne	12
10	(Netherlands) Henk Vos	Sochaux	12

== Attendances ==
#	Club	Average
1	PSG	28,370
2	Marseille	25,320
3	Lens	20,334
4	Strasbourg	18,039
5	Girondins	17,844
6	Nantes	17,612
7	Caen	16,226
8	Olympique lyonnais	15,971
9	Saint-Étienne	15,020
10	MHSC	9,810
11	AJA	9,737
12	Metz	9,291
13	Le Havre	7,691
14	Toulouse	7,579
15	LOSC	6,732
16	Angers	5,895
17	Monaco	5,864
18	Sochaux	5,586
19	Cannes	4,623
20	Martigues	3,569
