= 1986–87 Paris Saint-Germain FC season =

17th season of Paris Saint-Germain

Paris Saint-Germain
1986–87 season
- President: Francis Borelli
- Manager: Gérard Houllier
- Stadium: Parc des Princes
- Ligue 1: 7th
- Coupe de France: Round of 32
- UEFA Champions League: First round
- Top goalscorer: League: Vahid Halilhodžić (8); All: Vahid Halilhodžić (9)
- Average home league attendance: 20,312
Home colours	Away colours	Third colours

The 1986–87 season was the 17th season in the history of Paris Saint-Germain FC. PSG played their home league matches at the Parc des Princes, attracting an average of 20,312 spectators per match. The club's president was Francis Borelli, and the team was managed by Gérard Houllier, with Jean-Marc Pilorget serving as captain. PSG finished seventh in Ligue 1, reached the round of 32 in the Coupe de France, and the first round of the UEFA Champions League. Vahid Halilhodžić was the team's top scorer, netting 9 goals in all competitions, including 8 in the league.

== Players ==
=== Squad ===
Players who featured in at least one official match for the club.

Note: Flags indicate national team as defined under FIFA eligibility rules; some limited exceptions apply. Players may hold more than one non-FIFA nationality.

No.	Pos.	Nation	Player
—	GK	FRA	Claude Barrabé
—	GK	FRA	Joël Bats
—	GK	FRA	Jean-Michel Moutier
—	DF	FRA	Thierry Rabat
—	DF	FRA	Michel Bibard
—	DF	FRA	Jean-Luc Vasseur
—	DF	FRA	Jean-Marc Pilorget (captain)
—	DF	FRA	Philippe Jeannol
—	DF	FRA	William Ayache
—	DF	FRA	Franck Tanasi
—	DF	FRA	Thierry Bacconnier
—	DF	FRA	Claude Lowitz
—	DF	FRA	Fabrice Poullain
—	DF	FRA	Olivier Martinez
—	MF	FRA	Pierre Reynaud

No.	Pos.	Nation	Player
—	MF	FRA	Éric Martin
—	MF	FRA	Alain Polaniok
—	MF	CMR	Fabrice Moreau
—	MF	SEN	Oumar Sène
—	MF	FRA	Patrice Marquet
—	MF	YUG	Safet Sušić
—	FW	NED	Pierre Vermeulen
—	FW	ALG	Lyazid Sandjak
—	FW	YUG	Vahid Halilhodžić
—	FW	FRA	Amara Simba
—	FW	FRA	Alain Couriol
—	FW	FRA	Dominique Rocheteau
—	FW	FRA	Daniel Xuereb
—	FW	SEN	Jules Bocandé

=== Out on loan ===
Players who were loaned out to other clubs during the season.

Note: Flags indicate national team as defined under FIFA eligibility rules; some limited exceptions apply. Players may hold more than one non-FIFA nationality.

No.	Pos.	Nation	Player
—	DF	FRA	Jean-François Charbonnier (at Cannes)

== Transfers ==
=== Arrivals ===
Players who signed for the club.

Note: Flags indicate national team as defined under FIFA eligibility rules; some limited exceptions apply. Players may hold more than one non-FIFA nationality.

No.	Pos.	Nation	Player
—	GK	FRA	Claude Barrabé (from PSG Youth Academy)
—	DF	FRA	William Ayache (from Nantes)
—	DF	FRA	Thierry Rabat (from Limoges)
—	DF	FRA	Jean-Luc Vasseur (from PSG Youth Academy)
—	MF	FRA	Alain Polaniok (from Racing CF)
—	MF	FRA	Pierre Reynaud (from PSG Youth Academy)
—	MF	FRA	Éric Martin (from Nancy)
—	FW	SEN	Jules Bocandé (from Metz)

No.	Pos.	Nation	Player
—	FW	YUG	Vahid Halilhodžić (from Nantes)
—	FW	AUT	Richard Niederbacher (from Reims, end of loan)
—	FW	FRA	Laurent Pimond (from Red Star, end of loan)
—	FW	ALG	Lyazid Sandjak (from PSG Youth Academy)
—	FW	FRA	Amara Simba (from PSG Youth Academy)
—	FW	FRA	Franck Vandecasteele (from Alès, end of loan)
—	FW	FRA	Daniel Xuereb (from Lens)

=== Departures ===
Players who left the club.

Note: Flags indicate national team as defined under FIFA eligibility rules; some limited exceptions apply. Players may hold more than one non-FIFA nationality.

No.	Pos.	Nation	Player
—	DF	FRA	Thierry Morin (to Red Star)
—	MF	FRA	Luis Fernandez (to Racing CF)
—	MF	FRA	Jean-Luc Girard (to Red Star)
—	MF	FRA	Jean-Claude Lemoult (to Montpellier)

No.	Pos.	Nation	Player
—	FW	ARG	Omar da Fonseca (to Monaco)
—	FW	FRA	Robert Jacques (to Saint-Étienne)
—	FW	AUT	Richard Niederbacher (to Rapid Wien)
—	FW	FRA	Laurent Pimond (to Versailles)

== Kits ==
RTL and Canal+ were the shirt sponsors, and Adidas was the kit supplier.

Home	Away	Third

== Competitions ==
=== Overview ===
Competition	First match	Last match	Starting round	Final position	Record							
Competition	First match	Last match	Starting round	Final position	Pld	W	D	L	GF	GA	GD	Win %
Ligue 1	5 August 1986	5 June 1987	Matchday 1	7th	38	14	13	11	35	33	+2	36.84
Coupe de France	21 March 1987	7 April 1987	Round of 64	Round of 32	3	1	1	1	2	1	+1	33.33
UEFA Champions League	17 September 1986	30 September 1986	First round	First round	2	0	1	1	2	3	−1	0.00
Total					43	15	15	13	39	37	+2	34.88

Source: Competitions

=== Ligue 1 ===
==== League table ====
Pos	Team	Pld	W	D	L	GF	GA	GD	Pts
5	Monaco	38	15	15	8	41	33	+8	45
6	Metz	38	14	15	9	54	32	+22	43
7	Paris Saint-Germain	38	14	13	11	35	33	+2	41
8	Brest	38	14	12	12	43	41	+2	40
9	Laval	38	12	14	12	40	46	−6	38

Source: Histoire du PSG
Rules for classification: 1) points; 2) goal difference; 3) number of goals scored.
Victory: 2 points, Draw: 1 point, Defeat: 0 points

==== Results by round ====
Round	1	2	3	4	5	6	7	8	9	10	11	12	13	14	15	16	17	18	19	20	21	22	23	24	25	26	27	28	29	30	31	32	33	34	35	36	37	38
Ground	H	A	H	A	H	A	H	A	H	A	H	A	H	A	H	H	A	H	A	H	A	H	A	H	A	H	A	H	A	H	A	H	A	A	H	A	H	A
Result	W	W	D	L	W	W	D	D	L	W	W	L	D	W	D	L	L	L	L	W	D	W	D	L	L	D	W	W	D	D	L	W	D	D	W	D	W	L
Position	3	1	4	7	5	3	4	3	4	3	3	3	3	3	3	5	6	9	11	9	10	7	7	10	11	11	9	8	7	7	9	7	7	7	6	7	7	7

Source: Histoire du PSG
A = Away; H = Home; W = Win; D = Draw; L = Loss

==== Matches ====
5 August 1986 1	Paris Saint-Germain	1–0	Laval	Paris
	Jeannol 85'	Report		Stadium: Parc des Princes; Attendance: 24,342; Referee: Michel De Zayas

8 August 1986 2	Auxerre	1–2	Paris Saint-Germain	Auxerre
	Barret 20'	Report 1 Report 2	Halilhodžić 22'; Bocandé 49'	Stadium: Stade de l'Abbé-Deschamps; Attendance: 10,600; Referee: Gérard Biguet

12 August 1986 3	Paris Saint-Germain	0–0	Metz	Paris
		Report		Stadium: Parc des Princes; Attendance: 24,525; Referee: Alain Delmer

15 August 1986 4	Saint-Étienne	1–0	Paris Saint-Germain	Saint-Étienne
	Dimitrov 5'	Report		Stadium: Stade Geoffroy-Guichard; Attendance: 26,906; Referee: Mohamed Benali

22 August 1986 5	Paris Saint-Germain	1–0	Brest	Paris
	Halilhodžić 8'	Report		Stadium: Parc des Princes; Attendance: 29,747; Referee: Jacques Ferrary

26 August 1986 6	Nice	0–2	Paris Saint-Germain	Nice
		Report	Xuereb 73'; Halilhodžić 85'	Stadium: Stade du Ray; Attendance: 16,049; Referee: Michel Vautrot

29 August 1986 7	Paris Saint-Germain	1–1	Lille	Paris
	Halilhodžić 28' (pen.)	Report	Desmet 69'	Stadium: Parc des Princes; Attendance: 20,908; Referee: Jean-Claude Hirtz

3 September 1986 8	Toulon	1–1	Paris Saint-Germain	Toulon
	Ramos 5'	Report	Sène 16'	Stadium: Stade Mayol; Attendance: 9,000; Referee: Alain Delmer

13 September 1986 9	Paris Saint-Germain	1–2	Racing CF	Paris
	Rocheteau 50'	Report	Francescoli 41', 86'	Stadium: Parc des Princes; Attendance: 32,254; Referee: Claude Bouillet

20 September 1986 10	Nantes	0–1	Paris Saint-Germain	Nantes
		Report	Xuereb 64'	Stadium: Stade de la Beaujoire; Attendance: 17,058; Referee: Jean-Claude Swirog

24 September 1986 11	Paris Saint-Germain	1–0	Rennes	Paris
	Jeannol 58'	Report		Stadium: Parc des Princes; Attendance: 12,627; Referee: Robert Wurtz

4 October 1986 12	Bordeaux	2–0	Paris Saint-Germain	Bordeaux
	Vercruysse 77'; Vujović 89'	Report		Stadium: Stade Chaban-Delmas; Attendance: 21,443; Referee: Claude Bouillet

17 October 1986 13	Paris Saint-Germain	1–1	Le Havre	Paris
	Halilhodžić 45' (pen.)	Report	Llorens 11' (pen.)	Stadium: Parc des Princes; Attendance: 11,143; Referee: Michel Vautrot

25 October 1986 14	Sochaux	0–1	Paris Saint-Germain	Montbéliard
		Report	Bocandé 35'	Stadium: Stade Auguste-Bonal; Attendance: 9,000; Referee: Michel De Zayas

31 October 1986 15	Paris Saint-Germain	0–0	Nancy	Paris
		Report		Stadium: Parc des Princes; Attendance: 11,399; Referee: Rémi Harrel

8 November 1986 16	Paris Saint-Germain	2–3	Toulouse	Paris
	Halilhodžić 38', 59'	Report	Stopyra 4'; Passi 45'; Durand 52'	Stadium: Parc des Princes; Attendance: 20,863; Referee: Antoine de Pandis

12 November 1986 17	Lens	1–0	Paris Saint-Germain	Lens
	Dewilder 47'	Report		Stadium: Stade Bollaert-Delelis; Attendance: 9,153; Referee: Gérard Biguet

22 November 1986 18	Paris Saint-Germain	0–1	Monaco	Paris
		Report	Bijotat 1'	Stadium: Parc des Princes; Attendance: 20,269; Referee: Mohamed Benali

28 November 1986 19	Marseille	4–0	Paris Saint-Germain	Marseille
	Laurey 11'; Cubaynes 38', 70'; Papin 79'	Report		Stadium: Stade Vélodrome; Attendance: 38,209; Referee: René Lopez

5 December 1986 20	Paris Saint-Germain	1–0	Auxerre	Paris
	Vermeulen 31'	Report		Stadium: Parc des Princes; Attendance: 13,791; Referee: Michel Girard

14 December 1986 21	Metz	0–0	Paris Saint-Germain	Metz
		Report		Stadium: Stade Saint-Symphorien; Attendance: 15,184; Referee: Jean-Louis Rideau

17 December 1986 22	Paris Saint-Germain	3–0	Saint-Étienne	Paris
	Bocandé 19'; Bacconnier 21'; Rocheteau 77'	Report		Stadium: Parc des Princes; Attendance: 26,093; Referee: Michel Vautrot

20 December 1986 23	Brest	0–0	Paris Saint-Germain	Brest
		Report		Stadium: Stade Francis-Le Blé; Attendance: 11,422; Referee: Jean-Pierre Blouet

28 February 1987 24	Paris Saint-Germain	0–3	Nice	Paris
		Report	Morales 50'; Rico 51'; Pascal 85'	Stadium: Parc des Princes; Attendance: 17,078; Referee: Michel De Zayas

7 March 1987 25	Lille	1–0	Paris Saint-Germain	Lille
	Vandenbergh 66'	Report		Stadium: Stade Grimonprez-Jooris; Attendance: 12,107; Referee: Robert Wurtz

11 March 1987 26	Paris Saint-Germain	1–1	Toulon	Paris
	Bocandé 40'	Report	Casoni 34'	Stadium: Parc des Princes; Attendance: 9,278; Referee: Jean-Marie Sculfort

14 March 1987 27	Racing CF	0–1	Paris Saint-Germain	Paris
		Report 1 Report 2	Fernandez 59' (o.g.)	Stadium: Parc des Princes; Attendance: 29,096; Referee: Gérard Biguet

25 March 1987 28	Paris Saint-Germain	2–1	Nantes	Paris
	Sušić 5'; Halilhodžić 78' (pen.)	Report	Kombouaré 67'	Stadium: Parc des Princes; Attendance: 17,184; Referee: Jean-Louis Rideau

28 March 1987 29	Rennes	0–0	Paris Saint-Germain	Rennes
		Report		Stadium: Roazhon Park; Attendance: 4,068; Referee: Jean-Claude Bourgeois

4 April 1987 30	Paris Saint-Germain	0–0	Bordeaux	Paris
		Report		Stadium: Parc des Princes; Attendance: 32,326; Referee: Alain Delmer

11 April 1987 31	Le Havre	2–0	Paris Saint-Germain	Le Havre
	Pain 20'; Vízek 90' (pen.)	Report		Stadium: Stade Jules Deschaseaux; Attendance: 11,911; Referee: Michel Girard

17 April 1987 32	Paris Saint-Germain	2–0	Sochaux	Paris
	Sandjak 37'; Bocandé 84'	Report		Stadium: Parc des Princes; Attendance: 9,105; Referee: Jean-Pierre Blouet

1 May 1987 33	Nancy	0–0	Paris Saint-Germain	Tomblaine
		Report		Stadium: Stade Marcel Picot; Attendance: 8,186; Referee: Alain Delmer

9 May 1987 34	Toulouse	1–1	Paris Saint-Germain	Toulouse
	Stopyra 78'	Report	Rocheteau 60'	Stadium: Stadium de Toulouse; Attendance: 18,526; Referee: Michel De Zayas

15 May 1987 35	Paris Saint-Germain	3–1	Lens	Paris
	Couriol 67'; Polaniok 84'; Sandjak 88'	Report	Krawczyk 81' (pen.)	Stadium: Parc des Princes; Attendance: 19,897; Referee: Robert Wurtz

22 May 1987 36	Monaco	1–1	Paris Saint-Germain	Monaco
	Bijotat 34'	Report	Sušić 1'	Stadium: Stade Louis II; Attendance: 4,613; Referee: Jean-Claude Swirog

29 May 1987 37	Paris Saint-Germain	2–0	Marseille	Paris
	Sène 82'; Sušić 90'	Report		Stadium: Parc des Princes; Attendance: 33,090; Referee: Alain Delmer

5 June 1987 38	Laval	4–3	Paris Saint-Germain	Laval
	Owubokiri 28', 52'; Delamontagne 31'; Paillard 82'	Report	Sandjak 29', 80'; Couriol 47'	Stadium: Stade Francis Le Basser; Attendance: 5,099; Referee: Jean-Louis Rideau

=== Coupe de France ===
==== Round of 64 ====
21 March 1987 Single leg	Paris Saint-Germain	2–0	Nancy	Épinal
	Sène 64'; Rabat 73'	Report		Stadium: Stade de la Colombière; Attendance: 8,000; Referee: Jean-Claude Hirtz

==== Round of 32 ====
1 April 1987 First leg	Paris Saint-Germain	0–0	Strasbourg	Paris
		Report		Stadium: Parc des Princes; Attendance: 5,000; Referee: Jean-Claude Swirog

7 April 1987 Second leg	Strasbourg	1–0 (1–0 agg.)	Paris Saint-Germain	Strasbourg
	Barraja 70'	Report		Stadium: Stade de la Meinau; Attendance: 16,000; Referee: Antoine de Pandis

=== UEFA Champions League ===
==== First round ====
17 September 1986 First leg	Paris Saint-Germain (France)	2–2	(Czech Republic) Vítkovice	Paris, France
20:30	Halilhodžić 18'; Pilorget 57' (pen.)	Report	Kovačík 8'; Šourek 22'	Stadium: Parc des Princes; Attendance: 16,800; Referee: Victoriano Sánchez Arminio (Spain)

30 September 1986 Second leg	Vítkovice (Czech Republic)	1–0 (3–2 agg.)	(France) Paris Saint-Germain	Ostrava, Czech Republic
16:30	Šourek 68'	Report		Stadium: Městský stadion Attendance: 8,605; Referee: John Martin (England)

== Statistics ==
=== Appearances and goals ===
29 players featured in at least one official match, and the club scored 39 goals in official competitions, including one own goal.

Rank	Player	Position	Appearances	Goals	Source
1	(France) Fabrice Poullain	DF	42	0	
2	(France) Joël Bats	GK	37	0	
3	(Socialist Federal Republic of Yugoslavia) Safet Sušić	MF	33	3	
4	(France) Philippe Jeannol	DF	33	2	
5	(Senegal) Jules Bocandé	FW	31	5	
6	(France) Daniel Xuereb	FW	30	2	
7	(France) William Ayache	DF	30	0	
8	(France) Jean-Marc Pilorget	DF	29	1	
9	(France) Dominique Rocheteau	FW	26	3	
10	(France) Franck Tanasi	DF	24	0	
11	(Senegal) Oumar Sène	MF	23	2	
12	(Socialist Federal Republic of Yugoslavia) Vahid Halilhodžić	FW	22	9	
13	(France) Alain Couriol	FW	22	2	
14	(France) Thierry Rabat	DF	19	1	
15	(France) Michel Bibard	DF	19	0	
16	(Netherlands) Pierre Vermeulen	FW	17	1	
17	(France) Thierry Bacconnier	DF	16	1	
18	(France) Alain Polaniok	MF	16	1	
19	(France) Claude Lowitz	DF	15	0	
20	(France) Pierre Reynaud	MF	13	0	
21	(Algeria) Lyazid Sandjak	FW	9	4	
22	(France) Éric Martin	MF	8	0	
23	(France) Claude Barrabé	GK	6	0	
24	(France) Patrice Marquet	MF	6	0	
25	(France) Jean-Luc Vasseur	DF	4	0	
26	(France) Amara Simba	FW	3	0	
27	(France) Olivier Martinez	DF	1	0	
28	(Cameroon) Fabrice Moreau	MF	1	0	
29	(France) Jean-Michel Moutier	GK	1	0	
