= 1990–91 Paris Saint-Germain FC season =

21st season of Paris Saint-Germain

Paris Saint-Germain
1990–91 season
- President: Francis Borelli
- Manager: Henri Michel
- Stadium: Parc des Princes
- Ligue 1: 9th
- Coupe de France: Round of 16
- Top goalscorer: League: Safet Sušić (10); Zlatko Vujović (10); All: Safet Sušić (11); Zlatko Vujović (11)
- Average home league attendance: 14,817
Home colours	Away colours

The 1990–91 season was the 21st season in the history of Paris Saint-Germain FC. PSG played their home league matches at the Parc des Princes, attracting an average of 14,817 spectators per match. The club's president was Francis Borelli, and the team was managed by Henri Michel, with Safet Sušić serving as captain. PSG finished ninth in Ligue 1 and reached the round of 16 in the Coupe de France. Safet Sušić and Zlatko Vujović were the team's joint top scorers, each netting 11 goals in all competitions, including 10 in the league.

== Players ==
=== Squad ===
Players who featured in at least one official match for the club.

Note: Flags indicate national team as defined under FIFA eligibility rules; some limited exceptions apply. Players may hold more than one non-FIFA nationality.

No.	Pos.	Nation	Player
—	GK	FRA	Joël Bats
—	GK	FRA	Thomas Kokkinis
—	DF	FRA	Jean-Pierre Bosser
—	DF	FRA	Michel Bibard
—	DF	FRA	Jean-Luc Vasseur
—	DF	FRA	Jean-François Charbonnier
—	DF	FRA	Stéphane Persol
—	DF	FRA	Philippe Jeannol
—	DF	FRA	Francis Llacer
—	DF	FRA	Franck Tanasi
—	DF	FRA	Jocelyn Angloma
—	DF	FRA	Antoine Kombouaré

No.	Pos.	Nation	Player
—	MF	FRA	Pierre Reynaud
—	MF	FRA	Daniel Bravo
—	MF	SEN	Oumar Sène
—	MF	YUG	Safet Sušić (captain)
—	MF	FRA	Thierry Laurey
—	FW	ALG	Lyazid Sandjak
—	FW	FRA	Pascal Nouma
—	FW	FRA	David Rinçon
—	FW	YUG	Zlatko Vujović
—	FW	FRA	Christian Perez
—	FW	SEN	Alboury Lah
—	FW	FRA	Amara Simba

=== Out on loan ===
Players who were loaned out to other clubs during the season.

Note: Flags indicate national team as defined under FIFA eligibility rules; some limited exceptions apply. Players may hold more than one non-FIFA nationality.

No.	Pos.	Nation	Player
—	GK	FRA	Thomas Kokkinis (at Bastia)
—	MF	FRA	Thierry Laurey (at Saint-Étienne)

No.	Pos.	Nation	Player
—	FW	FRA	Amara Simba (at Cannes)

== Transfers ==
=== Arrivals ===
Players who signed for the club.

Note: Flags indicate national team as defined under FIFA eligibility rules; some limited exceptions apply. Players may hold more than one non-FIFA nationality.

No.	Pos.	Nation	Player
—	GK	FRA	Claude Barrabé (from Brest, end of loan)
—	GK	FRA	Thomas Kokkinis (from PSG Youth Academy)
—	DF	FRA	Jocelyn Angloma (from Lille)
—	DF	FRA	Antoine Kombouaré (from Nantes)

No.	Pos.	Nation	Player
—	DF	FRA	Christian Zajaczkowski (from Abbeville, end of loan)
—	MF	FRA	Thierry Laurey (from Sochaux)
—	FW	SEN	Alboury Lah (from Guingamp, end of loan)
—	FW	FRA	Franck Vandecasteele (from Abbeville, end of loan)

=== Departures ===
Players who left the club.

Note: Flags indicate national team as defined under FIFA eligibility rules; some limited exceptions apply. Players may hold more than one non-FIFA nationality.

No.	Pos.	Nation	Player
—	GK	FRA	Claude Barrabé (to Montpellier)
—	GK	FRA	Michel Bensoussan (Retired)
—	DF	FRA	Thierry Rabat (to Toulon)
—	DF	FRA	Yvon Le Roux (Retired)

No.	Pos.	Nation	Player
—	DF	FRA	Christian Zajaczkowski (to Montferrand)
—	MF	ARG	Gabriel Calderón (to Sion)
—	MF	FRA	Didier Rabat (to Pau)

== Kits ==
RTL and Alain Afflelou were the shirt sponsors, and Nike was the kit supplier.

Home	Away

== Competitions ==
=== Overview ===
Competition	First match	Last match	Starting round	Final position	Record							
Competition	First match	Last match	Starting round	Final position	Pld	W	D	L	GF	GA	GD	Win %
Ligue 1	21 July 1990	24 May 1991	Matchday 1	9th	38	13	12	13	40	42	−2	34.21
Coupe de France	9 March 1991	28 April 1991	Round of 64	Round of 16	3	2	0	1	2	2	+0	66.67
Total					41	15	12	14	42	44	−2	36.59

Source: Competitions

=== Ligue 1 ===
==== League table ====
Pos	Team	Pld	W	D	L	GF	GA	GD	Pts	Qualification or relegation
7	Montpellier	38	12	14	12	44	35	+9	38	
8	Caen	38	13	12	13	38	36	+2	38	
9	Paris Saint-Germain	38	13	12	13	40	42	−2	38	
10	Bordeaux (R)	38	11	15	12	34	32	+2	37	Administratively relegated to French Division 2 (Note: Bordeaux, Brest and Nice were administratively relegated to Division 2 due to financial difficulties.)
11	Brest (R)	38	11	15	12	45	46	−1	37	Administratively relegated to French Division 2

Source: Histoire du PSG
Rules for classification: 1) points; 2) goal difference; 3) number of goals scored.
Victory: 3 points, Draw: 1 point, Defeat: 0 points
(R) Relegated

==== Results by round ====
Round	1	2	3	4	5	6	7	8	9	10	11	12	13	14	15	16	17	18	19	20	21	22	23	24	25	26	27	28	29	30	31	32	33	34	35	36	37	38
Ground	H	A	H	A	H	A	H	A	H	A	H	A	H	A	H	A	H	H	A	H	A	H	A	H	A	H	A	H	A	H	A	H	A	H	A	A	H	A
Result	W	L	W	L	D	D	W	L	W	D	D	L	W	L	D	L	W	L	D	D	W	W	W	L	D	L	L	W	L	W	D	L	L	W	D	D	D	W
Position	3	8	3	10	10	6	6	9	8	6	6	12	6	11	9	11	9	11	8	12	13	11	9	9	10	10	12	7	9	8	9	11	11	11	12	12	12	9

Source: Histoire du PSG
A = Away; H = Home; W = Win; D = Draw; L = Loss

==== Matches ====
21 July 1990 1	Paris Saint-Germain	2–1	Nancy	Paris
	Sušić 79' (pen.); Vujović 90'	Report	Martin 53'	Stadium: Parc des Princes; Attendance: 18,165; Referee: Georges Ramos

28 July 1990 2	Rennes	2–1	Paris Saint-Germain	Rennes
	Omam-Biyik 7', 16'	Report	Bravo 85'	Stadium: Roazhon Park; Attendance: 16,499; Referee: Philippe Leduc

4 August 1990 3	Paris Saint-Germain	4–0	Toulon	Paris
	Bravo 39', 58'; Sušić 55' (pen.); Vujović 75'	Report		Stadium: Parc des Princes; Attendance: 11,577; Referee: Michel Girard

10 August 1990 4	Montpellier	4–0	Paris Saint-Germain	Montpellier
	Bosser 38' (o.g.); Baills 43'; Blanc 68', 73' (pen.)	Report		Stadium: Stade de la Mosson; Attendance: 15,040; Referee: Alain Delmer

18 August 1990 5	Paris Saint-Germain	1–1	Auxerre	Paris
	Bravo 19'	Report 1 Report 2	Scifo 2'	Stadium: Parc des Princes; Attendance: 17,919; Referee: Rémi Harrel

25 August 1990 6	Nice	1–1	Paris Saint-Germain	Nice
	Mège 26'	Report	Bravo 65'	Stadium: Stade du Ray; Attendance: 13,000; Referee: Claude Bouillet

29 August 1990 7	Paris Saint-Germain	3–0	Lyon	Paris
	Sušić 11' (pen.); Vujović 74'; Angloma 84'	Report 1 Report 2		Stadium: Parc des Princes; Attendance: 15,198; Referee: Antoine de Pandis

8 September 1990 8	Marseille	2–1	Paris Saint-Germain	Marseille
	Waddle 11'; Cantona 18'	Report	Mozer 16' (o.g.)	Stadium: Stade Vélodrome; Attendance: 31,626; Referee: Michel Vautrot

15 September 1990 9	Paris Saint-Germain	3–2	Caen	Paris
	Vujović 6'; Angloma 39'; Sušić 52'	Report	Fournier 34'; Divert 88' (pen.)	Stadium: Parc des Princes; Attendance: 23,341; Referee: Germain Zagni

22 September 1990 10	Metz	2–2	Paris Saint-Germain	Metz
	Asanović 13', 63' (pen.)	Report	Angloma 44'; Bravo 48'	Stadium: Stade Saint-Symphorien; Attendance: 11,984; Referee: Jean-Pierre Blouet

29 September 1990 11	Paris Saint-Germain	1–1	Nantes	Paris
	Angloma 71'	Report	Robert 2'	Stadium: Parc des Princes; Attendance: 20,871; Referee: Michel De Zayas

6 October 1990 12	Bordeaux	3–0	Paris Saint-Germain	Bordeaux
	Ferreri 47' (pen.); Dugarry 50'; Deschamps 79'	Report		Stadium: Stade Chaban-Delmas; Attendance: 18,002; Referee: Antoine de Pandis

20 October 1990 13	Paris Saint-Germain	2–0	Lille	Paris
	Sušić 1', 62'	Report		Stadium: Parc des Princes; Attendance: 10,639; Referee: Jean-Claude Bourgeois

28 October 1990 14	Monaco	2–0	Paris Saint-Germain	Monaco
	Díaz 35' (pen.), 59'	Report		Stadium: Stade Louis II; Attendance: 3,500; Referee: Alain Delmer

3 November 1990 15	Paris Saint-Germain	0–0	Cannes	Paris
		Report		Stadium: Parc des Princes; Attendance: 10,526; Referee: Gérard Biguet

10 November 1990 16	Toulouse	2–1	Paris Saint-Germain	Toulouse
	Márcico 5'; Bastère 74'	Report	Sušić 89'	Stadium: Stadium de Toulouse; Attendance: 6,500; Referee: Jean-Louis Rideau

24 November 1990 17	Paris Saint-Germain	4–2	Saint-Étienne	Paris
	Vujović 3', 43'; Bravo 26'; Sušić 52'	Report	Deguerville 70'; Witschge 88'	Stadium: Parc des Princes; Attendance: 21,141; Referee: Claude Bouillet

2 December 1990 18	Paris Saint-Germain	0–2	Sochaux	Paris
		Report	Priou 16'; Baždarević 75'	Stadium: Parc des Princes; Attendance: 9,523; Referee: Michel De Zayas

16 December 1990 20	Paris Saint-Germain	1–1	Rennes	Paris
	Perez 73'	Report 1	Delamontagne 32'	Stadium: Parc des Princes; Attendance: 8,778; Referee: Patrick Anton

22 December 1990 21	Toulon	0–0; Awarded	Paris Saint-Germain	Toulon
		Report		Stadium: Stade Mayol; Attendance: 3,500; Referee: Claude Bouillet

13 January 1991 22	Paris Saint-Germain	2–0	Montpellier	Paris
	Sušić 56'; Angloma 85'	Report 1 Report 2		Stadium: Parc des Princes; Attendance: 15,758; Referee: Jean-Marie Lartigot

20 January 1991 23	Auxerre	0–1	Paris Saint-Germain	Auxerre
		Report	Vujović 37'	Stadium: Stade de l'Abbé-Deschamps; Attendance: 7,000; Referee: Michel Girard

23 January 1991 19	Brest	0–0	Paris Saint-Germain	Brest
				Stadium: Stade Francis-Le Blé; Attendance: 6,591; Referee: Marc Batta

27 January 1991 24	Paris Saint-Germain	0–2	Nice	Paris
		Report	Mège 52'; Langers 86'	Stadium: Parc des Princes; Attendance: 6,000; Referee: Marcel Lainé

3 February 1991 25	Lyon	0–0	Paris Saint-Germain	Lyon
		Report		Stadium: Stade de Gerland; Attendance: 19,529; Referee: Jean-Claude Swirog

10 February 1991 26	Paris Saint-Germain	0–1	Marseille	Paris
		Report	Boli 71'	Stadium: Parc des Princes; Attendance: 38,766; Referee: Jean-Marie Lartigot

13 February 1991 27	Caen	2–0	Paris Saint-Germain	Caen
	Germain 20'; Divert 51'	Report		Stadium: Stade de Venoix; Attendance: 6,695; Referee: Gilles Veissière

24 February 1991 28	Paris Saint-Germain	2–1	Metz	Paris
	Angloma 18'; Perez 41'		Huysman 80'	Stadium: Parc des Princes; Attendance: 7,374; Referee: Marc Batta

2 March 1991 29	Nantes	2–0	Paris Saint-Germain	Nantes
	Jakovljević 41'; Youm 89'	Report		Stadium: Stade de la Beaujoire; Attendance: 9,426; Referee: Patrick Anton

16 March 1991 30	Paris Saint-Germain	1–0	Bordeaux	Paris
	Sušić 20' (pen.)			Stadium: Parc des Princes; Attendance: 14,000; Referee: Georges Ramos

23 March 1991 31	Lille	0–0	Paris Saint-Germain	Lille
		Report		Stadium: Stade Grimonprez-Jooris; Attendance: 6,473; Referee: Claude Colombo

6 April 1991 32	Paris Saint-Germain	0–2	Monaco	Paris
		Report	Weah 6'; Fofana 55'	Stadium: Parc des Princes; Attendance: 15,826; Referee: Claude Bouillet

13 April 1991 33	Cannes	2–0	Paris Saint-Germain	Cannes
	Bray 17'; Simba 82'	Report		Stadium: Stade Pierre de Coubertin; Attendance: 6,000; Referee: Germain Zagni

20 April 1991 34	Paris Saint-Germain	3–0	Toulouse	Paris
	Vujović 20'; Bravo 33'; Llacer 82'	Report		Stadium: Parc des Princes; Attendance: 7,154; Referee: Jean-Pierre Blouet

4 May 1991 35	Saint-Étienne	1–1	Paris Saint-Germain	Saint-Étienne
	Corroyer 68'	Report	Sandjak 52'	Stadium: Stade Geoffroy-Guichard; Attendance: 11,610; Referee: Claude Bouillet

10 May 1991 36	Sochaux	0–0	Paris Saint-Germain	Montbéliard
				Stadium: Stade Auguste-Bonal; Attendance: 4,486; Referee: Gilles Veissière

17 May 1991 37	Paris Saint-Germain	1–1	Brest	Paris
	Milojević 50' (o.g.)	Report	Ferrer 71'	Stadium: Parc des Princes; Attendance: 6,000; Referee: Michel Vautrot

24 May 1991 38	Nancy	0–2	Paris Saint-Germain	Tomblaine
			Vujović 51', 65'	Stadium: Stade Marcel Picot; Attendance: 15,799; Referee: Rémy Harrel

=== Coupe de France ===
9 March 1991 Round of 64	Wasquehal	0–1	Paris Saint-Germain	Wasquehal
		Report	Sušić 79' (pen.)	Stadium: Stade Arthur-Buyse; Attendance: 4,800; Referee: Alain Sars

3 April 1991 Round of 32	Paris Saint-Germain	1–0	Bourges	Paris
	Vujović 55'	Report		Stadium: Parc des Princes; Attendance: 5,000; Referee: Jean-Louis Rideau

28 April 1991 Round of 16	Paris Saint-Germain	0–2	Marseille	Paris
		Report	Fournier 45'; Papin 54' (pen.)	Stadium: Parc des Princes; Attendance: 38,000; Referee: Marcel Lainé

== Statistics ==
=== Appearances and goals ===
24 players featured in at least one official match, and the club scored 42 goals in official competitions, including two own goals.

Rank	Player	Position	Appearances	Goals	Source
1	(Socialist Federal Republic of Yugoslavia) Safet Sušić	MF	40	11	
2	(France) Jocelyn Angloma	DF	39	6	
3	(France) Joël Bats	GK	39	0	
4	(France) Daniel Bravo	MF	38	8	
5	(Socialist Federal Republic of Yugoslavia) Zlatko Vujović	FW	36	11	
6	(France) Pierre Reynaud	MF	35	0	
7	(France) Franck Tanasi	DF	33	0	
8	(France) Philippe Jeannol	DF	31	0	
9	(France) Jean-Pierre Bosser	DF	27	0	
10	(France) Francis Llacer	DF	24	1	
11	(Senegal) Oumar Sène	MF	24	0	
12	(France) Antoine Kombouaré	DF	23	0	
13	(France) Christian Perez	FW	22	2	
14	(Algeria) Lyazid Sandjak	FW	20	1	
15	(France) Michel Bibard	DF	19	0	
16	(France) Pascal Nouma	FW	10	0	
17	(France) Thierry Laurey	MF	8	0	
18	(France) David Rinçon	FW	8	0	
19	(France) Jean-Luc Vasseur	DF	7	0	
20	(France) Jean-François Charbonnier	DF	6	0	
21	(Senegal) Alboury Lah	FW	6	0	
22	(France) Amara Simba	FW	5	0	
23	(France) Thomas Kokkinis	GK	1	0	
24	(France) Stéphane Persol	DF	1	0	
