= 1985–86 Paris Saint-Germain FC season =

16th season of Paris Saint-Germain

Paris Saint-Germain
1985–86 season
- President: Francis Borelli
- Manager: Gérard Houllier
- Stadium: Parc des Princes
- Ligue 1: 1st
- Coupe de France: Semi-finals
- Top goalscorer: League: Dominique Rocheteau (19); All: Dominique Rocheteau (20)
- Average home league attendance: 25,832
Home colours	Away colours

The 1985–86 season was the 16th season in the history of Paris Saint-Germain FC. PSG played their home league matches at the Parc des Princes, attracting an average of 25,832 spectators per match. The club's president was Francis Borelli, and the team was managed by Gérard Houllier, with Luis Fernandez serving as captain. PSG won the Ligue 1 title and reached the semi-finals of the Coupe de France. Dominique Rocheteau was the team's top scorer, netting 20 goals in all competitions, including 19 in the league.

== Players ==
=== Squad ===
Players who featured in at least one official match for the club.

Note: Flags indicate national team as defined under FIFA eligibility rules; some limited exceptions apply. Players may hold more than one non-FIFA nationality.

No.	Pos.	Nation	Player
—	GK	FRA	Joël Bats
—	GK	FRA	Jean-Michel Moutier
—	DF	FRA	Michel Bibard
—	DF	FRA	Thierry Morin
—	DF	FRA	Jean-Marc Pilorget
—	DF	FRA	Jean-François Charbonnier
—	DF	FRA	Philippe Jeannol
—	DF	FRA	Franck Tanasi
—	DF	FRA	Thierry Bacconnier
—	DF	FRA	Claude Lowitz
—	DF	FRA	Fabrice Poullain

No.	Pos.	Nation	Player
—	MF	FRA	Jean-Claude Lemoult
—	MF	FRA	Luis Fernandez (captain)
—	MF	SEN	Oumar Sène
—	MF	FRA	Patrice Marquet
—	MF	YUG	Safet Sušić
—	FW	NED	Pierre Vermeulen
—	FW	FRA	Alain Couriol
—	FW	FRA	Dominique Rocheteau
—	FW	FRA	Robert Jacques
—	FW	ARG	Omar da Fonseca

=== Out on loan ===
Players who were loaned out to other clubs during the season.

Note: Flags indicate national team as defined under FIFA eligibility rules; some limited exceptions apply. Players may hold more than one non-FIFA nationality.

No.	Pos.	Nation	Player
—	FW	AUT	Richard Niederbacher (at Reims)
—	FW	FRA	Franck Vandecasteele (at Alès)

No.	Pos.	Nation	Player
—	FW	FRA	Laurent Pimond (at Red Star)

== Transfers ==
=== Arrivals ===
Players who signed for the club.

Note: Flags indicate national team as defined under FIFA eligibility rules; some limited exceptions apply. Players may hold more than one non-FIFA nationality.

No.	Pos.	Nation	Player
—	GK	FRA	Joël Bats (from Auxerre)
—	DF	FRA	Michel Bibard (from Nantes)
—	DF	FRA	Claude Lowitz (from Metz)
—	MF	FRA	Fabrice Poullain (from Nantes)

No.	Pos.	Nation	Player
—	MF	SEN	Oumar Sène (from Laval)
—	MF	NED	Pierre Vermeulen (from Maastricht)
—	FW	ARG	Omar da Fonseca (from Tours)
—	FW	FRA	Robert Jacques (from Nancy)

=== Departures ===
Players who left the club.

Note: Flags indicate national team as defined under FIFA eligibility rules; some limited exceptions apply. Players may hold more than one non-FIFA nationality.

No.	Pos.	Nation	Player
—	GK	FRA	Dominique Baratelli (Retired)
—	GK	FRA	Sylvain Bied (to Valenciennes)
—	GK	FRA	Franck Mérelle (to Auxerre)
—	DF	FRA	Dominique Bathenay (to Sète)
—	DF	FRA	Yannick Guillochon (to Le Havre)
—	DF	FRA	Pascal Havet (to Red Star)
—	DF	FRA	Gérard Janvion (to Béziers)

No.	Pos.	Nation	Player
—	DF	FRA	Thierry Tinmar (to Laval)
—	MF	FRA	Gilles Cardinet (to Valenciennes)
—	MF	FRA	Gérard Lanthier (to Rennes)
—	FW	CMR	William N'Jo Léa (to Lens)
—	FW	FRA	Patrice Ségura (to Laval)
—	FW	CHA	Nambatingue Toko (to Racing CF)

== Kits ==
RTL was the shirt sponsor, and Le Coq Sportif was the kit supplier.

Home	Away

== Competitions ==
=== Overview ===
Competition	First match	Last match	Starting round	Final position	Record							
Competition	First match	Last match	Starting round	Final position	Pld	W	D	L	GF	GA	GD	Win %
Ligue 1	16 July 1985	25 April 1986	Matchday 1	Winners	38	23	10	5	66	33	+33	60.53
Coupe de France	25 January 1986	22 April 1986	Round of 64	Semi-finals	9	5	2	2	13	8	+5	55.56
Total					47	28	12	7	79	41	+38	59.57

Source: Competitions

=== Ligue 1 ===
==== League table ====
Pos	Team	Pld	W	D	L	GF	GA	GD	Pts	Qualification or relegation
1	Paris Saint-Germain (C)	38	23	10	5	66	33	+33	56	Qualification to European Cup first round
2	Nantes	38	20	13	5	53	27	+26	53	Qualification to UEFA Cup first round
3	Bordeaux	38	18	13	7	55	46	+9	49	Qualification to Cup Winners' Cup first round (Note: Bordeaux qualified for 1986–87 European Cup Winners' Cup as winners of the 1985–86 Coupe de France.)
4	Toulouse	38	18	7	13	59	44	+15	43	Qualification to UEFA Cup first round
5	Lens	38	15	13	10	51	43	+8	43	Qualification to UEFA Cup first round

Source: Histoire du PSG
Rules for classification: 1) points; 2) goal difference; 3) number of goals scored.
Victory: 2 points, Draw: 1 point, Defeat: 0 points
(C) Champions

==== Results by round ====
Round	1	2	3	4	5	6	7	8	9	10	11	12	13	14	15	16	17	18	19	20	21	22	23	24	25	26	27	28	29	30	31	32	33	34	35	36	37	38
Ground	A	H	A	H	A	H	A	H	A	H	A	A	H	A	H	A	H	A	H	A	H	A	H	A	H	A	H	A	H	H	A	H	A	H	A	H	A	H
Result	W	W	W	W	D	W	W	W	D	W	W	W	W	W	W	D	D	D	W	L	W	D	W	D	W	D	W	L	W	D	D	W	L	W	L	W	L	W
Position	2	2	1	1	1	1	1	1	1	1	1	1	1	1	1	1	1	1	1	1	1	1	1	1	1	1	1	1	1	1	1	1	1	1	1	1	1	1

Source: Histoire du PSG
A = Away; H = Home; W = Win; D = Draw; L = Loss

==== Matches ====
16 July 1985 1	Bastia	2–4	Paris Saint-Germain	Reims
	Meyer 70' (pen.); Soler 74'	Report	Rocheteau 27', 49'; Sušić 41'; Da Fonseca 54'	Stadium: Stade Auguste-Delaune; Attendance: 7,005; Referee: Jean-Marie Lartigot

19 July 1985 2	Paris Saint-Germain	3–0	Lille	Paris
	Sušić 22'; Jacques 31'; Fernandez 41'	Report		Stadium: Parc des Princes; Attendance: 15,542; Referee: Jean-Louis Rideau

26 July 1985 3	Toulouse	1–3	Paris Saint-Germain	Toulouse
	Domergue 11' (pen.)	Report	Rocheteau 14'; Jacques 23'; Sušić 73'	Stadium: Stadium de Toulouse; Attendance: 20,000; Referee: Gérard Biguet

30 July 1985 4	Paris Saint-Germain	1–0	Bordeaux	Paris
	Pilorget 15'	Report		Stadium: Parc des Princes; Attendance: 44,851; Referee: Michel Girard

2 August 1985 5	Laval	2–2	Paris Saint-Germain	Laval
	Oudjani 3' (pen.); Delamontagne 77'	Report	Fernandez 59'; Sušić 63'	Stadium: Stade Francis Le Basser; Attendance: 12,000; Referee: Michel De Zayas

9 August 1985 6	Paris Saint-Germain	2–0	Marseille	Paris
	Fernandez 1'; Jacques 22'	Report		Stadium: Parc des Princes; Attendance: 32,460; Referee: Jean-Claude Swirog

16 August 1985 7	Auxerre	0–1	Paris Saint-Germain	Auxerre
		Report	Poullain 60'	Stadium: Stade de l'Abbé-Deschamps; Attendance: 16,196; Referee: Alain Delmer

24 August 1985 8	Paris Saint-Germain	2–0	Brest	Paris
	Jeannol 45'; Rocheteau 66'	Report		Stadium: Parc des Princes; Attendance: 20,505; Referee: Jacques Ferrary

30 August 1985 9	Nice	0–0	Paris Saint-Germain	Nice
		Report		Stadium: Stade du Ray; Attendance: 16,030; Referee: Mohamed Benali

3 September 1985 10	Paris Saint-Germain	2–0	Nancy	Paris
	Jacques 33'; Rocheteau 86'	Report		Stadium: Parc des Princes; Attendance: 28,413; Referee: Ottorino Di Bernardo

14 September 1985 11	Le Havre	1–2	Paris Saint-Germain	Le Havre
	Jacquet 48'	Report	Poullain 23'; Llorens 26' (o.g.)	Stadium: Stade Jules Deschaseaux; Attendance: 9,783; Referee: Daniel Lambert

20 September 1985 12	Lens	2–3	Paris Saint-Germain	Lens
	Zaremba 33' (pen.); Vercruysse 52' (pen.)	Report	Rocheteau 66' (pen.); Jeannol 71'; Sušić 81'	Stadium: Stade Bollaert-Delelis; Attendance: 36,159; Referee: René Lopez

27 September 1985 13	Paris Saint-Germain	4–1	Sochaux	Paris
	Fernandez 21'; Rocheteau 22' (pen.), 28'; Sušić 53'	Report	Fernier 60' (pen.)	Stadium: Parc des Princes; Attendance: 25,829; Referee: Alain Delmer

4 October 1985 14	Rennes	2–3	Paris Saint-Germain	Rennes
	Lacombe 5'; Rio 83' (pen.)	Report	Jeannol 51'; Fernandez 53'; Rocheteau 80'	Stadium: Roazhon Park; Attendance: 19,745; Referee: Jacques Ferrary

11 October 1985 15	Paris Saint-Germain	2–1	Nantes	Paris
	Jeannol 25'; Fernandez 50'	Report	Bracigliano 1'	Stadium: Parc des Princes; Attendance: 45,138; Referee: Michel Vautrot

18 October 1985 16	Toulon	1–1	Paris Saint-Germain	Toulon
	Ramos 62'	Report	Sušić 75'	Stadium: Stade Mayol; Attendance: 13,356; Referee: Robert Wurtz

25 October 1985 17	Paris Saint-Germain	1–1	Strasbourg	Paris
	Rocheteau 61'	Report	Brisson 67'	Stadium: Parc des Princes; Attendance: 21,991; Referee: Jean-Pierre Blouet

2 November 1985 18	Monaco	1–1	Paris Saint-Germain	Monaco
	Dib 80'	Report	Da Fonseca 27'	Stadium: Stade Louis II; Attendance: 16,699; Referee: Gérard Biguet

8 November 1985 19	Paris Saint-Germain	2–1	Metz	Paris
	Sušić 16', 47'	Report	Bocandé 18'	Stadium: Parc des Princes; Attendance: 24,780; Referee: Ottorino Di Bernardo

22 November 1985 21	Paris Saint-Germain	3–0	Toulouse	Paris
	Rocheteau 17'; Charbonnier 32'; Fernandez 66'	Report		Stadium: Parc des Princes; Attendance: 15,381; Referee: Michel De Zayas

29 November 1985 22	Bordeaux	0–0	Paris Saint-Germain	Bordeaux
		Report		Stadium: Stade Chaban-Delmas; Attendance: 25,798; Referee: Michel Vautrot

7 December 1985 23	Paris Saint-Germain	5–1	Laval	Paris
	Rocheteau 14', 43', 65' (pen.); Sène 73'; Jeannol 89'	Report	Sène 37' (o.g.)	Stadium: Parc des Princes; Attendance: 24,445; Referee: Jean-Marie Lartigot

15 December 1985 24	Marseille	0–0	Paris Saint-Germain	Marseille
		Report		Stadium: Stade Vélodrome; Attendance: 37,058; Referee: Claude Bouillet

21 December 1985 25	Paris Saint-Germain	4–0	Auxerre	Paris
	Jeannol 48'; Gomez 67' (o.g.); Rocheteau 73'; Bacconnier 84'	Report		Stadium: Parc des Princes; Attendance: 33,764; Referee: Daniel Lambert

11 January 1986 26	Brest	1–1	Paris Saint-Germain	Brest
	Fernandez 77' (o.g.)	Report	Fernandez 15'	Stadium: Stade Francis-Le Blé; Attendance: 11,609; Referee: Michel Girard

18 January 1986 27	Paris Saint-Germain	3–2	Nice	Paris
	Rocheteau 45' (pen.); Charbonnier 66'; Sušić 82'	Report	Mège 20'; Lefebvre 89'	Stadium: Parc des Princes; Attendance: 22,936; Referee: Gérard Biguet

22 January 1986 20	Lille	2–0	Paris Saint-Germain	Lille
	Bureau 74', 80'	Report 1 Report 2		Stadium: Stade Grimonprez-Jooris; Attendance: 9,363; Referee: Mohamed Benali

2 February 1986 28	Nancy	1–0	Paris Saint-Germain	Tomblaine
	Fegic 32'	Report		Stadium: Stade Marcel Picot; Attendance: 11,039; Referee: Michel De Zayas

8 February 1986 29	Paris Saint-Germain	1–0	Le Havre	Paris
	Sène 85'	Report		Stadium: Parc des Princes; Attendance: 16,019; Referee: Jean-Marie Lartigot

22 February 1986 30	Paris Saint-Germain	2–2	Lens	Paris
	Rocheteau 39' (pen.), 61' (pen.)	Report	Ramos 1', 54' (pen.)	Stadium: Parc des Princes; Attendance: 19,744; Referee: Mohamed Benali

8 March 1986 32	Paris Saint-Germain	1–0	Rennes	Paris
	Rocheteau 4' (pen.)	Report		Stadium: Parc des Princes; Attendance: 18,048; Referee: Jean-Claude Swirog

14 March 1986 33	Nantes	2–0	Paris Saint-Germain	Nantes
	Halilhodžić 17'; Burruchaga 82'	Report		Stadium: Stade de la Beaujoire; Attendance: 25,000; Referee: Claude Bouillet

22 March 1986 34	Paris Saint-Germain	1–0	Toulon	Paris
	Sène 63'	Report		Stadium: Parc des Princes; Attendance: 12,366; Referee: Jacques Ferrary

4 April 1986 35	Strasbourg	1–0	Paris Saint-Germain	Strasbourg
	Jenner 66'	Report		Stadium: Stade de la Meinau; Attendance: 12,000; Referee: Mohamed Benali

8 April 1986 31	Sochaux	1–1	Paris Saint-Germain	Montbéliard
	Paille 53'	Report	Sène 41'	Stadium: Stade Auguste-Bonal; Attendance: 10,009; Referee: Alain Delmer

11 April 1986 36	Paris Saint-Germain	1–0	Monaco	Paris
	Sène 89'	Report		Stadium: Parc des Princes; Attendance: 25,093; Referee: Robert Wurtz

18 April 1986 37	Metz	3–1	Paris Saint-Germain	Metz
	Micciche 44'; Bocandé 69', 80' (pen.)	Report	Couriol 87'	Stadium: Stade Saint-Symphorien; Attendance: 22,605; Referee: Rémi Harrel

25 April 1986 38	Paris Saint-Germain	3–1	Bastia	Paris
	Jacques 4', 20'; Fernandez 65' (pen.)	Report	Pilorget 59' (o.g.)	Stadium: Parc des Princes; Attendance: 43,496; Referee: Gérard Biguet

=== Coupe de France ===
==== Round of 64 ====
25 January 1986 Single leg	Paris Saint-Germain	2–0	Dijon	Auxerre
	Poullain 12'; Fernandez 17'	Report		Stadium: Stade de l'Abbé-Deschamps; Attendance: 6,000; Referee: Michel Vautrot

==== Round of 32 ====
15 February 1986 First leg	Paris Saint-Germain	2–1	Montpellier	Paris
	Poullain 40'; Sène 80'	Report	Passi 10'	Stadium: Parc des Princes; Attendance: 7,811; Referee: Ottorino Di Bernardo

19 February 1986 Second leg	Montpellier	1–1 (2–3 agg.)	Paris Saint-Germain	Montpellier
	Valadier 81'	Report	Fernandez 70'	Stadium: Stade de la Mosson; Attendance: 13,000; Referee: Rémi Harrel

==== Round of 16 ====
4 March 1986 First leg	Paris Saint-Germain	1–0	Mulhouse	Paris
	Sušić 4'	Report		Stadium: Parc des Princes; Attendance: 7,000; Referee: Gérard Biguet

18 March 1986 Second leg	Mulhouse	1–2 (1–3 agg.)	Paris Saint-Germain	Mulhouse
	N'Diaye 48'	Report	Rocheteau 66' (pen.); Fernandez 88'	Stadium: Stade de l'Ill; Attendance: 16,000; Referee: Alain Delmer

==== Quarter-finals ====
29 March 1986 First leg	Lens	2–1	Paris Saint-Germain	Lens
	Ramos 41' (pen.); N'Jo Léa 88'	Report	Sušić 54'	Stadium: Stade Bollaert-Delelis; Attendance: 25,860; Referee: René Lopez

1 April 1986 Second leg	Paris Saint-Germain	2–0 (3–2 agg.)	Nantes	Paris
	Bibard 43'; Sušić 53'	Report		Stadium: Parc des Princes; Attendance: 30,000; Referee: Michel De Zayas

==== Semi-finals ====
15 April 1986 First leg	Paris Saint-Germain	1–1	Bordeaux	Paris
	Sène 13'	Report	Reinders 36'	Stadium: Parc des Princes; Attendance: 37,461; Referee: Jean-Marie Lartigot

22 April 1986 Second leg	Bordeaux	2–1 (3–2 agg.)	Paris Saint-Germain	Bordeaux
	Reinders 1'; Girard 43'	Report	Sušić 20'	Stadium: Stade Chaban-Delmas; Attendance: 27,757; Referee: Alain Delmer

== Statistics ==
=== Appearances and goals ===
21 players featured in at least one official match, and the club scored 79 goals in official competitions, including two own goals.

Rank	Player	Position	Appearances	Goals	Source
1	(France) Jean-Marc Pilorget	DF	47	1	
2	(Socialist Federal Republic of Yugoslavia) Safet Sušić	MF	46	14	
3	(France) Joël Bats	GK	46	0	
4	(France) Luis Fernandez	MF	45	12	
5	(France) Philippe Jeannol	DF	45	6	
6	(France) Dominique Rocheteau	FW	42	20	
7	(France) Fabrice Poullain	DF	39	4	
8	(France) Michel Bibard	DF	38	1	
9	(Netherlands) Pierre Vermeulen	FW	38	0	
10	(Senegal) Oumar Sène	MF	34	7	
11	(France) Thierry Bacconnier	DF	32	1	
12	(France) Robert Jacques	FW	28	6	
13	(Argentina) Omar da Fonseca	FW	25	2	
14	(France) Franck Tanasi	DF	21	0	
15	(France) Jean-François Charbonnier	DF	19	2	
16	(France) Claude Lowitz	DF	14	0	
17	(France) Jean-Claude Lemoult	MF	7	0	
18	(France) Thierry Morin	DF	2	0	
19	(France) Alain Couriol	FW	1	1	
20	(France) Jean-Michel Moutier	GK	1	0	
21	(France) Laurent Pimond	FW	1	0	
