= 1990–91 AJ Auxerre season =

AJ Auxerre
1990–91 season
- President: Jean-Claude Hamel
- Head coach: Guy Roux
- Stadium: Stade de l'Abbé-Deschamps
- Division 1: 3rd
- Coupe de France: Round of 16
- Top goalscorer: League: Kálmán Kovács (16); All: Kálmán Kovács (16)
Home colours	Away colours
- All statistics correct as of 2 April 2022.

The 1990–91 season was the 86th season in the history of AJ Auxerre and the club's 11th consecutive season in the top flight of French football. In addition to the domestic league, Auxerre participated in this season's edition of the Coupe de France.

== Competitions ==
=== Overall record ===
Competition	First match	Last match	Starting round	Final position	Record							
Competition	First match	Last match	Starting round	Final position	Pld	W	D	L	GF	GA	GD	Win %
Division 1	21 July 1990	24 May 1991	Matchday 1	3rd	38	19	10	9	63	36	+27	50.00
Coupe de France	9 March 1991	27 April 1991	Round of 64	Round of 16	3	2	1	0	4	1	+3	66.67
Total					41	21	11	9	67	37	+30	51.22

Source: Competitions

=== Division 1 ===
==== League table ====
Pos	Team	Pld	W	D	L	GF	GA	GD	Pts	Qualification or relegation
1	Marseille (C)	38	22	11	5	67	28	+39	77	Qualification to European Cup first round
2	Monaco	38	20	11	7	51	30	+21	71	Qualification to Cup Winners' Cup first round (Note: Monaco qualified for the 1991–92 European Cup Winners' Cup as winners of the 1990–91 Coupe de France.)
3	Auxerre	38	19	10	9	63	36	+27	67	Qualification to UEFA Cup first round
4	Cannes	38	12	17	9	32	28	+4	53	Qualification to UEFA Cup first round
5	Lyon	38	15	11	12	39	44	−5	56	Qualification to UEFA Cup first round

Source: Footballdatabase.eu
Rules for classification: 1) points; 2) goal difference; 3) number of goals scored.
Victory: 3 points, Draw: 1 point, Defeat: 0 points
(C) Champions

==== Results summary ====
Overall								Home						Away					
Pld	W	D	L	GF	GA	GD	Pts	W	D	L	GF	GA	GD	W	D	L	GF	GA	GD
38	19	10	9	63	36	+27	67	12	3	4	40	18	+22	7	7	5	23	18	+5

Source: French Division 1

==== Results by round ====
Round	1	2	3	4	5	6	7	8	9	10	11	12	13	14	15	16	17	18	19	20	21	22	23	24	25	26	27	28	29	30	31	32	33	34	35	36	37	38
Ground	A	H	A	H	A	H	A	H	A	H	A	A	H	A	H	A	H	A	H	A	H	A	H	A	H	A	H	A	H	H	A	H	A	H	A	H	A	H
Result	D	L	W	W	D	D	D	W	W	W	W	D	W	W	W	L	L	D	W	D	L	L	L	W	D	D	W	W	W	W	L	W	L	W	W	D	L	W
Position	9	16	6	4	4	5	5	3	2	2	2	2	2	2	1	2	2	2	2	2	2	3	3	3	3	3	4	3	3	2	3	3	3	3	3	3	3	3

Source: French Division 1
A = Away; H = Home; W = Win; D = Draw; L = Loss

==== Matches ====
21 July 1990 1	Toulouse	0–0	Auxerre	Toulouse

28 July 1990 2	Auxerre	0–1	Monaco	Auxerre

4 August 1990 3	Cannes	0–3	Auxerre	Cannes

11 August 1990 4	Auxerre	2–0	Saint-Étienne	Auxerre

18 August 1990 5	Paris Saint-Germain	1–1	Auxerre	Paris

25 August 1990 6	Auxerre	2–2	Brest	Auxerre

29 August 1990 7	Nancy	1–1	Auxerre	Tomblaine

8 September 1990 8	Auxerre	4–0	Rennes	Auxerre

15 September 1990 9	Sochaux	0–1	Auxerre	Montbéliard

23 September 1990 10	Auxerre	3–2	Montpellier	Auxerre

29 September 1990 11	Toulon	2–3	Auxerre	Toulon

6 October 1990 12	Nice	1–1	Auxerre	Nice

20 October 1990 13	Auxerre	1–0	Lyon	Auxerre

26 October 1990 14	Caen	0–1	Auxerre	Caen

3 November 1990 15	Auxerre	3–2	Lille	Auxerre

10 November 1990 16	Metz	1–0	Auxerre	Metz

24 November 1990 17	Auxerre	0–2	Nantes	Auxerre

2 December 1990 18	Bordeaux	1–1	Auxerre	Bordeaux

9 December 1990 19	Auxerre	4–0	Marseille	Auxerre

16 December 1990 20	Monaco	0–0	Auxerre	Monaco

21 December 1990 21	Auxerre	0–3	Cannes	Auxerre

13 January 1991 22	Saint-Étienne	2–1	Auxerre	Saint-Étienne

20 January 1991 23	Auxerre	0–1	Paris Saint-Germain	Auxerre

27 January 1991 24	Brest	1–3	Auxerre	Brest

3 February 1991 25	Auxerre	1–1	Nancy	Auxerre

10 February 1991 26	Rennes	2–2	Auxerre	Rennes

23 February 1991 28	Montpellier	1–2	Auxerre	Montpellier

2 March 1991 29	Auxerre	3–0	Toulon	Auxerre

12 March 1991 27	Auxerre	4–1	Sochaux	Auxerre

15 March 1991 30	Auxerre	5–1	Nice	Auxerre

23 March 1991 31	Lyon	1–0	Auxerre	Lyon

6 April 1991 32	Auxerre	3–0	Caen	Auxerre

12 April 1991 33	Lille	1–0	Auxerre	Lille

20 April 1991 34	Auxerre	3–1	Metz	Auxerre

4 May 1991 35	Nantes	2–3	Auxerre	Marseille

10 May 1991 36	Auxerre	0–0	Bordeaux	Auxerre

17 May 1991 37	Marseille	1–0	Auxerre	Marseille

24 May 1991 38	Auxerre	2–1	Toulouse	Auxerre

=== Coupe de France ===
9 March 1991 Round of 64	Olympique Saint-Quentin	0–2	Auxerre	Saint-Quentin

2 April 1991 Round of 32	Auxerre	1–0	Saint-Étienne	Auxerre

27 April 1991 Round of 16	Sochaux	1–1 (9–8 p)	Auxerre	Montbéliard
