= Laurent Pimond =

French football player (born 1965)

Personal information
- Date of birth: 6 April 1965 (age 61)
- Place of birth: Saint-Maur-des-Fossés, France
- Height: 1.77 m (5 ft 10 in)
- Position: Forward

Youth career
- 1980–1982: Sochaux
- 1982–1984: Paris Saint-Germain

Senior career*
Years	Team	Apps	(Gls)
1984–1986	Paris Saint-Germain	2	(1)
1986	→ Red Star (loan)	6	(0)
1986–1987	Versailles		
1987	Créteil		
1987–1990	Villecresnes		
1990–1991	Île-Rousse		
- Montesson
- Dourgne
- * Club domestic league appearances and goals

Laurent Pimond (born 6 April 1965) is a French former professional footballer who played as a forward.

== Career ==
Pimond joined the Paris Saint-Germain Academy in 1982, after spending two and a half years in the academy of Sochaux. He made his first appearance for Paris Saint-Germain on 28 May 1985, in a 6–1 defeat to Nancy. PSG's only goal was scored by Pimond, a free-kick that ended up in the top corner of the goal.

On 27 September 1985, Pimond made his second and final appearance for PSG in a 4–1 win over Sochaux, after coming on as a substitute in the 77th minute of the match. For the second half of the 1985–86 season, he was loaned out to Red Star, as he did not get along with the PSG coach at the time, Gérard Houllier. Despite only playing only a portion of a match for PSG in the 1985–86 season, Pimond became a champion of the French division. "I only played 15 minutes during the 85/86 season, I don't really feel like a champion, even though I am officially, on paper," he said in an interview with PSG70.

Pimond ended his loan at Red Star at the end of the season and left PSG in the summer. He joined Versailles for six months, and finished the season with Créteil. He then spent three seasons at Villecresnes before ending his career as a professional footballer at the age of 27.

== After football ==
While playing with amateur sides, Pimond worked as a sales manager for a press, television, and cinema publisher. After April 2006, he held the same position in Éditions But.

== Career statistics ==
Appearances and goals by club, season and competition
Club	Season	League			Cup		Total	
Club	Season	Division	Apps	Goals	Apps	Goals	Apps	Goals
Paris Saint-Germain	1984–85	Division 1	1	1	0	0	1	1
Paris Saint-Germain	1985–86	Division 1	1	0	0	0	1	0
Paris Saint-Germain	Total		2	1	0	0	2	1
Red Star (loan)	1985–86	Division 2	6	0	0	0	6	0
Career total			8	1	0	0	8	1

== Honours ==
Paris Saint-Germain

- Division 1: 1985–86
