= 1986–87 French Division 1 =

49th season of French Division 1

Division 1
- Season: 1986–87
- Champions: Bordeaux (4th title)
- Relegated: Sochaux; Nancy; Rennes
- European Cup: Bordeaux
- Cup Winners' Cup: Marseille
- UEFA Cup: Toulouse; Auxerre
- Matches: 380
- Goals: 796 (2.09 per match)
- Top goalscorer: Bernard Zénier (18)

Girondins de Bordeaux won Division 1 season 1986/1987 of the French Association Football League with 53 points.

== Participating teams ==
- Auxerre
- Bordeaux
- Stade Brest
- Stade Lavallois
- Le Havre AC
- RC Lens
- Lille
- Olympique Marseille
- FC Metz
- AS Monaco
- AS Nancy
- FC Nantes Atlantique
- OGC Nice
- RC Paris
- Paris Saint-Germain FC
- Stade Rennais
- AS Saint-Etienne
- FC Sochaux
- Sporting Toulon Var
- Toulouse FC
Location of teams in 1986–87 Division 1

== League table ==
Pos	Team	Pld	W	D	L	GF	GA	GD	Pts	Qualification or relegation
1	Bordeaux (C)	38	20	13	5	57	27	+30	53	Qualification to European Cup first round
2	Marseille	38	18	13	7	52	33	+19	49	Qualification to Cup Winners' Cup first round (Note: Marseille qualified for 1987–88 European Cup Winners' Cup as winners of the 1986–87 Coupe de France.)
3	Toulouse	38	18	12	8	54	32	+22	48	Qualification to UEFA Cup first round
4	Auxerre	38	17	13	8	45	32	+13	47	Qualification to UEFA Cup first round
5	Monaco	38	15	15	8	41	33	+8	45	
6	Metz	38	14	15	9	54	32	+22	43	
7	Paris Saint-Germain	38	14	13	11	35	33	+2	41	
8	Brest	38	14	12	12	43	41	+2	40	
9	Laval	38	12	14	12	40	46	−6	38	
10	Lens	38	11	15	12	37	40	−3	37	
11	Nice	38	15	7	16	38	49	−11	37	
12	Nantes	38	12	12	14	35	38	−3	36	
13	Racing Paris	38	14	8	16	41	45	−4	36	
14	Lille	38	12	10	16	39	38	+1	34	
15	Toulon	38	10	14	14	36	46	−10	34	
16	Saint-Étienne	38	9	15	14	27	32	−5	33	
17	Le Havre	38	8	16	14	39	50	−11	32	
18	Sochaux (R)	38	9	13	16	35	51	−16	31	Qualification to relegation play-offs
19	Nancy (R)	38	8	13	17	28	40	−12	29	Relegation to French Division 2
20	Rennes (R)	38	5	7	26	20	58	−38	17	Relegation to French Division 2

Source: Histoire du PSG
Rules for classification: 1) points; 2) goal difference; 3) number of goals scored.
Victory: 2 points, Draw: 1 point, Defeat: 0 points
(C) Champions; (R) Relegated
Notes:

Promoted from Division 2, who will play in Division 1 season 1987/1988

- Montpellier HSC:Champion of Division 2, winner of Division 2 group B
- Chamois Niortais:Runner-up, winner of Division 2 group A
- AS Cannes:Third place, winner of barrages against FC Sochaux

== Results ==
Home \ Away	AUX	BOR	BRE	LAV	LHA	RCL	LIL	OM	MET	ASM	NAL	FCN	NIC	PSG	RCP	REN	STE	SOC	SCT	TFC
Auxerre		0–1	1–0	1–1	1–0	3–1	1–0	0–0	0–0	1–1	4–2	1–0	2–1	1–2	2–0	1–0	3–0	0–0	2–0	2–1
Bordeaux	2–0		1–2	1–1	3–0	0–0	3–0	3–0	1–0	1–1	4–2	2–0	4–1	2–0	2–0	4–1	1–0	3–0	2–1	2–3
Brest	0–0	1–1		1–2	2–0	1–3	0–0	0–0	0–0	1–0	2–0	2–1	1–3	0–0	2–0	2–1	1–0	0–0	1–1	1–2
Laval	0–2	1–2	1–0		2–1	1–1	2–1	0–0	1–1	2–0	0–0	1–1	0–0	4–3	3–1	3–0	2–1	1–1	3–2	0–0
Le Havre	1–4	1–1	1–2	2–1		0–0	1–1	1–3	2–2	1–1	3–0	1–0	3–0	2–0	2–2	1–1	1–0	3–1	1–1	1–1
Lens	1–1	0–0	2–1	0–2	0–0		1–3	3–0	0–0	1–1	0–0	2–2	4–0	1–0	0–1	2–1	2–0	0–0	2–1	1–1
Lille	1–1	0–0	2–1	2–1	3–2	0–1		2–2	3–0	1–1	4–3	0–1	1–1	1–0	0–1	3–0	1–0	6–0	1–1	1–0
Marseille	1–1	1–1	2–2	3–0	1–1	1–3	2–0		3–2	3–1	3–2	1–0	3–1	4–0	2–0	1–0	1–0	4–0	3–0	2–1
Metz	0–1	2–1	3–0	1–0	3–0	2–0	3–0	1–1		4–1	2–0	3–1	1–1	0–0	0–2	6–1	1–1	5–1	4–0	2–0
Monaco	2–0	2–2	0–1	0–0	2–1	2–1	1–0	2–0	2–1		1–0	3–1	1–0	1–1	0–0	1–0	0–0	2–0	2–2	1–0
Nancy	1–1	0–1	0–4	3–0	0–0	1–1	0–1	0–0	0–0	1–1		0–0	1–0	0–0	2–1	2–0	1–0	0–1	3–0	2–0
Nantes	0–1	3–0	0–0	1–1	0–0	1–0	1–0	0–2	1–0	0–0	1–0		1–0	0–1	2–3	3–1	1–1	2–1	1–0	2–1
Nice	2–0	0–0	0–4	2–1	3–1	3–1	1–0	2–1	3–1	1–0	1–0	1–1		0–2	1–0	1–0	1–0	1–0	2–2	1–4
Paris SG	1–0	0–0	1–0	1–0	1–1	3–1	1–1	2–0	0–0	0–1	0–0	2–1	0–3		1–2	1–0	3–0	2–0	1–1	2–3
Racing Paris	3–0	1–2	2–2	1–1	2–1	5–0	1–0	0–1	1–1	1–1	1–0	1–1	3–1	0–1		2–1	1–2	0–2	2–0	0–0
Rennes	1–3	0–1	0–2	1–2	0–1	1–2	1–0	0–0	0–1	0–1	0–0	1–3	1–0	0–0	1–0		0–0	1–0	2–0	0–0
Saint-Étienne	1–1	2–0	1–1	0–0	1–1	1–0	1–0	0–1	0–0	0–0	0–0	0–0	1–0	1–0	4–0	2–0		1–1	1–0	0–0
Sochaux	2–2	0–2	3–0	4–0	2–1	0–0	1–0	2–0	2–2	2–1	0–1	3–1	0–0	0–1	0–1	1–1	3–3		0–1	1–1
Toulon	1–1	0–0	2–3	3–0	0–0	0–0	1–0	0–0	2–0	1–3	1–0	1–1	2–0	1–1	1–0	2–0	2–1	0–0		3–2
Toulouse	2–0	1–1	5–0	2–0	3–0	1–0	0–0	0–0	0–0	2–1	2–1	1–0	2–0	1–1	3–0	4–2	2–1	2–1	1–0	

Legend: Blue = home team win; Yellow = draw; Red = away team win.

== Relegation play-offs ==
Team 1	Agg.	Team 2	1st leg	2nd leg
Sochaux	1–2	Cannes	1–0	0–2

== Top goalscorers ==
Rank	Player	Club	Goals
1	(France) Bernard Zénier	Metz	18
2	(France) Philippe Fargeon	Bordeaux	15
2	(France) Gérard Buscher	Brest	15
4	(France) Carmelo Micciche	Metz	14
4	(Uruguay) Enzo Francescoli	RC Paris	14
4	(Argentina) Alberto Márcico	Toulouse	14
7	(France) Eric Cantona	Auxerre	13
7	(Belgium) Philippe Desmet	Lille	13
7	(France) Jean-Pierre Papin	Marseille	13
7	(Algeria) Chérif Oudjani	RC Paris	13
7	(Argentina) Victor Hugo Ramos	Toulon	13

== Attendances ==
#	Club	Average
1	Marseille	31,544
2	PSG	19,838
3	Girondins	19,180
4	Saint-Étienne	15,838
5	Nantes	15,668
6	Toulouse	13,222
7	Metz	11,883
8	Lens	11,085
9	LOSC	10,066
10	Nice	8,897
11	Le Havre	8,672
12	AJA	8,571
13	Stade brestois	8,028
14	Racing	8,000
15	Stade lavallois	7,387
16	Nancy	7,221
17	Stade rennais	7,189
18	Toulon	6,724
19	Sochaux	5,067
20	Monaco	4,428
