= Claude Lowitz =

French football player and manager (born 1962)

Personal information
- Date of birth: 29 May 1962 (age 64)
- Place of birth: Figeac, France
- Height: 1.79 m (5 ft 10 in)
- Position: Defender

Youth career
- 1977–1980: US Carjac

Senior career*
Years	Team	Apps	(Gls)
1980–1984	Toulouse	23	(2)
1984–1985	Metz	26	(2)
1985–1987	Paris Saint-Germain	28	(0)
1987–1988	Marseille	22	(0)
1988–1989	Montpellier	22	(0)
1989–1991	Nantes	28	(1)
1991–1992	Pau		
1992–1993	Cahors FC		
1993–1994	Pau		
1994–1995	Gazélec Ajaccio		
1995–1996	Jeanne d'Arc		
Total		149+	(5+)

International career
1987	France Olympic	1	(0)

Managerial career
- 2001–2002: Saint-Pierroise
- 2006: Shanghai Dongya
- * Club domestic league appearances and goals

Claude Lowitz (born 29 May 1962) is a French former professional football player and manager. As a player, he was a defender.

== Club career ==
Lowitz played for ten different clubs during his career. Those included Toulouse, Metz, Paris Saint-Germain, Marseille, Montpellier, Nantes, Pau FC, Cahors FC, Gazélec Ajaccio, and Jeanne d'Arc. In 1984 with Metz, he notably featured in a 4–1 win over Barcelona at the Camp Nou in the Cup Winners' Cup first round, eliminating the Spanish side 6–5 on aggregate. During the 1985–86 season with Paris Saint-Germain, he won the Division 1 title.

== International career ==
Lowitz played one match for the France Olympic football team in 1987.

== Post-playing career ==
Having retired from football five years earlier, Lowitz became the manager of Saint-Pierroise in Réunion in 2001; however, he left this role in 2002. From January to July 2006, he was the manager of China League Two club Shanghai Dongya. He left that position to work for the youth academy of the club at the Genbao Football Base from 2006 to 2008.

After leaving his academy role at Shanghai Dongya in 2008, Lowitz worked for a football academy in Réunion.

== Honours ==
Toulouse

- Division 2: 1981–82

Paris Saint-Germain

- Division 1: 1985–86
