= Didier Rabat =

French footballer (born 1966)

Personal information
- Date of birth: 2 August 1966
- Place of birth: Nouméa, New Caledonia
- Date of death: 10 August 2022 (aged 56)
- Height: 1.89 m (6 ft 2 in)
- Position: Midfielder

Youth career
- Monaco

Senior career*
Years	Team	Apps	(Gls)
–1985	Monaco B		
1985–1987	Limoges	44	(11)
1987–1990	PSG	0	(0)
1987–1988	→ Laval (loan)	19	(1)
1988–1989	→ Orléans (loan)	12	(2)
1989–1990	→ PSG B (loan)		
1990–1993	Pau		
1993–1995	Lyon Duchère	10	(0)
1995–1999	Toulon	95	(12)
1998	→ Notts County (loan)	0	(0)
- * Club domestic league appearances and goals

Didier Rabat (born 2 August 1966) is a French former footballer who is last known to have played as a midfielder for Toulon.

== Career ==
In 1985, Rabat signed for Limoges in the French second division after playing for the reserves of French Ligue 1 side Monaco.

In 1988, he was sent on loan to Laval in the French second division from PSG, one of France's most successful clubs, where he suffered a torn ligament injury.

In 1990, Rabat signed for Pau in the French third division.

In 1995, he signed for French second division team Toulon, before joining Notts County in the English lower leagues.
