= Robert Jacques (footballer, born 1957) =

French football player and manager

Personal information
- Date of birth: 16 February 1957 (age 69)
- Place of birth: Petit-Bourg, Guadeloupe
- Height: 1.75 m (5 ft 9 in)
- Positions: Winger; forward

Youth career
- –1971: Arsenal Club
- 1971–1973: Rosendaël
- 1973–1976: INF Vichy

Senior career*
Years	Team	Apps	(Gls)
1976–1982	Valenciennes	130	(11)
1982–1985	Nancy	105	(27)
1985–1986	Paris Saint-Germain	27	(6)
1986–1988	Saint-Étienne	21	(3)
1986–1988	Saint-Étienne B	28	(7)
Total		311	(54)

Managerial career
- 2007–2010: Arsenal Club
- * Club domestic league appearances and goals

Robert "Bobby" Jacques (born 16 February 1957) is a French former professional football player and manager.

== Biography ==
He then signed with AS Saint-Étienne. Robert Herbin, the Saint-Étienne coach, did not consider him a starter, and he played only twenty-one games over two seasons. He ended his professional career at the end of the 1987 season and then returned to Guadeloupe.

In 2007, he coached Arsenal Club Petit Bourg, his first club, in Guadeloupe. He left that position in August 2010.

== Honours ==
Paris Saint-Germain

- Division 1: 1985–86
