= 1990–91 French Division 1 =

53rd season of French Division 1

Division 1
- Season: 1990–91
- Champions: Marseille (7th title)
- Relegated: Bordeaux; Brest; Nice
- European Cup: Marseille
- UEFA Cup: Auxerre; Cannes; Lyon
- Cup Winners' Cup: Monaco
- Matches: 380
- Goals: 805 (2.12 per match)
- Top goalscorer: Jean-Pierre Papin (23)

The 1990–91 Division 1 season was won by Marseille, with 55 points, for the third year in a row. A total of 20 clubs competed in the league. Bordeaux, Brest and Nice were all administratively relegated to Division 2 due to financial difficulties at the end of the season despite all finishing above the relegation zone.

== Participating teams ==
- AJ Auxerre
- FC Girondins de Bordeaux
- Stade Brestois 29
- Stade Malherbe Caen
- AS Cannes
- Lille OSC
- Olympique Lyonnais
- Olympique de Marseille
- FC Metz
- AS Monaco FC
- Montpellier HSC
- AS Nancy
- FC Nantes Atlantique
- OGC Nice
- Paris Saint-Germain F.C.
- Stade Rennais
- AS Saint-Etienne
- FC Sochaux-Montbéliard
- Sporting Toulon Var
- Toulouse FC
Location of teams in 1990–91 Division 1

== League table ==
Pos	Team	Pld	W	D	L	GF	GA	GD	Pts	Qualification or relegation
1	Marseille (C)	38	22	11	5	67	28	+39	55	Qualification to European Cup first round
2	Monaco	38	20	11	7	51	30	+21	51	Qualification to Cup Winners' Cup first round (Note: Monaco qualified for the 1991–92 European Cup Winners' Cup as winners of the 1990–91 Coupe de France.)
3	Auxerre	38	19	10	9	63	36	+27	48	Qualification to UEFA Cup first round
4	Cannes	38	12	17	9	32	28	+4	41	Qualification to UEFA Cup first round
5	Lyon	38	15	11	12	39	44	−5	41	Qualification to UEFA Cup first round
6	Lille	38	11	17	10	39	37	+2	39	
7	Montpellier	38	12	14	12	44	35	+9	38	
8	Caen	38	13	12	13	38	36	+2	38	
9	Paris Saint-Germain	38	13	12	13	40	42	−2	38	
10	Bordeaux (R)	38	11	15	12	34	32	+2	37	Administratively relegated to French Division 2 (Note: Bordeaux, Brest and Nice were administratively relegated to Division 2 due to financial difficulties.)
11	Brest (R)	38	11	15	12	45	46	−1	37	Administratively relegated to French Division 2
12	Metz	38	12	12	14	44	51	−7	36	
13	Saint-Étienne	38	13	9	16	40	46	−6	35	
14	Nice (R)	38	10	14	14	40	42	−2	34	Administratively relegated to French Division 2
15	Nantes	38	9	16	13	34	44	−10	34	
16	Toulon	38	9	16	13	31	41	−10	34	
17	Nancy	38	11	11	16	38	58	−20	33	
18	Sochaux	38	8	16	14	24	33	−9	32	
19	Toulouse	38	8	15	15	33	45	−12	31	
20	Rennes	38	7	14	17	29	51	−22	28	

Source: Histoire du PSG
Rules for classification: 1) points; 2) goal difference; 3) number of goals scored.
Victory: 3 points, Draw: 1 point, Defeat: 0 points
(C) Champions; (R) Relegated
Notes:

Promoted from Division 2, who will play in 1991–92 French Division 1 season

- Le Havre AC: Champion of Division 2, winner of Division 2 group B
- Nîmes Olympique: Runner-up, winner of Division 2 group A
- Lens:Third place, winner of barrages.

== Results ==
Home \ Away	AUX	BOR	BRE	CAE	CAN	LIL	OL	OM	MET	ASM	MHS	NAL	FCN	NIC	PSG	REN	STE	SOC	SCT	TFC
Auxerre		0–0	2–2	3–0	0–3	3–2	1–0	4–0	3–1	0–1	3–2	1–1	0–2	5–1	0–1	4–0	2–0	4–1	3–0	2–1
Bordeaux	1–1		1–4	1–1	1–1	1–1	0–0	1–1	1–1	0–0	1–0	5–0	2–0	3–0	3–0	1–0	2–1	1–0	0–1	2–1
Brest	1–3	4–0		5–0	3–2	1–0	3–0	1–1	1–0	1–2	1–1	3–3	1–0	4–0	0–0	0–0	0–1	0–0	2–2	0–0
Caen	0–1	2–0	1–2		0–1	0–0	1–0	0–0	4–1	0–2	1–0	4–1	1–0	2–1	2–0	2–0	1–0	2–0	2–0	2–0
Cannes	0–3	1–1	0–0	1–1		2–1	3–2	0–0	0–1	1–2	2–1	1–0	2–1	2–1	2–0	1–0	0–1	1–1	0–0	0–0
Lille	1–0	0–0	1–0	1–0	0–2		1–1	1–0	4–1	0–0	1–0	0–2	1–1	0–0	0–0	1–1	3–2	0–1	4–1	3–0
Lyon	1–0	1–0	2–0	3–2	1–0	2–1		2–2	3–1	1–0	3–3	0–1	2–0	1–0	0–0	0–0	1–1	1–0	1–1	4–1
Marseille	1–0	2–0	3–1	2–1	0–1	2–0	7–0		3–0	1–0	2–0	6–2	6–0	1–0	2–1	4–1	3–1	0–0	3–3	1–0
Metz	1–0	1–0	0–0	1–1	0–0	2–2	1–2	0–2		1–1	0–0	4–0	2–0	1–0	2–2	2–0	3–1	2–2	0–0	2–1
Monaco	0–0	2–0	5–0	2–0	0–0	1–1	0–0	1–3	2–0		3–1	2–2	2–1	2–1	2–0	2–1	2–0	1–0	2–1	2–1
Montpellier	1–2	2–1	1–0	0–0	0–0	1–2	1–0	0–0	5–2	2–1		5–0	1–1	3–0	4–0	1–0	0–0	2–0	0–0	2–0
Nancy	1–1	0–2	0–0	0–0	2–0	1–1	2–0	2–0	0–1	4–0	1–1		3–2	2–1	0–2	0–0	1–0	2–0	2–1	1–1
Nantes	2–3	0–0	1–0	0–0	1–0	0–0	0–0	1–1	1–1	3–1	1–1	1–0		2–2	2–0	2–0	2–1	0–0	0–0	0–0
Nice	1–1	0–0	2–0	0–0	0–0	4–1	1–1	0–1	1–2	0–0	2–0	3–0	1–1		1–1	2–2	2–0	3–0	0–0	1–1
Paris SG	1–1	1–0	1–1	3–2	0–0	2–0	3–0	0–1	2–1	0–2	2–0	2–1	1–1	0–2		1–1	4–2	0–2	4–0	3–0
Rennes	2–2	2–1	3–0	1–1	1–1	1–3	2–0	1–1	0–2	1–1	1–2	1–0	2–0	0–3	2–1		0–2	1–1	0–0	2–0
Saint-Étienne	2–1	0–0	6–1	0–0	1–0	0–0	0–1	1–1	2–1	1–0	1–0	4–1	1–3	1–0	1–1	0–0		2–1	3–0	1–4
Sochaux	0–1	1–0	1–1	1–0	0–0	0–0	1–2	2–1	1–1	0–2	0–0	1–0	1–1	0–0	0–0	4–0	2–0		0–0	0–1
Toulon	2–3	0–2	1–2	0–0	0–0	0–0	1–0	0–1	2–1	1–1	1–1	2–0	3–1	1–2	0–0	1–0	3–0	1–0		1–0
Toulouse	0–0	0–0	0–0	3–2	2–2	2–2	3–1	0–2	2–1	1–2	0–0	0–0	2–0	1–2	2–1	2–0	0–0	0–0	1–1	

Legend: Blue = home team win; Yellow = draw; Red = away team win.

== Statistics ==
=== Top goalscorers ===
Rank	Player	Club	Goals
1	(France) Jean-Pierre Papin	Marseille	23
2	(Hungary) Kálmán Kovács	Auxerre	15
3	(France) Laurent Blanc	Montpellier	14
3	(Belgium) Enzo Scifo	Auxerre	14
5	(Socialist Federal Republic of Yugoslavia) Aljoša Asanović	Metz	13
5	(Cameroon) François Omam-Biyik	Rennes	13
7	(France) Bernard Ferrer	Brest	12
7	(France) Daniel Xuereb	Montpellier	12
9	(France) Fabrice Divert	Caen	11
10	(Senegal) Jules Bocandé	Nice	10
10	(France) François Brisson	Lille	10
10	(France) François Calderaro	Metz	10
10	(France) Christophe Cocard	Auxerre	10
10	(France) Fabrice Mege	Nice	10
10	(France) Amara Simba	Cannes	10
10	(Socialist Federal Republic of Yugoslavia) Safet Sušić	Paris Saint-Germain	10
10	(Poland) Ryszard Tarasiewicz	Nancy	10
10	(Socialist Federal Republic of Yugoslavia) Zlatko Vujović	Paris Saint-Germain	10
10	(Liberia) George Weah	Monaco	10

== Attendances ==
#	Club	Average
1	Marseille	31,025
2	Olympique lyonnais	20,610
3	Girondins	14,947
4	PSG	14,454
5	Saint-Étienne	12,626
6	Metz	11,407
7	MHSC	10,683
8	Nantes	10,353
9	Stade brestois	9,468
10	Stade rennais	8,973
11	Caen	8,748
12	AJA	8,689
13	Toulouse	8,628
14	Nancy	7,928
15	LOSC	7,884
16	Nice	7,121
17	Monaco	5,877
18	Cannes	4,544
19	Toulon	4,259
20	Sochaux	3,971
