= Alain Polaniok =

French footballer (1958–2005)

Personal information
- Date of birth: 19 September 1958
- Place of birth: Givet, France
- Date of death: 12 September 2005 (aged 46)
- Place of death: Saint-Germain-de-la-Grange, France
- Height: 1.80 m (5 ft 11 in)
- Position: Midfielder

Senior career*
Years	Team	Apps	(Gls)
1975–1976	Sedan		
1976–1980	Reims	112	(21)
1980–1981	Metz	26	(2)
1981–1982	Laval	66	(2)
1982–1985	Tours	107	(28)
1985–1986	Matra Racing		(8)
1986–1987	Paris Saint-Germain	15	(1)
1987–1988	Cannes	33	(1)
1988–1989	Paris Saint-Germain	33	(1)
1989–1993	Red Star	69	(8)
- * Club domestic league appearances and goals

Alain Polaniok (19 September 1958 – 12 September 2005) was a French footballer who played as a midfielder.
