= Thomas Kokkinis =

French footballer (born 1971)

Personal information
- Date of birth: 8 August 1971 (age 55)
- Place of birth: Rueil-Malmaison, France
- Height: 1.85 m (6 ft 1 in)
- Position: Goalkeeper

Youth career
- AS Poissy
- Paris Saint-Germain

Senior career*
| Years | Team | Apps | (Gls) |
| 1987–1992 | Paris Saint-Germain (B team) | | |
| 1990–1991 | Paris Saint-Germain | 1 | (0) |
| 1991 | → Bastia (loan) | 5 | (0) |
| 1991–1992 | → Red Star (loan) | 16 | (0) |
| 1992–1995 | Metz | 13 | (0) |
| 1992 | → Rouen (loan) | 7 | (0) |
| 1996–1997 | AS Poissy | | |
| 1997–1998 | SAS Épinal | | |
| 1998–2005 | AS Cherbourg | | |
| 2005–2007 | Croix-de-Savoie | | |
| 2007–2008 | FC Mantois 78 | | |
- * Club domestic league appearances and goals

Thomas Kokkinis (born 8 August 1971) is a French former professional footballer who played as a goalkeeper. He played at the professional level in Ligue 1 for Paris Saint-Germain and Metz and in Ligue 2 for Bastia, Red Star Saint-Ouen and Rouen.

== Career ==
From the age of 12 to 16, Kokkinis played for AS Poissy, before joining Paris Saint-Germain's academy. He made his Ligue 1 debut with Paris Saint-Germain in August 1990.

== Personal life ==
Kokkinis plays golf and was placed 8th among French amateurs over the age of 35 in 2000.
