= Thierry Laurey =

French footballer (born 1964)

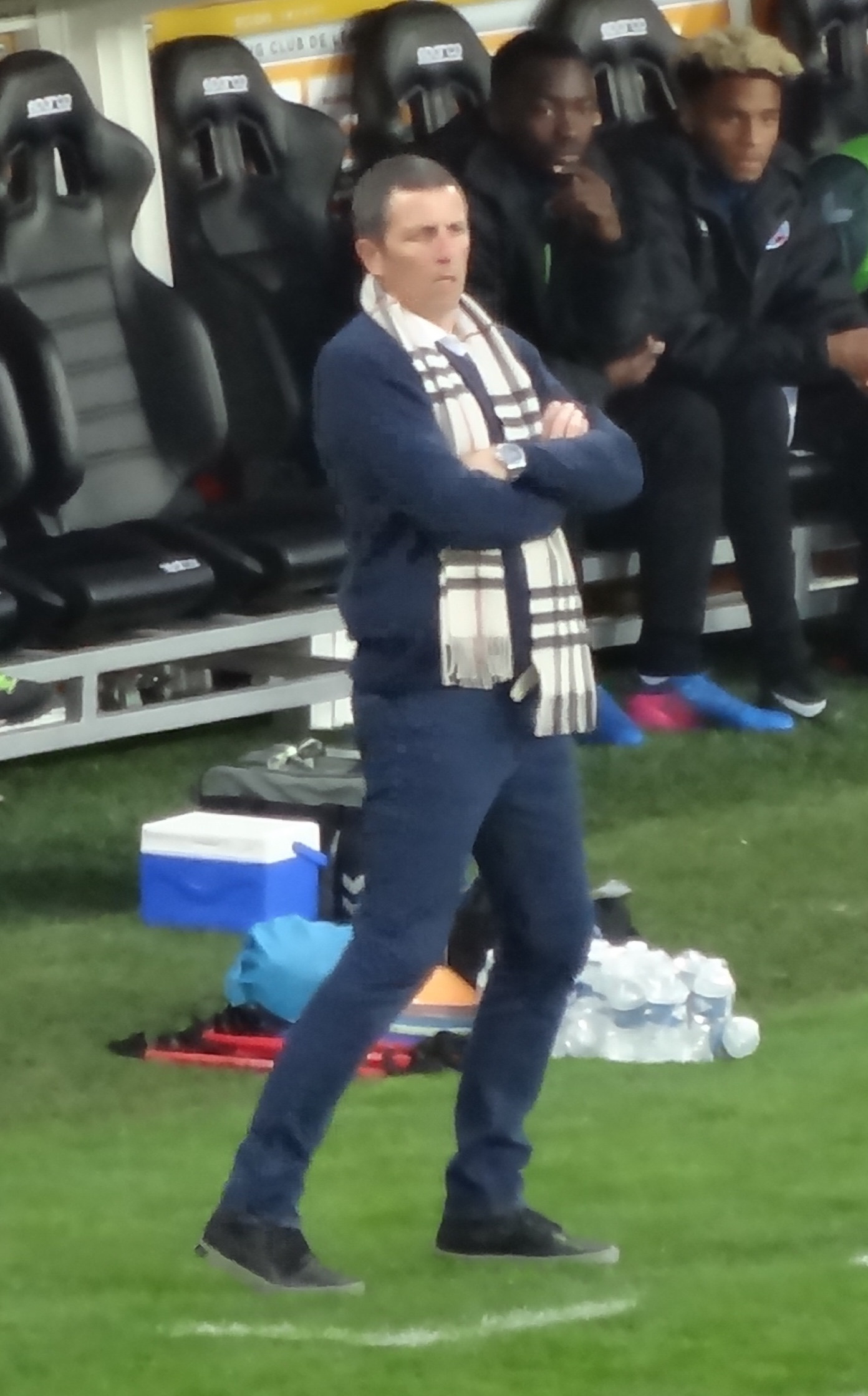
- Laurey as Strasbourg manager in 2017

Personal information
- Date of birth: 17 February 1964 (age 62)
- Place of birth: Troyes, France
- Height: 1.86 m (6 ft 1 in)
- Positions: Defender; midfielder

Youth career
- 1972–1977: FC Saint-Mesmin
- 1977–1980: Troyes
- 1980–1981: USM Romilly
- 1981–1982: Valenciennes

Senior career*
Years	Team	Apps	(Gls)
1982–1986	Valenciennes	106	(9)
1986–1987	Marseille	27	(1)
1987–1988	Montpellier	34	(10)
1988–1990	Sochaux	68	(12)
1990	Paris Saint-Germain	8	(0)
1991	Saint-Étienne	25	(3)
1991–1998	Montpellier	186	(8)
Total		454	(43)

International career
1989	France	1	(0)

Managerial career
- 2007–2008: Sète
- 2008–2009: Amiens
- 2011–2012: Arles-Avignon
- 2013–2016: Gazélec Ajaccio
- 2016–2021: Strasbourg
- 2021–2023: Paris FC
- 2024: Martigues
- * Club domestic league appearances and goals

Thierry Laurey (born 17 February 1964) is a French professional football manager and former player who played as a defender and midfielder who was most recently the head coach of Ligue 2 club Martigues.

As a manager, he led Gazélec Ajaccio to consecutive promotions from the Championnat National to Ligue 1. In five years as manager of RC Strasbourg Alsace, he won Ligue 2 in 2016–17 and the Coupe de la Ligue in 2018–19.

== Playing career ==
Laurey earned one cap for France on 8 March 1989. He played in a 2–0 loss to Scotland at Hampden Park in 1990 FIFA World Cup qualification.

== Managerial career ==
=== Early years ===
After ending his club career at Montpellier, Laurey began his coaching career at an assistant manager at the same club, serving several managers over the next eight years. His first job as a head coach was at Sète in the third-tier Championnat National for 2007–08, finishing 6th.

In June 2008, Laurey was hired by Amiens SC in Ligue 2. His one season ended with relegation to the Championnat National.

Laurey became director of football at Saint-Étienne – where he had played – in March 2011. In November, he returned to Ligue 2 management at Arles-Avignon. His team were in last place when he replaced Faruk Hadžibegić, but climbed to safety with a long unbeaten run. In the 2012–13 Coupe de la Ligue, he led the team into the last 16 with wins over Guingamp, Gazélec Ajaccio and Ajaccio, but was fired on 5 November 2012 after a 4–1 loss at nearby Nîmes.

=== Gazélec ===
In February 2013, Laurey was the third manager of the season at Gazélec, who were six points inside the relegation zone. Their season ended with relegation to the Championnat National, followed by immediate return in third place behind Orléans and Luzenac, the latter of whom were barred from Ligue 2 for licensing reasons.

In the 2014–15 Ligue 2, Gazélec were promoted in second place behind Troyes to reach Ligue 1 for the first time; the club prepared for their maiden top-flight season with a budget of €12 million, half of that of Corsican neighbours Bastia and one-fortieth of the budget for champions Paris Saint-Germain. Laurey's team reached the quarter-finals of the Coupe de France in 2015–16 before a 3–0 loss at Lorient. The season ended in relegation and Laurey was permitted to speak to other clubs, despite having a year left on his contract.

=== Strasbourg ===
On 31 May 2016, Laurey was signed to a two-year contract by newly promoted Ligue 2 team Strasbourg, a day after Jacky Duguépéroux left their managerial post. He led the team to the title in his first season, ending a nine-year exile from the top flight, and was rewarded with a new contract to last until 2019.

Laurey added another year to his contract in December 2018, to last until June 2020. On 30 March 2019, he won the Coupe de la Ligue final on penalties against Guingamp after a goalless draw; it was the Alsatian club's third such title and first since 2005. The result put the team in European competition for the first time in 14 years, and the first of Laurey's career: they eliminated Maccabi Haifa and Lokomotiv Plovdiv in UEFA Europa League qualifying rounds before falling to Eintracht Frankfurt in the playoffs.

In March 2020, Laurey signed a new contract to stay for one more year at the Stade de la Meinau. Club president Marc Keller chose to let it expire in May 2021.

=== Paris FC ===
On 20 June 2021, Laurey was appointed as head coach of Ligue 2 side Paris FC, on a two-year contract. The team had recently finished fifth and been eliminated from the play-offs by Grenoble. In the 2021–22 Coupe de France, his team won 14–0 at home to CSC de Cayenne from French Guiana in the eighth round, but the next round at the Stade Sébastien Charléty against Lyon was abandoned due to fan violence, leading to both clubs being expelled. A 4th-place league finish was met with another play-off elimination, by Sochaux in the last second after missing two penalties in a 2–1 home loss.

On 3 June 2023, Laurey left the 13th arrondissement club at the end of his contract, having come 7th in his latter season. His assistant Stéphane Gilli succeeded him.

=== Martigues ===
On 2 July 2024, Laurey joined newly-promoted Ligue 2 club Martigues.

== Managerial statistics ==
As of match played 13 December 2024

Managerial record by team and tenure
Team	From	To	Record								
Team	From	To	P	W	D	L	GF	GA	GD	Win %	Ref.
Sète	22 June 2007	7 June 2008	41	15	16	10	43	32	+11	36.59	
Amiens	7 June 2008	17 June 2009	40	9	16	15	37	44	−7	22.50	
Arles-Avignon	28 November 2011	3 November 2012	40	13	18	9	39	44	−5	32.50	
Gazélec Ajaccio	19 February 2013	25 May 2016	132	48	37	47	152	153	−1	36.36	
Strasbourg	31 May 2016	24 May 2021	209	81	51	77	311	302	+9	38.76	
Paris FC	20 June 2021	3 June 2023	84	40	22	22	129	85	+44	47.62	
Martigues	2 July 2024	16 December 2024	17	3	3	11	13	34	−21	17.65	
Total			563	209	163	191	724	694	+30	37.12	—

== Honours ==
=== Player ===
Marseille

- Division 1 runner-up: 1986–87
- Coupe de France runner-up: 1986–87

Montpellier

- Coupe de France runner-up: 1993–94
- Coupe d'Été runner-up: 1994

=== Manager ===
Strasbourg

- Ligue 2: 2016–17
- Coupe de la Ligue: 2018–19
