= Éric Martin (footballer, born 1959) =

French footballer

Personal information
- Date of birth: 29 August 1959 (age 67)
- Place of birth: Verdun, France
- Height: 1.71 m (5 ft 7 in)
- Position: Midfielder

Youth career
- INF Vichy
- SA Verdun
- 1976–1979: Nancy

Senior career*
| Years | Team | Apps | (Gls) |
| 1979–1986 | Nancy | 236 | (7) |
| 1986–1988 | Paris Saint-Germain | 16 | (1) |
| 1988–1989 | Paris Saint-Germain B | | |
| 1989–1992 | Nancy | 62 | (2) |
| Total | | 314+ | (10+) |

International career
- France U21
- * Club domestic league appearances and goals

Éric Martin (born 29 August 1959) is a French former professional footballer who played as a midfielder. As of 2021, he is a scout for Ligue 2 club Nancy.

== After football ==
After retiring from football, Martin became a scout for Nancy. He also worked as a supervisor for Valenciennes.

== Honours ==
Nancy

- Division 2: 1989–90
