= Lyazid Sandjak =

Algerian footballer (born 1966)

Liazid Sandjak
Personal information
- Date of birth: 11 September 1966 (age 60)
- Place of birth: Montreuil-sous-Bois, France
- Height: 1.83 m (6 ft 0 in)
- Position: Midfielder

Youth career
- Olympique Noisy-le-Sec

Senior career*
Years	Team	Apps	(Gls)
1986–1992	Paris Saint-Germain	76	(9)
1992–1995	Nice	97	(29)
1995–1996	Saint-Étienne	33	(8)
1996–1998	Neuchâtel Xamax	37	(8)
1998–2004	Olympique Noisy-le-Sec	106	(7)
Total		341	(63)

International career
1987–1992	Algeria	5	(1)
- * Club domestic league appearances and goals

Liazid Sandjak (born 11 September 1966) is a former Algerian international footballer. In his career, he was a midfielder for several French and Swiss clubs and member of the Algeria national team.

== Career ==
Sandjak played professional football with Paris Saint-Germain F.C., OGC Nice, AS Saint-Étienne and Neuchâtel Xamax. Late in his career, he played amateur football with Olympique Noisy-le-Sec, where he received a two-year ban for shoving the referee after a match against Alès in October 2000. After retiring from playing, Sandjak transitioned into coaching, managing several clubs, particularly in the Paris region. He also continues to actively follow the Algerian national team, regularly appearing in sports media as a football pundit and analyst.

Sandjak made a substitute's appearance for the Algeria national football team in a 1988 African Cup of Nations qualifier against Tunisia in April 1987. He also appeared in the 1992 African Cup of Nations finals in Senegal.
