= 1985–86 Coupe de France =

Tournament details
- Country: France

Final positions
- Champions: Girondins de Bordeaux
- Runners-up: Olympique de Marseille

The Coupe de France 1985–86 was its 69th edition. It was won by Girondins de Bordeaux which defeated Olympique de Marseille in the final.

== Round of 16 ==
Team 1	Agg.	Team 2	1st leg	2nd leg
Stade Brestois (D1)	2–5	AJ Auxerre (D1)	2–4	0–1
Paris SG (D1)	3–1	FC Mulhouse (D2)	1–0	2–1
ECAC Chaumont (D2)	0–5	Girondins de Bordeaux (D1)	0–0	0–5
FC Rouen (D2)	1–3	Stade Rennais (D1)	1–1	0–2
Limoges FC (D2)	4–8	RC Lens (D1)	3–4	1–4
Olympique de Marseille (D1)	4–1	CS Blénod (D4)	3–0	1–1
Stade Lavallois (D1)	1–3	RC Paris (D2)	1–0	0–3
RC Strasbourg (D1)	0–3	Tours FC (D2)	0–0	0–3

== Quarter-finals ==
Team 1	Agg.	Team 2	1st leg	2nd leg
RC Lens (D1)	2–3	Paris SG (D1)	2–1	0–2
RC Paris (D2)	2–3	Olympique de Marseille (D1)	1–2	1–1
AJ Auxerre (D1)	2–3	Stade Rennais (D1)	1–1	1–2
Tours FC (D2)	0–2	Girondins de Bordeaux (D1)	0–1	0–1

== Semi-finals ==
=== First leg ===
15 April 1986

Paris Saint-Germain (1)	1–1	Bordeaux (1)
Sène 13'		Reinders 36'

Parc des Princes, Paris
Attendance: 37,461
Referee: Jean-Marie Lartigot

15 April 1986

Marseille (1)	1–0	Rennes (1)
Martinez 23'

Stade Vélodrome, Marseille
Attendance: 28,627
Referee: Gérard Biguet

=== Second leg ===
22 April 1986

Bordeaux (1)	2–1	Paris Saint-Germain (1)
Reinders 1'; Girard 43'		Sušić 20'

Parc Lescure, Bordeaux
Attendance: 27,757
Referee: Alain Delmer

Bordeaux won 3–2 on aggregate.

22 April 1986

Rennes (1)	1–1	Marseille (1)
Relmy 51'		Diallo 78'

Stade de la Route de Lorient, Rennes
Attendance: 25,560
Referee: Robert Wurtz

Marseille won 2–1 on aggregate.

== Final ==
30 April 1986

Bordeaux	2–1 (a.e.t.)	Marseille
Tigana 52'; Giresse 116'		Diallo 45' (pen.)

Parc des Princes, Paris
Attendance: 45,429
Referee: Joël Quiniou
