= Uwe Reinders =

German footballer and manager

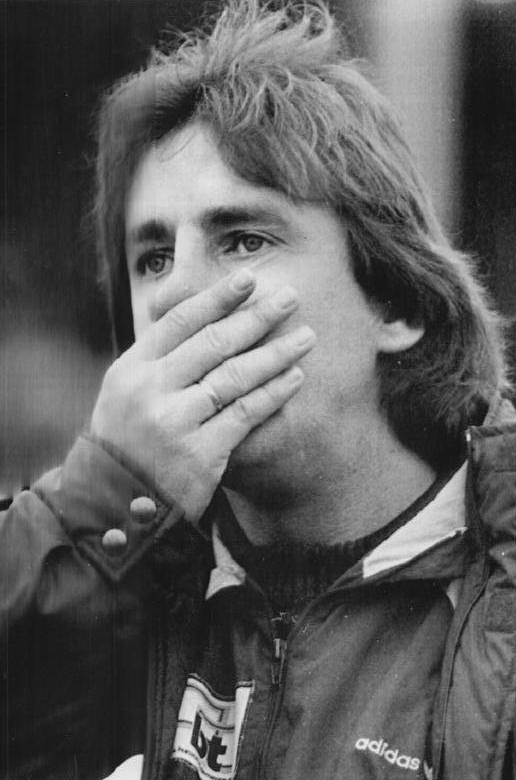
- Reinders managing Rostock in 1990

Personal information
- Date of birth: 19 January 1955 (age 71)
- Place of birth: Essen, West Germany
- Height: 1.87 m (6 ft 2 in)
- Position: Forward

Youth career
- 1961–1962: TBV Frillendorf
- 1962–1974: Polizei SV Essen

Senior career*
Years	Team	Apps	(Gls)
1974–1977	Schwarz-Weiß Essen	40	(8)
1977–1985	Werder Bremen	243	(83)
1985–1986	Bordeaux	36	(15)
1986–1987	Rennes	10	(0)
1987–1989	Eintracht Braunschweig	18	(8)
Total		347	(114)

International career
1982	West Germany	4	(1)

Managerial career
- 1987–1990: Eintracht Braunschweig
- 1990–1992: Hansa Rostock
- 1992–1993: MSV Duisburg
- 1993–1994: Hertha BSC
- 1994–1997: Sachsen Leipzig
- 2002–2004: Eintracht Braunschweig
- 2005: 1. FC Pforzheim
- 2005: Brinkumer SV
- 2011: FC Oberneuland
- * Club domestic league appearances and goals

Uwe Reinders (born 19 January 1955) is a German former footballer and manager.

A former forward, Reinders played 206 times and scored 67 goals for Werder Bremen in the Bundesliga between 1977 and 1985. Abroad he played for Girondins de Bordeaux (1985–1986) and Stade Rennais (1986–1987). He appeared four times for West Germany, his most prominent participation was the one in the 1982 World Cup finals, where he scored the fourth goal in West Germany 4–1 win over Chile in the first round. His only goal in his short national team career. In 1987, Reinders became player manager at Eintracht Braunschweig.

== Coaching career ==
After retiring from playing, he continued his managerial career at then 2. Bundesliga side Eintracht Braunschweig in 1988–1989. After two seasons as manager with Braunschweig he departed from the club, taking over Hansa Rostock in East Germany's NOFV Oberliga Nordost, previously known as DDR-Oberliga. As East Germany's Deutscher Fußball-Verband was to finally merge into Deutscher Fußball Bund after that, the 1990–91 season worked out to be the factor for those former DDR-Oberliga clubs to enqueue into the German football league structure. Under Reinders guidance Rostock won the final edition of the East German Cup (against FC Stahl Eisenhüttenstadt) and also grabbed the NOFV Oberliga Nordost title, which meant the team qualified to start in the Bundesliga in the 1991–92 season. Enjoying a fantastic start to the 1991–92 season, Rostock's form slumped massively and, with the threat of relegation rising, let the club sack him on 6 March 1992.

Just a month later he was back in charge of a Bundesliga outfit, successing Willibert Kremer at fellow relegation threatened MSV Duisburg. Reinders failed to avoid relegation with them. The begin of the then next season saw Reinders keep on at MSV, but on 21 October 1993, he left the Ruhr club to take charge of fellow 2. Bundesliga side Hertha BSC. A job in which he lasted only five months before the faced the sack. It took nearly eight years to enable him a return to management in the top division of German football. On 25 October 2002, Eintracht Braunschweig of 2. Bundesliga re-appointed Reinders as manager, he succeeded Peter Vollmann at the just re-promoted club. However, he could not keep Braunschweig up and was, following an uninspiring run through the lower Regionalliga Nord, sacked by them on 2 March 2004.

Reinders' next jobs were 1. FC Pforzheim, and then Brinkumer SV, a club promoted to the fourth tier of German football, Oberliga Nord, at the start of the 2005–06 season. Yet, he was not for long their manager, he resigned from his role mid-way through their campaign at a time when the club was only second from bottom with just seven points in the bank.

== Honours ==
=== Player ===
Werder Bremen

- Bundesliga runners-up: 1982–83, 1984–85

Bordeaux

- Coupe de France: 1986

West Germany

- FIFA World Cup finalist: 1982
