= 1986–87 Coupe de France =

Tournament details
- Country: France

Final positions
- Champions: Girondins de Bordeaux
- Runners-up: Olympique de Marseille

The Coupe de France 1986–87 was its 70th edition. It was won by Girondins de Bordeaux which defeated Olympique de Marseille in the final.

== Round of 16 ==
Team 1	Agg.	Team 2	1st leg	2nd leg
Stade Lavallois (D1)	2–2 (a)	Stade Brestois (D1)	0–1	2–1
Lille OSC (D1)	5–3	AJ Auxerre (D1)	3–0	2–2
Girondins de Bordeaux (D1)	3–2	AS Monaco (D1)	2–0	1–2
Olympique de Marseille (D1)	5–2	Olympique Lyonnais (D2)	3–0	2–2
RC Strasbourg (D2)	5–3	Toulouse FC (D1)	2–1	3–2
Périgueux (D4)	2–8	RC Lens (D1)	0–4	2–4
FC Martigues (D2)	1–2	Stade de Reims (D2)	1–0	0–2
Olympique Alès (D2)	3–2	Tours FC (D2)	3–1	0–1

== Quarter-finals ==
Team 1	Agg.	Team 2	1st leg	2nd leg
RC Lens (D1)	0–1	Olympique de Marseille (D1)	0–1	0–0
Girondins de Bordeaux (D1)	4–3	Lille OSC (D1)	3–1	1–2
Stade Lavallois (D1)	1–1 (3–4 p)	Stade de Reims (D2)	1–0	0–1 (a.e.t.)
Olympique Alès (D2)	2–1	RC Strasbourg (D2)	2–0	0–1

== Semi-finals ==
=== First leg ===
26 May 1987

Alès (2)	2–2	Bordeaux (1)
J. Martinez 70'; Cabanel 85'		Vercruysse 73'; Ferreri 83'

Stade Pierre Pibarot, Alès
Attendance: 17,000
Referee: Gérard Biguet

26 May 1987

Marseille (1)	2–0	Reims (2)
Brisson 41'; Benoît 47'

Stade Vélodrome, Marseille
Attendance: 17,085
Referee: Jean-Marie Lartigot

=== Second leg ===
2 June 1987

Bordeaux (1)	0–0	Alès (2)

Parc Lescure, Bordeaux
Attendance: 20,000
Referee: René Lopez

2–2 on aggregate. Bordeaux won on away goals.

2 June 1987

Reims (2)	1–5	Marseille (1)
Badjika 64' (pen.)		Laurey 2'; Passi 35'; Cubaynes 60'; Genghini 78'; Förster 83'

Stade Auguste Delaune, Reims
Attendance: 28,000
Referee: Robert Wurtz

Marseille won 7–1 on aggregate.

== Final ==
10 June 1987

Bordeaux	2–0	Marseille
Fargeon 14'; Zl. Vujović 88'

Parc des Princes, Paris
Attendance: 45,145
Referee: Michel Vautrot
