= Claude Barrabé =

French footballer (born 1966)

Personal information
- Date of birth: 19 November 1966 (age 59)
- Place of birth: Saint-Pierre, Réunion
- Position: Goalkeeper

Senior career*
Years	Team	Apps	(Gls)
1985–1986	INF Vichy		
1986–1988	Paris Saint-Germain		
1988–1990	Stade Brest		
1990–1995	Montpellier HSC		
1996	SM Caen		
1996–1999	US Créteil-Lusitanos		

International career
- France under-21
- * Club domestic league appearances and goals

Claude Barrabé (born 19 November 1966) is a retired French football goalkeeper.

== Honours ==
=== Player ===
Montpellier

- Coupe de la Ligue: 1991–92
