= 1985–86 French Division 1 =

48th season of French Division 1

Division 1
- Season: 1985–86
- Champions: Paris Saint-Germain (1st title)
- Relegated: Strasbourg; Bastia
- European Cup: Paris Saint-Germain
- Cup Winners' Cup: Bordeaux
- UEFA Cup: Nantes; Toulouse; Lens
- Matches: 380
- Goals: 931 (2.45 per match)
- Top goalscorer: Jules Bocandé (23)

The 1985-86 Division 1 season was the 48th since its establishment. Paris Saint-Germain became champions for the first time in their history with 56 points. During this season the "Boulogne Boys" and "Gavroche" emerged. They were groups of supporters located in the Kop of Boulogne a stand in the Parc des Princes. On 26 July 1985, Paris Saint-Germain took the top spot in the league for the first time in their history after defeating Toulouse 3-1. On 20 September, Les Parisiens recovered from a 2-0 score and claimed a 2-3 victory over Lens. A victory that proved the strength of the current championship leader. On 29 November, Paris recorded a goalless draw against Girondins de Bordeaux, setting a new record of 22 matches without defeat along the way (previously held by Saint-Étienne in the 1957-58 season). The capital club would eventually lose against Lille in the 20th matchday after recording a run of 27 matches without a single defeat. On 11 April 1986, Oumar Sène gave PSG the victory over AS Monaco in stoppage time. Thanks to the victory, the club captained by Luis Fernández was virtually champion of France, with four points ahead of the second and with a better goal difference. The club would become the first club from Paris to win the league since 1936. On 18 April, PSG lost 3-1 against Metz with a surprising ending that saw Paris goalkeeper Joël Bats abandon the pitch injured, leaving his place to Luis Fernández. On 25 April, Paris SG claimed their first league title after easily defeating Bastia 3-1 at the Parc des Princes. After the match, fireworks blazed in the sky celebrating the first championship of the club. On 28 April, the Mayor of Paris, Jacques Chirac, received the champion of France at the Paris City Hall.

== Promotion and relegation ==
Location of teams in 1985–86 Division 1

Teams promoted from 1984–85 Division 2

- Champions: Le Havre
- Runners-up: Nice

Teams relegated to 1985–86 Division 2

- 18th Place: Rouen
- 19th Place: Tours
- 20th Place: Paris

== League table ==
Pos	Team	Pld	W	D	L	GF	GA	GD	Pts	Qualification or relegation
1	Paris Saint-Germain (C)	38	23	10	5	66	33	+33	56	Qualification to European Cup first round
2	Nantes	38	20	13	5	53	27	+26	53	Qualification to UEFA Cup first round
3	Bordeaux	38	18	13	7	55	46	+9	49	Qualification to Cup Winners' Cup first round (Note: Bordeaux qualified for 1986–87 European Cup Winners' Cup as winners of the 1985–86 Coupe de France.)
4	Toulouse	38	18	7	13	59	44	+15	43	Qualification to UEFA Cup first round
5	Lens	38	15	13	10	51	43	+8	43	Qualification to UEFA Cup first round
6	Metz	38	15	12	11	53	34	+19	42	
7	Auxerre	38	16	9	13	45	39	+6	41	
8	Nice	38	14	11	13	39	44	−5	39	
9	Monaco	38	9	19	10	49	42	+7	37	
10	Lille	38	13	10	15	40	49	−9	36	
11	Laval	38	11	13	14	39	47	−8	35	
12	Marseille	38	11	12	15	43	39	+4	34	
13	Rennes	38	12	10	16	36	41	−5	34	
14	Brest	38	13	8	17	53	63	−10	34	
15	Sochaux	38	11	12	15	47	57	−10	34	
16	Toulon	38	9	15	14	43	46	−3	33	
17	Le Havre	38	11	11	16	49	53	−4	33	
18	Nancy (O)	38	13	7	18	45	51	−6	33	Qualification to relegation play-offs
19	Strasbourg (R)	38	10	11	17	36	54	−18	31	Relegation to French Division 2
20	Bastia (R)	38	5	10	23	30	79	−49	20	Relegation to French Division 2

Source: Histoire du PSG
Rules for classification: 1) points; 2) goal difference; 3) number of goals scored.
Victory: 2 points, Draw: 1 point, Defeat: 0 points
(C) Champions; (O) Play-off winners; (R) Relegated

== Results ==
Home \ Away	AUX	BAS	BOR	BRS	LAV	LHA	RCL	LIL	OM	MET	ASM	NAL	FCN	NIC	PSG	REN	SOC	RCS	SCT	TFC
Auxerre		2–0	2–2	1–2	2–0	3–0	0–0	2–0	2–0	2–1	1–0	3–0	0–0	1–2	0–1	1–0	3–2	2–0	0–0	2–1
Bastia	0–0		0–2	3–2	0–0	2–1	0–1	2–0	0–3	0–0	0–0	2–2	2–3	0–1	2–4	0–2	0–0	2–0	2–1	0–2
Bordeaux	0–0	2–2		4–0	2–1	5–3	2–1	1–1	2–1	3–1	5–1	1–0	2–1	1–0	0–0	3–2	1–1	1–0	2–1	1–1
Brest	1–3	7–0	0–1		2–1	1–1	2–0	1–1	2–1	1–1	2–1	0–2	1–3	1–1	1–1	2–1	3–1	2–1	2–1	2–2
Laval	0–0	1–0	0–0	0–0		2–2	2–1	2–2	1–0	1–1	0–0	2–0	0–0	2–1	2–2	1–0	3–1	4–1	2–0	3–2
Le Havre	3–3	5–2	0–1	2–0	1–1		3–0	0–0	1–0	0–0	1–1	2–0	0–1	1–2	1–2	1–0	1–0	4–1	4–3	1–0
Lens	2–1	6–0	1–0	1–0	3–1	4–1		1–4	2–1	0–0	1–1	1–0	0–0	2–0	2–3	0–0	3–1	0–0	1–1	2–0
Lille	0–1	2–2	1–0	3–1	1–3	0–0	1–0		0–0	1–0	2–2	3–1	0–0	1–0	2–0	2–0	2–1	2–0	1–0	2–0
Marseille	2–1	0–0	4–0	3–0	4–0	1–1	3–3	1–0		0–0	2–2	2–3	1–0	2–1	0–0	1–2	1–2	0–1	2–3	1–1
Metz	2–0	3–0	2–3	3–1	2–1	3–0	2–3	4–0	3–0		3–2	3–1	0–0	3–0	3–1	4–1	2–0	0–0	0–2	1–1
Monaco	1–0	2–1	9–0	3–1	1–1	2–2	1–2	3–2	0–0	0–0		1–1	1–1	0–1	1–1	1–0	1–0	2–0	0–2	3–0
Nancy	1–0	4–1	1–1	2–0	1–0	3–0	2–1	3–0	0–2	0–2	1–1		1–3	3–0	1–0	0–0	3–0	1–1	5–3	0–1
Nantes	2–1	2–0	0–0	3–1	1–0	2–1	4–0	5–1	0–2	1–0	1–1	2–0		1–1	2–0	1–0	3–2	2–0	1–1	1–0
Nice	1–1	1–0	1–1	2–2	0–0	0–3	1–1	0–0	1–0	2–0	1–0	3–1	0–0		0–0	2–1	2–0	5–1	2–1	3–1
Paris SG	4–0	3–1	1–0	2–0	5–1	1–0	2–2	3–0	2–0	2–1	1–0	2–0	2–1	3–2		1–0	4–1	1–1	1–0	3–0
Rennes	4–1	3–1	0–0	0–4	1–0	2–1	2–0	2–0	1–2	0–0	0–1	1–0	0–0	2–0	2–3		0–0	1–1	1–0	2–1
Sochaux	2–0	2–0	2–1	4–2	1–0	1–1	1–3	3–1	1–1	1–2	1–1	1–1	1–1	2–0	1–1	0–0		3–1	1–0	4–1
Strasbourg	1–3	6–1	3–2	0–1	2–1	2–1	0–0	2–1	0–0	0–0	1–1	1–0	1–2	2–0	1–0	1–1	3–0		1–1	0–3
Toulon	0–1	1–1	1–1	2–3	3–0	1–0	0–0	1–1	0–0	2–1	1–1	1–0	0–0	4–0	1–1	1–1	2–2	1–0		1–1
Toulouse	2–0	3–1	1–2	2–0	2–0	1–0	1–1	1–0	1–0	2–0	2–1	4–1	4–2	0–0	1–3	4–1	3–0	3–0	4–0	

Legend: Blue = home team win; Yellow = draw; Red = away team win.

== Relegation play-offs ==
Team 1	Agg.	Team 2	1st leg	2nd leg
Nancy	3–2	Mulhouse	3–0	0–2

== Top goalscorers ==
Rank	Player	Club	Goals
1	(Senegal) Jules Bocandé	Metz	23
2	(France) Dominique Rocheteau	Paris Saint-Germain	19
2	(Argentina) Víctor Ramos	Toulon	19
4	(Socialist Federal Republic of Yugoslavia) Vahid Halilhodžić	Nantes	18
5	(Morocco) Abdelkrim Merry Krimau	Le Havre	17
6	(West Germany) Uwe Reinders	Bordeaux	15
7	(France) Gérard Buscher	Brest	14
7	(Algeria) Chérif Oudjani	Laval	14
7	(France) Pascal Marini	Brest	14
10	(France) Bernard Genghini	Monaco	13
10	(France) Bernard Bureau	Lille	13

== Attendances ==
#	Club	Average
1	PSG	24,572
2	Girondins	16,378
3	Marseille	16,378
4	Nantes	14,166
5	Lens	14,095
6	Metz	12,232
7	Toulouse	11,942
8	Stade rennais	11,267
9	Nice	9,963
10	Le Havre	9,379
11	LOSC	8,159
12	Toulon	7,955
13	Nancy	7,515
14	Stade lavallois	7,308
15	Strasbourg	7,176
16	AJA	7,124
17	Stade brestois	6,984
18	Monaco	5,161
19	Sochaux	3,845
20	Bastia	1,530
