= Fabrice Poullain =

French footballer (born 1962)

Personal information
- Date of birth: 27 August 1962 (age 64)
- Place of birth: Alençon, France
- Position: Midfielder

Senior career*
Years	Team	Apps	(Gls)
1980–1985	Nantes		
1985–1988	Paris Saint-Germain		
1988–1990	Monaco		
1990–1992	Nice		

International career
1985–1988	France	10	(0)
- * Club domestic league appearances and goals

Fabrice Poullain (born 27 August 1962) is a French former professional footballer who played as a midfielder.
