= Omar da Fonseca =

Argentine footballer

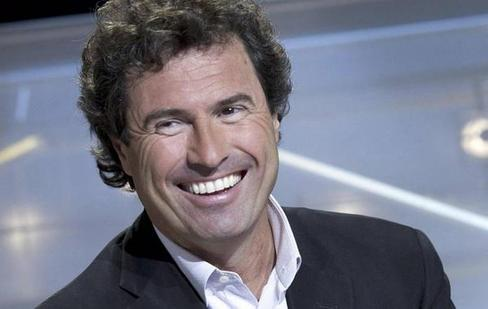
- Da Fonseca in 2016

Personal information
- Date of birth: 20 October 1959 (age 67)
- Place of birth: Buenos Aires, Argentina
- Position: Forward

Senior career*
Years	Team	Apps	(Gls)
1978–1981	Vélez Sársfield	45	(2)
1981	Belgrano	10	(1)
1982	Renato Cesarini	13	(9)
1982–1985	Tours	97	(41)
1985–1986	Paris Saint-Germain	17	(2)
1986–1988	Monaco	52	(10)
1988–1990	Toulouse	38	(4)
1990–1993	Paris FC	40	(12)
- * Club domestic league appearances and goals

Omar da Fonseca (born 20 October 1959) is an Argentine football commentator and former player.

== Personal life ==
Born in Argentina, da Fonseca is a naturalized citizen of France.
