= Philippe Desmet =

Belgian footballer

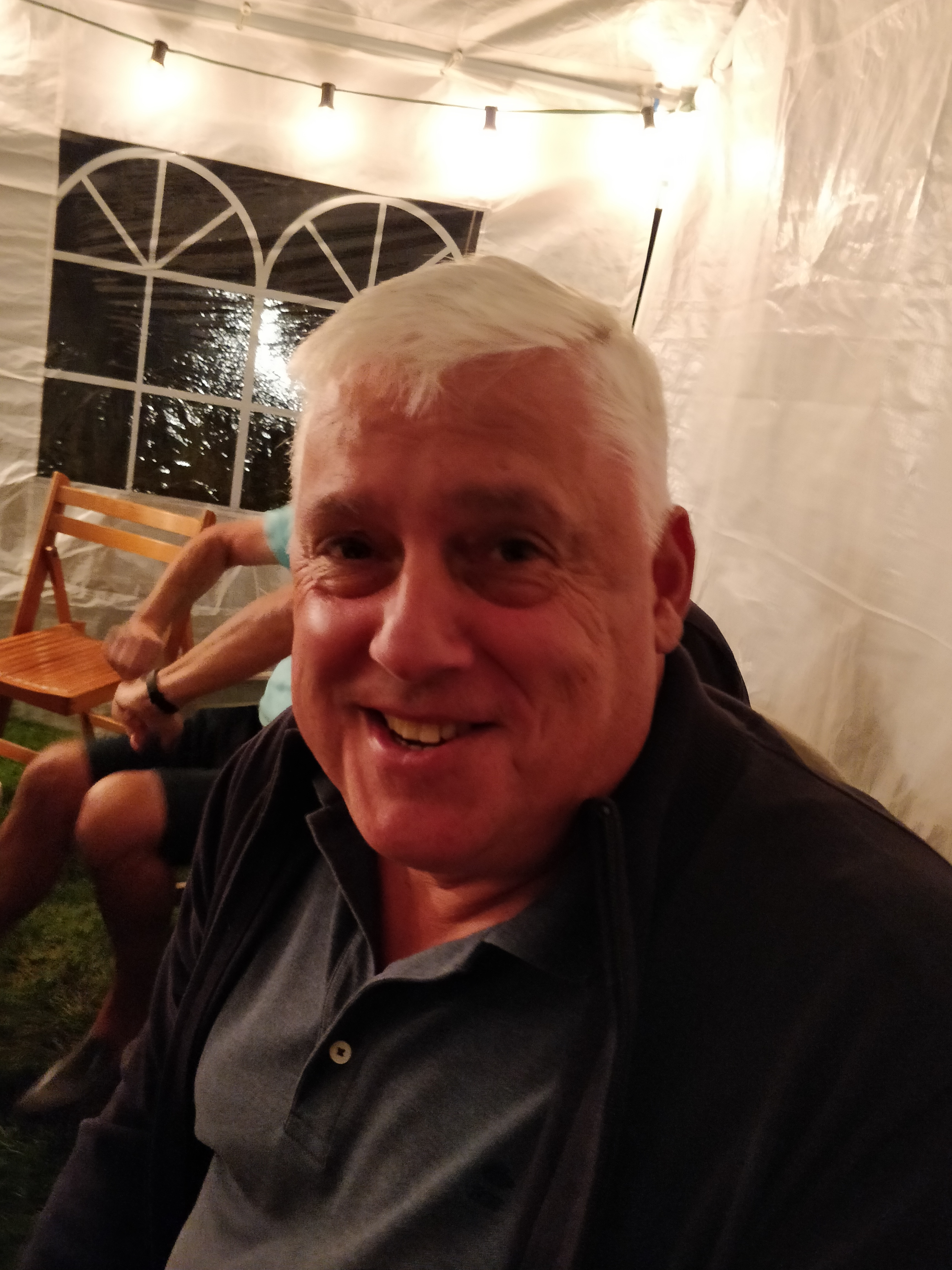
- wikiportret.nl 2018

Personal information
- Date of birth: 29 November 1958 (age 67)
- Place of birth: Waregem, Belgium
- Height: 1.81 m (5 ft 11 1/2 in)
- Position: Midfielder

Senior career*
Years	Team	Apps	(Gls)
1977–1986	K.S.V. Waregem	233	(45)
1986–1989	Lille OSC	90	(27)
1989–1991	K.V. Kortrijk	23	(3)
1991	R. Charleroi S.C.	10	(1)
1991–1992	Eendracht Aalst	2	(0)
Total		358	(76)

International career
1985–1987	Belgium	14	(1)
- * Club domestic league appearances and goals

Philippe Desmet (born 29 November 1958) is a retired Belgian international footballer.

== Honours ==
=== International ===
Belgium

- FIFA World Cup: 1986 (fourth place)
