= 1990–91 Coupe de France =

Tournament details
- Country: France

Final positions
- Champions: Monaco
- Runners-up: Marseille

Tournament statistics
- Top goal scorer(s): Jean-Pierre Papin (7 goals)

The 1990–91 Coupe de France was the 74th Coupe de France, France's annual national football cup competition. It was won by AS Monaco.

== Round of 64 ==
Team 1	Score	Team 2
Mulhouse (D2)	0–1	Nantes (D1)
Cannes (D1)	2–1 (a.e.t.)	Orléans (D2)
Niort (D2)	1–0	Caen (D1)
Bourges (D2)	1–0	Bordeaux (D1)
Rouen (D2)	1–0	Rennes (D1)
Angers (D2)	2-0	Lyon (D1)
Saint-Quentin (D2)	0–2	Auxerre (D1)
Dunkerque (D2)	2–3	Nancy (D1)
Avignon (D2)	0–4	Toulon (D1)
Monaco (D1)	1–0	Saint-Seurin (D2)
Toulouse (D1)	3–1	Bastia (D2)
Marseille (D1)	4–1	Strasbourg (D2)
Lille (D1)	4–2	Épinal (D2)
Dijon (D2)	3–1	Nice (D1)
Mont-de-Marsan (D3)	2–3	Metz (D1)
Wasquehal (D3)	0–1	Paris Saint-Germain (D1)
Avranches (D3)	1–2	Sochaux (D1)
Vénissieux (DHR)	0–2 (a.e.t.)	Brest (D1)
Mandelieu (District)	0–6	Saint-Étienne (D1)
Red Star (D2)	1–2	Tours (D2)
Istres (D2)	0–1	Rodez (D2)
Gueugnon (D2)	1–1 (a.e.t.) (7–6 p)	Chaumont (D2)
Melun (D3)	1–2 (a.e.t.)	Beauvais (D2)
Brive (D3)	0–2 (a.e.t.)	Alès (D2)
Troyes (D3)	1–2	Annecy (D2)
Stade Briochin (D4)	2–2 (a.e.t.) (4–5 p)	Laval (D2)
Arles (D4)	0–3	Gazélec Ajaccio (D2)
Rochefort (DH)	0–3	Valenciennes (D2)
Plabennec (DH)	1–4	Le Mans (D2)
Fécamp (D3)	1–1 (a.e.t.) (5–3 p)	Amiens (D3)
LSC Châteauroux (D4)	3–1	Saint-Priest (D3)
Montagnarde (D3)	0–2	Montpellier (D1)

== Round of 32 ==
Team 1	Score	Team 2
Auxerre	1–0	Saint-Étienne (D1)
Lille (D1)	1–3	Monaco (D1)
Montpellier (D1)	0–1	Niort (D2)
Annecy (D2)	1–0 (a.e.t.)	Nancy (D1)
Rodez (D2)	1–1 (a.e.t.) (4–3 p)	Metz (D1)
Tours (D2)	1–0	Toulouse (D1)
Paris Saint-Germain (D1)	1–0	Bourges (D2)
Dijon (D2)	0–3	Marseille (D1)
Beauvais (D2)	0–3	Brest (D1)
Cannes (D1)	3–0	Valenciennes (D2)
Sochaux (D1)	2–1 (a.e.t.)	Angers (D2)
Fécamp (D3)	1–1 (a.e.t.) (3–4 p)	Nantes (D1)
LSC Châteauroux (D4)	0–1 (a.e.t.)	Toulon (D1)
Alès (D2)	0–0 (a.e.t.) (4–1 p)	Gueugnon (D2)
Gazélec Ajaccio (D2)	2–0	Rouen (D2)
Le Mans (D2)	1–2 (a.e.t.)	Laval (D2)

== Round of 16 ==
Team 1	Score	Team 2
Nantes (D1)	2–1	Brest (D1)
Toulon (D1)	2–3	Monaco (D1)
Sochaux (D1)	1–1 (a.e.t.) (9–8 p)	Auxerre (D1)
Paris Saint-Germain (D1)	0–2	Marseille (D1)
Gazélec Ajaccio (D2)	0–1	Cannes (D1)
Tours (D2)	0–1	Gueugnon (D2)
Niort (D2)	2–1	Laval (D2)
Rodez (D2)	2–0	Annecy (D2)

== Quarter-finals ==
14 May 1991	Gueugnon (2)	1–0	Niort (2)	Gueugnon
	Colombo 47'			Stadium: Stade Jean Laville; Attendance: 4,800; Referee: Michel Girard

14 May 1991	Nantes (1)	1–2 (a.e.t.)	Marseille (1)	Nantes
	Le Guen 77'		Papin 81'; Boli 104'	Stadium: Stade de la Beaujoire; Attendance: 33,612; Referee: Claude Bouillet

14 May 1991	Rodez (2)	2–1	Sochaux (1)	Rodez
	Bobeck 32'; Krstić 60'		Madar 85'	Stadium: Stade Paul Lignon; Attendance: 9,834; Referee: Alain Delmer

14 May 1991	Cannes (1)	1–2	Monaco (1)	Cannes
	Durix 11'		Weah 19'; Sassus 42' (o.g.)	Stadium: Stade Pierre de Coubertin; Attendance: 9,000; Referee: Philippe Leduc

== Semi-finals ==
31 May 1991	Monaco (1)	5–0	Gueugnon (2)	Monaco
	Weah 21', 37'; Djorkaeff 60'; Passi 70'; Sauzée 76'			Stadium: Stade Louis II; Attendance: 5,000; Referee: Gérard Biguet

2 June 1991	Marseille (1)	4–1	Rodez (2)	Marseille
	Papin 19', 22', 32'; Vercruysse 58'		Pradier 79'	Stadium: Stade Vélodrome; Attendance: 29,022; Referee: Marcel Lainé

== Final ==
8 June 1991
20:00

Monaco	1–0	Marseille
Passi 90'

Parc des Princes, Paris
Attendance: 44,123
Referee: Joël Quiniou

== Topscorer ==
Jean-Pierre Papin (7 goals)
