= Joël Bats =

French footballer (born 1957)

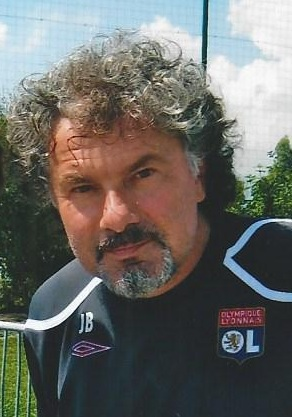
- Bats with Lyon in 2008

Personal information
- Date of birth: 4 January 1957 (age 69)
- Place of birth: Mont-de-Marsan, France
- Height: 1.78 m (5 ft 10 in)
- Position: Goalkeeper

Youth career
- Sochaux

Senior career*
Years	Team	Apps	(Gls)
1974–1976	Sochaux B		
1976–1980	Sochaux	66	(0)
1980–1985	Auxerre	184	(0)
1985–1992	Paris Saint-Germain	254	(0)

International career
1983–1989	France	50	(0)

Managerial career
- 1996–1998: Paris Saint-Germain
- 1998–1999: Châteauroux
- 2000–2017: Lyon (goalkeeping coach)
Medal record
Representing France
FIFA World Cup
Third place	1986
UEFA European Championship
Winner	1984
CONMEBOL–UEFA Cup of Champions
Winner	1985
- * Club domestic league appearances and goals

Joël Bats (born 4 January 1957) is a French former professional footballer who played as a goalkeeper. He spent his entire senior club career in his native France, appearing in a total of 553 competitive club matches and 504 Division 1 matches for Sochaux, Auxerre and Paris Saint-Germain from 1976 to 1992. He made 50 appearances, 35 competitive matches and 15 friendly matches, for the France national team.

== Club career ==
=== Sochaux ===
Bats joined the youth academy of FC Sochaux-Montbéliard. He played for Sochaux's U19 youth team until the summer of 1974. He began his Sochaux professional career at the start of the 1974–75 season. Bats spent the 1974–75 and 1975–76 seasons playing only for the club's reserve team. After Bats was promoted to the club's first team in the summer of 1976, he had to compete with Albert Rust for playing time over the next four seasons, with the two of them being alternated in matches. Bats stayed at Sochaux until the end of the 1979–80 season.

=== Auxerre ===
In the summer of 1980, Bats joined AJ Auxerre, which would make its Division 1 debut in the 1980–81 season after having earned promotion to Division 1 by winning the 1979–80 French Division 2 title. He became the undisputed first-choice goalkeeper during each of his five seasons at Auxerre.

=== Paris Saint-Germain ===
In the summer of 1985, Bats joined Paris Saint-Germain. PSG won their first Division 1/Ligue 1 title in 1986. Bats was PSG's first-choice goalkeeper during each of his seven seasons there. He played 286 competitive matches for PSG until his retirement at the end of the 1991–92 season.

== International career ==
On 7 September 1983, Bats made his debut for the senior France team in a 3–1 friendly away loss to Denmark.

Bats was selected to represent France for the 1984 European Championship finals, which France hosted and won. He played every minute of France's five matches at that tournament. It was in the semi-finals that Bats truly shone, making a pair of superb saves in the 3–2 extra-time win over Portugal before France beat Spain 2–0 in the final to lift the Henri Delaunay Trophy and win their first major international title. By the end of that tournament, Bats was recognized as a safe, authoritative presence in goal. He would remain as the first-choice goalkeeper for France until his international retirement in 1989.

Bats played all 8 of the 1986 World Cup qualifying matches and France finished at the top of its UEFA qualifying group. During the 1986 FIFA World Cup finals, he played every minute of France's three group stage matches, round of 16, quarter-final and semi-final matches. In that tournament, he famously saved a penalty from Zico in the second half of normal time and another penalty from Sócrates in the penalty shoot-out during the quarter-final against Brazil. However, he uncharacteristically let a free-kick from Andreas Brehme slip through his hands in the semi-final against West Germany, which France lost 2–0.

Bats played seven out of the eight 1988 European Championship qualifying matches and all eight of the 1990 World Cup qualifying matches. France did not qualify for the finals of both of those tournaments. Bats became the first goalkeeper to make his 50th appearance for the senior France team when he was in the starting lineup of the 2–0 1990 World Cup qualifying home win over Cyprus on 18 November 1989; he played every minute of that match and it was also his final appearance for France.

== Coaching career ==
=== Paris Saint-Germain ===
Bats was a member of the Paris Saint-Germain coaching staff, first as Artur Jorge's goalkeeping coach (1992–1994) and then as Luis Fernández's assistant coach (1994–1996). Bats was appointed joint head coach of PSG with Ricardo Gomes in June 1996. PSG won the 1997–98 Coupe de France and the 1997–98 Coupe de la Ligue but a disappointing 1997–98 French Division 1 season and a series of boardroom changes saw Bats and Gomes replaced in June 1998 by Alain Giresse.

=== Châteauroux ===
Bats had a brief, undistinguished spell as head coach (July 1998 - September 1999) of Division 2 club L.B. Châteauroux. During his 15-month-long spell, Châteauroux won only 32% of their competitive matches.

=== Lyon ===
In the summer of 2000, Bats was appointed goalkeeping coach at Olympique Lyonnais, a post that he held continuously until December 2017. During his 17 years at OL, he coached three goalkeepers who played for their countries at the senior level - Grégory Coupet, Hugo Lloris and Anthony Lopes. Bats had been under contract at OL until 2019 but the club allowed him to leave early so that he could join up with former OL head coach Rémi Garde at Major League Soccer club Montreal Impact.

== Personal life ==
Bats was diagnosed with testicular cancer in the summer of 1982, but quickly made a full recovery after surgery. As therapy during his convalescence, he took up writing poetry, and had two volumes of it published.

In 1986, Bats put his poetry to music, releasing an album named Gardien de tes Nuits (Keeper of your Nights). Later in the same year, he released three singles - a children's song (converted from a poem) named L'Escargot (The Snail), a plaintive ballad named Soli Solitude and Même si je m’envole (Even if I am flying).

== Honours ==
Paris Saint-Germain

- Division 1: 1985–86

France

- UEFA European Championship: 1984
- Artemio Franchi Cup: 1985

Individual

- Onze Mondial: 1985, 1986, 1989
