= Didier Deschamps =

French footballer and manager (born 1968)

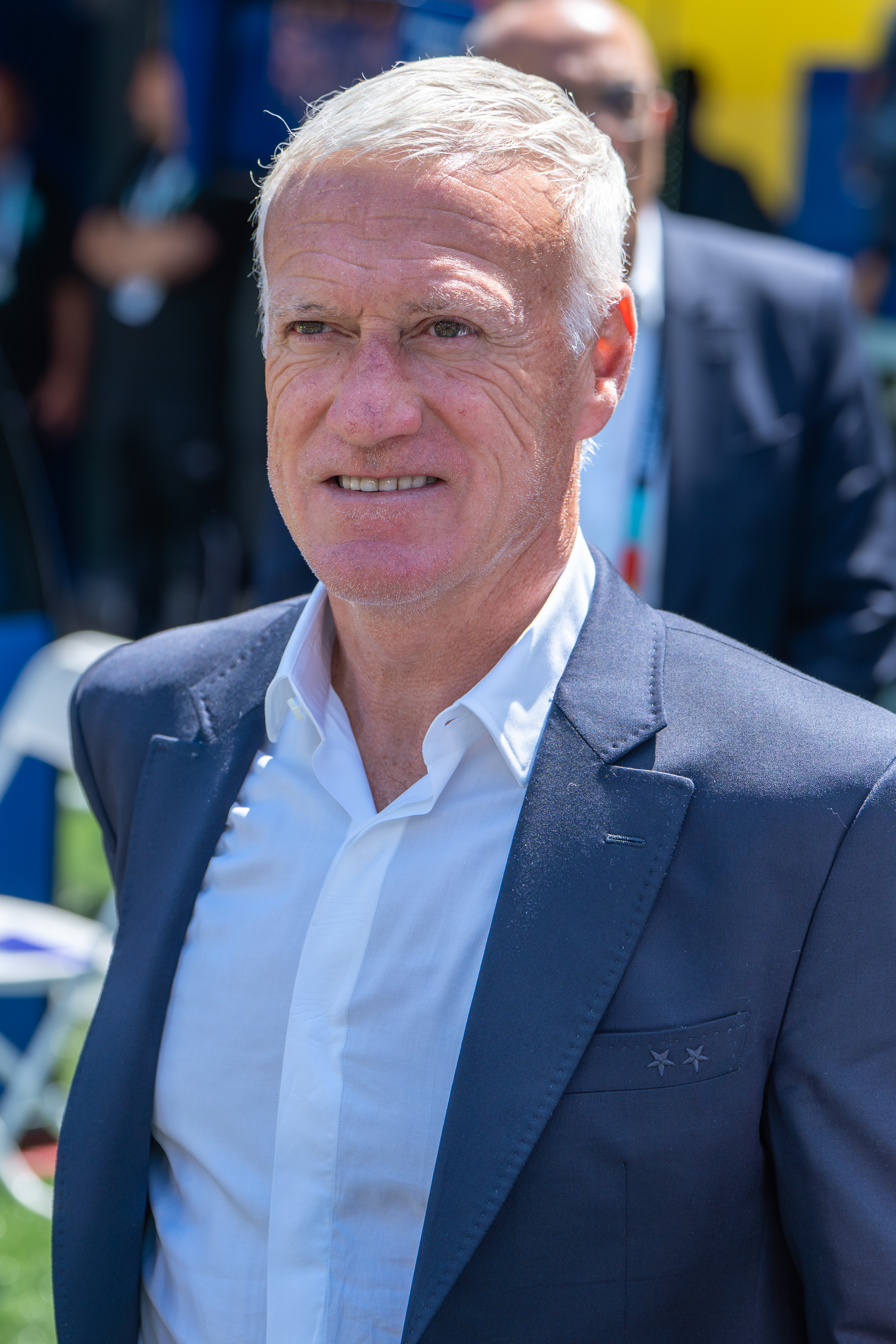
- Deschamps in 2026

Personal information
- Full name: Didier Claude Deschamps
- Date of birth: 15 October 1968 (age 58)
- Place of birth: Bayonne, France
- Height: 1.74 m (5 ft 9 in)
- Position: Defensive midfielder

Youth career
- 1976–1983: Bayonne
- 1983–1985: Nantes

Senior career*
Years	Team	Apps	(Gls)
1985–1989	Nantes	111	(4)
1989–1994	Marseille	123	(6)
1990–1991	→ Bordeaux (loan)	29	(3)
1994–1999	Juventus	124	(4)
1999–2000	Chelsea	27	(0)
2000–2001	Valencia	14	(0)
Total		427	(17)

International career
1989–2000	France	103	(4)

Managerial career
- 2001–2005: Monaco
- 2006–2007: Juventus
- 2009–2012: Marseille
- 2012–2026: France
Medal record
Men's football
Representing France (as player)
FIFA World Cup
Winner	1998 France
UEFA European Championship
Winner	2000 Belgium/Netherlands
Representing France (as manager)
FIFA World Cup
Winner	2018 Russia
Runner-up	2022 Qatar
UEFA European Championship
Runner-up	2016 France
UEFA Nations League
Winner	2021 Italy
Third place	2025 Germany
- * Club domestic league appearances and goals

Didier Claude Deschamps (French: [didje klod deʃɑ̃]; born 15 October 1968), popularly known as Dédé ([dede]), is a French professional football manager and former player. He played as a defensive midfielder for several clubs in France, Italy, England and Spain, namely Marseille, Juventus, Chelsea and Valencia, as well as Nantes and Bordeaux. Nicknamed "The Water-Carrier" (French: le porteur d'eau), Deschamps was known for his intelligence, work rate, ability to regain possession and initiate attacking plays, as well as his leadership on the pitch. As a French international, he was capped on 103 occasions and took part in three UEFA European Championships and one FIFA World Cup, captaining his nation to victories in the 1998 World Cup and Euro 2000.

In addition to winning two Division 1 titles in 1990 and 1992, Deschamps was part of the Marseille squad that became the first French club to win the UEFA Champions League, a feat the team achieved in 1993; with the Champions League victory, Deschamps became the youngest captain ever to lead his team to win the title. With Juventus he played in three Champions League finals in a row from 1996 to 1998, winning the title in 1996. With the Turin side, he also won the UEFA Super Cup and the Intercontinental Cup, as well as three Serie A titles, among other trophies. With Chelsea, he won the 1999–2000 FA Cup, and also reached another Champions League final with Valencia in 2001, before retiring later that season. After Franz Beckenbauer and followed by Iker Casillas, he was only the second captain in the history of football to have lifted the Champions League trophy, the World Cup trophy, and the European Championship trophy.

As a manager, Deschamps began his career with Monaco, and helped the club win the Coupe de la Ligue in 2003, and reached the 2004 UEFA Champions League final, being named Ligue 1 Manager of the Year in 2004. In 2004, Deschamps became the youngest manager to reach a UEFA Champions League final, aged 35, after leading Monaco to the 2004 final. Monaco were defeated 3–0 by Porto in the final. During the 2006–07 season, he helped his former club Juventus win the Serie B title and return to Serie A following their relegation due to their involvement in the Calciopoli scandal the previous season. He subsequently managed another one of his former clubs, Marseille, where he won the Ligue 1 title during the 2009–10 season, as well as three consecutive Coupe de la Ligue titles between 2010 and 2012, and consecutive Trophée des Champions titles in 2010 and 2011.

On 8 July 2012, Deschamps was named manager of the France national team. He led the team to the quarter-finals of the 2014 FIFA World Cup, the final of UEFA Euro 2016, victory in the 2018 FIFA World Cup, victory in the 2020–21 UEFA Nations League, a back-to-back final appearance in the 2022 FIFA World Cup, and to the semi-finals of UEFA Euro 2024, third place at the 2024–25 UEFA Nations League, and fourth place at the 2026 FIFA World Cup. Upon winning the World Cup in 2018, Deschamps became the third man to win the World Cup as both a player and a manager, alongside Mário Zagallo and Franz Beckenbauer—both of whom died in 2024, leaving Deschamps the only living man to have reached the milestone. Deschamps follows Beckenbauer as only the second to do so as captain.

== Club career ==
Deschamps was born in Bayonne, Pyrénées-Atlantiques, in the French part of the Basque Country. After a short passage at rugby in the Biarritz Olympique club, Deschamps started his football career at an amateur club, Aviron Bayonnais, while still at school. His potential was spotted by scouts from Nantes, for whom he signed in April 1983. Deschamps made his league debut on 27 September 1985. He transferred to Marseille in 1989. Deschamps then spent a season on loan with Bordeaux in 1990, before returning to Marseille. In this second spell with Marseille, Deschamps gained his first honours as a professional player, winning two Division 1 titles in 1991 and 1992, and was a member of the first French side to win the Champions League in 1993, becoming the youngest captain ever to lift the trophy in the process.

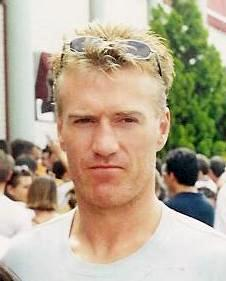
Deschamps in 2000

In 1994, Deschamps joined Italian club Juventus, with whom he won three Serie A titles, one Coppa Italia, two Supercoppa Italiana, as well as his second Champions League title, a UEFA Super Cup, and an Intercontinental Cup in 1996. He also reached two more Champions League finals in his next two seasons, and a UEFA Cup final in 1995. After his spell with Juventus, Deschamps spent a season in England with Chelsea, winning the FA Cup, and scoring once against Hertha BSC in the Champions League. He finished his playing career in Spain, spending a season with Valencia, helping them to the 2001 UEFA Champions League final, but remained on the bench as they lost to Bayern Munich. He then retired in the middle of 2001, at 32 years old.

== International career ==
Receiving his first international call-up from Michel Platini on 29 April 1989 against Yugoslavia, Deschamps started his international career in what was a dark time for the France national team as they failed to qualify for the World Cup in both 1990 and 1994, also suffering a first-round elimination at UEFA Euro 1992.

When new team coach Aimé Jacquet began to rebuild the team for Euro 96, he initially selected Manchester United star Eric Cantona as captain. After Cantona earned a year-long suspension in January 1995, the make-up of the team changed dramatically, with veterans Cantona, Jean-Pierre Papin, and David Ginola being dropped in favour of younger players such as Zinedine Zidane. Deschamps, as one of the few remaining veterans, was chosen to lead what would later be called the "Golden Generation". He first captained France in 1996 in a friendly match against Germany as a warm-up for Euro 96. During that tournament, held in England, he led them all the way to the semi-finals, their best finish in an international tournament since the 1986 World Cup.

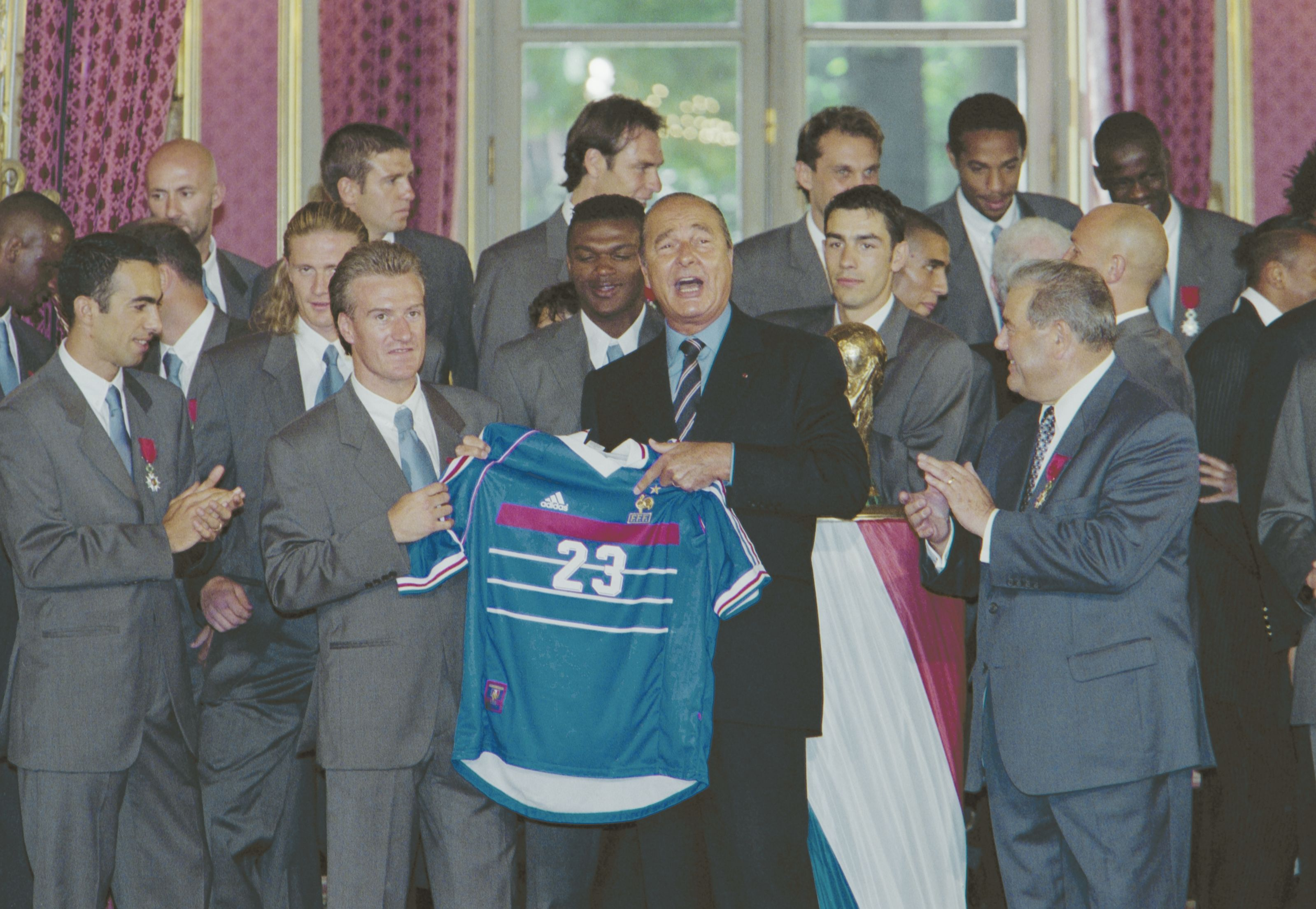
Deschamps (second from left) with President Jacques Chirac at the Élysée Palace following France winning the 1998 World Cup

In 1998, Deschamps captained France as they won the 1998 World Cup on home soil in Paris, holding an integral role in the team. Propelled by the momentum of this triumph, Deschamps also captained France as they won Euro 2000, giving them the distinction of being the first national team to hold both the World Cup and Euro titles since West Germany did so in 1974, a feat emulated twice by the Spain national team between 2010 and 2014, and between 2024 and 2026. Following the tournament, Deschamps announced his retirement from international football, making his second-to-last appearance in a ceremonial match against a FIFA XI in August 2000, which resulted in a 5–1 victory. His final appearance was against England. At the time of his retirement Deschamps held the record for the most appearances for France, though this has since been surpassed by Hugo Lloris, Zinedine Zidane, Lilian Thuram, Marcel Desailly, Olivier Giroud, Antoine Griezmann, Patrick Vieira and Thierry Henry. In total, Deschamps earned 103 caps and scored four goals.

Deschamps was named by Pelé as one of the top 125 greatest living footballers in March 2004.

== Style of play ==
In his position, Deschamps primarily excelled at impeding the opposition's attacking movements as a defensive midfielder, and so was capable of starting up attacking plays and distributing the ball to teammates once he won back possession, leading to him being derisively nicknamed "the water-carrier" by former France teammate Eric Cantona, who implied that Deschamps's primary contribution to the national team was to retrieve the ball and pass it forward to "more talented" players. Deschamps's ability to perform this role was made possible due to his high work-rate, tenacity, stamina, vision, reliable distribution and technique, and his efficacy at pressing and tackling opponents. He also had an excellent positional and organisational sense, and was known for his tactical intelligence, versatility, and his leadership as a footballer.

== Managerial career ==
=== Monaco ===
After retiring as a player, he went into football management. He was appointed head coach of Monaco in France's Ligue 1, leading the club to the Coupe de la Ligue title in 2003 and to its first UEFA Champions League final in 2004. He resigned on 19 September 2005 after a poor start to the season, and disagreement with the club's president.

=== Juventus ===
On 10 July 2006, Deschamps was named head coach of Juventus, after Fabio Capello resigned in the wake of the Calciopoli scandal. Deschamps' first game in charge of Juventus was highly successful, as Juventus beat Alessandria 8–0 in a friendly, but poor results followed as Juventus were knocked out in the third round of the Coppa Italia and then drew 1–1 against Rimini on the first day of the league season. In the following three matches, Juventus beat Vicenza 2–1, Crotone 3–0 and Modena 4–0. Deschamps also helped Juventus to win their first competition since being relegated, which was the Birra Moretti Cup in which Juventus beat Internazionale 1–0 and Napoli in a penalty shoot-out. He led Juventus to its return to Serie A, which was confirmed on 19 May 2007 with a 5–1 away win at Arezzo. On 26 May, several media announced Deschamps had resigned as Juventus manager, following several clashes with the club management. However, this was denied by the club itself a few hours later. Later that evening, after the game against Mantova, which confirmed Juve as Serie B champions, Deschamps confirmed to the media that he had indeed resigned and the news was then made official by Juventus a few hours later.

=== Marseille ===
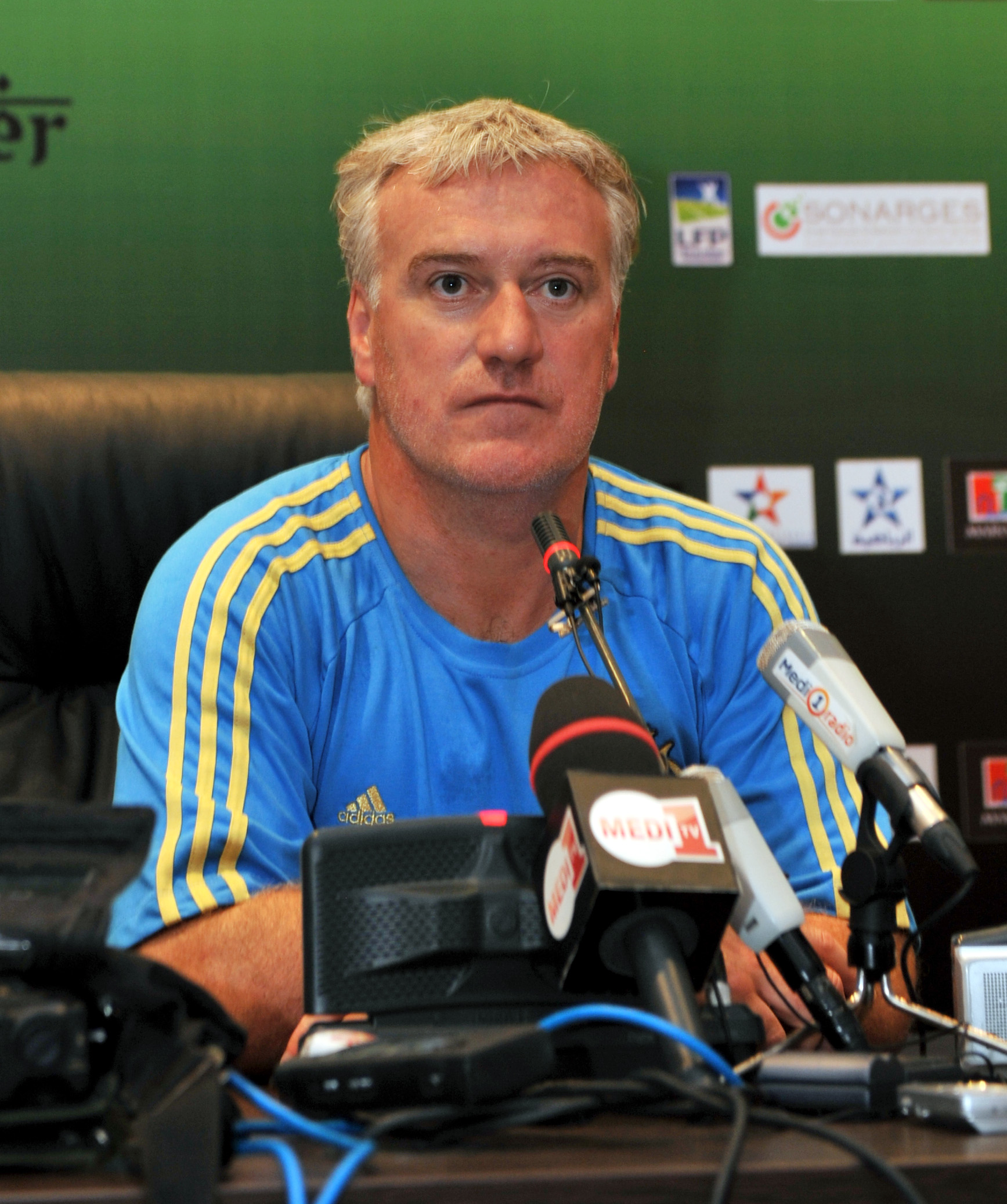
Deschamps as Marseille manager in 2011

On 5 May 2009, it was announced that Deschamps would be named manager of Marseille for the upcoming season which began on 1 July 2009. In his first season, he managed them to their first Ligue 1 title in 18 years. His success had seen the Marseille manager linked to a return to Juventus, whose former president Giovanni Cobolli Gigli urged the club to bring back Deschamps to replace Ciro Ferrara. Ferrara was eventually replaced by Alberto Zaccheroni. On 29 June 2010, Deschamps signed a contract extension that would keep him at Marseille until June 2012. On 6 June 2011, he extended his contract again, this time until June 2014. On 13 March 2012, his Marseille side progressed to the Champions League quarter-finals for the first time since 1993 by beating Inter Milan. On 14 April 2012, Marseille won the Coupe de la Ligue for third time in a row after they beat Lyon 1–0 with Brandão scoring in extra-time. The victory also ended a winless run of 12 matches in all competitions. Deschamps was delighted with Marseille's Coupe de la Ligue triumph and added: "All title wins are beautiful, as they are difficult to achieve. This is the sixth in three years. For a club that had not won anything for 17 years, it is something to be proud of. The credit goes mostly to the players, but I also want to associate my staff with the victory. This is a great source of pride for me, even if it does not change the fact it has been a difficult season in Ligue 1." On 2 July 2012, Deschamps left the club by mutual agreement, citing their poor finish of tenth place in 2011–12.

=== France ===
On 8 July 2012, Deschamps was appointed as head coach of the France national football team on a two-year contract, following in the footsteps of France teammate Laurent Blanc, who resigned after the UEFA Euro 2012 tournament.

France was placed in UEFA Group I for the qualification phase of the 2014 FIFA World Cup. UEFA Group I contained the defending world champions Spain, plus Belarus, Finland and Georgia. In that group, France earned a 1–1 draw away in the first match against Spain but lost 1–0 at home against the same opponents in the second match. After the 1–0 defeat by Spain, France failed to score a single goal in its next four matches – against Uruguay (friendly, 1–0), Brazil (friendly, 3–0), Belgium (friendly, 0–0) and Georgia (Group I qualifying match, 0–0). France finished second in the group, three points behind Spain, and thus had to win the two-legged play-off tie against Ukraine to advance to the final phase of the tournament. In the first leg held in Kyiv, France was beaten 2–0 by Ukraine. Coming into the second leg, Ukraine had kept eight consecutive clean sheets and had not lost their last 12 matches. In the second leg held at the Stade de France, France beat Ukraine 3–0 to win the tie 3–2 on aggregate. France thus qualified for the final phase of the FIFA World Cup for the fifth consecutive time. At the 2014 FIFA World Cup in Brazil, Deschamps's team advanced to the quarter-finals where they lost 1–0 to eventual champions Germany, and Paul Pogba was named Best Young Player of the tournament.

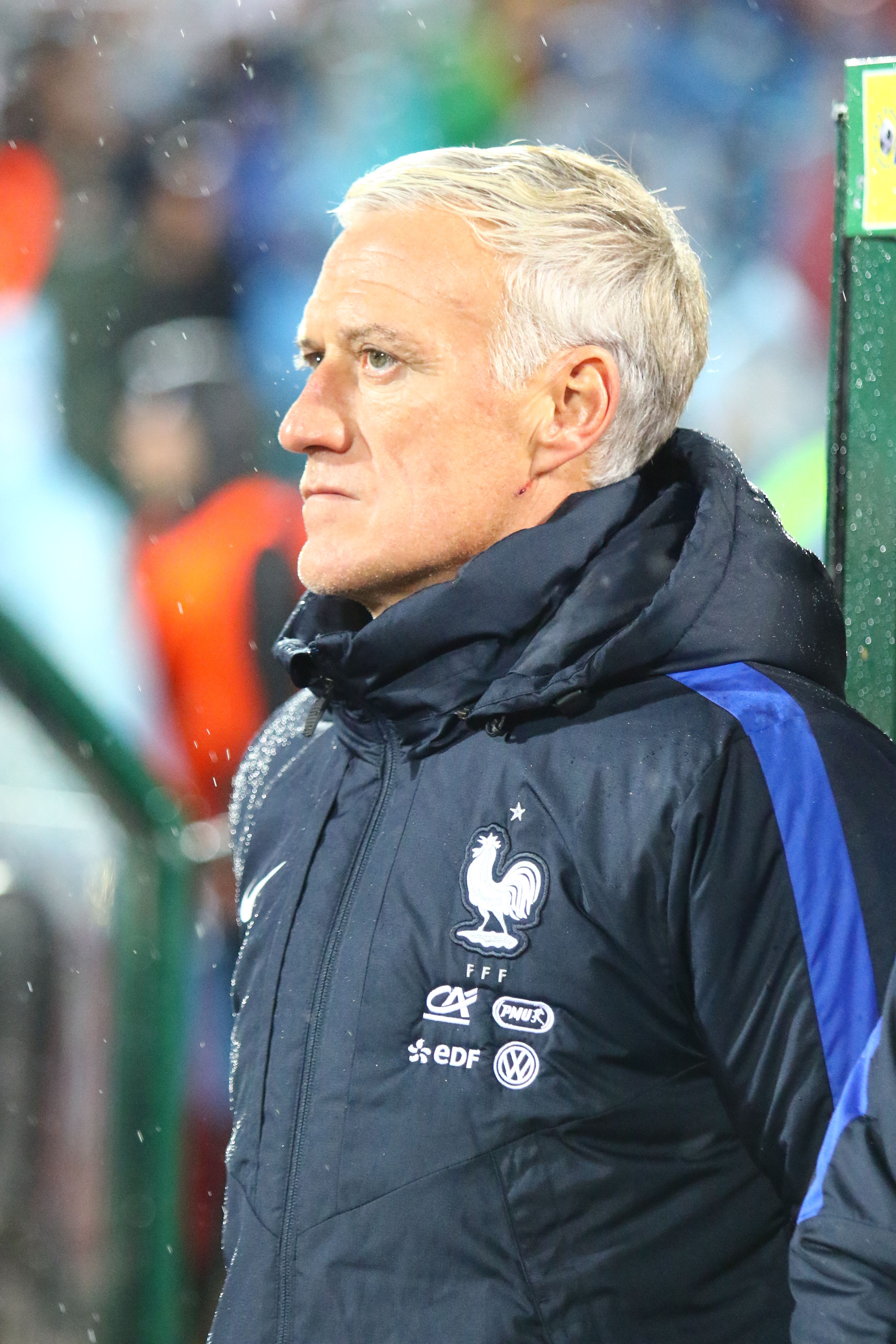
Deschamps as France manager in 2017

On 20 November 2013, Deschamps extended his contract to coach the France national team until the UEFA Euro 2016. The extension was triggered under the terms of an agreement reached with the French Football Federation (FFF) when Deschamps replaced Laurent Blanc after the UEFA Euro 2012, whereby qualification for the 2014 FIFA World Cup would earn Deschamps the right to lead France until the Euro 2016 to be held in France.

At Euro 2016, Deschamps led France to the final on 7 July after a brace from Antoine Griezmann helped defeat Germany 2–0. In the final, France were defeated 1–0 after extra time by Portugal. On 31 October 2017, Deschamps signed a new contract until 2020.

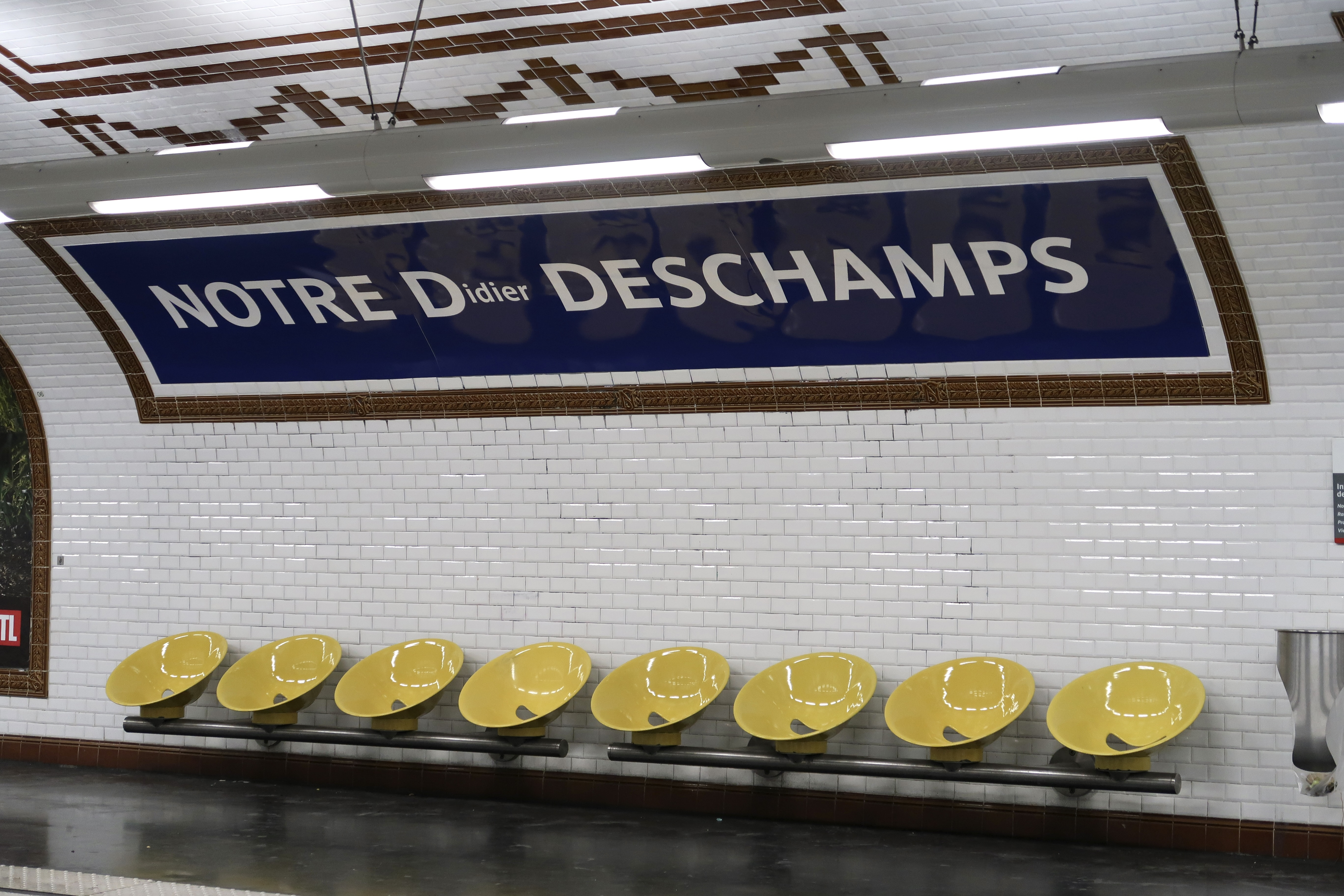
Notre-Dame-des-Champs station of the Paris Métro humorously renamed "Notre Didier Deschamps" ("Our Didier Deschamps") after France winning the 2018 World Cup

For the 2018 FIFA World Cup, Deschamps "was careful in selecting his 23-man roster for Russia, selecting only players who he felt could gel as a cohesive unit", resulting in the omission of Real Madrid's Karim Benzema. Although initially criticized for conservative tactics as the national team had indifferent showings to advance from the group stage with narrow wins over Australia and Peru and a draw against Denmark, they put in dominant performances during the knockout rounds, defeating Argentina 4–3 in the round of 16, and Uruguay 2–0 in the quarter-finals to reach the semi-finals. Following these matches, France became World Cup winners after beating Belgium 1–0 in the semi-final and Croatia 4–2 in the final. As such, Deschamps became only the third man after Mário Zagallo and Franz Beckenbauer to win the World Cup as both a player and a manager, and only the second captain after Beckenbauer to do so.

In December 2019, Deschamps signed a new contract with France, keeping him with the national team until World Cup 2022. At the Euro 2020, France were knocked out on penalties by Switzerland in the round of 16, following a 3–3 draw. Deschamps was criticized for getting his team selections and tactics wrong. In the 2022 World Cup, he led France to reach their second final in a row, which they lost 4–2 on penalties to Argentina after a 3–3 draw. In January 2023, he extended his contract with France until June 2026. France secured their place in UEFA Euro 2024 by finishing at the top of their qualifying group, achieving seven wins and one draw. In one of the matches, France beat Gibraltar 14–0, marking the largest victory in their history. France began the competition well with a 1–0 win over Austria. However, their captain Kylian Mbappé sustained a broken nose during the match. They made it to the semi-finals before losing to eventual champions Spain.

In January 2025, Deschamps announced that he would not extend his contract when it expires after the 2026 FIFA World Cup. At the 2026 World Cup, he became only the third manager to coach the same national team at four consecutive tournaments, after Walter Winterbottom and Helmut Schön. In France's second group-stage victory over Iraq, he equaled the tally of Helmut Schön with 16 World Cup matches won. He had to miss the third group-stage match against Norway after returning home due to the death of his mother. After a 2–0 victory over Morocco in the 2026 World Cup quarter-finals, he earned his 20th World Cup win for France, becoming the first manager to oversee 20 victories at the tournament. The match also marked his 25th World Cup match in charge overall, equaling the record held by Helmut Schön. In the semi-finals against Spain, his side suffered a 2–0 defeat. Deschamps' final game as France head coach ended in a 6–4 defeat to England in the third-place match.

== Style of management ==
Deschamps first made a name for himself with Monaco as one of the best tacticians in Europe during the team's 2003–04 Champions League run, with his counter-attacking style.

During the 2018 World Cup with France, Deschamps used holding midfielder Blaise Matuidi in a new role, playing him out wide, rather than in the centre, as a left-sided defensive winger or attacking midfielder in a fluid 4–2–3–1 formation. In this system, he helped provide balance to the team by covering the left flank defensively, thus limiting the attacking threat of the opposing full-backs. This, in turn, gave Kylian Mbappé the licence to attack and run at defences from the right wing. Matuidi often tucked into the centre of the pitch, to provide defensive support to playmaker Paul Pogba in midfield, along with N'Golo Kanté, and help reduce spaces in their opponents' midfield. Deschamps also used centre-forward Olivier Giroud as a false-9 who used his physicality to create space and chances for forwards Antoine Griezmann and Mbappé, giving them the freedom to generate opportunities and score, in a similar manner to Stéphane Guivarc'h, who was Deschamps's teammate in the victorious French 1998 World Cup side. However, his pragmatic and defensive style drew criticism from several Belgian players following France's semi-final victory in the tournament.

During the 2022 World Cup, due to injuries to several midfielders, Deschamps used Griezmann in a deeper role as a central midfielder, in which he excelled due to his vision, work rate, and ability to link defence and attack.

Deschamps is known for being a successful tournament manager and setting teams up with a solid foundation and work ethic. Goalkeeper Hugo Lloris describes him as being "calm and collected and transmits that to the players". Due to his success at the international level, he is regarded as one of the greatest international managers of all time.

Deschamps places significant importance on creating a cohesive team environment by developing positive relationships with his players. He also believes in the importance of his players' personalities and how they gel with one another. He also likes to lead by example in his professional relationships with his staff and players. While he believes in controlling possession, he stresses the importance of transitions during matches in particular. Tactically, Deschamps likes to let matches unfold without giving instructions to his players from the bench, and does not believe in being overly controlling with his players. He likes to observe the match and discuss any possible changes with his staff.

== Personal life ==
Deschamps married Claude Antoinette in 1989. Together they have a son, who was born in 1996. He was raised a Catholic. Deschamps' brother Philippe died in a plane crash when Deschamps was 19 years old which he said has "marked [his] life".

He is a first cousin of retired professional tennis player and 1998 Wimbledon finalist Nathalie Tauziat.

== Career statistics ==
=== Club ===
Appearances and goals by club, season and competition
Club	Season	League			National cup (Note: Includes Coupe de France, Coppa Italia, FA Cup, Copa del Rey)		Europe		Other		Total	
Club	Season	Division	Apps	Goals	Apps	Goals	Apps	Goals	Apps	Goals	Apps	Goals
Nantes	1985–86	Division 1	7	0	0	0	1	0	—		8	0
Nantes	1986–87	Division 1	19	0	1	0	2 (Note: Appearances in UEFA Cup)	0	—		22	0
Nantes	1987–88	Division 1	30	2	3	0	—		—		33	2
Nantes	1988–89	Division 1	36	1	5	0	—		—		41	1
Nantes	1989–90	Division 1	19	1	0	0	—		—		19	1
Nantes	Total		111	4	9	0	!3	0	0	0	123	4
Marseille	1989–90	Division 1	17	1	5	3	4 (Note: Appearances in European Cup)	0	—		26	4
Marseille	1991–92	Division 1	36	4	4	0	4	0	—		44	4
Marseille	1992–93	Division 1	36	1	3	0	11 (Note: Appearances in UEFA Champions League)	0	—		50	1
Marseille	1993–94	Division 1	34	0	4	0	—		—		38	0
Marseille	Total		123	6	16	3	19	0	0	0	158	9
Bordeaux (loan)	1990–91	Division 1	29	3	1	0	4	0	—		34	3
Juventus	1994–95	Serie A	14	1	3	0	6	0	—		23	1
Juventus	1995–96	Serie A	30	2	1	0	8	0	1 (Note: Appearance in Supercoppa Italiana)	0	40	2
Juventus	1996–97	Serie A	26	1	3	0	10	0	2 (Note: One appearance in UEFA Super Cup, one appearance in Intercontinental Cup)	0	41	1
Juventus	1997–98	Serie A	25	0	0	0	8	0	1	0	34	0
Juventus	1998–99	Serie A	29	0	1	0	9	0	1	0	40	0
Juventus	Total		124	4	8	0	41	0	5	0	178	4
Chelsea	1999–2000	Premier League	27	0	6	0	14	1	—		47	1
Valencia	2000–01	La Liga	13	0	1	0	7	0	—		21	0
Career total			427	17	41	3	88	1	5	0	561	21

=== International ===
Appearances and goals by national team and year
National team	Year	Apps	Goals
France	1989	5	2
France	1990	6	1
France	1991	6	0
France	1992	11	0
France	1993	8	0
France	1994	4	0
France	1995	5	0
France	1996	12	0
France	1997	6	1
France	1998	17	0
France	1999	9	0
France	2000	14	0
Total		103	4

Scores and results list France's goal tally first; the score column indicates the score after each Deschamps goal.

List of international goals scored by Didier Deschamps
No.	Date	Venue	Opponent	Score	Result	Competition
1	11 October 1989	Parc des Princes, Paris, France	Scotland	1–0	3–0	1990 FIFA World Cup qualification
2	18 November 1989	Stadium Municipal, Toulouse, France	Cyprus	1–0	2–0	1990 FIFA World Cup qualification
3	24 January 1990	Al-Sadaqua Walsalam, Kuwait City, Kuwait	East Germany	3–0	3–0	Friendly
4	22 January 1997	Estádio Primeiro de Maio, Braga, Portugal	Portugal	1–0	2–0	Friendly

== Managerial statistics ==
As of 18 July 2026

Managerial record by team and tenure
Team	From	To	Record					Ref.
Team	From	To	P	W	D	L	Win %	Ref.
Monaco	1 July 2001	19 September 2005	220	110	59	51	50.0	
Juventus	10 July 2006	26 May 2007	43	30	11	2	69.8	
Marseille	1 July 2009	2 July 2012	163	82	40	41	50.3	
France	8 July 2012	18 July 2026	185	120	35	30	64.9	
Career total			611	342	145	124	56.0	

== Honours ==
=== Player ===
Marseille

- Ligue 1: 1989–90, 1991–92
- UEFA Champions League: 1992–93

Juventus

- Serie A: 1994–95, 1996–97, 1997–98
- Coppa Italia: 1994–95
- Supercoppa Italiana: 1995, 1997
- Intercontinental Cup: 1996
- UEFA Champions League: 1995–96; runner-up: 1996–97, 1997–98
- UEFA Cup runner-up: 1994–95
- UEFA Intertoto Cup: 1999
- UEFA Super Cup: 1996

Chelsea

- FA Cup: 1999–2000

Valencia

- UEFA Champions League runner-up: 2000–01

France

- FIFA World Cup: 1998
- UEFA European Championship: 2000

Individual

- Division 1 Rookie of the Year: 1989
- Onze Mondial: 1992, 1993, 1996, 1997
- French Player of the Year: 1996
- UEFA European Championship Team of the Tournament: 1996
- FIFA 100: 2004
- The Dream Team 110 years of OM: 2010
- Golden Foot Award Legends: 2018
- 9th French Player of the Century

=== Manager ===
Monaco

- Coupe de la Ligue: 2002–03
- UEFA Champions League runner-up: 2003–04

Juventus

- Serie B: 2006–07

Marseille

- Ligue 1: 2009–10
- Coupe de la Ligue: 2009–10, 2010–11, 2011–12
- Trophée des Champions: 2010, 2011

France

- FIFA World Cup: 2018; runner-up: 2022
- UEFA Nations League: 2020–21; third place: 2024–25
- UEFA European Championship runner-up: 2016

Individual

- Ligue 1 Manager of the Year: 2004
- The Best FIFA Football Coach: 2018
- Globe Soccer Awards Coach of the Year: 2018
- World Soccer magazine World Manager of the Year: 2018
- IFFHS World's Best National Coach: 2018, 2020

=== Orders ===
- Knight of the Legion of Honour: 1998
- Officer of the Legion of Honour: 2018

== See also ==
- List of men's footballers with 100 or more international caps
- National team managers with 100 or more matches
