= 1990 Coupe de France final =

- Event: 1989–90 Coupe de France
Montpellier	RC Paris
2	1
- After extra time
- Date: 2 June 1990
- Venue: Parc des Princes, Paris
- Referee: Gérard Biguet
- Attendance: 44,067

The 1990 Coupe de France final was a football match held at Parc des Princes, Paris on 2 June 1990, that saw Montpellier HSC defeat RC Paris 2–1 in extra time, thanks to goals by Laurent Blanc and Abdelkader Ferhaoui.

== Road to the final ==
Montpellier			Round	RC Paris
Opponent	H/A	Result	1989–90 Coupe de France	Opponent	H/A	Result
Istres	—	1–0	Round of 64	Angers	—	3–2 (a.e.t.)
Louhans-Cuiseaux	H	5–1	Round of 32	Sedan	A	2–0
Nantes	H	2–0	Round of 16	Gueugnon	H	5–0
Avignon	A	1–0	Quarter-finals	Bordeaux	A	1–1 (a.e.t.); 5−4 pen.
Saint-Étienne	A	1–0	Semi-finals	Marseille	H	3–2

== Match details ==
2 June 1990
20:00

Montpellier	2–1 (a.e.t.)	RC Paris
Blanc 103'; Ferhaoui 108'		Ginola 109'

Parc des Princes, Paris
Attendance: 44,067
Referee: Gérard Biguet

GK	1	(France) Albert Rust
DF	2	(France) Pascal Baills	(yellow card) 31'
DF	3	(France) Frank Lucchesi
DF	4	(Brazil) Júlio César
DF	5	(France) Laurent Blanc (c)	(yellow card) 16'
MF	6	(France) Jean-Claude Lemoult
MF	7	(Algeria) Abdelkader Ferhaoui
MF	8	(France) William Ayache
MF	9	(France) Daniel Xuereb
FW	10	(France) Vincent Guérin
FW	11	(France) Eric Cantona	(yellow card) 38'
Substitutes:
Manager:
(France) Michel Mézy Assistant Referees: Fourth Official:

GK	1	(France) Pascal Olmeta
DF	2	(Benin) Hippolyte Dangbeto
DF	3	(France) Jean-Pierre Bade	(yellow card) 75'
DF	4	(France) Jean-Manuel Thetis	(yellow card) 65'
DF	5	(France) Michel Milojevic
MF	6	(Algeria) Halim Benmabrouk (c)	(yellow card) 59'
MF	7	(France) Stéphane Blondeau	(yellow card) 94'
MF	8	(Morocco) Aziz Bouderbala
MF	9	(Morocco) Abdeljalil Aïd		(substituted off) 57'
FW	10	(France) David Ginola	(yellow card) 52'
FW	11	(France) Philippe Avenet
Substitutes:
MF		(Portugal) Luís Sobrinho		(substituted on) 57'
Manager:
(Poland) Henryk Kasperczak

== See also ==
- 1989–90 Coupe de France
