= 1989–90 Olympique de Marseille season =

Olympique de Marseille
1989–90 season
- President: Bernard Tapie
- Manager: Gérard Gili
- Stadium: Stade Vélodrome
- French Division 1: 1st
- Coupe de France: Semi-finals
- European Cup: Semi-finals
- Top goalscorer: League: Jean-Pierre Papin (30); All: Jean-Pierre Papin (38)
- Average home league attendance: 31,727

The 1989–90 season saw Olympique de Marseille compete in the French Division 1 as reigning champions as well as the 1989–90 Coupe de France and the 1989–90 European Cup.

== Overview ==
In the summer of 1989, Marseille lost many big name players including prolific Germany striker Klaus Allofs who went to rivals Bordeaux and France defender Yvon Le Roux who transferred to PSG. Owner, Bernard Tapie, brought in reinforcements for the double winners though, signing Enzo Francescoli, Carlos Mozer, Jean Tigana, Alain Roche, Manuel Amoros, and Chris Waddle. Of the transfers, Waddle was the most high-profile and the £4.5m Marseille paid Tottenham for Waddle equalled a British record fee and the sixth highest ever paid at that point.

Marseille went into the season as defending French Division 1 champions and successfully defend their crown, winning their seventh French league title overall. Marseille would go deep in both the Coupe de France and the European Cup but lost in the semi-finals in both competitions.

== Competitions ==
=== Division 1 ===
==== League table ====
Pos	Team	Pld	W	D	L	GF	GA	GD	Pts	Qualification or relegation
1	Marseille (C)	38	22	9	7	75	34	+41	53	Qualification to European Cup first round
2	Bordeaux	38	22	7	9	51	25	+26	51	Qualification to UEFA Cup first round
3	Monaco	38	15	16	7	38	24	+14	46	Qualification to UEFA Cup first round
4	Sochaux	38	17	9	12	46	39	+7	43	
5	Paris Saint-Germain	38	18	6	14	50	48	+2	42	

Source: Histoire du PSG
Rules for classification: 1) points; 2) goal difference; 3) number of goals scored.
Victory: 2 points, Draw: 1 point, Defeat: 0 points
(C) Champions

==== Results summary ====
Overall								Home						Away					
Pld	W	D	L	GF	GA	GD	Pts	W	D	L	GF	GA	GD	W	D	L	GF	GA	GD
38	22	9	7	75	34	+41	75	15	3	1	46	12	+34	7	6	6	29	22	+7

==== Results by round ====
Round	1	2	3	4	5	6	7	8	9	10	11	12	13	14	15	16	17	18	19	20	21	22	23	24	25	26	27	28	29	30	31	32	33	34	35	36	37	38
Ground	A	H	A	H	A	H	A	H	A	H	A	H	A	H	A	H	A	H	A	A	H	A	H	A	H	A	H	A	H	A	H	A	H	A	H	A	H	H
Result	W	W	L	W	D	W	D	W	W	W	W	W	L	D	L	W	W	D	W	D	W	L	W	D	W	W	D	D	W	L	W	D	W	L	W	W	W	L
Position	1	1	3	3	3	2	3	2	3	3	2	1	2	2	3	3	2	2	2	2	2	2	2	2	2	2	2	2	2	2	2	2	1	2	1	1	1	1

A = Away; H = Home; W = Win; D = Draw; L = Loss

=== Coupe de France ===
==== Semi-final ====
25 May 1990	Marseille	2–3	RC Paris	Stade Vélodrome, Marseille
	Germain 3'; Sauzée 61'	(Report)	Bouderbala 37'; Milojevic 83'; Aïd 88'

=== European Cup ===
==== First round ====
13 September 1989	Marseille	3–0	(Denmark) Brøndby	Stade Vélodrome, Marseille
	Sauzée 62'; Papin 67'; Vercruysse 81'	Report		Attendance: 18,686; Referee: Rosario Lo Bello (Italy)

27 September 1989	Brøndby (Denmark)	1–1	Marseille	Brøndby Stadion, Brøndbyvester
	Olsen 54'	Report	Papin 64'	Attendance: 10,300; Referee: Rodger Gifford (Wales)

Marseille won 4–1 on aggregate.

==== Second round ====
18 October 1989	Marseille	2–0	(Greece) AEK Athens	Stade Vélodrome, Marseille
22:00	Papin 55'; Manolas 80' (o.g.)	Report		Attendance: 24,263; Referee: Georges Sandoz (Switzerland)

1 November 1989	AEK Athens (Greece)	1–1	Marseille	AEK Stadium, Athens
21:00	Savevski 79' (pen.)	Report	Papin 84'	Attendance: 33,260; Referee: Helmut Kohl (Austria)

Marseille won 3–1 on aggregate.

==== Quarter-final ====
7 March 1990	CSKA Sofia (Bulgaria)	0–1	Marseille	Narodna Armia, Sofia
		Report	Thys 85'	Attendance: 26,300; Referee: Aron Schmidhuber (Germany)

21 March 1990	Marseille	3–1	(Bulgaria) CSKA Sofia	Stade Vélodrome, Marseille
	Waddle 25'; Papin 28'; Sauzée 72'	Report	Urukov 84'	Attendance: 34,665; Referee: Lajos Nemeth (Hungary)

Marseille won 4–1 on aggregate.

==== Semi-final ====
4 April 1990	Marseille	2–1	(Portugal) Benfica	Stade Vélodrome, Marseille
	Sauzée 13'; Papin 44'	Report	Lima 10'	Attendance: 36,859; Referee: George Courtney (England)

18 April 1990	Benfica (Portugal)	1–0	Marseille	Estádio da Luz, Lisbon
	Vata 82'	Report		Attendance: 120,000; Referee: Marcel Van Langenhove (Belgium)

Marseille 2–2 Benfica on aggregate. Benfica won on away goals.
