= Jean Tigana =

French football manager (born 1955)

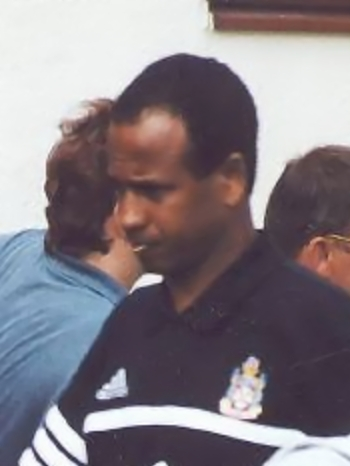
- Tigana in 2000 or 2001

Personal information
- Full name: Amadou Jean Tigana
- Date of birth: 23 June 1955 (age 71)
- Place of birth: Bamako, French Sudan
- Height: 1.68 m (5 ft 6 in)
- Position: Central midfielder

Youth career
- 1965–1972: ASPTT Marseille
- 1972–1974: SO Les Caillols
- 1974–1975: Cassis

Senior career*
Years	Team	Apps	(Gls)
1975–1978	Toulon	76	(10)
1978–1981	Lyon	104	(15)
1981–1989	Bordeaux	251	(11)
1989–1991	Marseille	56	(0)
Total		487	(36)

International career
1980–1988	France	52	(1)

Managerial career
- 1993–1995: Lyon
- 1995–1999: Monaco
- 2000–2003: Fulham
- 2005–2007: Beşiktaş
- 2010–2011: Bordeaux
- 2012: Shanghai Shenhua
Medal record
Men's football
Representing France
FIFA World Cup
Third place	1986
UEFA European Championship
Winner	1984
- * Club domestic league appearances and goals

Amadou Jean Tigana (born 23 June 1955) is a former professional football player and manager. A central midfielder, he was renowned as one of the best midfielders in the world during the 1980s. He spent his entire playing career in France, and made 52 appearances and scored one goal for the France national team. Following his playing career, he became a manager, coaching clubs in France, England, Turkey and China.

== Club career ==
Tigana started his professional career as a player at Toulon, having been spotted fairly late playing part-time while employed in a spaghetti factory and then as a postman. He moved to Lyon in 1978 and then to Bordeaux in a $4 million transfer. In Bordeaux's midfield for eight years, Tigana helped them to three league titles and three French cups, as well as taking them close to European glory on two occasions, losing in the semi-final of the European Cup and Cup Winners' Cup in 1985 and 1987 respectively.

He moved in 1989 to Marseille, and ended his career there following the 1990–91 season, winning two consecutive league titles, and reaching the European Cup final during the latter season, only to be defeated by Red Star Belgrade on penalties following a 0–0 draw.

== International career ==
Tigana was born in Bamako, French Sudan (now Mali) to a Malian father and a French mother. He represented France, and as an international Tigana joined Michel Platini, Luis Fernandez and Alain Giresse in what was termed "the Magic Square" (le Carré Magique) – one of the greatest midfield foursomes of all time. He was part of the France national football team that won UEFA Euro 1984 on home soil, defeating Spain in the final. Tigana's single international goal came against Hungary in the 1986 FIFA World Cup finals, in which France managed a third-place finish.

== Playing style ==
Tigana was a world-class box-to box midfielder, who usually played in the centre, and who was noted for his great movement, teamwork, pace and tireless stamina. Although Tigana was mainly responsible for his team's defensive duties, he also often ventured forward to create scoring opportunities for his teammates. His work ethic and expansive range of passing, from both long and short range, made him an excellent distributor which, when combined with his close control and simplistic yet efficient dribbling technique, made him a world–class midfielder. He was also well known for his contributions in the more advanced areas of the pitch, due to his ability to spot and execute defence-splitting passes.

== Managerial career ==
For his first managerial role, Tigana returned to Lyon, coaching them from 1993 to 1995, before moving on to Monaco replacing Arsene Wenger, where he remained until 1999. They were French league champions in 1997 and Champions League semi-finalists a year later, beating Manchester United in the quarter-finals.

He took over as manager of English club Fulham in April 2000 and helped them to promotion from Division One to the FA Premier League as champions in his first full season. They finished 13th in their first top-flight season for more than 30 years and qualified for the UEFA Cup (via the Intertoto Cup), but he was sacked in April 2003, even though Fulham were in no danger of going down at this stage. The club later took him to court, claiming he had wrongly overpaid for certain players such as Steve Marlet, but the charges were dropped. Tigana then took Fulham to court for wrongful dismissal and won, winning a payout of over £2 million.

In October 2005, after a two years plus game hiatus, he signed a two-and-a-half-year contract with Turkish side Beşiktaş. During that same season, Beşiktaş won the Turkish Cup following an eight years hiatus.

Immediately after winning the 2007 Turkish Cup, Tigana announced that he was to leave Beşiktaş at the end of the season. He left Beşiktaş with two games to play, after a contract termination agreement with club board.

On 25 May 2010, Tigana returned to Ligue 1 coaching joining Bordeaux, replacing Laurent Blanc.

On 7 May 2011, after a severe defeat against Sochaux (0–4) and a verbal aggression from Bordeaux team fans against his daughter, who was in the stadium, he announced that he was to leave Bordeaux.

On 18 December 2011, it was announced that Tigana would coach Shanghai Shenhua from the 2012 season. On 15 April 2012, Tigana resigned as manager of Shanghai Shenhua after a run of poor form, leaving the Chinese club in the bottom five of its domestic league.

== Career statistics ==
=== Club ===
Appearances and goals by club, season and competition
Club	Season	League			National Cup		Europe		Total	
Club	Season	Division	Apps	Goals	Apps	Goals	Apps	Goals	Apps	Goals
Toulon	1975–76	Division 2	23	1			–		23	1
Toulon	1976–77	Division 2	27	3			–		27	3
Toulon	1977–78	Division 2	26	6			–		26	6
Toulon	Total		76	10	0	0	0	0	76	10
Lyon	1978–79	Division 1	36	3			–		36	3
Lyon	1979–80	Division 1	33	5			–		33	5
Lyon	1980–81	Division 1	35	7			–		35	7
Lyon	Total		104	15	0	0	0	0	104	15
Bordeaux	1981–82	Division 1	27	1			1 (Note: Appearances in UEFA Cup)	0	28	1
Bordeaux	1982–83	Division 1	32	2			5	0	37	1
Bordeaux	1983–84	Division 1	32	1			2	0	34	1
Bordeaux	1984–85	Division 1	28	3			6 (Note: Appearances in European Cup)	0	34	3
Bordeaux	1985–86	Division 1	32	2	3	1	2	0	37	3
Bordeaux	1986–87	Division 1	37	0	3	0	8 (Note: Appearances in European Cup Winners' Cup)	0	48	0
Bordeaux	1987–88	Division 1	30	1			5	0	35	1
Bordeaux	1988–89	Division 1	33	1			6	0	39	1
Bordeaux	Total		251	11	6	1	35	0	292	12
Marseille	1989–90	Division 1	37	0	2	0	8	0	47	0
Marseille	1990–91	Division 1	19	0	1	0	5	1	25	1
Marseille	Total		56	0	3	0	13	1	72	1
Total			487	36	9	1	48	1	544	38

=== International ===
France
Year	Apps	Goals
1980	4	0
1981	5	0
1982	12	0
1983	4	0
1984	10	0
1985	4	0
1986	11	1
1987	1	0
1988	1	0
Total	52	1

=== Managerial record ===
As of match played 7 April 2012

Managerial record by team and tenure
Team	From	To	Record				
Team	From	To	P	W	D	L	Win %
Lyon	1 July 1993	30 June 1995	85	42	20	23	49.41
Monaco	1 July 1995	31 December 1998	170	92	37	41	54.12
Fulham	9 April 2000	17 April 2003	145	67	37	41	46.21
Beşiktaş	31 October 2005	15 May 2007	82	43	16	23	52.44
Bordeaux	25 May 2010	7 May 2011	38	12	15	11	31.58
Shanghai Shenhua	1 January 2012	15 April 2012	5	1	2	2	20.0
Total			525	257	127	141	48.95

== Honours ==
=== Player ===
Bordeaux

- Division 1: 1983–84, 1984–85, 1986–87
- Coupe de France: 1985–86, 1986–87

Marseille

- Division 1: 1989–90, 1990–91

France

- UEFA European Championship: 1984
- FIFA World Cup third place: 1986

Individual

- Division 1 Rookie of the Year: 1980
- French Player of the Year: 1984
- Onze d'Argent: 1984
- Ballon d'Or runner-up: 1984
- UEFA European Championship Team of the Tournament: 1984
- UEFA European Championship top assist provider: 1984
- World XI: 1984, 1985, 1986, 1987
- Onze Mondial: 1984, 1985, 1986, 1987
- FIFA World Cup All-Star Team: 1986
- Onze de Bronze: 1987

=== Manager ===
Monaco

- Division 1: 1996–97
- Trophée des Champions: 1997

Fulham

- Football League First Division: 2000–01
- UEFA Intertoto Cup: 2002

Beşiktaş

- Turkish Cup: 2005–06, 2006–07
- Turkish Super Cup: 2006

Individual

- French Division 1 Manager of the Year: 1997
- French Manager of the Year: 1997

=== Orders ===
- Knight of the Legion of Honour: 2021
