= 1990–91 Olympique de Marseille season =

Olympique de Marseille
1990–91 season
- President: Bernard Tapie
- Manager: Gérard Gili (until 1 September 1990); Franz Beckenbauer (1 September 1990–31 December 1990); Raymond Goethals (from January 1991)
- Stadium: Stade Vélodrome
- French Division 1: 1st
- Coupe de France: Runners-up
- European Cup: Runners-up
- Top goalscorer: League: Jean-Pierre Papin (23); All: Jean-Pierre Papin (36)
- Average home league attendance: 31,025

The 1990–91 season saw Olympique de Marseille compete in the French Division 1 as reigning champions as well as the 1990–91 Coupe de France and the 1990–91 European Cup.

== Season summary ==
Two-time league winning manager Gérard Gili began the season in charge but was sacked in September and replaced by Bayern Munich legend and World Cup winner Franz Beckenbauer. Beckenbauer himself would be replaced mid-way through the season after a run of mixed results by Belgian manager Raymond Goethals, joining from Division 1 rivals Bordeaux.

Marseille would win their third straight league title and reached the final of both the Coupe de France and European Cup, making their first ever appearance in the final of the latter competition. Marseille lost both finals, to AS Monaco in the domestic cup, and in penalties to Red Star Belgrade in the European Cup.

== Overall record ==
Competition	First match	Last match	Starting round	Final position	Record							
Competition	First match	Last match	Starting round	Final position	Pld	W	D	L	GF	GA	GD	Win %
Division 1	21 July 1990	22 May 1991	Matchday 1	Winners	38	22	11	5	67	28	+39	57.89
Coupe de France	9 March 1991	8 June 1991	Round of 64	Runners-up	6	5	0	1	15	4	+11	83.33
European Cup	19 September 1990	29 May 1991	First round	Runners-up	9	5	3	1	22	8	+14	55.56
Total					53	32	14	7	104	40	+64	60.38

Source: FBREF

== Competitions ==
=== Division 1 ===
==== League table ====
Pos	Team	Pld	W	D	L	GF	GA	GD	Pts	Qualification or relegation
1	Marseille (C)	38	22	11	5	67	28	+39	55	Qualification to European Cup first round
2	Monaco	38	20	11	7	51	30	+21	51	Qualification to Cup Winners' Cup first round (Note: Monaco qualified for the 1991–92 European Cup Winners' Cup as winners of the 1990–91 Coupe de France.)
3	Auxerre	38	19	10	9	63	36	+27	48	Qualification to UEFA Cup first round
4	Cannes	38	12	17	9	32	28	+4	41	Qualification to UEFA Cup first round
5	Lyon	38	15	11	12	39	44	−5	41	Qualification to UEFA Cup first round

Source: Histoire du PSG
Rules for classification: 1) points; 2) goal difference; 3) number of goals scored.
Victory: 3 points, Draw: 1 point, Defeat: 0 points
(C) Champions

==== Results summary ====
Overall								Home						Away					
Pld	W	D	L	GF	GA	GD	Pts	W	D	L	GF	GA	GD	W	D	L	GF	GA	GD
38	22	11	5	67	28	+39	77	16	2	1	49	11	+38	6	9	4	18	17	+1

==== Results by round ====
Round	1	2	3	4	5	6	7	8	9	10	11	12	13	14	15	16	17	18	19	20	21	22	23	24	25	26	27	28	29	30	31	32	33	34	35	36	37	38
Ground	H	A	H	A	H	A	H	H	A	H	A	H	A	H	A	H	A	H	A	H	A	H	A	H	A	A	H	A	H	A	H	A	H	A	H	A	H	A
Result	W	W	W	D	W	D	W	W	W	L	W	W	L	W	L	W	W	W	L	W	D	W	L	W	D	W	W	D	W	D	D	D	W	D	D	D	W	W
Position	4	1	2	1	1	1	1	1	1	1	1	1	1	1	2	1	1	1	1	1	1	1	1	1	1	1	1	1	1	1	1	1	1	1	1	1	1	1

A = Away; H = Home; W = Win; D = Draw; L = Loss

=== Coupe de France ===
May 1991 Quarter-final	FC Nantes	1–2	Marseille	Stade de la Beaujoire, Nantes
	Le Guen 77'	(Report)	Papin 81'; Boli 104'	Referee: Claude Bouillet

2 June 1991 Semi-final	Marseille	4–1	Rodez AF	Stade Vélodrome, Marseille
	Papin 19' 22' 32'; Vercruysse 58'	(Report)	Pradier 79'	Referee: Marcel Lainé

8 June 1991 Final	AS Monaco	1–0	Marseille	Parc des Princes, Paris
	Passi 90'	Report		Attendance: 44,123; Referee: Joël Quiniou

=== European Cup ===
==== First round ====
19 September 1990 First leg	Marseille (France)	5–1	(Albania) Dinamo Tirana	Stade Vélodrome, Marseille
20:30 CEST	Papin 44' (pen.), 63', 75'; Cantona 70'; Vercruysse 90'	Report	Tahiri 89' (pen.)	Attendance: 22,328; Referee: Frans Houben (Netherlands)

3 October 1990 Second leg	Dinamo Tirana (Albania)	0–0 (1–5 agg.)	(France) Marseille	Qemal Stafa Stadium, Tirana
15:30 CEST		Report		Attendance: 6,200; Referee: Pierluigi Pairetto (Italy)

==== Second round ====
25 October 1990 First leg	Lech Poznań (Poland)	3–2	(France) Marseille	Stadion Miejski w Poznaniu, Poznań
20:45 CEST	Łukasik 31'; Pachelski 41'; Juskowiak 58'	Report	Fournier 8'; Waddle 64'	Attendance: 12,661; Referee: Thorbjørn Aas (Norway)

7 November 1990 Second leg	Marseille (France)	6–1 (8–4 agg.)	(Poland) Lech Poznań	Stade Vélodrome, Marseille
21:00 CET	Papin 19'; Vercruysse 34', 45', 84'; Tigana 89'; Boli 90'	Report	Jakołcewicz 59' (pen.)	Attendance: 29,588; Referee: Joseph Worrall (England)

==== Quarter-final ====
6 March 1991 First leg	Milan (Italy)	1–1	(France) Marseille	San Siro, Milan
20:30 CET	Gullit 14'	Report	Papin 27'	Attendance: 81,051; Referee: Bruno Galler (Switzerland)

20 March 1991 Second leg	Marseille (France)	3–0 (4–1 (Note: The match was interrupted in injury time due to poor visibility after two of the four floodlights in the stadium failed. Marseille led 1–0 on the night and 1-2 on aggregate at the moment. When power was restored after 15 minutes, Milan director Adriano Galliani decided not to let his team go back on the pitch at which point the contest was abandoned permanently. UEFA awarded a 3–0 win to Marseille and banned Milan for a year from European competition including suspending Galliani from all official club functions for two years.) agg.)	(Italy) Milan	Stade Vélodrome, Marseille
20:30 CET	Waddle 75'	Report		Attendance: 37,603; Referee: Bo Karlsson (Sweden)

==== Semi-final ====
10 April 1991 First leg	Spartak Moscow (Soviet Union)	1–3	(France) Marseille	Central Lenin Stadium, Moscow
17:00 CEST	Shalimov 58'	Report	Pelé 27'; Papin 31'; Vercruysse 88'	Attendance: 85,500; Referee: Peter Mikkelen (Denmark)

24 April 1991 Second leg	Marseille (France)	2–1 (5–2 agg.)	(Soviet Union) Spartak Moscow	Stade Vélodrome, Marseille
20:45 CEST	Pelé 34'; Boli 48'	Report	Mostovoi 58' (pen.)	Attendance: 37,466; Referee: Keith Hackett (England)

==== Final ====
29 May 1991 Final	Red Star Belgrade (Socialist Federal Republic of Yugoslavia)	0–0 (a.e.t.) (5–3 p)	(France) Marseille	Stadio San Nicola, Bari
20:15 CEST		Report		Attendance: 51,587; Referee: Tullio Lanese (Italy)
	Penalties
	Prosinečki (penalty scored); Binić (penalty scored); Belodedici (penalty scored); Mihajlović (penalty scored); Pančev (penalty scored)		(penalty missed) Amoros; (penalty scored) Casoni; (penalty scored) Papin; (penalty scored) Mozer
