= 1991 Ballon d'Or =

Annual association football award event in France

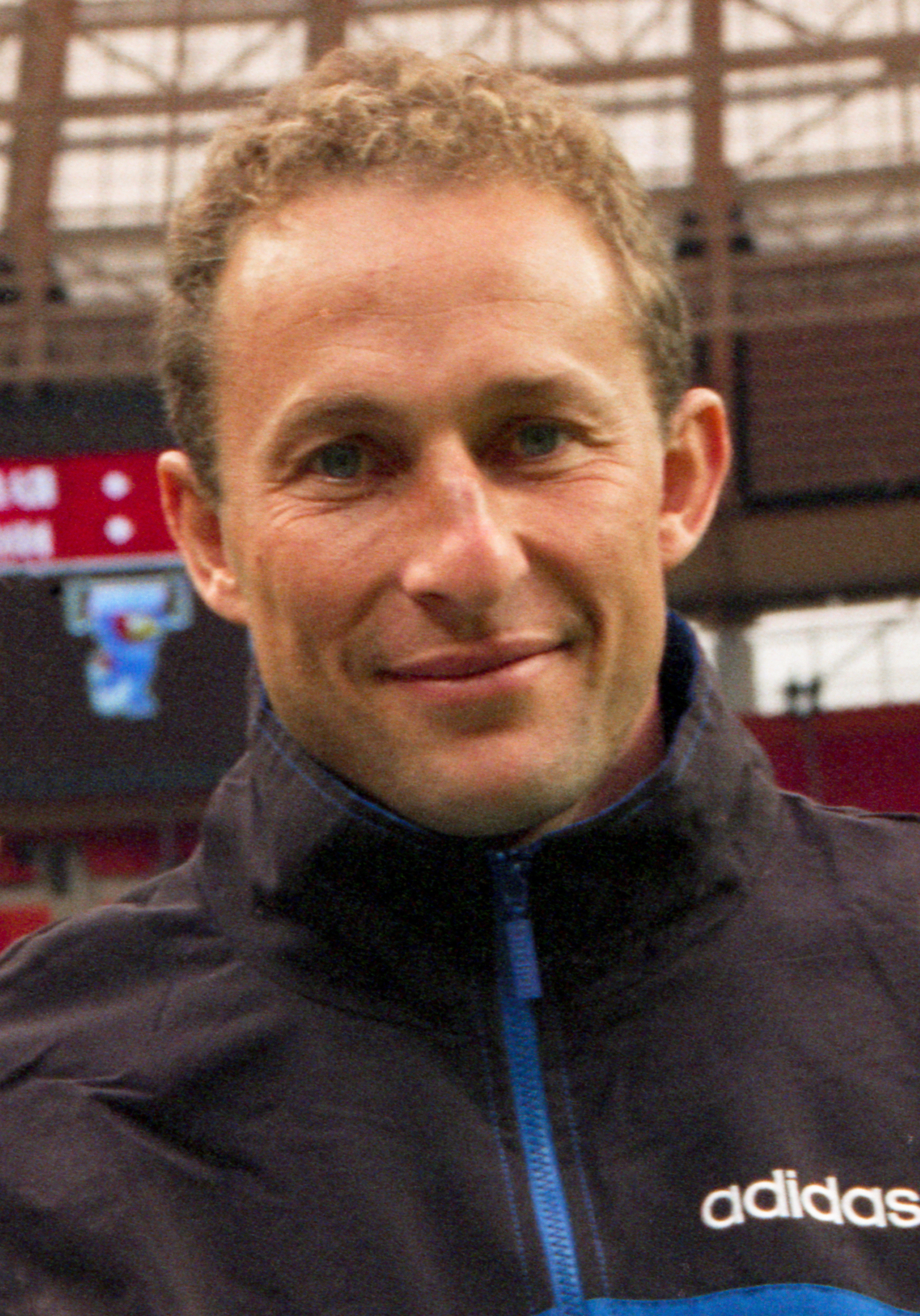
- 1991 Ballon d'Or winner, Jean-Pierre Papin in 1997
- Date: 24 December 1991
- Presented by: France Football

Highlights
- Won by: (France) Jean-Pierre Papin (1st award)
- Website: ballondor.com

The 1991 Ballon d'Or, given to the best football player in Europe as judged by a panel of sports journalists from UEFA member countries, was awarded to Jean-Pierre Papin on 24 December 1991.

Papin was the third French national to win the award after Raymond Kopa (1958) and Michel Platini (1983, 1984 and 1985). He was also the first player from the French League to win the trophy.

== Rankings ==
Rank	Name	Club(s)	Nationality	Points
1	Jean-Pierre Papin	(France) Marseille	France	141
2	Dejan Savićević	(Socialist Federal Republic of Yugoslavia) Red Star Belgrade	Yugoslavia	42
2	Darko Pančev	(Socialist Federal Republic of Yugoslavia) Red Star Belgrade	Yugoslavia	42
2	Lothar Matthäus	(Italy) Internazionale	Germany	42
5	Robert Prosinečki	(Socialist Federal Republic of Yugoslavia) Red Star Belgrade (Spain) Real Madrid	Yugoslavia	34
6	Gary Lineker	(England) Tottenham Hotspur	England	33
7	Gianluca Vialli	(Italy) Sampdoria	Italy	18
8	Miodrag Belodedici	(Socialist Federal Republic of Yugoslavia) Red Star Belgrade	Romania	15
9	Mark Hughes	(England) Manchester United	Wales	12
10	Chris Waddle	(France) Marseille	England	11
11	Michael Laudrup	(Spain) Barcelona	Denmark	7
12	Rudi Völler	(Italy) Roma	Germany	5
13	Txiki Begiristain	(Spain) Barcelona	Spain	3
13	Stéphane Chapuisat	(Germany) Borussia Dortmund	Switzerland	3
13	Bruno Martini	(France) Auxerre	France	3
13	Paul McGrath	(England) Aston Villa	Republic of Ireland	3
13	Dean Saunders	(England) Derby County (England) Liverpool	Wales	3
13	Hristo Stoichkov	(Spain) Barcelona	Bulgaria	3
19	Roberto Mancini	(Italy) Sampdoria	Italy	2
19	Marco van Basten	(Italy) Milan	Netherlands	2
21	Guido Buchwald	(Germany) VfB Stuttgart	Germany	1
21	Thomas Doll	(Italy) Lazio	Germany	1
21	Stefan Effenberg	(Germany) Bayern Munich	Germany	1
21	Ruud Gullit	(Italy) Milan	Netherlands	1
21	Gheorghe Hagi	(Spain) Real Madrid	Romania	1
21	Oleksiy Mykhaylychenko	(Scotland) Rangers	Soviet Union	1
21	Gary Pallister	(England) Manchester United	England	1
21	Dimitris Saravakos	(Greece) Panathinaikos	Greece	1
21	Gianluca Pagliuca	(Italy) Sampdoria	Italy	1
21	Guy Hellers	(Belgium) Standard Liège	Luxembourg	1
21	Laurent Blanc	(Italy) Napoli	France	1
