= 1991–92 Olympique de Marseille season =

Olympique de Marseille
1991–92 season
- President: Bernard Tapie
- Manager: Tomislav Ivić (until 23 October 1991); Raymond Goethals (from 23 October)
- Stadium: Stade Vélodrome
- French Division 1: 1st
- Coupe de France: Semi-finals (abandoned)
- European Cup: Second round
- Top goalscorer: League: Jean-Pierre Papin (27); All: Jean-Pierre Papin (38)
Home colours	Away colours

During the 1991–92 season, Olympique de Marseille competed in the French Division 1 as three-time reigning champions, the 1991–92 Coupe de France and the 1991–92 European Cup.

== Squad ==
Goalkeeper

- (France) Pascal Olmeta

Defence

- (France) Manuel Amoros
- (France) Jocelyn Angloma
- (France) Pascal Baills
- (France) Basile Boli
- (France) Bernard Casoni
- (France) Marcel Desailly
- (France) Eric Di Meco
- (Brazil) Carlos Mozer

Midfield

- (France) Alain Boghossian
- (France) Didier Deschamps
- (France) Jean-Philippe Durand
- (France) Patrice Eyraud
- (France) Jean-Christophe Marquet
- (France) Franck Sauzée
- (England) Trevor Steven
- (Socialist Federal Republic of Yugoslavia) Dragan Stojkovic (on loan)

Attack

- (France) Marc Libbra
- (France) Jean-Pierre Papin
- (Ghana) Abedi Pele
- (England) Chris Waddle
- (France) Daniel Xuereb

Management

- (Croatia) Tomislav Ivic, later (Belgium) Raymond Goethals(Coach)

== Competitions ==
=== Division 1 ===
==== League table ====
Pos	Team	Pld	W	D	L	GF	GA	GD	Pts	Qualification or relegation
1	Marseille (C)	38	23	12	3	67	21	+46	58	Qualification to Champions League first round
2	Monaco	38	22	8	8	55	33	+22	52	Qualification to Cup Winners' Cup first round (Note: Monaco qualified for the 1992–93 European Cup Winners' Cup as finalists of the 1991–92 Coupe de France.)
3	Paris Saint-Germain	38	15	17	6	43	27	+16	47	Qualification to UEFA Cup first round
4	Auxerre	38	16	12	10	55	32	+23	44	Qualification to UEFA Cup first round
5	Caen	38	17	10	11	45	44	+1	44	Qualification to UEFA Cup first round

Rules for classification: 1) points; 2) goal difference; 3) number of goals scored.
Victory: 2 points, Draw: 1 point, Defeat: 0 points
(C) Champions
Notes:

Promoted from Ligue 2, who will play in Division 1 season 1992/1993

- Bordeaux:Champion of Division 2, winner of Division 2 group B
- Valenciennes FC:Runner-up, winner of Division 2 group A
- RC Strasbourg:Third place, winner of barrages against Stade Rennais

==== Results summary ====
Overall								Home						Away					
Pld	W	D	L	GF	GA	GD	Pts	W	D	L	GF	GA	GD	W	D	L	GF	GA	GD
38	23	12	3	67	21	+46	81	12	6	1	39	8	+31	11	6	2	28	13	+15

==== Results by round ====
Round	1	2	3	4	5	6	7	8	9	10	11	12	13	14	15	16	17	18	19	20	21	22	23	24	25	26	27	28	29	30	31	32	33	34	35	36	37	38
Ground	H	A	H	A	H	A	H	A	H	A	H	A	H	A	A	H	A	H	A	H	A	H	A	H	A	H	A	H	A	H	A	H	H	A	H	A	H	A
Result	W	D	W	W	D	W	W	L	W	W	D	D	W	D	W	W	D	D	W	D	D	W	D	W	W	L	W	D	L	W	W	W	W	W	D	W	W	W
Position	6	4	3	2	3	3	2	2	2	2	2	2	1	1	1	1	1	1	1	1	1	1	1	1	1	1	1	1	1	1	1	1	1	1	1	1	1	1

A = Away; H = Home; W = Win; D = Draw; L = Loss

=== Coupe de France ===
==== Semi-finals ====
5 May 1992	SC Bastia	Not played	Olympique de Marseille	Stade Furiani, Bastia
		(Report)

=== European Cup ===
==== First round ====
18 September 1991	Union Luxembourg	0–5	(France) Marseille	Luxembourg
		Report	Papin 11', 31', 85' (pen.); Xuereb 14'; Sauzée 44'	Attendance: 9,000; Referee: Michael Caulfield (Ireland)

2 October 1991	Marseille (France)	5–0	Union Luxembourg	Stade Vélodrome, Marseille
	Papin 15', 46'; Angloma 56'; Eyraud 60'; Xuereb 75'	Report		Attendance: 15,000; Referee: Loizos Loizou (Cyprus)

Marseille won 10–0 on aggregate.

==== Second round ====
23 October 1991	Marseille (France)	3–2	(Czechoslovakia) Sparta Prague	Stade Vélodrome, Marseille
	Waddle 34'; Papin 55', 60'	Report	Vrabec 63' (pen.); Kukleta 80' (pen.)	Attendance: 10,016; Referee: Gerhard Kapl (Austria)

6 November 1991	Sparta Prague (Czechoslovakia)	2–1	(France) Marseille	Stadion Letná, Prague
	Frýdek 36'; Siegl 70'	Report	Pelé 86'	Attendance: 32,500; Referee: Allan Gunn (England)

Marseille 4–4 Sparta Prague on aggregate. Sparta Prague won on away goals.
