= Chris Waddle =

English footballer (born 1960)

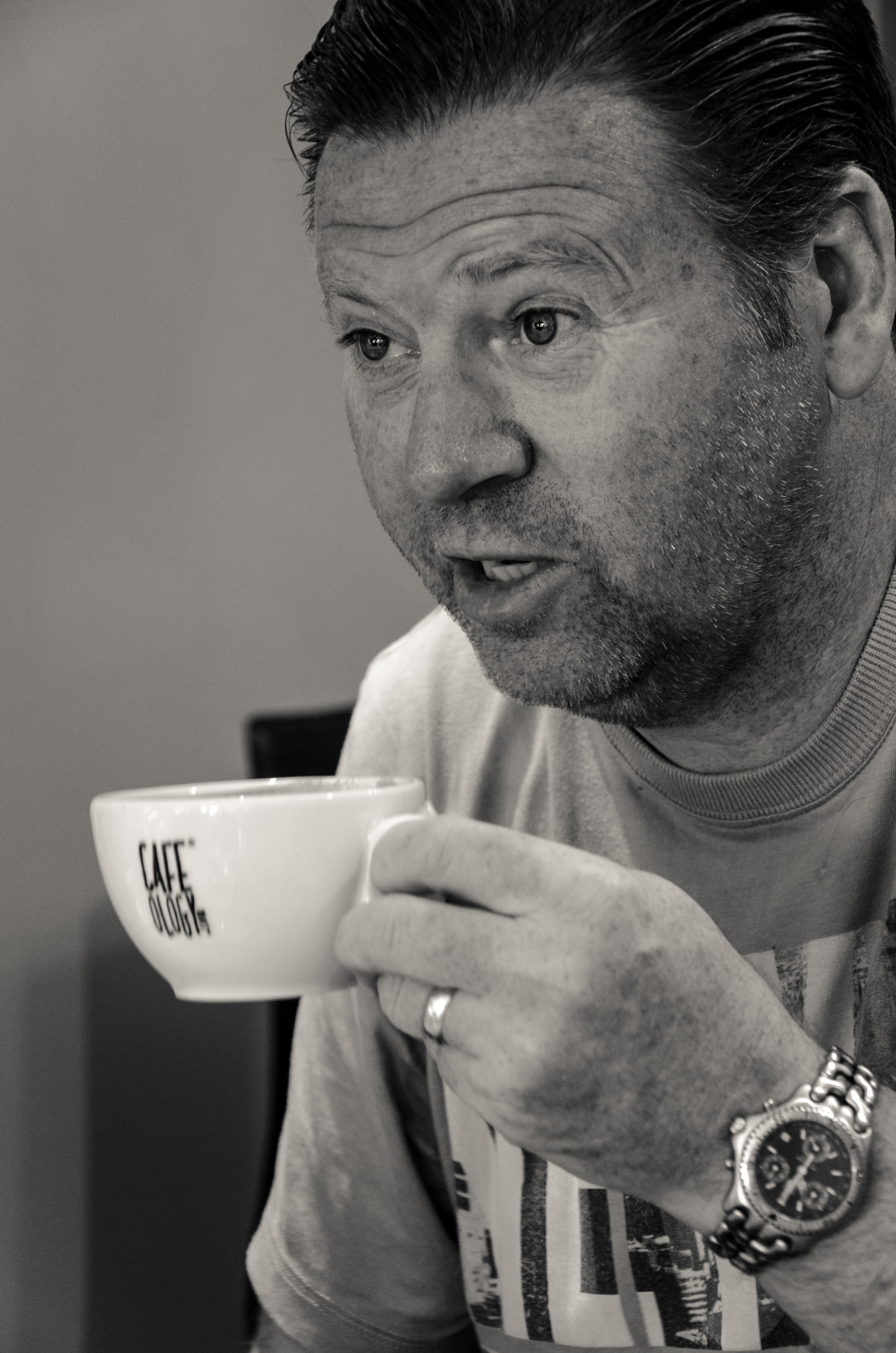
- Waddle in 2012

Personal information
- Full name: Christopher Roland Waddle
- Date of birth: 14 December 1960 (age 65)
- Place of birth: Felling, England
- Height: 6 ft 0 in (1.83 m)
- Positions: Winger; attacking midfielder

Senior career*
| Years | Team | Apps | (Gls) |
| 1978–1980 | Tow Law Town | | |
| 1980–1985 | Newcastle United | 170 | (46) |
| 1985–1989 | Tottenham Hotspur | 138 | (33) |
| 1989–1992 | Marseille | 107 | (22) |
| 1992–1996 | Sheffield Wednesday | 109 | (10) |
| 1996 | Falkirk | 4 | (1) |
| 1996–1997 | Bradford City | 25 | (6) |
| 1997 | Sunderland | 7 | (1) |
| 1997–1999 | Burnley | 32 | (1) |
| 2000–2002 | Torquay United | 7 | (0) |
| 2002 | Worksop Town | 60 | (3) |
| 2002 | Glapwell | 2 | (0) |
| 2013 | Stocksbridge Park Steels | 1 | (0) |
| 2013 | Hallam | 0 | (0) |
| Total | | 662 | (126) |

International career
| 1984 | England U21 | 1 | (1) |
| 1985–1991 | England | 62 | (6) |

Managerial career
- 1997–1998: Burnley
- * Club domestic league appearances and goals

Christopher Roland Waddle (born 14 December 1960) is an English former professional football player and manager. Since retiring, he has worked in the media for BBC Radio 5 Live as part of their Premier League and Champions League team. He currently works as a commentator.

Nicknamed "Magic Chris", football journalist Luke Ginnell wrote that Waddle was "widely acknowledged as one of the finest attacking midfielders in Europe". During his professional career, which lasted from 1978 to 1998, he played for several clubs, most notably Newcastle United, Tottenham Hotspur, Olympique de Marseille and Sheffield Wednesday.

In 1989, Waddle's transfer from Tottenham to Marseille for £4.5 million made him the third most valuable player in the world, and he won three successive Ligue 1 titles with the club and played in the 1991 European Cup final. While playing for Wednesday in the Premier League, he was voted FWA Footballer of the Year for his performances in the 1992–93 season. He also played in the Premier League for Sunderland, in the Scottish Premiership with Falkirk, and in the Football League for Bradford City, Burnley and Torquay United. He finished his career in non-League football with Worksop Town, Glapwell and Stocksbridge Park Steels, the latter whilst in his fifties. He continued to play at semi-professional level for Northern Counties East League side Hallam.

At international level, Waddle earned 62 caps for England between 1985 and 1991. He was a member of the teams that reached the quarter-finals of the 1986 FIFA World Cup and the semi-finals of the 1990 World Cup, and also played for England at UEFA Euro 1988.

Waddle had a brief spell as the manager of Burnley during the 1997–98 season, but has not returned to coaching since.

== Club career ==
=== Early career ===
Waddle began his footballing career with Pelaw Juniors, moving on to Whitehouse SC, Mount Pleasant SC, HMH Printing, Pelaw SC, Leam Lane SC and Clarke Chapman before joining Tow Law Town before the start of the 1978–79 season.

=== Newcastle United ===
While working in food processing (a seasoning factory), Waddle had unsuccessful trials with Sunderland and Coventry City. He joined Newcastle United as a 19-year-old in July 1980 for £1,000.

He made his Second Division debut for them in a 1–0 home win over Shrewsbury Town on 22 October 1980 and quickly established himself as an effective attacking midfielder, playing alongside Kevin Keegan and Peter Beardsley as Newcastle won promotion to the First Division at the end of 1983–84 season.

In one of his first games in the top flight, against Queen's Park Rangers at Loftus Road on 22 September 1984, Waddle scored a first half hat-trick for Newcastle, who had a 4–0 lead at half time. However, a fight back by QPR saw the game end 5–5.

=== Tottenham Hotspur ===
After 46 goals in 170 league games for Newcastle, Waddle joined Tottenham Hotspur on 1 July 1985 for a fee of £590,000 (decided by a transfer tribunal). He scored twice on his league debut, a 4–0 home win over Watford on the opening day of the league season, although Spurs had a disappointing season where they finished tenth a year after finishing third, resulting in the dismissal of Peter Shreeves as manager and the appointment of David Pleat from Luton Town as his successor.

He won an FA Cup runners-up medal in 1987 when Spurs were beaten by Coventry, while they also finished third in the League and got to the semi-finals of the League Cup.

=== Marseille ===
On 1 July 1989, after scoring 33 times in 138 league appearances for Tottenham, Waddle moved to French club Olympique de Marseille for a fee of £4.5 million; the third highest sum ever paid for a footballer at the time. During his time in France the club were French champions three times (1990, 1991 and 1992). They were also on the losing side to Red Star Belgrade in the 1991 European Cup Final. In 1991–92, he also played alongside fellow England midfielder Trevor Steven, who spent a year in France after signing from Rangers, only to return to Scotland after a single season there.

During his years at Marseille, the fans gave him the nickname "Magic Chris". He was known as the successor to former Marseille player Roger Magnusson. Waddle was also voted second best OM player of the century behind Jean Pierre Papin for the club's century anniversary in 1998. Waddle and Marseille reached the 1991 European Cup Final. Although he did not take a penalty, Waddle ended up on the losing side in a penalty shoot-out once again, after the game had ended 0–0 in normal time.

=== Sheffield Wednesday ===
Waddle returned to England in July 1992 in a £1 million move to Sheffield Wednesday, then managed by Trevor Francis. The club reached both domestic cup finals in the 1992–93 season (losing both to Arsenal – Waddle scored Wednesday's goal in the FA Cup final replay) and Waddle was voted the Football Writers' Association Footballer of the Year in 1993.

He helped Wednesday reach the semi-finals of the League Cup in the 1993–94 season, but this latest attempt at winning silverware was foiled by Manchester United, and the next two seasons brought bottom-half finishes in the league for Wednesday. Waddle's past also came back to haunt him in Wednesday's exit from the 1994–95 FA Cup, when a tie against Wolverhampton Wanderers was decided on a penalty shoot out, Waddle again missing an attempt. Francis was axed in 1995 and Waddle's former Tottenham manager David Pleat took over.

In January 1996, Kevin Keegan attempted to re-sign Waddle for Newcastle United as cover for David Ginola during a suspension, but Keegan's £500,000 bid to re-sign the player who had played alongside him in the Newcastle team more than a decade earlier was rejected and Keegan was unwilling to meet manager David Pleat's £1million asking price for the 35-year-old. Around this time, Celtic, Leeds United and Sunderland were also interested in signing Waddle, but none of these transfers ever happened. Burnley also expressed an interest in appointing him as their player-manager – a role he would finally take the following year – but Waddle saw out the season at Hillsborough.

Waddle's later career at Hillsborough was marred by injuries and he was released 5 games into the 1996–97 season (when the Owls were top of the premiership and having taken young sensation Ritchie Humphreys – 4 goals in 5 games – under his wing) after being frozen out of the team by David Pleat, having played 109 games and scored 10 goals with many more assists.

=== Falkirk and Bradford City ===
Waddle joined Falkirk, in the Scottish First Division, in September 1996, but returned south of the border to play for Division One strugglers Bradford City the following month. Although short, his time at City was a success and he was a firm fans favourite. In a match away to Huddersfield Town he scored direct from a corner in a 3–3 draw live on TV. He also scored a goal in a 3-2 FA Cup win against Everton at Goodison Park which came second in the February 1997 Match of the Day Goal of the Month. His efforts with Bradford contributed to their survival in Division One, although he did not complete the season there.

=== Sunderland ===
Waddle moved to Sunderland, the side he had supported as a boy, for a nominal fee of £75,000 in March 1997, but could not help Sunderland from being relegated from the Premier League at the end of the season, despite scoring once against Everton and providing the assist for all other Sunderland goals scored in that period.

=== Burnley ===
In May 1997 Waddle was appointed player-manager of Burnley, moving from Roker Park on a free transfer. Burnley had a disappointing season, only just avoiding relegation at the end of the season. He scored once during his spell at Burnley, the goal coming in a 2–2 draw with AFC Bournemouth in October 1997.

=== Torquay United ===
Waddle left Burnley in the summer, and in September 1998 joined Torquay United. He played just 7 times for Torquay, before returning to Sheffield Wednesday as a coach. He was appointed reserve team coach in July 1999, and played for a local pub side, but left in June 2000 on the appointment of Paul Jewell as manager, just after the club (now blighted by financial problems) suffered relegation from the Premier League.

=== Non-League career ===
Following his departure from Torquay United, Waddle resumed his playing career and spent two seasons with non-League Worksop Town making 60 appearances and scoring 3 goals, taking him past his 40th birthday. His most notable appearance was in a 12–0 Northern Premier League record win against Frickley Athletic. He also had a brief spell with Glapwell and one appearance for Stocksbridge Park Steels in the Northern Premier League First Division, continuing his playing career at non-League level into his early forties. Waddle later played regularly for Brunsmeer Athletic in the Meadowhall Sheffield & District Sunday Football League.

=== Hallam ===
Having played at amateur level in the Sheffield Wragg Over-40s league for Hallam during 2012–13 season he came out of retirement after 11 years on the sidelines and signed for Sheffield based non-League side Hallam in the Counties East League (tier 10 of the pyramid) on 22 July 2013. He made his debut against Chesterfield in a pre-season friendly, coming on as a substitute at half time. The game ended in a 6–2 defeat for Hallam FC. Waddle signed a one-year deal on 1 August 2013, committing to Hallam for the 2013–14 season promotion push while remaining part of the ESPN commentary team. He later rejoined in 2023.

== International career ==
Despite being in his 25th year, he was called up for the England Under-21 side and made his full squad debut against Ireland in March 1985.

On 26 March 1985, when still a Newcastle player, Waddle was capped at senior level by Bobby Robson's England for the first time in a 2–1 win over Republic of Ireland. He soon became a regular member of the England squad and on 16 October that year he scored his first England goal, on his tenth international appearance, in a 5–0 win over Turkey.

Waddle was in England's squad at the 1986 and 1990 FIFA World Cup as well as UEFA Euro 1988. Although England were eliminated at the group stages of Euro 88 after losing all three games, they did reach the quarter-finals of the 1986 World Cup and the semi-finals in 1990. Waddle had an eventful match in the semi-final against West Germany, which ended in defeat on a penalty shootout. Waddle hit the post with a shot in extra time, which could have been the winning goal, but then missed the decisive penalty in the shootout defeat as he put it inches over the bar. He says he only took the fifth penalty because Paul Gascoigne, who had been suspended from playing in the next game if England progressed, was too upset to take it. He subsequently blamed a chance meeting with Uri Geller and Michael Jackson prior to the tournament for missing his penalty. Waddle's performances in the 1990 World Cup were described as "superb" by Rob Bagchi, writing for The Guardian in 2010.

He won the last of his 62 England caps on 16 October 1991 in a 1–0 win over Turkey, more than six years after making his international debut, and having rarely missed an England game since then. He had scored six goals for England, the last against Scotland on 27 May 1989.

Waddle had fallen out of favour under coach Graham Taylor, but when Terry Venables became the new England manager at the beginning of 1994 he was keen to include Waddle in the squad for his first game against Denmark. However, Waddle was injured at the time and unavailable for selection.

== Media career ==
In 1987, Waddle recorded the song "Diamond Lights" in a duet with Spurs and England teammate Glenn Hoddle. The song reached number 12 in the UK singles chart in May of that year and the pair appeared on Top of the Pops. Whilst at Marseille he joined teammate Basile Boli in recording a song entitled We've Got a Feeling.

Despite spending the 1997–98 season as a manager, Waddle never returned to the coaching side of the game following his retirement and became a TV football pundit, commentator and sports newspaper writer. He previously worked for Setanta Sports and ESPN, he currently works as an analyst for BBC Radio Five Live's Premier League football coverage.

Waddle appeared on BBC Radio 5 Live as a summariser at Premier League matches and also writes a column in The Sun newspaper. Waddle signed a deal with Setanta Sports to commentate on all England away matches in 2008–09. Waddle then went on to co-commentate for ESPN's English Premier League football coverage and is a pundit on Showsports Arabia, covering the English Premier League, from the studio in Dubai, UAE.

Following England's heavy defeat to Germany in the second round of the 2010 FIFA World Cup, Waddle criticised the English Football Association, claiming: "The FA sit on their backsides and do nothing tournament after tournament after tournament. Why don't they listen? Why don't they look at other countries and ask 'how do they keep producing talent?' We coach talent out of players ... We lack so many ideas and it is so frustrating. The amount of money in our league is frightening and all we do is waste it on rubbish ideas ... We kid ourselves thinking we have a chance if we keep the tempo up. We can only play one way and it is poor. You can't go on playing football and hoping to win trophies playing a hundred miles an hour and putting teams under pressure for 90 minutes. You've got to be able to play slow, slow, quick and we can't do it."

In 2019 Waddle featured in the first season of ITV show Harry's Heroes, which featured former football manager Harry Redknapp attempting get a squad of former England international footballers back fit and healthy for a game against Germany legends.

== Personal life ==
Waddle has one daughter, Brooke, and a son called Jack. On 29 April 2012, Jack was given a one-year first-team contract at Chesterfield. His cousin, Alan Waddle, played league football for Halifax Town, Liverpool, Leicester City, Swansea City, Newport County, Mansfield Town, Hartlepool United and Peterborough United.

In 2005, he was arrested following claims he was involved in a brawl in a pub in Dore, Sheffield.

== In popular culture ==
Waddle was a key part of the pool of popular culture references used in the BBC comedy The Fast Show. References to, and photographs of, Waddle made regular appearances during the "Chanel 9" news segment of the show.

== Career statistics ==
=== Club ===
Appearances and goals by club, season and competition
| Club | Season | League | | | National cup | | League cup | | Europe | | Total | |
| Club | Season | Division | Apps | Goals | Apps | Goals | Apps | Goals | Apps | Goals | Apps | Goals |
|---|---|---|---|---|---|---|---|---|---|---|---|---|
| Newcastle United | 1980–81 | Second Division | 13 | 1 | 4 | 2 | 0 | 0 | — | | 17 | 3 |
| Newcastle United | 1981–82 | Second Division | 42 | 7 | 3 | 1 | 2 | 0 | — | | 47 | 8 |
| Newcastle United | 1982–83 | Second Division | 37 | 7 | 2 | 0 | 1 | 0 | — | | 40 | 7 |
| Newcastle United | 1983–84 | Second Division | 42 | 18 | 1 | 0 | 2 | 0 | — | | 45 | 18 |
| Newcastle United | 1984–85 | First Division | 36 | 13 | 2 | 1 | 4 | 2 | — | | 42 | 16 |
| Newcastle United | Total | | 170 | 46 | 12 | 4 | 9 | 2 | 0 | 0 | 191 | 52 |
| Tottenham Hotspur | 1985–86 | First Division | 39 | 11 | 5 | 2 | 6 | 1 | — | | 50 | 14 |
| Tottenham Hotspur | 1986–87 | First Division | 39 | 6 | 6 | 2 | 9 | 3 | — | | 54 | 11 |
| Tottenham Hotspur | 1987–88 | First Division | 22 | 2 | 2 | 1 | 1 | 0 | — | | 25 | 3 |
| Tottenham Hotspur | 1988–89 | First Division | 38 | 14 | 1 | 0 | 5 | 0 | — | | 44 | 14 |
| Tottenham Hotspur | Total | | 138 | 33 | 14 | 5 | 21 | 4 | 0 | 0 | 173 | 42 |
| Marseille | 1989–90 | Division 1 | 37 | 9 | 5 | 3 | — | | 8 | 1 | 50 | 12 |
| Marseille | 1990–91 | Division 1 | 35 | 6 | 5 | 0 | — | | 9 | 2 | 49 | 8 |
| Marseille | 1991–92 | Division 1 | 35 | 7 | 3 | 0 | — | | 3 | 1 | 41 | 8 |
| Marseille | Total | | 107 | 22 | 13 | 3 | — | | 20 | 4 | 149 | 29 |
| Sheffield Wednesday | 1992–93 | Premier League | 33 | 1 | 8 | 2 | 9 | 0 | 4 | 1 | 54 | 4 |
| Sheffield Wednesday | 1993–94 | Premier League | 19 | 3 | 1 | 0 | 6 | 0 | — | | 26 | 3 |
| Sheffield Wednesday | 1994–95 | Premier League | 25 | 4 | 3 | 1 | 0 | 0 | — | | 28 | 5 |
| Sheffield Wednesday | 1995–96 | Premier League | 32 | 2 | 1 | 0 | 4 | 0 | 2 | 1 | 39 | 3 |
| Sheffield Wednesday | Total | | 109 | 10 | 13 | 3 | 19 | 0 | 6 | 2 | 147 | 15 |
| Falkirk | 1996–97 | Division One | 4 | 1 | 0 | 0 | 0 | 0 | — | | 4 | 1 |
| Bradford City | 1996–97 | First Division | 26 | 5 | 3 | 1 | 0 | 0 | — | | 29 | 6 |
| Sunderland | 1996–97 | Premier League | 7 | 1 | 0 | 0 | 0 | 0 | — | | 7 | 1 |
| Burnley | 1997–98 | Second Division | 32 | 1 | 2 | 0 | 2 | 1 | — | | 36 | 2 |
| Torquay United | 1998–99 | Third Division | 7 | 0 | 0 | 0 | 0 | 0 | — | | 7 | 0 |
| Career total | | | 600 | 119 | 57 | 16 | 51 | 7 | 26 | 6 | 734 | 148 |

=== International ===
Appearances and goals by national team and year
| National team | Year | Apps | Goals |
|---|---|---|---|
| England | 1985 | 11 | 1 |
| England | 1986 | 12 | 2 |
| England | 1987 | 6 | 1 |
| England | 1988 | 9 | 0 |
| England | 1989 | 10 | 2 |
| England | 1990 | 13 | 0 |
| England | 1991 | 1 | 0 |
| Total | | 62 | 6 |

== Honours ==
Tottenham Hotspur

- FA Cup runner-up: 1986–87

Marseille

- Division 1: 1989–90, 1990–91, 1991–92
- Coupe de France runner-up: 1990–91
- European Cup runner-up: 1990–91

Sheffield Wednesday

- FA Cup runner-up: 1992–93
- Football League Cup runner-up: 1992–93

Individual

- PFA Team of the Year: 1984–85 First Division, 1988–89 First Division
- North-East FWA Player of the Year: 1985
- Tottenham Hotspur Player of the Year: 1988
- Onze Mondial: 1990, 1991
- Onze d'Argent: 1991
- World XI: 1991
- FWA Footballer of the Year: 1992–93 (Sheffield Wednesday)
- Premier League Player of the Month: January 1995
- The Dream Team 110 years of OM: 2010

== Bibliography ==
- Dickinson, Jason; Brodie, John (2005). The Wednesday Boys: A Definitive Who's Who of Sheffield Wednesday Football Club 1880–2005. Sheffield: Pickard Communication. ISBN 0-9547264-9-9.
