= 1989–90 Coupe de France =

Tournament details
- Country: France

Final positions
- Champions: Montpellier
- Runners-up: RC Paris

Tournament statistics
- Top goal scorer(s): Patrick Cubaynes; Mario Relmy (5 goals)

The Coupe de France 1989–90 was its 73rd edition. It was won by Montpellier HSC.

== Round of 64 ==
Team 1	Score	Team 2
Alès (D2)	1–0	Toulouse (D1)
Lille (D1)	3–0	Reims (D2)
Rennes (D2)	1–0	Saint-Seurin (D2)
Marseille (D1)	4–0	Tours (D2)
Toulon (D1)	4–1	Aix (D4)
Sedan (D3)	2–1	Beauvais (D2)
Metz (D1)	6–0	Montceau (D2)
Orléans (D2)	2–1	Le Havre (D2)
Auxerre (D1)	1–0	Red Star (D2)
Épinal (D3)	2–1	Lens (D2)
Nantes (D1)	2–0	Cholet (D4)
Nancy (D2)	2–1	Nice (D1)
Mulhouse (D1)	2–0	Orne 1919 (DHR)
Montpellier (D1)	1–0	Istres (D2)
Rouen (D2)	3–1	Roanne (D4)
Martigues (D2)	3–1	Bastia (D2)
Strasbourg (D2)	2–0	Sochaux (D1)
Louhans-Cuiseaux (D2)	1–0	Olympique Pavilly (DH)
Avignon (D2)	3–2 (a.e.t.)	Monaco (D1)
Laval (D2)	1–0	La Roche (D2)
Gueugnon (D1)	0–0 (a.e.t.) (4–3 p)	Créteil (D2)
Nîmes (D2)	1–0	Lyon (D1)
Cannes (D1)	1–1 (a.e.t.) (4–3 p)	Perpignan (D3)
Brest (D1)	4–2	Saintes (D4)
Bordeaux (D1)	4–0	Plabennec (DSR)
Gazélec Ajaccio (D3)	1–0	Caen (D1)
Saint-Étienne (D1)	2–1	Angoulême (D3)
RC Paris (D1)	3–2 (a.e.t.)	Angers (D2)
Saint-Lô (D3)	2–2 (a.e.t.) (7–6 p)	Niort (D2)
Chaumont (D2)	2–1	Épernay (D4)
Clermont (D3)	2–1	Saint-Pierroise (Réu.)
Valenciennes (D2)	1–0	Paris Saint-Germain (D1)

== Round of 32 ==
Team 1	Score	Team 2
Toulon (D1)	0–0 (a.e.t.) (5–6 p)	Valenciennes (D2)
Metz (D1)	1–1 (a.e.t.) (4–2 p)	Rennes (D2)
Cannes (D1)	2–0	Alès (D2)
Montpellier (D1)	5–1	Louhans-Cuiseaux (D2)
Nantes (D1)	2–1	Auxerre (D1)
Mulhouse (D1)	1–1 (a.e.t.) (5–4 p)	Strasbourg (D2)
Saint-Étienne (D1)	1–0	Chaumont (D2)
Lille (D1)	2–0	Nancy (D2)
Brest (D1)	0–1	Avignon (D2)
Saint-Lô (D3)	0–8	Bordeaux (D1)
Gazélec Ajaccio (D3)	1–3	Marseille (D1)
Sedan (D3)	0–2	RC Paris (D1)
Orléans (D2)	1–0	Épinal (D3)
Gueugnon (D2)	1–0	Laval (D2)
Rouen (D2)	0–1 (a.e.t.)	Nîmes (D2)
Martigues (D2)	3–0 (a.e.t.)	Clermont (D3)

== Round of 16 ==
Team 1	Score	Team 2
Bordeaux (D1)	4–0	Metz (D1)
Montpellier (D1)	2–0	Nantes (D1)
Lille (D1)	0–0 (a.e.t.) (4–5 p)	Cannes (D1)
RC Paris (D1)	5–0	Gueugnon (D2)
Marseille (D1)	2–0	Nîmes (D2)
Valenciennes (D2)	3–4 (a.e.t.)	Saint-Étienne (D1)
Martigues (D2)	0–2	Mulhouse (D1)
Avignon (D2)	2–1	Orléans (D2)

== Quarter-finals ==
2 May 1990	Mulhouse (1)	2–2 (a.e.t.) (6–7 p)	Saint-Étienne (1)	Mulhouse
	Stojković 77'; Slišković 104'		Witschge 81'; Mendy 91'	Stadium: Stade de l'Ill; Attendance: 7,000; Referee: Gérard Biguet

2 May 1990	RC Paris (1)	1–1 (a.e.t.) (5–4 p)	Bordeaux (1)	Paris
	Sobrinho 89'		den Boer 78' (pen.)	Stadium: Stade Yves-du-Manoir; Attendance: 9,355; Referee: Michel Girard

2 May 1990	Cannes (1)	0–3	Marseille (1)	Cannes
			Sauzée 111'; Vercruysse 113'; Waddle 120'	Stadium: Stade Pierre de Coubertin; Attendance: 13,000; Referee: Philippe Leduc

2 May 1990	Avignon (2)	0–1	Montpellier (1)	Avignon
			Guérin 85'	Stadium: Parc des Sports; Attendance: 10,000; Referee: Jean-Marie Lartigot

== Semi-finals ==
24 May 1990	Saint-Étienne (1)	0–1	Montpellier (1)	Saint-Étienne
			Cantona 36'	Stadium: Stade Geoffroy-Guichard; Attendance: 35,421; Referee: Joël Quiniou

25 May 1990	Marseille (1)	2–3	RC Paris (1)	Marseille
	Germain 3'; Sauzée 61'		Bouderbala 37'; Milojevic 83'; Aïd 88'	Stadium: Stade Vélodrome; Attendance: 30,660; Referee: Michel Girard

== Final ==
2 June 1990
20:00

Montpellier	2–1 (a.e.t.)	RC Paris
Blanc 103'; Ferhaoui 108'		Ginola 109'

Parc des Princes, Paris
Attendance: 44,067
Referee: Gérard Biguet
