= Hippolyte Dangbeto =

French footballer (born 1969)

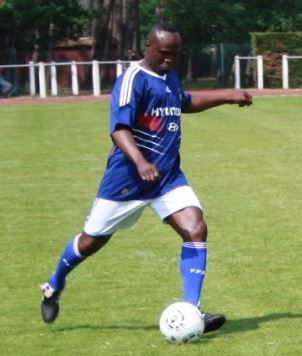

Personal information
- Date of birth: 2 November 1969 (age 56)
- Place of birth: Grand-Popo, Benin
- Height: 1.74 m (5 ft 9 in)
- Position: Full-back

Senior career*
Years	Team	Apps	(Gls)
1988–1990	RC Paris	44	(0)
1990–1995	Caen	179	(8)
1995–1997	Perpignan CFC	71	(1)
1997–1998	Troyes	36	(0)
1998–1999	Sedan	30	(0)

International career
1990–1991	France U21	8	(0)
- * Club domestic league appearances and goals

Hippolyte Dangbeto (born 2 November 1969) is a former professional footballer who played as a full-back. Born in Benin, he represented France at youth level.

== Career ==
Dangbeto moved to France with his family at age 8. He began playing youth football with the local club in Trappes before turning professional with RC Paris.

He represented France at under-21 level in 1990 and 1991.

He played on the professional level in Ligue 1 for RC Paris and Caen, then in French Ligue 2 for Perpignan CFC, Troyes and Sedan.

He played in the 1990 and 1999 Coupe de France Finals, but his team lost each of the two.
