= Étienne Mendy =

French footballer (born 1969)

Personal information
- Date of birth: 14 June 1969 (age 57)
- Place of birth: Saint-Quentin, France
- Height: 1.80 m (5 ft 11 in)
- Position: Forward

Senior career*
Years	Team	Apps	(Gls)
1985–1988	Beauvais		
1988–1994	Saint-Étienne	146	(35)
1994–1996	Sochaux	51	(24)
1996–1998	Caen	48	(14)
1998–1999	Nîmes	24	(5)
Total		269	(78)
- * Club domestic league appearances and goals

Étienne Mendy (born 14 June 1969) is a French former professional footballer who played 174 times in Ligue 1 and 114 times in Ligue 2. Mendy played for Nîmes, Caen, Sochaux, Saint Etienne and Beauvais between 1985 and 1999.

Following his retirement as a player Mendy became an agent for other players.
