= Jean-Pierre Papin =

French football manager (born 1963)

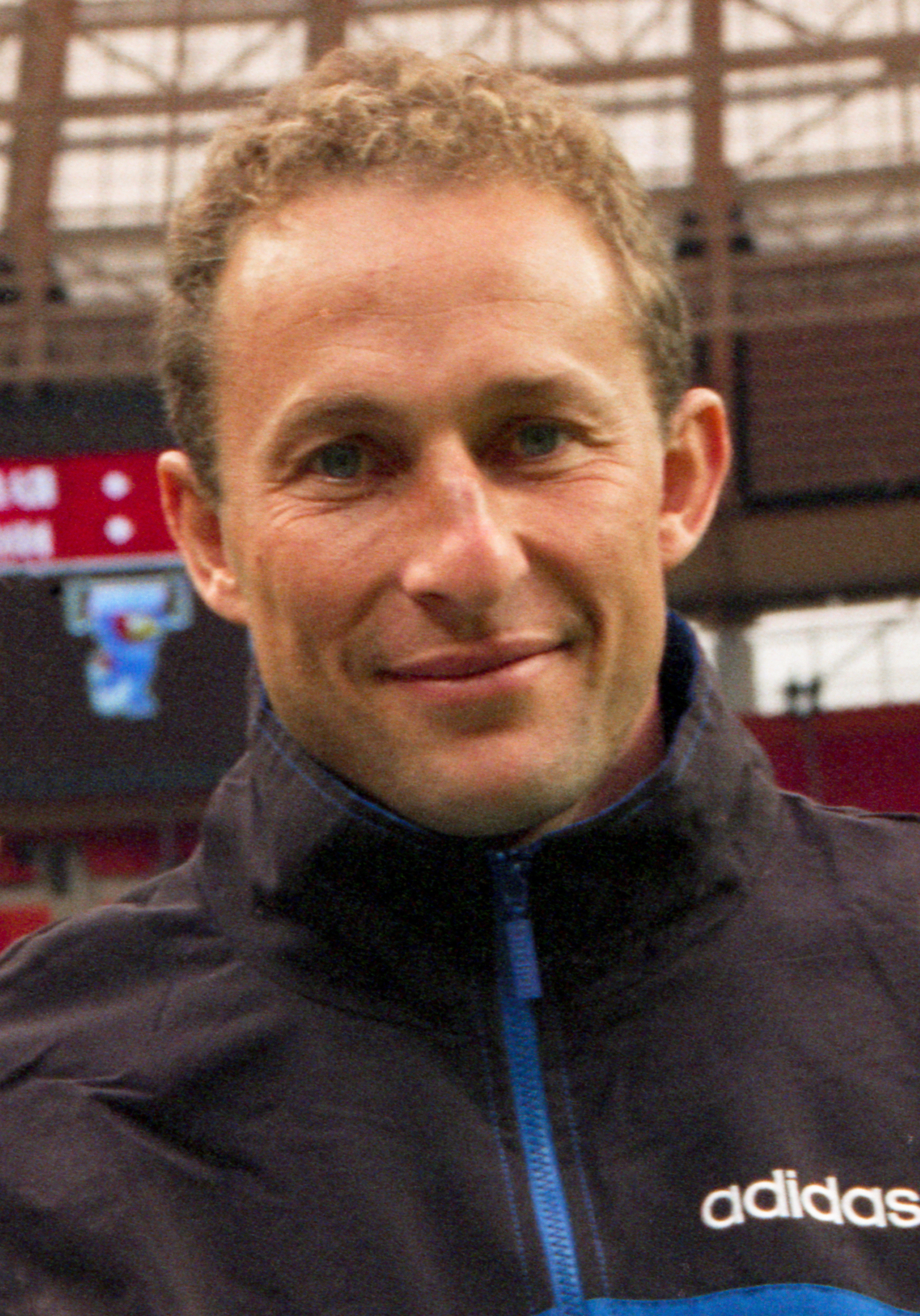
- Papin in 1997

Personal information
- Full name: Jean-Pierre Roger Guillaume Papin
- Date of birth: 5 November 1963 (age 62)
- Place of birth: Boulogne-sur-Mer, Pas-de-Calais, France
- Height: 1.76 m (5 ft 9 in)
- Position: Striker

Youth career
- 1969–1978: Jeumont
- 1978–1980: Trith-Saint-Léger
- 1980–1981: Valenciennes
- 1981–1984: INF Vichy

Senior career*
Years	Team	Apps	(Gls)
1981–1984	INF Vichy	49	(13)
1984–1985	Valenciennes	33	(15)
1985–1986	Club Brugge	33	(21)
1986–1992	Marseille	214	(134)
1992–1994	AC Milan	40	(18)
1994–1996	Bayern Munich	27	(3)
1996–1998	Bordeaux	55	(22)
1998–1999	Guingamp	10	(3)
1999–2001	JS Saint-Pierroise	27	(13)
2001–2004	US Lège-Cap-Ferret	57	(24)
Total		545	(266)

International career
1985–1986	France U21	4	(3)
1986–1995	France	54	(30)

Managerial career
- 2004–2006: Arcachon
- 2006–2007: Strasbourg
- 2007–2008: Lens
- 2009–2010: Châteauroux
- 2014–2015: Bassin d'Arcachon
- 2020–2022: C'Chartres
- 2023–2025: Marseille B
Medal record
Men's football
Representing France
FIFA World Cup
Third place	1986
- * Club domestic league appearances and goals

Jean-Pierre Roger Guillaume Papin (French pronunciation: [ʒɑ̃pjɛʁ ʁɔʒɛ ɡijom papɛ̃]; born 5 November 1963) is a French football manager and former professional player who played as a forward. He was most recently the head coach of the reserve team of Olympique de Marseille. He won the Ballon d'Or in 1991.

Papin was included in the FIFA 100, a list of the greatest living footballers, published in 2004 for the centenary of the FIFA, signed by Pelé. He was named one of the best European footballers on the occasion of the fiftieth anniversary of the UEFA in 2004. He is famous in particular for his first-time strikes from distance, his overhead kicks, and his volleys, which are known as Papinades. The nickname of JPP was given to him by supporters and journalists.

Trained at Jeumont, Papin signed his first professional contract in 1984 at Valenciennes. Recruited by Brugge, he won the Belgian Cup and went on to be selected for the French team for the 1986 FIFA World Cup. Signed by Marseille, he experienced the pinnacle of his career as he won Ligue 1 titles with Marseille in 1989, 1990, 1991 and 1992; the Coupe de France in 1989; and reached the final of the UEFA Champions League in 1991. In 1992, he left Olympique de Marseille for AC Milan in a record transfer; he won Serie A in 1994 and the UEFA Champions League. He joined Bayern Munich, where he won the UEFA Cup in 1996. He returned to France, to Bordeaux, where he was a finalist in the Coupe de la Ligue in 1997 and 1998 and then ended his professional career at Guingamp.

Capped 54 times, and captained 11 times, Papin played in the French team which reached the 1986 World Cup semifinal. France failed to qualify for either the 1988 European Championships or the 1990 World Cup but he was part of the team for the Euro 1992. Injuries and the emergence of the Zinedine Zidane generation saw his international career come to an end in the mid-1990s.

In 1996, after their eight-month-old daughter was shown to have serious cerebral lesions, Jean-Pierre and his wife set up an association "Neuf de Coeur" (Nine of Hearts; Papin's shirt number was 9) to help others in that situation and, particularly, to find and apply methods to mentally and physically educate such children.

== Early life ==
Jean-Pierre Roger Guillaume Papin was born on 5 November 1963 in Boulogne-sur-Mer, Pas-de-Calais, the son of professional footballer Guy Papin. After his parents divorced, he moved to live with his grandmother in Germont, a French city located near the Belgian border.

== Club career ==
=== Valenciennes ===
At age 15, Papin started his professional career with Valenciennes, in Northern France, before moving to Club Brugge in Belgium.

=== Brugge ===
Papin had a successful season at Club Brugge, scoring 32 goals in 43 games. Although he only played one season for Club Brugge, he was elected as its greatest ever foreign player by the supporters in 2008.

=== Marseille ===
During Papin's time at Marseille, the club won four consecutive French league championships between 1989 and 1992, completed a league and cup double in 1989, and reached the final of the European Cup in 1991, losing to Red Star Belgrade on penalties.

During this period, Papin scored 181 goals in 279 games and was the league's top scorer for five consecutive seasons (from 1988 to 1992). While at Marseille he won the Ballon d'Or, awarded to Europe's top footballer, in 1991.

=== AC Milan ===
In July 1992, Papin joined Italian giants AC Milan for a world record fee of £10 million, and was the first high-profile French player to join the Italian league since Michel Platini. However, he never established himself as a regular first team member with the Rossoneri due to injuries and adaptation problems. As a foreign player in the Pre-Bosman rule era, Papin also suffered from the three-foreigner rule that made him compete for playing time with other foreign players.

He entered as a substitute during the 1993 Champions League final in which Milan lost to his former club, Marseille. He won the Champions League in the next year, but did not play in the final. Nevertheless, Papin has kept good memories of his spell in Italy and frequently cites former Milan managers Fabio Capello and Arrigo Sacchi as his models when coaching is concerned.

=== Bayern Munich ===
In 1994, he was transferred to Bayern Munich for £2.1 million, but his first season was once again plagued by injuries. In his second season in Germany he was part of the side that won the UEFA Cup against Bordeaux, a club that Papin would join the following season. He was twice linked with clubs in England later in his playing career. First, in March 1994, he was a transfer target for Premier League side Tottenham Hotspur. Towards the end of his spell with Bordeaux in 1998, he was a target for ambitious Fulham, then a Division Two (third tier) side, and even expressed his desire to sign for the club. However, neither transfer ever happened and Papin finished his career without having spent any time in England.

=== Bordeaux ===
With Bordeaux, he lost the 1997 Coupe de la Ligue final against Strasbourg and lost the 1998 Coupe de la Ligue final.

=== Guingamp ===
Papin's professional career ended in 1998 with Second Division side Guingamp.

=== Later career ===
Papin finished his career as a player in the amateur club US Cap-Ferret between 2001 and 2004. Then, after five years of managing, he played in another amateur club, AS Facture-Biganos Boïen.

== International career ==
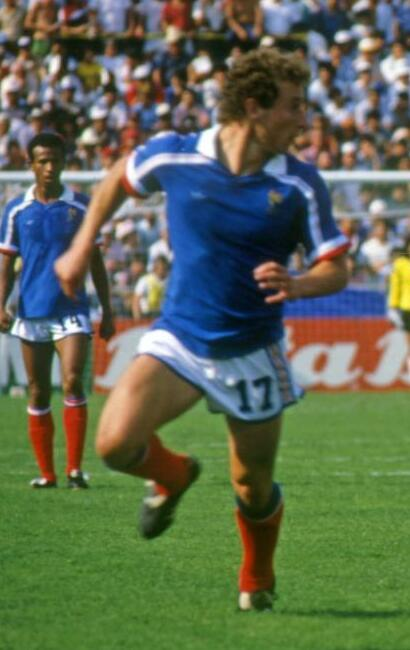
Papin playing for France at the 1986 FIFA World Cup

Papin was selected for the first time in the French team during the Toulon Tournament in 1985 in Marseille with the number 14, alongside Pascal Baills, Stéphane Paille, Gérald Passi, Franck Sauzée, Vincent Cobos and Jean-Christophe Thomas. The France team won the Toulon Tournament and successively defeated Spain (Jon Andoni Goikoetxea), Romania (Gheorghe Popescu), Ivory Coast (Joël Tiéhi) and England (Martin Allen). Papin finished as the tournament's top scorer and it was during the match against Spain that Papin scored his first official goal at the Stade Vélodrome.

Papin earned his first cap in a friendly match against Northern Ireland in February 1986 and appeared at the 1986 World Cup. He scored twice in four games: first during France opening game against Canada (1–0) and then during France's victory against Belgium (4–2), helping France finish third.

He did not appear at the 1990 World Cup because France failed to qualify, but during the qualifying campaign for UEFA Euro 1992 he finished second top scorer in the Qualifiers of the 1992 European Football Championship with nine goals behind Darko Pančev and the France team is the only one to win all its playoff matches, a first in Europe and this in a very strong group with two quarter-finalists of the previous World Cup, Spain and Czechoslovakia. Papin who suffers from the aftermath of an ankle injury cannot prevent France from failing in the first round, despite scoring two goals in three games

The French football team, trained by Gérard Houllier, played in the 1994 World Cup qualifiers but got off to a bad start (2–0 defeat in Bulgaria), but a series of 6 wins against Austria (twice), Finland (twice), Sweden and Israel put them back at the top of the group and in a very favorable position for qualification with three rounds to go. The French team, undermined by internal quarrels (Marseille-Paris rivalry), however collapsed in the final sprint by conceding a draw in Sweden (1–1 on a defensive error three minutes from the end) and during the two last games played at home, where they only had to beat Israel or not lose against Bulgaria, to score the ticket for the United States. The Blues lost against the weakest team in the group, Israel (2–3 on a goal by Atar 30 seconds from the end of the match), then against Bulgaria (1–2 on a goal by Emil Kostadinov two seconds the end of regulation time), this goal depriving France of participation in the World Cup. The two qualifiers of this group 6, Sweden and Bulgaria, would reach the semi-finals of the World Cup in July 1994.

Papin initially said goodbye to the Blues of which he was the captain after the elimination in qualifying for the 1994 World Cup, before being convinced by Aimé Jacquet to return. He scored his last goal in selection at Trebizond in Turkey (match relocated because of troubles in Azerbaijan) against Azerbaijan (2–0) at the end of 1994. Papin played his last international match against the Netherlands in January 1995, before injuries and the emergence of the Zinedine Zidane generation permanently removed him from the selection.

== Style of play ==
Papin has been described as "a fast and lethal striker, who made goal scoring his signature for club and country" and a player who could score in a variety of situation, "from neat, chipped finishes, low drives into the corner, towering headers and, in particular, thumping volleys."

During his career, the term Papinade was used to describe powerful volleys from difficult angles.

== Managerial career ==
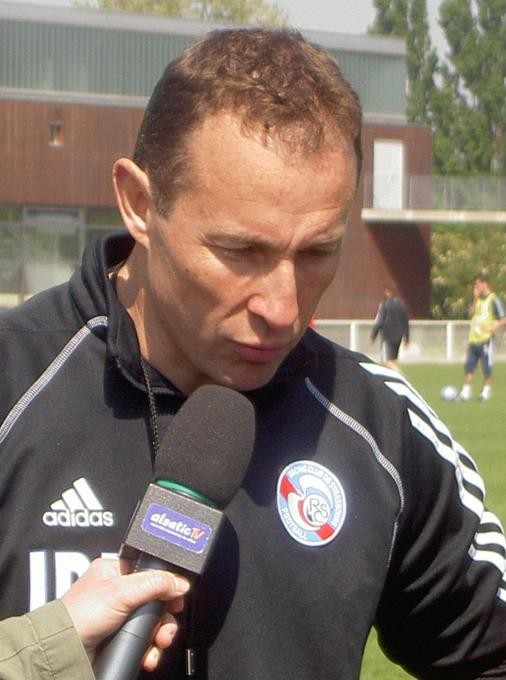
Papin as Strasbourg manager in 2006

In May 2006, Papin took over from Jacky Duguépéroux as the new coach of Strasbourg, who were relegated to the Second Division. He had previously been coaching Arcachon, an amateur team, and helped them to be promoted from CFA 2 to CFA.

In 2006–07, he guided Strasbourg back to Ligue 1 with a third-placed finish but came under pressure shortly after the end of the season when internal conflicts at the club surfaced in the press. Several players, including '05 league cup final hero Jean-Christophe Devaux, also openly criticized Papin's methods.

Initially confirmed as manager for the 2007–08 season, he was forced to resign a week later after it was revealed that he had interviewed for the vacant managerial job at Lens only hours after his confirmation at Strasbourg. He was replaced by Jean-Marc Furlan, former manager of Troyes, while Lens selected Guy Roux as their new manager. Ironically, Papin eventually became the manager of Lens after the club lost at Strasbourg, as Roux resigned only five games into the 2007–08 season. In the midst of the season, Lens and Papin were fighting to avoid relegation to the Second Division. Lens was also eliminated in the first round of both the UEFA cup and the Coupe de France by, respectively, FC Copenhagen (1–1; 1–2) and Second Division side Chamois Niortais (0–1, at home).

On 29 December 2009, Châteauroux hired the coach to replace Dominique Bijotat. He left his position in May 2010 and was replaced by Didier Tholot.

For the 2014–15 season, Papin once again took the managerial position at FC Bassin d'Archachon in Championnat de France Amateur 2.

On 2 June 2020, Papin was announced as the new manager of Championnat National 2 side C'Chartres.

He left his position in October 2022 to go back to Marseille as a technical advisor.

== Outside football ==
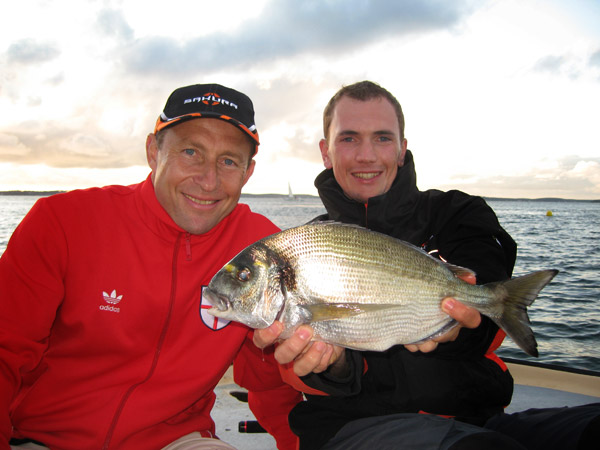
Papin (left) with sport fisherman Guillaume Fourrier in 2009

Papin was also iconic in French pop culture because of his caricature in the satirical TV puppet show Les Guignols de l'Info. At first, Papin was depicted as a rather dumb football player (a common stereotype in France), his only obsession being the many different ways to score goals. When Papin experienced difficulties in Italy, the coverage became more sympathetic, especially with the infamous Reviens JPP! song where even God Himself would urge Papin to come back to his home country, because "France needs you!".

After his daughter was diagnosed with cerebral palsy as an infant, Papin started running the Neuf de cœur (Nine of Hearts) foundation, which provides support to families affected by the neurological disorder.

Since 2011, he has participated in the Amélie evenings, organized by Amélie Mauresmo for the benefit of the Institut Curie on the theme play with the artists which happens at each opening of the Open GDF Suez at the Stade Pierre de Coubertin in Paris.

Since 2013, he has been with Youri Djorkaeff, Sylvain Wiltord and Valdo Filho, one of the ambassadors of Footgolf.

== Career statistics ==
=== Club ===
Appearances and goals by club, season and competition
Club	Season	League			National cup (Note: Includes Belgian Cup, Coupe de France, Coppa Italia, DFB-Pokal)		League cup (Note: Includes Coupe de la Ligue)		Europe		Other		Total	
Club	Season	Division	Apps	Goals	Apps	Goals	Apps	Goals	Apps	Goals	Apps	Goals	Apps	Goals
INF Vichy	1981–82	Division 3	17	3	0	0	—		—		—		17	3
INF Vichy	1982–83	Division 3	3	0	1	0	—		—		—		4	0
INF Vichy	1983–84	Division 3	29	10	0	0	—		—		—		29	10
INF Vichy	Total		49	13	1	0	—		—		—		50	13
Valenciennes	1984–85	Division 2	33	15	2	2	0	0	—		—		35	17
Club Brugge	1985–86	Belgian First Division	33	21	8	7	—		4 (Note: Appearances in UEFA Cup)	5	—		45	33
Marseille	1986–87	Division 1	33	13	7	1	4	2	—		—		44	16
Marseille	1987–88	Division 1	37	19	1	0	0	0	8 (Note: Appearances in European Cup Winners' Cup)	4	—		46	23
Marseille	1988–89	Division 1	35	22	10	11	0	0	—		—		46	33
Marseille	1989–90	Division 1	36	30	4	2	0	0	8 (Note: Appearances in European Cup)	6	—		48	38
Marseille	1990–91	Division 1	36	23	5	7	0	0	9	6	—		50	36
Marseille	1991–92	Division 1	37	27	4	4	0	0	4	7	—		45	38
Marseille	Total		214	134	31	25	4	2	29	23	—		278	184
AC Milan	1992–93	Serie A	22	13	4	4	—		7 (Note: Appearances in UEFA Champions League)	3	1 (Note: Appearance in Supercoppa Italiana)	0	34	20
AC Milan	1993–94	Serie A	18	5	2	0	—		6	4	3 (Note: Two appearances and one goal in UEFA Super Cup, one appearance and one goal in Intercontinental Cup)	2	29	11
AC Milan	Total		40	18	6	4	—		13	7	4	2	63	31
Bayern Munich	1994–95	Bundesliga	7	1	1	0	—		3	2	1 (Note: Appearance in DFL-Supercup)	0	12	3
Bayern Munich	1995–96	Bundesliga	20	2	2	0	—		6	1	—		28	3
Bayern Munich	Total		27	3	3	0	—		9	3	1	0	40	6
Bordeaux	1996–97	Division 1	32	16	2	0	4	0	—		—		38	16
Bordeaux	1997–98	Division 1	23	6	2	3	5	5	2	0	—		32	14
Bordeaux	Total		55	22	4	3	9	5	2	0	—		70	30
Guingamp	1998–99	Division 2	10	3	0	0	0	0	—		—		10	3
JS Saint-Pierroise	1999–00	Division d'Honneur	12	4	—		—		—		—		12	4
JS Saint-Pierroise	2000–01	Division d'Honneur	15	9	—		—		—		—		15	9
JS Saint-Pierroise	Total		27	13	—		—		—		—		27	13
US Lège-Cap-Ferret	2001–02	CFA 2	24	8	0	0	—		—		—		24	8
US Lège-Cap-Ferret	2002–03	CFA 2	17	7	2	0	—		—		—		19	7
US Lège-Cap-Ferret	2003–04	CFA 2	16	9	2	2	—		—		—		18	11
US Lège-Cap-Ferret	Total		57	24	4	2	—		—		—		61	26
Career total			545	266	59	43	13	7	57	38	5	2	679	356

=== International ===
Appearances and goals by national team and year
National team	Year	Apps	Goals
France	1986	8	2
France	1987	3	0
France	1988	6	1
France	1989	5	3
France	1990	5	4
France	1991	5	7
France	1992	10	7
France	1993	7	3
France	1994	4	3
France	1995	1	0
Total		54	30

Scores and results list France's goal tally first, score column indicates score after each Papin goal.

List of international goals scored by Jean-Pierre Papin
No.	Date	Venue	Opponent	Score	Result	Competition
1	1 June 1986	Estadio León, León, Mexico	Canada	1–0	1–0	1986 FIFA World Cup
2	28 June 1986	Estadio Cuauhtémoc, Puebla, Mexico	Belgium	2–1	4–2 (a.e.t.)	1986 FIFA World Cup
3	28 September 1988	Parc des Princes, Paris, France	Norway	1–0	1–0	1990 FIFA World Cup qualification
4	16 August 1989	Malmö Stadion, Malmö, Sweden	Sweden	2–1	4–2	Friendly
5	16 August 1989	Malmö Stadion, Malmö, Sweden	Sweden	3–2	4–2	Friendly
6	5 September 1989	Ullevaal Stadion, Oslo, Norway	Norway	1–0	1–1	1990 FIFA World Cup qualification
7	28 February 1990	Stade de la Mosson, Montpellier, France	West Germany	1–1	2–1	Friendly
8	5 September 1990	Laugardalsvöllur, Reykjavík, Iceland	Iceland	1–0	2–1	UEFA Euro 1992 qualifying
9	13 October 1990	Parc des Princes, Paris, France	Czechoslovakia	1–0	2–1	UEFA Euro 1992 qualifying
10	13 October 1990	Parc des Princes, Paris, France	Czechoslovakia	2–0	2–1	UEFA Euro 1992 qualifying
11	20 February 1991	Parc des Princes, Paris, France	Spain	2–1	3–1	UEFA Euro 1992 qualifying
12	30 March 1991	Parc des Princes, Paris, France	Albania	3–0	5–0	UEFA Euro 1992 qualifying
12	30 March 1991	Parc des Princes, Paris, France	Albania	4–0	5–0	UEFA Euro 1992 qualifying
14	14 August 1991	Stadion Miejski, Poznań, Poland	Poland	2–1	5–1	Friendly
15	4 September 1991	Tehelné Pole Stadium, Bratislava, Czechoslovakia	Czechoslovakia	1–1	2–1	UEFA Euro 1992 qualifying
16	4 September 1991	Tehelné Pole Stadium, Bratislava, Czechoslovakia	Czechoslovakia	2–1	2–1	UEFA Euro 1992 qualifying
17	12 October 1991	Estadio Benito Villamarín, Seville, Spain	Spain	2–0	2–1	UEFA Euro 1992 qualifying
18	25 March 1992	Parc des Princes, Paris, France	Belgium	1–1	3–3	Friendly
19	25 March 1992	Parc des Princes, Paris, France	Belgium	3–3	3–3	Friendly
20	5 June 1992	Stade Félix Bollaert, Lens, France	Netherlands	1–0	1–1	Friendly
21	10 June 1992	Råsunda Stadium, Solna, Sweden	Sweden	1–1	1–1	UEFA Euro 1992
22	17 June 1992	Malmö Stadion, Malmö, Sweden	Denmark	1–1	1–2	UEFA Euro 1992
23	14 October 1992	Parc des Princes, Paris, France	Austria	1–0	2–0	1994 FIFA World Cup qualification
24	14 November 1992	Parc des Princes, Paris, France	Finland	1–0	2–1	1994 FIFA World Cup qualification
25	27 March 1993	Ernst-Happel-Stadion, Vienna, Austria	Austria	1–0	1–0	1994 FIFA World Cup qualification
26	28 July 1993	Stade Michel d'Ornano, Caen, France	Russia	3–1	3–1	Friendly
27	8 September 1993	Ratina Stadion, Tampere, Estland	Finland	2–0	2–0	1994 FIFA World Cup qualification
28	22 March 1994	Stade de Gerland, Lyon, France	Chile	1–0	3–1	Friendly
29	29 May 1994	National Stadium, Tokyo, Japan	Japan	2–0	4–1	1994 Kirin Cup
30	13 December 1994	Hüseyin Avni Aker Stadium, Trabzon, Turkey	Azerbaijan	1–0	2–0	UEFA Euro 1996 qualifying

== Honours ==
INF Vichy

- Division 3: 1982–83

Club Brugge

- Belgian Cup: 1985–86

Marseille

- Division 1: 1988–89, 1989–90, 1990–91, 1991–92
- Coupe de France: 1988–89
- European Cup runner-up: 1990–91
- Coupe de France runner-up: 1986–87, 1990–91

AC Milan

- Serie A: 1992–93, 1993–94
- Supercoppa Italiana: 1992
- UEFA Champions League: 1993–94; runner-up: 1992–93
- Intercontinental Cup runner-up: 1993
- European Super Cup runner-up: 1993

Bayern Munich

- UEFA Cup: 1995–96
- DFL-Supercup runner-up: 1994

Bordeaux

- Coupe de la Ligue runner-up: 1996–97, 1997–98

France U21

- Toulon Tournament: 1985

France

- Kirin Cup: 1994
- FIFA World Cup third place: 1986

Individual

- Ballon d'Or: 1991
- Onze d'Or: 1991
- French Player of the Year: 1989, 1991
- European player of the year El Pais: 1991
- FIFA World Player of the Year: Silver award 1991
- IFFHS World's Top Goal Scorer: 1991
- Onze de Bronze: 1989, 1990, 1992
- Goal of the Year (Germany): 1995
- World XI: 1997, 1998, 1999
- FIFA 100: 2004
- Named best foreign player of Club Brugge ever: 2008
- Named player of the century of Marseille: 2009
- UNFP 20 years Special Team Trophy: 2011
- UNFP Oscar trophy: 1999
- Golden Foot Award Legends: 2013
- The Dream Team 110 years of Marseille: 2010
- 8th French Player of the Century: 2018
- Ligue 1 top scorer: 1987–88, 1988–89, 1989–90, 1990–91, 1991–92
- European Cup top scorer: 1989–90, 1990–91, 1991–92

Orders

- Knight of the Legion of Honour: 2005
- Officer of the National Order of Merit: 2025
