= Philippe Vercruysse =

French footballer (born 1962)

Personal information
- Date of birth: 28 January 1962 (age 64)
- Place of birth: Saumur, France
- Height: 1.84 m (6 ft 0 in)
- Position: Midfielder

Senior career*
Years	Team	Apps	(Gls)
1980–1986	Lens	248	(59)
1986–1987	Bordeaux	29	(8)
1988	Lens	20	(4)
1988–1991	Marseille	134	(42)
1991–1993	Nîmes	59	(14)
1993–1994	Bordeaux	35	(9)
1994–1995	Metz	26	(4)
1995–1996	Sion	38	(23)
1997	Lens	12	(1)
1997–1998	Al Nassr		
1998–2000	Étoile Carouge	34	(22)

International career
1983–1989	France	12	(1)
Medal record
Representing France
CONMEBOL–UEFA Cup of Champions
Winner	1985 France
- * Club domestic league appearances and goals

Philippe Vercruysse (born 28 January 1962) is a French former professional footballer who played as a midfielder.

== International career ==
Vercruysse earned a total number of twelve international caps (one goal) for the France national team during the 1980s and was a member of the team in the 1986 FIFA World Cup.

== Honours ==
Marseille

- Division 1: 1988–89, 1989–90, 1990–91
- European Cup runner-up: 1990–91
- Coupe de France runner-up: 1990–91
