= Pascal Baills =

French footballer (born 1964)

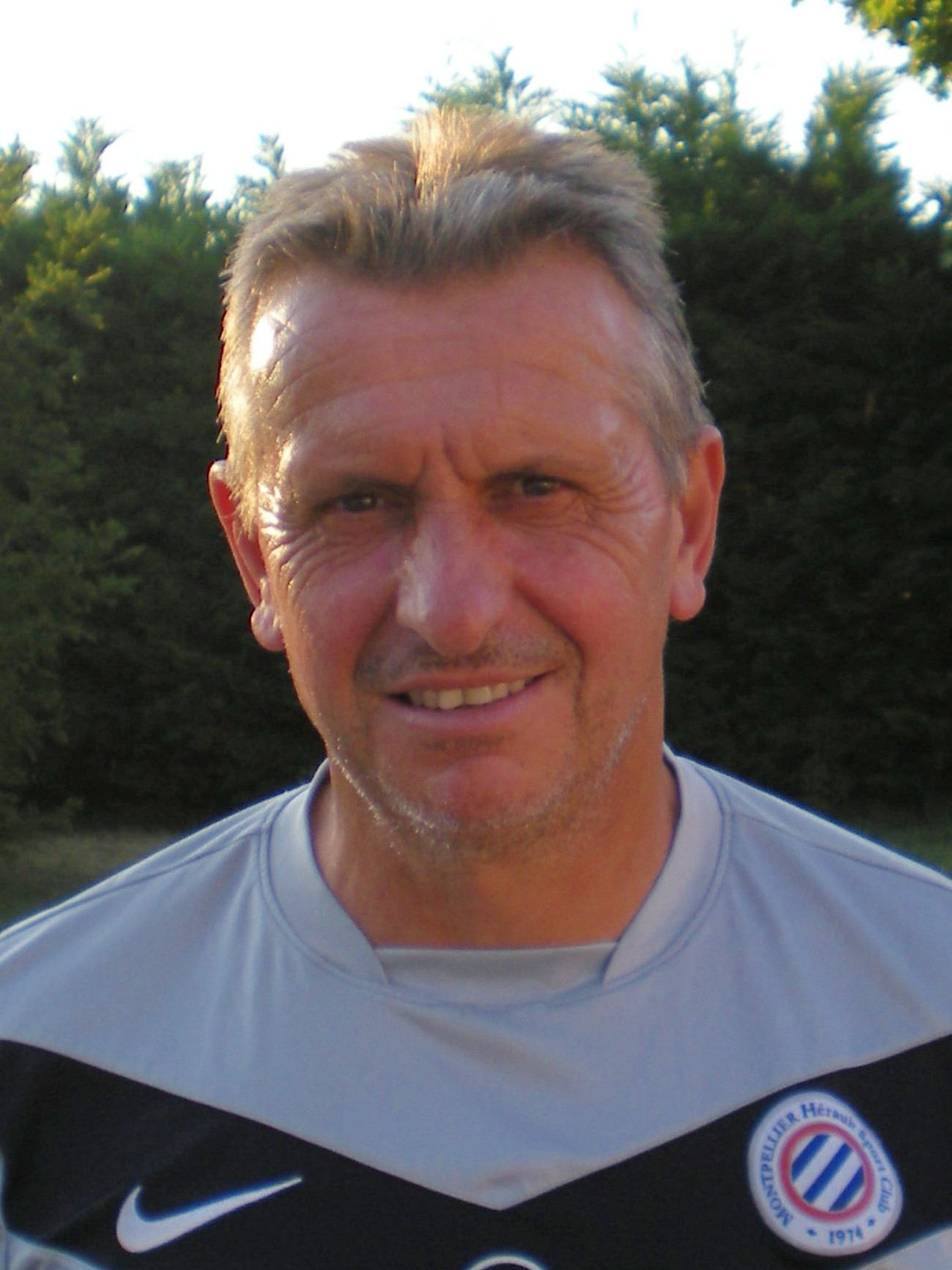

Personal information
- Full name: Pascal Baills
- Date of birth: 30 December 1964 (age 61)
- Place of birth: Perpignan, France
- Height: 1.80 m (5 ft 11 in)
- Position: Defender

Senior career*
Years	Team	Apps	(Gls)
1983–1991	Montpellier	240	(7)
1991–1992	Marseille	17	(0)
1992–1995	Strasbourg	101	(3)
1995–2000	Montpellier	127	(1)

International career
1991	France	1	(0)

Managerial career
- 2002–2004: Montpellier (assistant)
- 2004: Montpellier (U17)
- 2006–2016: Montpellier (assistant)
- 2013: Montpellier (caretaker)
- 2015–2016: Montpellier (caretaker)
- * Club domestic league appearances and goals

Pascal Baills (born 30 December 1964) is a French former professional footballer who played as a defender. He won one cap for the France national team.

He became assistant coach to Jean-Francois Domergue and subsequently Rolland Courbis at Montpellier HSC. In 2009, he became assistant to Montpellier's coach René Girard and the club won the championship of France in 2012.

== Honours ==
=== As a player ===
Montpellier

- Coupe de France: 1990

Marseille

- French championship: 1992

=== As assistant coach ===
Montpellier

- French championship: 2012
