= 1989–90 French Division 1 =

52nd season of French Division 1

Division 1
- Season: 1989–90
- Champions: Marseille (6th title)
- Relegated: Racing Paris; Mulhouse
- European Cup: Marseille
- UEFA Cup: Bordeaux; Monaco
- Cup Winners' Cup: Montpellier
- Matches: 380
- Goals: 863 (2.27 per match)
- Top goalscorer: Jean-Pierre Papin (30)

Olympique de Marseille won Division 1 season 1989–90 of the French Association Football League with 53 points.

== Participating teams ==
- Auxerre
- Bordeaux
- Stade Brest
- SM Caen
- AS Cannes
- Lille
- Olympique Lyonnais
- Olympique Marseille
- FC Metz
- AS Monaco
- Montpellier HSC
- FC Mulhouse
- FC Nantes Atlantique
- OGC Nice
- RC Paris
- Paris Saint-Germain FC
- AS Saint-Etienne
- FC Sochaux-Montbéliard
- Sporting Toulon Var
- Toulouse FC
Location of teams in 1989–90 Division 1

== League table ==
Pos	Team	Pld	W	D	L	GF	GA	GD	Pts	Qualification or relegation
1	Marseille (C)	38	22	9	7	75	34	+41	53	Qualification to European Cup first round
2	Bordeaux	38	22	7	9	51	25	+26	51	Qualification to UEFA Cup first round
3	Monaco	38	15	16	7	38	24	+14	46	Qualification to UEFA Cup first round
4	Sochaux	38	17	9	12	46	39	+7	43	
5	Paris Saint-Germain	38	18	6	14	50	48	+2	42	
6	Auxerre	38	14	13	11	49	40	+9	41	
7	Nantes	38	13	14	11	42	34	+8	40	
8	Lyon	38	14	11	13	43	41	+2	39	
9	Toulouse	38	13	12	13	39	39	0	38	
10	Brest	38	15	8	15	39	44	−5	38	
11	Cannes	38	12	12	14	44	50	−6	36	
12	Toulon	38	12	11	15	35	50	−15	35	
13	Montpellier	38	12	10	16	49	48	+1	34	Qualification to Cup Winners' Cup first round (Note: Montpellier qualified for the 1990–91 European Cup Winners' Cup as winners of the 1989–90 Coupe de France.)
14	Metz	38	8	18	12	33	36	−3	34	
15	Saint-Étienne	38	11	12	15	38	46	−8	34	
16	Caen	38	12	10	16	34	48	−14	34	
17	Lille	38	12	9	17	43	52	−9	33	
18	Nice (O)	38	9	13	16	34	48	−14	31	Qualification to relegation play-offs
19	Racing Paris (R)	38	10	10	18	39	59	−20	30	Administratively relegated to French Division 3 [fr]
20	Mulhouse (R)	38	9	10	19	42	58	−16	28	Relegation to French Division 2

Source: Histoire du PSG
Rules for classification: 1) points; 2) goal difference; 3) number of goals scored.
Victory: 2 points, Draw: 1 point, Defeat: 0 points
(C) Champions; (O) Play-off winners; (R) Relegated
Notes:

Promoted from Division 2, who will play in Division 1 season 1990/1991

- AS Nancy: Champion of Division 2, winner of Division 2 group A
- Stade Rennais: Runner-up, winner of Division 2 group B

== Results ==
Home \ Away	AUX	BOR	BRE	CAE	CAN	LIL	OL	OM	MET	ASM	MHS	MUL	FCN	NIC	PSG	RCP	STE	SOC	SCT	TFC
Auxerre		1–1	3–1	3–0	1–0	3–0	0–1	0–2	1–1	0–0	2–1	3–1	0–0	1–0	2–0	2–0	2–1	1–1	2–0	2–2
Bordeaux	0–1		3–0	2–1	2–0	3–1	2–0	3–0	1–0	0–0	2–0	1–0	3–0	3–0	3–0	4–0	1–0	1–0	2–1	2–1
Brest	2–1	2–0		2–1	2–0	1–0	0–2	2–1	2–0	1–1	1–1	2–0	3–2	3–0	0–1	2–0	0–0	1–0	2–1	0–0
Caen	1–0	1–0	2–1		1–0	2–0	1–1	0–2	1–0	1–1	3–2	1–0	2–0	1–1	2–0	1–0	3–2	1–1	2–2	0–1
Cannes	2–2	3–0	1–1	3–1		3–0	2–1	2–2	1–0	0–0	1–1	4–1	2–1	1–0	3–1	3–1	0–0	1–1	0–0	2–2
Lille	2–1	0–1	1–2	1–0	2–1		0–0	2–0	2–1	1–1	1–0	1–1	1–0	1–1	2–0	2–1	2–2	5–0	3–0	3–0
Lyon	1–1	0–0	4–0	2–1	0–1	2–1		1–4	0–0	0–2	3–1	3–1	0–0	2–0	1–2	1–1	0–0	0–4	3–2	3–0
Marseille	1–1	2–0	1–0	1–0	1–1	4–1	0–1		2–1	2–2	2–0	3–1	1–0	3–0	2–1	4–1	2–0	6–1	3–0	6–1
Metz	2–1	0–0	1–1	0–0	2–2	1–1	2–3	3–2		1–0	1–0	1–1	1–1	0–0	0–1	0–0	1–0	2–0	0–0	3–0
Monaco	2–4	2–0	2–0	2–1	0–0	1–1	1–0	1–3	1–0		1–0	0–0	0–0	1–0	2–0	4–0	0–0	2–1	2–1	2–0
Montpellier	1–0	1–2	1–1	5–1	4–1	5–0	2–0	1–1	1–2	0–0		3–3	2–1	1–0	2–0	2–1	3–3	2–0	3–0	1–0
Mulhouse	1–2	0–0	2–0	0–0	1–0	2–1	4–4	1–2	2–2	1–1	2–0		0–2	1–0	1–0	4–2	1–2	1–2	4–0	1–0
Nantes	2–1	2–1	1–0	0–0	1–0	1–0	2–1	0–0	0–0	0–0	1–1	3–2		2–2	0–1	5–1	2–0	0–1	4–0	0–1
Nice	1–1	1–0	0–1	1–0	2–0	1–1	1–0	1–1	0–0	1–0	3–0	2–0	1–2		3–3	2–0	1–3	2–4	1–2	1–1
Paris SG	1–1	1–1	3–1	3–1	5–1	2–1	0–1	2–1	1–0	2–1	2–1	1–0	2–2	2–1		1–2	2–0	1–0	1–1	0–1
Racing Paris	3–1	1–3	1–1	0–0	3–2	2–0	0–1	1–1	1–1	0–0	0–0	2–1	2–1	5–1	2–2		3–0	1–1	0–2	1–0
Saint-Étienne	4–1	1–1	2–0	0–0	1–0	2–1	1–0	0–0	4–3	0–2	1–0	3–0	0–0	0–0	1–2	0–1		0–2	1–2	0–3
Sochaux	0–0	2–0	1–0	5–0	3–0	1–0	1–0	0–2	0–0	1–0	3–1	0–0	1–3	1–1	1–0	2–0	2–3		1–0	1–0
Toulon	1–0	0–2	2–0	2–0	0–1	1–1	1–1	0–4	1–1	2–0	3–0	2–1	0–0	1–1	0–3	1–0	2–0	2–1		0–0
Toulouse	1–1	0–1	2–1	2–1	4–0	3–1	0–0	2–1	2–0	0–1	0–0	3–0	1–1	0–1	4–1	1–0	1–1	0–0	0–0	

Legend: Blue = home team win; Yellow = draw; Red = away team win.

== Relegation play-offs ==
Team 1	Agg.	Team 2	1st leg	2nd leg
Strasbourg	3–7	Nice	3–1	0–6

== Statistics ==
=== Top goalscorers ===
Rank	Player	Club	Goals
1	(France) Jean-Pierre Papin	Marseille	30
2	(Hungary) Kálmán Kovács	Auxerre	18
3	(Luxembourg) Robby Langers	Nice	17
4	(Socialist Federal Republic of Yugoslavia) Miloš Bursać	Toulon	16
5	(Argentina) Ramón Díaz	Monaco	15
5	(France) Fabrice Divert	Caen	15
7	(Germany) Klaus Allofs	Bordeaux	14
7	(Netherlands) Piet den Boer	Bordeaux	14
7	(France) Jean-Marc Ferreri	Bordeaux	14
7	(Morocco) Aziz Bouderbala	Racing Paris	14

== Attendances ==
#	Club	Average
1	Marseille	31,727
2	Girondins	20,032
3	Olympique lyonnais	19,827
4	Saint-Étienne	17,009
5	PSG	16,923
6	Nantes	12,961
7	MHSC	12,157
8	Toulouse	11,891
9	Metz	10,326
10	Caen	9,964
11	AJA	8,825
12	Racing	8,427
13	Brest	8,369
14	Nice	8,184
15	Toulon	7,595
16	Cannes	7,122
17	LOSC	7,103
18	Mulhouse	6,924
19	Monaco	5,400
20	Sochaux	5,185
