= Maccabi Tel Aviv F.C. in international football =

Israeli club in international football

- Club: Maccabi Tel Aviv F.C.
- First entry: 1969 Asian Champion Club Tournament (AFC); 1977 Intertoto Cup (UEFA)
- Matches: 188
- Largest win: 6–0 vs Zalgiris Vilnius (2001–02 UEFA Cup); 6–0 vs Željezničar (2011–12 UEFA Europa League)
- Largest loss: 0–6 vs Lyon (2025–26 UEFA Europa League)

Maccabi Tel Aviv have qualified for UEFA competitions on seventeen occasions. This list details their matches in the various competitions.

== History ==
Maccabi Tel Aviv's European history began in 1992 when the Israeli Football Association joined UEFA. 1992–93 was Maccabi's first European season. On 19 August 1992, Maccabi won 2-1 their first match against Valletta F.C. in Malta. Maccabi Tel Aviv qualified twice to the Champions League group stage in seasons 2004–05 and 2015–16. in 2013–14 and 2020–21 Europa League season Maccabi qualified to the Round of 32 stage. in 2023–24 Europa Conference League season Maccabi qualified to the Round of 16 stage.

== List of matches in European competitions ==
=== Before joining UEFA ===
Season	Competition	Round	Country	Opponent	Home	Away	Aggregate
1977	Intertoto Cup	Group stage	(Germany)	Duisburg	2–3	2–2	4th
1977	Intertoto Cup	Group stage	(Belgium)	Standard Liège	0–2	1–2	4th
1977	Intertoto Cup	Group stage	(Netherlands)	Twente	1–3	4–3	4th
1978	Intertoto Cup	Group stage	(Switzerland)	Zürich	0–2	3–0	3rd
1978	Intertoto Cup	Group stage	(Austria)	Admira Vienna	5–1	1–3	3rd
1978	Intertoto Cup	Group stage	(Sweden)	Malmö FF	0–1	1–3	3rd
1980	Intertoto Cup	Group stage	(Belgium)	Royal Antwerp	3–1	1–5	4th
1980	Intertoto Cup	Group stage	(Israel)	Maccabi Netanya	1–2	1–3	4th
1980	Intertoto Cup	Group stage	(Denmark)	KB	1–1	2–3	4th

=== After joining UEFA ===
Key

- P = preliminary round
- Q = qualification round
- R = round
- PO = Play-off round
- KOPO = Knockout round play-off

Season	Competition	Round	Country	Opponent	Home	Away	Aggregate
1992–93	Champions League	P	(Malta)	Valletta	1–0	2–1	3–1
1992–93	Champions League	R1	(Belgium)	Club Brugge	0–1	0–3	0–4
1993	Intertoto Cup	Group stage	(Czech Republic)	SK Slavia Prague	1–3 (Note: Match played in Winter Stadium)	—N/a	5th
1993	Intertoto Cup	Group stage	(Sweden)	Häcken	—N/a	0–4	5th
1993	Intertoto Cup	Group stage	(Denmark)	AaB	—N/a	1–2	5th
1993	Intertoto Cup	Group stage	(Germany)	Lokomotive Leipzig	0–0	—N/a	5th
1994–95	Cup Winners' Cup	Q	(Iceland)	Keflavík	4–1	2–1	6–2
1994–95	Cup Winners' Cup	R1	(Germany)	Werder Bremen	0–0	0–2	0–2
1995–96	Champions League	Q	(Switzerland)	Grasshopper	0–1	1–1	1–2
1996–97	Champions League	Q	(Turkey)	Fenerbahçe	0–1	1–1	1–2
1996–97	UEFA Cup	R1	(Spain)	Tenerife	1–1	2–3	3–4
1999–00	UEFA Cup	Q	(Lithuania)	FBK Kaunas	3–1	1–2	4–3
1999–00	UEFA Cup	R1	(France)	Lens	2–2	1–2	3–4
2001–02	UEFA Cup	Q	(Lithuania)	Zalgiris Vilnius	6–0	1–0	7–0
2001–02	UEFA Cup	R1	(Croatia)	Dinamo Zagreb	1–1	2–2	3–3 (Note: won on away goals)
2001–02	UEFA Cup	R2	(Netherlands)	Roda JC	2–1	1–4	3–5
2002–03	UEFA Cup	Q	(Estonia)	Levadia Tallinn	2–0 (Note: Match played outside of Israel after UEFA banned international matches from being played within Israel.)	2–0	4–0
2002–03	UEFA Cup	R1	(Portugal)	Boavista	1–0	1–4	2–4
2003–04	Champions League	Q2	(Slovakia)	MŠK Žilina	1–1	0–1	1–2
2004–05	Champions League	Q2	(Finland)	HJK Helsinki	1–0	0–0	1–0
2004–05	Champions League	Q3	(Greece)	PAOK	1–0	3–0 (Note: First leg awarded as a 3–0 win for Maccabi after PAOK fielded a suspended player, the original game ended with Maccabi win 2–1.)	4–0
2004–05	Champions League	Group Stage	(Germany)	Bayern Munich	0–1 (Note: Match played in Ramat Gan Stadium)	1–5	4th
2004–05	Champions League	Group Stage	(Italy)	Juventus	1–1	0–1	4th
2004–05	Champions League	Group Stage	(Netherlands)	Ajax	2–1	0–3	4th
2005–06	UEFA Cup	Q2	(Cyprus)	APOEL	2–2 (a.e.t.)	0–1	2–3
2007–08	UEFA Cup	Q1	(Andorra)	Santa Coloma	4–0	0–1	4–1
2007–08	UEFA Cup	Q2	(Turkey)	Kayseri Erciyesspor	1–1	1–3	2–4
2010–11	Europa League	Q2	(Montenegro)	FK Mogren	2–0	1–2	3–2
2010–11	Europa League	Q3	(Greece)	Olympiacos	1–0	1–2	2–2
2010–11	Europa League	PO	(France)	Paris Saint-Germain	4–3	0–2	4–5
2011–12	Europa League	Q2	(Azerbaijan)	FK Khazar Lankaran	3–1	0–0	3–1
2011–12	Europa League	Q3	(Bosnia and Herzegovina)	Željezničar	6–0	2–0	8–0
2011–12	Europa League	PO	(Greece)	Panathinaikos	3–0	1–2	4–2
2011–12	Europa League	Group Stage	(Turkey)	Beşiktaş	2–3	1–5	4th
2011–12	Europa League	Group Stage	(Ukraine)	Dynamo Kyiv	1–1	3–3	4th
2011–12	Europa League	Group Stage	(England)	Stoke City	1–2	0–3	4th
2013–14	Champions League	Q2	(Hungary)	Győri ETO	2–1	2–0	4–1
2013–14	Champions League	Q3	(Switzerland)	Basel	3–3	0–1	3–4
2013–14	Europa League	PO	(Greece)	PAOK	Cancelled (Note: PAOK reinstated in the Champions League after Metalist Kharkiv were removed for match fixing. Thus, Maccabi Tel Aviv received a bye into the group stage.)		
2013–14	Europa League	Group Stage	(France)	Bordeaux	1–0	2–1	2nd
2013–14	Europa League	Group Stage	(Cyprus)	APOEL	0–0	0–0	2nd
2013–14	Europa League	Group Stage	(Germany)	Eintracht Frankfurt	4–2	0–2	2nd
2013–14	Europa League	Round of 32	(Switzerland)	Basel	0–0	0–3	0–3
2014–15	Champions League	Q2	(Andorra)	Santa Coloma	2–0	1–0	3–0
2014–15	Champions League	Q3	(Slovenia)	Maribor	2–2	0–1	2–3
2014–15	Europa League	PO	(Greece)	Asteras Tripolis	3–1	0–2	3–3 (Note: lost on away goals)
2015–16	Champions League	Q2	(Malta)	Hibernians	5–1	1–2	6–3
2015–16	Champions League	Q3	(Czech Republic)	Viktoria Plzeň	1–2	2–0	3–2
2015–16	Champions League	PO	(Switzerland)	Basel	1–1	2–2	3–3
2015–16	Champions League	Group Stage	(England)	Chelsea	0–4 (Note: Match played in Sammy Ofer Stadium)	0–4	4th
2015–16	Champions League	Group Stage	(Ukraine)	Dynamo Kyiv	0–2	0–1	4th
2015–16	Champions League	Group Stage	(Portugal)	Porto	1–3	0–2	4th
2016–17	Europa League	Q1	(Slovenia)	ND Gorica	3–0	1–0	4–0
2016–17	Europa League	Q2	(Kazakhstan)	FC Kairat	2–1	1–1	3–2
2016–17	Europa League	Q3	(Romania)	Pandurii Târgu Jiu	2–1	3–1	5–2
2016–17	Europa League	PO	(Croatia)	Hajduk Split	2–1	1–2 (a.e.t.) (4–3 p)	3–3 (Note: won on penalties)
2016–17	Europa League	Group Stage	(Russia)	Zenit Saint Petersburg	3–4	0–2	3rd
2016–17	Europa League	Group Stage	(Netherlands)	AZ	0–0	2–1	3rd
2016–17	Europa League	Group Stage	(Republic of Ireland)	Dundalk	2–1	0–1	3rd
2017–18	Europa League	Q1	(Albania)	Tirana	2–0	3–0	5–0
2017–18	Europa League	Q2	(Iceland)	KR	3–1	2–0	5–1
2017–18	Europa League	Q3	(Greece)	Panionios	1–0	1–0	2–0
2017–18	Europa League	PO	(Austria)	Altach	2–2	1–0	3–2
2017–18	Europa League	Group Stage	(Spain)	Villarreal	0–0	1–0	4th
2017–18	Europa League	Group Stage	(Kazakhstan)	Astana	0–1	0–4	4th
2017–18	Europa League	Group Stage	(Czech Republic)	Slavia Prague	0–2	0–1	4th
2018–19	Europa League	Q1	(Hungary)	Ferencváros	1–0	1–1	2–1
2018–19	Europa League	Q2	(Serbia)	Radnički Niš	2–0	2–2	4–2
2018–19	Europa League	Q3	(Armenia)	Pyunik	2–1	0–0	2–1
2018–19	Europa League	PO	(Norway)	Sarpsborg	2–1	1–3	3–4
2019–20	Champions League	Q2	(Romania)	CFR Cluj	2–2 (Note: Match played in Netanya Stadium)	0–1	2–3
2019–20	Europa League	Q3	(Lithuania)	Sūduva	1–2	1–2	2–4
2020–21	Champions League	Q1	(Latvia)	Riga FC	2–0	—N/a	2–0
2020–21	Champions League	Q2	(Lithuania)	Sūduva	—N/a	3–0	3–0
2020–21	Champions League	Q3	(Belarus)	Dynamo Brest	1–0	—N/a	1–0
2020–21	Champions League	PO	(Austria)	Red Bull Salzburg	1–2	1–3	2–5
2020–21	Europa League	Group Stage	(Spain)	Villarreal	1–1	0–4	2nd
2020–21	Europa League	Group Stage	(Azerbaijan)	Qarabag	1–0	1–1	2nd
2020–21	Europa League	Group Stage	(Turkey)	Sivasspor	1–0	2–1	2nd
2020–21	Europa League	Round of 32	(Ukraine)	Shakhtar Donetsk	0–2	0–1	0–3
2021–22	Europa Conference League	Q2	(Montenegro)	Sutjeska Nikšić	3–1	0–0	3–1
2021–22	Europa Conference League	Q3	(Slovakia)	Spartak Trnava	1–0	0–0	1–0
2021–22	Europa Conference League	PO	(Kazakhstan)	Shakhter Karagandy	2–0	2–1	4–1
2021–22	Europa Conference League	Group Stage	(Austria)	LASK	0–1	1–1	2nd
2021–22	Europa Conference League	Group Stage	(Armenia)	Alashkert	4–1	1–1	2nd
2021–22	Europa Conference League	Group Stage	(Finland)	HJK	3–0	5–0	2nd
2021–22	Europa Conference League	KOPO	(Netherlands)	PSV Eindhoven	1–1	0–1	1–2
2022–23	Europa Conference League	Q2	(Azerbaijan)	Zira	0–0	3–0	3–0
2022–23	Europa Conference League	Q3	(Greece)	Aris Thessaloniki	2–0	1–2	3–2
2022–23	Europa Conference League	PO	(France)	Nice	1–0	0–2 (a.e.t.)	1–2
2023–24	Europa Conference League	Q2	(Moldova)	Petrocub Hîncești	3–0	2–0	5–0
2023–24	Europa Conference League	Q3	(Cyprus)	AEK Larnaca	1–0	1–1	2–1
2023–24	Europa Conference League	PO	(Slovenia)	Celje	4–1	1–1	5–2
2023–24	Europa Conference League	Group Stage	(Belgium)	Gent	3–1	0–2	1st
2023–24	Europa Conference League	Group Stage	(Ukraine)	Zorya Luhansk	3–2	3–1	1st
2023–24	Europa Conference League	Group Stage	(Iceland)	Breiðablik	3–2	2–1	1st
2023–24	Europa Conference League	Round of 16	(Greece)	Olympiacos	1–6 (a.e.t.)	4–1	5–7
2024–25	Champions League	Q2	(Romania)	FCSB	0−1	1−1	1–2
2024–25	Europa League	Q3	(Lithuania)	Panevėžys	3–0	2–1	5–1
2024–25	Europa League	PO	(Serbia)	FK TSC	3–0	5–1	8–1
2024–25	Europa League	League phase	(Portugal)	Porto	0–1	—	29th
2024–25	Europa League	League phase	(Netherlands)	Ajax	—	0–5	29th
2024–25	Europa League	League phase	(Spain)	Real Sociedad	1–2	—	29th
2024–25	Europa League	League phase	(Portugal)	Braga	—	1–2	29th
2024–25	Europa League	League phase	(Denmark)	Midtjylland	0–2	—	29th
2024–25	Europa League	League phase	(Norway)	Bodø/Glimt	—	1–3	29th
2024–25	Europa League	League phase	(Latvia)	RFS	2–1	—	29th
2024–25	Europa League	League phase	(Turkey)	Beşiktaş	—	3–1	29th
2025–26	Champions League	Q2	(Cyprus)	Pafos	0–1	1–1	1–2
2025–26	Europa League	Q3	(Malta)	Hamrun Spartans	3–1	2–1	5–2
2025–26	Europa League	PO	(Ukraine)	Dynamo Kyiv	3–1	0–1	3–2
2025–26	Europa League	League phase	(Greece)	PAOK	—	0–0	36th
2025–26	Europa League	League phase	(Croatia)	Dinamo Zagreb	1–3	—	36th
2025–26	Europa League	League phase	(Denmark)	Midtjylland	0–3	—	36th
2025–26	Europa League	League phase	(England)	Aston Villa	—	0–2	36th
2025–26	Europa League	League phase	(France)	Lyon	0–6	—	36th
2025–26	Europa League	League phase	(Germany)	VfB Stuttgart	—	1–4	36th
2025–26	Europa League	League phase	(Germany)	SC Freiburg	—	0–1	36th
2025–26	Europa League	League phase	(Italy)	Bologna	0–3	—	36th
2026–27	Europa League	Q2	(Moldova)	Sheriff Tiraspol	1–0	5–0	6–0
2026–27	Europa League	Q3	(Bulgaria)	CSKA Sofia	0–3	3–1	3–4
2026–27	Conference League	PO	(Switzerland)	Lugano	1–1	1–2	2–3
Season	Competition	Round	Country	Opponent	Home	Away	Aggregate

=== By Competitions ===
- Correct as of 25 August 2022

Competition	S	Pld	W	D	L	GF	GA	GD
UEFA Champions League	10	47	15	10	22	50	63	−13
UEFA Europa League	15	96	42	21	33	136	120	+16
UEFA Europa Conference League	3	22	11	6	5	33	16	+17
UEFA Cup Winners' Cup	1	4	2	1	1	6	4	+2
UEFA Intertoto Cup	1	4	0	1	3	2	9	−7
Total	29	171	69	39	61	224	208	+16

==== Before joining UEFA ====
Competition	S	Pld	W	D	L	GF	GA	GD
UEFA Intertoto Cup	3	18	4	2	12	29	40	−11

== List of matches in Asian competitions ==
Season	Competition	Round	Country	Club	Score	Aggregate
1969	1969 Asian Champion Club Tournament	Group Stage	(Japan)	Toyo Kogyo	3–2	1st
1969	1969 Asian Champion Club Tournament	Group Stage	(Iran)	Persepolis	0–0	1st
1969	1969 Asian Champion Club Tournament	Group Stage	(Malaysia)	Perak FA	1–1	1st
1969	1969 Asian Champion Club Tournament	Group Stage	(Hong Kong)	Kowloon Motor Bus	5–0	1st
1969	1969 Asian Champion Club Tournament	Semi-finals	(India)	Mysore State	6–1	
1969	1969 Asian Champion Club Tournament	Final	(South Korea)	Yangzee FC	1–0	
1971	1971 Asian Champion Club Tournament	Preliminary round	(Malaysia)	Perak FA	1–0	
1971	1971 Asian Champion Club Tournament	Group Stage	(Iraq)	Aliyat Al-Shorta	3–0 (Note: The match was awarded to Maccabi Tel Aviv as Aliyat Al-Shorta refused to play for political reasons.)	1st
1971	1971 Asian Champion Club Tournament	Group Stage	(Thailand)	Bangkok Bank FC	4–1	1st
1971	1971 Asian Champion Club Tournament	Group Stage	(India)	FC Punjab Police	4–1	1st
1971	1971 Asian Champion Club Tournament	Semi-finals	(South Korea)	ROK Army	2–0	
1971	1971 Asian Champion Club Tournament	Final	(Iraq)	Aliyat Al-Shorta	w/o	

== UEFA Team Ranking ==
- Bold row separators indicate change of ranking system.
- Italic font indicate ongoing season.

Season	Rank	T.Points	S.Points	Ref.
2025–26	65 ▼	32.500	3.000	
2024–25	60 ▼	37.500	4.000	
2023–24	54 ▲	35.500	14.000	
2022–23	71 ▼	24.000	2.500	
2021–22	66 ▲	24.500	9.000	
2020–21	71 ▲	20.500	8.000	
2019–20	92 ▼	16.500	2.000	
2018–19	89 ▼	16.000	2.500	
2017–18	63 ▲	22.500	3.000	
2016–17	88 ▲	23.375	6.350	
2015–16	98 ▲	20.225	4.450	
2014–15	104 ▲	18.200	1.775	
2013–14	107 ▲	17.875	10.150	
2012–13	176 ▼	8.075	0.650	
2011–12	174 ▲	7.900	3.200	
2010–11	190 ▲	5.900	2.125	
2009–10	214 ▼	3.775	1.450	
2008–09	155 ▲	9.050	0.350	
2007–08	160 ▼	11.197	0.7835	
2006–07	143 ▼	14.338	1.9800	
2005–06	123 ▼	19.108	0.4950	
2004–05	116 ▲	19.218	7.1960	
2003–04	145 ▼	14.012	0.7425	
2002–03	135 ▲	18.999	4.9165	
2001–02	156 ▲	15.666	8.1665	
2000–01	206 ▼	9.062	0.9165	
1999–2000	203 ▲	8.770	2.5000	
1998–99	205 ▼	7.770	2.5000	
1997–98	158 ▼	1.000	1.000	
1996–97	147 ▲	0.500	1.000	
1995–96	199 ▼		0.500	
1994–95	179 ▲	0.500	0.500	

== Record by country of opposition ==
- Correct as of 5 August 2023.

Country	Pld	W	D	L	GF	GA	Diff
Albania	2	2	0	0	5	0	+5
Andorra	4	3	0	1	7	1	+6
Armenia	4	3	1	0	7	3	+4
Austria	6	1	2	3	6	9	-3
Azerbaijan	6	3	3	0	8	2	+6
Belarus	1	1	0	0	1	0	+1
Belgium	3	0	0	3	0	6	-6
Bosnia and Herzegovina	2	2	0	0	8	0	+8
Croatia	4	1	2	1	6	6	0
Cyprus	4	0	3	1	2	3	-1
Czech Republic	5	1	0	4	4	8	-4
England	4	0	0	4	1	13	-12
Estonia	2	2	0	0	4	0	+4
Finland	4	3	1	0	9	0	+9
France	8	4	1	3	11	12	-1
Germany	7	1	2	4	5	12	-7
Greece	14	9	0	5	23	16	+7
Hungary	4	3	1	0	6	2	+4
Iceland	5	5	0	0	14	5	+9
Ireland	2	1	0	1	2	2	0
Italy	2	0	1	1	1	2	-1
Kazakhstan	6	3	1	2	7	7	-8
Latvia	1	1	0	0	2	0	+1
Lithuania	7	4	0	3	16	7	+9
Malta	4	3	0	1	9	4	+5
Montenegro	4	2	1	1	6	3	+3
Netherlands	8	3	2	3	8	12	-4
Norway	2	1	0	1	3	4	-1
Portugal	4	1	0	3	3	9	-6
Romania	4	2	1	1	7	5	+2
Russia	2	0	0	2	3	6	-3
Serbia	2	1	1	0	4	2	+2
Slovakia	4	1	2	1	2	2	0
Slovenia	4	2	1	1	6	3	+3
Spain	6	1	3	2	5	9	-4
Switzerland	8	0	5	3	7	12	-5
Sweden	1	0	0	1	0	4	-4
Turkey	8	2	2	4	9	15	-6
Ukraine	6	0	2	4	4	10	-6

== Achievements in Europe ==
Season	Achievement	Notes
UEFA Champions League
2004–05	Group stage	Eliminated by Juventus, Bayern Munich, Ajax
2015–16	Group stage	Eliminated by Chelsea, Dynamo Kyiv, Porto
UEFA Europa League
2011–12	Group stage	Eliminated by Beşiktaş, Dynamo Kyiv, Stoke City
2013–14	Round of 32	Eliminated by Basel
2016–17	Group stage	Eliminated by Zenit Saint Petersburg, Dundalk, AZ
2017–18	Group stage	Eliminated by Villarreal, Slavia Prague, Astana
2020–21	Round of 32	Eliminated by Shakhtar Donetsk
2024–25	League phase	
UEFA Europa Conference League
2021–22	Knockout round play-offs	Eliminated by PSV Eindhoven
2023–24	Round of 16	Eliminated by Olympiacos

== Maccabi Tel Aviv in European group stages and League phases ==
=== Champions League ===
==== 2004–05 Group C ====
Pos	Team	Pld	W	D	L	GF	GA	GD	Pts	Qualification	JUV	BAY	AJX	MTA
1	(Italy) Juventus	6	5	1	0	6	1	+5	16	Advance to knockout stage	—	1–0	1–0	1–0
2	(Germany) Bayern Munich	6	3	1	2	12	5	+7	10	Advance to knockout stage	0–1	—	4–0	5–1
3	(Netherlands) Ajax	6	1	1	4	6	10	−4	4	Transfer to UEFA Cup	0–1	2–2	—	3–0
4	(Israel) Maccabi Tel Aviv	6	1	1	4	4	12	−8	4		1–1	0–1	2–1	—

Legend: Blue = home team win; Yellow = draw; Red = away team win.

==== 2015–16 Group G ====
Pos	Team	Pld	W	D	L	GF	GA	GD	Pts	Qualification	CHE	DKV	POR	MTA
1	(England) Chelsea	6	4	1	1	13	3	+10	13	Advance to knockout phase	—	2–1	2–0	4–0
2	(Ukraine) Dynamo Kyiv	6	3	2	1	8	4	+4	11	Advance to knockout phase	0–0	—	2–2	1–0
3	(Portugal) Porto	6	3	1	2	9	8	+1	10	Transfer to Europa League	2–1	0–2	—	2–0
4	(Israel) Maccabi Tel Aviv	6	0	0	6	1	16	−15	0		0–4	0–2	1–3	—

Source: UEFA
Legend: Blue = home team win; Yellow = draw; Red = away team win.
Rules for classification: Group stage tiebreakers

=== Europa League ===
==== 2011–12 Group E ====
Pos	Team	Pld	W	D	L	GF	GA	GD	Pts	Qualification	BEŞ	SC	DK	MTA
1	(Turkey) Beşiktaş	6	4	0	2	13	7	+6	12	Advance to knockout phase	—	3–1	1–0	5–1
2	(England) Stoke City	6	3	2	1	10	7	+3	11	Advance to knockout phase	2–1	—	1–1	3–0
3	(Ukraine) Dynamo Kyiv	6	1	4	1	7	7	0	7		1–0	1–1	—	3–3
4	(Israel) Maccabi Tel Aviv	6	0	2	4	8	17	−9	2		2–3	1–2	1–1	—

Source: Soccerway
Legend: Blue = home team win; Yellow = draw; Red = away team win.

==== 2013–14 Group F ====
Pos	Team	Pld	W	D	L	GF	GA	GD	Pts	Qualification	EIN	MTA	APO	BOR
1	(Germany) Eintracht Frankfurt	6	5	0	1	13	4	+9	15	Advance to knockout phase	—	2–0	2–0	3–0
2	(Israel) Maccabi Tel Aviv	6	3	2	1	7	5	+2	11	Advance to knockout phase	4–2	—	0–0	1–0
3	(Cyprus) APOEL	6	1	2	3	3	8	−5	5		0–3	0–0	—	2–1
4	(France) Bordeaux	6	1	0	5	4	10	−6	3		0–1	1–2	2–1	—

Source: Soccerway
Legend: Blue = home team win; Yellow = draw; Red = away team win.

==== 2016–17 Group D ====
Pos	Team	Pld	W	D	L	GF	GA	GD	Pts	Qualification	ZEN	AZ	MTA	DUN
1	(Russia) Zenit Saint Petersburg	6	5	0	1	17	8	+9	15	Advance to knockout phase	—	5–0	2–0	2–1
2	(Netherlands) AZ	6	2	2	2	6	10	−4	8	Advance to knockout phase	3–2	—	1–2	1–1
3	(Israel) Maccabi Tel Aviv	6	2	1	3	7	9	−2	7		3–4	0–0	—	2–1
4	(Republic of Ireland) Dundalk	6	1	1	4	5	8	−3	4		1–2	0–1	1–0	—

Source: UEFA
Legend: Blue = home team win; Yellow = draw; Red = away team win.

==== 2017–18 Group A ====
Pos	Team	Pld	W	D	L	GF	GA	GD	Pts	Qualification	VIL	AST	SLP	MTA
1	(Spain) Villarreal	6	3	2	1	10	6	+4	11	Advance to knockout phase	—	3–1	2–2	0–1
2	(Kazakhstan) Astana	6	3	1	2	10	7	+3	10	Advance to knockout phase	2–3	—	1–1	4–0
3	(Czech Republic) Slavia Prague	6	2	2	2	6	6	0	8		0–2	0–1	—	1–0
4	(Israel) Maccabi Tel Aviv	6	1	1	4	1	8	−7	4		0–0	0–1	0–2	—

Source: UEFA
Legend: Blue = home team win; Yellow = draw; Red = away team win.
Rules for classification: Group stage tiebreakers

==== 2020–21 Group I ====
Pos	Team	Pld	W	D	L	GF	GA	GD	Pts	Qualification	VIL	MTA	SIV	QRB
1	(Spain) Villarreal	6	5	1	0	17	5	+12	16	Advance to knockout phase	—	4–0	5–3	3–0 (Note: The Villarreal v Qarabağ match was awarded as a 3–0 win to Villarreal after being cancelled as several players of the Qarabağ squad tested positive for the SARS-CoV-2.)
2	(Israel) Maccabi Tel Aviv	6	3	2	1	6	7	−1	11	Advance to knockout phase	1–1	—	1–0	1–0
3	(Turkey) Sivasspor	6	2	0	4	9	11	−2	6		0–1	1–2	—	2–0
4	(Azerbaijan) Qarabağ	6	0	1	5	4	13	−9	1		1–3	1–1	2–3	—

Source: UEFA
Legend: Blue = home team win; Yellow = draw; Red = away team win.
Rules for classification: Group stage tiebreakers

==== 2024–25 League phase ====
Pos	Team	Pld	W	D	L	GF	GA	GD	Pts
27	(German Football Association) TSG Hoffenheim	8	2	3	3	11	14	−3	9
28	(Turkish Football Federation) Beşiktaş	8	3	0	5	10	15	−5	9
29	(Israel Football Association) Maccabi Tel Aviv	8	2	0	6	8	17	−9	6
30	(Football Association of the Czech Republic) Slavia Prague	8	1	2	5	7	11	−4	5
31	(Swedish Football Association) Malmö FF	8	1	2	5	10	17	−7	5

Source: UEFA
Rules for classification: League phase tiebreakers

==== 2025–26 League phase ====
Pos	Team	Pld	W	D	L	GF	GA	GD	Pts
32	(Scottish Football Association) Rangers	8	1	1	6	5	14	−9	4
33	(French Football Federation) Nice	8	1	0	7	7	15	−8	3
34	(Royal Dutch Football Association) Utrecht	8	0	1	7	5	15	−10	1
35	(Swedish Football Association) Malmö FF	8	0	1	7	4	15	−11	1
36	(Israel Football Association) Maccabi Tel Aviv	8	0	1	7	2	22	−20	1

Source: UEFA
Rules for classification: League phase tiebreakers

=== Europa Conference League ===
==== 2021–22 Group A ====
Pos	Team	Pld	W	D	L	GF	GA	GD	Pts	Qualification	LASK	MTA	HJK	ALA
1	(Austria) LASK	6	5	1	0	12	1	+11	16	Advance to round of 16	—	1–1	3–0	2–0
2	(Israel) Maccabi Tel Aviv	6	3	2	1	14	4	+10	11	Advance to knockout round play-offs	0–1	—	3–0	4–1
3	(Finland) HJK	6	2	0	4	5	15	−10	6		0–2	0–5	—	1–0
4	(Armenia) Alashkert	6	0	1	5	4	15	−11	1		0–3	1–1	2–4	—

Source: UEFA
Legend: Blue = home team win; Yellow = draw; Red = away team win.
Rules for classification: Group stage tiebreakers

==== 2023–24 Group B ====
Pos	Team	Pld	W	D	L	GF	GA	GD	Pts	Qualification	MTA	GNT	ZOR	BRE
1	(Israel) Maccabi Tel Aviv	6	5	0	1	14	9	+5	15	Advance to round of 16	—	3–1	3–2	3–2
2	(Belgium) Gent	6	4	1	1	16	7	+9	13	Advance to knockout round play-offs	2–0	—	4–1	5–0
3	(Ukraine) Zorya Luhansk	6	2	1	3	10	11	−1	7		1–3	1–1	—	4–0
4	(Iceland) Breiðablik	6	0	0	6	5	18	−13	0		1–2	2–3	0–1	—

Source: UEFA
Legend: Blue = home team win; Yellow = draw; Red = away team win.
Rules for classification: Group stage tiebreakers

== Maccabi Tel Aviv in European knockout phases ==
=== Europa League ===
==== 2013–14 – Round of 32 ====
20 February 2014 Round of 32 – 1st leg	Maccabi Tel Aviv (Israel)	0–0	(Switzerland) Basel	Tel Aviv, Israel
21:05		Report		Stadium: Bloomfield Stadium; Attendance: 13,519; Referee: David Fernández Borbalán (Spain)

27 February 2014 Round of 32 – 2nd leg	Basel (Switzerland)	3–0	(Israel) Maccabi Tel Aviv	Basel, Switzerland
19:00	Stocker 17'; Streller 60', 71'	Report		Stadium: St. Jakob-Park; Attendance: 15,212; Referee: Ivan Bebek (Croatia)

Basel won 3–0 on aggregate. Basel won 3–0 on aggregate.

==== 2020–21 – Round of 32 ====
18 February 2021 Round of 32 – 1st leg	Maccabi Tel Aviv (Israel)	0–2	(Ukraine) Shakhtar Donetsk	Tel Aviv, Israel
22:00 EET (UTC+2)	Glazer (yellow card) 64'; Peretz (yellow card) 83'	Report	31' Patrick; (yellow card) 41' Marlos; (yellow card) 75' Taison; 90+3' Tetê	Stadium: Bloomfield Stadium; Attendance: 0 Referee: François Letexier (France)

25 February 2021 Round of 32 – 2nd leg	Shakhtar Donetsk (Ukraine)	1–0 (3–0 agg.)	(Israel) Maccabi Tel Aviv	Kyiv, Ukraine
19:55 EET (UTC+2)	Vitão (yellow card) 33'; Moraes 67' (pen.)	Report		Stadium: NSC Olimpiyskiy; Referee: José María Sánchez Martínez (Spain)

=== Europa Conference League ===
==== 2021–22 – Knockout round play-offs ====
17 February 2022 Knockout round play-offs — 1st leg	PSV Eindhoven (Netherlands)	1–0	(Israel) Maccabi Tel Aviv	Eindhoven, Netherlands
18:45	Gakpo 11'	Report		Stadium: Philips Stadion; Attendance: 14,280; Referee: Glenn Nyberg (Sweden)

24 February 2022 Knockout round play-offs — 2nd leg	Maccabi Tel Aviv (Israel)	1–1 (1–2 agg.)	(Netherlands) PSV Eindhoven	Tel Aviv, Israel
18:45 (19:45 IDT)	Saborit 90+1'	Report	85' Vertessen	Stadium: Bloomfield Stadium

==== 2023–24 – Round of 16 ====
7 March 2024 Round of 16 — 1st leg	Olympiacos (Greece)	1–4	(Israel) Maccabi Tel Aviv	Piraeus, Greece
20:45	El Kaabi 13'	Report	Zahavi 4', 30'; Shahar 9'; Peretz 74'	Stadium: Karaiskakis Stadium; Attendance: 31,054; Referee: Craig Pawson (England)

14 March 2024 Round of 16 — 2nd leg	Maccabi Tel Aviv (Israel)	1–6 (a.e.t.) (5–7 agg.)	(Greece) Olympiacos	Bačka Topola, Serbia (Note: Due to the Gaza war, Maccabi Tel Aviv play their remaining home matches at a neutral venue.)
21:00	Zahavi 57' (pen.)	Report	Podence 10'; Fortounis 36'; El Kaabi 45+3', 65'; Jovetić 93'; El-Arabi 103'	Stadium: TSC Arena; Attendance: 370; Referee: Maurizio Mariani (Italy)
