= 2001–02 UEFA Cup qualifying round =

The 2001–02 UEFA Cup qualifying round was played from 9 to 23 August 2001. The round consisted of 41 ties, with the winners advancing to join 55 other teams in the first round of the 2001–02 UEFA Cup.

== Draw ==
The draw was held on 22 June 2001, 12:30 CEST, at the Noga Hilton Hotel in Geneva, Switzerland. Teams were divided into geographical groups, each with seeded and unseeded pots.

As Hungary's 2000–01 Nemzeti Bajnokság I was not completed at the time of the draw, the second-placed team from Hungary (later confirmed to be Dunaferr) was represented by a placeholder and treated as unseeded.

== Summary ==
The first legs were played on 9 August, and the second legs were played on 23 August 2001.

Team 1	Agg.	Team 2	1st leg	2nd leg
Cosmos (San Marino)	0–3	(Austria) Rapid Wien	0–1	0–2
Pelister (North Macedonia)	3–4	(Switzerland) St. Gallen	0–2	3–2
Dinamo București (Romania)	4–1	(Albania) Dinamo Tirana	1–0	3–1
Olimpija Ljubljana (Slovenia)	7–0	(Azerbaijan) Shafa Baku	4–0	3–0
Midtjylland (Denmark)	5–1	(Northern Ireland) Glentoran	1–1	4–0
Narva Trans (Estonia)	3–5	(Sweden) IF Elfsborg	3–0 (Note: Narva Trans awarded 3–0 as Elfsborg fielded an ineligible player, Christian Lundström. The score at the moment was 1–3.)	0–5
Club Brugge (Belgium)	10–1	(Iceland) ÍA	4–0	6–1
Obilić (Federal Republic of Yugoslavia)	5–1	(Faroe Islands) GÍ	4–0	1–1
Brașov (Romania)	7–1	(Armenia) Mika	5–1	2–0
Viking (Norway)	2–1	(Bosnia and Herzegovina) Brotnjo	1–0	1–1
CSKA Kyiv (Ukraine)	4–0	(Finland) Jokerit	2–0	2–0
Vardar (North Macedonia)	1–6	(Belgium) Standard Liège	0–3	1–3
HJK (Finland)	3–1	(Latvia) Ventspils	2–1	1–0
Cwmbrân Town (Wales)	0–5	(Slovakia) Slovan Bratislava	0–4	0–1
Marítimo (Portugal)	2–0	(Bosnia and Herzegovina) Sarajevo	1–0	1–0
Fylkir (Iceland)	3–2	(Poland) Pogoń Szczecin	2–1	1–1
Dinamo Zagreb (Croatia)	2–0	(Estonia) Flora	1–0	1–0
Glenavon (Northern Ireland)	0–2	(Scotland) Kilmarnock	0–1	0–1
Tirana (Albania)	4–5	(Cyprus) Apollon Limassol	3–2	1–3
Ararat Yerevan (Armenia)	0–5	(Israel) Hapoel Tel Aviv	0–2	0–3
Etzella Ettelbruck (Luxembourg)	1–6	(Poland) Legia Warsaw	0–4	1–2
Zimbru Chișinău (Moldova)	1–4	(Turkey) Gaziantepspor	0–0	1–4
Dinaburg (Latvia)	2–2 (a)	(Croatia) Osijek	2–1	0–1
Neftçi (Azerbaijan)	0–1	(Slovenia) HIT Gorica	0–0	0–1
HB (Faroe Islands)	2–6	(Austria) GAK	2–2	0–4
Atlantas (Lithuania)	0–12	(Romania) Rapid București	0–4	0–8
Matador Púchov (Slovakia)	4–2	(Malta) Sliema Wanderers	3–0	1–2
Longford Town (Republic of Ireland)	1–3	(Bulgaria) Litex Lovech	1–1	0–2
Brøndby (Denmark)	5–0	(Republic of Ireland) Shelbourne	2–0	3–0
FC Santa Coloma (Andorra)	1–8	(Federal Republic of Yugoslavia) Partizan	0–1	1–7
Maccabi Tel Aviv (Israel)	7–0	(Lithuania) Žalgiris	6–0	1–0
Shakhtyor Soligorsk (Belarus)	2–5	(Bulgaria) CSKA Sofia	1–2	1–3
MYPA (Finland)	2–5	(Sweden) Helsingborgs IF	1–3	1–2
Dinamo Tbilisi (Georgia (country))	2–5	(Belarus) BATE Borisov	2–1	0–4
Debrecen (Hungary)	3–1	(Moldova) Nistru Otaci	3–0	0–1
Polonia Warsaw (Poland)	6–0	(Wales) Total Network Solutions	4–0	2–0
Birkirkara (Malta)	1–1 (a)	(Georgia (country)) Locomotive Tbilisi	0–0	1–1
AEK Athens (Greece)	8–0	(Luxembourg) Grevenmacher	6–0	2–0
Ružomberok (Slovakia)	3–1	(Belarus) Belshina Bobruisk	3–1	0–0
Olympiakos Nicosia (Cyprus)	6–4	(Hungary) Dunaferr	2–2	4–2
Vaduz (Liechtenstein)	4–9	(Croatia) Varteks	3–3	1–6

== Matches ==
9 August 2001
20:30

Cosmos (San Marino)	0–1	(Austria) Rapid Wien
	Report	Wallner 10'

Stadio Olimpico, Serravalle
Attendance: 1,132
Referee: Kostadin Kostadinov (Bulgaria)
23 August 2001
17:00

Rapid Wien (Austria)	2–0	(San Marino) Cosmos
Lagonikakis 29', 89'	Report

Gerhard Hanappi Stadium, Vienna
Attendance: 3,300
Referee: Anastasios Papaioannou (Cyprus)

Rapid Wien won 3–0 on aggregate.

9 August 2001
17:30

Pelister (North Macedonia)	0–2	(Switzerland) St. Gallen
	Report	Guido 4'; Dal Santo 89'

Stadion Tumbe Kafe, Bitola
Attendance: 1,664
Referee: Johan Verbist (Belgium)
23 August 2001
20:00

St. Gallen (Switzerland)	2–3	(North Macedonia) Pelister
Gane 57', 61'	Report	Talevski 65'; Deliovski 72'; Elmazovski 74'

Letzigrund, Zürich
Attendance: 3,555
Referee: Tonny Poulsen (Denmark)

St. Gallen won 4–3 on aggregate.

9 August 2001
17:00

Dinamo București (Romania)	1–0	(Albania) Dinamo Tirana
Niculescu 34' (pen.)	Report

Stadionul Dinamo, Bucharest
Attendance: 8,000
Referee: Nikolaos Agelakis (Greece)
23 August 2001
20:15

Dinamo Tirana (Albania)	1–3	(Romania) Dinamo București
Dhembi 89'	Report	Niculescu 18'; Mihalcea 45'; Drăgan 77'

Qemal Stafa Stadium, Tirana
Attendance: 3,000
Referee: Zsolt Szabó (Hungary)

Dinamo București won 4–1 on aggregate.

9 August 2001
20:15

Olimpija Ljubljana (Slovenia)	4–0	(Azerbaijan) Shafa Baku
Komac 28'; Tiganj 58', 59'; Calleja 74'	Report

Bežigrad Stadium, Ljubliana
Attendance: 500
Referee: Anthony Zammit (Malta)
23 August 2001
16:00

Shafa Baku (Azerbaijan)	0–3	(Slovenia) Olimpija Ljubljana
	Report	Kosič 29'; Komar 63'; Jolič 82'

Shafa Stadium, Baku
Attendance: 3,000
Referee: Spiridon Papadakos (Greece)

Olimpija Ljubljana won 7–0 on aggregate.

9 August 2001
18:30

Midtjylland (Denmark)	1–1	(Northern Ireland) Glentoran
Pimpong 16'	Report	Glendinning 84'

SAS Arena, Herning
Attendance: 1,550
Referee: Marian Dorobanţu (Romania)
23 August 2001
20:30

Glentoran (Northern Ireland)	0–4	(Denmark) Midtjylland
	Report	Skoubo 13', 82'; From 65'; Pimpong 85'

The Oval, Belfast
Attendance: 3,044
Referee: Imankhan Sultani (Azerbaijan)

Midtjylland won 5–1 on aggregate.

9 August 2001
17:00

Narva Trans (Estonia)	3–0 Awarded (Note: Narva Trans awarded 3–0 as Elfsborg fielded an ineligible player, Christian Lundström. The score at the moment was 1–3.)	(Sweden) IF Elfsborg
Gruznov 40'	Report	Lundström 33'; Andreasson 36' (pen.), 61'

Narva Kreenholmi Stadium, Narva
Attendance: 350
Referee: Ladislav Gádoši (Slovakia)
23 August 2001
19:00

IF Elfsborg (Sweden)	5–0	(Estonia) Narva Trans
Andreasson 27', 46', 54', 80'; Klarström 47'	Report

Ryavallen, Borås
Attendance: 3,811
Referee: Ceri Richards (Wales)

IF Elfsborg won 5–3 on aggregate.

9 August 2001
20:15

Club Brugge (Belgium)	4–0	(Iceland) ÍA
Lange 62', 85'; Lembi 77'; Mendoza 88' (pen.)	Report

Jan Breydel Stadium, Bruges
Attendance: 2,925
Referee: Karen Nalbandyan (Armenia)
23 August 2001
20:30

ÍA (Iceland)	1–6	(Belgium) Club Brugge
Karvelsson 4'	Report	Nzelo-Lembi 26'; Englebert 65'; Van Der Heyden 74'; Verheyen 77'; Mendoza 84'; Martens 90'

Laugardalsvöllur, Reykjavík
Attendance: 552
Referee: Grzegorz Gilewski (Poland)

Club Brugge won 10–1 on aggregate.

9 August 2001
17:30

Obilić (Federal Republic of Yugoslavia)	4–0	(Faroe Islands) GÍ
Simonović 22'; Zorić 45+2'; Mladenović 48'; Filipović 65'	Report

FK Obilić Stadium, Belgrade
Attendance: 850
Referee: Ruud Bossen (Netherlands)
23 August 2001
19:00

GÍ (Faroe Islands)	1–1	(Federal Republic of Yugoslavia) Obilić
Jarnskor 32' (pen.)	Report	Simonović 20'

Tórsvøllur, Tórshavn
Attendance: 440
Referee: John Feighery (Republic of Ireland)

Obilić won 5–1 on aggregate.

9 August 2001
17:00

Brașov (Romania)	5–1	(Armenia) Mika
Buga 21'; Șandor 23', 27'; Isăilă 47'; Badea 61'	Report	Nazaryan 57'

Stadionul Silviu Ploeșteanu, Brașov
Attendance: 6,200
Referee: Jan Hald (Denmark)
23 August 2001
17:00

Mika (Armenia)	0–2	(Romania) Brașov
	Report	Șandor 38'; Buga 89'

Mika Stadium, Yerevan
Attendance: 500
Referee: Kjell Alseth (Norway)

Brașov won 7–1 on aggregate.

9 August 2001
19:00

Viking (Norway)	1–0	(Bosnia and Herzegovina) Brotnjo
Fuglestad 82' (pen.)	Report

Viking Stadion, Stavanger
Attendance: 2,900
Referee: John R. Underhill (Scotland)
23 August 2001
16:30

Brotnjo (Bosnia and Herzegovina)	1–1	(Norway) Viking
Krivić 32'	Report	Tihinen 28'

Stadion Bare, Čitluk
Attendance: 4,500
Referee: Rene Rogala (Switzerland)

Viking won 2–1 on aggregate.

9 August 2001
17:00

CSKA Kyiv (Ukraine)	2–0	(Finland) Jokerit
Kostyshyn 23'; Maltsev 49'	Report

Dynamo Stadium, Kyiv (Note: CSKA Kyiv played their home matches at Dynamo Stadium, Kyiv, instead of their regular stadium, CSK ZSU Stadium, Kyiv, as it did not meet UEFA requirements.)
Attendance: 2,000
Referee: Ali Aydın (Turkey)
23 August 2001
19:00

Jokerit (Finland)	0–2	(Ukraine) CSKA Kyiv
	Report	Zakarlyuka 57'; Kosyrin 82'

Finnair Stadium, Helsinki
Attendance: 1,237
Referee: Dejan Stanišić (FR Yugoslavia)

CSKA Kyiv won 4–0 on aggregate.

9 August 2001
20:00

Vardar (North Macedonia)	0–3	(Belgium) Standard Liège
	Report	Meyssen 30'; Blay 50'; Walem 69'

Gradski stadion, Skopje
Attendance: 1,560
Referee: Jozef Kačenga (Slovakia)
23 August 2001
20:00

Standard Liège (Belgium)	3–1	(North Macedonia) Vardar
Walem 51'; Lukunku 62', 73'	Report	Abazi 56'

Stade de Sclessin, Liège
Attendance: 8,000
Referee: Darius Miezelis (Lithuania)

Standard Liège won 6–4 on aggregate.

9 August 2001
18:00

HJK (Finland)	2–1	(Latvia) Ventspils
Kallio 37'; Jensen 75'	Report	Rimkus 62' (pen.)

Helsinki Olympic Stadium, Helsinki
Attendance: 2,751
Referee: Aleh Chykun (Belarus)
23 August 2001
16:00

Ventspils (Latvia)	0–1	(Finland) HJK
	Report	Roiha 8'

Ventspils Olimpiskais Stadions, Ventspils
Attendance: 2,200
Referee: Jaroslav Jára (Czech Republic)

HJK won 3–1 on aggregate.

9 August 2001
20:00

Cwmbrân Town (Wales)	0–4	(Slovakia) Slovan Bratislava
	Report	Mojić 40'; Obžera 45'; Vittek 83'; Soboňa 87'

Cardiff Athletics Stadium, Cardiff
Attendance: 496
Referee: Vitaliy Hodulian (Ukraine)
23 August 2001
18:00

Slovan Bratislava (Slovakia)	1–0	(Wales) Cwmbrân Town
Meszároš 78'	Report

Tehelné pole, Bratislava
Attendance: 2,430
Referee: Paulius Malžinskas (Lithuania)

Slovan Bratislava won 5–0 on aggregate.

9 August 2001
22:00

Marítimo (Portugal)	1–0	(Bosnia and Herzegovina) Sarajevo
Dinda 5'	Report

Estádio dos Barreiros, Funchal
Attendance: 3,378
Referee: Stéphane Moulin (France)
23 August 2001
20:30

Sarajevo (Bosnia and Herzegovina)	0–1	(Portugal) Marítimo
	Report	Fernandes 90'

Stadion Koševo, Sarajevo
Attendance: 9,140
Referee: Stefan Meßner (Austria)

Marítimo won 2–0 on aggregate.

9 August 2001
21:00

Fylkir (Iceland)	2–1	(Poland) Pogoń Szczecin
McFarlane 8'; Stígsson 41'	Report	Dźwigała 71' (pen.)

Laugardalsvöllur, Reykjavík
Attendance: 1,319
Referee: Michael Thomas Ross (Northern Ireland)
23 August 2001
17:00

Pogoń Szczecin (Poland)	1–1	(Iceland) Fylkir
Dźwigała 7'	Report	Jónsson 90'

Stadion Florian Krygier, Szczecin
Attendance: 4,791
Referee: Srečko Kandare (Slovenia)

Fylkir won 3–2 on aggregate.

9 August 2001
20:15

Dinamo Zagreb (Croatia)	1–0	(Estonia) Flora
Gondžić 53'	Report

Stadion Maksimir, Zagreb
Attendance: 5,480
Referee: Alan Freeland (Scotland)
23 August 2001
19:15

Flora (Estonia)	0–1	(Croatia) Dinamo Zagreb
	Report	Pilipović 43'

A. Le Coq Arena, Tallinn
Attendance: 1,500
Referee: Miroslaw Ryszka (Poland)

Dinamo Zagreb won 2–0 on aggregate.

9 August 2001
19:45

Glenavon (Northern Ireland)	0–1	(Scotland) Kilmarnock
	Report	Innes 90+3'

Mourneview Park, Lurgan
Attendance: 3,200
Referee: Jari Maisonlahti (Finland)
23 August 2001
20:45

Kilmarnock (Scotland)	1–0	(Northern Ireland) Glenavon
Mitchell 67'	Report

Rugby Park, Kilmarnock
Attendance: 7,454
Referee: Draženko Kovačić (Croatia)

Kilmarnock won 2–0 on aggregate.

9 August 2001
18:00

Tirana (Albania)	3–2	(Cyprus) Apollon Limassol
Fortuzi 58', 83'; Kenesei 75'	Report	Zubarev 3', 48'

Qemal Stafa Stadium, Tirana
Attendance: 3,000
Referee: Joseph Attard (Malta)
23 August 2001
19:00

Apollon Limassol (Cyprus)	3–1	(Albania) Tirana
Miserdovski 57'; Kavazis 62'; Špoljarić 80'	Report	Fortuzi 26'

GSP Stadium, Nicosia
Attendance: 4,200
Referee: Alojzije Šupraha (Croatia)

Apollon Limassol won 5–4 on aggregate.

9 August 2001
17:00

Ararat Yerevan (Armenia)	0–2	(Israel) Hapoel Tel Aviv
	Report	Tuama 38'; Osterc 43'

Vazgen Sargsyan Republican Stadium, Yerevan
Attendance: 4,500
Referee: Jaromír Hlaváč (Czech Republic)
23 August 2001
19:00

Hapoel Tel Aviv (Israel)	3–0	(Armenia) Ararat Yerevan
Osterc 7'; Domb 17'; Udi 88'	Report

Bloomfield Stadium, Tel Aviv
Attendance: 4,000
Referee: Sergei Shebek (Ukraine)

Hapoel Tel Aviv won 5–0 on aggregate.

9 August 2001
19:00

Etzella Ettelbruck (Luxembourg)	0–4	(Poland) Legia Warsaw
	Report	Magiera 12'; Kucharski 15'; Wroblewski 26'; Mierzejewski 72'

Stade Am Deich, Ettelbruck
Attendance: 1,004
Referee: Lassin Isaksen (Faroe Islands)
23 August 2001
20:00

Legia Warsaw (Poland)	2–1	(Luxembourg) Etzella Ettelbruck
Mierzejewski 44'; Karwan 72'	Report	Leweck 50'

Stadion Wojska Polskiego, Warsaw
Attendance: 3,110
Referee: Viorel Anghelinei (Romania)

Legia Warsaw won 6–1 on aggregate.

9 August 2001
19:30

Zimbru Chișinău (Moldova)	0–0	(Turkey) Gaziantepspor
	Report

Stadionul Republican, Chișinău
Attendance: 4,000
Referee: José Joâo Mendes Pratas (Portugal)
23 August 2001
19:30

Gaziantepspor (Turkey)	4–1	(Moldova) Zimbru Chișinău
Tekke 2'; Romashchenko 31'; Özer 65'; Şahintürk 82'	Report	Cebotari 45'

Kamil Ocak Stadium, Gaziantep
Attendance: 5,200
Referee: Attila Juhos (Hungary)

Gaziantepspor won 4–1 on aggregate.

9 August 2001
17:00

Dinaburg (Latvia)	2–1	(Croatia) Osijek
Dorosh 60'; Pučinskis 80'	Report	Vuka 53'

Daugava Stadium, Daugavpils
Attendance: 2,000
Referee: Gylfi Orrason (Iceland)
23 August 2001
20:15

Osijek (Croatia)	1–0	(Latvia) Dinaburg
Balatinac 44' (pen.)	Report

Stadion Gradski vrt, Osijek
Attendance: 4,000
Referee: Asim Khudiev (Azerbaijan)

2–2 on aggregate; Osijek won on away goals.

9 August 2001
16:00

Neftçi (Azerbaijan)	0–0	(Slovenia) HIT Gorica
	Report

Tofiq Bahramov Stadium, Baku
Attendance: 8,000
Referee: Zoltan Szarka (Hungary)
23 August 2001
17:00

HIT Gorica (Slovenia)	1–0	(Azerbaijan) Neftçi
Težački 79'	Report

Sports Park, Nova Gorica
Attendance: 679
Referee: Hermann Albrecht (Germany)

HIT Gorica won 1–0 on aggregate.

9 August 2001
19:30

HB (Faroe Islands)	2–2	(Austria) GAK
Mortansson 50', 58'	Report	Akwuegbu 60', 90'

Tórsvøllur, Tórshavn
Attendance: 500
Referee: Romans Lajuks (Latvia)
23 August 2001
20:15

GAK (Austria)	4–0	(Faroe Islands) HB
Brunmayr 13', 35'; Tokić 70'; Milinković 90'	Report

Arnold Schwarzenegger Stadion, Graz
Attendance: 6,245
Referee: Gevorg Hovhannisyan (Armenia)

GAK won 6–2 on aggregate.

9 August 2001
17:00

Atlantas (Lithuania)	0–4	(Romania) Rapid București
	Report	Schumacher 18'; Pancu 46'; Niță 66'; Șumudică 90'

Central Stadium of Klaipėda, Klaipėda
Attendance: 3,111
Referee: Dimitar Dimitrov (Bulgaria)
23 August 2001
17:00

Rapid București (Romania)	8–0	(Lithuania) Atlantas
Niță 24', 85'; Șumudică 28', 55' (pen.); Schumacher 59'; Bogdanović 72', 90'; Bratu 73'	Report

Giulești-Valentin Stănescu, Bucharest
Attendance: 2,980
Referee: Olegário Benquerença (Portugal)

Rapid București won 12–0 on aggregate.

9 August 2001
16:30

Matador Púchov (Slovakia)	3–0	(Malta) Sliema Wanderers
Breška 10'; Perniš 66' (pen.); Belák 72'	Report

Mestský štadión, Púchov
Attendance: 4,200
Referee: Sead Kulović (Bosnia and Herzegovina)
23 August 2001
19:30

Sliema Wanderers (Malta)	2–1	(Slovakia) Matador Púchov
Busuttil 6'; Said 85'	Report	Perniš 59' (pen.)

Ta' Qali National Stadium, Attard
Attendance: 500
Referee: Sokol Jareci (Albania)

Matador Púchov won 4–2 on aggregate.

9 August 2001
20:30

Longford Town (Republic of Ireland)	1–1	(Bulgaria) Litex Lovech
Petev 14' (o.g.)	Report	Lavine 84' (o.g.)

Flancare Park, Longford
Attendance: 2,922
Referee: Bujar Pregja (Albania)
23 August 2001
19:30

Litex Lovech (Bulgaria)	2–0	(Republic of Ireland) Longford Town
Janković 90', 90+3' (pen.)	Report

Lovech Stadium, Lovech
Attendance: 4,000
Referee: Tommy Skjerven (Norway)

Litex Lovech won 3–1 on aggregate.

9 August 2001
20:30

Brøndby (Denmark)	2–0	(Republic of Ireland) Shelbourne
Jonson 16'; Bagger 80'	Report

Brøndby Stadium, Brøndbyvester
Attendance: 8,011
Referee: Sinisa Zrnić (Bosnia and Herzegovina)
23 August 2001
19:45

Shelbourne (Republic of Ireland)	0–3	(Denmark) Brøndby
	Report	Bagger 12'; Jørgensen 54'; Madsen 78'

Tolka Park, Dublin
Attendance: 3,000
Referee: Yuri Klyuchnikov (Russia)

Brøndby won 5–0 on aggregate.

9 August 2001
20:30

FC Santa Coloma (Andorra)	0–1	(Federal Republic of Yugoslavia) Partizan
	Report	Čakar 7'

Estadi Comunal d'Andorra la Vella, Andorra la Vella
Attendance: 900
Referee: Sergo Kvaratskhelia (Georgia)
23 August 2001
19:30

Partizan (Federal Republic of Yugoslavia)	7–1	(Andorra) FC Santa Coloma
Ivić 12', 60'; Delibašić 21'; Čakar 68', 88' (pen.); Vukić 79'; Iliev 90'	Report	Juli Fernández 38' (pen.)

Partizan Stadium, Belgrade
Attendance: 5,800
Referee: Oleg Timofejev (Estonia)

Partizan won 8–1 on aggregate.

9 August 2001
19:00

Maccabi Tel Aviv (Israel)	6–0	(Lithuania) Žalgiris
Ben-Dayan 7'; Dego 21', 45', 77'; Banin 51'; Biton 80'	Report

Bloomfield Stadium, Tel Aviv
Attendance: 6,726
Referee: Bülent Uzun (Turkey)
23 August 2001
17:00

Žalgiris (Lithuania)	0–1	(Israel) Maccabi Tel Aviv
	Report	Goldberg 58'

Žalgiris Stadium, Vilnius
Attendance: 700
Referee: Hubert Byrne (Republic of Ireland)

Maccabi Tel Aviv won 7–0 on aggregate.

9 August 2001
18:00

Shakhtyor Soligorsk (Belarus)	1–2	(Bulgaria) CSKA Sofia
Podrez 81'	Report	Manchev 65'; Giglio 79'

Dinamo Stadium, Minsk
Attendance: 1,650
Referee: Egill Már Markusson (Iceland)
23 August 2001
19:00

CSKA Sofia (Bulgaria)	3–1	(Belarus) Shakhtyor Soligorsk
Manchev 16', 63'; Giglio 68'	Report	Bezborodov 90'

Balgarska Armiya Stadium, Sofia
Attendance: 3,640
Referee: Mika Peltola (Finland)

CSKA Sofia won 5–2 on aggregate.

9 August 2001
19:00

MYPA (Finland)	1–3	(Sweden) Helsingborgs IF
Lindberg 50'	Report	Eklund 26'; Prica 47'; Lindström 86'

Saviniemi, Anjalankoski
Attendance: 1,702
Referee: Manfred Schüttengruber (Austria)
23 August 2001
19:00

Helsingborgs IF (Sweden)	2–1	(Finland) MYPA
Prica 45'; Eklund 82'	Report	Puhakainen 26'

Olympia, Helsingborg
Attendance: 3,738
Referee: Haim Yaakov (Israel)

Helsingborgs IF won 5–2 on aggregate.

9 August 2001
17:00

Dinamo Tbilisi (Georgia (country))	2–1	(Belarus) BATE Borisov
Daraselia 22' (pen.); Mikuchadze 86'	Report	Hancharyk 88'

Boris Paichadze National Stadium, Tbilisi
Attendance: 4,500
Referee: Mark Halsey (England)
23 August 2001
16:00

BATE Borisov (Belarus)	4–0	(Georgia (country)) Dinamo Tbilisi
Lisovskiy 22'; Kutuzov 43' (pen.); Loshankov 50'; Grigorov 89'	Report

Haradski Stadium, Barysaw
Attendance: 4,420
Referee: Johny Ver Eecke (Belgium)

BATE Borisov won 5–2 on aggregate.

9 August 2001
20:15

Debrecen (Hungary)	3–0	(Moldova) Nistru Otaci
Bajzát 25'; Ulveczki 35'; Tiber 82'	Report

Stadion Oláh Gábor Út, Debrecen
Attendance: 3,200
Referee: Georgios Borovilos (Greece)
23 August 2001
19:00

Nistru Otaci (Moldova)	1–0	(Hungary) Debrecen
Shmakov 53' (pen.)	Report

Stadionul Republican, Chișinău
Attendance: 3,500
Referee: Zbigniew Marczyk (Poland)

Nistru Otaci won 3–1 on aggregate.

9 August 2001
17:00

Polonia Warsaw (Poland)	4–0	(Wales) Total Network Solutions
Tarachulski 70', 78'; Moskal 90+2', 90+3'	Report

Stadion Widzewa, Łódź
Attendance: 300
Referee: Marco Tura (San Marino)
23 August 2001
21:45

Total Network Solutions (Wales)	0–2	(Poland) Polonia Warsaw
	Report	Bąk 42'; Bartczak 53'

Racecourse Ground, Wrexham
Attendance: 273
Referee: Dragan Tripković (FR Yugoslavia)

Polonia Warsaw won 6–0 on aggregate.

9 August 2001
19:30

Birkirkara (Malta)	0–0	(Georgia (country)) Locomotive Tbilisi
	Report

Ta' Qali National Stadium, Attard
Attendance: 495
Referee: Stephen Weatherall (Northern Ireland)
23 August 2001
17:00

Locomotive Tbilisi (Georgia (country))	1–1	(Malta) Birkirkara
Anchabadze 87'	Report	Zahra 14'

Lokomotivi Stadium, Tbilisi
Attendance: 5,000
Referee: Charles Schaack (Luxembourg)

1–1 on aggregate; Birkirkara won on away goals.

9 August 2001
20:30

AEK Athens (Greece)	6–0	(Luxembourg) Grevenmacher
Tsiartas 39'; Zagorakis 42'; Lakis 54'; Nikolaidis 66', 90'; Konstantinidis 70'	Report

Nikos Goumas Stadium, Nea Filadelfeia
Attendance: 6,082
Referee: Ghenadie Orlic (Moldova)
23 August 2001
20:30

Grevenmacher (Luxembourg)	0–2	(Greece) AEK Athens
	Report	Lakis 26'; Konstantinidis 88'

Stade Josy Barthel, Luxembourg City
Attendance: 600
Referee: Brian Lawlor (Wales)

AEK Athens won 8–0 on aggregate.

9 August 2001
16:30

Ružomberok (Slovakia)	3–1	(Belarus) Belshina Bobruisk
Fabuľa 22', 83' (pen.); Oravec 42'	Report	Sednev 58' (pen.)

Štadión MFK Ružomberok, Ružomberok
Attendance: 2,765
Referee: Bruno Coué (France)
23 August 2001
18:00

Belshina Bobruisk (Belarus)	0–0	(Slovakia) Ružomberok
	Report

Dinamo Stadium, Minsk
Attendance: 1,063
Referee: Peter Fröjdfeldt (Sweden)

Ružomberok won 3–1 on aggregate.

9 August 2001
19:30

Olympiakos Nicosia (Cyprus)	2–2	(Hungary) Dunaferr
Themistokleous 49'; Kožlej 78'	Report	Sowunmi 15'; Tököli 50'

GSP Stadium, Nicosia
Attendance: 3,000
Referee: Drago Kos (Slovenia)
23 August 2001
20:00

Dunaferr (Hungary)	2–4	(Cyprus) Olympiakos Nicosia
Sowunmi 46'; Tököli 61'	Report	Kožlej 24'; Radosavljev 37'; Themistokleous 57'; Aristokleous 64'

Stadion ETO, Győr
Attendance: 3,700
Referee: Sašo Lazarevski (Macedonia)

Olympiakos Nicosia won 6–4 on aggregate.

9 August 2001
19:30

Vaduz (Liechtenstein)	3–3	(Croatia) Varteks
Niederhäuser 41'; Merenda 53', 75'	Report	Bjelanović 49', 85', 86'

Rheinpark Stadion, Vaduz
Attendance: 1,065
Referee: Loizos Loizou (Cyprus)
23 August 2001
20:00

Varteks (Croatia)	6–1	(Liechtenstein) Vaduz
Mumlek 8' (pen.); Bjelanović 20'; Andričević 25'; Drobne 71', 75'; Režić 86'	Report	Merenda 48'

Stadion Varteks, Varaždin
Attendance: 2,070
Referee: Sorin Altmayer (Romania)

Varteks won 9–4 on aggregate.
