= 1992–93 UEFA Champions League second round =

Football results

The 1992–93 UEFA Champions League second round was the second stage of the competition proper of the 1992–93 UEFA Champions League, and featured the 16 winners from the first round. It began on 21 October with the first legs and ended on 4 November 1992 with the second legs. The eight winners advanced to the group stage.

Times are CET (UTC+1), as listed by UEFA.

== Teams ==
The 16 winners of the first round advanced to the second round.

Key to colours
Winners of second round advanced to group stage

Second round participants
Team	Coeff.
(Spain) Barcelona	2.974
(France) Marseille	3.116
(Italy) Milan	3.052
(Belgium) Club Brugge	2.594
(Portugal) Porto	2.476
(Netherlands) PSV Eindhoven	2.412
(Poland) Lech Poznań	2.339
(Romania) Dinamo București	2.323
(Scotland) Rangers	2.287
(Russia) CSKA Moscow	2.116
(Sweden) IFK Göteborg	2.080
Austria Wien	2.029
(Switzerland) Sion	1.993
(Greece) AEK Athens	1.974
(Czechoslovakia) Slovan Bratislava	1.777
(England) Leeds United	1.371

Notes

1. ^{TH} Title holders

== Format ==
Each tie was played over two legs, with each team playing one leg at home. The team that scored more goals on aggregate over the two legs advanced to the next round. If the aggregate score was level, the away goals rule was applied, i.e. the team that scored more goals away from home over the two legs advanced. If away goals were also equal, then extra time was played. The away goals rule would be again applied after extra time, i.e. if there were goals scored during extra time and the aggregate score was still level, the visiting team advanced by virtue of more away goals scored. If no goals were scored during extra time, the tie was decided by penalty shoot-out.

== Seeding ==
The draw for the second round was held on 2 October 1992 in Geneva, Switzerland. The sixteen teams were divided into a seeded and unseeded pot, each containing eight teams, for the draw.

Seeded	Unseeded
(Spain) Barcelona; (France) Marseille; (Italy) Milan; (England) Leeds United; (Belgium) Club Brugge; (Portugal) Porto; (Netherlands) PSV Eindhoven; (Poland) Lech Poznań	(Romania) Dinamo București; (Scotland) Rangers; (Russia) CSKA Moscow; (Sweden) IFK Göteborg; Austria Wien; (Switzerland) Sion; (Greece) AEK Athens; (Czechoslovakia) Slovan Bratislava

Notes

1. ^{†} German club VfB Stuttgart originally took part in the draw, but their second-leg match of the first round was later awarded to Leeds United. The tie went to a play-off, which Leeds United won. Thus Leeds United effectively took the seeding coefficient of VfB Stuttgart (2.710) in the draw.

== Summary ==
The first legs were played on 21 October, and the second legs on 4 November 1992.

Team 1	Agg.	Team 2	1st leg	2nd leg
IFK Göteborg (Sweden)	4–0	(Poland) Lech Poznań	1–0	3–0
Rangers (Scotland)	4–2	(England) Leeds United	2–1	2–1
Slovan Bratislava (Czechoslovakia)	0–5	(Italy) Milan	0–1	0–4
Dinamo București (Romania)	0–2	(France) Marseille	0–0	0–2
Club Brugge (Belgium)	3–3 (a)	Austria Wien	2–0	1–3
Sion (Switzerland)	2–6	(Portugal) Porto	2–2	0–4
AEK Athens (Greece)	1–3	(Netherlands) PSV Eindhoven	1–0	0–3
CSKA Moscow (Russia)	4–3	(Spain) Barcelona	1–1	3–2

== Matches ==
21 October 1992
19:00

IFK Göteborg (Sweden)	1–0	(Poland) Lech Poznań
Bengtsson 87'	Report

Ullevi, Gothenburg
Attendance: 9,800
Referee: Roger Philippi (Luxembourg)
4 November 1992
18:30

Lech Poznań (Poland)	0–3	(Sweden) IFK Göteborg
	Report	Ekström 28'; Nilsson 47'; Mild 82'

Stadion Miejski, Poznań
Attendance: 14,470
Referee: Pat Kelly (Republic of Ireland)

IFK Göteborg won 4–0 on aggregate.

21 October 1992
20:05

Rangers (Scotland)	2–1	(England) Leeds United
Lukic 21' (o.g.); McCoist 37'	Report	McAllister 1'

Ibrox Park, Glasgow
Attendance: 43,251
Referee: Alphonse Constantin (Belgium)
4 November 1992
20:05

Leeds United (England)	1–2	(Scotland) Rangers
Cantona 85'	Report	Hateley 2'; McCoist 59'

Elland Road, Leeds
Attendance: 25,118
Referee: Aleksey Spirin (Russia)

Rangers won 4–2 on aggregate.

21 October 1992
20:15

Slovan Bratislava (Czechoslovakia)	0–1	(Italy) Milan
	Report	Maldini 62'

Tehelné pole, Bratislava
Attendance: 33,467
Referee: Kim Milton Nielsen (Denmark)
4 November 1992
20:30

Milan (Italy)	4–0	(Czechoslovakia) Slovan Bratislava
Boban 29'; Rijkaard 30'; Simone 50'; Papin 72'	Report

San Siro, Milan
Attendance: 26,798
Referee: Antonio Martín Navarrete (Spain)

Milan won 5–0 on aggregate.

21 October 1992
18:00

Dinamo București (Romania)	0–0	(France) Marseille
	Report

Stadionul Dinamo, Bucharest
Attendance: 14,000
Referee: Peter Mikkelsen (Denmark)
4 November 1992
19:00

Marseille (France)	2–0	(Romania) Dinamo București
Bokšić 32', 67'	Report

Stade Vélodrome, Marseille
Attendance: 13,275
Referee: Arcangelo Pezzella (Italy)

Marseille won 2–0 on aggregate.

21 October 1992
20:30

Club Brugge (Belgium)	2–0	Austria Wien
Verheyen 22'; Booy 41'	Report

Olympiastadion, Bruges
Attendance: 15,858
Referee: Serge Muhmenthaler (Switzerland)
4 November 1992
19:30

Austria Wien	3–1	(Belgium) Club Brugge
Zsak 49'; Fridrikas 73'; Hasenhüttl 90'	Report	Van Der Heyden 64'

Gerhard-Hanappi-Stadion, Vienna
Attendance: 12,500
Referee: Vassilios Nikakis (Greece)

3–3 on aggregate; Club Brugge won on away goals.

21 October 1992
20:30

Sion (Switzerland)	2–2	(Portugal) Porto
Orlando 55'; Assis 60'	Report	Semedo 80'; F. Couto 83'

Stade de Tourbillon, Sion
Attendance: 13,200
Referee: John Blankenstein (Netherlands)
4 November 1992
21:30

Porto (Portugal)	4–0	(Switzerland) Sion
Jorge Costa 50'; Kostadinov 63'; Domingos 85'; Magalhães 87'	Report

Estádio das Antas, Porto
Attendance: 20,000
Referee: Brian Hill (England)

Porto won 6–2 on aggregate.

21 October 1992
18:00

AEK Athens (Greece)	1–0	(Netherlands) PSV Eindhoven
Dimitriadis 53'	Report

Nikos Goumas Stadium, Nea Filadelfeia
Attendance: 31,049
Referee: Hubert Forstinger (Austria)
4 November 1992
20:15

PSV Eindhoven (Netherlands)	3–0	(Greece) AEK Athens
Romário 5', 51', 84'	Report

Philips Stadion, Eindhoven
Attendance: 26,500
Referee: Fabio Baldas (Italy)

PSV Eindhoven won 3–1 on aggregate.

21 October 1992
20:00

CSKA Moscow (Russia)	1–1	(Spain) Barcelona
Grishin 18'	Report	Begiristain 59'

Luzhniki Stadium, Moscow
Attendance: 20,000
Referee: Kurt Röthlisberger (Switzerland)
4 November 1992
20:45

Barcelona (Spain)	2–3	(Russia) CSKA Moscow
Nadal 12'; Begiristain 31'	Report	Bushmanov 44'; Mashkarin 57'; Karsakov 61'

Estadi del Futbol Club Barcelona, Barcelona
Attendance: 65,000
Referee: Bernd Heynemann (Germany)

CSKA Moscow won 4–3 on aggregate.
