= 1992–93 UEFA Champions League preliminary round =

European football tournament

The 1992–93 UEFA Champions League preliminary round was the qualifying round for the 1992–93 UEFA Champions League, and featured eight teams. It began on 19 August with the first legs and ended on 2 September 1992 with the second legs. The four winners advanced to the first round, joining 28 other teams.

Times are CEST (UTC+2), as listed by UEFA.

== Format ==
Each tie was played over two legs, with each team playing one leg at home. The team that scored more goals on aggregate over the two legs advanced to the next round. If the aggregate score was level, the away goals rule was applied, i.e. the team that scored more goals away from home over the two legs advanced. If away goals were also equal, then extra time was played. The away goals rule would be again applied after extra time, i.e. if there were goals scored during extra time and the aggregate score was still level, the visiting team advanced by virtue of more away goals scored. If no goals were scored during extra time, the tie was decided by penalty shoot-out.

== Teams and draw ==
The eight-lowest teams in the 1992 UEFA seeding coefficient ranking entered into the preliminary round. The draw for the preliminary round was held on 15 July 1992 in Geneva, Switzerland. It is unclear whether any seeding was used.

Key to colours
Winners of preliminary round advanced to first round

Preliminary round participants
Team	Coeff.
(Republic of Ireland) Shelbourne	0.269
(Malta) Valletta	0.200
(Faroe Islands) KÍ	0.000
(Israel) Maccabi Tel Aviv	0.000
(Estonia) Norma Tallinn	0.000
(Slovenia) Olimpija Ljubljana	0.000
(Latvia) Skonto	0.000
(Ukraine) Tavriya Simferopol	0.000

== Summary ==
The first legs were played on 19 August, and the second legs on 2 September 1992.

Team 1	Agg.	Team 2	1st leg	2nd leg
Shelbourne (Republic of Ireland)	1–2	(Ukraine) Tavriya Simferopol	0–0	1–2
Valletta (Malta)	1–3	(Israel) Maccabi Tel Aviv	1–2	0–1
KÍ (Faroe Islands)	1–6	(Latvia) Skonto	1–3	0–3
Olimpija Ljubljana (Slovenia)	5–0	(Estonia) Norma Tallinn	3–0	2–0

== Matches ==
19 August 1992
20:30

Shelbourne (Republic of Ireland)	0–0	(Ukraine) Tavriya Simferopol
	Report

Tolka Park, Dublin
Attendance: 3,700
Referee: Anders Frisk (Sweden)
2 September 1992
18:00

Tavriya Simferopol (Ukraine)	2–1	(Republic of Ireland) Shelbourne
Shevchenko 10'; Sheikhametov 15'	Report	Dully 42'

Lokomotiv Stadium, Simferopol
Attendance: 10,500
Referee: Gerd Grabher (Austria)

Tavriya Simferopol won 2–1 on aggregate.

19 August 1992
17:30

Valletta (Malta)	1–2	(Israel) Maccabi Tel Aviv
Zerafa 75'	Report	A. Cohen 81'; Nimni 88'

National Stadium, Ta' Qali
Attendance: 1,234
Referee: Ahmet Çakar (Turkey)
2 September 1992
18:00

Maccabi Tel Aviv (Israel)	1–0	(Malta) Valletta
M. Melika 24'	Report

Ramat Gan Stadium, Ramat Gan
Attendance: 3,200
Referee: Vassilios Nikakis (Greece)

Maccabi Tel Aviv won 3–1 on aggregate.

19 August 1992
17:00

KÍ (Faroe Islands)	1–3	(Latvia) Skonto
Danielsen 46'	Report	Astafjevs 28', 46'; Semjonovs 90'

Svangaskarð, Toftir
Attendance: 1,130
Referee: Rune Pedersen (Norway)
2 September 1992
17:00

Skonto (Latvia)	3–0	(Faroe Islands) KÍ
Jeļisejevs 3'; Semjonovs 37'; Astafjevs 51'	Report

Skonto Stadium, Riga
Attendance: 1,200
Referee: Ilkka Koho (Finland)

Skonto won 6–1 on aggregate.

19 August 1992
18:15

Olimpija Ljubljana (Slovenia)	3–0	(Estonia) Norma Tallinn
Ubavič 48' (pen.); Topić 50'; Vrabac 60'	Report

Stadion Bežigrad, Ljubljana
Attendance: 1,587
Referee: Daniel Roduit (Switzerland)
2 September 1992
16:00

Norma Tallinn (Estonia)	0–2	(Slovenia) Olimpija Ljubljana
	Report	Zulič 27'; Djuranović 80'

Rannavärava staadion, Tallinn
Attendance: 1,235
Referee: Finn Lambek (Denmark)

Olimpija Ljubljana won 5–0 on aggregate.
