= 1996–97 UEFA Champions League qualifying round =

European football tournament

The 1996–97 UEFA Champions League featured 24 teams, with eight teams (the seven top-ranked league champions in the UEFA clubs coefficient table, plus the defending champions from 1995–96) qualifying automatically for the group stage and the remaining 16 (the league champions ranked 8–23 in the coefficient table) playing in a two-legged preliminary round. The winners of each tie entered the Champions League group stage, while the losers entered the UEFA Cup first round.

== Teams ==
The sixteen lowest-ranked associations with teams that qualified for the Champions League entered the qualifying round.

Key to colours
Winners of qualifying round advanced to group stage
Losers of qualifying round entered UEFA Cup first round

Qualifying round participants
Assoc.	Team
8	(Belgium) Club Brugge
9	(Greece) Panathinaikos
10	(Russia) Alania Vladikavkaz
11	(Turkey) Fenerbahçe
12	(Denmark) Brøndby
13	(Austria) Rapid Wien
14	(Sweden) IFK Göteborg
15	(Switzerland) Grasshopper
16	(Czech Republic) Slavia Prague
17	(Scotland) Rangers
18	(Norway) Rosenborg
19	(Ukraine) Dynamo Kyiv
20	(Hungary) Ferencváros
21	(Romania) Steaua București
22	(Poland) Widzew Łódź
23	(Israel) Maccabi Tel Aviv

== Seeding ==
The sixteen teams were divided into seeded and unseeded pots, each containing eight teams, for the draw based on their association's ranking.

Seeded	Unseeded
(Belgium) Club Brugge; (Greece) Panathinaikos; (Russia) Alania Vladikavkaz; (Turkey) Fenerbahçe; (Denmark) Brøndby; (Austria) Rapid Wien; (Sweden) IFK Göteborg; (Switzerland) Grasshopper	(Czech Republic) Slavia Prague; (Scotland) Rangers; (Norway) Rosenborg; (Ukraine) Dynamo Kyiv; (Hungary) Ferencváros; (Romania) Steaua București; (Poland) Widzew Łódź; (Israel) Maccabi Tel Aviv

== Summary ==
The winners of each tie in the preliminary round entered the Champions League group stage, whilst the losers entered the UEFA Cup first round.

Team 1	Agg.	Team 2	1st leg	2nd leg
Maccabi Tel Aviv (Israel)	1–2	(Turkey) Fenerbahçe	0–1	1–1
Rangers (Scotland)	10–3	(Russia) Alania Vladikavkaz	3–1	7–2
Panathinaikos (Greece)	1–3	(Norway) Rosenborg	1–0	0–3 (a.e.t.)
IFK Göteborg (Sweden)	4–1	(Hungary) Ferencváros	3–0	1–1
Widzew Łódź (Poland)	4–4 (a)	(Denmark) Brøndby	2–1	2–3
Grasshopper (Switzerland)	6–0	(Czech Republic) Slavia Prague	5–0	1–0
Club Brugge (Belgium)	2–5	(Romania) Steaua București	2–2	0–3
Rapid Wien (Austria)	6–2	(Ukraine) Dynamo Kyiv	2–0	4–2

== Matches ==
7 August 1996
19:30

Maccabi Tel Aviv (Israel)	0–1	(Turkey) Fenerbahçe
	Report	Kemalettin 43'

Ramat Gan Stadium, Ramat Gan
Attendance: 20,000
Referee: Günter Benkö (Austria)
21 August 1996
20:00

Fenerbahçe (Turkey)	1–1	(Israel) Maccabi Tel Aviv
Okocha 19'	Report	Driks 76'

Fenerbahçe Stadium, Istanbul
Attendance: 23,188
Referee: László Vágner (Hungary)

Fenerbahçe won 2–1 on aggregate.

7 August 1996
20:00

Rangers (Scotland)	3–1	(Russia) Alania Vladikavkaz
McInnes 51'; McCoist 60'; Petrić 77'	Report	Yanovsky 29'

Ibrox Park, Glasgow
Attendance: 44,799
Referee: Markus Merk (Germany)
21 August 1996
20:00

Alania Vladikavkaz (Russia)	2–7	(Scotland) Rangers
Yanovsky 15'; Suleymanov 23' (pen.)	Report	McCoist 1', 13', 18'; Van Vossen 40'; Laudrup 56', 83'; Miller 87'

Republican Spartak Stadium, Vladikavkaz
Attendance: 33,000
Referee: Urs Meier (Switzerland)

Rangers won 10–3 on aggregate.

7 August 1996
21:15

Panathinaikos (Greece)	1–0	(Norway) Rosenborg
Warzycha 19'	Report

Olympic Stadium, Athens
Attendance: 33,095
Referee: Michel Piraux (Belgium)
21 August 1996
19:30

Rosenborg (Norway)	3–0 (a.e.t.)	(Greece) Panathinaikos
Strand 63'; Iversen 94'; Heggem 97'	Report

Lerkendal Stadion, Trondheim
Attendance: 18,625
Referee: Paul Durkin (England)

Rosenborg won 3–1 on aggregate.

7 August 1996
19:00

IFK Göteborg (Sweden)	3–0	(Hungary) Ferencváros
Blomqvist 37'; Pettersson 49', 56'	Report

Idrottsparken, Norrköping
Attendance: 5,513
Referee: Alain Sars (France)
21 August 1996
20:30

Ferencváros (Hungary)	1–1	(Sweden) IFK Göteborg
Horváth 13'	Report	A. Andersson 87'

Üllői úti Stadion, Budapest
Attendance: 5,925
Referee: José María García-Aranda (Spain)

IFK Göteborg won 4–1 on aggregate.

7 August 1996
20:15

Widzew Łódź (Poland)	2–1	(Denmark) Brøndby
Dembiński 63'; Majak 73'	Report	Bjur 75'

Widzew Łódź Stadium, Łódź
Attendance: 6,300
Referee: Mario van der Ende (Netherlands)
21 August 1996
20:05

Brøndby (Denmark)	3–2	(Poland) Widzew Łódź
Møller 31'; Bjur 44'; Vilfort 47'	Report	Citko 56'; Wojtala 88'

Brøndby Stadion, Brøndbyvester
Attendance: 10,438
Referee: Ahmet Çakar (Turkey)

4–4 on aggregate; Widzew Łódź won on away goals.

7 August 1996
20:15

Grasshopper (Switzerland)	5–0	(Czech Republic) Slavia Prague
Türkyilmaz 11', 46'; Esposito 43'; Moldovan 57'; Koller 89'	Report

Hardturm, Zurich
Attendance: 9,300
Referee: Jorge Coroado (Portugal)
21 August 1996
20:15

Slavia Prague (Czech Republic)	0–1	(Switzerland) Grasshopper
	Report	Türkyilmaz 70'

Stadion Evžena Rošického, Prague
Attendance: 3,012
Referee: Kim Milton Nielsen (Denmark)

Grasshopper won 6–0 on aggregate.

7 August 1996
20:00

Club Brugge (Belgium)	2–2	(Romania) Steaua București
Nielsen 27'; Špehar 54'	Report	A. Ilie 45', 62'

Olympiastadion, Bruges
Attendance: 10,755
Referee: Rune Pedersen (Norway)
21 August 1996
21:00

Steaua București (Romania)	3–0	(Belgium) Club Brugge
A. Ilie 32' (pen.), 44'; Nagy 55'	Report

Stadionul Steaua, Bucharest
Attendance: 10,912
Referee: Pierluigi Collina (Italy)

Steaua București won 5–2 on aggregate.

7 August 1996
20:30

Rapid Wien (Austria)	2–0	(Ukraine) Dynamo Kyiv
Stumpf 8'; Guggi 90'	Report

Ernst-Happel-Stadion, Vienna
Attendance: 29,500
Referee: Anders Frisk (Sweden)
21 August 1996
19:00

Dynamo Kyiv (Ukraine)	2–4	(Austria) Rapid Wien
Kalitvintsev 6'; Maksymov 77'	Report	Ivanov 20', 40'; Kühbauer 29'; Holovko 62' (o.g.)

NSK Olimpiyskyi, Kyiv
Attendance: 70,000
Referee: Serge Muhmenthaler (Switzerland)

Rapid Wien won 6–2 on aggregate.
