= Yevgeni Bushmanov =

Russian footballer

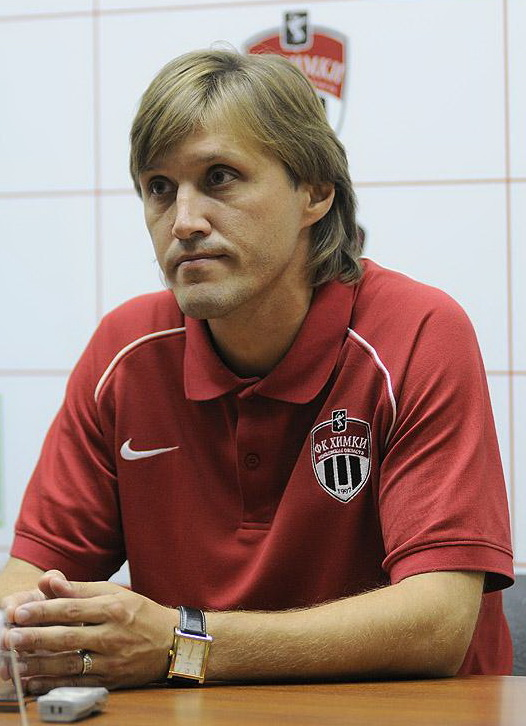
- Yevgeni Bushmanov in 2010

Personal information
- Full name: Yevgeni Aleksandrovich Bushmanov
- Date of birth: 2 November 1971 (age 54)
- Place of birth: Tyumen, Soviet Union
- Height: 1.80 m (5 ft 11 in)
- Position: Defender

Youth career
- Shinnik Yaroslavl

Senior career*
Years	Team	Apps	(Gls)
1988–1989	Shinnik Yaroslavl	18	(1)
1989–1992	Spartak Moscow	12	(1)
1992–1996	CSKA Moscow	121	(3)
1997–1998	Torpedo Moscow	43	(2)
1997	Torpedo-2	1	(0)
1998–2000	Spartak Moscow	46	(1)
2000	Spartak-2 Moscow	2	(0)
2001–2003	Krylia Sovetov Samara	71	(0)
Total		314	(8)

International career
1991	USSR U20	6	(0)
1991	USSR U21	1	(0)
1992–1993	Russia U21	11	(0)
1996–2000	Russia	7	(0)

Managerial career
- 2004: Shinnik Yaroslavl (reserves)
- 2005–2007: Saturn Moscow Oblast (reserves)
- 2008: Lokomotiv Moscow (assistant)
- 2010: Khimki (assistant)
- 2010: Khimki
- 2013: Strogino Moscow
- 2013–2017: Spartak-2 Moscow
- 2017–2018: Russia U-21
- 2021–2022: Spartak-2 Moscow
- 2023: Veles Moscow
- * Club domestic league appearances and goals

Yevgeni Aleksandrovich Bushmanov (Russian: Евгений Александрович Бушманов; born 2 November 1971) is a Russian football coach and a former player.

== Playing career ==
Bushmanov played for Shinnik Yaroslavl, Spartak Moscow, CSKA Moscow, Torpedo Moscow and Krylia Sovetov Samara. He played seven matches for Russia national football team and was a participant at the Euro 1996.

In March 1991, he was a late substitute in the return leg of the 1990–91 European Cup quarterfinal as Spartak Moscow eliminated Real Madrid at the Santiago Bernabéu Stadium and reached semi-finals.

Two months after transferring from Spartak to CSKA in August 1992, Bushmanov scored the first CSKA goal in a 3–2 away defeat of Barcelona in the 1992–93 UEFA Champions League second round that allowed CSKA to qualify for the group stage (which included top 8 teams at the time). He is the only Russian player to knock out both El Clásico clubs from the Champions League.

== Coaching career ==
Since finishing his playing career, Bushmanov worked as a reserve team coach (first with Shinnik, then with Saturn).

After failing to pass the 2019 UEFA European Under-21 Championship qualification with Russia U-21, he left the team by mutual consent on 23 October 2018.

== Honours ==
- European under-21 champion in 1990 with USSR
- Russian Premier League winner in 1992, 1998, 1999, 2000
- Soviet Cup winner in 1992

== Career statistics ==
Club	Season	League			Cup		Continental		Total	
Club	Season	Division	Apps	Goals	Apps	Goals	Apps	Goals	Apps	Goals
Shinnik Yaroslavl	1988	Soviet First League	9	1	1	0	–		10	1
Shinnik Yaroslavl	1988	Soviet First League	9	0	2	1	–		11	1
Shinnik Yaroslavl	Total		18	1	2	1	0	0	21	2
Spartak Moscow	1989	Soviet Top League	0	0	0	0	0	0	0	0
Spartak Moscow	1990	Soviet Top League	2	0	0	0	1 (Note: Appearance in the European Cup)	0	3	0
Spartak Moscow	1991	Soviet Top League	8	1	1	0	4 (Note: Two appearances in the European Cup, two appearances in the UEFA Cup)	0	13	1
Spartak Moscow	1992	Russian Premier League	2	0	1	0	–		3	0
Spartak Moscow	Total		12	1	2	0	5	0	19	1
CSKA Moscow	1992	Russian Premier League	7	0	2	0	5 (Note: Appearances in the UEFA Champions League)	1	14	1
CSKA Moscow	1993	Russian Premier League	30	0	3	1	4	0	37	1
CSKA Moscow	1994	Russian Premier League	24	2	5	0	1 (Note: Appearance in the UEFA Cup Winners' Cup)	0	30	2
CSKA Moscow	1995	Russian Premier League	29	1	2	1	–		31	2
CSKA Moscow	1996	Russian Premier League	31	0	1	0	3 (Note: Appearances in the UEFA Cup)	0	35	0
CSKA Moscow	Total		121	3	13	2	13	1	147	6
Torpedo Moscow	1997	Russian Premier League	29	1	3	1	4 (Note: Appearances in the UEFA Intertoto Cup)	0	36	2
Torpedo Moscow	1998	Russian Premier League	14	1	1	0	–		15	1
Torpedo Moscow	Total		43	2	4	1	4	0	51	3
Torpedo-2	1997	Russian Third League	1	0	–		–		1	0
Spartak Moscow	1998	Russian Premier League	14	1	1	0	8	0	23	1
Spartak Moscow	1999	Russian Premier League	9	0	0	0	10 (Note: Eight appearances in the UEFA Champions League, two appearances in the UEFA Cup)	0	19	0
Spartak Moscow	2000	Russian Premier League	23	0	4	0	2	0	29	0
Spartak Moscow	Total		46	1	5	0	2	0	71	1
Spartak-2 Moscow	2000	Russian Second League	2	0	–		–		2	0
Krylia Sovetov Samara	2001	Russian Premier League	28	0	4	1	–		32	1
Krylia Sovetov Samara	2002	Russian Premier League	29	0	3	0	4	0	36	0
Krylia Sovetov Samara	2003	Russian Premier League	14	0	1	0	–		15	0
Krylia Sovetov Samara	Total		71	0	8	1	4	0	83	1
Career total			314	8	35	5	46	1	395	14
