= Padraig Dully =

Irish footballer

Personal information
- Date of birth: 20 April 1964 (age 62)
- Place of birth: Athlone, Ireland
- Position: Striker

Senior career*
Years	Team	Apps	(Gls)
1985–1990	Athlone Town	111	(30)
1990–1995	Shelbourne	97	(33)
1995	Cliftonville	5	(0)
1995–1996	Shamrock Rovers	11	(3)
1995–1996	Bohemians	12	(4)
1996	→ Crusaders (loan)	6	(1)
1996–1997	→ Longford Town (loan)		(4)
1997–1999	Waterford United		
- * Club domestic league appearances and goals

Padraig Dully (born 20 April 1965) is an Irish retired footballer who played during the 1980s and 1990s.

== Career ==
Dully's career began with Athlone Town and he made his League of Ireland debut on 20 October 1985 at home to Cork City. His first League of Ireland goal came a fortnight later in a 1–0 home win over Shelbourne.

In the 1989/90 season he finished as Athlone's top scorer with 10 league goals. His impressive form earned him a move to Shelbourne in the close season of 1990, where he played the best football of his career. It was certainly the most rewarding period of his footballing travels. In 1992, he won the league with Shelbourne, beating Derry City in the title race. Dully scored against SC Tavriya Simferopol in the 1992-93 UEFA Champions League.

Dully was man of the match in the 1993 FAI Cup final win and he played a full part in the dramatic play-offs in 1992–93 League of Ireland Premier Division as well. Shels finished level on points on top of the table alongside Cork City and Bohemians. The first series of matches failed to produce a conclusive winner, but the second series did, with Cork pipping Bohs into second.

Dully's career then took a turn for the worse - a serious knee injury almost ended his playing days, in fact he was out of the game for a year. Despite making a full recovery, he was unable to get back into the Shelbourne first team.

He signed for Shamrock Rovers on 26 October 1995 for an undisclosed fee. He made his debut at home in a win over Derry City on the 29th but Rovers struggled and midway through the season manager Ray Treacy was sacked so after a total of 13 appearances Dully to move to Bohemians, where he scored on his League debut against Dundalk. Having played 11 League matches for Rovers, scoring 3 goals, that season, he went on to notch up 11 more with the Dalymount Park outfit.

Padraig was loaned out to Crusaders midway through the 96–97 season, and scored his only goal for the club in the 1996–97 Irish League Cup Final against Glentoran, in a game which finished 1–0. He was expected to make his move to the Crues permanent, but then joined Longford Town on loan. Longford were keen to sign Dully on a permanent basis but couldn't afford to and as a result, he was snapped up by Waterford United manager Tommy Lynch.

After Aaron Callaghan resigned as Athlone Town manager in May 2004 Dully stepped in as caretaker manager.

The following season Dully was assistant manager at Athlone Town to Stephen Kelly. When Kelly stepped down in July 2005, Dully resigned too.

== Honours ==
Shelbourne

- League of Ireland Premier Division
  - 1991–92
- FAI Cup
  - 1993

Athlone Town

- League of Ireland First Division
  - 1987–88
- Leinster Senior Cup
  - 1987–88
