= 1992–93 UEFA Champions League first round =

European football contest

The 1992–93 UEFA Champions League first round was the first stage of the competition proper of the 1992–93 UEFA Champions League, and featured 32 teams. It began on 16 September and ended on 9 October 1992. The 16 winners advanced to the second round.

Times are CET/CEST, (Note: CEST (UTC+2) for dates up to 26 September 1992 (first legs), and CET (UTC+1) for dates thereafter (second legs and play-off).) as listed by UEFA.

== Teams ==
In total, 32 teams participated in the first round: 28 teams which entered in this round, and 4 winners of the preliminary round.

Key to colours
Winners of first round advanced to second round

First round participants

Team	Notes	Coeff.
(Spain) Barcelona		2.974
(France) Marseille		3.116
(Italy) Milan		3.052
(Germany) VfB Stuttgart		2.710
(Belgium) Club Brugge		2.594
(Portugal) Porto		2.476
(Netherlands) PSV Eindhoven		2.412
(Poland) Lech Poznań		2.339

Team	Coeff.
(Romania) Dinamo București	2.323
(Scotland) Rangers	2.287
(Russia) CSKA Moscow	2.116
(Sweden) IFK Göteborg	2.080
Austria Wien	2.029
(Switzerland) Sion	1.993
(Greece) AEK Athens	1.974
(Czechoslovakia) Slovan Bratislava	1.777

Team	Coeff.
(Bulgaria) CSKA Sofia	1.687
(Hungary) Ferencváros	1.618
(Denmark) Lyngby	1.431
(Turkey) Beşiktaş	1.375
(England) Leeds United	1.371
(Finland) Kuusysi	1.160
(Northern Ireland) Glentoran	0.833
(Lithuania) Žalgiris	0.666

Team	Notes	Coeff.
(Iceland) Víkingur Reykjavík		0.468
(Norway) Viking		0.433
(Cyprus) APOEL		0.352
Union Luxembourg		0.291
(Israel) Maccabi Tel Aviv		0.000
(Slovenia) Olimpija Ljubljana		0.000
(Latvia) Skonto		0.000
(Ukraine) Tavriya Simferopol		0.000

Notes

1. ^{TH} Title holders
2. ^{PR} Winners from the preliminary round

== Format ==
Each tie was played over two legs, with each team playing one leg at home. The team that scored more goals on aggregate over the two legs advanced to the next round. If the aggregate score was level, the away goals rule was applied, i.e. the team that scored more goals away from home over the two legs advanced. If away goals were also equal, then extra time was played. The away goals rule would be again applied after extra time, i.e. if there were goals scored during extra time and the aggregate score was still level, the visiting team advanced by virtue of more away goals scored. If no goals were scored during extra time, the tie was decided by penalty shoot-out.

== Seeding ==
The draw for the first round was held on 15 July 1992 in Geneva, Switzerland. The 32 teams were divided into a seeded and unseeded pot, each containing 16 teams, for the draw.

Seeded		Unseeded	
(Spain) Barcelona; (France) Marseille; (Italy) Milan; (Germany) VfB Stuttgart; (Belgium) Club Brugge; (Portugal) Porto; (Netherlands) PSV Eindhoven; (Poland) Lech Poznań	(Romania) Dinamo București; (Scotland) Rangers; (Russia) CSKA Moscow; (Sweden) IFK Göteborg; Austria Wien; (Switzerland) Sion; (Greece) AEK Athens; (Czechoslovakia) Slovan Bratislava	(Bulgaria) CSKA Sofia; (Hungary) Ferencváros; (Denmark) Lyngby; (Turkey) Beşiktaş; (England) Leeds United; (Finland) Kuusysi; (Northern Ireland) Glentoran; (Lithuania) Žalgiris	(Iceland) Víkingur Reykjavík; (Norway) Viking; (Cyprus) APOEL; Union Luxembourg; (Israel) Maccabi Tel Aviv; (Slovenia) Olimpija Ljubljana; (Latvia) Skonto; (Ukraine) Tavriya Simferopol

Notes

1. ^{‡} Winners of the preliminary round, whose identity was not known at the time of draw.

== Summary ==
The first legs were played on 16 September, and the second legs on 30 September 1992. An additional play-off was held on 9 October.

Team 1	Agg.	Team 2	1st leg	2nd leg	Play-off
IFK Göteborg (Sweden)	3–2	(Turkey) Beşiktaş	2–0	1–2	
Lech Poznań (Poland)	2–0	(Latvia) Skonto	2–0	0–0	
Rangers (Scotland)	3–0	(Denmark) Lyngby	2–0	1–0	
VfB Stuttgart (Germany)	4–5 (Note: The second leg originally finished as a 4–1 win for Leeds United (thus 4–4 on aggregate, with VfB Stuttgart winning on away goals). The match was later awarded as a 3–0 victory for Leeds due to Stuttgart's illegal use of foreign players, resulting in a 3–3 aggregate score and a play-off being ordered to determine the winner.)	(England) Leeds United	3–0	0–3	1–2
Slovan Bratislava (Czechoslovakia)	4–1	(Hungary) Ferencváros	4–1	0–0	
Milan (Italy)	7–0	(Slovenia) Olimpija Ljubljana	4–0	3–0	
Kuusysi (Finland)	1–2	(Romania) Dinamo București	1–0	0–2 (a.e.t.)	
Glentoran (Northern Ireland)	0–8	(France) Marseille	0–5	0–3	
Maccabi Tel Aviv (Israel)	0–4	(Belgium) Club Brugge	0–1	0–3	
Austria Wien	5–4	(Bulgaria) CSKA Sofia	3–1	2–3	
Sion (Switzerland)	7–2	(Ukraine) Tavriya Simferopol	4–1	3–1	
Union Luxembourg	1–9	(Portugal) Porto	1–4	0–5	
AEK Athens (Greece)	3–3 (a)	(Cyprus) APOEL	1–1	2–2	
PSV Eindhoven (Netherlands)	8–0	(Lithuania) Žalgiris	6–0	2–0	
Víkingur Reykjavík (Iceland)	2–5	(Russia) CSKA Moscow	0–1	2–4	
Barcelona (Spain)	1–0	(Norway) Viking	1–0	0–0	

== Matches ==
16 September 1992
18:00

IFK Göteborg (Sweden)	2–0	(Turkey) Beşiktaş
Eskelinen 72'; Ekström 82'	Report

Ullevi, Gothenburg
Attendance: 5,923
Referee: Leslie Irvine (Northern Ireland)
30 September 1992
21:00

Beşiktaş (Turkey)	2–1	(Sweden) IFK Göteborg
Tekin 26'; Uçar 73'	Report	Eskelinen 10'

BJK İnönü Stadium, Istanbul
Attendance: 31,462
Referee: Angelo Amendolia (Italy)

IFK Göteborg won 3–2 on aggregate.

16 September 1992
18:00

Lech Poznań (Poland)	2–0	(Latvia) Skonto
Trzeciak 26'; Podbrożny 41' (pen.)	Report

Stadion Miejski, Poznań
Attendance: 8,703
Referee: Mitko Mitrev (Bulgaria)
30 September 1992
17:30

Skonto (Latvia)	0–0	(Poland) Lech Poznań
	Report

Daugava Stadium, Riga
Attendance: 3,500
Referee: Frederick McKnight (Northern Ireland)

Lech Poznań won 2–0 on aggregate.

16 September 1992
20:30

Rangers (Scotland)	2–0	(Denmark) Lyngby
Hateley 39'; Huistra 67'	Report

Ibrox Park, Glasgow
Attendance: 40,036
Referee: Jaap Uilenberg (Netherlands)
30 September 1992
19:00

Lyngby (Denmark)	0–1	(Scotland) Rangers
	Report	Durrant 85'

Lyngby Stadion, Kongens Lyngby
Attendance: 4,273
Referee: Karl-Josef Assenmacher (Germany)

Rangers won 3–0 on aggregate.

16 September 1992
20:15

VfB Stuttgart (Germany)	3–0	(England) Leeds United
Walter 62', 66'; Buck 79'	Report

Neckarstadion, Stuttgart
Attendance: 30,500
Referee: Rune Larsson (Sweden)
30 September 1992
20:05

Leeds United (England)	3–0 Awarded (Note: The Leeds United v VfB Stuttgart second-leg match originally finished as a 4–1 win for Leeds United, with VfB Stuttgart deemed to have won the tie on away goals after finishing 4–4 on aggregate. However, after the second leg it was discovered that VfB Stuttgart had fielded more than the allowed maximum of three foreign players, resulting in the match being awarded as a 3–0 win for Leeds United. As a result, the tie finished 3–3 on aggregate and level on away goals, resulting in a play-off match being ordered at a neutral venue to decide the winner.)	(Germany) VfB Stuttgart
Speed 17'; McAllister 38' (pen.); Cantona 66'; Chapman 78'	Report	Buck 33'

Elland Road, Leeds
Attendance: 24,457
Referee: Kim Milton Nielsen (Denmark)

3–3 on aggregate; a play-off was played on a neutral ground to determine the winner.

9 October 1992
20:15

VfB Stuttgart (Germany)	1–2	(England) Leeds United
Golke 38'	Report	Strachan 32'; Shutt 77'

Estadi del Futbol Club Barcelona, Barcelona
Attendance: 8,000
Referee: Fabio Baldas (Italy)

Leeds United won 5–4 on aggregate.

16 September 1992
17:00

Slovan Bratislava (Czechoslovakia)	4–1	(Hungary) Ferencváros
Gostič 19'; Dubovský 51', 55'; Moravec 82'	Report	Lipcsei 75'

Tehelné pole, Bratislava
Attendance: 23,121
Referee: Serge Muhmenthaler (Switzerland)
30 September 1992
19:00

Ferencváros (Hungary)	0–0	(Czechoslovakia) Slovan Bratislava
	Report

Üllői úti Stadion, Budapest
Attendance: 17,000
Referee: Sergei Khusainov (Russia)

Slovan Bratislava won 4–1 on aggregate.

16 September 1992
20:30

Milan (Italy)	4–0	(Slovenia) Olimpija Ljubljana
van Basten 5', 50'; Albertini 7'; Papin 65'	Report

Stadio Giuseppe Meazza, Milan
Attendance: 14,324
Referee: Roman Steindl (Austria)
30 September 1992
20:30

Olimpija Ljubljana (Slovenia)	0–3	(Italy) Milan
	Report	Massaro 31'; Rijkaard 48'; Tassotti 85'

Bežigrad Stadium, Ljubljana
Attendance: 11,725
Referee: Jiří Ulrich (Czechoslovakia)

Milan won 7–0 on aggregate.

16 September 1992
18:00

Kuusysi (Finland)	1–0	(Romania) Dinamo București
Rinne 16'	Report

Lahden kisapuisto, Lahti
Attendance: 1,330
Referee: Wilfred Wallace (Republic of Ireland)
30 September 1992
15:30

Dinamo București (Romania)	2–0 (a.e.t.)	(Finland) Kuusysi
Gerstenmájer 63'; Demollari 116'	Report

Stadionul Dinamo, Bucharest
Attendance: 9,000
Referee: Stavros Zakestidis (Greece)

Dinamo București won 2–1 on aggregate.

16 September 1992
20:30

Glentoran (Northern Ireland)	0–5	(France) Marseille
	Report	Völler 4'; Martín Vázquez 21', 30'; Sauzée 42'; Ferreri 84'

The Oval, Belfast
Attendance: 9,500
Referee: Hans Reijgwart (Netherlands)
30 September 1992
19:00

Marseille (France)	3–0	(Northern Ireland) Glentoran
Omam-Biyik 6'; Pelé 12'; Boli 72'	Report

Stade Vélodrome, Marseille
Attendance: 7,052
Referee: Fortunato Azevedo (Portugal)

Marseille won 8–0 on aggregate.

16 September 1992
16:00

Maccabi Tel Aviv (Israel)	0–1	(Belgium) Club Brugge
	Report	Staelens 35'

Ramat Gan Stadium, Ramat Gan
Attendance: 12,000
Referee: László Vágner (Hungary)
30 September 1992
20:30

Club Brugge (Belgium)	3–0	(Israel) Maccabi Tel Aviv
Staelens 56'; Verheyen 76', 83'	Report

Stade Vélodrome de Rocourt, Liège
Attendance: 4,462
Referee: Rémi Harrel (France)

Club Brugge won 4–0 on aggregate.

16 September 1992
19:30

Austria Wien	3–1	(Bulgaria) CSKA Sofia
Hasenhüttl 16'; Fridrikas 82'; Kogler 90'	Report	Shishkov 58'

Praterstadion, Vienna
Attendance: 6,500
Referee: Ion Crăciunescu (Romania)
30 September 1992
19:15

CSKA Sofia (Bulgaria)	3–2	Austria Wien
Metkov 2'; Andonov 60'; Draganov 73' (pen.)	Report	Flögel 28'; Ivanauskas 67'

Stadion Balgarska Armia, Sofia
Attendance: 8,500
Referee: David Elleray (England)

Austria Wien won 5–4 on aggregate.

16 September 1992
20:00

Sion (Switzerland)	4–1	(Ukraine) Tavriya Simferopol
Hottiger 17'; Túlio 35', 73'; Assis 77'	Report	Shevchenko 85' (pen.)

Stade de Tourbillon, Sion
Attendance: 6,000
Referee: Léon Schelings (Belgium)
30 September 1992
19:00

Tavriya Simferopol (Ukraine)	1–3	(Switzerland) Sion
Shevchenko 69' (pen.)	Report	Túlio 67', 77'; Herr 89'

Lokomotiv Stadium, Simferopol
Attendance: 9,400
Referee: Christer Fällström (Sweden)

Sion won 7–2 on aggregate.

16 September 1992
20:30

Union Luxembourg	1–4	(Portugal) Porto
Deville 63'	Report	Semedo 41'; F. Couto 47'; Toni 51'; Domingos 90'

Stade Achille Hammerel, Luxembourg City
Attendance: 3,552
Referee: Patrick Kelly (Republic of Ireland)
30 September 1992
21:30

Porto (Portugal)	5–0	Union Luxembourg
Kostadinov 16', 35'; Toni 26', 61'; Zé Carlos 67'	Report

Estádio das Antas, Porto
Attendance: 8,500
Referee: Eyjólfur Ólafsson (Iceland)

Porto won 9–1 on aggregate.

16 September 1992
18:00

AEK Athens (Greece)	1–1	(Cyprus) APOEL
Alexandris 41'	Report	Chatziloukas 75'

Nikos Goumas Stadium, Nea Filadelfeia
Attendance: 28,000
Referee: Arie Frost (Israel)
30 September 1992
19:30

APOEL (Cyprus)	2–2	(Greece) AEK Athens
Gogić 77'; Fasouliotis 84'	Report	Šabanadžović 30'; Dimitriadis 70'

Makario Stadium, Nicosia
Attendance: 7,200
Referee: Charles Agius (Malta)

3–3 on aggregate; AEK Athens won on away goals.

16 September 1992
20:15

PSV Eindhoven (Netherlands)	6–0	(Lithuania) Žalgiris
Koeman 24'; Ellerman 36', 60', 64'; Kieft 66'; Numan 80'	Report

Philips Stadion, Eindhoven
Attendance: 15,650
Referee: Jim McCluskey (Scotland)
30 September 1992
18:45

Žalgiris (Lithuania)	0–2	(Netherlands) PSV Eindhoven
	Report	Numan 26'; Romário 39'

Žalgiris Stadium, Vilnius
Attendance: 2,800
Referee: Markus Merk (Germany)

PSV Eindhoven won 8–0 on aggregate.

16 September 1992
19:30

Víkingur Reykjavík (Iceland)	0–1	(Russia) CSKA Moscow
	Report	Karsakov 75'

Laugardalsvöllur, Reykjavík
Attendance: 2,900
Referee: Gerald Ashby (England)
30 September 1992
19:00

CSKA Moscow (Russia)	4–2	(Iceland) Víkingur Reykjavík
Sergeyev 21'; Karsakov 34'; Grishin 44'; Kolesnikov 87'	Report	Einarsson 30'; Steinsson 73'

Grigory Fedotov Stadium, Moscow
Attendance: 10,000
Referee: Erman Toroğlu (Turkey)

CSKA Moscow won 5–2 on aggregate.

16 September 1992
20:45

Barcelona (Spain)	1–0	(Norway) Viking
Amor 87'	Report

Estadi del Futbol Club Barcelona, Barcelona
Attendance: 35,000
Referee: Lajos Hartmann (Hungary)
30 September 1992
20:30

Viking (Norway)	0–0	(Spain) Barcelona
	Report

Stavanger Stadion, Stavanger
Attendance: 12,041
Referee: Simo Ruokonen (Finland)

Barcelona won 1–0 on aggregate.
