= Patrik Bengtsson =

Swedish footballer (born 1971)

Personal information
- Date of birth: 9 March 1971 (age 55)
- Place of birth: Falkenberg, Sweden
- Height: 1.73 m (5 ft 8 in)
- Position: Midfielder

Youth career
- IF Böljan

Senior career*
| Years | Team | Apps | (Gls) |
| 1991–1995 | IFK Göteborg | 30 | (3) |
| 1995–1996 | Västra Frölunda IF | 14 | (4) |
| 1997–2000 | Falkenbergs FF | | |
| 2000–2001 | Herfølge BK | 6 | (0) |
- * Club domestic league appearances and goals

Patrik Bengtsson (born 9 March 1971) is a Swedish former professional footballer who played as a midfielder. (Note: Patrik Bengtsson at WorldFootball.net)
