= Aristos Aristokleous =

Cypriot footballer (born 1974)

Personal information
- Full name: Aristos Aristokleous
- Date of birth: February 28, 1974 (age 52)
- Place of birth: Nicosia, Cyprus
- Height: 1.75 m (5 ft 9 in)
- Position: Defender

Senior career*
Years	Team	Apps	(Gls)
1990–2000	APOEL	199	(11)
2000–2002	Olympiakos Nicosia	40	(0)
2002–2004	AEK Larnaca	24	(1)
2004–2006	ENTHOI Lakatamia	13	(0)
Total		253	(10)

International career
1996–2000	Cyprus	18	(0)
- * Club domestic league appearances and goals

Aristos Aristokleous (Greek: 'Αριστος Αριστοκλέους; born February 28, 1974) is a Cypriot former international football defender.

He started his career in 1990 with APOEL and he spent most of his career with APOEL where he played for eleven years. Then, he joined another team of Nicosia, Olympiakos for two years. Also, he played for AEK Larnaca for another two years and finally finished his career by playing for two seasons for ENTHOI Lakatamia.

== Honours ==
AEK Larnaca

- Cypriot Cup: 2003–04
