= 1995–96 UEFA Champions League qualifying round =

European football tournament

The 1995–96 UEFA Champions League featured 24 teams, with eight teams (the league champions from the seven top-ranked nations in the UEFA country coefficient table, plus the defending champions from 1994–95) qualifying automatically for the group stage and the remaining 16 (the league champions of the nations ranked 8–23 in the country coefficient table) playing in a two-legged preliminary round. The winners of each tie entered the Champions League group stage

Dynamo Kyiv won their tie against AaB, but, in their first group game against Panathinaikos, they were accused of a failed attempt to bribe referee Antonio López Nieto to get a win. Despite an appeal, they were thrown out of the competition by UEFA and were banned for the subsequent two years. AaB replaced them in the group stage. Dynamo's ban was eventually reduced to just one season.

== Teams ==
The sixteen lowest-ranked associations with teams that qualified for the Champions League entered the qualifying round.

Key to colours
Winners of qualifying round advanced to group stage

Qualifying round participants
Assoc.	Team
8	(Belgium) Anderlecht
10	(Turkey) Beşiktaş
11	(Austria) Casino Salzburg
13	(Greece) Panathinaikos
14	(Denmark) AaB
15	(Sweden) IFK Göteborg
16	(Scotland) Rangers
17	(Switzerland) Grasshopper
18	(Poland) Legia Warsaw
19	(Romania) Steaua București
20	(Norway) Rosenborg
21	(Israel) Maccabi Tel Aviv
22	(Hungary) Ferencváros
23	(Croatia) Hajduk Split
24	(Cyprus) Anorthosis Famagusta
25	(Ukraine) Dynamo Kyiv

== Seeding ==
The sixteen teams were divided into seeded and unseeded pots, each containing eight teams, for the draw based on their association's ranking.

Seeded	Unseeded
(Belgium) Anderlecht; (Turkey) Beşiktaş; (Austria) Casino Salzburg; (Greece) Panathinaikos; (Denmark) AaB; (Sweden) IFK Göteborg; (Scotland) Rangers; (Switzerland) Grasshopper	(Poland) Legia Warsaw; (Romania) Steaua București; (Norway) Rosenborg; (Israel) Maccabi Tel Aviv; (Hungary) Ferencváros; (Croatia) Hajduk Split; (Cyprus) Anorthosis Famagusta; (Ukraine) Dynamo Kyiv

== Summary ==
Dynamo Kyiv won their tie against AaB, but, in their first group game against Panathinaikos, they were accused of a failed attempt to bribe the referee, Antonio López Nieto, to get a win. Despite an appeal, they were ejected from the competition and banned for two years, with AaB replacing them in the group stage. Dynamo's ban was eventually reduced to one season.

Team 1	Agg.	Team 2	1st leg	2nd leg
Grasshopper (Switzerland)	2–1	(Israel) Maccabi Tel Aviv	1–1	1–0
Rangers (Scotland)	1–0	(Cyprus) Anorthosis Famagusta	1–0	0–0
Legia Warsaw (Poland)	3–1	(Sweden) IFK Göteborg	1–0	2–1
Casino Salzburg (Austria)	0–1	(Romania) Steaua București	0–0	0–1
Dynamo Kyiv (Ukraine)	4–1	(Denmark) AaB	1–0	3–1
Rosenborg (Norway)	4–3	(Turkey) Beşiktaş	3–0	1–3
Anderlecht (Belgium)	1–2	(Hungary) Ferencváros	0–1	1–1
Panathinaikos (Greece)	1–1 (a)	(Croatia) Hajduk Split	0–0	1–1

== Matches ==
9 August 1995
20:15

Grasshopper (Switzerland)	1–1	(Israel) Maccabi Tel Aviv
Ibrahim 49'	Report	Kashentsev 54'

Hardturm, Zurich
Attendance: 11,200
Referee: Juan Ansuátegui Roca (Spain)
23 August 1995
18:00

Maccabi Tel Aviv (Israel)	0–1	(Switzerland) Grasshopper
	Report	Comisetti 4'

Bloomfield Stadium, Tel Aviv
Attendance: 15,432
Referee: Marcello Nicchi (Italy)

Grasshopper won 2–1 on aggregate.

9 August 1995
20:00

Rangers (Scotland)	1–0	(Cyprus) Anorthosis Famagusta
Durie 68'	Report

Ibrox Park, Glasgow
Attendance: 43,519
Referee: Éric Blareau (Belgium)
23 August 1995
20:00

Anorthosis Famagusta (Cyprus)	0–0	(Scotland) Rangers
	Report

Antonis Papadopoulos Stadium, Larnaca
Attendance: 9,400
Referee: László Vágner (Hungary)

Rangers won 1–0 on aggregate.

9 August 1995
20:15

Legia Warsaw (Poland)	1–0	(Sweden) IFK Göteborg
Podbrożny 49' (pen.)	Report

Polish Army Stadium, Warsaw
Attendance: 10,000
Referee: Jaap Uilenberg (Netherlands)
23 August 1995
19:00

IFK Göteborg (Sweden)	1–2	(Poland) Legia Warsaw
Blomqvist 25'	Report	Pisz 72'; Wieszczycki 90'

Gamla Ullevi, Gothenburg
Attendance: 11,017
Referee: David Elleray (England)

Legia Warsaw won 3–1 on aggregate.

9 August 1995
19:05

Casino Salzburg (Austria)	0–0	(Romania) Steaua București
	Report

Lehener Stadion, Salzburg
Attendance: 8,500
Referee: Anders Frisk (Sweden)
23 August 1995
19:15

Steaua București (Romania)	1–0	(Austria) Casino Salzburg
A. Ilie 33'	Report

Stadionul Steaua, Bucharest
Attendance: 19,987
Referee: Jorge Coroado (Portugal)

Steaua București won 1–0 on aggregate.

9 August 1995
19:00

Dynamo Kyiv (Ukraine)	1–0	(Denmark) AaB
Pokhlebayev 81' (pen.)	Report

Republican Stadium, Kyiv
Attendance: 61,000
Referee: Jiří Ulrich (Czech Republic)
23 August 1995
20:00

AaB (Denmark)	1–3	(Ukraine) Dynamo Kyiv
P. Rasmussen 87'	Report	Kalitvintsev 36'; Shevchenko 49', 77'

Aalborg Stadion, Aalborg
Attendance: 13,200
Referee: Atanas Uzunov (Bulgaria)

Dynamo Kyiv won 4–1 on aggregate.

9 August 1995
20:00

Rosenborg (Norway)	3–0	(Turkey) Beşiktaş
Hoftun 23'; Strand 27'; Brattbakk 75'	Report

Lerkendal Stadion, Trondheim
Attendance: 14,083
Referee: Hermann Albrecht (Germany)
23 August 1995
20:00

Beşiktaş (Turkey)	3–1	(Norway) Rosenborg
Özdilek 9'; Kuntz 85' (pen.), 87'	Report	Brattbakk 67'

BJK İnönü Stadium, Istanbul
Attendance: 23,882
Referee: Marc Batta (France)

Rosenborg won 4–3 on aggregate.

9 August 1995
20:00

Anderlecht (Belgium)	0–1	(Hungary) Ferencváros
	Report	Kuntić 58'

Stade Constant Vanden Stock, Brussels
Attendance: 15,036
Referee: Hellmut Krug (Germany)
23 August 1995
18:00

Ferencváros (Hungary)	1–1	(Belgium) Anderlecht
Kopunović 50'	Report	De Bilde 70'

Üllői úti Stadion, Budapest
Attendance: 16,737
Referee: Leslie Mottram (Scotland)

Ferencváros won 2–1 on aggregate.

9 August 1995
21:15

Panathinaikos (Greece)	0–0	(Croatia) Hajduk Split
	Report

O.A.K.A., Athens
Attendance: 0
Referee: Urs Meier (Switzerland)
23 August 1995
20:30

Hajduk Split (Croatia)	1–1	(Greece) Panathinaikos
Štimac 5'	Report	Borrelli 54'

Stadion Kantrida, Rijeka
Attendance: 10,800
Referee: Ion Crăciunescu (Romania)

1–1 on aggregate; Panathinaikos won on away goals.
