= Christian Lundström =

Swedish footballer (born 1977)

Personal information
- Full name: Bo Christian Lundström
- Date of birth: 31 March 1977 (age 49)
- Place of birth: Söderhamn, Sweden
- Height: 1.83 m (6 ft 0 in)
- Position: Forward

Youth career
- IFK Göteborg

Senior career*
Years	Team	Apps	(Gls)
1994–1997	IFK Göteborg	0	(0)
1998–2000	Västra Frölunda IF	63	(15)
2001	IF Elfsborg	16	(2)
2002–2003	Halmstads BK		

Managerial career
- 2005–2007: Västra Frölunda IF
- 2007–2021: BK Häcken (assistant)
- * Club domestic league appearances and goals

Bo Christian Lundström (born 31 March 1977) is a Swedish professional football manager and former player who currently works as director of football for women's football Damallsvenskan club BK Häcken FF.

== Playing career ==
Lundström started his football career at IFK Göteborg. On 10 December 1997, he made his professional debut for the club, replacing Johnny Ekström in the 72nd minute of a 1–0 UEFA Champions League victory against Bayern Munich. He then had stints with Allsvenskan club Västra Frölunda IF, IF Elfsborg, and Halmstads BK, before retiring from football at age 24 after suffering polymyositis, a chronic inflammation of the muscles.

== Coaching career ==
After ending his playing career, Lundström worked as youth coach for Västra Frölunda IF, before managing the first team from 2005 to 2007. He was then appointed assistant manager at BK Häcken, and held that position for 14 years, between 2007 and 2021. In 2021, he was appointed director of football for Damallsvenskan club BK Häcken FF.
