= Anders Nielsen (footballer, born 1970) =

Danish footballer (born 1970)

Personal information
- Date of birth: 6 December 1970 (age 55)
- Place of birth: Nakskov, Denmark
- Height: 1.84 m (6 ft 0 in)
- Position: Forward

Youth career
- 1986–1990: Købelev IF

Senior career*
| Years | Team | Apps | (Gls) |
| 1989–1991 | Nakskov BK | | |
| 1991–1993 | Helsingør IF | | |
| 1993–1994 | Hellerup IK | | |
| 1994–1996 | Sint Truiden | 55 | (18) |
| 1996–1997 | Club Brugge | 15 | (5) |
| 1997–2002 | Gent | 103 | (29) |
| 2001 | → AC Omonia (loan) | 10 | (2) |
| 2002 | → AGF (loan) | 10 | (2) |
| 2002–2003 | Antwerp | 28 | (1) |
| 2003–2004 | Heusden-Zolder | | |
| 2004–2005 | Red Star Waasland | | |
| 2005–2007 | JV De Pinte | | |

Managerial career
- 2009–2011: OB (youth)
- 2011–2015: Marienlyst
- 2016–2017: Vejle Boldklub (youth)
- 2017–2019: Dalum
- 2019–2020: Otterup B&IK
- 2021–2022: Antwerp (assistant)
- * Club domestic league appearances and goals

Anders Nielsen (born 6 December 1970) is a Danish former footballer who played as a forward. He has played for a number of clubs in Belgian football. He was most recently assistant manager of Antwerp.

== Club career ==
He started his career as an amateur with Denmark Series club Nakskov BK and Danish 2nd Division teams Helsingør IF and Hellerup IK.

=== Belgium ===
In 1994, he moved abroad to play professionally for K. Sint-Truidense V.V., Club Brugge K.V., K.A.A. Gent, Royal Antwerp FC, K. Beringen-Heusden-Zolder, K.V. Red Star Waasland, and JV De Pinte in Belgium. While at Gent, he underwent loan deals at AC Omonia, winning the 2000–01 Cypriot First Division championship, and AGF in Denmark.

He ended his active career in 2007.

== International career ==
He played one unofficial national team match in 1996.

== Management career ==
In 2009, he became part-time youth coach at Odense Boldklub. At the same time he started as sales consultant at BK Marienlyst. In 2011, he was named new full-time manager of BK Marienlyst. He stepped down following the 2014-15 season.

In 2015 he took a hiatus from football, but returned in 2016 as youth coach of Vejle Boldklub. In the summer of 2017 he became new manager of Dalum IF in the Danish 2nd Divisions.

== Honours ==
=== Club ===
AC Omonia

- Cypriot First Division: 2000–01
