= Sebastián Calleja =

Argentine footballer (born 1979)

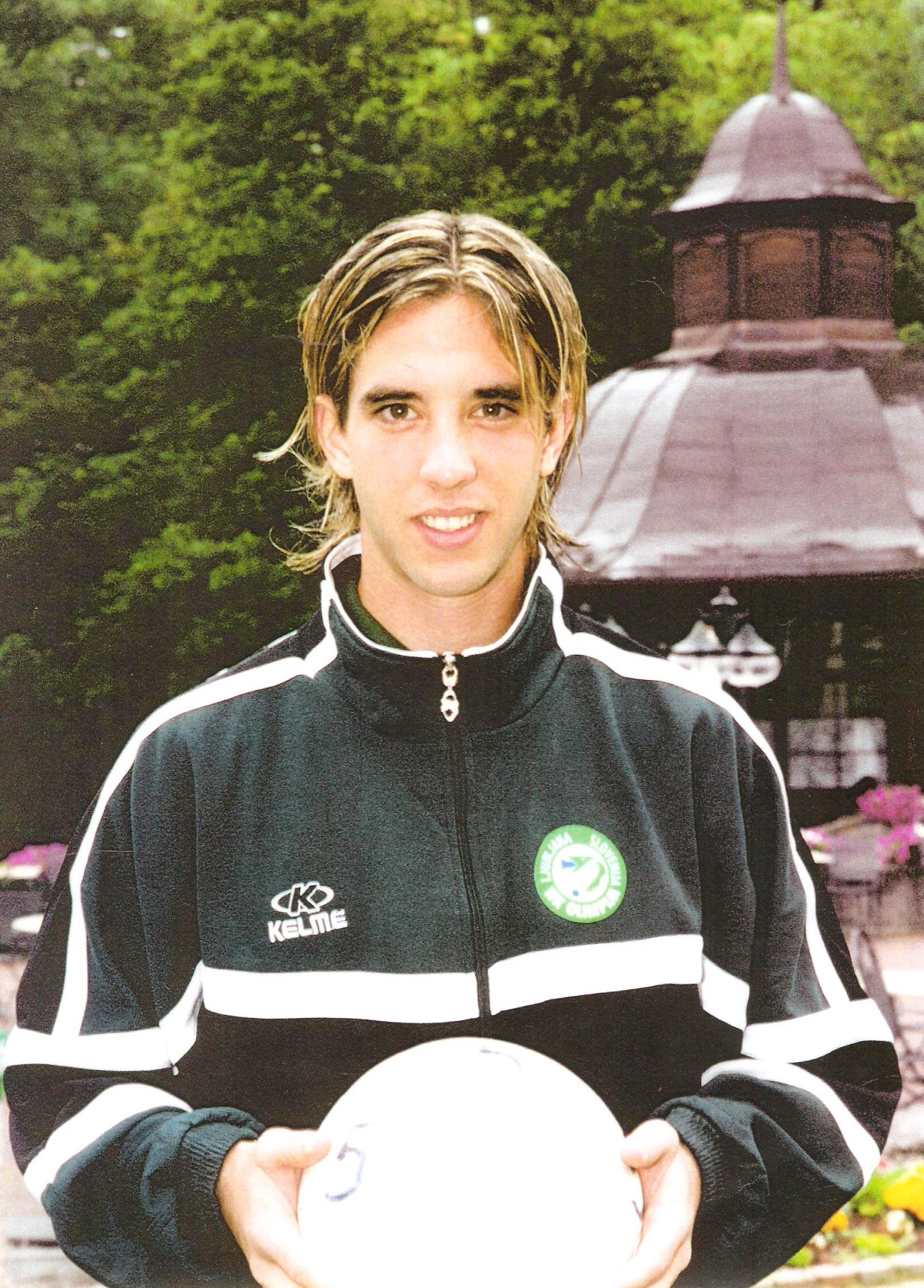
- Sebastián Calleja, when playing for NK Ljubljana

Personal information
- Full name: Sebastián Mariano Calleja
- Date of birth: February 2, 1979 (age 47)
- Place of birth: Buenos Aires, Argentina
- Height: 1.80 m (5 ft 11 in)
- Position: Midfielder

Youth career
- River Plate
- Argentinos Juniors

Senior career*
Years	Team	Apps	(Gls)
1996–1998	Argentinos Juniors		
1999	Mallorca B		
1999	Once Caldas		
2000	Conversano		
2001	Bari		
2001–2002	Olimpija Ljubljana	2	(0)
2003	Once Caldas	2	(0)
2003	Argentinos Juniors	0	(0)
2004	Deportes La Serena	6	(0)
2005	Johor Bahru City		
2007	Hispano FC		
- * Club domestic league appearances and goals

Sebastián Mariano Calleja (born February 2, 1979, in Buenos Aires, Argentina) is a former Argentine footballer who played for clubs of Argentina, Chile, Colombia, Honduras, Spain, Italy, Slovenia and Malaysia. He played as a midfielder.

== Teams ==
- (Argentina) River Plate (youth)
- (Argentina) Argentinos Juniors 1996–1998
- (Spain) Mallorca B 1999
- (Colombia) Once Caldas 1999
- (Italy) Conversano 2000
- (Italy) Bari 2001
- (Slovenia) Olimpija Ljubljana 2001–2002
- (Colombia) Once Caldas 2003
- (Argentina) Argentinos Juniors 2003
- (Chile) Deportes La Serena 2004
- (Malaysia) Johor Bahru City 2005
- (Honduras) Hispano FC 2007

== Titles ==
- (Colombia) Once Caldas 2003 (Torneo Apertura Colombian Primera División Championship), 2004 (Copa Libertadores de América)
