= Giorgi Anchabadze =

Soviet-Georgian footballer

Personal information
- Full name: Giorgi Anchabadze
- Date of birth: 4 January 1973 (age 53)
- Place of birth: Tbilisi, Georgian SSR
- Height: 1.79 m (5 ft 10 in)
- Position: Attacking midfielder

Youth career
- 1990−1991: Shevardeni-1906 Tbilisi

Senior career*
Years	Team	Apps	(Gls)
1991−1992	Shevardeni-1906 Tbilisi	35	(9)
1992−1997	Dinamo Tbilisi	97	(25)
1997−1998	Hapoel Ashkelon	26	(8)
1998	Hapoel Kfar Saba	9	(0)
1999	Mechelen	3	(0)
1999−2000	Dinamo Tbilisi	21	(3)
2001	Locomotive Tbilisi	30	(4)
2002−2004	Dinamo Tbilisi	60	(8)
2004−2005	Enosis Neon Paralimni	10	(2)
- * Club domestic league appearances and goals

Giorgi Anchabadze (Georgian: გიორგი ანჩაბაძე; born 4 January 1973) is a Georgian former footballer.
