= 1992–93 UEFA Champions League =

European football tournament

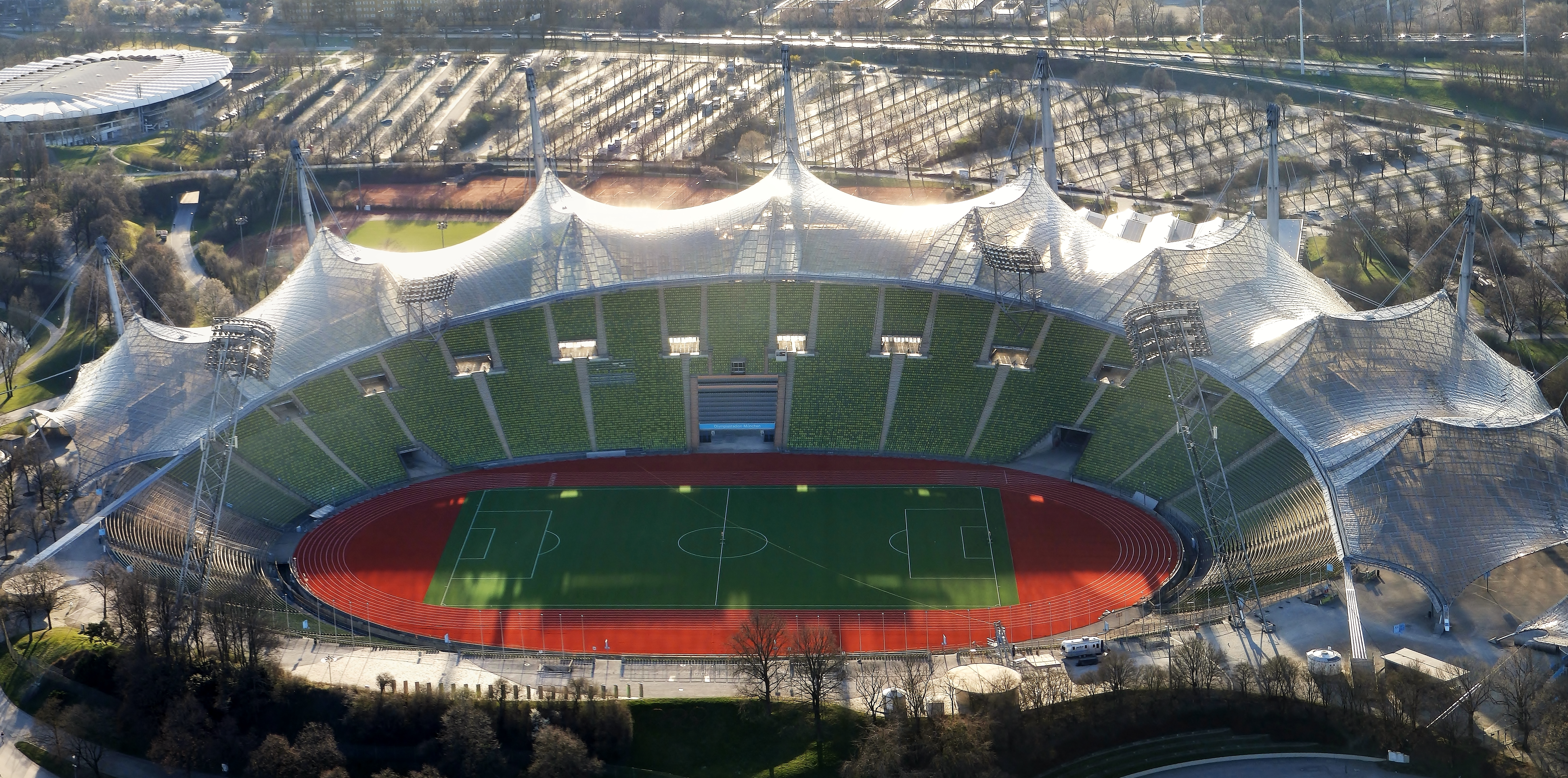
- The final was played at the Olympiastadion in Munich.

Tournament details
- Dates: Qualifying: 19 August – 2 September 1992; Competition proper: 16 September 1992 – 26 May 1993
- Teams: Competition proper: 32; Total: 36

Final positions
- Champions: (France) Marseille (1st title)
- Runners-up: (Italy) AC Milan

Tournament statistics
- Matches played: 74
- Goals scored: 194 (2.62 per match)
- Attendance: 1,896,787 (25,632 per match)
- Top scorer(s): Romário (PSV Eindhoven); 7 goals

The 1992–93 UEFA Champions League, originally known as the 1992–93 European Cup, was the 38th European Cup, the premier European club football tournament, and the first season with the UEFA Champions League branding (originally adopted only in the group stage).

It was the second season of the competition in which the eight second round winners would be split into two groups, with the winner of each one meeting in the final. In addition, a preliminary round was required as this was the first season after the break-up of the Soviet Union and Yugoslavia, resulting in many new countries eligible to enter the champions of their own leagues into the competition. Israel and the Faroe Islands were also represented for the first time.

The tournament was won for the first time by Marseille, defeating Milan in the final, becoming the first French team to win the European Cup/Champions League.

However, soon after Marseille's victory allegations of match fixing were levelled at them and their president Bernard Tapie. This involved a league game that took place 6 days before the final where Marseille, it emerged, had fixed their title-clinching Division 1 game against Valenciennes so they could concentrate on the final against Milan. It is believed that Tapie bribed Valenciennes to lose so that Marseille would win the French league earlier, and above all that they would not injure the Marseille players before the final against Milan. Before the 1991 European Cup final against Red Star Belgrade, Marseille had a few injured players, Tapie did not want to repeat this mistake. This resulted in Marseille being stripped of their league title by the French Football Federation (although not the European Cup, as the match in question was not in that competition). They were banned from defending their European title in the 1993–94 season, and contesting the Intercontinental Cup and Super Cup. During the 1995 trial over Marseille's financial accounts, it was revealed that they had an annual budget of Fr5 million (about €760,000) dedicated to the purchase of matches from 1989 to 1993. UEFA, along with the French Federation and French authorities, investigated several Marseille matches during the 1992–93 season. These investigations have not established any formal proof concerning alleged match-fixing in the Champions League. Therefore, Marseille's status as 1993 European champion was not affected.

Barcelona, the defending champions, were eliminated in the second round by CSKA Moscow.

== Teams ==
In total, 36 national champions participated in 1992–93 UEFA Champions League season. The 8 lowest-ranked champions according to the 1992 club seeding coefficients entered in the preliminary round, while the 28 best-ranked champions entered in the first round.

=== Distribution ===
Round	Teams entering in this round	Teams advancing from the previous round
Preliminary round (8 teams)	8 champions ranked 29–36 by seeding coefficient	
First round (32 teams)	28 champions ranked 1–28 by seeding coefficient (including title holders)	4 winners from the qualifying round
Second round (16 teams)		16 winners from the first round
Group stage (8 teams)		8 winners from the second round
Final (2 teams)		2 group winners from the group stage

Since the title holders (Barcelona) qualified via their domestic league, the title holder spot was vacated and the following changes to the default access list were made:

- The champions ranked 27th and 28th (APOEL and Union Luxembourg) were promoted from the preliminary round to the first round.

=== Ranking ===
Location of teams of the 1992–93 UEFA Champions League.
Purple: Eliminated in the preliminary round; Yellow: Eliminated in the first round; Orange: Eliminated in the second round; Red: Qualified for group stage.

The teams were ranked according to their 1992 UEFA seeding coefficients, which took into account performances in European competitions from 1987–88 to 1991–92. Each club and national association had a seeding coefficient calculated (total points divided by total matches), with both values added together to determine the club's final coefficient. This ranking then determined the round each team would enter.

Qualified teams for 1992–93 UEFA Champions League (by ranking)
Rank	Association	Team	Coeff.
First round
3	Spain	Barcelona (1st)^{TH}	2.974
1	France	Marseille (1st)	3.116
2	Italy	Milan (1st)	3.052
4	Germany	VfB Stuttgart (1st)	2.710
5	Belgium	Club Brugge (1st)	2.594
6	Portugal	Porto (1st)	2.476
7	Netherlands	PSV Eindhoven (1st)	2.412
8	Poland	Lech Poznań (1st)	2.339
9	Romania	Dinamo București (1st)	2.323
10	Scotland	Rangers (1st)	2.287
11	Russia	CSKA Moscow (1st)	2.116
12	Sweden	IFK Göteborg (1st)	2.080
13	Austria	Austria Wien (1st)	2.029
14	Switzerland	Sion (1st)	1.993
15	Greece	AEK Athens (1st)	1.974
16	Czechoslovakia	Slovan Bratislava (1st)	1.777
17	Bulgaria	CSKA Sofia (1st)	1.687
18	Hungary	Ferencváros (1st)	1.618
19	Denmark	Lyngby (1st)	1.431
20	Turkey	Beşiktaş (1st)	1.375
21	England	Leeds United (1st)	1.371
22	Finland	Kuusysi (1st)	1.160
23	Northern Ireland	Glentoran (1st)	0.833
24	Lithuania	Žalgiris (1st)	0.666
25	Iceland	Víkingur Reykjavík (1st)	0.468
26	Norway	Viking (1st)	0.433
27	Cyprus	APOEL (1st)	0.352
28	Luxembourg	Union Luxembourg (1st)	0.291
Preliminary round
29	Republic of Ireland	Shelbourne (1st)	0.269
30	Malta	Valletta (1st)	0.200
31	Faroe Islands	KÍ (1st)	0.000
31	Israel	Maccabi Tel Aviv (1st)	0.000
31	Estonia	Norma Tallinn (1st)	0.000
31	Slovenia	Olimpija Ljubljana (1st)	0.000
31	Latvia	Skonto (1st)	0.000
31	Ukraine	Tavriya Simferopol (1st)	0.000

Associations without a participating team
- Albania
- FR Yugoslavia
- Liechtenstein
- San Marino
- Wales

Notes

1. Albania (ALB): Albanian clubs were excluded from European competitions for the 1992–93 season, after the political situation in Albania collapsed and the national team could not complete the UEFA Euro 1992 qualifying. Vllaznia would have qualified as champions of the 1991–92 Albanian National Championship.
2. FR Yugoslavia (YUG): 1991–92 Yugoslav First League champions Red Star Belgrade were not admitted as a result of UN economic sanctions imposed on Yugoslavia.

== Round and draw dates ==
All draws for the competition were held in Geneva, Switzerland.

Schedule for 1992–93 UEFA Champions League
Phase	Round	Draw date	First leg	Second leg
Preliminary round		15 July 1992	19 August 1992	2 September 1992
First round (Note: An additional play-off match for the first round was held on 9 October 1992.)		15 July 1992	16 September 1992	30 September 1992
Second round		2 October 1992	21 October 1992	4 November 1992
Group stage	Matchday 1	6 November 1992	25 November 1992	
Group stage	Matchday 2	6 November 1992	9 December 1992	
Group stage	Matchday 3	6 November 1992	3 March 1993	
Group stage	Matchday 4	6 November 1992	17 March 1993	
Group stage	Matchday 5	6 November 1992	7 April 1993	
Group stage	Matchday 6	6 November 1992	21 April 1993	
Final		6 November 1992	26 May 1993 at Olympiastadion, Munich	

== Preliminary round ==
The first legs were played on 19 August, and the second legs on 2 September 1992.

Team 1	Agg.	Team 2	1st leg	2nd leg
Shelbourne (Republic of Ireland)	1–2	(Ukraine) Tavriya Simferopol	0–0	1–2
Valletta (Malta)	1–3	(Israel) Maccabi Tel Aviv	1–2	0–1
KÍ (Faroe Islands)	1–6	(Latvia) Skonto	1–3	0–3
Olimpija Ljubljana (Slovenia)	5–0	(Estonia) Norma Tallinn	3–0	2–0

== First round ==
The first legs were played on 16 September, and the second legs on 30 September 1992. An additional play-off was held on 9 October.

Team 1	Agg.	Team 2	1st leg	2nd leg	Play-off
IFK Göteborg (Sweden)	3–2	(Turkey) Beşiktaş	2–0	1–2	
Lech Poznań (Poland)	2–0	(Latvia) Skonto	2–0	0–0	
Rangers (Scotland)	3–0	(Denmark) Lyngby	2–0	1–0	
VfB Stuttgart (Germany)	4–5 (Note: The second leg originally finished as a 4–1 win for Leeds United (thus 4–4 on aggregate, with VfB Stuttgart winning on away goals). The match was later awarded as a 3–0 victory for Leeds due to Stuttgart's illegal use of foreign players, resulting in a 3–3 aggregate score and a play-off being ordered to determine the winner.)	(England) Leeds United	3–0	0–3	1–2
Slovan Bratislava (Czechoslovakia)	4–1	(Hungary) Ferencváros	4–1	0–0	
Milan (Italy)	7–0	(Slovenia) Olimpija Ljubljana	4–0	3–0	
Kuusysi (Finland)	1–2	(Romania) Dinamo București	1–0	0–2 (a.e.t.)	
Glentoran (Northern Ireland)	0–8	(France) Marseille	0–5	0–3	
Maccabi Tel Aviv (Israel)	0–4	(Belgium) Club Brugge	0–1	0–3	
Austria Wien	5–4	(Bulgaria) CSKA Sofia	3–1	2–3	
Sion (Switzerland)	7–2	(Ukraine) Tavriya Simferopol	4–1	3–1	
Union Luxembourg	1–9	(Portugal) Porto	1–4	0–5	
AEK Athens (Greece)	3–3 (a)	(Cyprus) APOEL	1–1	2–2	
PSV Eindhoven (Netherlands)	8–0	(Lithuania) Žalgiris	6–0	2–0	
Víkingur Reykjavík (Iceland)	2–5	(Russia) CSKA Moscow	0–1	2–4	
Barcelona (Spain)	1–0	(Norway) Viking	1–0	0–0	

== Second round ==
The first legs were played on 21 October, and the second legs on 4 November 1992.

Team 1	Agg.	Team 2	1st leg	2nd leg
IFK Göteborg (Sweden)	4–0	(Poland) Lech Poznań	1–0	3–0
Rangers (Scotland)	4–2	(England) Leeds United	2–1	2–1
Slovan Bratislava (Czechoslovakia)	0–5	(Italy) Milan	0–1	0–4
Dinamo București (Romania)	0–2	(France) Marseille	0–0	0–2
Club Brugge (Belgium)	3–3 (a)	Austria Wien	2–0	1–3
Sion (Switzerland)	2–6	(Portugal) Porto	2–2	0–4
AEK Athens (Greece)	1–3	(Netherlands) PSV Eindhoven	1–0	0–3
CSKA Moscow (Russia)	4–3	(Spain) Barcelona	1–1	3–2

== Group stage ==
Location of teams of the 1992–93 UEFA Champions League
Brown: Group A; Red: Group B

The group stage began on 25 November 1992 and ended on 21 April 1993. The eight teams were divided into two groups of four, and the teams in each group played against each other on a home-and-away basis, meaning that each team played a total of six group matches. For each win, teams were awarded two points, with one point awarded for each draw. At the end of the group stage, the first team in each group advanced to the final.

=== Group A ===
Pos	Team	Pld	W	D	L	GF	GA	GD	Pts	Qualification	MAR	RAN	BRU	CSKA
1	(France) Marseille	6	3	3	0	14	4	+10	9	Advance to final	—	1–1	3–0	6–0
2	(Scotland) Rangers	6	2	4	0	7	5	+2	8		2–2	—	2–1	0–0
3	(Belgium) Club Brugge	6	2	1	3	5	8	−3	5		0–1	1–1	—	1–0
4	(Russia) CSKA Moscow	6	0	2	4	2	11	−9	2		1–1	0–1	1–2	—

Source: UEFA

=== Group B ===
Pos	Team	Pld	W	D	L	GF	GA	GD	Pts	Qualification	MIL	GOT	POR	PSV
1	(Italy) Milan	6	6	0	0	11	1	+10	12	Advance to final	—	4–0	1–0	2–0
2	(Sweden) IFK Göteborg	6	3	0	3	7	8	−1	6		0–1	—	1–0	3–0
3	(Portugal) Porto	6	2	1	3	5	5	0	5		0–1	2–0	—	2–2
4	(Netherlands) PSV Eindhoven	6	0	1	5	4	13	−9	1		1–2	1–3	0–1	—

Source: UEFA

== Final ==
The final was played on 26 May 1993 at the Olympiastadion in Munich, Germany.

26 May 1993
20:15 UTC+2

Marseille (France)	1–0	(Italy) Milan
Boli 44'	Report

Olympiastadion, Munich
Attendance: 64,444
Referee: Kurt Röthlisberger (Switzerland)

== Top goalscorers ==
The top scorers from the 1992–93 UEFA Champions League (excluding preliminary round) are as follows:

Rank	Name	Team	Goals
1	(Brazil) Romário	(Netherlands) PSV Eindhoven	7
2	(Netherlands) Marco van Basten	(Italy) Milan	6
2	(France) Franck Sauzée	(France) Marseille	6
2	(Croatia) Alen Bokšić	(France) Marseille	6
5	(Sweden) Johnny Ekström	(Sweden) IFK Göteborg	5
6	(Italy) Marco Simone	(Italy) Milan	4
6	(Belgium) Gert Verheyen	(Belgium) Club Brugge	4
6	(Brazil) Zé Carlos	(Portugal) Porto	4
6	(Bulgaria) Emil Kostadinov	(Portugal) Porto	4
6	(Brazil) Túlio	(Switzerland) Sion	4

== See also ==
- 1992–93 European Cup Winners' Cup
- 1992–93 UEFA Cup
