= 1992–93 Olympique de Marseille season =

Olympique de Marseille
1992–93 season
- President: Bernard Tapie
- Manager: Raymond Goethals
- Stadium: Stade Vélodrome
- French Division 1: 1st (title revoked) (Note: Marseille were stripped of the Division 1 title following the bribery scandal.)
- Coupe de France: Quarter-finals
- UEFA Champions League: Winners
- Top goalscorer: League: Alen Bokšić (23 goals); All: Alen Bokšić (29 goals)
- Average home league attendance: 27,010
Home colours	Away colours

During the 1992–93 French football season, Olympique de Marseille competed in French Division 1.

== Season summary ==
Marseille won French Division 1, and also became the first French club to win the European Cup defeating in the final A.C. Milan 1–0. However, it was later revealed that midfielder Jean-Jacques Eydelie had (on behalf of the Marseille board) bribed Valenciennes players Jorge Burruchaga, Christophe Robert and Jacques Glassman to lose the last match of the season, which Marseille needed to win the secure the French title, so that Marseille could win the match without much exertion ahead of the Champions League final. The scandal saw Marseille stripped of their title, relegated to Division 2 and banned from defending the Champions League or competing in the European Super and Intercontinental Cups, although they were allowed to remain European champions.

== First-team squad ==
Squad at end of season

Note: Flags indicate national team as defined under FIFA eligibility rules; some limited exceptions apply. Players may hold more than one non-FIFA nationality.

No.	Pos.	Nation	Player
1	GK	FRA	Fabien Barthez
2	DF	FRA	Jocelyn Angloma (Note: Angloma was born in Abymes, Guadeloupe, but also qualifies to represent France internationally; he made his international debut for France in 1990 and Guadeloupe in 2006.)
3	DF	FRA	Éric Di Meco
4	DF	FRA	Basile Boli (Note: Boli was born in Abidjan, Côte d'Ivoire, but was raised in France and made his international debut for France in 1986.)
5	MF	FRA	Franck Sauzée
6	DF	FRA	Marcel Desailly (Note: Desailly was born in Accra, Ghana, but also qualified to represent France internationally and made his international debut for France in 1993.)
7	MF	FRA	Jean-Jacques Eydelie
8	FW	CRO	Alen Bokšić
9	FW	GER	Rudi Völler
10	FW	GHA	Abedi Pele
11	MF	FRA	Didier Deschamps (captain)
12	DF	FRA	Manuel Amoros

No.	Pos.	Nation	Player
13	DF	FRA	Bernard Casoni
14	MF	FRA	Jean-Christophe Thomas
15	FW	CMR	François Omam-Biyik
16	GK	FRA	Pascal Olmeta
17	MF	FRA	Jean-Philippe Durand
18	FW	FRA	Marc Libbra
19	FW	FRA	Jean-Marc Ferreri
20	MF	RUS	Igor Dobrovolski
21	MF	FRA	Jean-Christophe Marquet
22	MF	ESP	Rafael Martín Vázquez
23	MF	YUG	Dragan Stojković
24	MF	FRA	Alain Boghossian

== Competitions ==
=== Division 1 ===
==== League table ====
Pos	Team	Pld	W	D	L	GF	GA	GD	Pts	Qualification or relegation
1	Marseille (D)	38	22	10	6	71	36	+35	53 (Note: Marseille and Valenciennes were deducted one point for their involvement in the French football bribery scandal.)	Disqualified from the Champions League (Note: Marseille were stripped of the title and barred from 1993–94 UEFA Champions League due to their involvement in the bribery scandal. Retained league status.)
2	Paris Saint-Germain (N)	38	20	11	7	61	29	+32	51	Qualification to the Cup Winners' Cup first round (Note: Paris Saint-Germain qualified for the 1993–94 European Cup Winners' Cup as winners of the 1992–93 Coupe de France.)
3	Monaco	38	21	9	8	56	29	+27	51	Qualification to the Champions League first round (Note: Monaco qualified for the Champions League as league champions Marseille were disqualified and runners-up Paris Saint-Germain declined to participate.)
4	Bordeaux	38	18	12	8	42	25	+17	48	Qualification to the UEFA Cup first round
5	Nantes	38	17	11	10	54	39	+15	45	Qualification to the UEFA Cup first round

Source: Histoire du PSG
Rules for classification: 1) points; 2) goal difference; 3) number of goals scored.
Victory: 2 points, Draw: 1 point, Defeat: 0 points
(D) Disqualified; (N) Refused title and entry to the UCL

==== Results summary ====
Overall								Home						Away					
Pld	W	D	L	GF	GA	GD	Pts	W	D	L	GF	GA	GD	W	D	L	GF	GA	GD
38	22	10	6	71	36	+35	76	15	3	1	44	14	+30	7	7	5	27	22	+5

Source: Division 1

==== Results by round ====
Round	1	2	3	4	5	6	7	8	9	10	11	12	13	14	15	16	17	18	19	20	21	22	23	24	25	26	27	28	29	30	31	32	33	34	35	36	37	38
Ground	H	A	H	A	H	A	H	A	H	A	H	H	A	H	A	H	A	H	A	H	A	H	A	H	A	H	A	H	A	A	H	A	H	A	H	A	H	A
Result	W	D	W	D	W	W	D	D	W	L	L	W	D	D	D	W	L	W	W	W	L	W	W	W	W	W	L	D	W	W	W	D	W	W	W	W	W	L
Position	6	6	4	5	3	3	3	4	3	4	5	5	4	5	5	5	5	5	4	3	5	4	4	2	2	1	2	2	2	1	1	1	1	1	1	1	1	1

Source: Division 1
A = Away; H = Home; W = Win; D = Draw; L = Loss

=== Coupe de France ===
March 1993 First round	Marseille	3–1	Martigues
	Ferreri 3' 90'; Di Meco 73'	(Report)	Castro 17' (pen.)

March 1993 Second round	Rouen	0–1	Marseille
		(Report)	Völler 81' (pen.)	Attendance: 16,850; Referee: M. Ramos

May 1993 Third round	Caen	1–2	Marseille
	Cauet 84'	(Report)	Völler 17'; Thomas 25'	Attendance: 6,811; Referee: M. Poulain

May 1993 Quarter-finals	Saint-Étienne	2–1 (a.e.t.)	Marseille
	G. Passi 17'; Casoni 105' (o.g.)	(Report)	Moreau 61' (o.g.)	Attendance: 20,009; Referee: M. Lainé

=== UEFA Champions League ===
==== First round ====
16 September 1992 First leg	Glentoran (Northern Ireland)	0–5	(France) Marseille	The Oval, Belfast
19:30		Report	Völler 3'; Martín Vázquez 19', 19'; Sauzée 41'; Ferreri 84'	Referee: Johannes Reijgwart (Netherlands)

30 September 1992 Second leg	Marseille (France)	3–0	(Northern Ireland) Glentoran	Stade Vélodrome, Marseille
19:00	Omam-Biyik 6'; Pele 12'; Boli 72'	Report

==== Second round ====
21 October 1992 First leg	Dinamo București (Romania)	0–0	(France) Marseille	Stadionul Național, Bucharest
18:00		Report		Attendance: 45,000; Referee: Peter Mikkelsen (Denmark)

4 November 1992 Second leg	Marseille (France)	2–0	(Romania) Dinamo București	Stade Vélodrome, Marseille
19:00	Bokšić 32', 68'	Report		Attendance: 25,000; Referee: Arcangelo Pezzella (Italy)

==== Group stage ====
Pos	Team	Pld	W	D	L	GF	GA	GD	Pts	Qualification	MAR	RAN	BRU	CSKA
1	(France) Marseille	6	3	3	0	14	4	+10	9	Advance to final	—	1–1	3–0	6–0
2	(Scotland) Rangers	6	2	4	0	7	5	+2	8		2–2	—	2–1	0–0
3	(Belgium) Club Brugge	6	2	1	3	5	8	−3	5		0–1	1–1	—	1–0
4	(Russia) CSKA Moscow	6	0	2	4	2	11	−9	2		1–1	0–1	1–2	—

Source: UEFA

25 November 1992 1	Rangers (Scotland)	2–2	(France) Marseille	Ibrox Stadium, Glasgow
19:30	McSwegan 76'; Hateley 82'	Report	Bokšić 31'; Völler 55'	Attendance: 41,624; Referee: Sándor Puhl (Hungary)

9 December 1992 2	Marseille (France)	3–0	(Belgium) Club Brugge	Stade Vélodrome, Marseille
20:30	Sauzée 4' (pen.); Bokšić 10', 26'	Report		Attendance: 30,000; Referee: Aron Schmidhuber (Germany)

3 March 1993 3	CSKA Moscow (Russia)	1–1	(France) Marseille	Olympiastadion, Berlin
20:30	Faizulin 55'	Report	Pele 27'	Attendance: 12,500; Referee: Fabio Baldas (Italy)

17 March 1993 4	Marseille (France)	6–0	(Russia) CSKA Moscow	Stade Vélodrome, Marseille
20:30	Sauzée 4' (pen.), 34', 48'; Pele 42'; Ferreri 70'; Desailly 78'	Report		Attendance: 35,000; Referee: Serge Muhmenthaler (Switzerland)

7 April 1993 5	Marseille (France)	1–1	(Scotland) Rangers	Stade Vélodrome, Marseille
20:30	Sauzée 18'	Report	Durrant 52'	Attendance: 46,000; Referee: Mario van der Ende (Netherlands)

21 April 1993 6	Club Brugge (Belgium)	0–1	(France) Marseille	Olympiastadion, Bruges
20:30		Report	Bokšić 2'	Attendance: 17,000; Referee: Ion Crăciunescu (Romania)

==== Final ====
26 May 1993 Final	Marseille (France)	1–0	(Italy) Milan	Olympiastadion, Munich
20:15	Boli 43'	Report		Attendance: 64,400; Referee: Kurt Röthlisberger (Switzerland)

== Statistics ==
=== Appearances and goals ===
As of 1 June 1993

No.	Pos	Nat	Player	Total		Ligue 1		Coupe de France		Champions League	
No.	Pos	Nat	Player	Apps	Goals	Apps	Goals	Apps	Goals	Apps	Goals
Goalkeepers
1	GK	(France) FRA	Fabien Barthez	40	0	30	0	0	0	10	0
16	GK	(France) FRA	Pascal Olmeta	13	0	8	0	4	0	1	0
Defenders
2	DF	(France) FRA	Jocelyn Angloma	42	1	28+3	1	1+1	0	9	0
3	DF	(France) FRA	Éric Di Meco	43	1	28+3	0	3	1	8+1	0
4	DF	(France) FRA	Basile Boli	42	6	32	4	1	0	9	2
6	DF	(France) FRA	Marcel Desailly	44	2	30+1	1	3	0	10	1
12	DF	(France) FRA	Manuel Amoros	18	0	6+6	0	3	0	3	0
13	DF	(France) FRA	Bernard Casoni	34	0	23+1	0	4	0	6	0
Midfielders
5	MF	(France) FRA	Franck Sauzée	47	18	33+2	12	1+1	0	9+1	6
7	MF	(France) FRA	Jean-Jacques Eydelie	40	0	24+3	0	2	0	6+5	0
11	MF	(France) FRA	Didier Deschamps	50	1	36	1	2+1	0	11	0
12	MF	(France) FRA	Jean-Christophe Thomas	26	1	9+8	0	4	1	4+1	0
14	MF	(France) FRA	Jean-Philippe Durand	42	0	19+10	0	4	0	3+6	0
20	MF	(Russia) RUS	Igor Dobrovolski	12	1	5+3	1	2+1	0	1	0
21	MF	(France) FRA	Jean-Christophe Marquet	2	0	0	0	0+1	0	0+1	0
Forwards
8	FW	(Croatia) CRO	Alen Bokšić	46	29	34+3	23	0+1	0	8	6
9	FW	(Germany) GER	Rudi Völler	44	22	32+1	18	3	2	8	2
10	FW	(Ghana) GHA	Abedi Pele	49	9	33+2	6	3	0	11	3
19	FW	(France) FRA	Jean-Marc Ferreri	27	6	3+16	2	4	2	1+3	2
Players loaned or transferred out during the season
15	FW	(Cameroon) CMR	François Omam-Biyik	2	1	1	0	0	0	1	1
22	MF	(Spain) ESP	Rafael Martín Vázquez	9	3	4+3	1	0	0	2	2
