= 1993 UEFA Champions League final =

Association football match

- Match programme cover
- Event: 1992–93 UEFA Champions League
Marseille	Milan
(France)	(Italy)
1	0
- Date: 26 May 1993
- Venue: Olympiastadion, Munich
- Referee: Kurt Röthlisberger (Switzerland)
- Attendance: 64,444

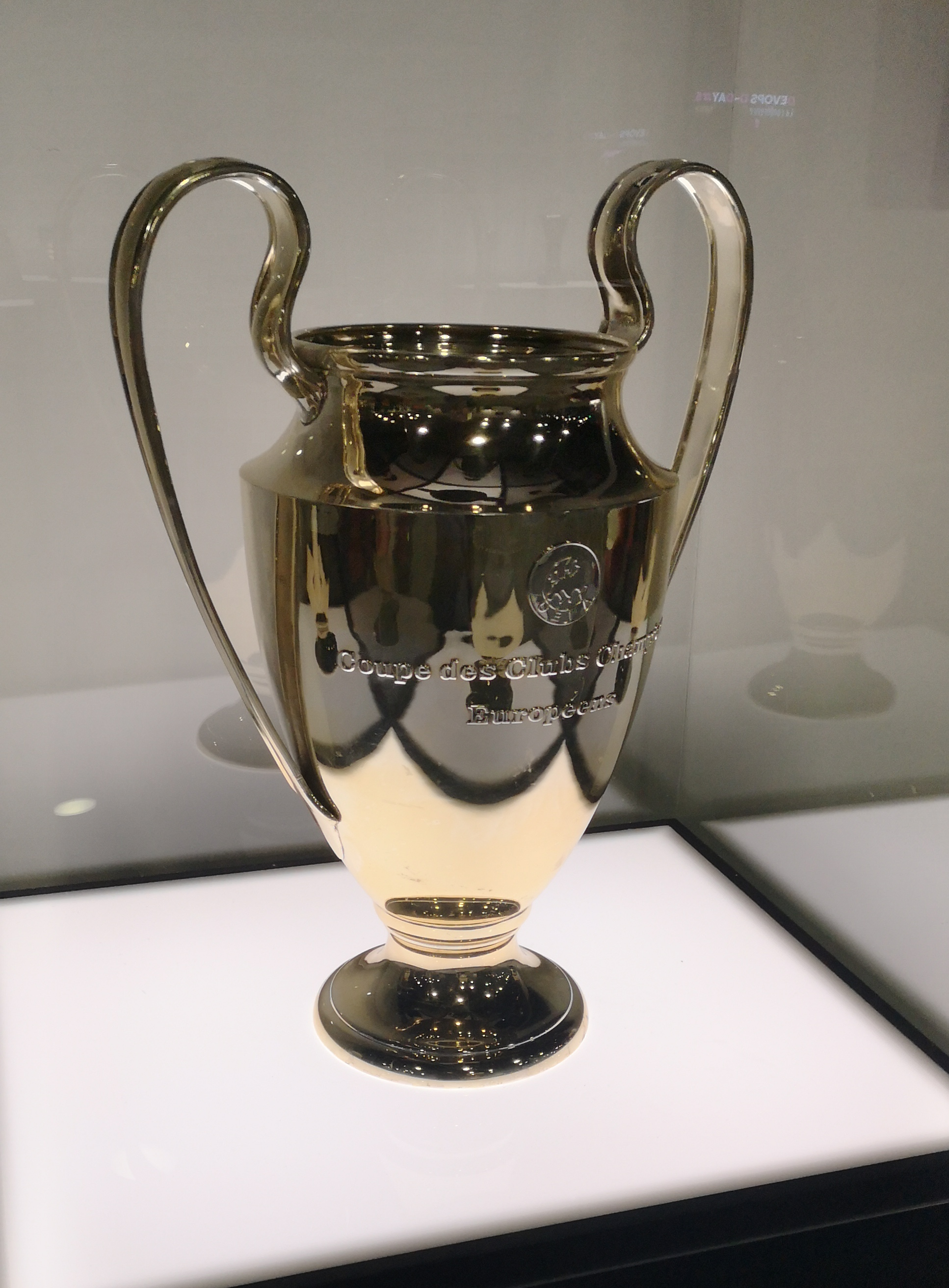
The UEFA Champions League trophy replica on display at the Stade Vélodrome in Marseille.

The 1993 UEFA Champions League final, originally known as the 1993 European Cup final, was a football match between French club Marseille and Italian club Milan, played on 26 May 1993 at the Olympiastadion in Munich.

The final, which followed the second-ever UEFA Champions League group stage, saw Ivorian-born Marseille defender Basile Boli score the only goal of the match in the 43rd minute with a header to give OM their first and only European Cup title. It was the first time a French team had won the European Cup. Marseille would be the only French club to have won the Champions League until the 2025 win of rivals Paris Saint-Germain against Milan's rivals Inter Milan, also in Munich. No other club from the French league would even reach the final until Monaco in 2004.

Marseille and their club president Bernard Tapie would later be found to have been involved in a match-fixing scandal during the 1992–93 Division 1—in which Marseille allegedly paid Valenciennes to lose a match, which saw them relegated to Division 2 and banned from participation in European football for the following season. As the scandal only affected a French league match, while Marseille's status as the 1993 European champions was not affected, they were not able to compete in the 1993 European Super Cup.

The final turned out to be the last game of Milan's highly accomplished but injury-prone Dutch forward Marco van Basten, who was 28 at the time; having been subbed off in the 86th minute due to fatigue and yet another ankle injury, he would spend the next two years in recovery before announcing his retirement in August 1995.

== Teams ==
In the following table, finals until 1992 were in the European Cup era, since 1993 were in the UEFA Champions League era.

Team	Previous final appearances (bold indicates winners)
(France) Marseille	1 (1991)
(Italy) Milan	5 (1958, **1963**, **1969**, **1989**, **1990**)

== Route to the final ==
(France) Marseille				Round	(Italy) Milan			
Opponent	Agg.	1st leg	2nd leg		Opponent	Agg.	1st leg	2nd leg
(Northern Ireland) Glentoran	8–0	5–0 (A)	3–0 (H)	First round	(Slovenia) Olimpija Ljubljana	7–0	4–0 (H)	3–0 (A)
(Romania) Dinamo București	2–0	0–0 (A)	2–0 (H)	Second round	(Czechoslovakia) Slovan Bratislava	5–0	1–0 (A)	4–0 (H)
Opponent	Result			Group stage	Opponent	Result		
(Scotland) Rangers	2–2 (A)			Matchday 1	(Sweden) IFK Göteborg	4–0 (H)		
(Belgium) Club Brugge	3–0 (H)			Matchday 2	(Netherlands) PSV Eindhoven	2–1 (A)		
(Russia) CSKA Moscow	1–1 (A)			Matchday 3	(Portugal) Porto	1–0 (A)		
(Russia) CSKA Moscow	6–0 (H)			Matchday 4	(Portugal) Porto	1–0 (H)		
(Scotland) Rangers	1–1 (H)			Matchday 5	(Sweden) IFK Göteborg	1–0 (A)		
(Belgium) Club Brugge	1–0 (A)			Matchday 6	(Netherlands) PSV Eindhoven	2–0 (H)		
**Group A winner**: Pos / Team / Pld / Pts; **1** / (France) Marseille / **6** / **9**; 2 / (Scotland) Rangers / 6 / **8**; 3 / (Belgium) Club Brugge / 6 / **5**; 4 / (Russia) CSKA Moscow / 6 / **2**; Source: UEFA				Final standings	**Group B winner**: Pos / Team / Pld / Pts; **1** / (Italy) Milan / **6** / **12**; 2 / (Sweden) IFK Göteborg / 6 / **6**; 3 / (Portugal) Porto / 6 / **5**; 4 / (Netherlands) PSV Eindhoven / 6 / **1**; Source: UEFA			

== Match ==
=== Details ===
26 May 1993
20:15 UTC+2

Marseille (France)	1–0	(Italy) Milan
Boli 44'	Report

Olympiastadion, Munich
Attendance: 64,444
Referee: Kurt Röthlisberger (Switzerland)

**Marseille**	**Milan**

GK	1	(France) Fabien Barthez	(yellow card) 70'
RB	2	(France) Jocelyn Angloma		(substituted off) 62'
LB	3	(France) Éric Di Meco	(yellow card) 31'
SW	4	(France) Basile Boli	(yellow card) 56'
CM	5	(France) Franck Sauzée
CB	6	(France) Marcel Desailly
CM	7	(France) Jean-Jacques Eydelie
CF	8	(Croatia) Alen Bokšić
LF	9	(Germany) Rudi Völler		(substituted off) 79'
RF	10	(Ghana) Abedi Pele
CM	11	(France) Didier Deschamps (c)
Substitutes:
MF	12	(France) Jean-Christophe Thomas		(substituted on) 79'
DF	13	(France) Bernard Casoni
MF	14	(France) Jean-Philippe Durand		(substituted on) 62'
FW	15	(France) Jean-Marc Ferreri
GK	16	(France) Pascal Olmeta
Manager:
(Belgium) Raymond Goethals

GK	1	(Italy) Sebastiano Rossi
RB	2	(Italy) Mauro Tassotti
CB	5	(Italy) Alessandro Costacurta
CB	6	(Italy) Franco Baresi (c)
LB	3	(Italy) Paolo Maldini
RM	7	(Italy) Gianluigi Lentini	(yellow card) 39'
CM	4	(Italy) Demetrio Albertini
CM	8	(Netherlands) Frank Rijkaard
LM	10	(Italy) Roberto Donadoni		(substituted off) 58'
CF	9	(Netherlands) Marco van Basten		(substituted off) 86'
CF	11	(Italy) Daniele Massaro
Substitutes:
GK	12	(Italy) Carlo Cudicini
CB	13	(Italy) Stefano Nava
RM	14	(Italy) Stefano Eranio		(substituted on) 86'
LM	15	(Italy) Alberico Evani
FW	16	(France) Jean-Pierre Papin		(substituted on) 58'
Manager:
(Italy) Fabio Capello

Linesmen:
Zivanko Popović (Switzerland)
Erwin Kreig (Switzerland)
Fourth official:
Serge Muhmenthaler (Switzerland)

== Aftermath ==
Marseille's triumph remains controversial due to accusations of doping alleged by Marcel Desailly, Jean-Jacques Eydelie, Chris Waddle and Tony Cascarino. According to Eydelie, "all (of them) took a series of injections" in the 1993 Champions League final, except Rudi Völler. Desailly and Cascarino claimed that club president Bernard Tapie distributed pills and injections himself. In an interview with French magazine Le Point, Jean-Pierre de Mondenard said Marseille had a blackboard in their team locker room that read "injections for everyone". Tapie only admitted that some players took captagon.

== See also ==
- 1993 European Cup Winners' Cup final
- 1993 European Super Cup
- 1993 UEFA Cup final
- 1992–93 AC Milan season
- 1992–93 Olympique de Marseille season
- AC Milan in international football
- Olympique de Marseille in European football
