= 1992–93 UEFA Champions League group stage =

Football competition

Location of teams of the 1992–93 UEFA Champions League
Brown: Group A; Red: Group B

The 1992–93 UEFA Champions League group stage, originally branded as simply the 1992–93 UEFA Champions League, began on 25 November 1992 and ended on 21 April 1993. The 8 teams were divided into two groups of four, and the teams in each group played against each other on a home-and-away basis, meaning that each team played a total of six group matches. For each win, teams were awarded two points, with one point awarded for each draw. At the end of the group stage, the first team in each group advanced to the final of the 1992–93 UEFA Champions League.

Originally, the UEFA Champions League was only the group stage, a specific phase in the European Cup.

== Teams and draw ==
The eight winners of the second round advanced to the group stage. The draw was held on 6 November 1992 in Geneva, Switzerland. The eight teams were drawn into two groups of four. The draw was open, with no seedings or pots used.

Key to colours
Group winners advanced to final

Group stage participants
Team	Coeff.
(France) Marseille	3.116
(Italy) Milan	3.052
(Belgium) Club Brugge	2.594
(Portugal) Porto	2.476
(Netherlands) PSV Eindhoven	2.412
(Scotland) Rangers	2.287
(Russia) CSKA Moscow	2.116
(Sweden) IFK Göteborg	2.080

Result of the draw
Group A	Group B
1. (France) Marseille; 2. (Belgium) Club Brugge; 3. (Russia) CSKA Moscow; 4. (Scotland) Rangers	1. (Sweden) IFK Göteborg; 2. (Portugal) Porto; 3. (Netherlands) PSV Eindhoven; 4. (Italy) Milan

== Groups ==
The matchdays were 25 November, 9 December, 3 and 17 March, and 7 and 21 April.

=== Group A ===
Pos	Team	Pld	W	D	L	GF	GA	GD	Pts	Qualification	MAR	RAN	BRU	CSKA
1	(France) Marseille	6	3	3	0	14	4	+10	9	Advance to final	—	1–1	3–0	6–0
2	(Scotland) Rangers	6	2	4	0	7	5	+2	8		2–2	—	2–1	0–0
3	(Belgium) Club Brugge	6	2	1	3	5	8	−3	5		0–1	1–1	—	1–0
4	(Russia) CSKA Moscow	6	0	2	4	2	11	−9	2		1–1	0–1	1–2	—

Source: UEFA
25 November 1992
19:30

Rangers (Scotland)	2–2	(France) Marseille
McSwegan 79'; Hateley 81'	Report	Bokšić 31'; Völler 57'

Ibrox Park, Glasgow
Attendance: 41,624
Referee: Sándor Puhl (Hungary)
25 November 1992
20:30

Club Brugge (Belgium)	1–0	(Russia) CSKA Moscow
Amokachi 16'	Report

Olympiastadion, Bruges
Attendance: 15,433
Referee: Bo Karlsson (Sweden)

9 December 1992
20:30

Marseille (France)	3–0	(Belgium) Club Brugge
Sauzée 4' (pen.); Bokšić 10', 25'	Report

Stade Vélodrome, Marseille
Attendance: 27,500
Referee: Aron Schmidhuber (Germany)
9 December 1992
20:30

CSKA Moscow (Russia)	0–1	(Scotland) Rangers
	Report	Ferguson 13'

Ruhrstadion, Bochum, Germany (Note: CSKA Moscow played their home matches in Germany instead of their regular stadium, Luzhniki Stadium, Moscow, which did not meet UEFA requirements.)
Attendance: 9,341
Referee: Kim Milton Nielsen (Denmark)

3 March 1993
20:30

CSKA Moscow (Russia)	1–1	(France) Marseille
Fayzulin 56'	Report	Pelé 28'

Olympiastadion, Berlin, Germany
Attendance: 20,000
Referee: Fabio Baldas (Italy)
3 March 1993
20:30

Club Brugge (Belgium)	1–1	(Scotland) Rangers
Dziubiński 44'	Report	Huistra 72'

Olympiastadion, Bruges
Attendance: 19,000
Referee: Antonio Martín Navarrete (Spain)

17 March 1993
20:30

Marseille (France)	6–0	(Russia) CSKA Moscow
Sauzée 5' (pen.), 34', 49'; Pelé 43'; Ferreri 71'; Desailly 79'	Report

Stade Vélodrome, Marseille
Attendance: 30,000
Referee: Serge Muhmenthaler (Switzerland)
17 March 1993
19:30

Rangers (Scotland)	2–1	(Belgium) Club Brugge
Durrant 39'; Nisbet 75'	Report	Staelens 55'

Ibrox Park, Glasgow
Attendance: 42,731
Referee: Ryszard Wójcik (Poland)

7 April 1993
20:30

Marseille (France)	1–1	(Scotland) Rangers
Sauzée 16'	Report	Durrant 52'

Stade Vélodrome, Marseille
Attendance: 46,000
Referee: Mario van der Ende (Netherlands)
7 April 1993
20:30

CSKA Moscow (Russia)	1–2	(Belgium) Club Brugge
Sergeyev 18'	Report	Schaessens 43'; Verheyen 85'

Olympiastadion, Berlin, Germany
Attendance: 2,500
Referee: Angelo Amendolia (Italy)

21 April 1993
20:30

Club Brugge (Belgium)	0–1	(France) Marseille
	Report	Bokšić 2'

Olympiastadion, Bruges
Attendance: 18,993
Referee: Ion Crăciunescu (Romania)
21 April 1993
19:30

Rangers (Scotland)	0–0	(Russia) CSKA Moscow
	Report

Ibrox Park, Glasgow
Attendance: 43,142
Referee: Peter Mikkelsen (Denmark)

=== Group B ===
Pos	Team	Pld	W	D	L	GF	GA	GD	Pts	Qualification	MIL	GOT	POR	PSV
1	(Italy) Milan	6	6	0	0	11	1	+10	12	Advance to final	—	4–0	1–0	2–0
2	(Sweden) IFK Göteborg	6	3	0	3	7	8	−1	6		0–1	—	1–0	3–0
3	(Portugal) Porto	6	2	1	3	5	5	0	5		0–1	2–0	—	2–2
4	(Netherlands) PSV Eindhoven	6	0	1	5	4	13	−9	1		1–2	1–3	0–1	—

Source: UEFA
25 November 1992
20:30

Milan (Italy)	4–0	(Sweden) IFK Göteborg
van Basten 33', 52' (pen.), 61', 63'	Report

San Siro, Milan
Attendance: 55,797
Referee: Frans Van Den Wijngaert (Belgium)
25 November 1992
20:30

Porto (Portugal)	2–2	(Netherlands) PSV Eindhoven
Magalhães 35'; Zé Carlos 75'	Report	Romário 43', 60'

Estádio do Futebol Clube do Porto, Porto
Attendance: 34,000
Referee: Antonio Martín Navarrete (Spain)

9 December 1992
20:30

IFK Göteborg (Sweden)	1–0	(Portugal) Porto
Eriksson 86'	Report

Ullevi, Gothenburg
Attendance: 22,303
Referee: Jozef Marko (Czechoslovakia)
9 December 1992
20:30

PSV Eindhoven (Netherlands)	1–2	(Italy) Milan
Romário 65'	Report	Rijkaard 19'; Simone 62'

Philips Stadion, Eindhoven
Attendance: 27,000
Referee: Aleksey Spirin (Russia)

3 March 1993
20:30

PSV Eindhoven (Netherlands)	1–3	(Sweden) IFK Göteborg
Numan 8'	Report	Nilsson 20'; Ekström 35', 45'

Philips Stadion, Eindhoven
Attendance: 27,500
Referee: Keith Burge (Wales)
3 March 1993
20:30

Porto (Portugal)	0–1	(Italy) Milan
	Report	Papin 72'

Estádio do Futebol Clube do Porto, Porto
Attendance: 55,000
Referee: Aron Schmidhuber (Germany)

17 March 1993
20:30

IFK Göteborg (Sweden)	3–0	(Netherlands) PSV Eindhoven
Nilsson 2'; Ekström 45'; Martinsson 47'	Report

Ullevi, Gothenburg
Attendance: 35,225
Referee: Ion Crăciunescu (Romania)
17 March 1993
20:30

Milan (Italy)	1–0	(Portugal) Porto
Eranio 31'	Report

San Siro, Milan
Attendance: 67,389
Referee: Philip Don (England)

7 April 1993
20:30

IFK Göteborg (Sweden)	0–1	(Italy) Milan
	Report	Massaro 70'

Ullevi, Gothenburg
Attendance: 40,323
Referee: Karl-Josef Assenmacher (Germany)
7 April 1993
20:30

PSV Eindhoven (Netherlands)	0–1	(Portugal) Porto
	Report	Zé Carlos 71' (pen.)

Philips Stadion, Eindhoven
Attendance: 27,750
Referee: Leslie Mottram (Scotland)

21 April 1993
20:30

Milan (Italy)	2–0	(Netherlands) PSV Eindhoven
Simone 5', 19'	Report

San Siro, Milan
Attendance: 56,862
Referee: Sándor Puhl (Hungary)
21 April 1993
20:30

Porto (Portugal)	2–0	(Sweden) IFK Göteborg
Zé Carlos 42'; Timofte 56'	Report

Estádio do Futebol Clube do Porto, Porto
Attendance: 15,000
Referee: David Elleray (England)
