= 1991–92 French Division 1 =

54th season of French Division 1

Division 1
- Season: 1991–92
- Champions: Marseille (8th title)
- Relegated: Rennes; Cannes; Nancy
- Champions League: Marseille
- Cup Winners’ Cup: Monaco
- UEFA Cup: Paris Saint-Germain; Auxerre; Caen
- Matches: 380
- Goals: 796 (2.09 per match)
- Top goalscorer: Jean-Pierre Papin (27)

Olympique de Marseille won Division 1 season 1991/1992 of the French Association Football League with 58 points.

== Participating teams ==
- Auxerre
- SM Caen
- AS Cannes
- Le Havre AC
- Lens
- Lille
- Olympique Lyonnais
- Olympique Marseille
- FC Metz
- AS Monaco
- Montpellier HSC
- AS Nancy
- FC Nantes Atlantique
- Nîmes Olympique
- Paris Saint-Germain FC
- Stade Rennais
- AS Saint-Etienne
- FC Sochaux-Montbéliard
- Sporting Toulon Var
- Toulouse FC
Location of teams in 1991–92 Division 1

== League table ==
Pos	Team	Pld	W	D	L	GF	GA	GD	Pts	Qualification or relegation
1	Marseille (C)	38	23	12	3	67	21	+46	58	Qualification to Champions League first round
2	Monaco	38	22	8	8	55	33	+22	52	Qualification to Cup Winners' Cup first round (Note: Monaco qualified for the 1992–93 European Cup Winners' Cup as finalists of the 1991–92 Coupe de France.)
3	Paris Saint-Germain	38	15	17	6	43	27	+16	47	Qualification to UEFA Cup first round
4	Auxerre	38	16	12	10	55	32	+23	44	Qualification to UEFA Cup first round
5	Caen	38	17	10	11	45	44	+1	44	Qualification to UEFA Cup first round
6	Montpellier	38	12	18	8	40	32	+8	42	
7	Le Havre	38	13	16	9	35	32	+3	42	
8	Lens	38	11	17	10	36	30	+6	39	
9	Nantes	38	12	14	12	37	39	−2	38	
10	Saint-Étienne	38	13	11	14	42	37	+5	37	
11	Toulouse	38	11	14	13	33	40	−7	36	
12	Metz	38	12	11	15	42	43	−1	35	
13	Lille	38	11	13	14	31	34	−3	35	
14	Toulon	38	13	6	19	41	55	−14	32	
15	Nîmes	38	9	14	15	31	50	−19	32	
16	Lyon	38	10	11	17	25	39	−14	31	
17	Sochaux	38	9	13	16	35	50	−15	31	
18	Rennes (R)	38	6	17	15	25	42	−17	29	Qualification to relegation play-offs
19	Cannes (R)	38	8	12	18	34	48	−14	28	Relegation to French Division 2
20	Nancy (R)	38	10	8	20	43	67	−24	28	Relegation to French Division 2

Rules for classification: 1) points; 2) goal difference; 3) number of goals scored.
Victory: 2 points, Draw: 1 point, Defeat: 0 points
(C) Champions; (R) Relegated
Notes:

Promoted from Ligue 2, who will play in Division 1 season 1992/1993

- Bordeaux: Champion of Division 2, winner of Division 2 group B
- Valenciennes FC: Runner-up, winner of Division 2 group A
- RC Strasbourg: Third place, winner of barrages against Stade Rennais

== Results ==
Home \ Away	AUX	CAE	CAN	LHA	RCL	LIL	OL	OM	MET	ASM	MHS	NAL	FCN	NMS	PSG	REN	STE	SOC	SCT	TFC
Auxerre		5–1	3–1	3–0	1–0	1–0	3–0	1–1	3–0	1–1	1–0	3–1	2–2	0–0	2–2	3–1	2–0	4–0	1–0	3–0
Caen	1–0		3–1	2–1	2–0	3–3	1–0	1–3	1–0	1–0	0–0	5–1	1–1	2–0	2–0	0–0	1–0	1–1	4–1	1–0
Cannes	1–1	2–0		0–0	2–1	1–1	0–0	1–2	1–1	1–2	2–0	1–1	2–0	0–0	1–1	3–1	0–2	2–1	0–1	2–0
Le Havre	1–0	0–1	1–0		1–0	0–0	1–0	0–2	0–0	3–0	3–1	1–2	1–1	1–1	1–1	0–0	2–1	1–0	3–0	1–1
Lens	0–0	0–0	1–1	0–0		0–0	4–2	2–1	0–2	0–1	1–1	1–0	0–0	0–0	1–0	0–0	1–1	1–1	2–1	4–0
Lille	1–0	1–2	0–0	0–0	1–2		1–0	0–1	0–2	1–2	1–0	2–1	0–0	1–1	0–0	1–1	2–0	0–0	1–0	3–1
Lyon	1–0	2–2	0–0	0–2	1–1	1–0		1–1	0–0	2–0	1–0	2–1	0–1	1–0	0–1	3–1	0–0	0–1	1–1	1–0
Marseille	2–0	5–0	2–0	2–0	1–1	1–0	0–0		2–0	1–1	0–0	4–0	4–0	4–2	0–0	5–1	2–0	2–2	0–1	2–0
Metz	2–1	1–2	1–2	1–1	3–2	1–0	1–1	0–0		2–0	1–3	0–1	1–1	4–0	0–0	0–0	1–0	3–1	4–1	4–0
Monaco	2–0	2–1	3–1	0–2	0–0	1–0	1–0	0–3	3–1		1–1	4–1	1–0	1–1	1–0	3–1	2–0	2–0	3–0	0–2
Montpellier	1–1	3–1	3–0	2–2	0–0	0–0	3–0	0–0	1–0	1–4		2–0	2–1	0–0	1–1	0–0	2–0	3–2	1–0	0–0
Nancy	2–1	3–0	1–0	1–3	3–1	1–2	0–0	1–3	1–3	1–4	3–1		3–1	2–3	0–0	1–1	0–2	3–1	0–0	1–1
Nantes	2–0	2–1	1–0	0–0	1–0	1–2	3–0	0–1	4–1	1–4	0–0	0–0		3–2	0–0	1–0	1–0	0–0	1–2	1–1
Nîmes	0–0	0–1	2–1	1–0	0–2	1–0	2–1	1–2	1–0	0–1	2–1	1–2	0–0		0–1	1–2	1–1	2–2	1–0	2–2
Paris SG	1–1	3–1	3–2	1–1	1–0	2–0	3–0	0–0	3–0	2–0	1–1	1–0	1–1	2–0		1–0	0–0	2–0	2–3	0–0
Rennes	1–1	1–0	0–0	0–2	0–0	2–3	0–2	1–2	3–1	0–0	0–2	3–1	0–1	1–1	0–0		0–0	2–0	0–0	1–1
Saint-Étienne	1–1	1–1	2–0	4–0	0–4	1–1	1–2	1–1	2–0	0–1	1–1	3–0	2–1	3–0	3–0	0–1		2–1	3–1	2–1
Sochaux	1–0	2–0	1–0	0–0	1–2	2–1	1–0	2–3	0–0	1–3	1–1	2–2	3–1	1–1	0–2	0–0	1–0		2–0	0–0
Toulon	0–3	0–0	4–3	4–0	0–1	1–2	1–0	1–0	1–1	1–1	0–1	4–2	0–2	5–0	2–5	1–0	1–2	2–0		1–0
Toulouse	2–3	0–0	2–0	0–0	1–1	1–0	1–0	0–2	1–0	0–0	1–1	1–0	2–1	0–1	3–0	2–0	1–1	2–1	3–0	

Legend: Blue = home team win; Yellow = draw; Red = away team win.

== Relegation play-offs ==
Team 1	Agg.	Team 2	1st leg	2nd leg
Rennes	1–4	Strasbourg	0–0	1–4

== Top goalscorers ==
Rank	Player	Club	Goals
1	(France) Jean-Pierre Papin	Marseille	27
2	(France) François Calderaro	Metz	19
3	(Liberia) George Weah	Monaco	18
4	(France) Stéphane Paille	Caen	14
4	(France) Fabrice Divert	Montpellier	14
6	(Ghana) Abedi Pele	Marseille	12
6	(France) Christian Perez	Paris Saint-Germain	12
6	(Argentina) Leonardo Rodriguez	Toulon	12
9	(France) Christophe Cocard	Auxerre	11
10	(France) Jean-Marc Ferreri	Auxerre	9
10	(France) Youri Djorkaeff	Monaco	9
10	(France) Jean-Philippe Sechet	Nancy	9
10	(France) David Zitelli	Nancy	9

== Olympique de Marseille Winning Squad 1991–'92 ==
Goal Keeper

- (France) Pascal Olmeta

Defence

- (France) Manuel Amoros
- (France) Jocelyn Angloma
- (France) Pascal Baills
- (France) Basile Boli
- (France) Bernard Casoni
- (France) Marcel Desailly
- (France) Eric Di Meco
- (Brazil) Carlos Mozer

Midfield

- (France) Alain Boghossian
- (France) Didier Deschamps
- (France) Jean-Philippe Durand
- (France) Patrice Eyraud
- (France) Jean-Christophe Marquet
- (France) Franck Sauzée
- (England) Trevor Steven
- (Socialist Federal Republic of Yugoslavia) Dragan Stojkovic (on loan)

Attack

- (France) Marc Libbra
- (France) Jean-Pierre Papin
- (Ghana) Abedi Pele
- (England) Chris Waddle
- (France) Daniel Xuereb

Management

- (Croatia) Tomislav Ivic, later (Belgium) Raymond Goethals(Coach)

== Attendances ==
#	Club	Average
1	Marseille	28,995
2	PSG	26,606
3	Lens	18,770
4	Olympique lyonnais	16,399
5	Saint-Étienne	15,370
6	Nîmes	12,240
7	Metz	11,754
8	Nantes	10,810
9	Stade rennais	10,553
10	Nancy	9,098
11	MHSC	9,083
12	Le Havre	8,666
13	Caen	8,211
14	Toulouse	8,146
15	AJA	8,099
16	LOSC	6,755
17	Monaco	6,074
18	Cannes	5,564
19	Toulon	4,660
20	Sochaux	4,011
