= Fabien Barthez =

French footballer and racing driver (born 1971)

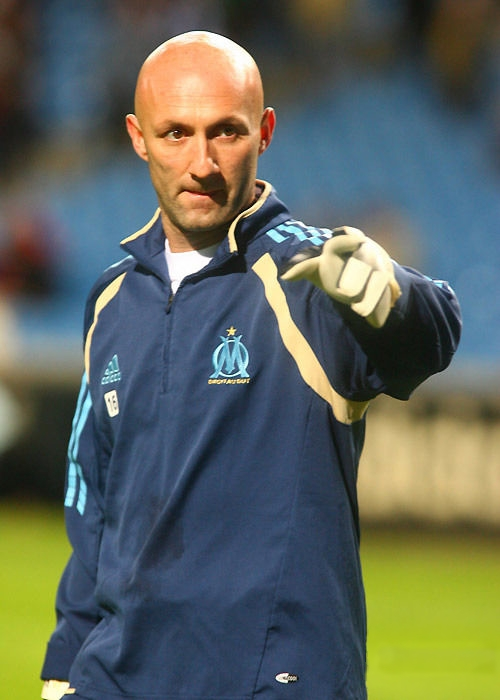
- Barthez with Marseille in 2006

Personal information
- Full name: Fabien Alain Barthez
- Date of birth: 28 June 1971 (age 55)
- Place of birth: Lavelanet, Ariège, France
- Height: 1.80 m (5 ft 11 in)
- Position: Goalkeeper

Team information
- Current team: France (goalkeeping coach)

Youth career
- 1979–1986: Stade Lavelanétien
- 1986–1990: Toulouse

Senior career*
Years	Team	Apps	(Gls)
1990–1992	Toulouse	26	(0)
1992–1995	Marseille	106	(0)
1995–2000	Monaco	143	(0)
2000–2004	Manchester United	92	(0)
2004	→ Marseille (loan)	20	(0)
2004–2006	Marseille	54	(0)
2006–2007	Nantes	16	(0)
Total		457	(0)

International career
1991	France U21	2	(0)
1994–2006	France	87	(0)
Medal record
Men's football
Representing France
FIFA World Cup
Winner	1998
Runner-up	2006
UEFA European Championship
Winner	2000
FIFA Confederations Cup
Winner	2003
- * Club domestic league appearances and goals

Fabien Alain Barthez (French pronunciation: [fabjɛ̃ baʁtɛz]; born 28 June 1971) is a French former professional footballer who played as a goalkeeper.

Nicknamed Le Divin Chauve ("The Divine Bald One"), due to his trademark shaved head, he played football in both France and England with Toulouse, Marseille, Monaco, Manchester United and Nantes. He won the UEFA Champions League with Olympique Marseille in 1993 as well as several Ligue 1 and Premier League titles. After retiring from football in 2007, Barthez began a career in motorsport in 2008.

At international level, he played for the France national team, with whom he won the 1998 FIFA World Cup, UEFA Euro 2000 and the 2003 FIFA Confederations Cup, representing his nation at a total of three editions of both the FIFA World Cup and the UEFA European Championship; he also reached the final of the 2006 FIFA World Cup, after which he retired from international football. Barthez was France's most capped player in the FIFA World Cup, with 17 appearances at the finals and shares the record for the most World Cup clean sheets with Peter Shilton, with ten. Since August 2026, he has been the goalkeeping coach of the French national team.

== Early life ==
Fabien Alain Barthez was born on 28 June 1971 in Lavelanet, Ariège.

=== Connections with the rugby world ===
Fabien Barthez is the son of Alain Barthez, a former RCNM player. In November 2015, Barthez was due to become an honorary member of the club's Socios association. According to association president Gérard Sutra, the honor reflected Barthez's friendship with Sutra, who had played alongside his father, and the Barthez family's attachment to Narbonne. As a boy, Barthez held a rugby license and played the sport until adolescence.

== Club career ==
=== Toulouse ===
Having spotted him earlier during regional selections, Élie Baup, then head of goalkeeping at Toulouse FC, brought him into the Toulouse pre-academy in 1986. Baup gave him his debut in the national Cadets league. After two successful seasons, Barthez joined the football academy, directed by Serge Delmas. Barthez made his Division 1 debut for Toulouse on 21 September 1991, against Nancy.

=== Marseille ===
After a solid performance with Toulouse against the club during the season, Barthez became a priority transfer target and subsequently joined Marseille in 1992, winning both the French league and the Champions League in his first season at the club, keeping a clean sheet during the final in a 1–0 victory over Milan. The continental victory made him the youngest goalkeeper to win a Champions League title until Iker Casillas did so in 2000.

Marseille, however, would be stripped of their domestic title, due to their involvement in a domestic match fixing scandal days before the Champions League final, and in April 1994 was officially declared relegated to Division 2 for the 1994–1995 season. He stayed with the club for the 1994–95 season, despite many offers from elite French clubs, helping Marseille to win the title. This, however, did not earn them a promotion back to Division 1 due to their massive debts and unstable financial state, directly caused by the relegation. French football's financial watchdog DNCG ruled that the club was not financially viable enough to compete in the top flight.

Following Marseille's relegation to the second tier, Barthez left the club in 1995. It was reported that his departure was motivated by a desire to continue playing in the top flight in order to maintain his position in the French national team.

=== Monaco ===
In 1995, Barthez joined Monaco and won Ligue 1 titles in 1997 and 2000. He also played in Jean Tigana's talented Monaco side, which famously put his future club Manchester United out of the Champions League in 1998 on away goals after a 1–1 draw at Old Trafford.

=== Manchester United ===
As a result of Barthez's success in the World Cup and the Euros, he caught the attention of Manchester United manager Sir Alex Ferguson, who was searching for a star goalkeeper to replace the recently departed Peter Schmeichel, as Ferguson did not think that the previous season's goalkeeper, Mark Bosnich, was a long-term replacement. Barthez joined United for £7.8 million in 2000. He was later reunited with national teammate Laurent Blanc, who joined United in 2001. The Barthez–Blanc head-kissing ritual was performed at the start of Champions League matches.

Known eccentric, Barthez started out well for Manchester United. In his first season he answered all the questions about how he would handle rainy Manchester compared to sunny Monaco. Barthez quickly became a crowd favourite. The fans loved his eccentric behaviour, his taunting dribbles and step-overs past opposing strikers, and his reaction saves. Very often, it was critical saves that kept United from defeat or dropping valuable points, helping United to the 2000–01 FA Premier League title, their third in a row.

A memorable incident happened when Manchester United faced Leeds United in March 2001. After dropping a cross from Robbie Keane, Barthez deliberately kicked out with his foot at Ian Harte, who fell to the ground on the edge of six yard box, and the referee awarded a penalty to Leeds. Harte stepped up but Barthez made a low, one-handed save to his right. The only blemish in his first season was his failed attempt at "psyching out" West Ham United's Paolo Di Canio in the FA Cup Fourth Round; Di Canio beat the offside trap, while Barthez stood still with his hand up expecting the referee to blow his whistle, or Di Canio to stop. Di Canio continued and scored the only goal of the game, and later said it was "better to score and then see whether the goalkeeper is right or wrong".

The 2001–02 season was split into two parts for him. The first half was tumultuous. The Frenchman seemed to be taking some unnecessary risks outside his penalty area, and his antics began to have consequences that allowed unneeded goals for opposing teams. He was at fault for two goals in a 3–2 home defeat by Deportivo de La Coruña in October 2001. Ferguson said how "eventually he will get caught out" and it wouldn't happen again. But another couple of late errors against Arsenal in a 3–1 defeat at Highbury the following month put much pressure on Barthez, with two goals gifted to Thierry Henry, one of which came from a mis-hit clearance. Barthez was at the centre of further controversy when, after already being on a yellow card following an argument with Matthew Upson, he was caught by television cameras raising his middle fingers behind his back towards the Arsenal supporters, who had been taunting him for his errors towards the end of the match; the incident was missed by the referee Peter Jones, however. There was much speculation as to what was the source of Barthez's decline, and critics such as the BBC's Phil McNulty urged him to be dropped. Sir Alex Ferguson, however, had faith in his goalkeeper, and stuck by him. Consequently, in the second half of the season, Barthez repaired his reputation with consistent, solid performances and the spectacular saves that he was famous for. His turn in fortunes was shown in a 2–2 draw with Derby County at Pride Park. Derby forward Malcolm Christie looked to have sealed his hat-trick, but referee Steve Dunn controversially disallowed the goal, ruling that Christie kicked the ball out of Barthez's hands.

He was also noted for playing mind games before opposition players took a penalty. The first time this occurred was in November 2001 when Leicester City came to Old Trafford. As Muzzy Izzet prepared to take a penalty, Barthez stood aside from the goal, with his hands behind him on the post. Izzet, tired of waiting, slotted the ball in the bottom corner, but referee Andy D'Urso made him retake the penalty, this time with Barthez in goal. Izzet went the same way, but Barthez denied him with a fine save to his right. An almost identical incident happened less than a year later in October 2002, when Barthez was unhappy about the awarding of a penalty to Fulham, and so went from post to post banging his boots, and refused to be in goal for the penalty. This time he was booked for his antics by referee Mike Dean, and so he then took his place between the posts and made it work again by saving Steed Malbranque's spot kick.

The 2002–03 season ended with another Premier League crown for United. The season was a mixed bag for Barthez. One highlight was a fabulous save to deny Dietmar Hamann's 30-yard rocket at Anfield against Liverpool, as United held on to win 2–1. In other games, he let goals go past him that he would have been expected to save, and suffered from a run of poor form towards the end of the season. Barthez was also widely criticized in United's exit to Real Madrid in the Champions League, especially for Ronaldo's opener which beat him at the near post. It would prove to be his last ever game with United as Sir Alex Ferguson's patience had finally run out. Barthez was dropped for the final three games of the season, with Roy Carroll taking his place.

Barthez's poor form at the end of the previous season and the arrival of American newcomer Tim Howard in summer of 2003, saw the Frenchman face competition for a starting spot at United. As Barthez had only returned from international duty in August, Howard played during the club's American tour of the summer, and his performances led Ferguson to choose him to start over Barthez in the Community Shield in August. By October, Howard had won the starting goalkeeper's job from Barthez; as a result, United agreed to release Barthez from his contract at Old Trafford after the 2003–04 season, and also agreed to loan Barthez out to his former club Marseille for the remainder of that season.

=== Return to Marseille ===
Barthez began training with Marseille, who took on a portion of his wages, but FIFA initially blocked the loan deal on the grounds that it was not agreed upon within the international transfer window. The two clubs agreed on a loan deal after the transfer window reopened on 1 January 2004, and Barthez joined Marseille soon afterwards. On 27 April, Marseille and Barthez agreed to a two-and-a-half-year contract which would keep him at the club until spring 2006. On 19 May 2004, Barthez was sent off in first-half stoppage time by referee Pierluigi Collina during the 2004 UEFA Cup final against Valencia, lost by OM 2–0.

Barthez was involved in a controversy during a friendly match between Marseille and Morocco's Wydad Casablanca on 12 February 2005. With ten minutes left, a Marseille player was sent off and a brawl erupted between players on the pitch. Barthez was reported for spitting on the Moroccan referee. On 21 April, Barthez was summoned to a hearing before the disciplinary committee of the French Football Federation (FFF); the following day, he received a six-month suspension, with the last three months being suspended. In an unusual move, the federal council of the FFF appealed the suspension, arguing that the punishment should have been for a minimum of six full months. Eventually, his suspension was extended to six full months due to political pressures.

=== Retirement ===
On 8 August 2006, Barthez announced he was still hoping to play professional football for another two years, insisting he was also looking to continue his career in the French international setup. His ideal scenario would have been a return to first club Toulouse, where he could be close enough to allow him to take care of his sick mother. But he said if he did not have a club by 31 August he would not carry on with football. On 5 October 2006, it was confirmed that he had retired from football, having failed to agree a return to Toulouse. Barthez commented: "The only club I wanted to go to was not so happy to have me. It happens and you have to live with it."

=== Comeback ===
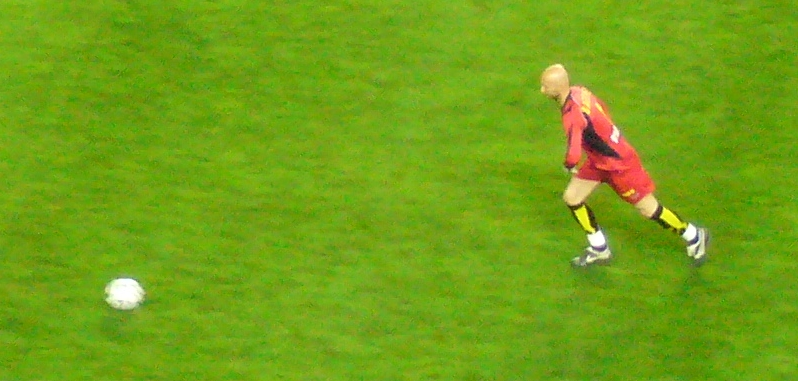
Barthez playing for Nantes in 2006

On 17 December 2006, Barthez announced his return to football by signing a contract with Ligue 1 side Nantes, who were lacking an experienced goalkeeper following Mickaël Landreau's move to Paris Saint-Germain the previous summer. Serbian goalkeeper Vladimir Stojković, originally recruited to replace Landreau, failed to impress and left Nantes at the winter break following a rift within the squad.

On 29 April, Nantes chairman Rudi Roussillon announced that following an altercation with a Nantes fan, Barthez had left the city with his family. The next day, Barthez confirmed that he had quit the team, and the club terminated his contract. Barthez denied that he was planning to retire, and in an article for French daily L'Équipe, he said that he was looking for another contract for at least two years. Barthez was linked with numerous clubs, but nothing ever materialised and he had to face never playing professional football again.

=== Luzenac ===
In 2012, Barthez became the honorary president of Championnat National team Luzenac, where he personally picked Quentin Westberg and Nicolas Dieuze to sign for the club.

== International career ==
=== Early international career ===
On 26 May 1994, Barthez won his first cap for France in a 1–0 victory against Australia. Barthez was understudy to Bernard Lama at UEFA Euro 1996 – at which France reached the semi-finals – after testing positive for cannabis earlier that year; he was suspended for two months as a result. Following a later suspension to Lama instead, however, Barthez subsequently gained the number one goalkeeping position shortly after the tournament and would not relinquish it for a decade.

=== 1998 World Cup ===
In the 1998 FIFA World Cup, which was hosted by his home country, Barthez conceded only two goals in seven games and won the Yashin Award as the best goalkeeper of the tournament, also placing second in the IFFHS World's Best Goalkeeper award that year, behind José Luis Chilavert. Barthez was also well known during the tournament for letting teammate and good friend Laurent Blanc kiss his shaved head before the start of every match, supposedly for good luck. Barthez was an integral part of his national team's inaugural triumph which also made it the first time in 20 years that a host had won the World Cup. He kept five clean sheets throughout the tournament, with the only goals he conceded being a penalty in the group stage against Denmark, and another goal against Croatia in the semi-final. In the quarter-final shootout defeat of rivals Italy, he kept a clean sheet, and also saved Demetrio Albertini's penalty kick. He kept another clean sheet in the final, which ended in a 3–0 win over defending champions Brazil. During the game, Barthez was also at the centre of a notable controversial incident when he made a spectacular save while rushing out and attempting to anticipate Brazilian superstar Ronaldo, doing his trademark leap/step-over the attacking striker to grab the ball, which injured Ronaldo in the process; Barthez later commented that he never intended to hurt the striker. Following France's World Cup victory, Barthez was one of the most popular national players in France, after Zinedine Zidane.

=== Euro 2000 ===
Two years later, Barthez was again the starter as his country won Euro 2000. It was the first time in 26 years that a national team held both the World Cup and Euro titles, a feat last accomplished by West Germany in 1974. After that triumph, France held the top position in the FIFA World Rankings system from 2001 to 2002.

=== 2002 World Cup and Euro 2004 ===
Barthez played on France's World Cup team again in 2002 in which they exited in the first round without winning a game or scoring a goal; he kept his only clean sheet of the tournament in his nation's second group match, a 0–0 draw against Uruguay. He was also his nation's starting keeper throughout their victorious Confederations Cup campaign in 2003, and at Euro 2004; in the latter tournament, he saved David Beckham's penalty shot in the opening round robin match, but France went out in the quarter-finals to eventual winners Greece.

=== 2006 World Cup ===
His place as starting goalkeeper in France's 2006 World Cup campaign, in the face of a substantial public campaign in support of Grégory Coupet, was surprising to many, even more so given Coupet's flawless performance in the remainder of the World Cup qualifying campaign after Barthez's suspension. The decision was met with derision in the French press and also led to Coupet's walking out of the national squad before the tournament, though he was to return one day later. The move was viewed by some as a desire to keep the veterans of France's 1998 World Cup victory on the team. L'Equipe reported after the World Cup that Barthez would have walked out of the squad had he not been named the starter.

France had a slow start in the group stage, drawing their first two games and putting their chances of reaching the knock-out stages at risk. Fortunately, Barthez's team found their form and won their final round robin match 2–0 to advance to the next stage, where they upset heavily favoured Spain 3–1 in the round of 16.

In defeating Brazil, 1–0 on 1 July 2006, Barthez, having made only one save in the game (on an injury time shot from Ronaldo), became the first keeper to blank the Brazilian team in consecutive World Cup finals matches, the first being the 1998 final (3–0). France is now one of only four nations (along with Italy, Argentina and the Netherlands) to have shut Brazil out twice in the World Cup finals, and the first to have done it in consecutive matches, both times with Barthez in goal.

Barthez again kept another clean sheet – his fourth of the tournament – in the semi-final against Portugal (with Zinedine Zidane's penalty shot the winning goal), though he appeared in questionable form. A few minutes from time, he spectacularly spilled a free-kick which Luís Figo recovered, heading over the bar although unchallenged. He did, however, redeem himself in injury time when a French defender fumbled the ball, enabling a Portuguese player to mount a last-moment attack. Barthez scrambled out of the net and blocked the first shot.

During the final against Italy, he briefly captained his team for the remainder of the second period of extra time after Zidane was sent off. During the penalty shootout, neither he nor his Italian counterpart Gianluigi Buffon made a save, and France striker David Trezeguet's missed shot ultimately proved decisive. This proved to be Barthez's 87th and final international appearance, as he retired from international football following the tournament.

== Motorsport career ==
Fabien Barthez
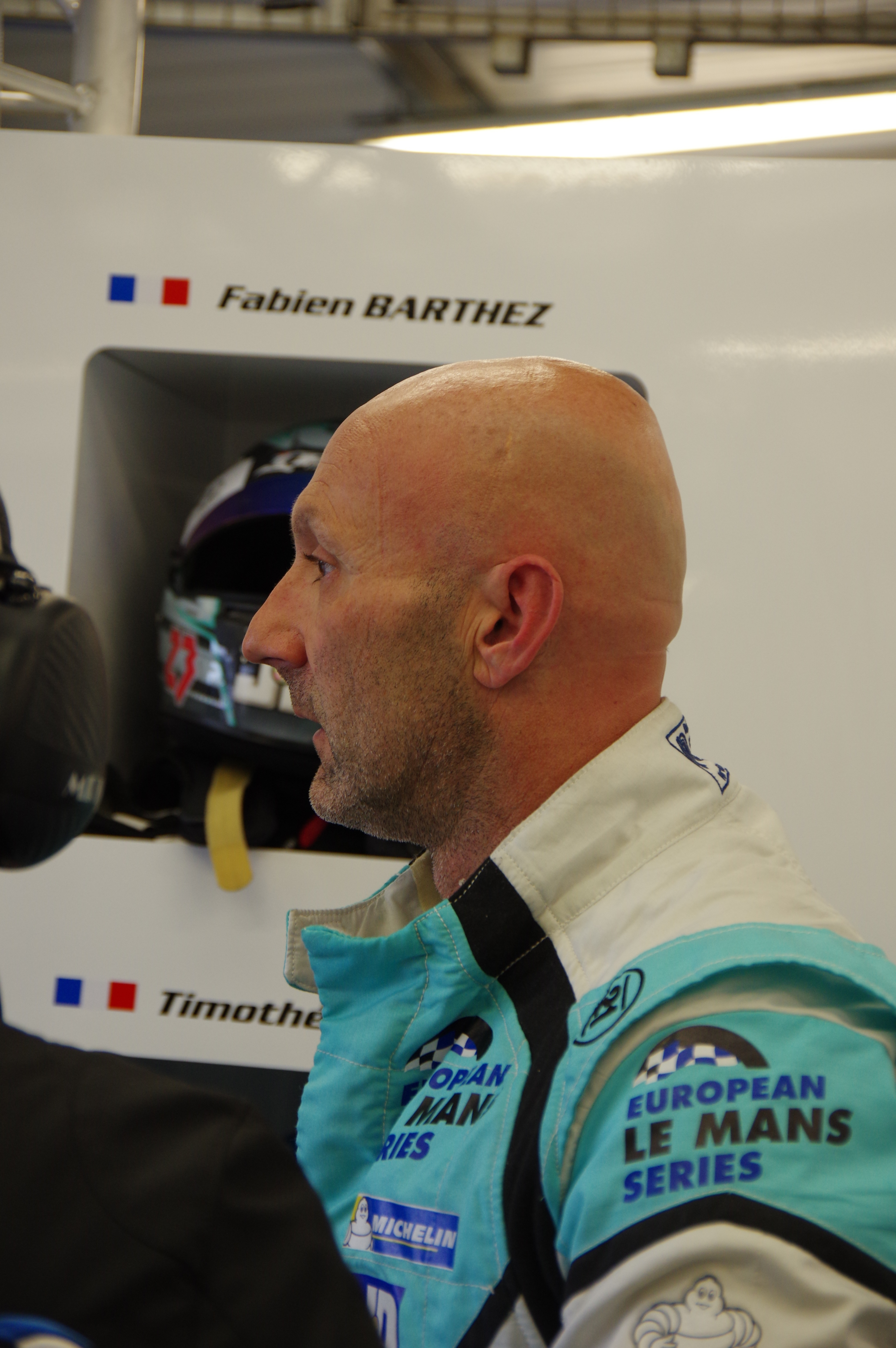
- Barthez in 2016
- Nationality: (France) French

24 Hours of Le Mans career
- Years: 2014 – 2017
- Teams: ASP, Panis Barthez
- Best finish: 12th (2016)
- Class wins: 0
- Categorisation: FIA Bronze

After retiring from football in 2007, Barthez began a career in motorsport in 2008. He began competing at selected events in the Porsche Carrera Cup France that year with the team SOFREV Auto Sport Promotion. He also competed at two events in the THP Spider Cup. In 2009, he raced in a number of various motorsport series such as the French GT Championship, Bioracing Series and the Caterham Sigma Cup France as well as the Porsche Carrera Cup France. He continued to race in the FFSA GT Championship in 2010 and picked up his first podium in race 1 at Dijon-Prenois. In the 2012 season, he won his first race in the FFSA series at the Circuito de Navarra in race two and finished seventh in the championship. In 2013, he was crowned French GT Champion alongside Morgan Moullin-Traffort, driving a Ferrari.

In 2013, Barthez also competed in the newly re-branded FIA GT Series alongside Gérard Tonelli in the Gentleman Trophy class with SOFREV ASP, driving a GT3-spec Ferrari 458 Italia.

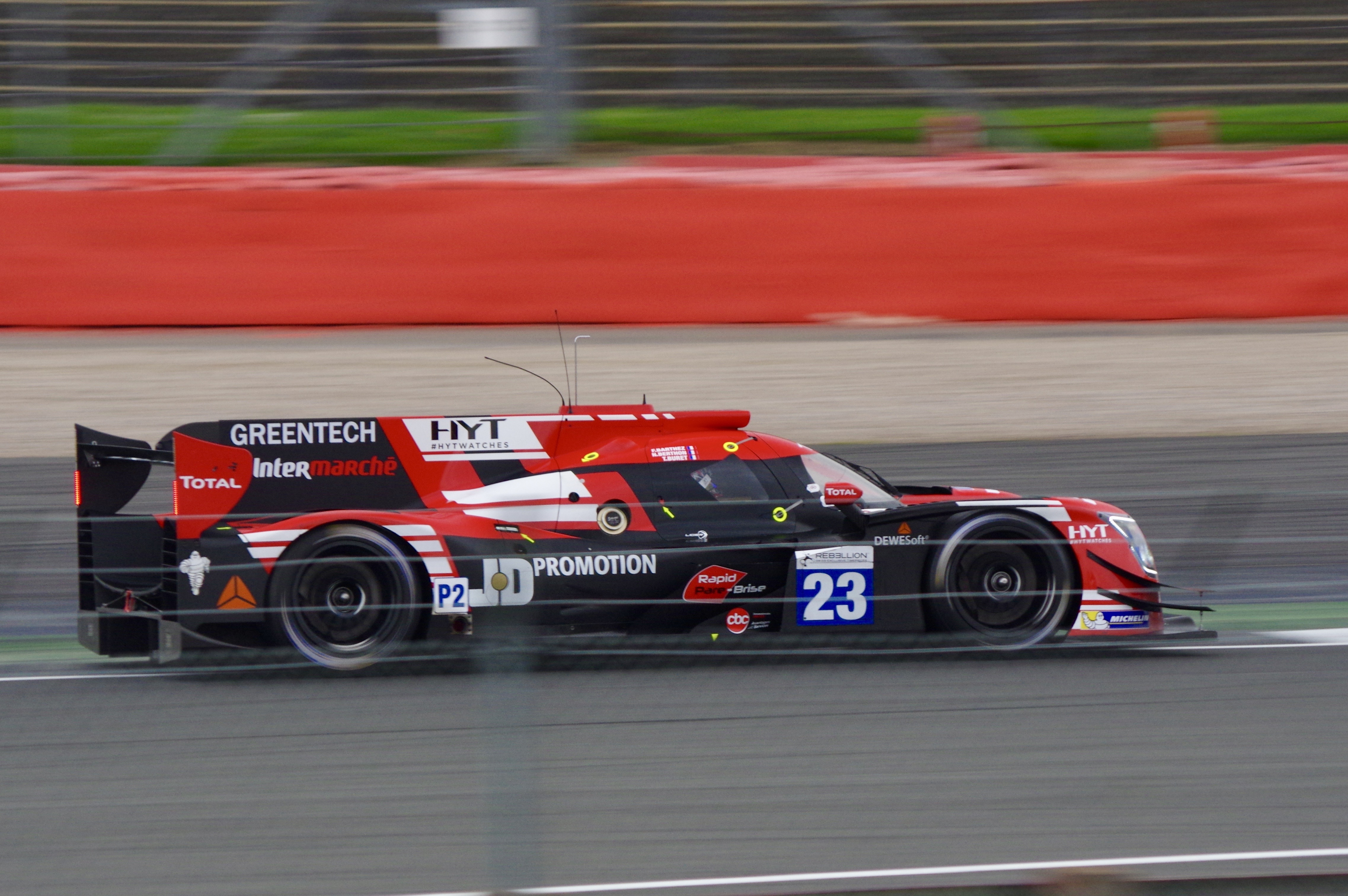
Barthez competing in the European Le Mans Series' 4 Hours of Silverstone in 2017.

In February 2014, it was announced that Barthez would enter the 2014 24 Hours of Le Mans race, driving Sofrev ASP's Ferrari 458. Barthez and his co-drivers finished 29th overall and ninth in the LMGTE Am class.

In 2016, Barthez formed his own sports car racing team, Panis Barthez Compétition, alongside former Formula One driver Olivier Panis. The pair entered cars in the European Le Mans Series and the Blancpain GT Series, overseen by Tech 1 Racing, before Barthez stepped down at the end of 2019.

=== 24 Hours of Le Mans results ===
Year	Team	Co-Drivers	Car	Class	Laps	Pos.	Class Pos.
2014	(France) Team Sofrev ASP	(France) Soheil Ayari (France) Anthony Pons	Ferrari 458 Italia GT2	LMGTE Am	325	29th	9th
2016	(France) Panis Barthez Compétition	(France) Timothé Buret (France) Paul-Loup Chatin	Ligier JS P2-Nissan	LMP2	347	12th	8th
2017	(France) Panis Barthez Compétition	(France) Nathanaël Berthon (France) Timothé Buret	Ligier JS P217-Gibson	LMP2	296	DNF	DNF

== Coaching career ==
On 2 July 2010, after Laurent Blanc's appointment as the new manager of the France national team, Barthez was named among the team's technical staff as a goalkeeping coach.

On 14 August 2026, Barthez was once again chosen as the team's goalkeeping coach after Zinedine Zidane's appointment as the new manager of the France national team.

== Style of play ==
Rated by pundits as one of the greatest goalkeepers of his generation, in his prime, Barthez was considered to be one of the best goalkeepers in the world, and is regarded as one of the best French players ever in his position, being named the fourth greatest French goalkeeper of all time in IFFHS' Century elections, behind Bernard Lama, Pierre Chayriguès and Julien Darui. Standing at 1.80 m (5 ft 11 in), according to some sources 1.78 m (5 ft 10 in), he was not particularly tall for a goalkeeper, although he was extremely athletic, and was known for his elevation, as well as his decision-making, bravery, ability to read the game and commitment when coming out to collect the ball, which made him effective in the air and enabled him to command his area effectively in spite of his short stature; however, at times, he was still caught out on high balls due to his lack of height and poor handling, and he also came under criticism on occasion for his indecisiveness when struggling to deal with crosses. A flamboyant and instinctive keeper, he was also extremely agile and possessed excellent reflexes, which enabled him to produce spectacular, acrobatic and decisive reaction saves; he also possessed a good positional sense.

In addition to his shot-stopping abilities, Barthez was also known to be a passionate, popular, and highly recognisable footballing figure, who stood out for his outgoing personality, self-assurance, and composure under pressure, as well as his leadership from the back and authoritative presence in goal. Furthermore, Barthez was highly regarded for his exceptional skills with the ball at his feet, as well as his accurate distribution with his left foot, which enabled him to play the ball out from the back or launch an attack with his quick throws or long goal kicks; his confidence in possession often led him to be involved in the build-up of plays, and he often operated outside the penalty area, and would even occasionally attempt to dribble with the ball past opposing strikers with feints such as nutmegs or stepovers. He was also very quick off his line, and often acted as a sweeper-keeper, thus contributing to the evolution of the role. While he received plaudits for his goalkeeping ability in the media, throughout his career Barthez also frequently came under criticism from pundits for his stubbornness, and his aggressive, unorthodox and eccentric style of play, as well as for taking unnecessary risks; he was also deemed to be inconsistent, unreliable and prone to errors and lapses in concentration.

== Personal life ==
Through his career, Barthez was known for his active romantic life, and dated Canadian model Linda Evangelista. She became pregnant but miscarried, six months into the pregnancy. The couple broke up in 2000, reunited in 2001, and then officially ended their relationship in 2002. Barthez is a smoker. Known for his eccentric and superstitious personality, Barthez often wore red briefs underneath his goalkeeping shorts, and usually cut off the sleeves of his goalkeeping jersey. Although most starting goalkeepers are usually assigned the number 1 shirt, he instead chose to wear the number 16 shirt. He is a practicing Zen Buddhist.

== Endorsements ==
During his playing career, Barthez signed advertising deals with McDonald's and Adidas.

== Career statistics ==
=== Club ===
Appearances and goals by club, season and competition
Club	Season	League			National cup (Note: Includes Coupe de France, FA Cup)		League cup (Note: Includes Coupe de la Ligue, Football League Cup)		Continental		Other		Total	
Club	Season	Division	Apps	Goals	Apps	Goals	Apps	Goals	Apps	Goals	Apps	Goals	Apps	Goals
Toulouse	1990–91	Division 1	0	0	0	0	–		–		–		0	0
Toulouse	1991–92	Division 1	26	0	0	0	–		–		–		26	0
Toulouse	Total		26	0	0	0	–		–		–		26	0
Marseille	1992–93	Division 1	30	0	0	0	–		10 (Note: Appearances in UEFA Champions League)	0	–		40	0
Marseille	1993–94	Division 1	37	0	1	0	–		4	0	–		42	0
Marseille	1994–95	Division 2	39	0	0	0	1	0	–		–		40	0
Marseille	Total		106	0	1	0	1	0	14	0	–		122	0
Monaco	1995–96	Division 1	21	0	0	0	1	0	1 (Note: Appearance(s) in UEFA Cup)	0	–		23	0
Monaco	1996–97	Division 1	36	0	3	0	3	0	10	0	–		52	0
Monaco	1997–98	Division 1	30	0	3	0	0	0	10	0	1 (Note: Appearance in Trophée des Champions)	0	44	0
Monaco	1998–99	Division 1	32	0	4	0	2	0	–		–		38	0
Monaco	1999–2000	Division 1	24	0	5	0	2	0	5	0	–		36	0
Monaco	Total		143	0	15	0	8	0	26	0	1	0	193	0
Manchester United	2000–01	Premier League	30	0	1	0	0	0	12	0	1 (Note: Appearance in FA Charity Shield)	0	44	0
Manchester United	2001–02	Premier League	32	0	1	0	0	0	15	0	1	0	49	0
Manchester United	2002–03	Premier League	30	0	2	0	4	0	10	0	–		46	0
Manchester United	2003–04	Premier League	0	0	0	0	0	0	0	0	0	0	0	0
Manchester United	Total		92	0	4	0	4	0	37	0	2	0	139	0
Marseille (loan)	2003–04	Ligue 1	20	0	2	0	0	0	9	0	–		31	0
Marseille	2004–05	Ligue 1	30	0	1	0	4	0	–		–		35	0
Marseille	2005–06	Ligue 1	24	0	4	0	1	0	7	0	–		36	0
Marseille	Total		54	0	5	0	5	0	7	0	–		71	0
Nantes	2006–07	Ligue 1	16	0	0	0	–		–		0	0	16	0
Career total			457	0	27	0	18	0	93	0	3	0	598	0

=== International ===
Appearances and goals by national team and year
National team	Year	Apps	Goals
France	1994	1	0
France	1995	1	0
France	1996	2	0
France	1997	5	0
France	1998	12	0
France	1999	8	0
France	2000	10	0
France	2001	5	0
France	2002	9	0
France	2003	9	0
France	2004	10	0
France	2005	3	0
France	2006	11	0
Total		87	0

== Honours ==
Marseille

- UEFA Champions League: 1992–93
- Division 2: 1994–95
- UEFA Cup runner-up: 2003–04

Monaco

- Division 1: 1996–97, 1999–2000
- Trophée des Champions: 1997

Manchester United

- Premier League: 2000–01, 2002–03
- Football League Cup runner-up: 2002–03

France

- FIFA World Cup: 1998; runner-up: 2006
- UEFA European Championship: 2000
- FIFA Confederations Cup: 2003

Individual

- Onze Mondial: 1997, 1998, 1999, 2000, 2001
- FIFA World Cup Yashin Award: 1998
- FIFA World Cup All-Star Team: 1998
- Division 1 Goalkeeper of the Year: 1998
- IFFHS World's Best Goalkeeper: 2000
- UEFA European Championship Team of the Tournament: 2000
- PFA Team of the Year: 2000–01 Premier League
- Équipe type spéciale 20 ans des trophées UNFP: 2011
- The Dream Team 110 years of OM: 2010
- Most clean sheets in the Premier League: 2000–01

Orders

- Knight of the Legion of Honour: 1998
