= List of IFK Göteborg records and statistics =

This article is about the records and statistics of the football section of IFK Göteborg. For the statistics of other sections, see IFK Göteborg (sports club).

== Honours ==
=== Domestic ===
- Swedish Champions (Note: The title of "Swedish Champions" has been awarded to the winner of four different competitions over the years. Between 1896 and 1925 the title was awarded to the winner of Svenska Mästerskapet, a stand-alone cup tournament. No club were given the title between 1926 and 1930 even though the first-tier league Allsvenskan was played. In 1931 the title was reinstated and awarded to the winner of Allsvenskan. Between 1982 and 1990 a play-off in cup format was held at the end of the league season to decide the champions. After the play-off format in 1991 and 1992 the title was decided by the winner of Mästerskapsserien, an additional league after the end of Allsvenskan. Since the 1993 season the title has once again been awarded to the winner of Allsvenskan.)
  - Winners (18): 1908, 1910, 1918, 1934–35, 1941–42, 1957–58, 1969, 1982, 1983, 1984, 1987, 1990, 1991, 1993, 1994, 1995, 1996, 2007

==== League ====
- Allsvenskan:
  - Winners (13): 1934–35, 1941–42, 1957–58, 1969, 1982, 1984, 1990, 1991, 1993, 1994, 1995, 1996, 2007
  - Runners-up (13): 1924–25, 1926–27, 1929–30, 1939–49, 1979, 1981, 1986, 1988, 1997, 2005, 2009, 2014, 2015
- Svenska Serien:
  - Winners (5): 1912–13, 1913–14, 1914–15, 1915–16, 1916–17
- Fyrkantserien:
  - Winners (2): 1918, 1919
- Mästerskapsserien:
  - Winners (1): 1991
- Division 2
  - Winners (3): 1938–39, 1950–51, 1976
  - Runners-up (2): 1972, 1975

==== Cups ====
- Svenska Cupen:
  - Winners (8): 1978–79, 1981–82, 1982–83, 1991, 2008, 2012–13, 2014–15, 2019–20
  - Runners-up (5): 1985–86, 1998–99, 2004, 2007, 2009
- Allsvenskan play-offs:
  - Winners (5): 1982, 1983, 1984, 1987, 1990
  - Runners-up (1): 1985
- Svenska Mästerskapet:
  - Winners (3): 1908, 1910, 1918
- Svenska Supercupen:
  - Winners (1): 2008
  - Runners-up (4): 2009, 2010, 2013, 2015
- Kamratmästerskapen:
  - Winners (11): 1909, 1910, 1912, 1913, 1914, 1915, 1920, 1921, 1922, 1924, 1940
  - Runners-up (2): 1906, 1908

=== European ===
- UEFA Cup:
  - Winners (2): 1981–82, 1986–87
- European Cup/UEFA Champions League:
  - Semi-finals (2): 1985–86, 1992–93
  - Quarter-finals (3): 1984–85, 1988–89, 1994–95
- UEFA Cup Winners' Cup:
  - Quarter-finals (1): 1979–80
- Royal League:
  - Runners-up (1): 2004–05

=== Doubles, trebles and quadruples ===
==== Doubles ====
- Fyrkantserien and Svenska Mästerskapet (Swedish Champions):
  - Winners (1): 1918
- Allsvenskan play-offs (Swedish Champions) and Svenska Cupen:
  - Winners (1): 1983
- Allsvenskan and Allsvenskan play-offs (Swedish Champions):
  - Winners (2): 1984, 1990
- Svenska Cupen and Svenska Supercupen:
  - Winners (1): 2008

==== Trebles ====
- Allsvenskan, Allsvenskan play-offs (Swedish Champions) and the UEFA Cup:
  - Winners (1): 1987
- Allsvenskan, Mästerskapsserien (Swedish Champions) and Svenska Cupen:
  - Winners (1): 1991

==== Quadruples ====
- Allsvenskan, Allsvenskan play-offs (Swedish Champions), Svenska Cupen and the UEFA Cup:
  - Winners (1): 1982

== Records ==
- Home victory, Allsvenskan: 9-1 vs. IK Sleipner, 10 May 1925; 8-0 vs. Hammarby IF, 2 June 1925; 8-0 vs. Stattena IF, 21 April 1930
- Away victory, Allsvenskan: 9-2 vs. IFK Eskilstuna, 8 October 1933; 7-0 vs. IK Sleipner, 20 April 1941
- Home loss, Allsvenskan: 2-9 vs. Malmö FF, 10 September 1949
- Away loss, Allsvenskan: 0-7 vs. IFK Norrköping, 1 May 1960
- Highest attendance, Nya Ullevi: 52,194 vs. Örgryte IS, 3 June 1959
- Highest attendance, Gamla Ullevi: 31,064 vs. GAIS, 27 May 1955
- Highest attendance, Slottsskogsvallen: 21,580 vs. AIK, 25 October 1931
- Highest attendance, The New Gamla Ullevi: 18,276 vs Djurgårdens IF
- Highest average attendance, season: 23,796, 1977
- Most appearances, total: 609, Mikael Nilsson 1987–2001
- Most appearances, Allsvenskan: 348, Bengt Berndtsson 1951–1967
- Most goals scored, total: 333, Filip Johansson 1924–1934
- Most goals scored, Allsvenskan: 180, Filip Johansson 1924–1934
- Most goals scored, season, Allsvenskan: 39, Filip Johansson 1924/25
