= Jean-Christophe Thomas =

French footballer (born 1964)

Personal information
- Date of birth: 16 October 1964 (age 62)
- Place of birth: Châlons-sur-Marne, France
- Height: 1.83 m (6 ft 0 in)
- Position: Midfielder

Youth career
- 1982–1985: Sochaux

Senior career*
| Years | Team | Apps | (Gls) |
| 1985–1992 | Sochaux | 286 | (31) |
| 1992–1994 | Marseille | 35 | (0) |
| 1994–1996 | Rennes | 58 | (2) |
| 1996–1998 | Saint-Étienne | 26 | (0) |
- * Club domestic league appearances and goals

Jean-Christophe Thomas (born 16 October 1964) is a French former footballer who played as a midfielder. He came on for Rudi Völler in the 78th minute of Olympique de Marseille's 1–0 win over AC Milan in the Champions League final on 26 May 1993. He finished his career in 1998 with the team 'Saint-Étienne'.

== Honours ==
Sochaux

- Coupe Gambardella: 1983

Marseille

- UEFA Champions League: 1992–93
