= Jean-Philippe Durand =

French footballer (born 1960)

Personal information
- Date of birth: 11 November 1960 (age 65)
- Place of birth: Lyon, France
- Height: 1.77 m (5 ft 10 in)
- Position: Midfielder

Youth career
- ?-1980: Lyon
- 1980-1981: Toulouse

Senior career*
Years	Team	Apps	(Gls)
1981–1989	Toulouse	195	(26)
1989–1991	Bordeaux	62	(2)
1991–1997	Marseille	168	(10)
Total		435	(39)

International career
1988–1992	France	26	(0)
- * Club domestic league appearances and goals

Jean-Philippe Durand (born 11 November 1960) is a French former professional footballer who played as a midfielder.

In his playing career, he played for Olympique Marseille and France at Euro 1992. Whilst at Marseille, he played in the victorious 1993 UEFA Champions League Final.

== Honours ==
Marseille

- Division 1: 1991–92
- UEFA Champions League: 1992–93
- Division 2: 1994–95
