= Mikael Nilsson (footballer, born 1968) =

Swedish footballer

Personal information
- Full name: Jan Mikael Nilsson
- Date of birth: 28 September 1968 (age 58)
- Place of birth: Falköping, Sweden
- Height: 1.86 m (6 ft 1 in)
- Position: Defender

Youth career
- Tomtens IF

Senior career*
Years	Team	Apps	(Gls)
1985–1987	IFK Falköping FF	32	(3)
1987–2001	IFK Göteborg	284	(21)
Total		316	(24)

International career
1986	Sweden U19	4	(3)
1988–1990	Sweden U21	14	(1)
1991–1996	Sweden	22	(0)
Medal record
Sweden
FIFA World Cup
Bronze medal – third place	1994
- * Club domestic league appearances and goals

Jan Mikael Nilsson (Swedish pronunciation: [ˈmîːkaɛl ˈnɪ̌lːsɔn]; born 28 September 1968) is a Swedish former footballer who played as a defender. He most notably played for IFK Göteborg with which he won six Swedish Championships and played in the UEFA Champions League. A full international between 1991 and 1996, he won 22 caps for the Sweden national team and represented his country at UEFA Euro 1992 and at the 1994 FIFA World Cup where Sweden finished third.

== Club career ==
Nilsson played for a local club called Tomtens IF and IFK Falköping until 1987 when he moved to IFK Göteborg, where he stayed until he ended his active career in 2001 due to an eye injury. During these years, he played 609 first team matches, which is a club record. He also won six Swedish Championships with the club and played in several European competitions.

== International career ==
Nilsson played 22 international matches for the Sweden national team, and was part of the UEFA Euro 1992 and 1994 FIFA World Cup squads, he did however not play any matches in any of the tournaments. He also represented the Sweden U19 and U21 teams, and competed at the 1990 UEFA European Under-21 Championship where Sweden reached the semi-finals before being eliminated by the Soviet Union.

== Legacy ==
In ITV's Greatest Champions League Goals programme, Nilsson's two strikes against PSV Eindhoven were number twenty and nineteen on the list of the top 50 goals, including a magnificent free-kick with an insane amount of curve, which probably is what he is best known for. One of Clive Tyldesley's famous quotes was "Now they know he can shoot, oh they know he can shoot", referred to Nilsson's second strike against PSV.

== Career statistics ==
=== International ===
Appearances and goals by national team and year
National team	Year	Apps	Goals
Sweden	1991	6	0
Sweden	1992	1	0
Sweden	1993	0	0
Sweden	1994	7	0
Sweden	1995	5	0
Sweden	1996	3	0
Total		22	0

== Honours ==
IFK Göteborg

- Swedish Champion: 1990, 1991, 1993, 1994, 1995, 1996

Sweden

- FIFA World Cup third place: 1994

Individual

- Årets ärkeängel: 1994
- Stor Grabb: 1995

Records

- Most appearances for IFK Göteborg: 609
