= Éric Di Meco =

French footballer (born 1963)

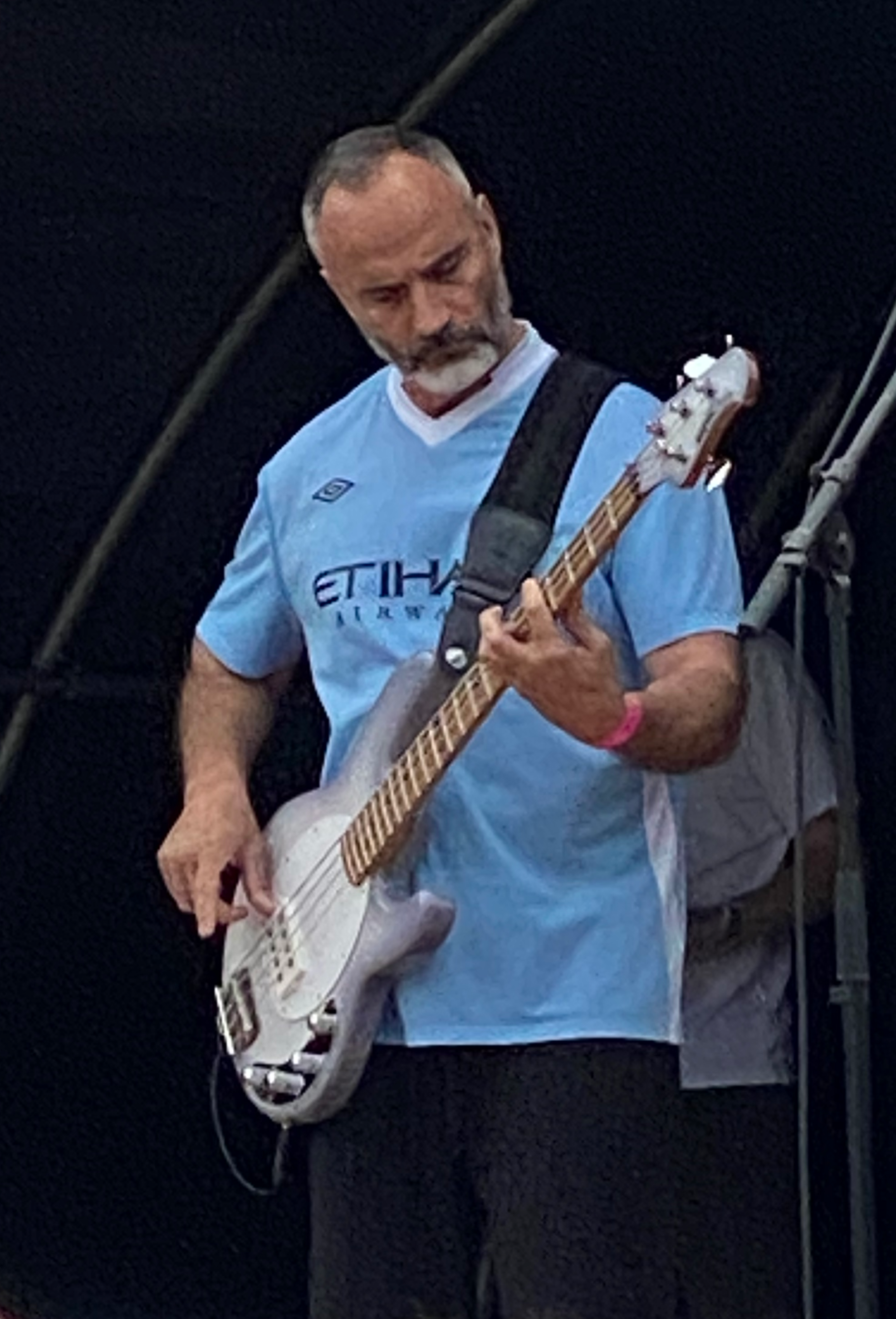
- Di Meco in 2025

Personal information
- Full name: Éric Yves Di Meco
- Date of birth: 7 September 1963 (age 63)
- Place of birth: Avignon, Vaucluse, France
- Height: 1.82 m (6 ft 0 in)
- Position: Left back

Youth career
- 1971–1977: Robion
- 1977–1980: MJC Avignon

Senior career*
| Years | Team | Apps | (Gls) |
| 1980–1994 | Marseille | 216 | (10) |
| 1986–1987 | → Dijon (loan) | 30 | (1) |
| 1987–1988 | → RC Paris (loan) | 31 | (2) |
| 1994–1998 | Monaco | 65 | (1) |
| Total | | 342 | (14) |

International career
| 1989–1996 | France | 23 | (0) |
- * Club domestic league appearances and goals

Éric Yves Di Meco (born 7 September 1963) is a French former professional footballer who played as a left back.

== Club career ==
Di Meco was born in Avignon, Vaucluse. During his career, he played mostly for Marseille. After starting as a midfielder, and serving loans at Nancy and Martigues, he returned definitely in 1988, going on to amass a further 153 Ligue 1 games in an eventual four-in-a-row run of domestic leagues.

After Marseille's relegation at the end of the 1993–94 season, due to irregularities, Di Meco joined Monaco, still appearing regularly until his 1998 retirement at almost 35 years of age, with another league title conquered.

== International career ==
For France, Di Meco won the Kirin Cup in 1994 and was in roster for UEFA Euro 1996. After the latter competition, where he acted as backup to the younger Bixente Lizarazu, he retired from international football.

== Post-retirement ==
After retiring from the pitch, Di Meco pursued a career as a politician, acting as municipal council for UMP in Marseille. He is also a musician, and in 2020 formed Osiris, an Oasis tribute act for which he plays bass guitar.

== Honours ==
Marseille

- Division 1: 1988–89, 1989–90, 1990–91, 1991–92
- Coupe de France: 1988–89
- UEFA Champions League/European Cup: 1992–93; runner-up: 1990–91

Monaco

- Division 1: 1996–97

France

- Kirin Cup: 1994

Orders

- Knight of the National Order of Merit: 1996
