= Bernard Casoni =

French football manager (born 1961)

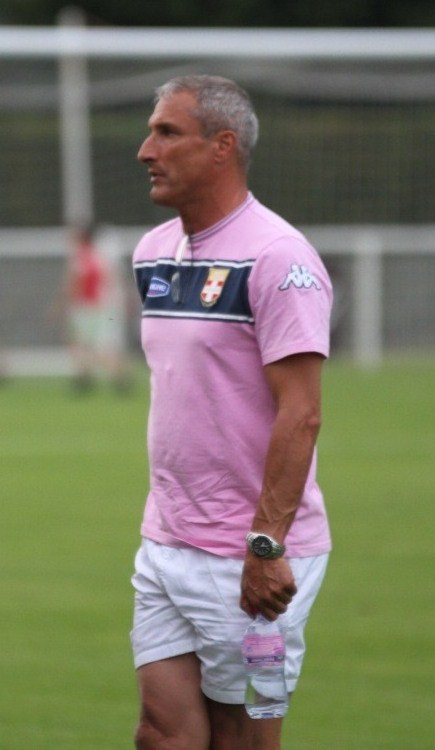
- Casoni with Évian in 2011

Personal information
- Full name: Bernard René Michel Casoni
- Date of birth: 4 September 1961 (age 65)
- Place of birth: Cannes, France
- Height: 1.78 m (5 ft 10 in)
- Positions: Centre back; left back

Youth career
- 1970–1980: Cannes

Senior career*
Years	Team	Apps	(Gls)
1978–1984	Cannes	126	(8)
1984–1988	Toulon	130	(1)
1988–1989	Matra Racing	27	(1)
1989–1990	Toulon	36	(0)
1990–1996	Marseille	169	(3)
Total		488	(13)

International career
1988–1992	France	30	(0)

Managerial career
- 1999–2000: Marseille
- 2001: Cannes
- 2002: Etoile du Sahel
- 2003: Stade Tunisien
- 2004–2005: Armenia
- 2005–2009: Bastia
- 2010–2012: Évian
- 2012: Club Africain
- 2012–2014: Auxerre
- 2014–2015: Valenciennes
- 2015: Videoton
- 2016–2017: Lorient
- 2017–2018: MC Alger
- 2018–2019: Al-Khor
- 2019: MC Alger
- 2020–2021: MC Oran
- 2021: MC Oujda
- 2021: IR Tanger
- 2023: Orléans
- * Club domestic league appearances and goals

Bernard René Michel Casoni (born 4 September 1961) is a French football manager and former professional player who played as a defender. In his playing career he played for Marseille and France at Euro 1992.

== Career ==
=== Managerial career ===
==== Évian ====
In January 2010, Casoni was named manager of Évian Thonon Gaillard whom he guided two successive promotions. In his first year, Championnat National side Évian reached the top of the league and then promoted to the Ligue 2 in the next season. In the 2010–11 Ligue 2, Évian won the Champion titles for the second straight year and secured promotion to the Ligue 1 for the first time since established in 2003. He voluntarily resigned from his position on 2 January 2012 in the winter break of the season.

==== Auxerre ====
On 17 March 2014, Casoni was sacked as coach of Auxerre with the club just one point above the second tier's relegation zone.

==== Videoton ====
On 10 June 2015, Casoni was appointed as the coach of the Hungarian League club Videton of Székesfehérvár. On 19 August 2015, Casoni was sacked from Videoton after four defeats in five Nemzeti Bajnokság I matches in the 2015–16 season and after one victory and two draws and one defeat in the 2015–16 UEFA Champions League. Casoni's early farewell was hugely affected by the resignation of the club director of Videoton, Győző Burcsa.

In an interview with the Hungarian sport magazine, Nemzeti Sport, Casoni said that he was disappointed by Videoton since the club let their key players (Nikolić, Calatayud, and Sándor) to be signed by other clubs and no new quality players were signed to replace them. In the interview, he also said that players like Ádám Gyurcsó and István Kovács were of mediocre quality.

=== Al-Khor ===
On 25 September 2018, Casoni was appointed as the new head coach of Al-Khor.

== Honours ==
=== Player ===
Marseille

- Division 1: 1990–91, 1991–92
- UEFA Champions League: 1992–93; runner-up: 1990–91
- Division 2: 1994–95

=== Manager ===
Videoton

- Hungarian Super Cup runner-up: 2015
