= Rudi Völler =

German footballer and manager

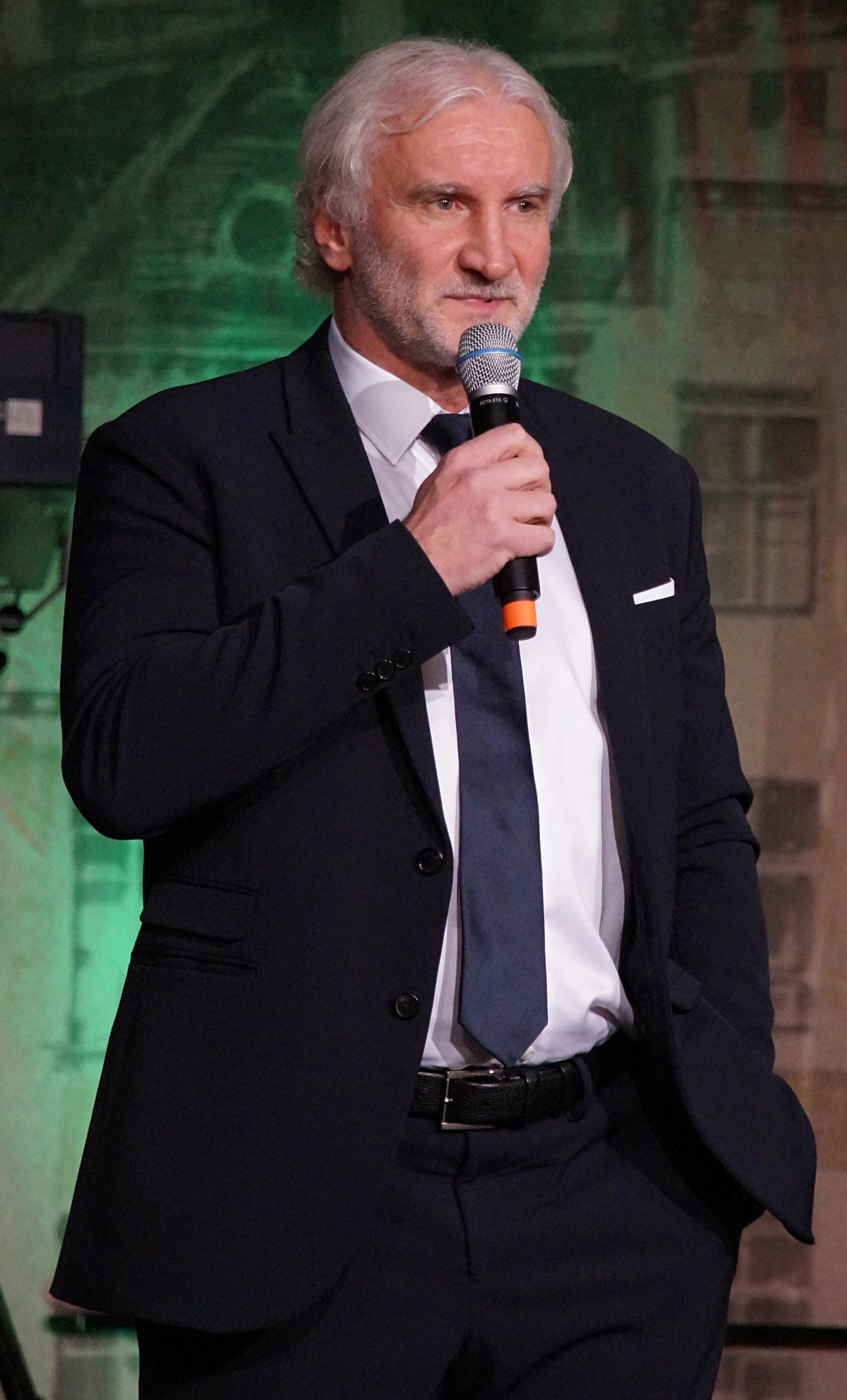
- Völler in 2016

Personal information
- Full name: Rudolf Völler
- Date of birth: 13 April 1960 (age 66)
- Place of birth: Hanau, West Germany
- Height: 1.80 m (5 ft 11 in)
- Position: Forward

Team information
- Current team: Germany (sporting director)

Youth career
- 1966–1975: TSV Hanau
- 1975–1977: Kickers Offenbach

Senior career*
Years	Team	Apps	(Gls)
1977–1980	Kickers Offenbach	73	(19)
1980–1982	1860 Munich	70	(46)
1982–1987	Werder Bremen	137	(97)
1987–1992	Roma	142	(45)
1992–1994	Marseille	58	(24)
1994–1996	Bayer Leverkusen	62	(26)
Total		542	(257)

International career
1979–1982	West Germany U21	19	(10)
1980	West Germany B	3	(0)
1982–1994	West Germany/Germany	90	(47)

Managerial career
- 1996–2000: Bayer Leverkusen (sporting director)
- 2000: Bayer Leverkusen
- 2000–2004: Germany
- 2004: Roma
- 2005: Bayer Leverkusen
- 2005–2022: Bayer Leverkusen (sporting director)
- 2023–: Germany (sporting director)
- 2023: Germany (caretaker)
Medal record
Men's football
Representing Germany
FIFA World Cup
Winner	1990 Italy
Runner-up	1986 Mexico
UEFA European Championship
Runner-up	1992 Sweden
- * Club domestic league appearances and goals

Rudolf "Rudi" Völler (pronounced [ˈfœlɐ]; born 13 April 1960) is a German football executive and former player and coach who is the sporting director of the Germany national team. During his active years as a player, he was sometimes nicknamed "Tante Käthe" ("Aunt Kathy"), a name bestowed upon him by Thomas Berthold in reference to his permed hairstyle, and in Italy, he is nicknamed "Il tedesco volante" ("The flying German") by supporters of Roma.

A forward, Völler began his professional career at Kickers Offenbach, before joining 1860 Munich, and he was top scorer of the 2. Bundesliga in the 1981–82 season. He went on to play for Werder Bremen, where he was noted for his consistent goalscoring, becoming the top scorer of the Bundesliga in the 1982–83 season. Völler moved abroad, firstly transferring to Serie A club Roma and then to Ligue 1 club Marseille. At Roma, he won the Coppa Italia and was runner-up in the UEFA Cup during the 1990–91 season; he was also top scorer of both these tournaments. At Marseille, he won the French title and the Champions League in the 1992–93 season, but following a match fixing scandal, the club were stripped of their league title and were relegated in 1994. The same year, Völler returned to his native country, ending his career at Bayer Leverkusen.

Völler made his debut for the Germany national team, then known as West Germany, in 1982. He represented his country at three FIFA World Cups and UEFA European Championships each, during a successful period for Die Nationalmannschaft. Völler played in two consecutive World Cup finals, both of which were against Argentina, and he won the trophy in 1990. At the time of his retirement in 1994, he was Germany's second highest goalscorer behind Gerd Müller; he is now joint-fourth with Jürgen Klinsmann, having been surpassed by Miroslav Klose and Lukas Podolski.

After retiring as a player with Bayer Leverkusen, he became the sporting director of the club until 2000, where he was the interim manager for twelve matches, before being succeeded by Berti Vogts. He was then appointed caretaker manager of the Germany national team, despite his lack of coaching experience. In the wake of the drug scandal that involved the preferred choice of the DFB, Christoph Daum, Völler was ultimately kept on, and was able to lead Germany to the 2002 FIFA World Cup final, where they lost to Brazil. Along with Mário Zagallo, Franz Beckenbauer and Didier Deschamps, Völler has the distinction of reaching a World Cup final as both a player (1986 and 1990) and as a manager (2002). Following a group-stage exit at UEFA Euro 2004, Völler resigned as manager, after which he had a short-lived spell as manager of his former club Roma. He later returned to Leverkusen, where he was briefly interim manager again, and became the club's sporting director for the second time, a position he held until 2022. In February 2023, he was appointed sporting director of the Germany national team.

== Early life ==
Rudolf Völler was born on 13 April 1960 in Hanau, Hesse, West Germany.

== Club career ==
Völler started his career with 1860 Hanau, then played for second division sides Kickers Offenbach and 1860 Munich, before joining Bundesliga club Werder Bremen in 1982, winning his first cap for West Germany that same year. Following a successful season in which he was the Bundesliga's top scorer, foreign clubs became interested in the striker, and in 1987 he was transferred to Roma, where he became a mainstay of the team and earned the nickname "er tedesco" ("the German") and also "il tedesco volante" ("the flying German"). He won the Coppa Italia in 1991 and was the club's top scorer on several occasions.

In 1992, Roma decided to sell Völler to Marseille, where he was intended as replacement for superstar striker Jean-Pierre Papin. That also allowed Roma to add Claudio Caniggia as its third foreigner to the squad, so both parties were happy to let the deal go through. There, he won his biggest club honour in a very successful first season, thanks to the UEFA Champions League won with Marseille against AC Milan coached by Fabio Capello, in 1993 (1–0, goal scored by Basile Boli). Völler started the match, playing 78 minutes. Marseille was then caught in a bribery scandal, however, and was stripped of its 1993 league title, and were relegated despite a second-place finish in 1994. Völler scored 24 league goals for the club but departed after its relegation. Returning to Germany, he joined Bayer Leverkusen in 1994, where he ended his career as a player in 1996 and started a career in the management of the club.

== International career ==
Völler was capped 90 times for the Germany national team, scoring 47 goals, including eight in World Cup final rounds.

In 1982, Völler represented West Germany at the 1982 UEFA European Under-21 Championship, where he was named the tournament's Golden Player. He scored four goals from three appearances at the tournament finals as the German team finished as runner-up to England.

He made his debut for the senior West Germany team in a UEFA Euro 1984 qualifier against Northern Ireland. He scored his first goal for the national team in the following qualifying match against Albania. He went on to score doubles against both Austria and Turkey to end the qualifying campaign with five goals. At the tournament finals in France, he scored both of West Germany's goals in their 2–1 win over Romania in their second group match. A 90th minute defeat against Spain in their next match, however, saw West Germany eliminated.

At the 1986 FIFA World Cup in Mexico, Völler scored the West Germans' equalizer in a 2–1 win over Scotland in the group stage. He scored an 89th-minute goal against France in the semi-final to seal a 2–0 win and, in the final itself, his 80th-minute goal made it 2–2 against Argentina. Germany had recovered from 2–0 down but eventually lost the match 3–2. Völler became the third player to score as a substitute in the World Cup final, after Dick Nanninga in 1978 and Alessandro Altobelli achieved this feat in 1982.

West Germany hosted Euro 1988, and Völler scored twice in a 2–0 win over Spain but the hosts lost to eventual winners the Netherlands in the semi-final.

Völler was a member of the team that won the 1990 World Cup in Italy. He scored three times in the tournament, including one goal in a 4–1 win over Yugoslavia, and then found the net twice against the United Arab Emirates in a 5–1 win. During the second-round match against the Netherlands, Völler and Dutch player Frank Rijkaard were sent off the field after the Dutchman spat on Völler twice. In the semi-final against England, Völler limped off injured in the first half and was replaced by Karl-Heinz Riedle. However, Völler recovered to start the final against Argentina, which West Germany won 1–0 to claim their third World Cup title.

The unsavoury incident that took place during the second-round match with the Netherlands started when Rijkaard was booked for a bad tackle on Völler. As Rijkaard took up position for the free kick, he spat in Völler's hair. Völler complained to the referee and was booked as well. From the resulting free kick, a furious Völler then jumped up and punched the ball with his hand (although it looked like he had used his head) and then dived to avoid a collision with Dutch goalkeeper Hans van Breukelen, although it also looked as if he had dived for a penalty. Van Breukelen was angry at this, but Rijkaard again confronted Völler by twisting his ear and stamping on his foot. The temperamental and tough Argentine referee Juan Carlos Loustau finally had enough of Völler's and Rijkaard's antics and he sent both players off. Rijkaard then again spat in Völler's hair as they left the pitch and was rumoured to have repeated this on the touchline. Rijkaard later stated that it was his fault: "That day I was wrong. There was no insult. I always had much respect for Rudi Völler. But I went berserk when I saw that red card. I talked to him after the match and I apologized. I'm very happy that he accepted. I have no bad feeling about him now. We even posed for a very funny advert together, years after." (Rijkaard had family problems in this time).

Völler was again selected for Euro 1992 in Sweden but was sent home when he suffered an injury in the opening game with CIS.

At the 1994 World Cup in the United States, Völler made just one sub appearance in the group stages as he was kept out of the starting line-up for all three group games by Jürgen Klinsmann and Karl-Heinz Riedle who scored five goals between them. He did start the second round tie with Belgium and scored twice in a 3–2 win. His final appearance for the national team came in the 2–1 quarter-final loss to Bulgaria on 10 July 1994.

== Managerial and executive career ==
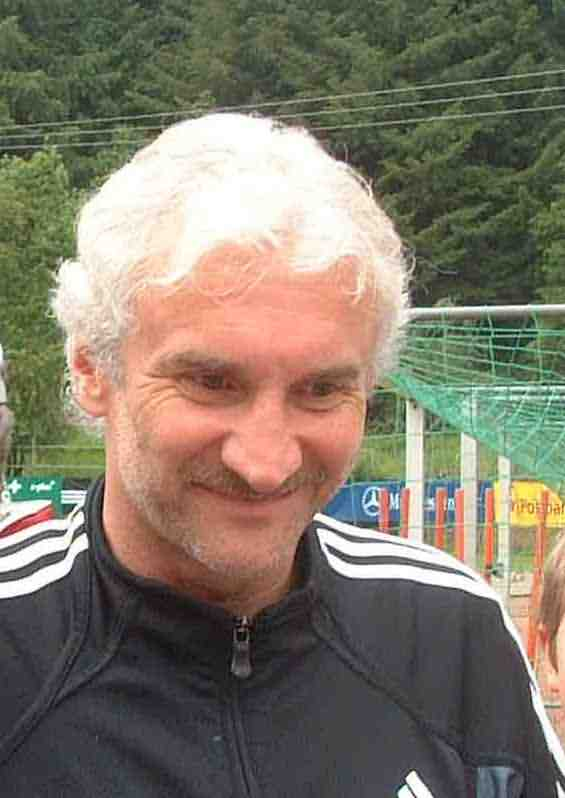
Völler as Germany manager in 2004

After a disappointing Euro 2000 for Germany under manager Erich Ribbeck, the German Football Association (DFB) appointed Völler as new manager, accepting his lack of coaching qualifications at the time. Initially, he only planned to take interimistic responsibility for one year, following the decision by Bayer Leverkusen and Völler himself (as sporting director of the club) not to make Christoph Daum step down from the national team before 2001. However, Völler extended his contract due to good results, after Daum became involved in a controversial drug scandal. Despite losing to England 5–1 at home, and two disappointing draws against Finland during qualification, he managed to lead the team to a surprising appearance in the final of the 2002 World Cup against Brazil but lost 2–0.

Völler would resign as manager following Germany's group-stage exit from Euro 2004. Following his resignation from the German national job, Völler briefly made a comeback at Roma in 2004 as manager. Hired in late August as a last-minute appointment after the shock resignation of Cesare Prandelli, he left the club only one month later after a series of poor results and high-profile disagreements with players, notably Antonio Cassano. He only signed a one-year contract to allow a return of Prandelli the next year, but presided over only one draw and two defeats in the league.

Moving back to the support ranks at Bayer Leverkusen, Völler was named as caretaker manager of Leverkusen on 16 September 2005 after the club sacked coach Klaus Augenthaler. Völler served in that role until Michael Skibbe was named as the club's new permanent coach that October. After the arrival of Skibbe, Völler was promoted to become for the second time to being sporting director at Leverkusen.

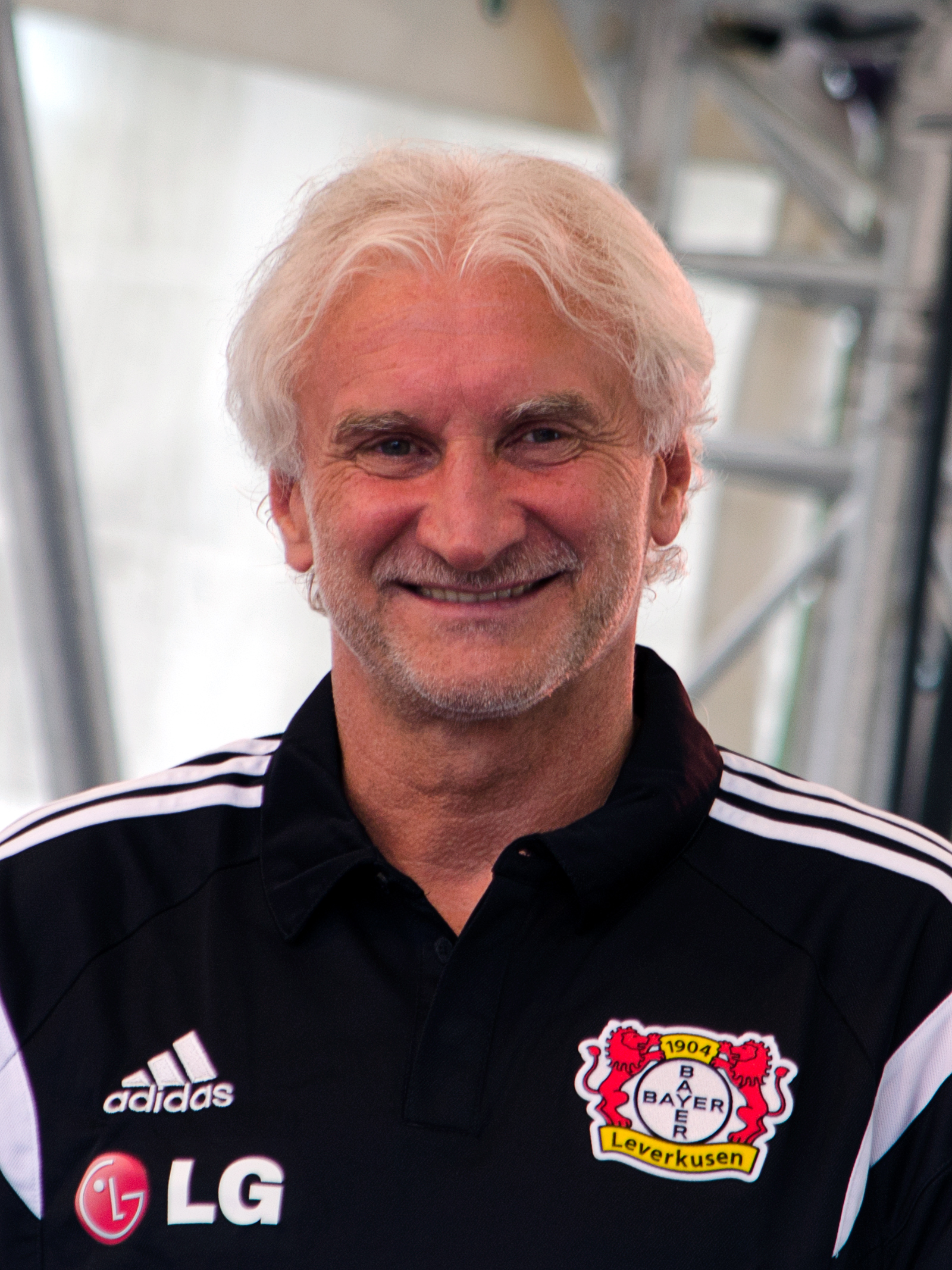
Völler during his time as sporting director of Bayer Leverkusen

Völler was (and still is) very popular in Germany. Even when the national squad achieved only modest results, Völler never lost his popularity as the German public knew he was achieving as much as possible with a relatively limited squad. His predecessor Berti Vogts, by contrast, was widely criticised, even during periods of success with a far more talented German squad. The public even forgave Völler when – during a TV interview after a 0–0 draw against Iceland in September 2003 – he lost his temper and yelled at the presenter Waldemar Hartmann in order to defend his team against, what he thought was, unfair press statements.

On 1 February 2023, Völler became the sporting director of the Germany national team. On 10 September 2023, following the sacking of Hansi Flick, Völler was named as interim manager of the national team for their friendly against France, which Germany won 2–1.

== Personal life ==
Völler has two children from German ex-wife Angela; one of them is Marco, a basketball executive and professional player. Later on in 1995, he married a local woman from Rome during his stay in Italy, adopting her daughter from a previous relationship and having one more son with her.

== Career statistics ==
=== Club ===
Appearances and goals by club, season and competition
Club	Season	League			National cup (Note: Includes DFB-Pokal, Coppa Italia, Coupe de France)		Europe		Other		Total	
Club	Season	Division	Apps	Goals	Apps	Goals	Apps	Goals	Apps	Goals	Apps	Goals
Kickers Offenbach	1977–78	2. Bundesliga	6	1	—		—		—		6	1
Kickers Offenbach	1978–79	2. Bundesliga	29	11	1	2	—		—		30	13
Kickers Offenbach	1979–80	2. Bundesliga	38	7	5	2	—		—		43	9
Kickers Offenbach	Total		73	19	6	4	—		—		79	23
1860 Munich	1980–81	Bundesliga	33	9	2	1	—		—		35	10
1860 Munich	1981–82	2. Bundesliga	37	37	2	2	—		—		39	39
1860 Munich	Total		70	46	4	3	—		—		74	49
Werder Bremen	1982–83	Bundesliga	31	23	1	2	8 (Note: Appearances in UEFA Cup)	11	—		40	36
Werder Bremen	1983–84	Bundesliga	31	18	4	1	9	2	—		44	21
Werder Bremen	1984–85	Bundesliga	32	25	4	1	2	0	—		38	26
Werder Bremen	1985–86	Bundesliga	13	9	1	1	6	4	—		20	14
Werder Bremen	1986–87	Bundesliga	30	22	1	0	1	0	—		32	22
Werder Bremen	Total		137	97	11	5	26	17	—		174	119
Roma	1987–88	Serie A	21	3	7	2	—		—		28	5
Roma	1988–89	Serie A	29	10	7	3	6	2	1 (Note: Appearance in Serie A UEFA Cup qualification)	0	43	15
Roma	1989–90	Serie A	32	14	6	2	—		—		38	16
Roma	1990–91	Serie A	30	11	10	4	12	10	—		52	25
Roma	1991–92	Serie A	30	7	2	0	3 (Note: Appearances in European Cup Winners' Cup)	0	1 (Note: Appearance in Supercoppa Italiana)	0	36	7
Roma	Total		142	45	32	11	22	12	2	0	198	68
Marseille	1992–93	Division 1	33	18	3	2	8 (Note: Appearances in UEFA Champions League)	2	—		44	22
Marseille	1993–94	Division 1	25	6	4	0	—		—		29	6
Marseille	Total		58	24	7	2	8	2	—		73	28
Bayer Leverkusen	1994–95	Bundesliga	30	16	1	0	3	0	—		34	16
Bayer Leverkusen	1995–96	Bundesliga	32	10	5	2	4 (Note: Appearances in UEFA Intertoto Cup)	3	—		41	15
Bayer Leverkusen	Total		62	26	6	2	7	3	—		75	31
Career total			542	257	66	27	63	34	2	0	673	318

=== International ===
Appearances and goals by national team and year
National team	Year	Apps	Goals
Germany	1982	1	0
Germany	1983	10	7
Germany	1984	10	4
Germany	1985	8	4
Germany	1986	10	7
Germany	1987	6	3
Germany	1988	10	4
Germany	1989	5	3
Germany	1990	13	8
Germany	1991	6	2
Germany	1992	6	2
Germany	1993	0	0
Germany	1994	5	3
Total		90	47

Scores and results list Germany's goal tally first, score column indicates score after each Völler goal.

List of international goals scored by Rudi Völler
No.	Date	Venue	Opponent	Score	Result	Competition
1	30 March 1983	Qemal Stafa Stadium, Tirana, Albania	Albania	1–0	2–1	UEFA Euro 1984 qualifying
2	7 September 1983	Népstadion, Budapest, Hungary	Hungary	1–1	1–1	Friendly
3	5 October 1983	Parkstadion, Gelsenkirchen, West Germany	Austria	2–0	3–0	UEFA Euro 1984 qualifying
4	5 October 1983	Parkstadion, Gelsenkirchen, West Germany	Austria	3–0	3–0	UEFA Euro 1984 qualifying
5	26 October 1983	Olympic Stadium, West Berlin, West Germany	Turkey	1–0	5–1	UEFA Euro 1984 qualifying
6	26 October 1983	Olympic Stadium, West Berlin, West Germany	Turkey	3–0	5–1	UEFA Euro 1984 qualifying
7	15 February 1984	Spartak Stadium, Varna, Bulgaria	Bulgaria	2–0	3–2	Friendly
8	29 February 1984	Heysel Stadium, Brussels, Belgium	Belgium	1–0	1–0	Friendly
9	28 March 1984	Niedersachsenstadion, Hanover, West Germany	Soviet Union	1–1	2–1	Friendly
10	17 June 1984	Stade Félix-Bollaert, Lens, France	Romania	1–0	2–1	UEFA Euro 1984
11	17 June 1984	Stade Félix-Bollaert, Lens, France	Romania	2–1	2–1	UEFA Euro 1984
12	24 February 1985	Estádio da Luz, Lisbon, Portugal	Portugal	2–0	2–1	FIFA World Cup 1986 qualifying
13	17 April 1985	Rosenaustadion, Augsburg, West Germany	Bulgaria	1–0	4–1	Friendly
14	17 April 1985	Rosenaustadion, Augsburg, West Germany	Bulgaria	4–1	4–1	Friendly
15	25 September 1985	Råsunda Stadium, Stockholm, Sweden	Sweden	1–0	2–2	FIFA World Cup 1986 qualifying
16	11 May 1986	Ruhrstadion, Bochum, West Germany	Yugoslavia	1–1	1–1	Friendly
17	14 May 1986	Westfalenstadion, Dortmund, West Germany	Netherlands	1–0	3–1	Friendly
18	14 May 1986	Westfalenstadion, Dortmund, West Germany	Netherlands	2–0	3–1	Friendly
19	8 June 1986	Estadio La Corregidora, Santiago de Querétaro, Mexico	Scotland	1–1	2–1	FIFA World Cup 1986
20	25 June 1986	Estadio Jalisco, Guadalajara, Mexico	France	2–0	2–0	FIFA World Cup 1986
21	29 June 1986	Estadio Azteca, Mexico City, Mexico	Argentina	2–2	2–3	FIFA World Cup 1986
22	29 October 1986	Prater Stadium, Vienna, Austria	Austria	1–1	1–4	Friendly
23	12 August 1987	Olympic Stadium, West Berlin, West Germany	France	1–0	2–1	Friendly
24	12 August 1987	Olympic Stadium, West Berlin, West Germany	France	2–0	2–1	Friendly
25	23 September 1987	Volksparkstadion, Hamburg, West Germany	Denmark	1–0	1–0	Friendly
26	17 June 1988	Olympic Stadium, Munich, West Germany	Spain	1–0	2–0	UEFA Euro 1988
27	17 June 1988	Olympic Stadium, Munich, West Germany	Spain	2–0	2–0	UEFA Euro 1988
28	31 August 1988	Olympic Stadium, Helsinki, Finland	Finland	1–0	4–0	FIFA World Cup 1990 qualifying
29	31 August 1988	Olympic Stadium, Helsinki, Finland	Finland	2–0	4–0	FIFA World Cup 1990 qualifying
30	22 March 1989	Vasil Levski National Stadium, Sofia, Bulgaria	Bulgaria	1–1	2–1	Friendly
31	4 October 1989	Westfalenstadion, Dortmund, West Germany	Finland	4–0	6–1	FIFA World Cup 1990 qualifying
32	15 November 1989	Müngersdorfer Stadion, Cologne, West Germany	Wales	1–1	2–1	FIFA World Cup 1990 qualifying
33	25 April 1990	Neckarstadion, Stuttgart, West Germany	Uruguay	2–1	3–3	Friendly
34	30 May 1990	Parkstadion, Gelsenkirchen, West Germany	Denmark	1–0	1–0	Friendly
35	10 June 1990	Stadio Giuseppe Meazza, Milan, Italy	Yugoslavia	4–1	4–1	FIFA World Cup 1990
36	15 June 1990	Stadio Giuseppe Meazza, Milan, Italy	United Arab Emirates	1–0	5–1	FIFA World Cup 1990
37	15 June 1990	Stadio Giuseppe Meazza, Milan, Italy	United Arab Emirates	5–1	5–1	FIFA World Cup 1990
38	10 October 1990	Råsunda Stadium, Stockholm, Sweden	Sweden	2–0	3–1	Friendly
39	31 October 1990	Stade Josy Barthel, Luxembourg City, Luxembourg	Luxembourg	3–0	3–2	UEFA Euro 1992 qualifying
40	19 December 1990	Neckarstadion, Stuttgart, Germany	Switzerland	1–0	4–0	Friendly
41	16 October 1991	Frankenstadion, Nuremberg, Germany	Wales	2–0	4–1	UEFA Euro 1992 qualifying
42	20 November 1991	King Baudouin Stadium, Brussels, Belgium	Belgium	1–0	1–0	UEFA Euro 1992 qualifying
43	30 May 1992	Parkstadion, Gelsenkirchen, Germany	Turkey	1–0	1–0	Friendly
44	14 October 1992	Rudolf-Harbig-Stadion, Dresden, Germany	Mexico	1–0	1–1	Friendly
45	8 June 1994	Varsity Stadium, Toronto, Canada	Canada	2–0	2–0	Friendly
46	2 July 1994	Soldier Field, Chicago, United States	Belgium	1–0	3–2	FIFA World Cup 1994
47	2 July 1994	Soldier Field, Chicago, United States	Belgium	3–1	3–2	FIFA World Cup 1994

== Managerial statistics ==
As of 22 September 2023

Team	From	To	Record					
Team	From	To	G	W	D	L	Win %	Ref.
Germany	2 July 2000	24 June 2004	53	29	11	13	54.72	
Bayer Leverkusen	21 October 2000	11 November 2000	12	7	3	2	58.33	
Roma	31 August 2004	27 September 2004	6	1	1	4	16.67	
Bayer Leverkusen	16 September 2005	9 October 2005	5	2	1	2	40.00	
Germany	10 September 2023	22 September 2023	1	1	0	0	100.00	
Total			77	40	16	21	51.95	—

== Honours ==
=== Player ===
Roma

- Coppa Italia: 1990–91
- UEFA Cup runner-up: 1990–91

Marseille

- UEFA Champions League: 1992–93

Germany

- FIFA World Cup: 1990; runner-up: 1986
- UEFA European Championship runner-up: 1992

Individual

- UEFA European Under-21 Football Championship Golden Player: 1982
- 2. Bundesliga top goalscorer: 1981–82
- Bundesliga top goalscorer: 1982–83
- kicker Bundesliga Team of the Season: 1982–83, 1983–84, 1984–85, 1994–95
- Footballer of the Year (Germany): 1983
- UEFA Euro Team of the Tournament: 1984
- UEFA Cup top goalscorer: 1990–91
- AS Roma Hall of Fame: 2014

=== Manager ===
Germany

- FIFA World Cup runner-up: 2002

=== Other ===
Orders

- Bundesverdienstkreuz am Bande: 2002
- Order of Merit of North Rhine-Westphalia: 2008

== See also ==
- List of FIFA World Cup top goalscorers
