= Basile Boli =

Footballer (born 1967)

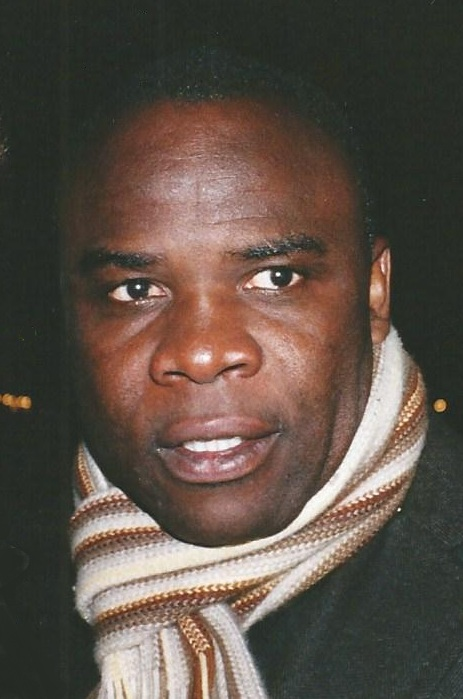
- Boli in 2005

Personal information
- Full name: Basile Boli
- Date of birth: 2 January 1967 (age 59)
- Place of birth: Abidjan, Ivory Coast
- Height: 1.82 m (6 ft 0 in)
- Position: Defender

Senior career*
Years	Team	Apps	(Gls)
1983–1990	Auxerre	254	(4)
1990–1994	Marseille	131	(20)
1994–1995	Rangers	28	(2)
1995–1996	Monaco	11	(0)
1996–1997	Urawa Reds	32	(2)
Total		456	(28)

International career
1986–1993	France	45	(1)
- * Club domestic league appearances and goals

Basile Boli (born 2 January 1967) is a French former professional footballer who played as a defender, and currently television sports presenter. He spent the majority of his career in the 1980s and 1990s with Auxerre and Marseille, and towards the end of his career had spells at Scottish club Rangers, at Monaco, and at Japanese side Urawa Reds. Although born in Ivory Coast, he also made 45 appearances and scored one goal for the France national team, and was part of the France squad at the 1992 European Championship.

== Career ==
Born in Abidjan, Ivory Coast, Boli moved to France at an early age and began his career in local youth football in Paris, before signing for Auxerre in 1982. A powerful defender, Boli made his way into the Auxerre first team and soon made his debut for the France national team in 1986 for whom he went on to win 45 caps. His form meant that he soon became a transfer target for the leading clubs in France. Finally, in 1990, Boli signed for Marseille who, under Bernard Tapie, were fast becoming the leading club in France. Boli starred as the club won Ligue 1 in 1991 and 1992 and was also a regular in the club's 1992–93 UEFA Champions League campaign, topping the season off by scoring the only goal of the final against A.C. Milan that gave the cup to OM. Whilst at the club, he even joined teammate Chris Waddle in recording a song entitled "We've Got a Feeling". He is remembered by football fans in England for his appearance for France against the England team in Euro 92 where he headbutted Stuart Pearce.

Despite his success at Marseille, Boli was forced to leave in 1994 following revelations of a match fixing scandal and the relegation of the club. He signed for Rangers for £2 million in the summer of that year and went on to make 28 league appearances (two goals) during the 1994–95 season, securing a league winners' medal. Boli left Rangers at the end of that season and wound down his career with a season back in France with Monaco, before ending his career in 1997 after a spell in Japan with Urawa Red Diamonds.

=== Danse avec les stars ===
- In 2018, he participated in season 9 of Danse avec les stars (the French version of Dancing with the Stars) with his partner Katrina Patchett and finished seventh out of eleven contestants.

This table shows the route of Basile Boli and Katrina Patchett in Danse Avec Les Stars. Face to face aren't rated.

Week	Dancing style	Music	Judge points				Total	Ranking	Result
Week	Dancing style	Music	Patrick Dupond	Shy'm	Chris Marques	Jean-Marc Généreux	Total	Ranking	Result
1	Samba	Sapés comme jamais - Maître Gims	7	6	4	4	21/40	9/11	No Elimination
2 (+ imposed figure)	Jive (+5 points)	"Jump" - Van Halen	7	6	6	6	30/45	6=/11	Safe
1+2	Jive (+5 points)	"Jump" - Van Halen	7	6	6	6	51/85	9/11	Safe
3	Foxtrot Cha-Cha-Cha (face to face)	"I Believe I Can Fly" - R. Kelly "You're the First, the Last, My Everything" - Barry White	8	6	5	6	25/40	8/9	Bottom 2 (Safe with 76%)
4	Salsa	"Gangnam Style" - Psy	7	7	5	6	25/40	7/7	Safe
5	Quickstep Salsa marathon (+4 points) Contemporary dance (face to face)	"Bewitched Theme" - Howard Greenfield "La Salsa du démon" - Le Grand Orchestre du Splendid "Frozen" - Madonna	7 N/A	8 N/A	5 N/A	6 N/A	30/54	6/7	Eliminated (24%)

== Personal life ==
Boli is the uncle of current players Yannick Boli, Charles Boli, Roli Boli and Kévin Boli, and is the younger brother of former striker Roger Boli.

== Career statistics ==
=== Club ===
Appearances and goals by club, season and competition
Club	Season	League			National cup (Note: Includes Coupe de France, Scottish Cup, Emperor's Cup)		League cup (Note: Includes Scottish League Cup, J.League Cup)		Continental		Total	
Club	Season	Division	Apps	Goals	Apps	Goals	Apps	Goals	Apps	Goals	Apps	Goals
Auxerre	1982–83	Division 1	1	0	–		–		–		1	0
Auxerre	1983–84	Division 1	35	0	1	0	–		–		36	0
Auxerre	1984–85	Division 1	36	1	1	0	–		2 (Note: Appearances in UEFA Cup)	0	39	1
Auxerre	1985–86	Division 1	36	2	6	0	–		2	0	44	2
Auxerre	1986–87	Division 1	38	0	4	0	–		–		42	0
Auxerre	1987–88	Division 1	35	0	5	0	–		2	0	42	0
Auxerre	1988–89	Division 1	37	1	8	1	–		–		45	2
Auxerre	1989–90	Division 1	36	0	2	0	–		10	1	48	1
Auxerre	Total		252	4	27	1	–		16	1	295	6
Marseille	1990–91	Division 1	38	8	5	2	–		6 (Note: Appearances in European Cup)	2	49	12
Marseille	1991–92	Division 1	34	5	4	0	–		4	0	42	5
Marseille	1992–93	Division 1	32	4	1	0	–		9 (Note: Appearance in UEFA Champions League)	2	42	6
Marseille	1993–94	Division 1	27	3	3	0	–		–		27	3
Marseille	Total		131	20	17	2	–		19	4	167	26
Rangers	1994–95	Scottish Premier Division	28	2	1	1	1	0	1	0	31	3
Monaco	1995–96	Division 1	11	0	0	0	–		2	0	13	0
Urawa Reds	1996	J1 League	22	2	0	0	10	3	–		32	5
Urawa Reds	1997	J1 League	9	0	0	0	3	0	–		12	0
Urawa Reds	Total		31	2	0	0	13	3	–		44	5
Career total			455	28	45	4	14	3	38	5	552	39

=== International ===
Appearances and goals by national team and year
National team	Year	Apps	Goals
France	1986	4	0
France	1987	5	0
France	1988	7	0
France	1989	1	0
France	1990	8	1
France	1991	6	0
France	1992	11	0
France	1993	3	0
Total		45	1

Scores and results list France's goal tally first, score column indicates score after each Boli goal.

List of international goals scored by Basile Boli
No.	Date	Venue	Opponent	Score	Result	Competition
1	17 November 1990	Qemal Stafa Stadium, Tirana, Albania	Albania	1–0	1–0	UEFA Euro 1992 qualifying

== Honours ==
Auxerre

- Coppa delle Alpi: 1984–85, 1986–87

Marseille

- Division 1: 1990–91, 1991–92
- UEFA Champions League: 1992–93

Rangers

- Scottish Premier Division: 1994–95

Individual

- Division 1 Rookie of the Year: 1984
- Etoile d'Or: 1989
- World Soccer World XI: 1991
- The Dream Team 110 years of OM: 2010

Orders

- Knight of the Legion of Honour: 2008
