= Franck Sauzée =

French footballer (born 1965)

Personal information
- Full name: Franck Gaston Henri Sauzée
- Date of birth: 28 October 1965 (age 60)
- Place of birth: Aubenas, France
- Height: 1.85 m (6 ft 1 in)
- Positions: Midfielder; sweeper

Senior career*
Years	Team	Apps	(Gls)
1983–1988	Sochaux	150	(40)
1988–1990	Marseille	68	(9)
1990–1991	Monaco	28	(7)
1991–1993	Marseille	57	(14)
1993–1994	Atalanta	16	(1)
1994–1996	Strasbourg	57	(9)
1996–1999	Montpellier	49	(9)
1999–2001	Hibernian	77	(13)
Total		502	(102)

International career
1988–1993	France	39	(9)

Managerial career
- 2001–2002: Hibernian
- * Club domestic league appearances and goals

Franck Gaston Henri Sauzée (born 28 October 1965) is a French former professional footballer and manager. Throughout his playing career, he played as either a midfielder or defender, representing the France national team on 39 occasions between 1988 and 1993, scoring nine goals, and captaining the team several times. He achieved great success at club level during the same period, winning the 1993 UEFA Champions League Final and three league titles with Marseille. Later in his career he earned great plaudits for his performances for Scottish club Hibernian, whom Sauzée subsequently managed for a short period. Since ending his active involvement in professional football, Sauzée has worked as a football pundit for French television networks.

== Club career ==
=== Sochaux ===
Born in Aubenas, Ardèche, Sauzée began his professional career with Sochaux, and made his league debut as a 17-year-old in a match against FC Rouen in August 1983. The club were relegated to Ligue 2 in 1987, but won promotion back to Ligue 1 the following season. Sauzee also played in the 1988 Coupe de France Final, which Sochaux lost on penalties to FC Metz, during that promotion season.

=== Marseille (first spell) ===
Sauzée was transferred in 1988 to Marseille, where he enjoyed great success. During his first two-year spell, the club won the French league championship in both seasons and the Coupe de France in 1989.

=== Monaco ===
Sauzée then played for Monaco in one season, 1990–91. He helped the club, who were managed by Arsène Wenger, win the Coupe de France for the second time in Sauzée's career. In his absence, Marseille reached the 1991 European Cup Final, but lost on penalties to Red Star Belgrade.

=== Marseille (second spell) ===
Sauzée returned to Marseille in 1991, and continued to enjoy great success. The club won the 1992 league championship and with it entry to the European Cup, a competition that no French club had ever won. This was to change, however, as Marseille defeated AC Milan 1–0 in the 1993 UEFA Champions League Final. Sauzée had earlier scored a goal in a key group match against Rangers that helped secure their place in the Final. Sauzée was widely noted at this time for his shooting power from midfield, a skill that he used with great effect against Marseille's rivals Paris-Saint Germain in a top-of-the-table clash in May 1993.

The club's success was largely overshadowed by a match fixing scandal. Marseille had also won the 1993 league championship, but were stripped of their title after club president Bernard Tapie was found guilty of bribing one of Marseille's opponents. It also meant that Marseille were not allowed to defend the European Cup the following season.

=== Atalanta ===
The match fixing scandal at Marseille also had the consequence that the squad started to break up, with Sauzée being transferred to Serie A club Atalanta. This spell was unsuccessful, however, as coach Francesco Guidolin was sacked after just 10 games, while Sauzée himself only scored one goal and made 16 appearances. The club eventually finished second bottom of the league and were consequently relegated to Serie B.

=== Hibernian ===
Despite his success in France he is probably most highly regarded by the supporters of Scottish club Hibernian, for whom he was club captain from 1999 until the end of his playing career in 2002. Under his guidance as captain, Hibernian regained their place in the Scottish Premier League and reached the 2001 Scottish Cup Final. Hibs also finished third in the league in 2001, thereby qualifying for the UEFA Cup. He was shortlisted for SPFA Player of the Year in 2001.

Sauzée is an Easter Road legend and is known as "Le God" by the Hibs fans, who voted him as their all time cult hero in a Football Focus poll carried out in 2005. Sauzée particularly enjoyed Edinburgh derby matches against Hearts and was unbeaten in nine derby games as player and manager. (Although Hearts did beat Hibs in a game when Sauzee was absent in May 2000) He scored in the 3–0 "Millennium derby" win at Tynecastle, and he also scored a headed goal in a 3–1 win while being knocked unconscious by an opponent's challenge.

== International career ==
Sauzée won 39 caps for France between 1988 and 1993, scoring nine goals. He served as the captain of the national side in nine of those matches, and played in the 1992 European Championship Finals. He was also part of the France under-21 team that won the 1988 European Championship. What proved to be Sauzée's last match for the France senior team ended in great disappointment, however, as the team were defeated 2–1 by Bulgaria at the Parc des Princes. The defeat meant that France failed to qualify for the 1994 FIFA World Cup, despite the side containing other notable players such as Eric Cantona, Laurent Blanc, Marcel Desailly, Didier Deschamps, David Ginola and Jean-Pierre Papin.

== Managerial career ==
After the departure of manager Alex McLeish to Rangers in December 2001, Sauzée was appointed manager of Hibernian. He was only the second non-Scot to manage the club, and the first since 1919. The appointment came as something of a surprise because the Hibs board of directors had only met the previous day to discuss possible replacements for McLeish. Sauzée, who had been suffering from an achilles tendon injury in the weeks beforehand, announced his retirement from playing in an effort to concentrate on his new job.

His time in charge was unsuccessful. Hibs only won one match in 15, and none in the 2001–02 Scottish Premier League. A win for last-placed club St Johnstone apparently prompted his sacking in February 2002, after 69 days as Hibs manager. After his sacking, Sauzée stated that he had no fear that Hibs would be relegated. This confidence was justified as Hibs defeated St Johnstone 3–0 in Bobby Williamson's first match in charge, and the club comfortably avoided relegation. The extremely brief nature of his tenure meant that it was not proven whether Sauzée would have been a good manager or not. Many Hibs fans, including former player Alan Gordon, wrote to The Scotsman newspaper to voice their disapproval of Hibs' treatment of Sauzée.

In September 2011 Ted Brack's There's Only One Sauzée, a book celebrating Franck Sauzée's time at Hibernian, was published by Black and White Publishing.

== Commentator ==
Sauzée returned to his native France after leaving Hibernian, and has since worked as a football pundit on French television. He initially worked for Canal+, a position he held for six years. Besides providing analysis for televised matches, Sauzée also appeared on a Monday night football talk show. Sauzée left Canal+ in 2008 to take a similar position with Orange, who had acquired rights to cover Ligue 1 matches. In the summer of 2012, he returned to Canal+.

== Career statistics ==
Scores and results list France's goal tally first, score column indicates score after each Sauzée goal.

List of international goals scored by Franck Sauzée
No.	Date	Venue	Opponent	Score	Result	Competition
1	19 November 1988	Partizan Stadium, Belgrade, Yugoslavia	Yugoslavia	2–1	2–3	1990 FIFA World Cup qualiification
2	28 March 1990	Nepstadion, Budapest, Hungary	Hungary	3–1	3–1	Friendly
3	20 February 1991	Parc des Princes, Paris, France	Spain	1–1	3–1	UEFA 1992 Euro qualifying
4	30 March 1991	Parc des Princes, Paris, France	Albania	1–0	5–0	UEFA 1992 Euro qualifying
5	30 March 1991	Parc des Princes, Paris, France	Albania	2–0	5–0	UEFA 1992 Euro qualifying
6	14 August 1991	Stadion Miejski, Poznań, Poland	Poland	1–1	5–1	Friendly
7	28 July 1993	Stade Michel d'Ornano, Caen, France	Russia	1–0	3–1	Friendly
8	22 August 1993	Råsunda Stadium, Stockholm, Sweden	Sweden	1–0	1–1	1994 FIFA World Cup qualification
9	13 October 1993	Parc des Princes, Paris, France	Israel	1–1	2–3	1994 FIFA World Cup qualification

== Honours ==
Sochaux

- Division 2: 1987–88
- Coupe de France runner-up: 1987–88

Marseille

- Division 1: 1988–89, 1989–90, 1991–92
- Coupe de France: 1988–89
- UEFA Champions League: 1992–93

Monaco

- Coupe de France: 1990–91

Strasbourg

- Coupe de France runner-up: 1994–95
- UEFA Intertoto Cup: 1995

Hibernian

- Scottish First Division: 1998–99
- Scottish Cup runner-up: 2000–01

France U21

- UEFA European Under-21 Championship: 1988
