= Jean-Christophe Marquet =

French footballer (born 1974)

Jean-Christophe Marquet (born 27 April 1974) is a French former footballer who played as a defender or midfielder.

== Early life ==
Marquet is a native of Marseille, France, and joined the youth academy of French side Olympique de Marseille at age six.

== Career ==
Marquet started his senior career with French Ligue 1 side Olympique de Marseille, where he played for six years. In 1993, he was loaned to French side Cannes. At age twenty-seven, he retired from professional football due to compartment syndrome.

== Later life ==
After retiring from professional football, Marquet entered local politics.
