= Pascal Olmeta =

French footballer (born 1961)

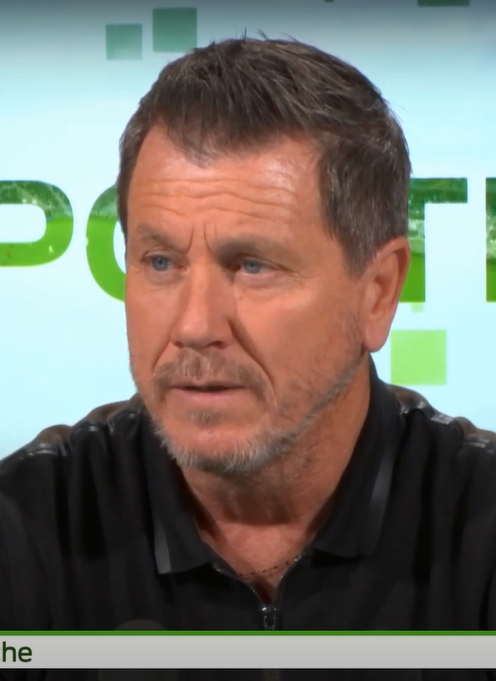
- Olmeta in 2019

Personal information
- Full name: Pascal Olmeta
- Date of birth: 7 April 1961 (age 65)
- Place of birth: Bastia, Haute-Corse, France
- Height: 1.81 m (5 ft 11 in)
- Position: Goalkeeper

Senior career*
| Years | Team | Apps | (Gls) |
| 1980–1981 | INF Vichy | 14 | (0) |
| 1981–1984 | Bastia | 45 | (0) |
| 1984–1986 | Toulon | 76 | (0) |
| 1986–1990 | Matra Racing | 138 | (0) |
| 1990–1993 | Marseille | 84 | (0) |
| 1993–1996 | Lyon | 131 | (2) |
| 1996–1998 | Espanyol | 0 | (0) |
| 1998–1999 | Gazélec Ajaccio | 54 | (0) |
| Total | | 542 | (2) |
- * Club domestic league appearances and goals

Pascal Olmeta (born 7 April 1961) is a French former professional footballer who played as a goalkeeper for Marseille and Lyon in the 1990s.

== Early and personal life ==
Pascal Olmeta was born on 7 April 1961 in Bastia, Haute-Corse.

Olmeta is married with two daughters.

In 2016, Olmeta drew criticism after video footage from 2011 surfaced showing him shooting an elephant in the head before posing "proudly" with the corpse. He defended the footage stating he had shot the animal because of overpopulation in Zimbabwe, and all income from hunting was being used to help local people.

== Honours ==
Marseille

- European Cup/UEFA Champions League: 1992–93; runner-up: 1990–91

Orders

- Knight of the National Order of Merit: 2023

== Participations ==
- 2014 : Cancer, business mortel ?, documentary by Jean-Yves Bilien
