= Jean-Marc Ferreri =

French footballer (born 1962)

Personal information
- Date of birth: 26 December 1962 (age 63)
- Place of birth: Charlieu, France
- Height: 1.72 m (5 ft 8 in)
- Position: Attacking midfielder

Youth career
- 1976–1978: Auxerre

Senior career*
Years	Team	Apps	(Gls)
1978–1986	Auxerre	212	(40)
1986–1991	Bordeaux	169	(34)
1991–1992	Auxerre	26	(9)
1992–1993	Marseille	19	(2)
1993–1994	FC Martigues	16	(2)
1994–1996	Marseille	51	(6)
1996–1997	SC Toulon	32	(17)
1997–1998	FC Zurich	7	(0)
1998	Saint-Denis Saint-Leu	10	(2)
Total		542	(112)

International career
1980	France U18	3	(1)
1982–1983	France U21	4	(1)
1982–1990	France	37	(3)
Medal record
Representing France
FIFA World Cup
Third place	1986
UEFA European Championship
Winner	1984 France
- * Club domestic league appearances and goals

Jean-Marc Ferreri (born 26 December 1962) is a French former professional footballer who played as a midfielder. He earned 37 caps and scored 3 goals for the France national team between 1982 and 1990. He took part in UEFA Euro 1984, where France won the title on home soil, and at the 1986 FIFA World Cup, where France finished third.

== Honours ==
Auxerre

- Division 2: 1979–80

Bordeaux

- Challenge des Champions: 1986
- Division 1: 1986–87
- Coupe de France: 1986–87

Marseille

- UEFA Champions League: 1992–93
- Division 2: 1994–95

France

- UEFA European Championship: 1984
- FIFA World Cup third place: 1986

Individual

- European Cup top scorer: 1987–88
