= List of sporting scandals =

This is a list of major sports scandals.

== American football scandals ==
- Boat Party (2005) – a sex party involving several members of the Minnesota Vikings of the National Football League (NFL)
- National Football League player conduct controversy (2007–present) – various off the field incidents involving American football athletes from the NFL, including Adam "Pacman" Jones, Terry "Tank" Johnson, Chris Henry, Ben Roethlisberger, Ray Rice, Deshaun Watson, and Adrian Peterson, who earned suspensions as a result.
- 2007 New England Patriots videotaping controversy (2007) – the New England Patriots were disciplined for videotaping the opposing team's coach's signals. Coach Bill Belichick was fined $500,000 and the New England Patriots were fined $250,000 and lost their 2008 1st-round draft pick.
- New Orleans Saints bounty scandal (2012) – the NFL discovered that the New Orleans Saints had operated a secret slush fund from 2009 to 2011 that paid "bounties" to defensive players for big plays during games, most controversially for injuring opponents. The scheme was allegedly organized by a number of players plus defensive coordinator Gregg Williams, with the acquiescence of head coach Sean Payton. Shortly after the investigation came to light, Williams was accused of running similar schemes while he was defensive coordinator of the Houston Oilers/Tennessee Titans and Washington Redskins, as well as the head coach of the Buffalo Bills. The league suspended Williams indefinitely and Payton for one year and suspended the Saints' general manager and another assistant for parts of the 2012 season. Jonathan Vilma, a Saints player who had a major role in the scheme and reportedly offered a $10,000 bounty on Brett Favre, was suspended for the entire season and three other players were suspended for parts of the season. However, in September 2012, an arbitrator overturned the suspensions of the players involved in the affair. Williams' suspension ultimately lasted one year.
- Deflategate (2015) – during the AFC Championship Game, 11 of the 12 footballs under the Patriots' control during the first half were found to be inflated below the level mandated by the rulebook. The case was then closed because of the referees' failure to check the balls prior to the game. Tom Brady was suspended by the NFL for the first 4 games of the 2016 season.

== Association football scandals ==
- 1915 British football match-fixing scandal
- 1964 British football match-fixing scandal
- Bundesliga scandal (1965)
- 1971 Bundesliga scandal
- 1980 Italian football scandal – a match fixing scandal in Italian football involving several major teams.
- 1986 Totonero
- 1988 Mexico national football team scandal
- 1989 Maracanazo of the Chilean team
- 1993 French football bribery scandal – a match fixing scandal involving a 1992–93 French Division 1 match between Olympique de Marseille and Valenciennes, in which Valenciennes players were bribed by Olympique de Marseille president Bernard Tapie, through Marseille midfielder Jean-Jacques Eydelie. It is believed that Eydelie offered three Valenciennes players (Jorge Burruchaga, Christophe Robert and Jacques Glassman) ₣250,000 to "take the foot off of the gas" in a May 20 match between the sides, so that the team would be fresh to play in the Champions League final soon after. Marseille were subsequently stripped off the 1992–93 French Division 1 title, relegated to Division 2 and handed bans from all 1993 UEFA competitions. The French Football Federation also suspended Eydelie, Robert and Burruchaga, whilst Tapie was replaced as club president by Bernard Moreau. Tapie received a prison sentence of over two years, of which he served six months and received a ₣20,000 fine, whilst Eydelie, Robert, Burruchaga and Marseille general manager Jean-Pierre Bernès were all given prison sentences and fined. Eydelie's prison sentence was a suspended sentence.
- 1994 Malaysian football scandal
- 1999 Chinese football match-fixing scandal
- 2001 Chinese football match-fixing scandal
- 2003–2009 Chinese football match-fixing scandals
- Apito Dourado (2004) – a match fixing scandal in Portuguese football involving FC Porto, Boavista, and União de Leiria.
- Bundesliga scandal (2005) – a match fixing scandal in German football centering on disgraced referee Robert Hoyzer.
- Caso Genoa (2005)
- Brazilian football match-fixing scandal (2005) – a match fixing scandal involving referees in Brazil.
- 2006 Calciopoli scandal – a match fixing scandal in Italian football involving several major teams, including three of the country's four qualifiers to the 2006–07 UEFA Champions League.
- In the Commonwealth of Independent States Cup 2006, the Armenian champion Pyunik refused to play with an Azerbaijani team, PFC Neftchi. The team Pyunik defeated the Ukrainian team Shakhtar Donetsk 3–1 in the quarter-final, when it already knew that in case of victory they would have to play against Neftchi. After the match, they told the referee they would not play against an Azerbaijani team and later that evening left Moscow on an airplane. The Russian Football Union gave Shakhtar Donetsk a technical victory 3–0 so they could play in the half-final instead of Pyunik, but Shakhtar Donetsk declined the offer stating that "[W]e would really want to play in the half-final, but we don't want to get there by any other way then sport". Eventually, because no one could play against Neftchi in the half-final, Neftchi were right away promoted to the final, where they defeated the Lithuanian club Kaunas 4–2.
- 2009 European football match-fixing scandal
- 2011 Turkish sports corruption scandal – in July 2011, as part of a major match-fixing investigation by authorities in Turkey, nearly 60 people suspected to be involved with fixing games were detained by Istanbul Police Department Organized Crime Control Bureau and then arrested by the court. In June 2014, retrial process has started for all the convicted people.
- 2011–12 Italian football match-fixing scandal
- 2013 Lebanese match fixing scandal – in 2013, Lebanese footballers, Ramez Dayoub (playing for Selangor FA) and Mahmoud El Ali (playing for Persiba Balikpapan), were banned for life by the Lebanese Football Association for participating in match-fixing scandals. 22 players were investigated for this.
- 2013 English football match-fixing scandal
- 2015 Greek football scandal – it emerged on 6 April 2015, when prosecutor Aristidis Korreas' 173-page work was revealed. Telephone tapping operated by the National Intelligence Service of Greece has played a significant role in the case. According to the prosecutor's conclusion, Olympiakos. owner Evangelos Marinakis along with Greek Football Federation members Theodoros Kouridis, Aristidis Stathopoulos and Georgios Sarris were suspected of directing a criminal organization since 2011. The goal behind their scheme was to "absolutely control Greek football's fate by the methods of blackmailing and fraud". Referees, judges, football directors and chairmen were also involved in the scandal, but all defendants deny charges. Olympiakos were the champions of the Greek Super League at the time.
- 2015 FIFA corruption case
- 2015 Italian football match-fixing scandal
- 2016 United Kingdom football sexual abuse scandal
- 2017 Rangers Tax Fraud Case. The Supreme court ruled that money paid to players, managers and directors between 2001 and 2010 was in the form of tax free loans. This totalled £47m
- 2018 Football Leaks - Der Spiegel and the European Investigative Collaborations (EIC) network of journalists, begun publishing various articles relateding to various dirty deals relating to various dodgy deals behind Arab oil owned football clubs Manchester City, PSG, and Russian owned Monaco. Super League plans by current European powerhouses. Questionable dealings of football agents, Doping involving Russian and Spanish players.
- 2023 Brazilian football match-fixing scandal
- 2025 Turkish football betting scandal
- Age fraud in association football
- 2026 Manchester City F.C. financial breaches scandal: the club is found guilty on 114 of 115 charges from the initial leaks.

== Athletics scandals ==
- 1980 Boston Marathon Rosie Ruiz cheating scandal

== Baseball scandals ==
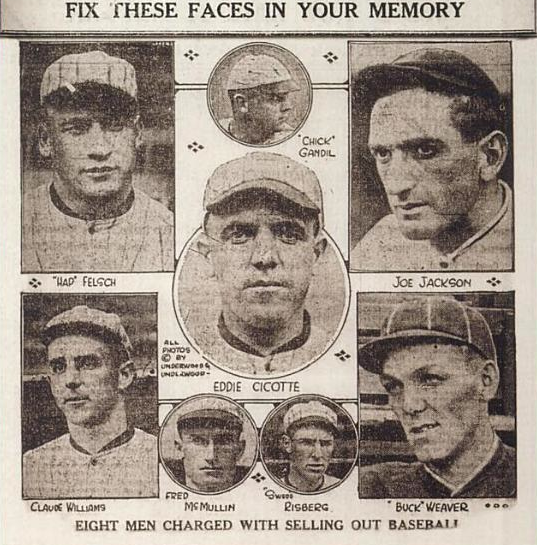
A cartoon ran by various newspapers in 1920 after the breaking of the Black Sox Scandal

- Black Sox Scandal (1919)
- Pete Rose gambling on baseball – Dowd Report (1989)
- Houston Astros sign stealing scandal
- For baseball doping scandals, see the "Doping scandals" section.

== Basketball scandals ==
- 2007 NBA betting scandal
- 2025 NBA illegal gambling prosecution

== Boxing scandals ==
- List of deaths due to injuries sustained in boxing
- In 1967, then-undefeated World Champion Muhammad Ali was stripped of his title, and denied a boxing license for the next 3 years over his refusal to be drafted into the U.S. army.
- In 1983, boxer Luis Resto was caught tampering with his gloves by removing padding and hardening his hand wraps with plaster.
- In 2001, International Boxing Federation founder Robert W. "Bobby" Lee Sr. was convicted of money laundering and tax evasion, following a three-year long investigation of racketeering and bribery at the organization.
- Tampered handwraps controversy of 2009 resulting in the suspension of Antonio Margarito
- Suspension of boxing judges at the 2016 Summer Olympics - see Boxing at the 2016 Summer Olympics#Judging

== College sporting scandals ==
- 1951 college basketball point-shaving scandal – in 1951, more than 30 players at seven schools were implicated in a point shaving scheme that also had connections to organized crime. The scandal was most strongly linked to the City College of New York because several central figures had played on the school's 1949–50 team that won that season's NCAA tournament and NIT, but it has also been strongly linked to six other universities, including Long Island University, Bradley University, and the University of Kentucky as well.
- Boston College basketball point shaving scandal in 1978–79
- 1985 Tulane University basketball point-shaving scandal
- Southern Methodist University football scandal – in 1986, it was revealed that Southern Methodist University boosters gave football players thousands of dollars from a "slush fund" with the knowledge of university administrators. Along with a string of prior NCAA violations, this led the NCAA to level the "death penalty" on the school's football team.
- University of Michigan basketball scandal – four players, most notably Chris Webber, were paid by a booster to launder money from his gambling operations. In some cases, the payments extended to their high school days.
- University of Minnesota basketball scandal – the St. Paul Pioneer Press reported the day before the 1999 NCAA Division I men's basketball tournament that an academic counseling staffer at the university publicly acknowledged doing coursework for many basketball players.
- Baylor University basketball scandal – player Patrick Dennehy was murdered by teammate Carlton Dotson. Later, coach Dave Bliss instructed his players to lie to NCAA investigators that Dennehy dealt drugs. In the wake of these events, numerous violations of NCAA rules were discovered.
- Duke lacrosse case – a stripper hired by members of the Duke University men's lacrosse team for an informal team party in 2006 falsely accused three players of rape.
- University of North Carolina at Chapel Hill football scandal – over ten football players received improper benefits and committed academic fraud by turning in coursework prepared by tutors.
- 2011 University of Miami athletics scandal – Yahoo! Sports broke a story in which former Miami booster Nevin Shapiro, currently imprisoned for running a Ponzi scheme, indicated he had provided massive amounts of improper benefits to Miami players and coaches, mostly in football, but also in men's basketball.
- Penn State child sex abuse scandal – in November 2011, former Penn State defensive coordinator Jerry Sandusky was arrested on 40 counts of sexually abusing eight boys over a 15-year period including incidents in Penn State's football facilities. In June 2012, Sandusky was convicted on 45 charges related to the scandal.
- University of North Carolina academic-athletic scandal – in a follow-up to the UNC football scandal, new accusations of academic fraud arose in relation to the university's African and Afro-American Studies department and men's basketball program, men's football team, women's soccer and other sports as well. The Wainstein Report, an independent report commissioned by UNC, revealed academic fraud that occurred over at least 18 years involving thousands of students and student athletes. Allegedly, thousands of student athletes were directed by the UNC administration to take "sham" classes in order to maintain eligibility. UNC avoided major NCAA penalties, mainly because said sham classes had been offered to the entire student body.
- Western Kentucky University swim team hazing scandal – In January 2015, a former member of Western Kentucky University's swim team alleged several incidents of hazing while part of the team. Further investigations revealed hazing incidents dating back to at least 2012, prompting the university to suspend the entire swimming and diving program for five years. As of 2024, the program has not been revived.
- 2015 University of Louisville basketball sex scandal – In 2015, Yahoo! Sports reported that a self-described former madam alleged that she had been paid several thousand dollars from 2010 to 2014 by men's basketball staffer Andre McGee for strip shows and sex parties for players and prospective recruits. The NCAA announced the results of its investigation in June 2017, announcing major sanctions that included a 10-year show-cause penalty for McGee and the potential loss of the team's 2013 national title. An appeal by Louisville failed, and in February 2018 the Cardinals became the first Division I basketball program to be stripped of a national championship.
- Baylor University sexual assault scandal – in 2016, Baylor and its football program were rocked by the revelation that university officials failed to act on numerous alleged sexual and non-sexual assaults by football team members between 2012 and 2016, with one player convicted of felony sexual assault. A later lawsuit filed by a group of victims alleged that 31 football players committed 52 rapes between 2011 and 2014. In the wake of the scandal, head football coach Art Briles was fired, athletic director Ian McCaw resigned, and university president Ken Starr was first demoted and then resigned.
- 2017–18 NCAA Division I men's basketball corruption scandal – An ongoing FBI investigation into corruption in NCAA men's basketball that has so far resulted in the arrest of 10 individuals, including college assistant coaches from Arizona, Auburn, Oklahoma State, and USC plus high-ranking executives of sports apparel giant Adidas. Other programs initially implicated in the scandal included Louisville, Miami (FL), and South Carolina. Louisville placed head coach Rick Pitino and athletic director Tom Jurich (the latter not directly involved in the scandal) on administrative leave, and soon fired both. Further revelations in February 2018 saw more than a dozen additional programs possibly implicated.

== Cricket scandals ==
- Underarm bowling incident of 1981 - Australia's Trevor Chappell became very infamous when Australia played New Zealand at the MCG on February 1, 1981, Australian captain Greg Chappell instructed the bowler (and younger brother Trevor) to bowl the last ball underarm to New Zealand batsmen Brian McKechnie to prevent him from hitting a six. After the bowl, McKechnie threw his bat onto the ground in disgust and Australia won the match. Negative post reactions then occurred after the match. Trevor Chappell was best remembered for the incident.
- John the bookmaker controversy – a scandal in which Australia's Mark Waugh and Shane Warne were paid in 1994–95 to provide information on pitch and weather conditions to an Indian bookmaker. The scandal came to light in 1998.
- South Africa cricket match fixing in 2000 which resulted in the banning from cricket of Hansie Cronje
- Ball tampering controversy in August 2006 - On August 20, 2006, when Pakistan toured England in the fourth test, the umpires Darrell Hair and Billy Doctrove ruled that the Pakistani team had been ball tampering and gave five penalty runs to England then offered them a new ball. After the tea break, Pakistan refused to take the field in protest at the decision. Thus, England won the match by forfeit. After the incident, the whole Pakistan team were busted of the scandal and umpire Darrell Hair was banned from umpiring in cricket.
- Pakistan cricket spot-fixing scandal – in 2010, three Pakistan players—team captain Salman Butt, Mohammad Asif and Mohammad Amir—were accused of involvement in a spot-fixing scheme in which they allegedly accepted large sums of money to influence specific events within a match, as opposed to an actual match result. After an investigation, the ICC banned all three from the sport for periods from 5 to 10 years. Later, Butt and Asif were tried in a London court and found guilty of charges related to the scheme, whilst Amir pleaded guilty to similar charges in the same court. All received prison sentences ranging from 6 to 30 months.
- 2013 Indian Premier League spot-fixing and betting case
- 2018 Australian ball-tampering scandal - In 2018, When Australia toured South Africa, Australia's Cameron Bancroft was seen on camera rubbing the ball with a small yellow object then hid the object in his underwear. The umpires then ruled he was ball tampering. It was then found that Australian captain Steve Smith and vice captain David Warner were also found to have been involved in the incident. Smith and Warner were then banned for 12 months from international and domestic cricket while Bancroft was banned for 9 months. Smith was also temporarily banned from captaining Australia while Warner received a life ban from captaining.
- 2018 Sri Lankan cricket pitch fixing and betting scandal

== Doping scandals ==
- Doping in sport
- Ben Johnson's positive test for steroids after his 1988 Olympic victory in the 100 metres
- The Festina affair – a series of doping investigations and scandals surrounding the 1998 Tour de France, initially focusing on the Festina cycling team, but quickly spreading to several other teams.
- The Mitchell Report – 88 current and former Major League Baseball (MLB) players were alleged to have used steroids or other performance-enhancing drugs.
- The conviction of Barry Bonds (2011) – later overturned on obstruction of justice charges relating to the BALCO investigation
- Operación Puerto (2006) – a Spanish investigation into a doping scheme allegedly involving many top cyclists, including several potential contenders in the 2006 Tour de France.
- Floyd Landis doping case (2006) – Floyd Landis, initially the winner of the 2006 Tour de France, tested positive for synthetic testosterone and was stripped of his title.
- Doping at the 2007 Tour de France – the 2007 Tour de France was rocked by a series of doping scandals. Two riders, including pre-race favorite Alexander Vinokourov, were disqualified for doping offenses. Both teams involved pulled out of the Tour. A third rider, who had abandoned the Tour after a crash, was revealed to have tested positive for testosterone before the Tour. The race leader, Michael Rasmussen, was removed from the Tour by his team with four stages left amid questions surrounding his possible involvement in doping.
- Lance Armstrong doping case (2012) – after having been accused of doping for much of the latter part of his career, Lance Armstrong became the subject of an investigation by the United States Anti-Doping Agency. The USADA report revealed that he had engaged in a highly sophisticated doping campaign from 1998 onward. Following the report, the UCI stripped all of Armstrong's results and awards from that time forward, including his then-record seven Tour de France wins.
- Biogenesis baseball scandal (2013) – more than a dozen MLB players were found to have received PEDs, mainly human growth hormone, from a now-defunct anti-aging clinic in the Miami area. In all, 13 players received suspensions of 50 or more games, with the longest being given to Alex Rodriguez (162 games) and Ryan Braun (65 games). The number of players suspended is the most for any single incident in the history of organized baseball in North America.
- Essendon Football Club supplements saga (2013) – in February 2013, the Essendon Football Club, a professional Australian rules football club participating in the Australian Football League (AFL), were investigated by the Australian Sports Anti-Doping Authority (ASADA) and the World Anti-Doping Agency (WADA) over the legality of its supplements program during the 2012 AFL season and the preceding preseason. In January 2016, the players were found guilty of having used the banned peptide thymosin beta-4, resulting in the suspensions of thirty-four players who were part of the program.
- Cronulla-Sutherland Sharks supplements saga (2013) – in February 2013, the Cronulla-Sutherland Sharks, a professional rugby league team participating in the National Rugby League (NRL), were investigated by the ASADA and the WADA over the legality of its supplements program during the preseason and the regular 2011 NRL season. In August 2014, the players were found guilty of having used the banned peptide CJC-1295, resulting in the suspensions of fourteen players who were part of the program.

== Skating scandals ==
=== Figure skating scandals ===
- Attack on Nancy Kerrigan - Nancy Kerrigan was attacked after a practice session at the 1994 U.S. Figure Skating Championships. Kerrigan's main team competitor, Tonya Harding, was accused of being involved in the attack.
- Kamila Valieva's failed drug test - Kamila Valieva failed a drug test for a banned heart medication in December 2021. This drug test result only surfaced after the figure skating team event in the 2022 Beijing Olympic Games, in which she competed for the ROC. Despite the result of the drug test, Kamila Valieva was cleared to skate in the Beijing 2022 singles event by the Court of Arbitration for Sport the following week, as she was considered a protected person due to being only 15 years of age. This decision was highly controversial and has resulted in the minimum age for competing in the Olympic Games for figure skating to rise from 15 years of age to 17 years of age.

=== Short track speed skating scandals ===
- Cho Jae-beom was convicted for 10.5 years in jail in January 2021 of sexual abuse of multiple Olympic gold medalist Shim Suk-hee.

== Gliding scandals ==
- During the 2020 Women's World Gliding Championships at Lake Keepit, Australia, the home team captain Terry Cubley (Executive Officer of the GFA) was charged with unsporting behaviour for hacking the official tracking system to bypass the mandatory 15 minute delay and forward real time competitors' positions to his team, granting a tactical advantage. An investigation revealed that Matt Gage had been closely involved with the developers of the tracking system, and was aware of an undocumented back door that allowed the team captain (Terry Cubley) to bypass the 15 minute delay. This real-time information was relayed by the team captain over the radio to the Australian pilots. This was the first time in the sport's history that an entire team had been penalised for unsporting behaviour, with the Competition Director applying a penalty of 25 points per pilot per day. Controversially the pilots involved were spared disqualification only receiving a relatively trivial points reduction (compared to a competing pilot who was disqualified for infringing airspace earlier in the competition). Following a subsequent GFA investigation two of the Australian Team admitted to cheating and the GFA made a formal apology to the FAI and the wider gliding community. Terry Cubley was removed from his role as Vice President of the IGC, but chose to remain as Executive Officer of the GFA . The pilots involved chose to appeal against this decision, resulting in the longest and most comprehensive investigation in the FAIs history. The final judgement described the actions of the pilots as ‘reprehensible’, increased the penalty to disqualification and removed their flights from the competition record. The Appeal Tribunal also recommended the FAI to take further disciplinary action against those involved. Following the Tribunals verdict Lisa Turner (the Australian pilots’ representative to the tribunal) issued a press release re-iterating their denial of cheating, accused the tribunal of bias against the Australian team and announced a further appeal to the Court of Arbitration for Sport CAS.

== Golf scandals ==
- Jane Blalock cheating controversy – one of the LPGA Tour's top players, Jane Blalock, was accused of illegally marking her golf ball on the green. She was suspended and fined by the tour, but Blalock in turn filed suit and won an injunction that allowed her to continue playing. Blalock eventually won her lawsuit and she and the LPGA reached an out-of-court settlement.
- Vijay Singh, a former number one golfer in the world, was suspended from the PGA Tour for using deer antler spray, which violated the PGA Tour Anti-Doping Policy. Likewise in 1985, Vijay Singh was caught erasing his score on a hole and replacing it with a lower score after the scorecard had been signed. Once the rules officials confirmed the allegations, Singh was banned from the Asian Tour. To this day, Singh has not acknowledged that he cheated.

== Gymnastics scandals ==
- Age controversies in gymnastics
- USA Gymnastics sex abuse scandal – former USA Gymnastics national team doctor, Larry Nassar, was accused of sexual abuse by more than 150 girls and women. Nassar was sentenced to 60 years in prison on federal child pornography charges in December 2017, and was sentenced to 80 to 300 years in prison after two separate trials on sexual assault charges in January 2018, to be served consecutively.

== Horse racing scandals ==
- Show jumping horse killings – from 1975 to 1995, wealthy owners and trainers of show jumping horses conspired to electrocute and otherwise kill over-valued as well as under-performing animals in a 20-year-long scheme to defraud insurance companies. Crimes also committed during this equestrian sports scandal include extortion, mail fraud, animal cruelty and the murder of at least one human being.
- Fine Cotton/Bold Personality ring-in – a 1984 betting scam in which the conspirators, which included some elite figures in Australian Thoroughbred racing, substituted the far more talented Bold Personality for Fine Cotton in a low-class race. The scheme was discovered immediately after the race and the investigation led to lifetime bans for six individuals and bans of more than a decade for at least two more.
- 2020 Horse racing doping scam – the scam was revealed in March 2020, when the FBI cracked down several top names in American horse racing. Initially, 27 people (trainers and veterinarians) were charged with doping, which later increased to 29 people.

== Ice hockey scandals ==
- Operation Slapshot (2006) – investigation into a gambling ring allegedly operated by National Hockey League assistant coach Rick Tocchet.
- Chicago Blackhawks Sexual Assault Scandal (2010) - Kyle Beach, former NHL player, was sexually assaulted by then assistant coach Brad Aldrich during the 2009-10 Chicago Blackhawks season. Even though the incident was known by the front office, no actions were taken to provide Beach with a proper care and recovery. The scandal was under the radar for almost a decade when Beach decided to formally expose the incident.

== Match-fixing scandals ==
- Ten of the twelve members of the gold medal-winning Spanish basketball team at the 2000 Summer Paralympics were revealed to have no disability.
- Fresno Case scandal (2004) – an attempt to rig a vote to prevent the Catalan rink hockey team from being accepted into international competition.
- Melbourne Football Club tanking scandal (2009) – allegations arose that the club deliberately lost matches in 2009 so that it would put itself into a position whereby they would secure a priority draft pick at that year's draft.
- In 2011, snooker player John Higgins was accused of accepting bribery in order to lose frames purposefully. Higgins denied any accusations of match-fixing and bribery, however, he was found guilty of accepting bribery while there was no evidence for him match-fixing. "World number one John Higgins has been suspended from all future tournaments after reportedly agreeing to take a £261,000 bribe to lose frames."
- Match fixing in tennis
- 1964 British football match-fixing scandal
- 1971 Bundesliga scandal
- Match-fixing investigations of Norwegian Second Division
- Match fixing in English football
- Match fixing in Romanian football

== Motorsport and racing scandals ==
- 1994 Formula One cheating controversy – a number of allegations of cheating were thrown during the 1994 Formula One season, particularly to the Benetton team.
- 2007 NASCAR Gatorade Duel scandal – three various incidents related to the Gatorade Duel.
- 2007 Formula One espionage controversy, commonly known as Spygate – an incident in which Scuderia Ferrari mechanic Nigel Stepney passed on a secret document to Mike Coughlan of McLaren.
- 2008 race fixing controversy, also known as Crashgate – it was surrounded by allegations in Formula One that driver Nelson Piquet Jr. deliberately crashed in the 2008 Singapore Grand Prix to help his Renault teammate Fernando Alonso win. Felipe Massa is pursuing legal action against Formula One Management, the FIA and Bernie Ecclestone for a sum of £64m over Crashgate as he believes the FIA should have voided all points awarded in the Singapore Grand Prix, which would have led to him being 2008 World Champion. A High Court of justice in London has ruled that the case can now go to trial.
- 2013 Federated Auto Parts 400 – in the final Sprint Cup race, before the field was set for the 2013 Chase for the Sprint Cup, three teams—Michael Waltrip Racing, Penske Racing and Front Row Motorsports—were found to have extensively manipulated the race finish in an attempt to secure Chase places for MWR driver Martin Truex Jr. and Penske driver Joey Logano.
- 2019 Ford EcoBoost 400 – in the final race of the 2019 Monster Energy NASCAR Cup Series, three teams – Premium Motorsports, Spire Motorsports and Rick Ware Racing – were found to have manipulated the race finish by parking their cars in order to allow the No. 27 team to score more points, passing the Gaunt Brothers Racing No. 96 in the standings to obtain an end of season cash bonus.

== Olympic Games scandals ==
- 2002 Winter Olympic bid scandal – a number of IOC members were forced to resign after it was uncovered that they had accepted inappropriately valuable "gifts" in return for voting for Salt Lake City to hold the Games.
- 2002 Winter Olympics figure skating scandal – dual gold medals were awarded in pairs figure skating to Canadian pair Jamie Salé and David Pelletier, as well as to Russian pair Elena Berezhnaya and Anton Sikharulidze, after allegations of collusion among judges.
- Lochtegate – four United States swimmers at the 2016 Summer Olympics including Ryan Lochte were involved in a scandal around an accusation being victims of armed robbery, which ultimately concluded with fines, loss of sponsorships, and statements of apology from the swimmers and various oversight organizations.
- Russian doping scandal – Russia has the most (51) Olympic medals stripped for doping violations – four times the number of the second country (Belarus). From 2011 to 2015, more than a thousand Russian competitors in various sports, including summer, winter, and Paralympic sports, benefited from a cover-up with no indication that the program has ceased since then.

== Paralympic Games ==
- Cheating at the Paralympic Games – in the 2000 Summer Paralympics, athletes from Spain competed and won the gold medal in the Basketball ID event despite the majority of players not having an intellectual disability. The fallout from this scandal saw all events for athletes with intellectual disabilities removed from the next two Summer Paralympics.

== Rugby league scandals ==
- Melbourne Storm salary cap breach – in 2010, the Melbourne Storm were punished for breaching the salary cap and were stripped of the ability to accumulate points, had their name stripped from the premierships and minor premierships they had gained over the previous four years and forced to pay back millions of dollars of prize money. It is the toughest punishment for a salary cap breach in NRL history.
- Cronulla Sharks supplements doping scandal – following an extensive investigation by ASADA, players from the Cronulla Sharks were found guilty of having used the banned peptide CJC-1295, resulting in the suspensions of fourteen players. A number of senior staff were dismissed or resigned and several senior club members received penalties and suspensions.
- Matthew Johns sexual assault allegations – in 2002, while on a trip to New Zealand, Cronulla-Sutherland Sharks player Matthew Johns took part in degrading group sex with a young woman while up to 11 of his teammates joined in. The scandal was reported by the ABC's Four Corners TV series. Johns admitted having consensual sex with the girl and made a public apology on Channel Nine's The Footy Show. Johns was suspended from The Footy Show and was released by the Melbourne Storm as their assistant coach.

== Rugby union scandals ==
- Grannygate – scandal in March 2000 over the eligibility of Shane Howarth and Brett Sinkinson representing the Wales national team
- Kamp Staaldraad – controversial training camp for the Springboks (South Africa's national rugby union team) before the 2003 Rugby World Cup
- "Bloodgate" – a scheme by the English rugby union club Harlequins to fake an injury to wing Tom Williams to allow a blood replacement to be brought on at a critical moment in their 2009 Heineken Cup quarterfinal against Leinster. The scheme, which included deliberately cutting Williams' mouth open after the match in order to cover up the fake injury, ultimately led to Quins head coach Dean Richards being banned from the sport for three years.

== Sumo wrestling scandals ==
- Tokitsukaze stable hazing scandal (2007)
- Match Fixing Scandal (2011)
- Harumafuji Scandal (2017)

== Tennis scandals ==
- Betting patterns on Nikolay Davydenko during a match with Martin Vassallo Arguello indicated corruption.
- Match fixing in tennis

== Volleyball scandals ==
- Rick Butler sexual abuse allegations
