= Miroslav Blažević =

Bosnian and Croatian footballer and manager (1935–2023)

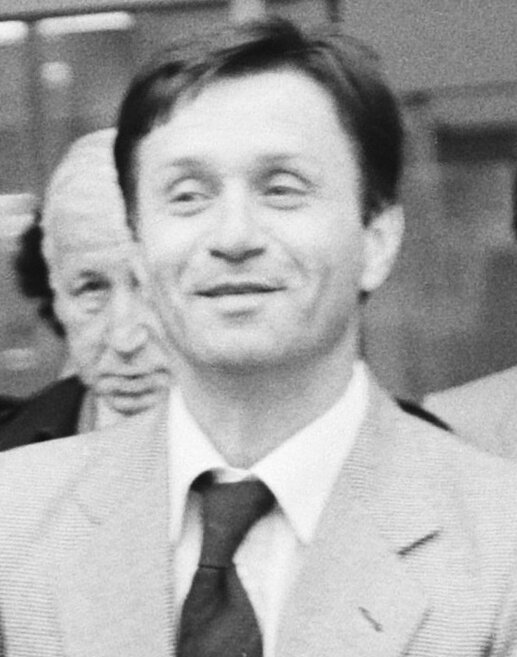
- Blažević in 1978

Personal information
- Date of birth: 9 February 1935
- Place of birth: Travnik, Kingdom of Yugoslavia
- Date of death: 8 February 2023 (aged 87)
- Place of death: Zagreb, Croatia
- Position: Right winger

Youth career
- Travnik

Senior career*
Years	Team	Apps	(Gls)
1954–1955	Dinamo Zagreb	0	(0)
1955–1957	Lokomotiva Zagreb	4	(0)
1957–1959	Sarajevo	14	(0)
1959–1963	Rijeka	48	(4)
1964–1965	Servette	3	(2)
1965–1966	Moutier		
1966–1968	Sion	41	(1)

Managerial career
- 1968–1971: Vevey
- 1971–1976: Sion
- 1976: Switzerland
- 1976–1979: Lausanne-Sport
- 1979–1980: Rijeka
- 1980–1983: Dinamo Zagreb
- 1983–1985: Grasshopper
- 1985: Priština
- 1986–1988: Dinamo Zagreb
- 1988–1991: Nantes
- 1991–1992: PAOK
- 1992–1994: Croatia Zagreb
- 1994–2000: Croatia
- 2001: Iran
- 2002: Osijek
- 2002–2003: Dinamo Zagreb
- 2003: Mura
- 2003–2005: Varteks
- 2005: Hajduk Split
- 2005–2006: Neuchâtel Xamax
- 2006–2008: Zagreb
- 2008–2009: Bosnia and Herzegovina
- 2009–2010: Shanghai Shenhua
- 2010–2011: China U-23
- 2011–2012: Mes Kerman
- 2012–2013: Zagreb
- 2014: Sloboda Tuzla
- 2014–2015: Zadar
Medal record
Men's football
Representing Croatia (as manager)
FIFA World Cup
Bronze medal – third place	1998 France
- * Club domestic league appearances and goals

Miroslav "Ćiro" Blažević (Croatian pronunciation: [mîroslaʋ tɕǐːro blǎːʒeʋitɕ]; 9 February 1935 – 8 February 2023) was a Bosnian and Croatian professional football manager and player. A former right winger, his professional playing career spanned from 1954 to 1966, during which he played for Dinamo Zagreb, Lokomotiva Zagreb, Sarajevo, Rijeka as well as Swiss clubs Sion and Moutier.

As a manager, his most successful period was with the Croatia national team, which he led to the quarter-finals in the 1996 European Championship and won third place at the 1998 FIFA World Cup. He went on to manage the following national teams: Switzerland, Iran, Bosnia and Herzegovina and China Olympic. Blažević also had successful spells at Vevey, Sion, Lausanne-Sport, Rijeka, Dinamo Zagreb, Grasshopper Zürich, Priština, Osijek, Varteks, Zagreb, Shanghai Shenhua and Sloboda Tuzla.

From 29 March 1993 to 23 February 1995, he was president of Dinamo Zagreb. Blažević's public persona and managerial career has him known as trener svih trenera (the "coach of all coaches") within Southeast Europe.

== Early life ==
Blažević was born to a Bosnian Croat family in Travnik, Kingdom of Yugoslavia (in present-day Bosnia and Herzegovina) on 9 February 1935. However, his parents did not register his birth until the next day, resulting in his official birthday being listed as 10 February. He was the youngest of eight children. In his teens he trained in skiing.

== Playing career ==
Blažević began his youth career in local team NK Travnik, after which he moved to Zagreb and joined Dinamo Zagreb. His career as a player was, by his own admission, average; therefore, he began his coaching career at a relatively early age. As a player, he played for Dinamo Zagreb, Lokomotiva Zagreb, Rijeka, Sarajevo, and Sion. He also played for Moutier, gaining promotion to LNA in 1966.

== Managerial career ==
=== Coaching in Switzerland ===
Blažević started as a coach when he ended his playing days in Switzerland. He first led FC Vevey (1968–71) then his former team FC Sion (1971–76), FC Lausanne-Sport (1976–79) and finally Switzerland's national team (as interim coach for two games in 1976). With Sion he won the Swiss Cup with club as a player and as manager in 1974.

=== NK Rijeka ===
Blažević returned to Yugoslavia in 1979 to coach Rijeka. Rijeka finished tenth in the 1979–80 season. Although not a very good league season the club got to the quarter-finals of 1979–80 European Cup Winners' Cup where they lost to Juventus. NK Rijeka's best European placement. Blažević also lost the 1979–80 Balkans Cup final to Studențesc București.

=== Success with Dinamo ===
Blažević took over Dinamo Zagreb on 11 December 1980, one of Yugoslavia's big four clubs (the other three being Hajduk Split, Red Star Belgrade and Partizan) in 1980. After a mediocre first season, in which Dinamo finished fifth, Blažević became an instant club legend in the 1981–82, winning the first Yugoslav league title for the Zagreb outfit after a 24-year drought.

Next year, Dinamo won the Yugoslav Cup and led a long battle with Partizan and Hajduk Split in the league. Partizan became 1983 champions and Blažević left Dinamo for the first time.

=== Grasshopper and Priština ===
Blažević went back to Switzerland, winning the Swiss Championship with Grasshopper-Club Zurich in 1984. He advanced to the second round of 1984–85 European Cup where he lost to Juventus. After a less than expected second season Blažević left Grasshopper mid-season.

In 1985, Blažević was once again in Yugoslavia, this time as manager of Priština. Under Blažević's leadership Priština achieved First Division status. To this day he is noted as a club legend.

=== Second stint at Dinamo, Nantes and PAOK ===
In the same year he became Dinamo Zagreb's coach for second time; during this period he failed to accomplish any significant results and therefore left again in 1988. His next team was FC Nantes of France; Blažević was there until 1990. After Nantes he spent a season in Greek club PAOK FC.

=== Croatia tenure ===
In the 1990s, with Croatia gaining independence, Blažević joined the Croatian Democratic Union (HDZ) and became President Tuđman's admirer and close friend. For the third time he became Dinamo (then named NK Croatia Zagreb) coach and president at the same time. He won the 1993 Croatian Championship and 1994 Croatian Cup, but then left his favorite club once more, citing his reasons for doing so as needing to focus on managing the Croatia national team.

Blažević was national team manager from 1994 on a part-time basis, but only a year later it became a full-time job as Croatia faced its first qualifying cycle for the European Championship. Croatia won the first place in qualifying group, sensationally ahead of Italy and directly entered Euro 96 in England. Blažević was about to gain some worldwide fame.

From January to June 1996 Blažević took up a position as an advisor at HNK Rijeka to help newly appointed coach Nenad Gračan save his former club from relegation.

Croatia passed group stage with wins against Turkey and current European champions Denmark and loss to Portugal, to face Germany in quarter-finals. Germany won 2–1 and eventually went on to win the event.

However, greatest things lay ahead, as Croatia was trying to qualify to the 1998 FIFA World Cup in France. They won second place in the qualifying group behind Denmark and ousted Ukraine in a play-off for the tournament.

Blažević's Croatia squad for the 1998 World Cup included the likes of Zvonimir Boban, Davor Šuker and Slaven Bilić. In France they created one of the greatest all-time World Cup sensations by winning the third place play-off. In the group stage, Croatia eliminated Japan and Jamaica, suffering a insignificant loss to Argentina in the final game. In the knockout stages they passed by Romania, winning 1–0 from a penalty kick. This prepared them for a quarter-final against Germany. Croatia beat Germany 3–0. However, Croatia were stopped by the hosts France in the semifinal. Blažević made a critical coaching decision in that semi-final as he failed to insert his most talented player Robert Prosinečki when the game was in the balance at 1–1. Instead he opted for Silvio Marić to replace the injured Boban after half-time and Croatia eventually lost the game 2–1. In the third-place match, Prosinečki started in Boban's stead; his fielding proved fruitful as he scored the opening goal and assisted for the second, becoming man of the match. Croatia won against the Netherlands 2–1 to claim their first bronze.

The rest of his stint as Croatian manager was less successful. Croatia failed to qualify for Euro 2000, after finishing a third in a qualifying group behind FR Yugoslavia and Ireland. Blažević retained his position and began to build a new team, filled with younger players for the 2002 FIFA World Cup. However, after Croatia opened the qualifiers with two draws, he was forced to resign in autumn 2000.

=== Iran tenure and return to Croatia ===
Well known throughout the football world for his 1998 World Cup sensation, Blažević accepted an offer to lead the Iranian national team midway through the 2002 World Cup qualification process. Coming in ahead of the final qualifying round, he quickly developed a following among many of the Iranian fans. He kept the 3–5–2 formation that Iran had played with previously in the 96 Asian Cup, in which Iranian national team had won third place. He also introduced new players to Team Melli such as Rahman Rezaei, Javad Nekounam, and Ebrahim Mirzapour. Known as loudmouth and showman, Blažević stayed true to form by claiming he would hang himself from the goalposts if Iran failed to beat Ireland in the deciding qualification playoff for the 2002 World Cup. Ireland won 2–1 on aggregate, the defeat that marked the end of Blažević's time in Iran as his assistant Branko Ivanković took over.

Blažević returned to Croatia, first saving NK Osijek from relegation and then again in Dinamo. In his fourth term as Dinamo coach, Blažević won the Croatian Championship in 2003, but left again same year after clashing with his long-time friend, Dinamo's vice president Zdravko Mamić.

Blažević then led Slovenian NK Mura for few months before becoming the coach of Croatian side NK Varteks, a post he held until 31 May 2005. While at Varteks Zlatko Dalić was his assistant coach.

=== Short stint at Hajduk ===
Blažević controversially announced that he was going to coach Hajduk Split in 2005–06, having expressed his desire to coach the southern Croatian side for decades; many fans were skeptical due to his association with Hajduk Split's derby rival Dinamo Zagreb. His arrival caused a great deal of media controversy; Hajduk Split fans had differing opinions, with a significant number seeing Blažević as a "miracle worker" that would help Hajduk Split regain its former glory.

Hajduk Split under Blažević's leadership immediately got eliminated from European competitions, following an 8–0 aggregate defeat to Hungarian side Debreceni VSC; the 5–0 second leg loss is considered one of Hajduk Split's worst losses in European competitions. This was followed by a series of losses and unsatisfying results at the beginning of the new league season, which finally forced Blažević to resign on 18 September. He was replaced by Igor Štimac, former Hajduk Split player and one of his main supporters in club administration.

=== Neuchâtel and NK Zagreb ===
In October 2005, he went back to Switzerland and coached Neuchâtel Xamax, replacing Alain Geiger in an attempt to save the club from relegation after they had won just one out of their first ten games of the season. Although Blažević achieved some notable victories with Neuchâtel against Swiss powerhouses FC Basel and FC Zurich, they finished the season in ninth place (in a ten-club league) and went to relegation playoff. They were eventually relegated after losing to another Swiss team Blažević had managed 35 years earlier, FC Sion, 3–0 on aggregate, and his tenure there ended in June 2006.

Once again, he returned to Croatia, this time to take over NK Zagreb. The club experienced a successful 2006–07 season which saw them finish third behind Dinamo Zagreb and Hajduk Split and earned them a spot in Intertoto Cup 2007. However, in the following season the team made for an early exit, losing against their first Intertoto opponent Vllaznia on away goals. After Ivica Vrdoljak and Mario Mandžukić were transferred to city rivals Dinamo Zagreb at the beginning of the season, the team saw a string of mediocre results before finishing the season sixth. Immediately after the last game of the season, Blažević announced that his stint at NK Zagreb had come to an end by mutual consent between him and the club's chairman.

=== Bosnia and Herzegovina ===
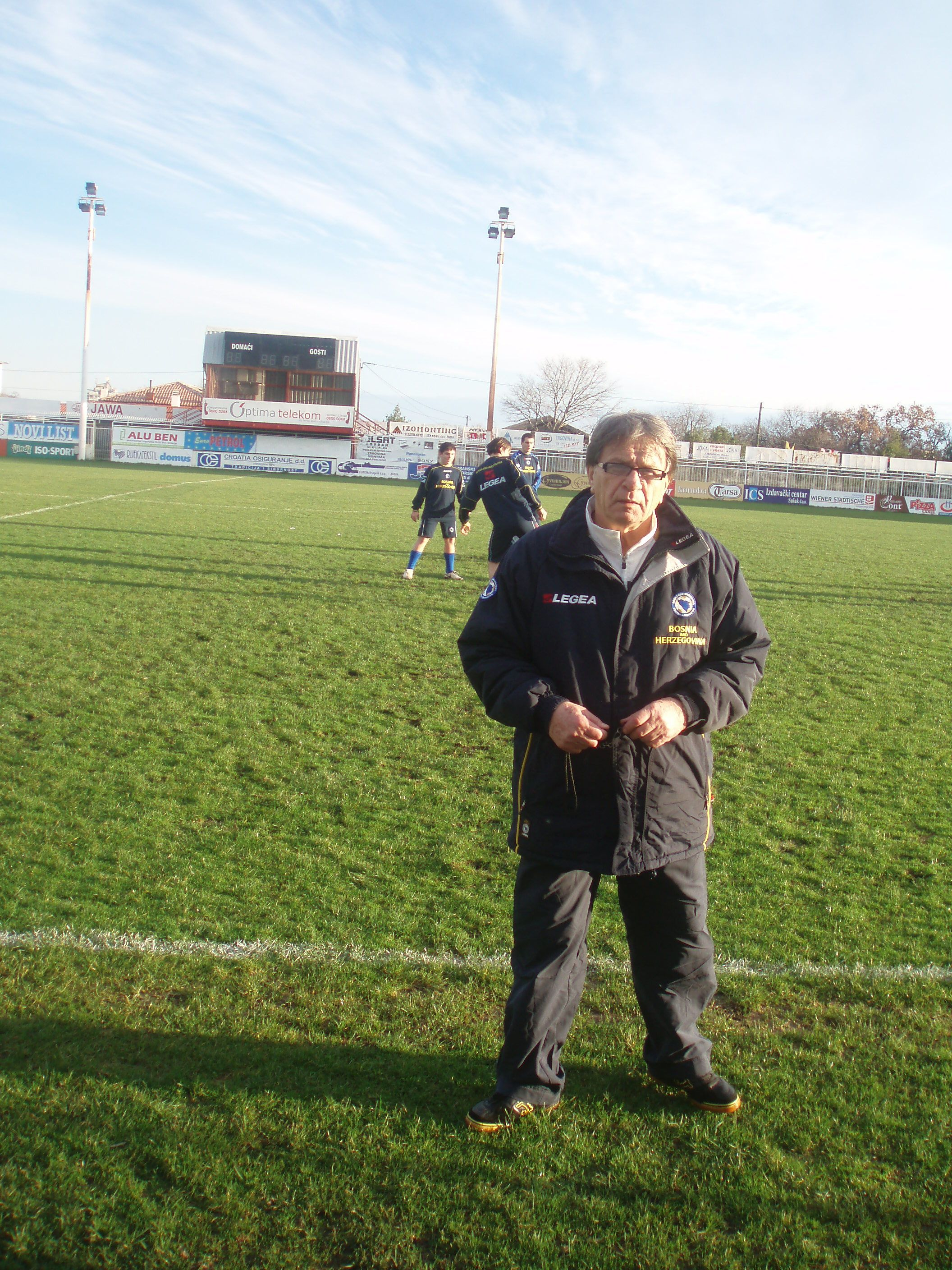
Blažević as Bosnia and Herzegovina manager in 2009

On 10 July 2008, Blažević was appointed head coach of Bosnia and Herzegovina national football team replacing Meho Kodro who had been dismissed two months earlier by the Bosnian FA (FSBiH) officials after reportedly refusing to take charge of the national team for a friendly against Iran. Since Kodro's dismissal was seen by many fans as the latest in a series of problematic decisions by the much-maligned FA leadership, Blažević was thus, by proxy, not welcomed with open arms by certain sections of the public upon his arrival. With the national team in complete disarray and many players refusing to even answer call-ups by interim head coach Denijal Pirić, the appointment of Blažević was seen by many fans as FA's desperate makeshift solution designed to appease the public in the wake of the ongoing two-month fiasco by bringing in a fairly established name. However, combining his carefully crafted showman public persona with some decent initial results on the pitch, Blažević quickly managed to charm most of the public into getting behind him. By his own admission, Blažević had already been close to getting the Bosnia-Herzegovina national team job six years earlier in 2002, but ended up not getting hired due to influential FSBiH executive Jusuf Pušina who considered Blažević unsuitable for the job because of the coach's association with the Croatian wartime president Franjo Tuđman and his political party.

Bosnia under Blažević has qualified for the 2010 FIFA World Cup qualifier playoffs, playing a game against Portugal. In Lisbon, Portugal, Bosnia lost 1–0, with a goal scored by Bruno Alves. In Zenica, Bosnia lost 1–0 against Portugal, with a goal scored by Raul Meireles. He was appointed manager to the Bosnia-Herzegovina team on 10 July 2008 and announced on 11 December 2009 his demission. His dismissal was preceded by criticism from Bosnian fans and journalists following Blažević's attack on fan-favorite Zvjezdan Misimović, blaming him for the defeat against Portugal.

=== Shanghai Shenhua ===
After his recession as head coach of the Bosnia and Herzegovina national football team he signed one day later on 12 December 2009 for Shanghai Shenhua. He finished the 2010 Chinese Super League season in a high third-place position qualifying for the AFC Champions League.

=== China Olympic ===
Blažević was appointed manager of the Chinese Olympic team on 30 November 2010. He resigned from his position in June 2011 after they failed to qualify to the 2012 Summer Olympics.

=== Mes Kerman ===
On 28 August 2011, Iran Pro League side Mes Kerman announced that they will sign a contract with Blažević to replace Samad Marfavi who had resigned two days earlier. On 31 August 2011, he returned to Iran after ten years and signed a one-year contract with Mes. On 9 September 2011, his side plays a match against Damash Gilan with a 1–1 draw. He started his career in the club successfully, but after the weeks, Mes returned to the relegation zone. He was sacked as club's head coach on 14 February 2012 and was appointed technical director of the club.

=== NK Zagreb ===
In November 2012 he returned to NK Zagreb to help the club stay in the Prva HNL since they were in the relegation zone. In the beginning he started to have decent results like defeating Dinamo Zagreb on home ground but later his team started to decline in results. In December 2012 he almost left the club because he had a serious argument with the NK Zagreb chairman but he decided to stay. In May 2013 after NK Zagreb failed to secure a place in the Prva HNL and finished at the bottom of the league he announced his retirement from professional football at the end of the season.

=== Sloboda Tuzla ===
In January 2014, after refusing to take over the Croatian Second Football League club NK Solin, Blažević signed with the Bosnian Sloboda Tuzla playing in the second level Bosnian League. He took over the club while it was second on the league table and agreed to lead the club until the end of the season with the goal to reach the top level Bosnian league, He succeeded, with Sloboda winning 13 and drawing 1 of his 15 matches in charge to win the First League of FBiH with a record total of 71 points from their 30 league games in the season.

=== Zadar ===
On 2 September 2014, after Sloboda Tuzla, he was named the manager of Croatian First Football League club NK Zadar, but he parted ways with the club and finished his coaching career on 2 January 2015.

== Personal life and death ==
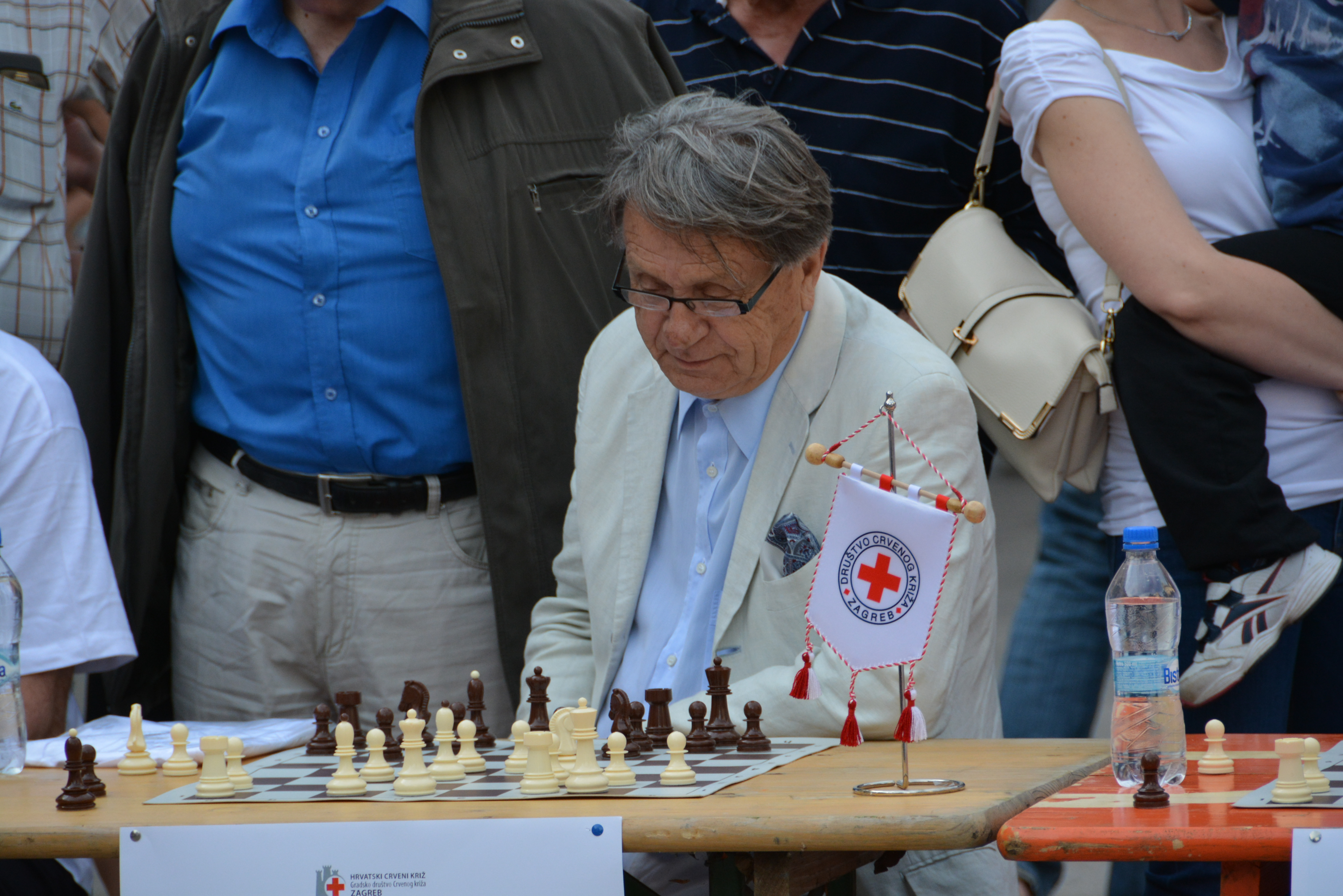
Blažević playing chess at a public event in Zagreb, 2016

Blažević married Zdenka Đorđević in 1962. The couple had three children and five grandchildren. Apart from Croatian, he also held Swiss citizenship.

Blažević died of prostate cancer in Zagreb on 8 February 2023, one day before his 88th birthday. He was buried at Zagreb's Mirogoj Cemetery on 15 February.

== Political engagement ==
Blažević was an admirer of Franjo Tuđman with whom he maintained a friendship as well. Blažević was also a member of the former Croatian president Tuđman's conservative political party HDZ, but he publicly disagreed with his successor, the pro-European centrist politician Ivo Sanader. Because of this, Blažević left the party in 2000 shortly after Tuđman's death, and then decided to run for President of Croatia as an independent candidate. Polls predicting the 2005 presidential election results usually gave him 1–2% of the vote. In the end he received 17,847 votes (0.80%) and was eliminated in the first round of the election.

Following the presidential elections debacle he quit politics, until he appeared once again four years later at the 2009 Zagreb local elections where he successfully ran as HDZ candidate for the city council. He claimed that prime minister Ivo Sanader had talked him into re-joining the party and running for office. He was at the time the oldest serving member of the Zagreb City Council and a member of the city board for naming streets and squares.

During World War II in Yugoslavia, Blažević's two brothers, Anto and Joso, were members of the Ustaše, a fascist organization which ruled Croatia at the time. They were both killed in combat, aged seventeen. Speaking of his brothers, Blažević stated: "I will never try to justify what they did, just like my father never tried to justify it. No normal person can support that which goes against humanity and civilised behaviour".

== Controversy ==
=== Robert Prosinečki ===
At the end of the 1986–87 season, Dinamo Zagreb head coach Blažević presided over eighteen-year-old prospect Robert Prosinečki's departure from the club, famously stating he "would eat his coaching diploma if Prosinečki ever became a [quality] football player". In the summer of 1987, Prosinečki moved to Yugoslav First League rivals Red Star Belgrade where he would go on to develop into one of the best players in Yugoslavia, winning three league titles, one cup trophy, and the European Cup title over the course of the following four years followed by a prominent transfer to Real Madrid and later Barcelona.

During his head coaching tenure with Croatia, Blažević frequently called up Prosinečki as the player became a crucial part of the team and the two seemingly mended fences.

Their ambivalent relationship took a turn for the worse again at Croatia's 1998 FIFA World Cup semi-final match against France when Blažević did not bring twenty-nine-year-old Prosinečki into the contest until the 89th minute with Croatia down 1–2 and up a man since 74th minute (having led at the start of the second half and being tied until the 70th minute). Many sports journalists and supporters have claimed that Croatia would have reached the final had Prosinečki been given meaningful playing time in the match. Blažević has since claimed that Prosinečki "feigned picking up an injury" during training the day before the match. Prosinečki commented on the match in 2014 by saying: "We are on good terms today, I appreciate him [Blažević] because he is unique. A man like him is born once in a lifetime, that's for sure. He has his flaws just like we all have, but he has his virtues too. For some reason, he always had problems with me. Had I played the match against France for at least 30 minutes I believe I would have, at the very least, been able to do something [positive]. Maybe we could have been champions, I don't know! I'm not angry, that would not be an accurate description of my feelings [on this]. Let's just say that I think of it as his mistake that he has to deal with."

=== Affaire VA-OM ===
On 20 October 1995 at Geneva Airport, while waiting to board a flight to Brussels, Blažević was taken into custody by the French financial police on match-fixing and corruption accusations stemming from his time in Nantes. The arrest occurred as part of a wide-ranging football bribery scandal in France, known in the country as Affaire VA-OM, and was based on former Olympique Marseille director Jean-Pierre Bernès' July 1995 testimony, claiming that FC Nantes head coach Blažević took a ₣420,000 bribe to fix the Marseille vs. Nantes French Division 1 league match on 25 November 1989 that ended in a 0–0 draw.

Blažević was released from Luynes Prison on 6 November 1995 on a ₣100,000 bail and was not called up again after giving his statement.

=== Referee incident ===
After his first match as manager of Osijek on 6 March 2002 Blažević lost to Dinamo Zagreb. After the match he was accused of verbal abuse and assaulting the referee Ivan Novak. Blažević was found guilty by disciplinary judge Krešimir Vlajčević and fined 6000kn and got a three-month suspension.

== Career statistics ==
- Incomplete

Appearances and goals by club, season and competition
Club	Season	League			Yugoslav Cup		Total	
Club	Season	Division	Apps	Goals	Apps	Goals	Apps	Goals
Dinamo Zagreb	1954–55	Yugoslav First League	0	0	0	0	0	0
Lokomotiva Zagreb	1955–56	Yugoslav Second League (I Zone)	—		—		0	0
Lokomotiva Zagreb	1956–57	Yugoslav First League	4	0	0	0	4	0
Lokomotiva Zagreb	Total		4	0	0	0	4	0
Sarajevo	1957–58	Yugoslav Second League (II A Zone)	—		—		0	0
Sarajevo	1958–59	Yugoslav First League	14	0	—		14	0
Sarajevo	Total		14	0	0	0	14	0
Rijeka	1959–60	Yugoslav First League	10	2	—		10	2
Rijeka	1960–61	Yugoslav First League	20	2	—		20	2
Rijeka	1961–62	Yugoslav First League	4	0	—		4	0
Rijeka	1962–63	Yugoslav First League	14	0	—		14	0
Rijeka	Total		48	4	0	0	48	4
Career total			66	4	0	0	66	4

== Managerial statistics ==
=== Club statistics ===
As of 12 December 2014

Club	From	To	Competition	Record				
Club	From	To	Competition	P	W	D	L	Win %
Vevey-Sports 05	1968	1971	1. Liga	48	32	8	8	66.67
Vevey-Sports 05	1968	1971	Nationalliga B	26	8	6	12	30.77
Vevey-Sports 05	1968	1971	Swiss Cup	7	4	0	3	57.14
Vevey-Sports 05 Total				81	44	14	23	54.32
FC Sion	11 September 1971	12 June 1976	Nationalliga A	125	45	42	38	36.00
FC Sion	11 September 1971	12 June 1976	Swiss Cup	19	10	5	4	52.63
FC Sion	11 September 1971	12 June 1976	Swiss League Cup	11	5	2	4	45.45
FC Sion	11 September 1971	12 June 1976	UEFA Cup	2	1	0	1	50.00
FC Sion	11 September 1971	12 June 1976	European Cup Winners' Cup	2	1	0	1	50.00
FC Sion Total				159	62	49	48	38.99
FC Lausanne-Sport	14 August 1976	13 June 1979	Nationalliga A	96	43	21	32	44.79
FC Lausanne-Sport	14 August 1976	13 June 1979	Swiss Cup	9	6	2	1	66.67
FC Lausanne-Sport	14 August 1976	13 June 1979	Swiss League Cup	6	4	0	2	66.67
FC Lausanne-Sport Total				111	53	23	35	47.75
HNK Rijeka	15 July 1979	7 December 1980	First League	51	19	12	20	37.25
HNK Rijeka	15 July 1979	7 December 1980	Yugoslav Cup	2	0	2	0	0.00
HNK Rijeka	15 July 1979	7 December 1980	European Cup Winners' Cup	6	2	2	2	33.33
NK Rijeka Total				59	21	16	22	35.59
Dinamo Zagreb	2 March 1980	26 June 1983	First League	85	38	33	14	44.71
Dinamo Zagreb	2 March 1980	26 June 1983	Yugoslav Cup	12	9	1	2	75.00
Dinamo Zagreb	2 March 1980	26 June 1983	European Cup	2	1	0	1	50.00
Dinamo Zagreb Total				98	48	34	16	48.98
Grasshopper	10 August 1983	2 December 1984	Nationalliga A	46	26	10	10	56.52
Grasshopper	10 August 1983	2 December 1984	Swiss Cup	7	5	1	1	71.43
Grasshopper	10 August 1983	2 December 1984	European Cup	6	1	1	4	16.67
Grasshopper Total				59	32	12	15	54.24
Priština	21 April 1985	23 June 1985	First League	9	6	1	2	66.67
Priština Total				9	6	1	2	66.67
Dinamo Zagreb	2 August 1985	12 June 1988	First League	102	41	33	28	40.20
Dinamo Zagreb	2 August 1985	12 June 1988	Yugoslav Cup	7	2	4	1	28.57
Dinamo Zagreb Total				109	43	37	29	39.45
FC Nantes	15 July 1988	27 January 1991	Division 1	98	34	36	28	34.69
FC Nantes	15 July 1988	27 January 1991	Coupe de France	8	5	1	2	62.50
FC Nantes Total				106	39	37	30	36.79
PAOK	9 September 1991	22 March 1992	Super League	25	11	10	4	44.00
PAOK	9 September 1991	22 March 1992	Greek Cup	8	4	2	2	50.00
PAOK	9 September 1991	22 March 1992	UEFA Cup	4	1	1	2	25.00
PAOK Total				36	15	13	8	41.67
Croatia Zagreb	23 August 1992	12 June 1994	Prva HNL	64	41	15	8	64.06
Croatia Zagreb	23 August 1992	12 June 1994	Croatian Cup	15	11	1	3	73.33
Croatia Zagreb	23 August 1992	12 June 1994	Croatian Super Cup	2	0	2	0	0.00
Croatia Zagreb	23 August 1992	12 June 1994	UEFA Champions League	4	3	0	1	75.00
Croatia Zagreb Total				85	55	18	12	64.71
Croatia Zagreb	15 September 1995	26 October 1995	Prva HNL	3	2	0	1	66.67
Croatia Zagreb	15 September 1995	26 October 1995	Croatian Cup	1	0	0	1	0.00
Croatia Zagreb	15 September 1995	26 October 1995	UEFA Cup Winners' Cup	2	1	0	1	50.00
Croatia Zagreb Total				6	3	0	3	50.00
NK Osijek	6 March 2002	4 May 2002	Prva HNL	9	5	2	2	55.56
NK Osijek Total				9	5	2	2	55.56
Dinamo Zagreb	20 July 2002	31 May 2003	Prva HNL	32	25	3	4	78.13
Dinamo Zagreb	20 July 2002	31 May 2003	Croatian Cup	1	0	1	0	0.00
Dinamo Zagreb	20 July 2002	31 May 2003	Croatian Super Cup	1	0	1	0	0.00
Dinamo Zagreb	20 July 2002	31 May 2003	UEFA Cup	4	2	0	2	50.00
Dinamo Zagreb Total				38	27	5	6	71.05
NK Mura	20 July 2003	17 September 2003	PrvaLiga	8	3	1	4	37.50
NK Mura	20 July 2003	17 September 2003	Slovenian Cup	2	1	0	1	50.00
NK Mura Total				10	4	1	5	40.00
NK Varteks	4 October 2003	28 May 2005	Prva HNL	55	20	13	22	36.36
NK Varteks	4 October 2003	28 May 2005	Croatian Cup	13	7	4	2	53.85
NK Varteks	4 October 2003	28 May 2005	UEFA Cup	1	0	0	1	0.00
NK Varteks Total				69	27	17	25	39.13
Hajduk Split	15 July 2005	17 September 2005	Prva HNL	8	3	2	3	37.50
Hajduk Split	15 July 2005	17 September 2005	Croatian Super Cup	1	0	1	0	0.00
Hajduk Split	15 July 2005	17 September 2005	UEFA Champions League	2	0	0	2	0.00
Hajduk Split Total				11	3	3	5	27.27
Neuchâtel Xamax	25 September 2005	21 May 2006	Super League	29	8	6	15	27.59
Neuchâtel Xamax	25 September 2005	21 May 2006	Swiss Cup	1	0	0	1	0.00
Neuchâtel Xamax Total				30	8	6	16	26.67
NK Zagreb	29 July 2006	10 May 2008	Prva HNL	66	29	15	22	43.94
NK Zagreb	29 July 2006	10 May 2008	Croatian Cup	10	4	2	4	40.00
NK Zagreb	29 July 2006	10 May 2008	UEFA Intertoto Cup	2	1	0	1	50.00
NK Zagreb Total				78	34	17	27	43.59
Shanghai Shenhua	2 March 2010	6 November 2010	Super League	30	14	6	10	46.67
Shanghai Shenhua Total				30	14	6	10	46.67
Mes Kerman	9 September 2011	8 February 2012	Pro League	20	7	5	8	35.00
Mes Kerman	9 September 2011	8 February 2012	Hazfi Cup	4	2	1	1	50.00
Mes Kerman Total				24	9	6	9	37.50
NK Zagreb	9 November 2012	26 May 2013	Prva HNL	19	5	3	11	26.32
NK Zagreb Total				19	5	3	11	26.32
FK Sloboda Tuzla	2 March 2014	31 May 2014	First League of FBiH	15	13	1	1	86.67
FK Sloboda Tuzla Total				15	13	1	1	86.67
NK Zadar	14 September 2014	2 January 2015	Prva HNL	12	2	2	8	16.67
NK Zadar	14 September 2014	2 January 2015	Croatian Cup	2	2	0	0	100.00
NK Zadar Total				14	4	2	8	28.57
Totals				1,265	574	323	368	45.38

*Dates of first and last games under Blažević; not dates of official appointments

=== National teams statistics ===
Team	Tenure	Played	Won	Drawn	Lost	Win %	Points per game	Honours
Switzerland	September 1976 – October 1976	2	0	0	2	0.00	0.00	
Croatia	March 1994 – November 2000	73	36	22	15	49.31	1.78	1996 Euro – Quarter-final; 1998 World Cup – Third place
Iran	January 2001 – November 2001	19	10	4	5	53	1.78	
Bosnia and Herzegovina	July 2008 – December 2009	17	8	2	7	47.05	1.52	
China Olympic	November 2010 – August 2011	5	2	1	2	50.00	1.50	
Totals		108	55	28	28	50	1.75	

== Filmography ==
=== Film ===
Year	Film	Role	Notes
2004	Years of the Blazers	Himself	Documentary film
2011	Ćiro	Himself	Documentary film
2012	Montevideo, God Bless You!	Ante Pandaković	Credited as Miroslav Ćiro Blažević
2016	Vinko & little red riding hood	Himself	Online short film

=== Television ===
Year	Film	Role	Notes
1983	Smogovci	Manager of Dinamo Zagreb	Episode: "Patnje i stradanja Dunje i Mazala". Credited as Miroslav Ćiro Blažević.
1992–2008	Nightmare Stage	Himself	Multiple appearances
2001	Svlačionica	Himself	Episode: Robert Prosinečki
2006	Kazalište u kući	Lonely man	Episode: Usamljena srca
2007–2008	Ćiroskop	Himself	Host of the show.
2009	Moja 3 zida	Himself	Episode: 1.3
2009	IN magazin	Himself	Hidden camera
2011-2012	Studio 45	Himself	3 appearances
2015	N1 Pressing	Himself	Interview 16.02.2015.
2016	Ko te šiša	Himself	TV movie
2017	Nikad nije kasno	Himself	Episode: 1.1

=== Music videos ===
Year	Video	Role	Authors
1998	Neka pati koga smeta	Himself	Baruni
2004	Ako zabijemo gol	Himself	General Woo & Nered

Source: Miroslav Blazevic IMDb

== Honours ==
=== Player ===
Lokomotiva Zagreb

- Yugoslav Second League: 1955–56

Sarajevo

- Yugoslav Second League: 1957–58

=== Manager ===
Vevey

- 1. Liga: 1969–70

Sion

- Swiss Cup: 1974

Dinamo Zagreb

- Yugoslav First League: 1981–82
- Yugoslav Cup: 1982–83
- Prva HNL: 1992–93, 2002–03
- Croatian Cup: 1993–94
- Croatian Super Cup: 2002

Grasshopper

- Swiss Super League: 1983–84

Hajduk Split

- Croatian Super Cup: 2005

Sloboda Tuzla

- First League of FBiH: 2013–14

Croatia

- FIFA World Cup third place: 1998

Individual

- Franjo Bučar State Award for Sport: 1998 (two awards), 2007
- Bosnian Coach of the Year: 2009

== Orders ==
- Order of Danica Hrvatska with face of Franjo Bučar (1995)
- Order of Duke Branimir with Necklace (1998)

== See also ==
- National team managers with 100 or more matches
- List of football managers with the most matches
