= Burruchaga =

Burruchaga is a surname of Basque origin. Notable people with the surname include:

- Jorge Burruchaga (born 1962), Argentine football coach and former player
- Mauro Burruchaga (born 1998), Argentine footballer
- Román Andrés Burruchaga (born 2002), Argentine tennis player
