= 1992–93 French Division 1 =

55th season of French Division 1

Division 1
- Season: 1992–93
- Dates: 8 August 1992 – 2 June 1993
- Champions: unattributed
- Relegated: Valenciennes; Toulon; Nîmes
- Champions League: Monaco
- Cup Winners' Cup: Paris Saint-Germain
- UEFA Cup: Bordeaux; Nantes; Auxerre
- Matches: 380
- Goals: 887 (2.33 per match)
- Top goalscorer: Alen Bokšić (23 goals)

The 1992–93 Division 1 season was the 55th since its establishment. Marseille finished in first with 53 points, but were stripped of their title due to a bribery scandal. Paris Saint-Germain, who had finished second, refused to accept the title, resulting in no team being crowned champions for the season.

== Affaire VA-OM ==
The European Cup was renamed the Champions League in 1992–93, and Marseille reached the final for the second time in three years. They defeated Milan to become the first French team to win a European Trophy.

A corruption scandal involving a league match against Valenciennes emerged a few days before the Champions League final. It was alleged that club president Bernard Tapie had bribed Valenciennes to lose so that Olympique de Marseille would win the French League earlier, giving them more time to prepare for the Champions League final. Valenciennes players Christophe Robert, Jorge Burruchaga and Jacques Glassmann claimed that Marseille midfielder Jean-Jacques Eydelie offered them ₣250,000 to "take the foot off of the gas" in the May 20 match. Marseille were later stripped of their league title and relegated to Division 2 by the French Football Federation, while Tapie was forced to step down as the club's president. Marseille were not stripped of the Champions League, as the match in question was not in the competition, but were excluded from the 1993–94 UEFA Champions League, as well as regular reigning European champions match in 1993 Intercontinental Cup and 1993 European Super Cup.

No winner was declared for the 1992–1993 season. The LFP allotted the title to Paris Saint-Germain but owners Canal+ refused it. The TV chain feared the reactions of their subscribers in Provence and threatened to withdraw from football completely if the title was awarded to PSG. Ultimately the LFP decided that the 1993 title would remain unattributed. Canal+ refused to allow the club to participate in the following season's Champions League after Marseille's exclusion by UEFA.

== Participating teams ==
Location of teams in 1992–93 Division 1
- Auxerre
- Bordeaux
- SM Caen
- Le Havre AC
- Lens
- Lille
- Olympique Lyonnais
- Olympique de Marseille
- FC Metz
- AS Monaco
- Montpellier HSC
- FC Nantes Atlantique
- Nîmes Olympique
- Paris Saint-Germain
- AS Saint-Étienne
- FC Sochaux-Montbéliard
- RC Strasbourg
- Sporting Toulon Var
- Toulouse FC
- US Valenciennes Anzin

== League table ==
Pos	Team	Pld	W	D	L	GF	GA	GD	Pts	Qualification or relegation
1	Marseille (D)	38	22	10	6	71	36	+35	53 (Note: Marseille and Valenciennes were deducted one point for their involvement in the French football bribery scandal.)	Disqualified from the Champions League (Note: Marseille were stripped of the title and barred from 1993–94 UEFA Champions League due to their involvement in the bribery scandal. Retained league status.)
2	Paris Saint-Germain (N)	38	20	11	7	61	29	+32	51	Qualification to the Cup Winners' Cup first round (Note: Paris Saint-Germain qualified for the 1993–94 European Cup Winners' Cup as winners of the 1992–93 Coupe de France.)
3	Monaco	38	21	9	8	56	29	+27	51	Qualification to the Champions League first round (Note: Monaco qualified for the Champions League as league champions Marseille were disqualified and runners-up Paris Saint-Germain declined to participate.)
4	Bordeaux	38	18	12	8	42	25	+17	48	Qualification to the UEFA Cup first round
5	Nantes	38	17	11	10	54	39	+15	45	Qualification to the UEFA Cup first round
6	Auxerre	38	18	7	13	57	44	+13	43	Qualification to the UEFA Cup first round
7	Saint-Étienne	38	13	17	8	34	26	+8	43	
8	Strasbourg	38	12	16	10	58	57	+1	40	
9	Lens	38	12	16	10	36	41	−5	40	
10	Montpellier	38	12	12	14	36	41	−5	36	
11	Caen	38	13	9	16	55	54	+1	35	
12	Metz	38	11	13	14	44	45	−1	35	
13	Toulouse	38	9	16	13	36	45	−9	34	
14	Lyon	38	9	15	14	40	45	−5	33	
15	Le Havre	38	11	11	16	42	53	−11	33	
16	Sochaux	38	11	10	17	33	50	−17	32	
17	Lille	38	7	16	15	26	48	−22	30	
18	Valenciennes (R)	38	9	12	17	42	56	−14	29	Qualification to relegation play-offs
19	Toulon (D, R)	38	6	13	19	31	57	−26	25	Administratively relegated to Championnat National (Note: Toulon was administratively relegated to Championnat National due to financial difficulties.)
20	Nîmes (R)	38	3	16	19	32	66	−34	22	Relegation to French Division 2

Source: Histoire du PSG
Rules for classification: 1) points; 2) goal difference; 3) number of goals scored.
Victory: 2 points, Draw: 1 point, Defeat: 0 points
(D) Disqualified; (N) Refused title and entry to the UCL; (R) Relegated
Notes:

Promoted from 1992–93 French Division 2, who will play in 1993–94 French Division 1

- FC Martigues: Champions of Division 2, winner of Division 2 group A
- Angers SCO: Runners-up, winners of Division 2 group B
- AS Cannes: Winners of playoffs against Valenciennes

== Results ==
Home \ Away	AUX	BOR	CAE	LHA	RCL	LIL	OL	OM	MET	ASM	MHS	FCN	NMS	PSG	STE	SOC	RCS	SCT	TFC	VFC
Auxerre		1–0	3–2	4–1	1–1	2–0	2–1	0–2	4–0	4–1	2–0	1–1	5–2	1–2	1–0	0–3	2–0	2–1	0–0	3–2
Bordeaux	1–0		2–0	3–0	0–0	3–0	0–0	1–0	2–1	1–0	2–1	3–0	1–1	1–1	0–0	3–0	1–1	1–1	2–0	3–0
Caen	2–1	1–0		3–3	0–1	4–3	3–2	2–3	0–1	1–0	2–3	1–1	2–2	0–2	0–0	2–0	3–0	2–1	4–1	3–0
Le Havre	0–0	0–1	2–3		0–1	1–0	2–0	1–3	2–1	0–0	1–1	2–0	2–0	1–1	0–1	0–0	3–0	2–1	3–2	0–0
Lens	0–3	1–2	0–3	0–0		0–0	0–3	2–2	2–0	0–0	2–0	1–0	0–0	2–1	1–1	0–0	2–0	2–1	0–2	2–1
Lille	1–0	0–2	1–0	2–1	0–0		1–1	2–0	1–1	1–1	0–0	1–1	2–2	0–0	0–0	0–0	2–3	1–0	2–2	1–2
Lyon	1–1	2–3	1–0	1–1	3–1	1–3		2–2	1–1	0–0	2–1	0–2	0–1	1–1	0–2	3–1	2–2	1–1	1–0	2–1
Marseille	2–0	0–0	2–1	1–1	2–0	4–1	2–1		3–2	1–0	1–1	0–1	6–1	3–1	1–0	2–0	5–0	5–2	2–1	2–1
Metz	0–1	1–1	1–0	2–3	1–2	0–0	2–0	2–1		1–0	1–1	4–0	3–0	2–1	2–2	5–1	3–0	0–0	1–1	0–0
Monaco	4–0	0–0	4–2	2–0	2–1	3–0	2–1	1–0	2–0		0–0	3–1	3–1	3–1	1–0	1–0	2–1	4–0	4–0	2–1
Montpellier	1–0	2–0	2–0	2–0	1–2	3–0	0–2	1–1	1–0	0–0		1–0	1–0	0–0	1–2	1–0	1–1	1–1	0–1	1–3
Nantes	2–1	1–0	1–1	5–2	3–2	4–0	1–0	0–2	0–0	1–0	6–0		2–0	1–0	0–0	1–1	2–2	0–0	4–1	3–1
Nîmes	1–2	0–0	1–2	0–2	1–1	0–0	2–3	1–3	2–2	0–1	0–0	1–1		0–1	1–1	1–1	2–6	0–1	1–1	2–1
Paris SG	2–0	5–0	2–0	1–0	1–1	3–0	1–1	0–1	5–1	1–0	1–0	1–0	2–3		3–1	2–0	1–1	2–0	0–0	2–0
Saint-Étienne	1–0	2–1	1–1	0–0	0–0	0–0	0–0	0–2	2–0	0–0	1–0	1–0	1–0	1–2		2–0	1–2	2–0	3–2	4–2
Sochaux	0–3	0–1	1–0	3–2	1–1	1–0	1–0	2–2	2–0	1–2	1–1	0–1	1–1	1–3	1–0		0–0	2–1	1–0	2–1
Strasbourg	1–1	0–1	1–1	3–1	4–1	2–0	2–1	2–2	1–1	3–0	3–1	2–4	1–1	0–4	2–2	6–1		1–1	0–0	0–0
Toulon	1–2	0–0	1–1	1–2	2–2	1–0	0–0	0–0	1–0	4–5	1–0	1–3	1–0	0–2	0–0	0–4	0–2		2–0	1–2
Toulouse	2–1	2–0	1–1	1–0	0–0	0–0	0–0	3–1	0–0	0–2	1–3	2–0	3–0	2–2	0–0	1–0	1–1	1–1		1–2
Valenciennes	3–3	1–0	3–2	4–1	0–2	0–1	0–0	– (Note: The match Valenciennes-Marseille, initially concluded with the score 0–1, was declared a defeat for both teams with the score 0–0.)	0–2	1–1	1–3	1–1	1–1	1–1	0–0	1–0	1–2	3–1	1–1	

Legend: Blue = home team win; Yellow = draw; Red = away team win.

== Relegation play-offs ==
Team 1	Agg.	Team 2	1st leg	2nd leg
Valenciennes	1–3	Cannes	0–2	1–1

== Top goalscorers ==
Rank	Player	Club	Goals
1	(Croatia) Alen Bokšić	Marseille	23
2	(France) Xavier Gravelaine	Caen	20
3	(Germany) Jürgen Klinsmann	Monaco	19
4	(Germany) Rudi Völler	Marseille	18
5	(Ivory Coast) Joël Tiéhi	Le Havre	14
5	(Liberia) George Weah	Paris Saint-Germain	14
7	(France) Nicolas Ouédec	Nantes	13
7	(France) Bernard Ferrer	Toulouse	13
9	(France) Franck Sauzée	Marseille	12
9	(France) Youri Djorkaeff	Monaco	12
9	(France) Franck Leboeuf	Strasbourg	12

== Attendances ==
#	Club	Average
1	Marseille	27,010
2	PSG	26,704
3	Girondins	21,864
4	Strasbourg	21,773
5	Nantes	20,216
6	Saint-Étienne	19,943
7	Lens	17,224
8	Olympique lyonnais	16,678
9	Valenciennes	11,846
10	MHSC	9,917
11	Metz	9,581
12	AJA	9,421
13	Toulouse	9,173
14	Nîmes	8,788
15	Caen	7,767
16	Le Havre	7,130
17	LOSC	6,326
18	Monaco	6,263
19	Toulon	4,212
20	Sochaux	3,691
