= JVA =

JVA may refer to:

- Juba Valley Alliance, a political faction of the Somali Civil War
- Team JVA, a British motor racing team
- Japan Volleyball Association, the sports governing body
- Ankavandra Airport, the IATA code JVA
- Junior Volleyball Association
