= Equine drug testing =

Testing of horses for drugs

Equine drug testing is a form of drug testing applied to performance horses in regulated competition. Most common in racehorses, drug tests are also performed on horses in endurance riding and in international competition such as the Olympics and FEI-sanctioned competition. Many horses in a competition sanctioned by various national organizations, such as the United States Equestrian Federation in the USA are also tested for improper drug use. An organization for cooperation and harmonization regarding horseracing is the International Federation of Horseracing Authorities (IFHA) that have several members in over 50 countries worldwide.

Before the mid-1980s, the use of high potency performance altering substances in racing was less well controlled due to the inadequacy of analytical technology. Around that time, highly sensitive ELISA testing of horse urine was introduced to racing regulators by a group at the University of Kentucky. This proprietary technology essentially solved the problem of the abuse of high potency drugs in racing horses. ELISA tests are now marketed worldwide out of Lexington, Kentucky. Today, further advances in testing technology have augmented and in many instances replaced ELISA tests to detecting doping.

Traces of therapeutic medications and dietary and environmental substances can be detected using current testing technology. This has created controversy over a "zero tolerance" approach to drug testing, and resulted in the establishment of regulatory limits or "thresholds" (the urine or blood concentration of a substance below which there is no pharmacological activity, i.e., there is no effect, a so-called "No Effect Threshold" or NET).

Recent challenges in drug testing include the development of effective regulatory methods for the newer hormonal products such as the various human recombinant erythropoietin products and variants and growth hormones. A high-quality ELISA test for human recombinant erythropoietin is now available, and recently the first Mass Spectral Confirmation method to detect use of human recombinant erythropoietin (rhEPO) in horses or any species was developed.

== History ==
The early history of horse doping is unclear, although according to Euripides (480-406 BC), some horses were fed human flesh to make them faster and more savage. However, during Roman times, the use of hydromel for chariot race horses was punished by crucifixion. The evolution of horse doping is less well known over the following millennia, but in 1666, the use of "exciting substances and methods" was prohibited at horse races in Worksop, England. In 1533, there were reports of a substance, probably related to arsenic, being used as a stimulant. After 1800 there is an uptick in the records of horses being prevented from competing (then called "stopped"), and in 1812 a stable boy was hung on Newmarket Heath for arsenic doping of a horse. In 1903, UK law prohibited horse doping and by 1912, saliva tests were introduced for horses which tested for alkaloids such as theobromine, caffeine, cocaine, morphine, and strychnine. In most major racing countries, positive results automatically disqualified horses. Doping took off, however, in the US in 1933 when pari-mutuel betting was legalized. Estimates suggest as many as 50% of horses were doped during this time, leading to a higher incidence of injuries caused by insensitivity to pain and lack of proper muscle coordination - the principal drugs of the era were cocaine, heroin, strychnine, and caffeine. In the later half of the 20th century, anti-doping efforts increased and became standardized by the FEI. A crackdown on horse doping in 2020 motivated Congress to pass the first law establishing federal regulation of the sport of horse racing. This law created the Horseracing Integrity and Safety Authority to create and enforce safety and drug regulations.

== Types ==
Horse Racing regulators in the United States divide drugs and medications into the following categories:

=== Therapeutic medications ===
Approximately 25 medications are now recognized by the Association of Racing Commissioners International (ARCI) for therapeutic use in race horses. Recent advances in technology resulting in high sensitivity testing continue to enable the detection of ever smaller trace concentrations of medications. This situation has led to the establishment of "thresholds" or "reporting levels," or "decision levels" (California) depending on the semantic preference of individual jurisdictions. These terms apply to the blood concentration of a medication below which it is believed by scientists and racing authorities that the medication has insignificant pharmacological effect. Thresholds (cutoffs) have long been used in human drug testing, however, the concept has been slow to be accepted by horse racing regulators who rely on the mere presence of a substance as a potential rule violation.

Therapeutic medications (or drugs) are properly used to alleviate pain and to allow or promote healing. However, in the sport of horse racing powerful painkilling drugs may be used on a daily basis, often in combination with several other potent drugs, to enable injured horses to train and race before their injuries are fully healed. When this happens, the logical result is that additional injury can occur, rapidly accelerating the need for ever more powerful drugs to keep a horse racing. Official state testing reports do not, however, confirm that such use is widespread in post race samples, although it does occur. Federal laws allowing great latitude for veterinarians to use medications pose a concern for racing regulators who believe improper or over use puts racehorses at greater risk of crippling injuries and death. Jockeys are also exposed to far greater risk, as medicated horses are much more likely to suffer catastrophic breakdowns during a race sending horses and riders tumbling. In a series of articles on drugs and racing The New York Times estimates that approximately 24 horses are killed as a result of injuries incurred during a race each week in America, though the question of how many of these deaths are linked to misuse of medication is undetermined.

For decades, outside scrutiny had been focused on the question of whether horse trainers seek increasing access to pre-race drugs to keep sore horses in training and racing. But in recent years the focus has broadened to include attending veterinarians for racehorses. Experts contend that veterinarians who provide drugs to keep injured horses racing violate veterinary practice laws regarding proper ethics, standards and practices.

The issue of legal and illegal drug use in horse racing is again under review by the U.S. Congress with legislation pending before the House of Representatives and the Senate to create uniform pre-race drug rules and penalties applying in all racing states. The Interstate Horse Racing Improvement Act is endorsed by some of the most prominent names in the thoroughbred racing industry although groups representing other equine breeds, veterinarians, horsemen, and regulators have serious concerns.

=== Performance-modifying substances ===
Identification of these substances in a horse is viewed with great regulatory concern. Testing for these substances usually proceeds at the highest level of sensitivity possible, so-called "zero-tolerance" testing. About 1100 or so substances are classified by the Association of Racing Commissioners International (ARCI) Uniform Classification System for Foreign Substances as potentially performance-enhancing in a five-class system. The most complete listing of such substances is found online.

Stimulants
Among the equine stimulants are amphetamines, as well as the amphetamine-like drugs such as methylphenidate (Ritalin).

Tranquilizers
Horses can also be medicated to win by relaxing them, and allowing the horse to run its best possible race or show with an appearance. The widely used tranquilizer acepromazine, and any number of related or equivalent agents, have been used in this way. Higher doses of tranquilizers can also decrease a horse's performance.

Bronchodilators
Improving a horse's "wind" by opening its airways through the use of bronchodilators may also improve performance, especially in an animal that is sub-clinically broncho-constricted. Some bronchodilators can also have a stimulant effect.

Behavioral modifiers
Veterinarians certify horses as being sound in "wind and limb". Medications that can affect these parameters and also the "attitude" or "behavior" of a horse have the potential to affect both the presentation of a horse and also, presumably, the outcome of a race.

== Detection ==
The Introduction of ELISA testing (1988)
In the mid-1980s, equine drug testing was for all practical purposes dependent on a screening technique called thin layer chromatography (TLC). This technology is not particularly sensitive, and in the mid-1980s some horsemen were reportedly attempting to affect the outcome of horse races by using high potency narcotics, stimulants, bronchodilators, and tranquilizers with impunity. In 1988 ELISA testing was introduced to racing by a group at the University of Kentucky. It soon became the primary technique employed in equine drug testing. ELISA is an acronym for Enzyme Linked Immuno Sorbent Assay. Simply put, an ELISA test is a variant on the home pregnancy test technology. It requires a drop of urine, can be performed relatively rapidly, is highly sensitive, and test results can be read by eye. Initially, the ELISA tests were "one-step" tests meaning that urine was added to the test well followed by the addition of antibody for the test. This was expensive as much more antibody was wasted than reacted on the test. Later, a cheaper "two-step" method was devised. Currently, at least one company in the US primarily deals in "one-step" tests, while the other two in the US deal in "two-step" tests.

Confirmatory Testing
While ELISA screening or testing is fast and fairly sensitive, it is far from specific. The second and absolutely critical step in the drug testing process is confirmation of positive ELISA tests using more sophisticated techniques such gas or liquid chromatography combined with mass spectrometry (GC/MS, LC/MS, or LC/MS/MS). Mass spectrometry is the gold standard drug identification. It is also extremely sensitive. Some drug testing laboratories have moved toward using the more specific mass spectrometric techniques as their primary screening and testing technique.

Zero Tolerance Testing
Zero tolerance testing is not testing down to "zero" molecules, which no chemist can accomplish, but rather testing to the limit of detection (LOD) of the best available technology. In other words, "zero tolerance" refers to the racing regulators' philosophy in regulating drug use in race horses—even trace amounts of drugs are not tolerated. While detecting trace amounts may be an entirely appropriate approach for performance altering substances which have no approved veterinary use, it is not considered appropriate for therapeutic medications which may be present in trace amounts having negligible or no pharmacological activity. Therapeutic medications are approved substances used to maintain the health and welfare of horses.

Thresholds, including “no effect thresholds” (NETs)
The equine blood concentration of a medication below which pharmacologic activity is insignificant.

Withdrawal time
The length of time after the administration of a medication required for the metabolism and elimination of the medication. After this time the medication no longer present or has insufficient concentration to produce a pharmacological effect.

Today, the sensitivity of the testing labs utilized by regulators has become so sensitive that horsemen raise concerns about environmental transfers that may have occurred and can now be detected at the picogram level.

== See also ==
- Doping in sport
- Equine ethics
