= Gambling in Norway =

Gambling in Norway is largely organized through a state monopoly, where Norsk Tipping and Norsk Rikstoto manage most of the gambling services. However, other smaller actors are permitted, including bingo operators and the charitable Pant Lottery and Postcode Lottery.

Norsk Tipping offers games like lotteries, sports betting, Keno and several others. Norsk Tipping is a wholly state-owned company under the jurisdiction of the Ministry of Culture and Church affairs, with rules about what times of day, and how much money players can bet. As of January 2019, all players have to be over 18 years of age to play all games of Norsk Tipping, including scratch tickets. Norsk Rikstoto is also state-owned and is the only company authorised to arrange horse race betting.

It is generally legal to arrange gambling parties at home, as long as these parties are not organised as a business. Except games offered by Norsk Tipping, all other forms of online gambling are illegal, with the government working towards stopping foreign companies from operating in Norway. In June 2010 the Norwegian Government passed a law that forced all banks in Norway to deny the customers the use of credit and debit cards at land and online casinos all over the world.

Norwegian citizens are also required to declare tax winnings made in another country.

On the 14th of May 2024, the majority of the Storting (The supreme legislature of Norway) has adopted amendments to the Gambling Act that, among other things, give the Lotteritilsynet (Norwegian Gambling Authority) a permission to order internet providers to implement DNS blocking of websites that offer gambling that are not licensed in Norway. DNS blocking should have started on 1st of January 2025, and according to Lotteritilsynet nobody has been blocked yet, but this is likely to start happening in the spring of 2025. According to the iGamingToday.com, the DNS block in Norway has already started.

In order for a company to be blocked, Lotteritilsynet has announced that they will consider several things, such as whether the gambling sites offer Norwegian as a language or Norwegian currency for payments, among other things.

== Lottery and gaming legislation ==
Lotteries and games have always been strictly controlled by the Norwegian government. According to §§ 298 and 299 of the Norwegian Penal Code of 1902, only those games of chance that were offered by special licence holders were legal. Only the authority of a legal statute could grant such permission. Thus, all other games, where the main factor affecting the win was luck, were prohibited. Unauthorized gaming operators were punished.

Three acts that were introduced later in the 20th century, offered some exceptions from the strict ban. These were the 1927 Totalisator Act, the 1992 Gaming Act, and the 1995 Lottery Act. In general, they established the state monopoly in the industry. The 1927 Act provided the basis for giving the Norsk Riksoto Foundation the right to offer horse-race betting services. The supervision of their activity was the responsibility of the Ministry of Agriculture.

The 1992 Gaming Act granted the state owned Norsk Tipping AS exclusive rights to operate the number game Lotto and football betting, with the Ministry of Culture and Church Affairs tasked to supervise them. The 1995 Lottery Act was more comprehensive as it defined and described all forms of lotteries and other games. It also allowed socially oriented organizations to run such games, because the money collected could be used for the benefit of society.

== Slots ==
In the late 1990s, operation of slots fell under the regulation of the Lottery Act 1995. That was a piece of legislation prepared at the beginning of the last decade of the 20th century. While at the dawn of slot technology, that legislation was sufficient, but it didn't foresee significant technological advances and the subsequent social reaction.

In 2001 and 2004, the gross turnover from slot machines was NOK 9 billion and NOK 26 billion. That was a tremendous growth comparing to the NOK 200 million in 1990, when slots accounted for a marginal part of the gross turnover of the gaming and lottery sector. In 2004, slot machines brought 64% of gross turnover and 43% of net turnover.

Being poorly regulated and possessing a serious market potential, slot machines industry grew very fast. The Lottery Act granted licences only to charitable organizations, but it also didn't prohibit private companies to run slots on behalf of such organizations and share the profit. In 2002 the authorities started working towards restricting slots. One of the officially named reasons for limiting the number of slot machines and introducing various strict requirements was that the number of problem gamblers grew almost proportionally to the number of slot machines. The draft legislation was introduced in March 2003, but the interested commercial companies attempted to legally challenge the new rules.

Eventually, in July 2007, slot machines were banned in Norway. In 2009 IVTs (interactive video terminals) were introduced. The players required to have a special card to play on them.
