= Norsk Tipping =

Norway's national lottery corporation

- Industry: Gambling
- Founded: 1948
- Headquarters: Hamar, Norway
- Key people: Åsne Havnelid (CEO)
- Number of employees: 450
- Website: norsk-tipping.no

Norsk Tipping is a Norwegian gambling company headquartered in Hamar, Norway. Founded in 1948, Norsk Tipping is owned by the Norwegian government and administered by the Norwegian Ministry of Culture. The company offers a wide range of lottery, sports and instant games in the Norwegian market. Since its foundation, the profit from the company’s operations have been channelled back to the Norwegian sport and cultural sectors.

== History ==
Football pools were the only game when the Norsk Tipping AS was founded in 1948. At that time, the organisation was run as a limited company with the Norwegian State holding 40%, the Norwegian Sports Federation 40%, and the Norwegian Football Association 20%. The profit was at first shared between sports and research projects. Today the company also raises money for cultural causes, and the surplus is divided 50/50 between sports and culture.

In 1993, the Norwegian State took full ownership of the company.

Norsk Tipping’s website was established in 1999 with results service and daily updates of the information for players. In 2001, after the webpage was tested, Norsk Tipping started to offer its products on the Internet.

In November 2005, Norsk Tipping started to provide most of the games via mobile phones.

== Games ==
The company operates the games of chance, Lotto, Viking Lotto, Keno and Joker; the games of skill Tipping and Oddsen, and the scratch card game, Flax. In addition, the company operates the TV game, Extra, on behalf of the Norwegian Foundation for Health and Rehabilitation. Norsk Tipping games are also available to play on smartphones and on their website. All games from Norsk Tipping except Flax requires the player to be registered and have a playcard.

=== Lotto ===
Lotto is a money game established in 1986 and modeled after similar games in other countries. The drawing of numbers is done every week live on NRK. In 2004, Norwegians played Lotto for 3,5 billion Norwegian kroner, making it the largest game in the country.

In the pot are 34 numbers, and of these seven are drawn as main series numbers, while one additional number is drawn for determining the second prize. Prizes are awarded for (in descending value)

1. 7 correct numbers
2. 6 correct numbers + at least 1 additional number
3. 6 correct numbers
4. 5 correct numbers
5. 4 correct numbers

Half of the income collected from people participating is distributed back as prizes. Each of the five prizes get a certain percentage of the prize fund, and the money is shared among those eligible. The profit from the lottery is spent on cultural and sports-related activities, formerly research was also funded. In the event that nobody had seven correct numbers, this portion of the prize fund is carried over to next week's draw.

The theoretical chance of winning any prize, is 1: 138, while the probability of a person winning first prize is $\frac{7!27!}{34!}$, or 1 in 5,379,616.

== See also ==
- Gambling in Norway
- Match fixing investigations of Norwegian Second Division
