= Ante Pandaković =

Croatian football coach (1890–1968)

Personal information
- Full name: Ante Pandaković
- Date of birth: 1890
- Place of birth: Zagreb, Kingdom of Croatia-Slavonia, Austria-Hungary
- Date of death: 1968 (aged 77–78)
- Place of death: Zagreb, SR Croatia, SFR Yugoslavia

Managerial career
- Years: Team
- 1926–1930: Yugoslavia

Ante Pandaković (1890–1968) was a Croatian football coach, most notably managing the national team of the Kingdom of Yugoslavia from 1926 to 1930.

== Montevideo ==
In the 2012 Serbian sports series Montevideo, God Bless You! (based on the 2010 film), Pandaković is portrayed (in one episode) by Miroslav Ćiro Blažević. The film is about the Yugoslavia national football team at the 1930 World Cup, when the players from Croatian clubs refused to join the squad after the FA's headquarters were moved from Zagreb to Belgrade, prompting Croatia-born Pandaković to step down as manager.

== Notes ==
1. Known as the Kingdom of Serbs, Croats and Slovenes until 1929.
