= Christophe Robert =

French former professional footballer (born 1964)

Personal information
- Date of birth: 30 March 1964 (age 62)
- Place of birth: Montpon-Ménestérol, France
- Height: 1.68 m (5 ft 6 in)
- Position: Striker

Senior career*
Years	Team	Apps	(Gls)
1981–1991	Nantes	191	(30)
1991–1992	Monaco	23	(4)
1992–1993	Valenciennes	29	(8)
1994–1995	Ferro Carril Oeste		
1995–1996	Louhans-Cuiseaux	36	(5)
1996–1997	Nancy	23	(1)
1997–1999	Saint-Étienne	24	(4)
Total		326	(52)
- * Club domestic league appearances and goals

Christophe Robert (born 30 March 1964) is a French former professional footballer who played as a striker.

He is famous for having been involved in the bribery scandal involving Olympique de Marseille and his team US Valenciennes. He and teammates Jorge Burruchaga and Jacques Glassmann were contacted by OM player Jean-Jacques Eydelie, in order to let l'OM win and, more importantly, not to injure any OM player ahead of the UEFA Champions League final. He was then suspended for two seasons by the French Football Federation.
