= Mauro Burruchaga =

Argentine professional footballer

Personal information
- Full name: Mauro Antonio Burruchaga
- Date of birth: 27 June 1998 (age 28)
- Place of birth: Buenos Aires, Argentina
- Height: 1.81 m (5 ft 11 in)
- Position: Midfielder

Team information
- Current team: Deportivo Morón

Youth career
- River Plate

Senior career*
Years	Team	Apps	(Gls)
2018–2020	Chievo	1	(0)
2020	Deportivo Maldonado	0	(0)
2021–2022	Albion	13	(1)
2023	Arsenal Sarandí	6	(0)
2025–	Deportivo Morón	16	(0)
- * Club domestic league appearances and goals as of 17:33, 27 April 2026 (UTC)

Mauro Antonio Burruchaga (born 27 June 1998) is an Argentine professional footballer who plays as a midfielder for Deportivo Morón.

== Club career ==
Burruchaga made his professional debut for Chievo in a 2–1 Coppa Italia loss to Cagliari Calcio on 5 December 2018.

At the end of January 2020, Burruchaga joined Uruguayan club Deportivo Maldonado. He left the club again at the end of 2020 without making his debut.

== Personal life ==
Burruchaga is the son of Argentine former footballer and FIFA World Cup winner Jorge Burruchaga.
