= Match-fixing investigations of Norwegian Second Division =

The match-fixing investigations of the Norwegian 2. divisjon association football league are two ongoing investigations that started in 2012 in Norway and in Sweden. The investigations have resulted in police charges currently pending against ten individuals. Three players from Follo FK and two players from Asker Fotball are among those charged. The police investigations are the first related to alleged match fixing in Norway.

== Timeline ==
The Norwegian Football Federation (NFF) made a police report on 9 July 2012, about alleged match fixing. Later that day Norway's then minister of culture announced that NFF, bookmaker Norsk Tipping and Norway's government will start work on a plan of action against match fixing.

Norwegian police arrested a player from Follo FK on 11 July 2012. He was charged with receiving stolen goods (siktet for heleri) and for receiving benefits/money from match fixing.

On 14 July 2012, Follo FK's trainer, Hans Erik Eriksen, admitted to having been involved in "illegal acts, linked to the same environment that is being investigated in the [alleged] match fixing case".

One player from Asker Fotball was arrested on 19 October 2012. He was charged with assisting in acts of grov corruption and assisting in grov fraud against a Norwegian bookmaker (Norsk Tipping).

The police dismissed the case against the trainer of Follo FK, on 4 October 2012.

A Swedish prosecutor (Thomas Forsberg) said on 3 December 2012, that Sweden has an investigation that is separate of Norway's investigation. In advance of this, Swedish police had arrested two inhabitants of Växjö, Sweden.

Norway's then minister of culture presented a plan against match fixing, on 11 December 2012.

Police charged another two inhabitants of Sweden on 12 December 2012. Furthermore, the police dropped match fixing charges against a licensed agent (spillkommisjonær) of bookmaker Norsk Tipping due to insufficient evidence against the agent (who had been imprisoned for two weeks during the summer of 2012, while his shop was raided by police).
