= Jacques Glassmann =

French former footballer (born 1962 mulhouse)

Personal information
- Date of birth: 22 July 1962 (age 64)
- Place of birth: Mulhouse, France
- Height: 1.82 m (6 ft 0 in)
- Position: Defender

Senior career*
Years	Team	Apps	(Gls)
1978–1984	Strasbourg	41	(2)
1984–1987	Mulhouse	97	(7)
1987–1988	Tours	32	(2)
1988–1994	Valenciennes	178	(19)
1994–1995	US Maubeuge	7	(0)
Total		348	(30)
- * Club domestic league appearances and goals

Jacques Glassmann (born 22 July 1962) is a French former footballer who played as a defender.

He is famous for having revealed the bribery scandal involving Olympique de Marseille and his team US Valenciennes. He and teammates Jorge Burruchaga and Christophe Robert were contacted by Marseille player Jean-Jacques Eydelie in order to let Marseille win and, more importantly, not to injure any Marseille player ahead of the 1993 UEFA Champions League Final.

He was eventually awarded the FIFA Fair Play Award in 1995 for having revealed this bribery scandal.

Awards
Preceded by Nándor Hidegkuti; Football Association of Zambia (1993)	FIFA Fair Play Award; 1995	Succeeded by (Liberia) George Weah
