= French football bribery scandal =

Match-fixing scandal in 1993

Affaire VA-OM
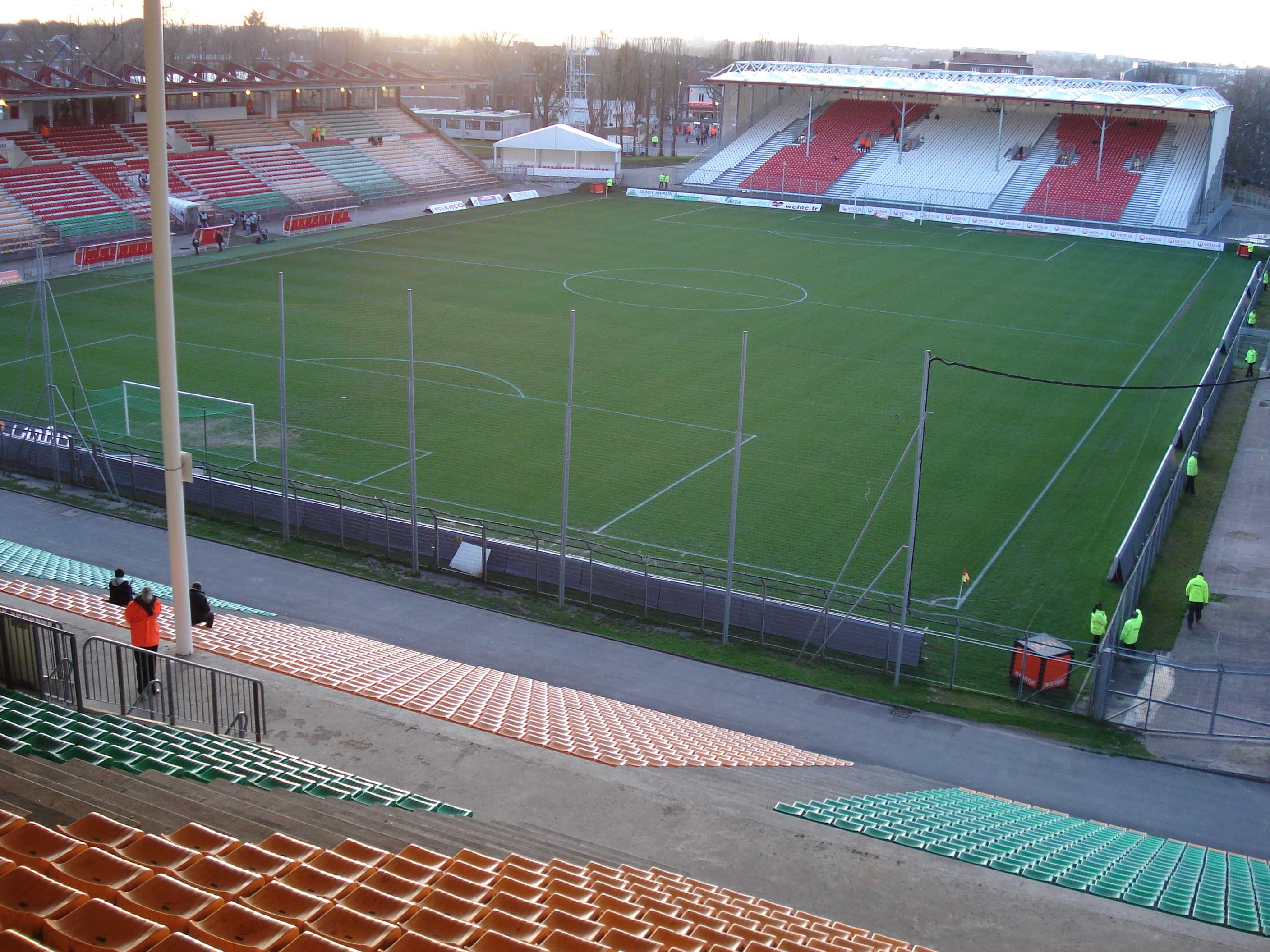
- Stade Nungesser hosted the match
- Event: 1992–93 French Division 1
Valenciennes	Marseille
0	1
- Date: 20 May 1993
- Venue: Stade Nungesser; 50.348925°N 3.526847°E, Valenciennes, France
- Referee: Jean-Marie Véniel

The French football bribery scandal (French: Affaire VA-OM) occurred during a 1992–93 French Division 1 match between Valenciennes and Olympique de Marseille. Marseille president Bernard Tapie and general manager Jean-Pierre Bernès contacted Valenciennes players Jorge Burruchaga, Jacques Glassmann, and Christophe Robert through Marseille player Jean-Jacques Eydelie, who asked them to underperform in the match so that Marseille could stay fresher for their 1993 UEFA Champions League final match against A.C. Milan six days later. Burruchaga and Robert accepted the bribe. However, Glassmann refused to partake in the bribe and was the one who publicly revealed the scandal. Glassmann was awarded the 1995 FIFA Fair Play Award for refusing to partake in the bribe.

The scandal led to the league title being taken away from Marseille, but second-placed Paris Saint-Germain declined it so no team is classed as winning the 1992–93 league title. At the subsequent trial, Tapie, Bernès, Burruchaga, Eydelie, and Robert were all convicted of corruption. Tapie and Eydelie were sentenced to jail terms, whilst Bernès, Burruchaga, and Robert all received suspended sentences.

== History ==
=== Context ===
Prior to the 1992–93 French Division 1 season, Olympique de Marseille won the previous four French Division 1 championships. They lost the 1991 European Cup Final to Red Star Belgrade with two players unavailable, a circumstance which Marseille president Bernard Tapie did not want to repeat. Marseille had qualified for the 1993 UEFA Champions League Final against A.C. Milan, following a 1–0 win over Club Brugge in the last match of the group stage. Marseille were also close to winning the French Division 1 title.

=== Organising the bribe ===
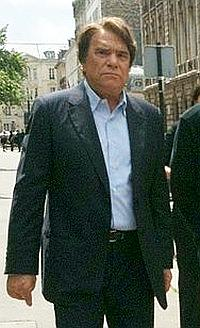
Bernard Tapie organised the bribe as a way of keeping Marseille players fresh for the 1993 UEFA Champions League Final.

In his autobiography, Valenciennes player Jacques Glassmann said that captain Christophe Robert had asked him to forfeit the Marseille match the day beforehand, 19 May. Bernard Tapie asked Marseille player Jean-Jacques Eydelie to act as a conduit to bribe Valenciennes players Glassmann, Robert and Jorge Burruchaga. In his 2006 book, Eydelie described the event: "Bernard Tapie said to us, 'It is imperative that you get in touch with your former Nantes team-mates at Valenciennes (there were two of them including Burruchaga). We don't want them acting like idiots and breaking us before the final with Milan." At around 21:00 CEST (19:00 UTC) that day, Robert spoke to Eydelie, and he later spoke to Marseille general manager Jean-Pierre Bernès. During the call, Glassmann refused to participate in the bribe, whereas the other two accepted the bribe, and an agreement was made for Robert's wife to collect the money from Eydelie. On the day of the match, Robert convinced the Valenciennes team to deliberately lose the match.

=== The match ===
The match was played at Valenciennes' home ground, Stade Nungesser, on 20 May 1993. Marseille's Alen Bokšić scored the only goal in the 21st minute. In the 23rd minute, Christophe Robert was substituted due to an alleged injury after a seemingly innocuous tackle from Éric Di Meco. Referee Jean-Marie Véniel remarked that the game was unusual because Jorge Burruchaga did not dispute any refereeing decisions, as was his normal style, whereas Glassmann spent the match running like he was trying to prove a point. At half time in the match, Glassmann told Valenciennes manager Boro Primorac about the bribe. During the second half of the match, Glassmann told Véniel about the bribe but he did not specifically name the individuals involved. Véniel spoke to the linesmen and Marseille captain Didier Deschamps about the allegations and noted them in his post-match report. Immediately after the match, police entered the Marseille locker room and questioned some Marseille players.

By winning the match, Marseille secured the 1992–93 French Division 1 title. The 1993 UEFA Champions League Final was held six days later. Marseille beat Milan 1–0, with a 43rd-minute goal from defender Basile Boli. They became the first French team to win the European Cup.

== Aftermath ==
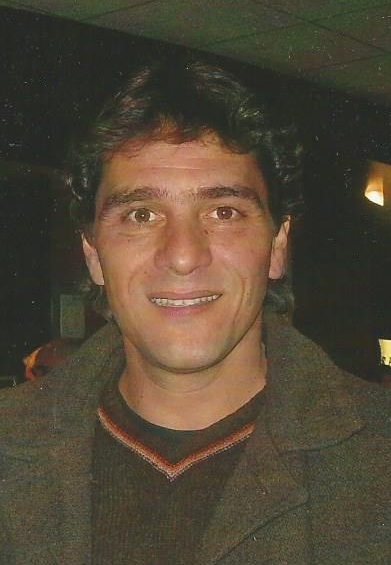
Jean-Jacques Eydelie, who was the conduit for the bribery scandal.

Two weeks after the match, Robert contacted Valenciennes magistrate Éric de Montgolfier and admitted his role in the bribery scandal. Detectives raided Robert's aunt's back garden and found F250,000. Tapie stated that the money was intended as a loan for Robert to start a restaurant, although, on 17 June, Robert admitted that the money was related to bribery. On 30 June, French police raided the headquarters of Marseille Football Club. Twelve members of the Marseille team were questioned during a pre-season training session in the Pyrenees. Eydelie admitted paying the bribe and he and Bernès were arrested and put in jail for "active corruption". Robert was later arrested in Périgueux. Christophe Robert's wife Marie-Christine admitted to collecting the bribe for Eydelie and was charged with conspiracy.

In July 1993, Bernès left his role at Marseille due to the scandal. In September, the French Football Federation (FFF) removed Marseille's French Division 1 title, and UEFA prevented Marseille from competing in the 1993–94 UEFA Champions League, the 1993 European Super Cup and the 1993 Intercontinental Cup. The FFF also suspended Eydelie, Robert and Burruchaga. The French Division 1 title was offered to runners-up Paris Saint-Germain (PSG), but they refused it so no team was classed as winning the 1992–93 title. PSG were also offered the 1993–94 UEFA Champions League spot vacated by Marseille, but they refused it because their sponsors Canal+ thought that taking the spot would cause issues with their viewers in Provence. As a result, third-placed AS Monaco took the spot instead. PSG instead competed in the 1993–94 European Cup Winners' Cup, as the winners of the 1992–93 Coupe de France.

In 1994, Tapie was ordered to resign as president of Marseille. He was replaced by Pierre Cangioni. Tapie and Bernès were banned for life by the FFF, and the players involved were banned from French football until 1 January 1996. Bernès' ban was overturned by FIFA in 1996.

Due to the bribery scandal and financial difficulties, Marseille were forcibly relegated to Division 2 for the 1994–95 season. Despite the forced relegation, Marseille were not banned from European competitions, and thus competed in the 1994–95 UEFA Cup. They lost in the second round to Sion on away goals. In 1995, the club filed for bankruptcy and was forced to spend a second season in Division 2. The club returned to Division 1 for the 1996–97 season.

In 1995, Glassmann was awarded the FIFA Fair Play Award for refusing to accept a bribe.

=== Trial ===
The trial into the bribery scandal took place in Valenciennes beginning in March 1995. During the trial, Bernès and Eydelie both admitted to corruption, and both blamed Tapie for the incident. Bernès alleged during the trial that bribery was used by the club five to six times a season. Eydelie received a reduced playing ban for testifying against Tapie. Tapie admitted to lying, but he claimed that it was in good faith. He also said that the bribe money had come from their Champions League final ticket income.

The trial's verdict was delivered on 15 May 1995. Tapie was sentenced to over two years in prison; eight months of the sentence was for match-fixing and another eighteen months for fraud in the club's accounts. Tapie was also fined ₣20,000. Tapie served six months before being given a conditional release.

Bernès, Eydelie, Robert and Burruchaga were all given prison sentences. Eydelie was given a one-year sentence, Burruchaga and Robert were given six-month suspended sentences, and Bernès was given a two-year suspended sentence and a fine.

== Other allegations ==
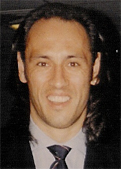
Mark Hateley alleged in 2011 that he had been offered money not to play in a 1993 match against Marseille.

Following the allegations of bribery, CSKA Moscow manager Gennadi Kostylev claimed that Marseille had tried to bribe him in a 1992–93 UEFA Champions League group stage match, although this allegation was later withdrawn.

In 2010, Rangers manager Walter Smith, who had also managed the club back in 1993, said that he believed Rangers had been cheated out of the 1993 Champions League final and a likely chance to win the trophy. In support, he offered a claim that, prior to the late April 1993 Rangers vs. CSKA match at Ibrox, he had had a conversation with CSKA head coach Kostylev who allegedly admitted to Smith that CSKA goalkeeper and players "took money" before their 6-0 loss at Marseille.

In a 2011 ITV interview, retired Rangers footballer Mark Hateley made additional claims challenging the legitimacy of Marseille's 1992–93 UEFA Champions League win by alleging to have been offered money by Marseille to not play in the 7 April 1993 Champions League match between the two sides, although Hateley ended up being suspended for the match after being sent off in Rangers' previous match against Club Brugge. Rangers eventually failed to qualify from the group stage by one goal after drawing 1–1 with Marseille in the penultimate group stage match. UEFA chose not to investigate Hateley's allegations and claimed that Marseille's ban from the 1993–94 UEFA Champions League was sufficient punishment for the club.

In 2006, Eydelie alleged that prior to the 1993 Champions League final, he and other Marseille players were given suspicious injections.

Whilst investigating the Valenciennes match, magistrate Pierre Phillipon accused Tapie of £12 million of fraud in fixing three European Cup and Champions League matches between 1989 and 1993. Tapie and his associates were found not guilty of fraud for these allegations.

Red Star Belgrade goalkeeper captain Stevan Stojanović and general secretary Vladimir Cvetković—both participants in Red Star's 1991 European Cup final win against Marseille at Stadio San Nicola in Bari two seasons prior to the scandal—alleged in the Serbian print media that they had been approached by Tapie aides before the 1991 final with monetary offers in return for letting Marseille win. Stojanović alleged he was shown an attache case containing cash in an attempt to persuade him, further adding that, upon his refusal, the same individuals turned to threats and intimidation veiled as supposedly well-intentioned advice to take the money "because [even if you don't take it] Marseille is a much better team and will win anyway at which point we'll make sure to put it out there that Red Star lost because their goalkeeper (Stojanović) took a bribe".
