= Rick Butler sexual abuse allegations =

Sexual abuse allegations in coaching

Rick Butler is a prominent youth volleyball coach and the founder of Sports Performance Volleyball Club in Aurora, Illinois. Butler has been accused of having had sexual relationships with female players in his club in the 1980s that began when he was a coach in his mid-20s. Butler has denied any wrongdoing and has never been charged with a crime.

== Background ==
Rick Butler, was the head coach of the Chicago Breeze in Major League Volleyball. He started the Sports Performance Volleyball Club in 1981. The club has since won 100 national championships.

== Sexual abuse allegations ==
In 1995, Butler was accused of having had sexual relationships with three of his female players in the 1980s. The three accusers publicly came forward and detailed how Butler allegedly engaged in inappropriate sexual relationships with them when they were under the age of 18 and he was their coach. During the time the relationships are alleged to have taken place, the legal age of consent was 16 years of age, and there were no applicable rules or laws expressly prohibiting the alleged coach/player relationships. Butler acknowledged having sexual relations with the three players, but alleges the relationships were consensual and only occurred after the players were 18 or older.

An investigation by the Illinois Department of Children and Family Services found "credible evidence" that there was a “risk of harm” to players in the program in the mid-1990s, so it kept Butler's name on file for five years but did not refer the matter to authorities or place any restrictions on his ability to coach or supervise athletes. There have not been any accusations of misconduct against Rick Butler since the 1980s.

Rick Butler and his wife, Cheryl Butler, were approved to adopt a child in 1995 after the court conducted its own investigation of the alleged misconduct. Butler was never interviewed or questioned by police, he has never faced any criminal charges, and he has stated that the allegations against him are part of "an orchestrated campaign" to damage his business and reputation.

== 2018 class action lawsuit ==
In February 2018, a class action lawsuit was brought against the Butlers and their business, GLV, Inc. The lawsuit was filed by Laura Mullen, a mother of two athletes who trained in various GLV programs between 2012 and 2017. The lawsuit alleges that the Butlers deceived Mullen and other parents and players into joining the club by concealing the alleged misconduct from the 1980s. Mullen claimed that, had she and other parents known about the prior accusations made against Butler, they would have never sent their children to play in any GLV programs.

The Butlers filed an early motion for summary judgment, arguing, in part, that the prior accusations against Butler were highly publicized since the mid-1990s, and that Mullen knew about those accusations when she registered her daughters for the Sports Performance program. The court ruled in favor of the Butlers and dismissed the case against them.

== 2021 lawsuit filed by the Butlers and GLV, Inc. ==
In December 2021, Rick Butler, Cheryl Butler, and GLV, Inc. filed a lawsuit for $250 million against Nancy Hogshead-Makar, Champion Women, Sarah Powers-Barnhard, and Deborah DiMatteo. The lawsuit alleges a conspiracy to force the Butlers out of business, claiming the defendants used the threat of negative publicity related to the allegations against Rick Butler, legal repercussions, and cancel culture to force hundreds of organizations to cut ties with the Butlers and their business.

== Reactions ==
=== USA Volleyball ===
Butler was initially banned by a USA Volleyball ethics panel from coaching girls in August 1995, but the ban was partially lifted in 2000 and Butler's membership was reinstated. The Sports Performance Girls’ Program has not participated in any USA Volleyball events since 2007. In a public statement, Butler said that USA Volleyball's 2016 action was "simply an act of retaliation for his role in growing USAV's greatest competitor, the JVA/AAU partnership."

In December 2017, Butler was banned for life by USA Volleyball after the organization determined that Butler violated a rule which prohibited him from disclosing any information about USA Volleyball's complaint against him.

After banning Butler for life in December 2017, USA Volleyball held another hearing against him in January 2018 seeking to issue another lifetime ban for the alleged misconduct from the 1980s. Butler refused to participate in the hearing, calling it a "sham". USA Volleyball held the hearing without Butler's participation and issued a second lifetime ban in January 2018. The January ban resulted from a finding that Butler violated USA Volleyball's 1995 code of conduct prohibiting its members from acting in such a fashion as to cause USA Volleyball public embarrassment or ridicule.

=== Amateur Athletic Union ===
In 2012, the Amateur Athletic Union (AAU) honored Butler with its Emil Breitkreutz Leadership Award, which is awarded to individuals showing outstanding leadership and dedication to the sport. However, in July 2015, following an Outside the Lines report on the previous allegations against him, Butler stepped down from his role as Illinois district director of the Amateur Athletic Union (AAU), and the AAU announced that it would conduct a review of its child-protection policies. In June 2016, the AAU was sued by one of Butler's accusers for allowing him to coach an under-18 team in the AAU Girls' Junior National Volleyball Championships. Butler remained a member in good standing with the AAU until February 2018.

On February 5, 2018, USA Volleyball's CEO, Jamie Davis, wrote a letter to the AAU citing the media coverage of the Butler controversy, announcing USA Volleyball's refusal to tolerate any association with Butler, and notifying the AAU that it would no longer recognize the AAU as an affiliated organization. On February 9, 2018, the AAU followed USA Volleyball and announced its decision to permanently disqualify Butler from participating in any AAU activities.

=== Junior Volleyball Association (JVA) ===
After USA Volleyball announced its ban of Butler in January 2018, the Executive Director for the Junior Volleyball Association (JVA), Jenny Hahn, publicly confirmed that Butler was still welcome in the JVA despite USA Volleyball's decision against him. However, Hahn acknowledged that the JVA would have to follow the lead of the AAU, because the AAU was responsible for sanctioning JVA's largest events. After the AAU permanently disqualified Butler from participating in its activities, the JVA followed with an indefinite suspension on Butler's participation in JVA events.

USA Volleyball issued a statement regarding the JVA's decision, stating its belief that the JVA's action against Butler was "only a result of the recent decision made by the AAU to ban Rick Butler and not a result of their belief that Mr. Butler has done any wrong."

=== Others ===
Nancy Reno, who played for Butler's club, said in 1999 that she believed Butler's initial three accusers because they had confided in her and other teammates at the time. Said Reno, "We were in denial about it because we were scared."

On May 15, 2018, a hearing was held by the State Senate Task Force on Sexual Discrimination and Harassment Awareness and Prevention to hear the testimony of two former volleyball players who have accused Butler of sexual assault.

In an April 18, 2018 letter, ESPN Wide World of Sports announced that Butler was prohibited from participating in events held at their sport complex, including the AAU Girls' Junior National Volleyball Championships.
