= 2020 Horse racing doping scam =

The 2020 Horse racing doping scam was revealed in March 2020, when the FBI cracked down several top names in horse racing. Initially, 27 people (trainers and veterinarians) were charged with doping, which later increased to 29 people.

Among the accused were the horse trainer Jason Servis, as well as the harness trainer Chris Oakes, who trained the world record champion Homicide Hunter. The FBI engaged in reconnaissance and telephone tapping for a long time, which helped prosecutors decide to prosecute. According to information, three horses in trainer Rene Allard's stable have died after ingesting illicit doping substances, and horses in Jorge Navarro's stable are also said to have died.

The defendants are risking long prison sentences and having their licenses revoked for life.

This crackdown on horse doping in 2020 also motivated congress to pass the first law establishing national regulations for the sport of horse racing. This law was Horseracing Safety and Integrity Act, which will also create a new enforcement agency to enforce the law.
