= Jean-Jacques Eydelie =

French footballer (born 1966)

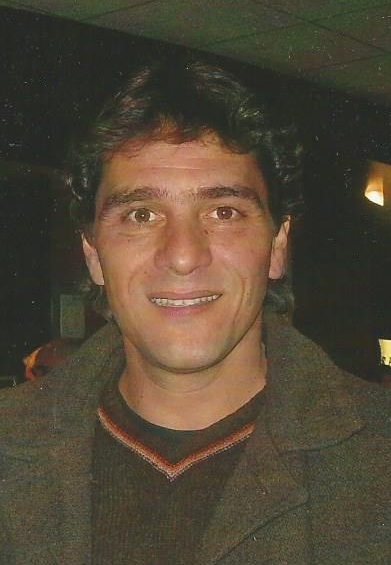
- Eydelie in 2012

Personal information
- Date of birth: 3 February 1966 (age 60)
- Place of birth: Angoulême, France
- Height: 1.70 m (5 ft 7 in)
- Position: Midfielder

Senior career*
Years	Team	Apps	(Gls)
1984–1992	Nantes	132	(5)
1986–1987	→ Laval (loan)	17	(0)
1987–1988	→ Tours (loan)	34	(3)
1992–1993	Marseille	27	(0)
1994–1995	Benfica	0	(0)
1995–1997	Bastia	53	(1)
1997–1999	Sion	29	(1)
1998	→ Walsall (loan)	11	(0)
1999–2000	FC Zürich	11	(0)
2000–2001	US Avranches	2	(0)
2001–2003	Stade Beaucairois	5	(0)
Total		321	(10)

Managerial career
- 2006–2007: Limoges
- 2009–2010: Angoulême
- 2010: Paradou
- 2012–2014: JS Bonifacio
- 2014: Africa Sports
- 2017–2018: Messager
- * Club domestic league appearances and goals

Jean-Jacques Eydelie (born 3 February 1966) is a French former professional footballer who played as a midfielder. He is most noted for his role in the Marseille 1992–93 UEFA Champions League victory.

== Career ==
Eydelie was born in Angoulême, Charente. A midfielder, he began his career with Nantes, before joining Marseille in 1992. His first season at Marseille was a success, with the club finishing top of the league, and winning the Champions League, but shortly after the Champions League final, it was revealed that he had contacted three players at Ligue 1 club Valenciennes (Jorge Burruchaga, Christophe Robert and Jacques Glassman) on behalf of the Marseille board, in order to offer bribes. Marseille needed to beat Valenciennes to secure the championship, and had induced the Valenciennes players to "go easy" in order that the Marseille players would not be overly exerted before the Champions League final. It was Glassman who reported the bribe, which resulted in Marseille being stripped of the 1993 French title, banned from defending the Champions League (although the win still stood), and relegated to Ligue 2. Eydelie was banned for a year by FIFA, given a one-year suspended sentence, and served 17 days in prison. Members of the Marseille board were given longer prison sentences, and Valenciennes players Burruchaga and Robert received FIFA bans for their involvement.

Upon his return to football, Eydelie had a nomadic career. He trained for a few months at Benfica, played in England, Switzerland and back in France before retiring in 2003.

In 2006, Eydelie released his autobiography, telling of corruption and doping during his time at Marseille. Former OM chairman Bernard Tapie sued unsuccessfully for libel, and former teammate Didier Deschamps has also threatened legal action.

== Honours ==
Marseille

- UEFA Champions League: 1992–93
