= Jorge Burruchaga =

Argentine footballer (born 1962)

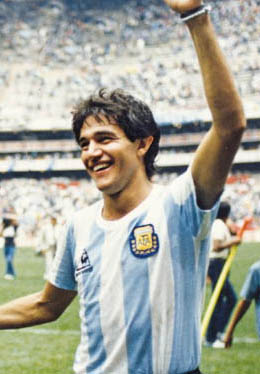
- Burruchaga celebrating after winning the 1986 FIFA World Cup

Personal information
- Full name: Jorge Luis Burruchaga
- Date of birth: 9 October 1962 (age 64)
- Place of birth: Gualeguay, Argentina
- Height: 1.77 m (5 ft 10 in)
- Positions: Attacking midfielder; second striker

Youth career
- Arsenal de Sarandí

Senior career*
Years	Team	Apps	(Gls)
1979–1981	Arsenal de Sarandí	49	(7)
1981–1985	Independiente	146	(53)
1985–1992	Nantes	140	(27)
1992–1993	Valenciennes	32	(10)
1995–1998	Independiente	89	(19)
Total		456	(116)

International career
1981	Argentina U20	2	(0)
1983–1990	Argentina	59	(13)

Managerial career
- 2002–2005: Arsenal de Sarandí
- 2005–2006: Estudiantes
- 2006–2007: Independiente
- 2008–2009: Banfield
- 2009–2010: Arsenal de Sarandí
- 2011–2012: Libertad
- 2012–2014: Atlético de Rafaela
- 2015–2016: Atlético de Rafaela
Medal record
Men's football
Representing Argentina
FIFA World Cup
Winner	1986 Mexico
Runner-up	1990 Italy
- * Club domestic league appearances and goals

Jorge Luis Burruchaga (Spanish pronunciation: [ˈxoɾxe βuruˈtʃaɣa]; born 9 October 1962), nicknamed Burru, is an Argentine association football coach and former professional football player. He played both as an attacking midfielder and forward and scored the winning goal in the final of the 1986 FIFA World Cup.

== Club career ==
Born in Gualeguay, Entre Ríos, Burruchaga started playing in 1980 for Arsenal de Sarandí in Argentina's then second division.

He contracted with Independiente in 1982 and debuted in a victory against Estudiantes de La Plata on 12 February. He was part of the team that won the Metropolitano 1983, the Copa Libertadores and the Intercontinental Cup in 1984.

He was then transferred to French team Nantes, where he played for seven years. He also played one year for Valenciennes, where he was involved in a bribing scandal involving the French and European champions Olympique de Marseille 'buying' a 1–0 league win at Valenciennes on 20 May 1993. Marseille midfielder Jean-Jacques Eydelie and the club's general manager, Jean-Pierre Bernès, had offered him money to throw the game. Burruchaga said he agreed but then changed his mind. He was subsequently given a suspended six-month jail sentence when judgment was delivered on 15 May 1995.

He returned to Argentina for his last spell in Independiente, when he won a Supercopa Sudamericana and a Recopa Sudamericana both in 1995.

He retired from professional football on 10 April 1998 in a match against Vélez Sársfield.

== International career ==
Burruchaga was part of the Argentina squad that won the 1986 FIFA World Cup, scoring two goals, including the goal that gave Argentina the 3–2 victory against West Germany in the final match. He also participated in all Argentine matches at the 1990 FIFA World Cup and scored one goal in the tournament. He scored a total of 13 goals for Argentina in 59 games from 1983 until 1990.

== Managerial career ==
Burruchaga coached Arsenal de Sarandí since its arrival to first division in 2002, and succeeded in keeping the team far from the bottom of the standings. For the 2005–06 season, he signed with Estudiantes de La Plata. In May 2006, he moved to Independiente and resigned in April 2007. He has also managed Banfield from 2008 to 2009

On 5 May 2009, Burruchaga returned to Arsenal de Sarandí but resigned in 2010. He managed Paraguayan Club Libertad since 2011. He managed Atletico Rafaela in the Argentinian Primera Division from 2012 to June 2014. In 2015, Burruchaga returned to Rafaela in his second period as a coach.

At the 2018 FIFA World Cup, Burruchaga served as Argentina national football team's general manager.

== Personal life ==
In 1995, his wife Laura Mendoza died from the injuries sustained in a car crash. Burruchaga is father of the footballer Mauro Burruchaga and tennis player Román Burruchaga.

== Career statistics ==
=== Club ===
Appearances and goals by club, season and competition
Club	Season	League			National Cup		Continental		Total	
Club	Season	Division	Apps	Goals	Apps	Goals	Apps	Goals	Apps	Goals
Arsenal de Sarandí	1980	Primera B	15	1	—		—		15	1
Arsenal de Sarandí	1981	Primera B	34	6	—		—		34	6
Arsenal de Sarandí	Total		49	7	—		—		49	7
Independiente	1982	Primera División	52	17	—		—		52	17
Independiente	1983	Primera División	55	23	—		—		55	23
Independiente	1984	Primera División	29	10	—		12	6	41	16
Independiente	1985	Primera División	10	3	—		—		10	3
Independiente	Total		146	53	—		12	6	158	59
Nantes	1985–86	Division 1	36	9	1	0	7	1	44	10
Nantes	1986–87	Division 1	30	6	1	1	2	0	33	7
Nantes	1987–88	Division 1	10	2	3	0	—		13	2
Nantes	1988–89	Division 1	6	2	3	1	—		9	3
Nantes	1989–90	Division 1	27	4	3	0	—		30	4
Nantes	1990–91	Division 1	3	0	2	0	—		5	0
Nantes	1991–92	Division 1	28	4	1	0	—		29	4
Nantes	Total		140	27	14	2	9	1	163	30
Valenciennes	1992–93	Division 1	32	10	2	1	—		34	11
Independiente	1994–95	Primera División	11	1	—		6	2	17	3
Independiente	1995–96	Primera División	27	6	—		7	1	34	7
Independiente	1996–97	Primera División	31	9	—		2	0	33	9
Independiente	1997–98	Primera División	20	3	—		5	0	25	3
Independiente	Total		89	19	—		20	3	109	22
Country	Argentina		284	79	—		32	9	316	88
Country	France		172	37	16	3	9	1	197	41
Career total			456	116	16	3	41	10	513	129

=== International ===
Appearances and goals by national team and year
National team	Year	Apps	Goals
Argentina	1983	7	3
Argentina	1984	12	2
Argentina	1985	9	3
Argentina	1986	10	2
Argentina	1987	1	1
Argentina	1988	0	0
Argentina	1989	7	0
Argentina	1990	11	2
Total		57	13

Scores and results list Argentina's goal tally first, score column indicates score after each Burruchaga goal.

List of international goals scored by Jorge Burruchaga
No.	Date	Venue	Opponent	Score	Result	Competition	Ref.
1	10 August 1983	Estadio Olímpico Atahualpa, Quito, Ecuador	Ecuador	1–0	2–2	1983 Copa América	
2	10 August 1983	Estadio Olímpico Atahualpa, Quito, Ecuador	Ecuador	2–0	2–2	1983 Copa América	
3	7 September 1983	Estadio Monumental, Buenos Aires, Argentina	Ecuador	2–2	2–2	1983 Copa América	
4	12 September 1984	Merkur Spiel-Arena, Düsseldorf, Germany	West Germany	3–0	3–1	Friendly	
5	18 September 1984	Estadio Universitario, San Nicolás de los Garza, Mexico	Mexico	1–0	1–1	Friendly	
6	5 May 1985	Arena Fonte Nova, Salvador, Brazil	Brazil	1–1	1–2	Friendly	
7	14 May 1985	Estadio Monumental, Buenos Aires, Argentina	Chile	2–0	2–0	Friendly	
8	2 June 1985	Estadio El Campín, Bogotá, Colombia	Colombia	3–1	3–1	1986 FIFA World Cup qualification	
9	10 June 1986	Estadio Olímpico Universitario, Mexico City, Mexico	Bulgaria	2–0	2–0	1986 FIFA World Cup	
10	29 June 1986	Estadio Azteca, Mexico City, Mexico	West Germany	3–2	3–2	1986 FIFA World Cup	
11	16 December 1987	José Amalfitani Stadium, Buenos Aires, Argentina	West Germany	1–0	1–0	Friendly	
12	3 May 1990	Ernst-Happel-Stadion, Vienna, Austria	Austria	1–1	1–1	Friendly	
13	13 June 1990	Stadio San Paolo, Naples, Italy	Soviet Union	2–0	2–0	1990 FIFA World Cup	

== Honours ==
=== Club ===
Independiente

- Primera División: 1983 Metropolitano
- Copa Libertadores: 1984
- Intercontinental Cup: 1984
- Supercopa Sudamericana: 1995
- Recopa Sudamericana: 1995

Nantes

- Ligue 1 runner-up: 1985–86

=== International ===
Argentina

- FIFA World Cup: 1986; runner-up: 1990

=== Individual ===
- Copa América Top Scorer: 1983
- French Division 1 Foreign Player of the Year: 1985–86
- IFFHS Argentina All Times Dream Team (Team B): 2021
