= Jean-Pierre Bernès =

French sports agent

General manager of Olympique de Marseille
- In office 1989–1994

Personal details
- Born: 1959 or 1960 (age 66–67) Salon-de-Provence, France
- Education: Sciences Po Aix
- Occupation: Football agent

Jean-Pierre Bernès (born 1959/60) is a French football agent and former football executive. He was general manager of Olympique de Marseille from 1989 to 1994, and resigned in the aftermath of the French football bribery scandal. Bernès has been an agent for multiple international footballers including Franck Ribéry and Didier Deschamps.

== Personal life ==
Bernès grew up in Salon-de-Provence. His father was in the military and his mother taught music. Bernès is a graduate of Sciences Po Aix. He currently lives in Cassis, Bouches-du-Rhône.

== Career ==
In 1980, Bernès began selling membership cards for Olympique de Marseille, in order to try and help their financial difficulties. In Autumn 1981, he joined the club working in administration. In 1989, he became the club's general manager. In 1993, Bernès was involved in the French football bribery scandal. The incident involved bribing three Valenciennes players to underperform in a match against Marseille, so that Marseille could stay fresh for their Champions League final against A.C. Milan. Bernès was involved in the phone call to arrange the bribe. In July 1993, Bernès left his role at Marseille, due to the scandal. At the trial, Bernès was given a two-year suspended sentence and a fine. In 1994, Bernès was banned for life by the French Football Federation, although the ban was overturned by FIFA in 1996.

In 1999, Bernès began working as a football agent, working with Zinedine Zidane's agent Alain Migliaccio. In 2007, Bernès became the agent for Franck Ribéry, prior to his €25 million transfer from Marseille to Bayern Munich. In the same year, he recommended Toifilou Maoulida to Bordeaux manager Laurent Blanc. In 2010, Bernès spoke to his client and Marseille coach Didier Deschamps about signing midfielder Alou Diarra, who was also a client of Bernès. In 2011, Bernès was agent to Samir Nasri when he transferred from Arsenal to Manchester City. In 2016, Bernès worked with Jocelyn Gourvennec whilst he was applying to manage at Nantes. In the same year, Bernès announced Laurent Blanc's departure from Paris Saint-Germain. In 2018, Blanc decided to terminate his contract with Bernès. Other players Bernès has been an agent for include Jérémy Ménez, Jérémy Mathieu, and Jimmy Briand.

Between 2010 and 2013, Bernès made an average of €3.6 million per year, making him the second highest paid agent in European football. In 2016, the estimated value of players represented by Bernès was €87 million. In 2018, it was suggested that Bernès was in the running for the vacant Lyon sports director role.
