= 1984–85 Paris Saint-Germain FC season =

15th season of Paris Saint-Germain

Paris Saint-Germain
1984–85 season
- President: Francis Borelli
- Manager: Georges Peyroche; Christian Coste
- Stadium: Parc des Princes
- Ligue 1: 13th
- Coupe de France: Runners-up
- UEFA Europa League: Second round
- Top goalscorer: League: Dominique Rocheteau (15); All: Dominique Rocheteau (20)
- Average home league attendance: 16,438
Home colours	Away colours

The 1984–85 season was the 15th season in the history of Paris Saint-Germain FC. PSG played their home league matches at the Parc des Princes, attracting an average of 16,438 spectators per match. The club's president was Francis Borelli. The team was managed by Georges Peyroche until March 1985, with Christian Coste taking over in April 1985. Dominique Bathenay served as captain. PSG finished thirteenth in Ligue 1, reached the final in the Coupe de France, and the second round of the UEFA Europa League. Dominique Rocheteau was the team's top scorer, netting 20 goals in all competitions, including 15 in the league.

== Players ==
=== Squad ===
Players who featured in at least one official match for the club.

Note: Flags indicate national team as defined under FIFA eligibility rules; some limited exceptions apply. Players may hold more than one non-FIFA nationality.

No.	Pos.	Nation	Player
—	GK	FRA	Dominique Baratelli
—	GK	FRA	Franck Mérelle
—	GK	FRA	Jean-Michel Moutier
—	GK	FRA	Sylvain Bied
—	DF	FRA	Dominique Bathenay (captain)
—	DF	FRA	Gérard Janvion
—	DF	FRA	Thierry Tinmar
—	DF	FRA	Yannick Guillochon
—	DF	FRA	Thierry Morin
—	DF	FRA	Jean-Marc Pilorget
—	DF	FRA	Jean-François Charbonnier
—	DF	FRA	Pascal Havet
—	DF	FRA	Philippe Jeannol
—	DF	FRA	Franck Tanasi
—	DF	FRA	Thierry Bacconnier
—	DF	FRA	Olivier Martinez

No.	Pos.	Nation	Player
—	MF	FRA	Jean-Claude Lemoult
—	MF	FRA	Luis Fernandez
—	MF	FRA	Jean-Luc Girard
—	MF	CMR	Fabrice Moreau
—	MF	FRA	Gilles Cardinet
—	MF	FRA	Gérard Lanthier
—	MF	FRA	Patrice Marquet
—	MF	YUG	Safet Sušić
—	FW	FRA	Alain Couriol
—	FW	FRA	Franck Vandecasteele
—	FW	FRA	Dominique Rocheteau
—	FW	CHA	Nambatingue Toko
—	FW	AUT	Richard Niederbacher
—	FW	CMR	William N'Jo Léa
—	FW	FRA	Laurent Pimond
—	FW	FRA	Patrice Ségura

== Transfers ==
=== Arrivals ===
Players who signed for the club.

Note: Flags indicate national team as defined under FIFA eligibility rules; some limited exceptions apply. Players may hold more than one non-FIFA nationality.

No.	Pos.	Nation	Player
—	GK	FRA	Franck Mérelle (from Cannes, end of loan)
—	GK	FRA	Jean-Michel Moutier (from Nancy)
—	GK	FRA	Sylvain Bied (from PSG Youth Academy)
—	DF	FRA	Jean-François Charbonnier (from Reims)
—	DF	FRA	Pascal Havet (from PSG Youth Academy)
—	DF	FRA	Philippe Jeannol (from Nancy)
—	DF	FRA	Thierry Tinmar (from PSG Youth Academy)
—	DF	FRA	Olivier Martinez (from PSG Youth Academy)
—	MF	FRA	Gérard Lanthier (from Auxerre)

No.	Pos.	Nation	Player
—	MF	FRA	Jean-Luc Girard (from PSG Youth Academy)
—	MF	FRA	Gilles Cardinet (from Brest, end of loan)
—	MF	FRA	Patrice Marquet (from PSG Youth Academy)
—	MF	CMR	Fabrice Moreau (from PSG Youth Academy)
—	FW	CMR	William N'Jo Léa (from Brest)
—	FW	AUT	Richard Niederbacher (from Zulte Waregem)
—	FW	FRA	Patrice Ségura (from Sète)
—	FW	FRA	Laurent Pimond (from PSG Youth Academy)
—	FW	FRA	Franck Vandecasteele (from PSG Youth Academy)

=== Departures ===
Players who left the club.

Note: Flags indicate national team as defined under FIFA eligibility rules; some limited exceptions apply. Players may hold more than one non-FIFA nationality.

No.	Pos.	Nation	Player
—	DF	FRA	Manuel Abreu (to Nancy)
—	DF	FRA	Didier Toffolo (to Mulhouse)
—	DF	FRA	Pascal Zaremba (to Lens)
—	MF	ALG	Mustapha Dahleb (to Nice)

No.	Pos.	Nation	Player
—	FW	FRA	Alain Préfaci (to Amiens)
—	FW	ALG	Salah Assad (to Mulhouse, end of loan)
—	FW	FRA	Marcel De Falco (to Laval)
—	FW	FRA	Michel N'Gom (to Auxerre)

== Kits ==
RTL was the shirt sponsor, and Le Coq Sportif was the kit supplier.

Home	Away

== Competitions ==
=== Overview ===
Competition	First match	Last match	Starting round	Final position	Record							
Competition	First match	Last match	Starting round	Final position	Pld	W	D	L	GF	GA	GD	Win %
Ligue 1	17 August 1984	28 May 1985	Matchday 1	13th	38	13	7	18	58	73	−15	34.21
Coupe de France	10 February 1985	8 June 1985	Round of 64	Runners-up	10	5	2	3	13	8	+5	50.00
UEFA Europa League	19 September 1984	8 November 1984	First round	Second round	4	1	1	2	8	7	+1	25.00
Total					52	19	10	23	79	88	−9	36.54

Source: Competitions

=== Ligue 1 ===
==== League table ====
Pos	Team	Pld	W	D	L	GF	GA	GD	Pts
11	Toulouse	38	11	13	14	43	49	−6	35
12	Nancy	38	12	10	16	52	54	−2	34
13	Paris Saint-Germain	38	13	7	18	58	73	−15	33
14	Bastia	38	11	10	17	39	68	−29	32
15	Lille	38	9	13	16	37	45	−8	31

Source: Histoire du PSG
Rules for classification: 1) points; 2) goal difference; 3) number of goals scored.
Victory: 2 points, Draw: 1 point, Defeat: 0 points

==== Results by round ====
Round	1	2	3	4	5	6	7	8	9	10	11	12	13	14	15	16	17	18	19	20	21	22	23	24	25	26	27	28	29	30	31	32	33	34	35	36	37	38
Ground	H	A	H	A	H	H	A	H	A	H	A	H	A	H	A	H	A	H	A	H	A	H	A	A	H	A	H	A	H	A	H	A	H	A	H	A	H	A
Result	L	L	D	L	D	W	L	W	W	D	L	W	L	W	W	W	D	W	W	L	L	L	L	L	L	W	W	L	L	L	D	W	D	D	L	L	W	L
Position	16	20	20	20	20	15	20	15	13	12	13	10	15	11	10	11	11	9	4	7	8	8	9	10	9	9	9	9	10	13	12	11	11	13	13	13	12	13

Source: Histoire du PSG
A = Away; H = Home; W = Win; D = Draw; L = Loss

==== Matches ====
17 August 1984 1	Paris Saint-Germain	2–4	Nancy	Paris
	Rocheteau 10'; Lemoult 16'	Report	Casini 7'; Cartier 58'; Jacques 80'; Zahoui 88'	Stadium: Parc des Princes; Attendance: 17,924; Referee: Robert Wurtz

21 August 1984 2	Lille	3–1	Paris Saint-Germain	Lille
	Savić 24', 60' (pen.); Plancque 61'	Report	Rocheteau 86'	Stadium: Stade Grimonprez-Jooris; Attendance: 11,315; Referee: Jean-Louis Rideau

24 August 1984 3	Paris Saint-Germain	0–0	Toulon	Paris
		Report		Stadium: Parc des Princes; Attendance: 16,731; Referee: Michel De Zayas

28 August 1984 4	Nantes	2–0	Paris Saint-Germain	Nantes
	Touré 47'; Amisse 69'	Report		Stadium: Stade de la Beaujoire; Attendance: 29,905; Referee: Gérard Biguet

31 August 1984 5	Paris Saint-Germain	1–1	Brest	Paris
	Rocheteau 70' (pen.)	Report	Buscher 74'	Stadium: Parc des Princes; Attendance: 20,971; Referee: Michel Vautrot

8 September 1984 6	Paris Saint-Germain	2–1	Marseille	Paris
	Bathenay 39'; N'Jo Léa 49'	Report	Zénier 50'	Stadium: Parc des Princes; Attendance: 21,820; Referee: Mohamed Benali

11 September 1984 7	Bordeaux	3–1	Paris Saint-Germain	Bordeaux
	Müller 16'; Lacombe 53'; Girard 62'	Report	Fernandez 17'	Stadium: Stade Chaban-Delmas; Attendance: 16,550; Referee: Michel Girard

22 September 1984 8	Paris Saint-Germain	7–1	Bastia	Paris
	Couriol 5'; Fernandez 19', 60'; Toko 25', 54'; Niederbacher 75'; Lemoult 86'	Report	Zimako 61'	Stadium: Parc des Princes; Attendance: 18,381; Referee: Daniel Lambert

25 September 1984 9	Tours	2–3	Paris Saint-Germain	Tours
	Da Fonseca 4'; Polaniok 78'	Report	Diecket 7' (o.g.); Toko 25'; Sušić 46'	Stadium: Stade de la Vallée du Cher; Attendance: 12,000; Referee: Jacques Ferrary

28 September 1984 10	Paris Saint-Germain	0–0	Auxerre	Paris
		Report		Stadium: Parc des Princes; Attendance: 29,847; Referee: Jean-Claude Swirog

6 October 1984 11	Metz	2–1	Paris Saint-Germain	Metz
	Bernad 53'; Bacconnier 72' (o.g.)	Report	Sušić 57'	Stadium: Stade Saint-Symphorien; Attendance: 18,964; Referee: Jean-Claude Bourgeois

16 October 1984 12	Paris Saint-Germain	4–3	Lens	Paris
	Niederbacher 9', 22'; Rocheteau 15', 89' (pen.)	Report	Vercruysse 30', 40'; Gillot 83'	Stadium: Parc des Princes; Attendance: 16,837; Referee: Georges Konrath

19 October 1984 13	Sochaux	4–1	Paris Saint-Germain	Montbéliard
	Fernier 17' (pen.); Paille 38'; Thomas 46'; Agerbeck 75'	Report	Niederbacher 8'	Stadium: Stade Auguste-Bonal; Attendance: 3,000; Referee: Gérard Biguet

27 October 1984 14	Paris Saint-Germain	3–2	Rouen	Paris
	Niederbacher 11'; Rocheteau 28', 44'	Report	Beltramini 48' (pen.), 89'	Stadium: Parc des Princes; Attendance: 13,708; Referee: Ottorino Di Bernardo

2 November 1984 15	Racing Paris	0–1	Paris Saint-Germain	Paris
		Report	Sušić 74'	Stadium: Parc des Princes; Attendance: 35,000; Referee: Michel Vautrot

13 November 1984 17	Laval	0–0	Paris Saint-Germain	Laval
		Report		Stadium: Stade Francis Le Basser; Attendance: 8,068; Referee: Michel Girard

24 November 1984 18	Paris Saint-Germain	2–1	Monaco	Paris
	Jeannol 50'; Rocheteau 62' (pen.)	Report	Genghini 37'	Stadium: Parc des Princes; Attendance: 14,955; Referee: Jean-Marie Lartigot

27 November 1984 16	Paris Saint-Germain	2–0	Strasbourg	Paris
	Lemoult 14'; Rocheteau 23'	Report		Stadium: Parc des Princes; Attendance: 12,000; Referee: Jean-Marie Sculfort

1 December 1984 19	Toulouse	0–1	Paris Saint-Germain	Toulouse
		Report	Sušić 80'	Stadium: Stadium de Toulouse; Attendance: 10,371; Referee: Georges Konrath

14 December 1984 20	Paris Saint-Germain	2–3	Lille	Paris
	Sušić 73'; Rocheteau 82'	Report	Savić 49'; Meudic 55'; Rudi Garcia 72'	Stadium: Parc des Princes; Attendance: 9,698; Referee: Gérard Biguet

21 December 1984 21	Toulon	5–1	Paris Saint-Germain	Toulon
	Onnis 18' (pen.), 58', 90'; Ricort 51'; Paganelli 61'	Report	Rocheteau 47' (pen.)	Stadium: Stade Mayol; Attendance: 12,700; Referee: Alain Delmer

26 January 1985 23	Brest	3–1	Paris Saint-Germain	Brest
	Henry 5'; Buscher 21', 33'	Report	Toko 65'	Stadium: Stade Francis-Le Blé; Attendance: 7,161; Referee: Daniel Lambert

3 February 1985 24	Marseille	3–1	Paris Saint-Germain	Marseille
	Flak 25'; La Ling 54', 61'	Report	Toko 46'	Stadium: Stade Vélodrome; Attendance: 19,878; Referee: Michel Vautrot

19 February 1985 25	Paris Saint-Germain	1–2	Bordeaux	Paris
	Toko 18'	Report	Lacombe 35'; Tigana 65'	Stadium: Parc des Princes; Attendance: 31,985; Referee: Claude Bouillet

23 February 1985 26	Bastia	1–2	Paris Saint-Germain	Furiani
	Meyer 44' (pen.)	Report	Fernandez 10', 55'	Stadium: Stade Armand-Cesari; Attendance: 2,000; Referee: Georges Konrath

1 March 1985 27	Paris Saint-Germain	2–0	Tours	Paris
	N'Jo Léa 73'; Sušić 90'	Report		Stadium: Parc des Princes; Attendance: 8,455; Referee: Jean-Claude Hirtz

5 March 1985 22	Paris Saint-Germain	2–3	Nantes	Paris
	Lemoult 44'; Rocheteau 74'	Report	Víctor Ramos 47'; Halilhodžić 58' (pen.), 79'	Stadium: Parc des Princes; Attendance: 26,015; Referee: Georges Konrath

15 March 1985 28	Auxerre	2–1	Paris Saint-Germain	Auxerre
	Garande 19', 86'	Report	Boli 27' (o.g.)	Stadium: Stade de l'Abbé-Deschamps; Attendance: 9,401; Referee: René Lopez

22 March 1985 29	Paris Saint-Germain	1–2	Metz	Paris
	Rocheteau 62' (pen.)	Report	Bocandé 59'; Kurbos 71'	Stadium: Parc des Princes; Attendance: 8,000; Referee: Germain Zagni

26 March 1985 30	Lens	4–2	Paris Saint-Germain	Lens
	Brisson 1'; Tłokiński 27'; Oudjani 60'; Vercruysse 71'	Report	Sušić 58'; N'Jo Léa 81'	Stadium: Stade Bollaert-Delelis; Attendance: 8,000; Referee: Jean-Marie Lartigot

5 April 1985 31	Paris Saint-Germain	1–1	Sochaux	Paris
	Fernandez 33'	Report	Krause 25'	Stadium: Parc des Princes; Attendance: 10,000; Referee: Mohamed Benali

12 April 1985 32	Rouen	0–1	Paris Saint-Germain	Le Petit-Quevilly
		Report	Charbonnier 46'	Stadium: Stade Robert Diochon; Attendance: 10,000; Referee: Robert Wurtz

19 April 1985 33	Paris Saint-Germain	2–2	Racing Paris	Paris
	Renaut 29' (o.g.); Sušić 77'	Report	Renaut 28'; Ekéké 75'	Stadium: Parc des Princes; Attendance: 20,000; Referee: Michel De Zayas

23 April 1985 34	Strasbourg	1–1	Paris Saint-Germain	Strasbourg
	Jenner 88'	Report	Rocheteau 2'	Stadium: Stade de la Meinau; Attendance: 7,779; Referee: Jean-Claude Bourgeois

7 May 1985 35	Paris Saint-Germain	0–1	Laval	Paris
		Report	Goudet 63'	Stadium: Parc des Princes; Attendance: 5,000; Referee: Jean-Marie Lartigot

14 May 1985 36	Monaco	4–1	Paris Saint-Germain	Monaco
	Genghini 20', 86'; Bellone 60'; Tibeuf 71'	Report	N'Jo Léa 90'	Stadium: Stade Louis II; Attendance: 7,270; Referee: Gérard Biguet

24 May 1985 37	Paris Saint-Germain	3–1	Toulouse	Paris
	Rocheteau 47'; Sušić 85', 87'	Report	Durand 31'	Stadium: Parc des Princes; Attendance: 10,000; Referee: Jean-Louis Rideau

28 May 1985 38	Nancy	6–1	Paris Saint-Germain	Tomblaine
	Picot 27' (pen.), 62'; Umpiérrez 41', 87'; Philippe 77'; Jacques 83'	Report	Pimond 46'	Stadium: Stade Marcel Picot; Attendance: 3,870; Referee: Alain Delmer

=== Coupe de France ===
==== Round of 64 ====
10 February 1985 Single leg	Montpellier	0–0 (a.e.t.) (7–8 p)	Paris Saint-Germain	Alès
		Report		Stadium: Stade Pierre Pibarot; Attendance: 12,000; Referee: Jean-Louis Rideau

==== Round of 32 ====
8 March 1985 First leg	Le Havre	2–2	Paris Saint-Germain	Le Havre
	Prieur 39' (pen.), 53'	Report	Jeannol 67'; Sušić 72'	Stadium: Stade Jules Deschaseaux; Attendance: 13,932; Referee: Daniel Lambert

12 March 1985 Second leg	Paris Saint-Germain	2–1 (4–3 agg.)	Le Havre	Paris
	Rocheteau 29'; Sušić 72'	Report	Miłoszewicz 55' (pen.)	Stadium: Parc des Princes; Attendance: 10,000; Referee: Jean-Claude Bourgeois

==== Round of 16 ====
9 April 1985 First leg	Nancy	2–1	Paris Saint-Germain	Tomblaine
	Arribart 68', 87'	Report	Toko 89'	Stadium: Stade Marcel Picot; Attendance: 8,000; Referee: Jean-Louis Rideau

16 April 1985 Second leg	Paris Saint-Germain	4–0 (5–2 agg.)	Nancy	Paris
	Sušić 54', 85'; Toko 64', 80'	Report		Stadium: Parc des Princes; Attendance: 15,000; Referee: Alain Delmer

==== Quarter-finals ====
11 May 1985 First leg	Paris Saint-Germain	1–0	Nantes	Paris
	Rocheteau 69' (pen.)	Report		Stadium: Parc des Princes; Attendance: 35,000; Referee: Georges Konrath

17 May 1985 Second leg	Nantes	0–1 (0–2 agg.)	Paris Saint-Germain	Nantes
		Report	Charbonnier 54'	Stadium: Stade de la Beaujoire; Attendance: 35,000; Referee: René Lopez

==== Semi-finals ====
31 May 1985 First leg	Toulouse	2–0	Paris Saint-Germain	Toulouse
	Stopyra 24'; Lacombe 80'	Report		Stadium: Stadium de Toulouse; Attendance: 27,184; Referee: Michel Vautrot

4 June 1985 Second leg	Paris Saint-Germain	2–0 (a.e.t.) (2–2 agg.) (5–3 p)	Toulouse	Paris
	Ségura 36'; Lanthier 60'	Report		Stadium: Parc des Princes; Attendance: 28,000; Referee: Michel Girard

==== Final ====
8 June 1985 Final	Monaco	1–0	Paris Saint-Germain	Paris
	Genghini 14'	Report		Stadium: Parc des Princes; Attendance: 45,711; Referee: Gérard Biguet

=== UEFA Europa League ===
==== First round ====
19 September 1984 First leg	Paris Saint-Germain (France)	4–0	(Scotland) Heart of Midlothian	Paris, France
20:30	Sušić 22', 57'; Rocheteau 36'; Niederbacher 62'	Report		Stadium: Parc des Princes; Attendance: 21,639; Referee: Edvard Šoštarič (Yugoslavia)

3 October 1984 Second leg	Heart of Midlothian (Scotland)	2–2 (2–6 agg.)	(France) Paris Saint-Germain	Edinburgh, Scotland
20:30	J. Robertson 27', 86'	Report	Niederbacher 10'; Jeannol 44'	Stadium: Tynecastle Park; Attendance: 10,023; Referee: Ulf Eriksson (Sweden)

==== Second round ====
24 October 1984 First leg	Paris Saint-Germain (France)	2–4	(Hungary) Videoton	Paris, France
20:30	Rocheteau 75', 83'	Report	Szabó 2', 28'; Csongrádi 54', 73'	Stadium: Parc des Princes; Attendance: 20,000; Referee: Alan Robinson (England)

8 November 1984 Second leg	Videoton (Hungary)	1–0 (5–2 agg.)	(France) Paris Saint-Germain	Székesfehérvár, Hungary
16:30	Majer 54'	Report		Stadium: Sóstói Stadion; Attendance: 25,000; Referee: Aron Schmidhuber (West Germany)

== Statistics ==
=== Appearances and goals ===
32 players featured in at least one official match, and the club scored 79 goals in official competitions, including three own goals.

Rank	Player	Position	Appearances	Goals	Source
1	(France) Jean-Claude Lemoult	MF	51	4	
2	(Socialist Federal Republic of Yugoslavia) Safet Sušić	MF	48	16	
3	(France) Gérard Lanthier	MF	46	1	
4	(France) Dominique Rocheteau	FW	44	20	
5	(France) Dominique Bathenay	DF	43	1	
6	(France) Luis Fernandez	MF	42	6	
7	(Chad) Nambatingue Toko	FW	39	9	
8	(France) Jean-Michel Moutier	GK	36	0	
9	(France) Philippe Jeannol	DF	35	3	
10	(France) Thierry Bacconnier	DF	31	0	
11	(France) Franck Tanasi	DF	28	0	
12	(France) Gérard Janvion	DF	24	0	
13	(France) Yannick Guillochon	DF	23	0	
14	(Austria) Richard Niederbacher	FW	22	7	
15	(France) Thierry Tinmar	DF	22	0	
16	(France) Jean-François Charbonnier	DF	21	2	
17	(Cameroon) William N'Jo Léa	FW	18	4	
18	(France) Alain Couriol	FW	17	1	
19	(France) Thierry Morin	DF	15	0	
20	(France) Dominique Baratelli	GK	14	0	
21	(France) Pascal Havet	DF	10	0	
22	(France) Gilles Cardinet	MF	5	0	
23	(France) Patrice Ségura	FW	4	1	
24	(France) Laurent Pimond	FW	1	1	
25	(France) Sylvain Bied	GK	1	0	
26	(France) Jean-Luc Girard	MF	1	0	
27	(France) Patrice Marquet	MF	1	0	
28	(France) Olivier Martinez	DF	1	0	
29	(France) Franck Mérelle	GK	1	0	
30	(Cameroon) Fabrice Moreau	MF	1	0	
31	(France) Jean-Marc Pilorget	DF	1	0	
32	(France) Franck Vandecasteele	FW	1	0	
