= 1985 Coupe de France final =

- Event: 1984–85 Coupe de France
Monaco	Paris Saint-Germain
1	0
- Date: 8 June 1985
- Venue: Parc des Princes, Paris
- Referee: Gérard Biguet
- Attendance: 45,711

The 1985 Coupe de France final was a football match held at Parc des Princes, Paris, on 8 June 1985 that saw AS Monaco FC defeat Paris Saint-Germain F.C. 1–0 thanks to a goal by Bernard Genghini.

== Match details ==
8 June 1985

Monaco	1–0	Paris Saint-Germain
Genghini 14'

Parc des Princes, Paris
Attendance: 45,711
Referee: Gérard Biguet

GK	(France) Jean-Luc Ettori (c)
DF	(Algeria) Abdellah Liegeon
DF	(France) Manuel Amoros
DF	(Socialist Federal Republic of Yugoslavia) Nenad Stojković
DF	(Argentina) Juan Simon
MF	(France) Dominique Bijotat
MF	(France) Bernard Genghini
MF	(France) Daniel Bravo
MF	(France) Philippe Anziani
FW	(France) Philippe Tibeuf
FW	(France) Bruno Bellone
Substitutes:
Manager:
(France) Lucien Muller

GK	(France) Jean-Michel Moutier
DF	(France) Jean-Claude Lemoult
DF	(France) Thierry Bacconier
DF	(France) Thierry Morin
DF	(France) Philippe Jeannol
MF	(France) Jean-François Charbonnier
MF	(France) Gérard Lanthier	(substituted off) 70'
MF	(France) Luis Fernandez (c)
FW	(France) Dominique Rocheteau
FW	(Socialist Federal Republic of Yugoslavia) Safet Sušić
FW	(Chad) Nabatingue Toko
Substitutes:
FW	(France) Patrice Ségura	(substituted in) 70'
Manager:
(France) Christian Coste

== See also ==
- 1984–85 Coupe de France
