= List of foreign Ligue 1 players: C =

This is a list of foreign players in the French Ligue 1, which commenced play in 1932. The following players must meet both of the following two criteria:

1. Have played at least one Ligue 1 game. Players who were signed by Ligue 1 clubs, but only played in lower league, cup and/or European games, or did not play in any competitive games at all, are not included.
2. Are considered foreign, i.e., outside France and its dependencies (Guadeloupe, Martinique, Reunion Island or French Polynesia), determined by the following:

A player is considered foreign if he is not eligible to play for the national teams of France.

More specifically,

- If a player has been capped on international level, the national team is used; if he has been capped by more than one country, the highest level (or the most recent) team is used. These include French players with dual citizenship. Players who played for France but came as foreign players (such as Miguel Ángel Lauri) are also listed.
- If a player has not been capped on international level, his country of birth is used, except those who were born abroad from French parents or moved to France at a young age, and those who clearly indicated to have switched his nationality to another nation.

Clubs listed are those that the player has played at least one Ligue 1 game for.

Seasons listed are those that the player has played at least one Ligue 1 game in. Note that seasons, not calendar years, are used. For example, "1992–95" indicates that the player has played in every season from 1992–93 to 1994–95, but not necessarily every calendar year from 1992 to 1995.

In bold: players still active in Ligue 1 and their respective teams in current season.

== Cameroon ==
- Théophile Abega – Toulouse FC – 1984–85
- Gabriel Abossolo – Bordeaux – 1959–60, 1962–69
- Vincent Aboubakar – Valenciennes, Lorient – 2010–15
- Alexis Alégué – Nantes – 2015–17, 2018–19
- Nicolas Alnoudji – Bastia – 2002–03
- Paul Alo'o Efoulou – AS Nancy – 2009–13
- Benoît Angbwa – Lille – 2004–05
- Didier Angibeaud – Le Havre – 1993–94
- Benoît Assou-Ekotto – Lens, Saint-Étienne, Metz – 2003–06, 2015–18
- Jean-Hugues Ateba – Nantes, Paris SG – 2001–06
- **Arthur Avom** – **Lorient** – 2025–
- Gustave Bahoken – Le Havre – 1999–2000
- Stéphane Bahoken – Nice, Strasbourg, Angers – 2010–13, 2017–22
- Carlos Baleba – Lille – 2022–23
- Albert Baning – Paris SG, Grenoble – 2006–07, 2008–09
- Jean-Landry Bassilekin – AS Nancy – 2012–13
- Sébastien Bassong – Metz – 2005–06, 2007–08
- Henri Bedimo – Toulouse FC, Lens, Montpellier, Lyon, Marseille – 2003–06, 2009–18
- Christian Bekamenga – Nantes – 2008–09
- Joseph-Antoine Bell – Marseille, Toulon, Bordeaux, Saint-Étienne – 1985–94
- Henri Bienvenu – Troyes – 2015–16
- Jean-Claude Billong – Clermont – 2021–22
- Romarin Billong – Lyon, Saint-Étienne – 1989–96, 1999–2000
- Morgan Bokele – Metz – 2025–26
- Gaëtan Bong – Metz, Valenciennes FC – 2005–06, 2007–08, 2009–14
- Pierre Boya – Grenoble – 2008–10
- Jean-Charles Castelletto – Brest, Nantes – 2019–25
- Aurélien Chedjou – Lille, Amiens – 2007–13, 2019–20
- Eric Maxim Choupo-Moting – Paris SG – 2018–20
- Junior Dina Ebimbe – Dijon, Paris SG, Brest – 2020–22, 2025–26
- Tristan Dingomé – Troyes, Reims – 2017–23
- Eric Djemba-Djemba – Nantes – 2001–03
- **Harouna Djibirin** – **Angers** – 2025–
- Danel Dongmo – Troyes – 2022–23
- Maurice Douala – Monaco – 1985–86
- Roudolphe Douala – Saint-Étienne – 2007–08
- Pierre Ebéde – Metz – 2007–08
- Gaspard Ebele – Montpellier – 1961–63
- Jean-Jacques Ebentsi – Le Havre – 2002–03
- Félix Eboa Eboa – Guingamp – 2017–19
- **Simon Ebonog** – **Le Havre** – 2023–
- Enzo Ebosse – Angers – 2020–22
- Samuel Edimo – Sochaux, Toulouse FC (1937), Red Star – 1958–60, 1961–66
- Jean-Emmanuel Effa Owona – Metz – 2007–08
- Eugène Ekéké – RC Paris – 1984–85
- Jacobert Ekoué – Alès – 1958–59
- Achille Emana – Toulouse FC – 2003–08
- Paul Essola – Bastia – 1999–2005
- Jean-Jacques Etamé – Strasbourg, Lille, Caen, Cannes, Bastia – 1986–88, 1992–98
- Michel Etamé – Le Havre – 1959–60
- Ernest Etchi – Lens – 1998–99
- Henri Ewane Elong – Lille – 2006–08
- Marc-Vivien Foé – Lens, Lyon – 1994–98, 2000–02
- Ignatius Ganago – Nice, Lens, Nantes – 2017–26
- Thierry Gathuessi – Montpellier – 2001–04
- Jules Goda – Gazélec Ajaccio – 2015–16
- Oumar Gonzalez – Ajaccio – 2022–23
- Samuel Ipoua – Nice, Toulouse FC – 1994–96, 1998–99
- Jean-Rémy Issembe – Nice – 1967–69
- Charles Itandje – Lens – 2002–07
- Joseph-Désiré Job – Lyon, Lens, Metz, Sedan, Nice – 1996–2000, 2001–02, 2006–08
- Michel Kaham – Valenciennes – 1980–81
- André Kana-Biyik – Metz, Le Havre – 1988–89, 1991–94
- Jean-Armel Kana-Biyik – Le Havre, Rennes, Toulouse FC, Metz – 2008–09, 2010–16, 2021–22
- Kévin Keben – Toulouse FC – 2022–24
- Olivier Kemen – Lyon – 2015–17
- Emmanuel Koum – Monaco – 1971–72, 1973–74
- Emmanuel Kundé – Laval – 1987–88
- Didier Lamkel Zé – Metz – 2021–22, 2023–24
- Charles Léa Eyoum – Rennes – 1974–75
- James Léa Siliki – Rennes – 2016–21
- Patrick Leugueun – Bordeaux, Istres – 2002–03, 2004–05
- Modeste M'Bami – Sedan, Paris SG, Marseille – 2000–09
- Claude M'Bella N'Gom – Sochaux – 1986–87
- Grégoire M'Bida – Bastia – 1982–84
- Louis-Paul M'Fédé – Rennes – 1983–84, 1985–87
- Frank Magri – Toulouse FC – 2023–26
- Marcel Mahouvé – Montpellier – 1997–2000
- Cyrille Makanaky – Toulon, Lens – 1987–90
- Jean Makoun – Lille, Lyon, Rennes – 2001–11, 2013–15
- **Rayan Mandengue** – **Auxerre** – 2026–
- Georges Mandjeck – Rennes, Metz – 2010–12, 2016–18
- Bryan Mbeumo – Troyes – 2017–18
- Stéphane Mbia – Rennes, Marseille, Toulouse FC – 2004–13, 2018–19
- Patrick Mboma – Paris SG, Metz – 1994–97
- Lucien Mettomo – Saint-Étienne – 1999-2001
- Valéry Mézague – Montpellier, Sochaux – 2001–04, 2005–07, 2008–09
- Roger Milla – Valenciennes, Monaco, Bastia, Montpellier HSC – 1977–84, 1987–89
- Marcus Mokaké – Sedan – 2006–07
- Jacques Momha – Strasbourg – 2002–05
- Fabrice Moreau – Paris SG – 1984–87, 1988–89
- Ebenezer Moudio – Le Havre – 1959–60
- Benjamin Moukandjo – Monaco, AS Nancy, Reims, Lorient – 2010–13, 2014–17
- Harold Moukoudi – Saint-Étienne – 2019–22
- **Faris Moumbagna** – **Marseille** – 2023–25, 2026–
- Guillaume Moundi – Lyon – 1963–67
- François-Régis Mughe – Marseille – 2022–24
- Cyril N'Diba – Le Havre – 2002–03
- Pius N'Diefi – Lens, Sedan – 1993–94, 1999–2003
- Joseph N'Do – Strasbourg – 1999–2000
- Frédéric N'Doumbé – Le Havre, Montpellier, Saint-Étienne – 1959–69
- Landry N'Guémo – AS Nancy, Bordeaux, Saint-Étienne – 2005–09, 2010–15
- Clinton N'Jie – Lyon, Marseille – 2012–15, 2016–19
- Eugène N'Jo Léa – Saint-Étienne, Lyon – 1954–61
- Théophile N'Tamé – Brest – 2010–11
- Patrick N'Tolla – AS Nancy – 2005–06
- **Aboubakar Nagida** – **Rennes** – 2023–
- **Danny Namaso** – **Auxerre** – 2025–
- Wilfried Ndollo Bille – Montpellier – 2024–25
- Guy Ndy Assembé – Nantes, Valenciennes, AS Nancy, Guingamp – 2008–10, 2011–14, 2016–17
- Yvan Neyou – Saint-Étienne – 2020–22
- Guy Ngosso – Angers, Amiens – 2015–16, 2017–18
- **Nathan Ngoumou** – Toulouse FC, **Nice** – 2018–20, 2022–23, 2026–
- Bernard Nguene – Nice – 2024–26
- Pierre Njanka – Strasbourg, Sedan – 1999–2003
- Georges-Kévin Nkoudou – Nantes, Marseille, Monaco – 2013–16, 2018–19
- Nicolas Nkoulou – Monaco, Marseille, Lyon – 2008–17
- Zacharie Noah – Sedan – 1957–62
- Bryan Nokoue – Saint-Étienne – 2021–22
- Jean-Jacques Nono – Montpellier – 1988–91
- Dany Nounkeu – Toulouse FC, Evian – 2009–11, 2014–15
- Jean-Pierre Nsame – Angers – 2015–16
- Olivier Ntcham – Marseille – 2020–21
- Paul-Georges Ntep – Rennes, Saint-Étienne – 2013–18
- Gerzino Nyamsi – Rennes, Strasbourg – 2017–24
- Salomon Olembé – Nantes, Marseille – 1997–2007
- François Omam-Biyik – Laval, Rennes, Cannes, Marseille, Lens – 1987–89, 1990–95
- Jean Onana – Lille, Bordeaux, Lens, Marseille – 2019–20, 2021–24
- Ambroise Oyongo – Montpellier – 2017–22
- Jean-Claude Pagal – Lens, Saint-Étienne, Martigues – 1982–89, 1990–94
- Jean-Joël Perrier-Doumbé – Auxerre, Rennes, Toulouse FC – 2000–07, 2009–10
- Alioum Saidou – Nantes – 2006–07
- Moïse Sakava – Reims – 2020–22
- Rigobert Song – Metz, Lens – 1994–98, 2002–04
- Jacques Songo'o – Toulon, Metz – 1989–92, 1993–96, 2001–02
- Kévin Soni – Bordeaux – 2015–16
- Patrick Suffo – Nantes – 1998–2000
- Adrien Tameze – Nice – 2017–20
- Bill Tchato – Montpellier, Nice – 2001–02, 2005–06
- Enzo Tchato – Montpellier – 2022–25
- Karl Toko Ekambi – Angers, Lyon, Rennes – 2016–18, 2019–23
- Jean-Pierre Tokoto – Marseille, Bordeaux, Paris SG – 1968–69, 1971–78
- Hervé Tum – Metz – 2004–06
- Franklin Wadja – Lorient – 2020–21
- Christopher Wooh – Lens, Rennes – 2021–26
- Banana Yaya – Sochaux – 2011–13
- Joseph Yegba Maya – Marseille, Valenciennes, Strasbourg – 1962–63, 1966–71, 1972–75
- **Angel Yondjo** – **Lille** – 2026–
- Darlin Yongwa – Lorient – 2022–24, 2025–26
- Wilitty Younoussa – Dijon – 2020–21
- André-Frank Zambo Anguissa – Marseille – 2015–18
- Jacques Zoua – Gazélec Ajaccio – 2015–16

== Canada ==
- Theo Bair – Auxerre – 2024–27
- **Moïse Bombito** – **Nice** – 2024–
- **Derek Cornelius** – **Marseille** – 2024–
- Jonathan David – Lille – 2020–25
- Ismaël Koné – Marseille, Rennes – 2024–25
- **Jacen Russell-Rowe** – **Toulouse** – 2025–
- **Niko Sigur** – **Toulouse** – 2026–
- Ostap Steckiw – Nice – 1948–50
- Iké Ugbo – Troyes – 2021–23

== Cape Verde ==
- Jerson Cabral – Bastia – 2016–17
- Logan Costa – Toulouse – 2022–25
- Nuno da Costa – Strasbourg, Auxerre – 2017–20, 2022–23
- Odaïr Fortes – Reims – 2012–16
- Steven Fortès – Toulouse, Lens – 2017–19, 2020–23
- Vagner Gonçalves – Saint-Étienne, Metz – 2017–18, 2020–22
- Ryan Mendes – Le Havre, Lille – 2008–09, 2012–15
- Steven Moreira – Rennes, Lorient, Toulouse – 2013–17, 2018–20
- Erin Pinheiro – Saint-Étienne – 2015–16
- Kenny Rocha – Saint-Étienne – 2016–19
- Heriberto Tavares – Brest – 2020–21
- Júlio Tavares – Dijon – 2016–20

== Central African Republic ==
- Franklin Anzité – AC Ajaccio – 2005–06
- Eloge Enza Yamissi – Troyes – 2005–07, 2012–13
- Habib Habibou – Rennes – 2014–16
- **Geoffrey Kondogbia** – Lens, Monaco, **Marseille** – 2010–11, 2013–15, 2023–
- Goduine Koyalipou – Lens, Angers – 2024–26
- **Louis Mafouta** – Metz, **Le Mans** – 2021–22, 2026–
- Frédéric Nimani – Monaco, Lorient – 2006–10
- **Edwin Quarshie** – **Le Mans** – 2026–
- Junior Sambia – Montpellier – 2017–22
- **Usman Simbakoli** – **Angers** – 2026–
- Cédric Yambéré – Bordeaux, Dijon – 2014–16, 2017–19
- Amos Youga – Gazélec Ajaccio – 2015–16

== Chad ==
- Japhet N'Doram – Nantes, Monaco – 1990–98
- Ahmad Ngouyamsa – Dijon – 2019–21
- Casimir Ninga – Montpellier, Caen, Angers – 2015–22
- Al Habo Senoussi – Nice, Rennes – 1987–88, 1990–92
- Nambatingue Toko – Nice, Bordeaux, Strasbourg, Valenciennes, Paris SG – 1975–85

== Chile ==
- Pablo Contreras – Monaco – 1999–2001
- Marco Estrada – Montpellier – 2010–13
- Alberto Fouillioux – Lille – 1974–75
- Mauricio Isla – Marseille – 2015–16
- Juan Gonzalo Lorca – Boulogne – 2009–10
- Guillermo Maripán – Monaco – 2019–24
- Damián Pizarro – Le Havre – 2025–26
- Ignacio Prieto – Lille, Laval – 1971–72, 1974–77
- Pedro Reyes – Auxerre – 1998–2001
- Fernando Riera – Reims – 1950–51
- Alexis Sánchez – Marseille – 2022–23
- Francisco Sierralta – Auxerre – 2025–26
- Gabriel Suazo – Toulouse – 2022–25
- Héctor Tapia – Lille – 2003–04

== China ==
- Li Jinyu – AS Nancy – 1998–99

== Colombia ==
- Abel Aguilar – Toulouse – 2013–16
- Víctor Bonilla – Toulouse, Nantes, Montpellier – 2000–03
- Edwin Congo – Toulouse – 2000–01
- Óscar Cortés – Lens – 2023–24
- Jhon Culma – Brest – 2011–13
- Andrés Escobar – Evian – 2013–14
- Óscar Estupiñán – Metz – 2023–24
- Radamel Falcao – Monaco – 2013–14, 2016–19
- Andrés Gómez – Rennes – 2024–25
- Fredy Guarín – Saint-Étienne – 2006–08
- Deiver Machado – Lens, Nantes – 2021–26
- Stiven Mendoza – Amiens – 2017–20
- Faryd Aly Mondragón – Metz – 2000–01
- Victor Hugo Montaño – Istres, Montpellier, Rennes – 2004–05, 2009–14
- Marlos Moreno – Troyes – 2022–23
- Tressor Moreno – Metz – 2000–02, 2003–04
- David Ospina – Nice – 2008–14
- Juan Ferney Otero – Amiens – 2018–20
- Felipe Pardo – Nantes – 2016–17
- Brayan Perea – Troyes – 2015–16
- Edixon Perea – Bordeaux – 2005–07
- Óscar Perea – Strasbourg – 2024–25
- Juan Pablo Pino – Monaco, Bastia – 2006–10, 2014–15
- Juan Fernando Quintero – Rennes – 2015–16
- Wason Rentería – Strasbourg – 2007–08
- James Rodríguez – Monaco – 2013–14
- Joao Rodríguez – Bastia – 2014–15
- Carlos Sánchez Moreno – Valenciennes – 2007–13
- Luis Suárez – Marseille – 2022–23
- Carlos Valderrama – Montpellier – 1988–91
- Alexander Viveros – Nantes – 2004–05
- Luis Yanes – Lille – 2007–08
- Mario Yepes – Nantes, Paris SG – 2001–08

== Comoros ==
- Kassim Abdallah – Marseille, Evian – 2012–15
- Nadjim Abdou – Sedan – 2006–07
- Rafidine Abdullah – Marseille, Lorient – 2012–16
- Ali Ahamada – Toulouse – 2010–16
- Chaker Alhadhur – Nantes, Caen, Ajaccio – 2013–16, 2022–23
- Aboubacar Ali Abdallah – Strasbourg – 2023–24
- Djamel Bakar – Monaco, Nancy, Montpellier – 2006–16
- El Fardou Ben Nabouhane – Le Havre – 2008–09
- Samir Bertin d'Avesnes – Bastia – 2002–04
- **Ismaël Boura** – Lens, **Troyes** – 2020–23, 2026–
- Kemal Bourhani – Guingamp, Lorient – 2001-02, 2003–04, 2006–08
- Raimane Daou – Marseille – 2023–24
- Youssouf M'Changama – AJ Auxerre – 2022–23
- Ali M'Madi – Evian – 2011–13
- Adel Mahamoud – Nantes – 2023–24
- Myziane Maolida – Lyon, Nice, Reims – 2017–23
- Warmed Omari – Rennes, Lyon – 2021–25
- Fouad Rachid – Nancy – 2010–13
- Rafiki Saïd – Brest – 2021–22
- Faïz Selemani – Lorient – 2016–17
- Mohamed Youssouf – Le Havre, Ajaccio – 2008–09, 2022–23
- Zaydou Youssouf – Bordeaux, Saint-Étienne – 2016–22
- Younn Zahary – Caen – 2018–19

== Republic of the Congo ==
- Lucien Aubey – Toulouse, Lens, Rennes – 2003–10
- Durel Avounou – Caen – 2017–18
- Tobias Badila – Nancy – 2016–17
- Dylan Bahamboula – Dijon – 2016–18
- Jean-Bertrand Balékita – Ajaccio – 1969–70
- Valentin Bamana – RC Paris – 1957–58
- Christian Bassila – Lyon, Rennes, Strasbourg – 1996–01, 2002–06
- Thievy Bifouma – Reims, Bastia – 2015–17
- Alexis Bob – Limoges – 1958–61
- Arnold Bouka Moutou – Angers, Dijon – 2015–19
- Férébory Doré – Angers – 2015–17
- Ladislas Douniama – Lorient, Guingamp – 2011–12, 2013–2015
- Oscar Ewolo – Lorient, Brest – 2006–09, 2010–12
- Jean-Jacques Ikonga – Marseille – 1958–59
- Kévin Koubemba – Lille – 2014–15
- Amine Linganzi – Saint-Étienne – 2007–08
- François M'Pelé – Ajaccio, Paris SG, Lens – 1968–73, 1974–81
- Christopher Maboulou – Bastia – 2014–16
- **Christ Makosso** – **Auxerre** – 2026–
- Béni Makouana – Montpellier – 2021–23
- Chris Malonga – Nancy, Monaco – 2007–11
- André Malouema – Sochaux – 1964–67
- Brad Mantsounga – Nice – 2025–26
- Michel Massemba – Bastia – 1982–83
- Eden Massouema – Dijon – 2017–18
- Fernand Mayembo – Ajaccio – 2022–23
- Nolan Mbemba – Lille, Reims, Le Havre – 2015–16, 2018–19, 2023–24
- Jordi Mboula – Monaco – 2017–19
- Christopher Missilou – Ajaccio – 2011–12
- Paul Moukila – Strasbourg – 1975–76
- Barel Mouko – Lille – 2012–13
- Matt Moussilou – Lille, Lens, Nice, Saint-Étienne, Marseille, Boulogne – 2001–08, 2009–10
- Bevic Moussiti-Oko – Ajaccio – 2022–23
- Delvin N'Dinga – Auxerre, Monaco – 2008–14
- Francis N'Ganga – Grenoble – 2008–09
- Exaucé Ngassaki – Caen – 2016–17
- Prince Oniangué – Rennes, Reims, Bastia, Angers, Caen – 2008–09, 2013–16, 2017–19
- Bernard Onanga Itoua – Auxerre – 2010–11
- Bryan Passi – Montpellier – 2016–17
- Morgan Poaty – Montpellier – 2016–19
- Dylan Saint-Louis – Saint-Étienne – 2016–17
- Jean-François Samba – Cannes – 1987–89
- Jules Tchimbakala – Toulouse FC – 1997–98
- Warren Tchimbembé – Metz – 2020–22
- **Melvin Zinga** – **Angers** – 2024–

== Costa Rica ==
- Joel Campbell – Lorient – 2011–12
- **Jeyland Mitchell** – **Strasbourg** – 2026–
- Keylor Navas – Paris SG – 2019–22, 2023–24
- David Ramírez – Evian – 2014–15
- John Jairo Ruiz – Lille – 2013–14
- Yeltsin Tejeda – Evian – 2014–15

== Côte d'Ivoire ==
- Simon Adingra – Monaco – 2025–26
- Emmanuel Agbadou – Reims – 2022–25
- Jean-Eudes Aholou – Strasbourg, Monaco, Saint-Étienne, Angers – 2017–23, 2024–25
- Kanga Akalé – Auxerre, Lens, Marseille – 2002–08, 2009–11
- Benjamin Akouaté – Metz – 1961–62
- Paul Akouokou – Lyon – 2023–25
- **Clément Akpa** – **Auxerre** – 2024–
- Jean-Daniel Akpa Akpro – Toulouse – 2011–17
- Victorien Angban – Metz – 2019–21
- Benjamin Angoua – Valenciennes, Guingamp – 2009–17
- Roger Assalé – Dijon – 2020–21
- Serge Aurier – Toulouse, Paris SG – 2012–17
- Georges Ba – Nice, Troyes – 2003–04, 2005–07
- Lionel Bah – Guingamp – 2002–04
- Eric Bailly – Marseille – 2022–23
- Dagui Bakari – Lille, Lens, Nancy – 2000–06
- Abdoulaye Bakayoko – Saint-Étienne – 2021–22
- Ibrahima Bakayoko – Montpellier, Marseille, Istres – 1995–98, 1999–2002, 2004–05
- Abdoulaye Bamba – Dijon, Angers – 2011–12, 2016–23, 2024–26
- Jonathan Bamba – Saint-Étienne, Angers, Lille – 2014–23
- **Mohamed Bamba** – **Lorient** – 2023–24, 2025–
- Mohamed Bamba – Reims – 2024–25
- Souleymane Bamba – Paris SG – 2004–05
- Joseph Bléziri – Bastia – 1968–70
- Jérémie Boga – Rennes, Nice – 2015–16, 2023–26
- Arthur Boka – Strasbourg – 2004–06
- Yannick Boli – Paris SG, Le Havre – 2007–09
- Willy Boly – Auxerre – 2010–12
- Aboubacar Cissé – Nîmes – 1991–92
- Faustin Coffié – Limoges – 1958–59
- Maxwel Cornet – Lyon – 2015–21
- Kafoumba Coulibaly – Nice – 2008–10
- Lasso Coulibaly – Auxerre – 2024–27
- Kouadio-Yves Dabila – Lille – 2017–19
- Eugène Dadi – Toulouse – 2000–01
- Joseph Damai – Saint-Étienne – 1958–60
- Issoumaila Dao – Toulouse – 2003–08
- Lassina Diabaté – Bordeaux, Auxerre, Ajaccio – 1997–2002, 2003–04
- Zié Diabaté – Dijon – 2011–12
- Sékana Diaby – RC Paris, Laval, Brest – 1987–91
- Oumar Diakité – Reims – 2023–25
- Hamed Modibo Diallo – Le Havre – 1997–98, 1999–2000
- Ismaël Diallo – Ajaccio – 2022–23
- Amara Diané – Strasbourg, Paris SG – 2005–08
- Stéphane Diarra – Lorient – 2020–23
- **Junior Diaz** – Brest, **Troyes** – 2025–
- Serge Dié – Nice, Metz – 2002–05
- Boris Diecket – Angers, Tours, Nantes – 1979–81, 1984–85, 1988–89
- Aruna Dindane – Lens – 2005–08
- Ismaël Diomandé – Saint-Étienne, Caen – 2011–19
- **Sinaly Diomandé** – Lyon, **Auxerre** – 2020–
- Brice Dja Djédjé – Evian, Marseille – 2011–16
- Franck Dja Djédjé – Paris SG, Grenoble, Arles-Avignon, Nice – 2003–04, 2005–06, 2008–09, 2010–11
- Koffi Djidji – Nantes – 2013–19
- Cyril Domoraud – Marseille, Bastia, Monaco – 1997–99, 2000–02
- Jean-Jacques Domoraud – Sochaux, Le Mans – 2002–04
- Guéla Doué – Rennes, Strasbourg – 2022–27
- Cheick Doukouré – Lorient, Metz – 2010–11, 2013–15, 2016–17
- Souleyman Doumbia – Rennes, Angers – 2018–23
- Didier Drogba – Guingamp, Marseille – 2002–04
- Emerse Faé – Nantes, Nice – 2003–07, 2008–12
- David Datro Fofana – Strasbourg – 2025–26
- Moryké Fofana – Lorient – 2015–17
- **Rayan Fofana** – Lens, **Le Havre** – 2024–
- Seko Fofana – Bastia, Lens, Rennes – 2015–16, 2020–23, 2024–26
- Yahia Fofana – Angers – 2022–23, 2024–25
- Yaya Fofana – Reims – 2023–25
- Youssouf Falikou Fofana – Monaco, Bordeaux – 1985–95
- Jean-Philippe Gbamin – Lens, Nantes, Metz – 2014–15, 2024–26
- Mory Gbane – Reims – 2024–25
- Yann Gboho – Rennes, Toulouse – 2020–22, 2023–27
- Gervinho – Le Mans, Lille – 2007–11
- Joris Gnagnon – Rennes – 2015–18
- Gérard Gnanhouan – Guingamp, Sochaux – 2001–05
- Michel Goba – Brest – 1982–83
- **Martial Godo** – **Strasbourg** – 2025–
- Jean-Jacques Gosso – Monaco – 2008–10
- Alain Gouaméné – Toulouse – 1997–99
- Max-Alain Gradel – Saint-Étienne, Toulouse – 2011–15, 2017–20
- Jean-Michel Guédé – Montpellier, Laval – 1987–89
- Marc-Éric Gueï – Montpellier – 1998–99
- Tchiressoua Guel – Marseille, Saint-Étienne, Lorient – 1998–2002
- Evann Guessand – Nice, Nantes – 2020–25
- Bonaventure Kalou – Auxerre, Paris SG, Lens – 2003–08
- Salomon Kalou – Lille – 2012–15
- Hassane Kamara – Reims, Nice – 2015–16, 2018–22
- Wilfried Kanga – Angers – 2017–20
- Lossémy Karaboué – Nancy, Troyes – 2011–13, 2015–16
- Benjamin Karamoko – Saint-Étienne – 2014–15, 2016–18
- Ambroise Kédié – Brest – 1979–80, 1981–83
- Abdul Kader Keita – Lille, Lyon – 2005–09
- Cédric Kipré – Reims – 2024–25
- N'Dri Philippe Koffi – Reims – 2021–22
- Ghislain Konan – Reims – 2018–22
- **Oumar Konaté** – **Monaco** – 2026–
- Amadou Koné – Reims – 2023–25
- Bakari Koné – Nice, Marseille – 2005–10
- Lamine Koné – Lorient, Strasbourg – 2010–16, 2018–21
- **Mamadou Koné** – **Lorient** – 2026–
- **Yacouba Koné** – **Troyes** – 2026–
- Augustin Kouadjo – Metz – 1961–62, 1967–68
- Christian Kouakou – Caen – 2015–16, 2017–18
- Koffi Kouao – Metz – 2023–24, 2025–26
- Blaise Kouassi – Guingamp, Troyes – 2000–04, 2005–07
- Aimé Koudou – Sochaux – 1994–95
- **Jean-Philippe Krasso** – Saint-Étienne, **Paris FC** – 2020–22, 2025–
- Éli Kroupi – Rennes, Lorient, Nancy – 1997–98, 2001–02, 2005–06
- Alban Lafont – Toulouse, Nantes – 2015–18, 2019–25
- Ange Lago – Marseille – 2025–26
- Saliou Lassissi – Rennes – 1996–98
- Serge-Alain Liri – Sedan – 2002–03
- Igor Lolo – Monaco – 2008–11
- Edgar Loué – Strasbourg – 2005–06
- Ivan M'Bahia – Clermont – 2023–24
- Habib Maïga – Saint-Étienne, Metz – 2017–18, 2019–22, 2023–24
- Abdoulaye Méïté – Marseille – 2000–06
- **Bamo Meïté** – Lorient, **Marseille**, Montpellier – 2022–
- Mohamed Kader Meïté – Rennes – 2024–26
- Yakou Méïté – Paris SG – 2015–16
- Ange-Loïc N'Gatta – Auxerre – 2024–25
- Jean N'Guessan – Metz – 2023–24
- Serge N'Guessan – Nancy – 2016–17
- Christopher Opéri – Le Havre – 2023–25
- Didier Otokoré – Auxerre, Sochaux, Cannes – 1987–94
- Abdoul Ouattara – Strasbourg – 2024–26
- Kassoum Ouattara – Monaco – 2023–26
- Mama Ouattara – Nîmes, Montpellier – 1972–74, 1981–82
- Patrick Ouotro – Strasbourg – 2023–24
- Nicolas Pépé – Angers, Lille, Nice – 2016–19, 2022–23
- Laurent Pokou – Rennes, Nancy – 1974–75, 1976–79
- Romaric – Le Mans, Bastia – 2005–08, 2013–15
- Yannick Sagbo – Monaco, Evian – 2008–13
- Moïse Sahi – Strasbourg – 2020–22, 2023–24
- Ibrahim Sangaré – Toulouse – 2016–20
- Boubacar Sanogo – Saint-Étienne – 2009–12
- Jean Michaël Seri – Nice, Bordeaux – 2015–18, 2020–21
- Donald-Olivier Sié – Toulouse – 1998–99
- Jean-Désiré Sikely – Marseille, Montpellier – 1973–75, 1978–79, 1981–82
- Wilfried Singo – Monaco – 2023–25
- Giovanni Sio – Sochaux, Bastia, Rennes, Montpellier – 2012–13, 2014–19
- Ibrahim Sissoko – Saint-Étienne – 2013–14
- Oumar Solet – Lyon – 2018–20
- Bakary Soro – Lorient, Arles-Avignon – 2008–09, 2010–11
- Abakar Sylla – Strasbourg, Nantes – 2023–26
- Junior Tallo – Ajaccio, Bastia, Lille – 2013–17
- **Christ Tapé** – **Toulouse** – 2026–
- Olivier Tébily – Châteauroux – 1997–98
- Joël Tiéhi – Le Havre, Lens, Martigues, Toulouse FC – 1987–88, 1991–98
- Siaka Tiéné – Saint-Étienne, Valenciennes, Paris SG, Montpellier – 2005–06, 2007–15
- Cheick Timité – Amiens – 2018–20
- Jean Tokpa – Alès, RC Paris – 1957–64
- Ben Hamed Touré – Ajaccio – 2022–23
- Sékou Touré – Alès, Sochaux, Montpellier, Grenoble, Nice, Nîmes – 1958–64
- Thomas Touré – Bordeaux, Angers – 2013–18
- Venn Touré – Metz – 2004–05
- Yaya Touré – Monaco – 2006–07
- Abdoulaye Traoré – Toulon – 1988–89
- Bénie Traoré – Nantes – 2023–24
- Hamed Traorè – Auxerre, Marseille – 2024–26
- Ismaël Traoré – Brest, Angers, Metz – 2012–13, 2015–22, 2023–24
- Kandia Traoré – Sochaux, Caen – 2007–09, 2010–12
- Lacina Traoré – Monaco, Amiens – 2014–16, 2017–18
- Moussa Traoré – Rennes – 1990–91
- **Elye Wahi** – Montpellier, Lens, Marseille, **Nice** – 2020–
- Ignace Wognin – Angers, Lens – 1957–63
- Gilles Yapi Yapo – Nantes – 2003–06
- **Patrick Zabi** – Reims, **Paris FC** – 2024–25, 2026–
- **Yvan Zaddy** – **Auxerre** – 2025–
- Wilfried Zaha – Lyon – 2024–25
- François Zahoui – Nancy, Toulon – 1983–92
- Patrice Zéré – Lens – 1988–89
- **Luck Zogbé** – **Brest** – 2023–
- Didier Zokora – Saint-Étienne – 2004–06
- **Aristide Zossou** – **Auxerre** – 2024–25, 2026–

== Croatia ==
- Stjepan Andrijaševic – Monaco – 1992–93
- Aljoša Asanović – Metz, Cannes, Montpellier – 1990–94
- Teo Barišić – Lyon – 2024–25
- Toma Bašić – Bordeaux – 2018–22
- Alen Bokšić – Cannes, Marseille – 1991–93
- Domagoj Bradarić – Lille – 2019–22
- Duje Ćaleta-Car – Marseille, Lyon – 2018–25
- Milan Čop – Nancy – 1970–71
- Nikica Cukrov – Toulon – 1985–86
- Damjan Đoković – Gazélec Ajaccio – 2015–16
- Salih Durkalić – Sochaux – 1979–81
- Ivo Grbić – Lille – 2021–22
- Ivan Hlevnjak – Strasbourg – 1973–75
- **Franjo Ivanović** – **Lens** – 2026–
- Marin Jakoliš – Angers – 2021–23
- Hrvoje Jukić – Valenciennes – 1967–68
- Lovre Kalinić – Toulouse FC – 2019–20
- Ivan Klasnić – Nantes – 2008–09
- Zdenko Kobeščak – Rennes – 1971–72
- Slavko Kodrnja – Antibes – 1938–39
- Ardian Kozniku – Cannes, Le Havre – 1994–97
- Jerko Leko – Monaco – 2006–10
- Ivica Liposinović – Bordeaux – 1971–74
- Dejan Lovren – Lyon – 2009–13, 2022–24
- Šime Luketin – Sochaux – 1981–82
- Lovro Majer – Rennes – 2021–23
- Antonio Mance – Nantes – 2018–19
- Marko Marić – Lille – 2007–09
- Vladimir Mataušić – Strasbourg, Red Star – 1967–68, 1969–70
- Branko Milanović – Le Havre – 1961–62
- Marko Mlinarić – Auxerre, Cannes – 1987–91
- Ivica Mornar – Rennes – 2004–05
- Ante Palaversa – Troyes – 2022–23
- Mario Pašalić – Monaco – 2015–16
- Ivan Pavlica – Metz – 1972–73
- Mateo Pavlović – Angers – 2016–21
- Nikola Perlić – Fives – 1937–38
- Saša Peršon – Cannes – 1995–97
- Ivan Petrak – Sète, Cannes, Excelsior Roubaix – 1936–39
- Vladimir Petrović – Toulouse FC – 1998–2000
- Nikola Pokrivač – Monaco – 2007–09
- Dado Pršo – Monaco – 1999–04
- Krasnodar Rora – Nancy – 1975–77
- Goran Rubil – Nantes – 1999–05
- Vedran Runje – Marseille, Lens – 2001–04, 2007–08, 2009–11
- Ivan Santini – Caen – 2016–18
- Kujtim Shala – Rennes – 1991–92
- Dario Šimić – Monaco – 2008–09
- Josip Skoblar – Marseille – 1966–67, 1969–74
- Robert Špehar – Monaco – 1997–99
- Danijel Subašić – Monaco – 2013–20
- Ivan Šuprina – Strasbourg – 1947–48
- Ivica Šurjak – Paris SG – 1981–82
- Josip Tadić – Grenoble – 2009–10
- Branko Tucak – Metz, Nancy – 1981–84
- Drago Vabec – Brest – 1979–80, 1981–83
- Zlatko Vujović – Bordeaux, Cannes, Paris SG, Sochaux – 1986–92
- Zoran Vujović – Bordeaux, Cannes – 1986–89, 1991–92
- Zoran Vulić – Nantes – 1991–93
- Aleksandar Živkovic – RC Paris, Sochaux – 1935–39

== Curaçao ==
- Charlison Benschop – Brest – 2012–13

== Cyprus ==
- Valentin Roberge – Reims – 2014–15

== Czech Republic ==
- Václav Bára – Fives – 1933–36
- Milan Baroš – Lyon – 2007–08
- Radek Bejbl – Lens – 2000–02
- František Beneš – Antibes – 1932–33
- René Bolf – Auxerre – 2004–06
- Jaroslav Bouček – Rennes – 1932–33
- Václav Bouška – Olympique Lillois – 1934–35
- Václav Brabec – Alès – 1934–35
- Vojtěch Bradáč – Sochaux – 1936–37
- Otto Bureš – Marseille, Cannes – 1946–49
- Antonín Carvan – SC Nîmes – 1932–34
- Petr Čech – Rennes – 2002–04
- Jaroslav Červený – SC Nîmes – 1934–35
- Maximilian Cyfka – Fives – 1932–33
- Václav Daněk – Le Havre – 1991–92
- Václav Drobný – Strasbourg – 2002–04
- Ludwig Dupal – Sochaux – 1947–48
- Jan Fiala – Le Havre – 1987–88
- Karel Finek – Saint-Étienne – 1946–48
- Pavel Fořt – Toulouse – 2006–07
- Jiří Hanke – Lens – 1951–52
- Ivan Hašek – Strasbourg – 1992–94
- Marek Heinz – Saint-Étienne – 2006–07
- Karel Hes – Metz, Saint-Étienne – 1936–39
- Josef Humpál – Sochaux, Strasbourg – 1947–51, 1953–55
- Miroslav Jankowski – Saint-Étienne – 1947–49
- Lukáš Jarolím – Sedan – 2002–03
- Adam Karabec – Lyon – 2025–26
- David Kobylík – Strasbourg – 2002–04
- Jan Kolaric – Alès – 1947–48
- Jan Koller – Monaco – 2006–08
- František Kolman – Cannes – 1947–48
- Vilém König – Marseille – 1934–35
- Pavel Kouba – Angoulême – 1969–72
- Tomáš Koubek – Rennes – 2017–19
- Luboš Kubík – Metz – 1991–93
- František Kuchta – SC Nîmes – 1933–35
- Karel Kudrna – Montpellier – 1932–35
- Mario Lička – Brest – 2010–13
- Karel Michlowsky – Sochaux, Saint-Étienne – 1947–48, 1949–51
- Tomáš Mičola – Brest – 2010–12
- Antonín Moudrý – Montpellier – 1933–35
- Václav Mrázek – Rennes – 1932–33
- Jozef Navra – Rennes – 1945–46
- Václav Němeček – Toulouse – 1992–94
- Jaroslav Plašil – Monaco, Bordeaux – 2001–08, 2009–19
- Lukáš Pokorný – Montpellier – 2016–17
- Tomáš Pospíchal – Rouen – 1968–70
- Vlastimil Preis – Cannes – 1947–48
- Vladar Prosek – Rennes – 1932–33
- Jaroslav Repka – Alès – 1947–48
- Milan Roeder – Lille – 1947–48
- David Rozehnal – Paris SG, Lille – 2005–07, 2010–15
- Georges Sefelin – Rennes, Fives, Sochaux – 1932–37, 1938–39
- Josef Silný – SC Nîmes – 1933–35
- Rudolf Skácel – Marseille – 2003–04
- Vladimír Šmicer – Lens, Bordeaux – 1996–99, 2005–07
- Vladimir Steigl – Rennes – 1946–47
- Jan Suchopárek – Strasbourg – 1996–99
- **Pavel Šulc** – **Lyon** – 2025–
- Václav Svěrkoš – Sochaux – 2008–11
- Ottokar Sykora – Sochaux – 1947–49
- Antonín Tichý – Sochaux, Lyon – 1947–50, 1951–52
- Štěpán Vachoušek – Marseille – 2003–04
- Ladislav Vízek – Le Havre – 1986–88
- Jaroslav Vojta – Rennes – 1932–33
- Miroslav Vratil – Marseille – 1947–48

== References and notes ==
=== Books ===
- Barreaud, Marc (1998). Dictionnaire des footballeurs étrangers du championnat professionnel français (1932-1997). L'Harmattan, Paris. ISBN 2-7384-6608-7.
- Tamás Dénes; Pál Peterdi; Zoltán Rochy; József Selmeci (1999). Kalandozó magyar labdarúgók. ISBN 963-85967-0-8.

=== Club pages ===
- AJ Auxerre former players
- AJ Auxerre former players
- Girondins de Bordeaux former players
- Girondins de Bordeaux former players
- Les ex-Tangos (joueurs), Stade Lavallois former players
- Olympique Lyonnais former players
- Olympique de Marseille former players
- FC Metz former players
- AS Monaco FC former players
- Ils ont porté les couleurs de la Paillade... Montpellier HSC Former players
- AS Nancy former players
- FC Nantes former players
- Paris SG former players
- Red Star Former players
- Red Star former players
- Stade de Reims former players
- Stade Rennais former players
- CO Roubaix-Tourcoing former players
- AS Saint-Étienne former players
- Sporting Toulon Var former players

=== Others ===
- stat2foot
- footballenfrance
- French Clubs' Players in European Cups 1955-1995, RSSSF
- Finnish players abroad, RSSSF
- Italian players abroad, RSSSF
- Romanians who played in foreign championships
- Swiss players in France, RSSSF
- EURO 2008 CONNECTIONS: FRANCE, Stephen Byrne Bristol Rovers official site

== Notes ==
1. Born in Algeria
2. Born in Austria
3. Born in Bosnia and Herzegovina (then part of Austria-Hungary)
4. Born in Bosnia and Herzegovina (then part of SFR Yugoslavia)
5. Born in Burkina Faso
6. Born in Chad
7. Born in Egypt (then Kingdom of Egypt)
8. Born in England
9. Born in France
10. Born in Germany
11. Born in Ivory Coast
12. Born in Kosovo (then part of SFR Yugoslavia)
13. Born in Mali
14. Born in Mayotte (Overseas territory of the French Republic)
15. Born in Netherlands
16. Born in Portugal
17. Born in Réunion (Overseas department of the French Republic)
18. Born in Ukraine (then part of Poland)
19. Born in the United States of America
20. Born in West Germany (now part of Germany)
21. Capped for the Bosnia and Herzegovina national under-17 football team
22. Capped for the Croatia national under-21 football team
23. Capped for the England national football team
24. Capped for the England national under-21 football team
25. Capped for the England national under-20 football team
26. Capped for the England national under-19 football team
27. Capped for the England national under-17 football team
28. Capped for the England national under-17 football team
29. Capped for the England national under-17 football team
30. Capped for the France national football team
31. Capped for the France national under-23 football team
32. Capped for the France national under-21 football team
33. Capped for the France national under-20 football team
34. Capped for the France national under-19 football team
35. Capped for the France national under-18 football team
36. Capped for the France national under-17 football team
37. Capped for the France national under-16 football team
38. Capped for the Germany national under-21 football team
39. Capped for the Germany national under-20 football team
40. Capped for the Germany national under-19 football team
41. Capped for the Germany national under-18 football team
42. Capped for the Kosovo national football team
43. Capped for the Netherlands national under-21 football team
44. Capped for the Netherlands national under-19 football team
45. Capped for the Netherlands national under-17 football team
46. Capped for the Portugal national under-21 football team
47. Capped for the Portugal national under-20 football team
