= 1983–84 Paris Saint-Germain FC season =

14th season of Paris Saint-Germain

Paris Saint-Germain
1983–84 season
- President: Francis Borelli
- Manager: Lucien Leduc; Georges Peyroche
- Stadium: Parc des Princes
- Ligue 1: 4th
- Coupe de France: Round of 64
- UEFA Cup Winners' Cup: Second round
- Top goalscorer: League: Michel N'Gom (10); All: Michel N'Gom (12)
- Average home league attendance: 23,968
Home colours	Away colours

The 1983–84 season was the 14th season in the history of Paris Saint-Germain FC. PSG played their home league matches at the Parc des Princes, attracting an average of 23,968 spectators per match. The club's president was Francis Borelli. The team was managed by Lucien Leduc until March 1984, with Georges Peyroche taking over in April 1984. Dominique Bathenay served as captain. PSG finished fourth in Ligue 1, reached the round of 64 in the Coupe de France, and the second round of the UEFA Cup Winners' Cup. Michel N'Gom was the team's top scorer, netting 12 goals in all competitions, including 10 in the league.

== Players ==
=== Squad ===
Players who featured in at least one official match for the club.

Note: Flags indicate national team as defined under FIFA eligibility rules; some limited exceptions apply. Players may hold more than one non-FIFA nationality.

No.	Pos.	Nation	Player
—	GK	FRA	Dominique Baratelli
—	DF	FRA	Dominique Bathenay (captain)
—	DF	FRA	Gérard Janvion
—	DF	FRA	Pascal Zaremba
—	DF	FRA	Yannick Guillochon
—	DF	FRA	Thierry Morin
—	DF	FRA	Jean-Marc Pilorget
—	DF	FRA	Manuel Abreu
—	DF	FRA	Franck Tanasi
—	DF	FRA	Thierry Bacconnier
—	MF	FRA	Jean-Claude Lemoult

No.	Pos.	Nation	Player
—	MF	FRA	Luis Fernandez
—	MF	ALG	Mustapha Dahleb
—	MF	YUG	Safet Sušić
—	FW	FRA	Alain Préfaci
—	FW	FRA	Alain Couriol
—	FW	FRA	Dominique Rocheteau
—	FW	ALG	Salah Assad
—	FW	CHA	Nambatingue Toko
—	FW	FRA	Michel N'Gom
—	FW	FRA	Marcel Defalco

=== Out on loan ===
Players who were loaned out to other clubs during the season.

Note: Flags indicate national team as defined under FIFA eligibility rules; some limited exceptions apply. Players may hold more than one non-FIFA nationality.

No. / Pos. / Nation / Player; — / GK / FRA / Franck Mérelle (at Cannes)	No. / Pos. / Nation / Player; — / MF / FRA / Gilles Cardinet (at Brest)

== Transfers ==
=== Arrivals ===
Players who signed for the club.

Note: Flags indicate national team as defined under FIFA eligibility rules; some limited exceptions apply. Players may hold more than one non-FIFA nationality.

No.	Pos.	Nation	Player
—	DF	FRA	Manuel Abreu (from Reims)
—	DF	FRA	Gérard Janvion (from Saint-Étienne)
—	FW	FRA	Alain Préfaci (from Thonon Evian, end of loan)

No.	Pos.	Nation	Player
—	FW	ALG	Salah Assad (on loan from Mulhouse)
—	FW	FRA	Alain Couriol (from Monaco)
—	FW	FRA	Marcel Defalco (from Marseille)

=== Departures ===
Players who left the club.

Note: Flags indicate national team as defined under FIFA eligibility rules; some limited exceptions apply. Players may hold more than one non-FIFA nationality.

No.	Pos.	Nation	Player
—	DF	FRA	Philippe Col (to Toulon)
—	FW	SEN	Boubacar Sarr (to Marseille)

No.	Pos.	Nation	Player
—	FW	NED	Kees Kist (to Mulhouse)

== Kits ==
RTL was the shirt sponsor, and Le Coq Sportif was the kit supplier.

Home	Away

== Competitions ==
=== Overview ===
Competition	First match	Last match	Starting round	Final position	Record							
Competition	First match	Last match	Starting round	Final position	Pld	W	D	L	GF	GA	GD	Win %
Ligue 1	20 July 1983	2 May 1984	Matchday 1	4th	38	18	11	9	56	37	+19	47.37
Coupe de France	28 January 1984		Round of 64	Round of 64	1	0	0	1	0	1	−1	0.00
UEFA Cup Winners' Cup	14 September 1983	2 November 1983	First round	Second round	4	2	2	0	6	4	+2	50.00
Total					43	20	13	10	62	42	+20	46.51

Source: Competitions

=== Ligue 1 ===
==== League table ====
Pos	Team	Pld	W	D	L	GF	GA	GD	Pts	Qualification or relegation
2	Monaco	38	22	10	6	58	29	+29	54	Qualification to UEFA Cup first round
3	Auxerre	38	21	7	10	59	33	+26	49	Qualification to UEFA Cup first round
4	Paris Saint-Germain	38	18	11	9	56	37	+19	47	Qualification to UEFA Cup first round
5	Toulouse	38	19	7	12	57	41	+16	45	
6	Nantes	38	18	9	11	46	32	+14	45	

Source: Histoire du PSG
Rules for classification: 1) points; 2) goal difference; 3) number of goals scored.
Victory: 2 points, Draw: 1 point, Defeat: 0 points

==== Results by round ====
Round	1	2	3	4	5	6	7	8	9	10	11	12	13	14	15	16	17	18	19	20	21	22	23	24	25	26	27	28	29	30	31	32	33	34	35	36	37	38
Ground	A	H	A	H	A	H	A	H	A	A	H	A	H	A	H	A	H	A	H	A	H	A	H	A	H	A	H	H	A	H	A	H	A	H	A	H	A	H
Result	D	W	L	W	L	W	D	L	W	W	W	W	W	D	L	W	W	D	W	L	D	W	D	D	D	W	W	L	D	W	L	D	L	D	L	W	W	W
Position	6	3	6	4	9	4	7	9	7	6	4	4	4	4	4	3	4	4	3	4	4	3	5	4	5	3	3	4	4	3	4	4	4	4	6	6	4	4

Source: Histoire du PSG
A = Away; H = Home; W = Win; D = Draw; L = Loss

==== Matches ====
20 July 1983 1	Toulouse	1–1	Paris Saint-Germain	Toulouse
	Soler 36'	Report	Bathenay 89'	Stadium: Stadium de Toulouse; Attendance: 23,217; Referee: Claude Bouillet

27 July 1983 2	Paris Saint-Germain	5–1	Toulon	Paris
	Rocheteau 6'; Fernandez 49'; Neubert 54' (o.g.); Zaremba 56'; N'Gom 85'	Report	Onnis 40' (pen.)	Stadium: Parc des Princes; Attendance: 26,175; Referee: Jacques Ferrary

3 August 1983 3	Nantes	3–1	Paris Saint-Germain	Nantes
	Pilorget 3' (o.g.); Poullain 24'; Touré 59'	Report	Zaremba 50'	Stadium: Stade Marcel-Saupin; Attendance: 22,888; Referee: Robert Wurtz

10 August 1983 4	Paris Saint-Germain	3–0	Lens	Paris
	Dahleb 23'; Rocheteau 68'; Zaremba 79'	Report		Stadium: Parc des Princes; Attendance: 41,774; Referee: Georges Konrath

17 August 1983 5	Laval	2–0	Paris Saint-Germain	Laval
	Goudet 60' (pen.); Jank 87'	Report		Stadium: Stade Francis Le Basser; Attendance: 12,818; Referee: Michel Girard

20 August 1983 6	Paris Saint-Germain	2–0	Metz	Paris
	Pilorget 76'; Sušić 81'	Report		Stadium: Parc des Princes; Attendance: 16,127; Referee: Michel Dailly

31 August 1983 7	Brest	2–2	Paris Saint-Germain	Brest
	Henry 26', 80'	Report	Rocheteau 32'; Dahleb 85'	Stadium: Stade Francis-Le Blé; Attendance: 12,069; Referee: Alain Delmer

10 September 1983 8	Paris Saint-Germain	0–1	Monaco	Paris
		Report	Genghini 16'	Stadium: Parc des Princes; Attendance: 39,244; Referee: Michel Vautrot

17 September 1983 9	Saint-Étienne	2–3	Paris Saint-Germain	Saint-Étienne
	Kupcewicz 36'; Zanon 89'	Report	Couriol 29'; N'Gom 43'; Dahleb 88'	Stadium: Stade Geoffroy-Guichard; Attendance: 15,389; Referee: Claude Bouillet

21 September 1983 10	Auxerre	1–2	Paris Saint-Germain	Auxerre
	Lanthier 73'	Report	Couriol 26'; Bathenay 72' (pen.)	Stadium: Stade de l'Abbé-Deschamps; Attendance: 14,169; Referee: Michel De Zayas

24 September 1983 11	Paris Saint-Germain	1–0	Bastia	Paris
	Sušić 40'	Report		Stadium: Parc des Princes; Attendance: 23,496; Referee: Michel Girard

1 October 1983 12	Rennes	0–1	Paris Saint-Germain	Rennes
		Report	Rocheteau 21'	Stadium: Roazhon Park; Attendance: 16,412; Referee: Robert Wurtz

8 October 1983 13	Paris Saint-Germain	3–1	Sochaux	Paris
	Zaremba 32'; Pilorget 47'; Rocheteau 49' (pen.)	Report	Fernier 80'	Stadium: Parc des Princes; Attendance: 17,177; Referee: Jean-Claude Swirog

14 October 1983 14	Nîmes	1–1	Paris Saint-Germain	Nîmes
	Nygaard 65' (pen.)	Report	Sušić 38'	Stadium: Stade Jean-Bouin; Attendance: 11,494; Referee: Georges Konrath

22 October 1983 15	Paris Saint-Germain	4–5	Lille	Paris
	Kourichi 1' (o.g.); N'Gom 33', 89'; Sušić 60'	Report	Rey 2', 56'; Bureau 29', 85'; Ricort 51'	Stadium: Parc des Princes; Attendance: 18,158; Referee: Claude Bouillet

28 October 1983 16	Nancy	1–2	Paris Saint-Germain	Tomblaine
	Jacques 68'	Report	Rocheteau 47'; N'Gom 88'	Stadium: Stade Marcel Picot; Attendance: 11,347; Referee: Michel Dailly

5 November 1983 17	Paris Saint-Germain	2–1	Bordeaux	Paris
	Pilorget 64'; Sušić 89'	Report	Giresse 12'	Stadium: Parc des Princes; Attendance: 36,551; Referee: Jean-Marie Lartigot

16 November 1983 18	Strasbourg	0–0	Paris Saint-Germain	Strasbourg
		Report		Stadium: Stade de la Meinau; Attendance: 17,431; Referee: Alain Delmer

22 November 1983 19	Paris Saint-Germain	2–0	Rouen	Paris
	Lemoult 20'; N'Gom 65'	Report		Stadium: Parc des Princes; Attendance: 20,732; Referee: René Lopez

26 November 1983 20	Toulon	1–0	Paris Saint-Germain	Toulon
	Alfano 67'	Report		Stadium: Stade Mayol; Attendance: 14,769; Referee: Michel Vautrot

3 December 1983 21	Paris Saint-Germain	0–0	Nantes	Paris
		Report		Stadium: Parc des Princes; Attendance: 33,185; Referee: Robert Wurtz

10 December 1983 22	Lens	0–3	Paris Saint-Germain	Lens
		Report	Assad 7'; N'Gom 47', 64'	Stadium: Stade Bollaert-Delelis; Attendance: 18,000; Referee: Gérard Biguet

17 December 1983 23	Paris Saint-Germain	0–0	Laval	Paris
		Report		Stadium: Parc des Princes; Attendance: 21,332; Referee: Michel Girard

14 January 1984 24	Metz	1–1	Paris Saint-Germain	Metz
	Rohr 10'	Report	Zaremba 39'	Stadium: Stade Saint-Symphorien; Attendance: 6,519; Referee: Jean-Marie Lartigot

24 January 1984 25	Paris Saint-Germain	1–1	Brest	Paris
	Zaremba 17'	Report	Le Magueresse 23'	Stadium: Parc des Princes; Attendance: 15,220; Referee: Michel Vautrot

4 February 1984 26	Monaco	0–1	Paris Saint-Germain	Monaco
		Report	Rocheteau 22' (pen.)	Stadium: Stade Louis II; Attendance: 6,119; Referee: René Lopez

11 February 1984 27	Paris Saint-Germain	3–1	Saint-Étienne	Paris
	N'Gom 11', 43'; Defalco 89'	Report	Chillet 58'	Stadium: Parc des Princes; Attendance: 26,247; Referee: Jean-Claude Boyer

25 February 1984 28	Paris Saint-Germain	1–2	Auxerre	Paris
	Lemoult 6'	Report	Garande 8'; Szarmach 86'	Stadium: Parc des Princes; Attendance: 24,113; Referee: Jean-Claude Swirog

3 March 1984 29	Bastia	1–1	Paris Saint-Germain	Furiani
	Zimako 80'	Report	Dahleb 44'	Stadium: Stade Armand-Cesari; Attendance: 3,000; Referee: Michel Girard

10 March 1984 30	Paris Saint-Germain	3–2	Rennes	Paris
	Bathenay 40'; Rocheteau 58', 59'	Report	Stopyra 7'; M'Fédé 29'	Stadium: Parc des Princes; Attendance: 14,700; Referee: Michel Vautrot

14 March 1984 31	Sochaux	2–1	Paris Saint-Germain	Montbéliard
	Fernier 9'; Anziani 42'	Report	Fernandez 84'	Stadium: Stade Auguste-Bonal; Attendance: 5,031; Referee: Michel Dailly

24 March 1984 32	Paris Saint-Germain	0–0	Nîmes	Paris
		Report		Stadium: Parc des Princes; Attendance: 12,504; Referee: Jean-Claude Bourgeois

31 March 1984 33	Lille	1–0	Paris Saint-Germain	Lille
	Plancque 84'	Report		Stadium: Stade Grimonprez-Jooris; Attendance: 9,787; Referee: Gérard Biguet

7 April 1984 34	Paris Saint-Germain	1–1	Nancy	Paris
	Fernandez 57'	Report	Casini 87'	Stadium: Parc des Princes; Attendance: 18,855; Referee: Jacques Ferrary

14 April 1984 35	Bordeaux	2–1	Paris Saint-Germain	Bordeaux
	Müller 20', 73'	Report	Sušić 31'	Stadium: Stade Chaban-Delmas; Attendance: 29,322; Referee: Claude Bouillet

25 April 1984 36	Paris Saint-Germain	2–0	Strasbourg	Paris
	Jenner 41' (o.g.); Couriol 86'	Report		Stadium: Parc des Princes; Attendance: 18,765; Referee: Michel Girard

28 April 1984 37	Rouen	0–1	Paris Saint-Germain	Le Petit-Quevilly
		Report	Sušić 38'	Stadium: Stade Robert Diochon; Attendance: 13,325; Referee: Michel Dailly

2 May 1984 38	Paris Saint-Germain	1–0	Toulouse	Paris
	Sušić 25'	Report		Stadium: Parc des Princes; Attendance: 31,075; Referee: Mohamed Benali

=== Coupe de France ===
==== Round of 64 ====
28 January 1984 Single leg	Mulhouse	1–0	Paris Saint-Germain	Strasbourg
	Six 56'	Report		Stadium: Stade de la Meinau; Attendance: 7,500; Referee: Gérard Biguet

=== UEFA Cup Winners' Cup ===
==== First round ====
14 September 1983 First leg	Glentoran (Northern Ireland)	1–2	(France) Paris Saint-Germain	Belfast, Northern Ireland
	Jameson 75'	Report	Zaremba 78'; N'Gom 84'	Stadium: The Oval; Attendance: 4,750; Referee: Alphonse Costantin (Belgium)

28 September 1983 Second leg	Paris Saint-Germain (France)	2–1 (4–2 agg.)	(Northern Ireland) Glentoran	Paris, France
	Bathenay 48' (pen.); Sušić 76'	Report	Mullan 20'	Stadium: Parc des Princes; Attendance: 20,000; Referee: Vítor Fernandes (Portugal)

==== Second round ====
19 October 1983 First leg	Paris Saint-Germain (France)	2–2	(Italy) Juventus	Paris, France
	Couriol 39'; N'Gom 90'	Report	Boniek 62'; Cabrini 76'	Stadium: Parc des Princes; Attendance: 48,776; Referee: Vojtech Christov (Czechoslovakia)

2 November 1983 Second leg	Juventus (Italy)	0–0 (2–2 (a) agg.)	(France) Paris Saint-Germain	Turin, Italy
		Report		Stadium: Stadio Olimpico Grande Torino; Attendance: 53,610; Referee: Volker Roth (West Germany)

== Statistics ==
=== Appearances and goals ===
21 players featured in at least one official match, and the club scored 62 goals in official competitions, including three own goals.

Rank	Player	Position	Appearances	Goals	Source
1	(Socialist Federal Republic of Yugoslavia) Safet Sušić	MF	43	9	
2	(France) Dominique Baratelli	GK	43	0	
3	(France) Alain Couriol	FW	41	3	
4	(France) Pascal Zaremba	DF	39	7	
5	(France) Luis Fernandez	MF	39	2	
6	(France) Jean-Claude Lemoult	MF	35	2	
7	(France) Michel N'Gom	FW	34	12	
8	(France) Dominique Rocheteau	FW	34	9	
9	(France) Franck Tanasi	DF	32	0	
10	(France) Yannick Guillochon	DF	30	0	
11	(France) Dominique Bathenay	DF	29	4	
12	(Algeria) Mustapha Dahleb	MF	28	4	
13	(France) Gérard Janvion	DF	26	0	
14	(France) Jean-Marc Pilorget	DF	25	3	
15	(France) Manuel Abreu	DF	13	0	
16	(Algeria) Salah Assad	FW	11	1	
17	(Chad) Nambatingue Toko	FW	11	0	
18	(France) Marcel Defalco	FW	4	1	
19	(France) Thierry Bacconnier	DF	3	0	
20	(France) Thierry Morin	DF	2	0	
21	(France) Alain Préfaci	FW	1	0	
