= Arthur Njo-Léa =

Swiss footballer (born 1996)

Personal information
- Date of birth: 4 June 1996 (age 30)
- Place of birth: Switzerland
- Height: 1.77 m (5 ft 10 in)
- Positions: Winger; forward

Team information
- Current team: Rodange

Youth career
- Lausanne-Sport

Senior career*
Years	Team	Apps	(Gls)
–2014	Lausanne-Sport	4	(0)
2014–2015	Rennes B	0	(0)
2016	Le Mont	13	(0)
2016–2018	Virton	48	(15)
2018–2019	Dender	27	(4)
2019	SK Londerzeel		
2020–	Rodange	13	(1)
- * Club domestic league appearances and goals as of 18:04, 8 July 2021 (UTC)

Arthur Njo-Léa (born 4 June 1996) is a Swiss professional footballer who plays as a winger or forward for Luxembourgish club Rodange.

== Career ==
Njo-Léa started his career with Swiss Super League side Lausanne-Sport, where he made four league appearances. On 4 May 2014, he made his debut in a 3–1 defeat to FC Aarau.

== Personal life ==
Njo-Léa is the grandson of former Cameroonian footballer Eugène N'Jo Léa, founder of the Union Nationale des Footballeurs Professionnels, and the son of former footballer William N'Jo Léa.
