= Francis Hédoire =

French footballer (born 1955)

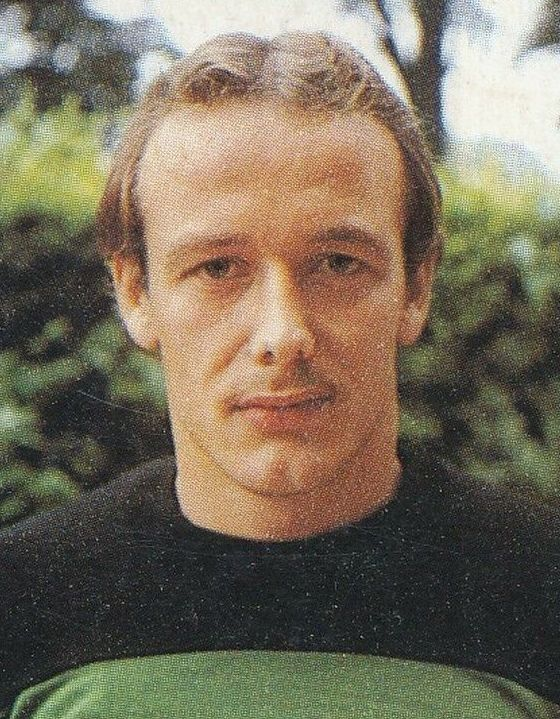
- Hédoire with Lens in 1983

Personal information
- Date of birth: 1 December 1955 (age 69)
- Place of birth: Herlies, France
- Height: 1.80 m (5 ft 11 in)
- Position(s): Goalkeeper

Senior career*
Years	Team	Apps	(Gls)
1971–1973	US Billy Berclau		
1973–1974	Dunkerque B		
1974–1978	Dunkerque	90	(0)
1978–1983	Lens	154	(0)
1983–1984	Paris Saint-Germain	0	(0)
1984–1989	Arras		
- * Club domestic league appearances and goals

Francis Hédoire (born 1 December 1955) is a French former professional footballer who played as a goalkeeper. He notably played for Dunkerque, Lens, and Paris Saint-Germain.

== Playing career ==
While playing at an amateur level with US Billy Berclau and simultaneously working as a mechanical welder in a factory, Hédoire was scouted by Dunkerque, who were then playing in the Division 2. He joined the club in 1973, initially playing for the reserve team. After several months of learning, Hédoire became a starter in Dunkerque under the order of head coach Élie Fruchart. He would go on to make a total of 90 Division 2 appearances for the club.

In 1978, Hédoire joined newly relegated Division 2 side Lens. Given the role of starting goalkeeper, he distinguished himself at the end of the 1978–79 season, during the playoffs for promotion to the Division 1. Lens had to beat Paris FC across two legs in order to be promoted; the first leg at the Parc des Princes ended in a 0–0 draw, and so did the second on 14 June 1979 at the Stade Félix-Bollaert. The match went to a penalty shoot-out, and Hédoire saved two of Paris FC's three penalties, while the other one was shot wide. After the match, Hédoire was triumphantly carried by supporters of Lens. Thanks to their goalkeeper, Lens were promoted back to the Division 1 one year after leaving it. In five years playing for the Sang et Or, Hédoire would go on to make 154 league appearances for the club, including 123 in the Division 1.

Hédoire signed for Paris Saint-Germain (PSG) in 1983, becoming the backup of Dominique Baratelli. He stayed on the bench the entire 1983–84 season before suffering an injury in an exhibition match. PSG opted not to extend his contract, and he left at the end of the season, marking the end of his professional career. He subsequently signed for amateur side Arras, where he would play until his retirement in 1989.

== Post-playing career ==
After retiring from his football career, Hédoire would coach young goalkeepers at several different clubs. In 2016, he became a goalkeeping coach at amateur club US Vermelles.

== Career statistics ==
Appearances and goals by club, season and competition
Club	Season	League			Cup		Total	
Club	Season	Division	Apps	Goals	Apps	Goals	Apps	Goals
Dunkerque	1974–75	Division 2	1	0	0	0	1	0
Dunkerque	1975–76	Division 2	34	0	5	0	39	0
Dunkerque	1976–77	Division 2	21	0	0	0	21	0
Dunkerque	1977–78	Division 2	34	0	5	0	39	0
Dunkerque	Total		90	0	10 (Note: Cup statistics while Hédoire played for Division 2 sides may be inaccurate.)	0	100	0
Lens	1978–79	Division 2	31	0	7	0	38	0
Lens	1979–80	Division 1	38	0	5	0	43	0
Lens	1980–81	Division 1	34	0	9	0	43	0
Lens	1981–82	Division 1	28	0	1	0	29	0
Lens	1982–83	Division 1	23	0	0	0	23	0
Lens	Total		154	0	22	0	176	0
Paris Saint-Germain	1983–84	Division 1	0	0	0	0	0	0
Career total			244	0	32	0	276	0
