= Sylvain Bied =

French football player and manager (1965-2011)

Personal information
- Date of birth: 26 February 1965
- Place of birth: Lyon, France
- Date of death: 18 February 2011 (aged 45)
- Place of death: Picquigny, France
- Height: 1.81 m (5 ft 11 in)
- Position: Goalkeeper

Youth career
- ASU Lyon
- Villeurbanne United F.C.
- Saint-Priest

Senior career*
Years	Team	Apps	(Gls)
1984–1985	Paris Saint-Germain	1	(0)
1985–1986	Valenciennes	7	(0)
1986–1987	Amiens	7	(0)
1987–1990	Melun	89	(0)
1990–1992	Orléans	54	(0)
1992–1995	Dijon	83	(0)
1995–1997	Angers		
1997–1999	Saint-Pryvé Saint-Hilaire		

Managerial career
- 1997–1999: Saint-Pryvé Saint-Hilaire
- 2008: CSA Montières Étouvie
- * Club domestic league appearances and goals

Sylvain Bied (26 February 1965 – 18 February 2011) was a French professional football player and manager. He played as a goalkeeper.

== Playing career ==
Bied was a product of the Paris Saint-Germain youth academy. He was the third choice goalkeeper of the first team during the 1984–85 season, while integrating the squad at the age of 19. On 26 March 1985, Bied played his first and only match for PSG, a 4–2 league loss to Lens. He conceded the opening goal of the match in the first 84 seconds of play.

Bied left PSG in the summer of 1985 to join Valenciennes. He went on to play for Amiens, Melun, Orléans, Dijon, Angers, and Saint-Pryvé Saint-Hilaire before retiring in 1999.

== Managerial career ==
Bied was player-manager for Saint-Pryvé Saint-Hilaire in the last two years of his playing career. He then spent nine years as the goalkeeping coach for Amiens, Laval, FC Ailly-sur-Somme Samara, and Beauvais. In 2008, Bied became the manager of CSA Montières Étouvie.

== Career statistics ==
Appearances and goals by club, season and competition
Club	Season	League			Cup		Total	
Club	Season	Division	Apps	Goals	Apps	Goals	Apps	Goals
Paris Saint-Germain	1984–85	Division 1	1	0	0	0	1	0
Valenciennes	1985–86	Division 2	7	0	0	0	7	0
Amiens	1986–87	Division 2	7	0	0	0	7	0
Melun	1987–88	Division 2	33	0	1	0	34	0
Orléans	1990–91	Division 2	31	0	1	0	32	0
Orléans	1991–92	Division 2	23	0	0	0	23	0
Orléans	Total		54	0	1	0	55	0
Career total			102	0	2	0	104	0
