= Olivier Martinez (footballer) =

French footballer (born 1966)

Personal information
- Date of birth: 6 October 1966 (age 60)
- Place of birth: La Garenne-Colombes, France
- Height: 1.84 m (6 ft 0 in)
- Positions: Defender; defensive midfielder

Youth career
- 1978–1985: Paris Saint-Germain

Senior career*
Years	Team	Apps	(Gls)
1985–1991	Paris Saint-Germain	3	(0)
1989–1990	→ Abbeville (loan)	28	(1)
1990–1991	Paris Saint-Germain B		
1991–1995	Charleville	52+ (Note: Statistics for the 1991–92 season are unknown.)	(0+)
Total		83+	(1+)
- * Club domestic league appearances and goals

Olivier Martinez (born 6 October 1966) is a French former professional footballer who played as a defender and defensive midfielder.

== Career ==
Martinez was a graduate of the Paris Saint-Germain Academy. He made his debut for the senior team on 28 May 1985 in a 6–1 loss to Nancy. On 1 May 1987, he played his second game for PSG, a 0–0 draw against Nancy as well. Martinez made his final appearance for the Parisian club in a 2–1 win in Le Classique over Marseille on 21 May 1988.

During the 1989–90 season, Martinez was loaned out to Abbeville in the Division 2. There, he played more matches than he did at PSG, and he scored the first goal of his professional career. On his return to Paris, he played mostly with the reserve team, before joining Charleville. Martinez would go on to play four years in Charleville before retiring at the age of 29 in 1995.

== Career statistics ==
Appearances and goals by club, season and competition
Club	Season	League			Cup		Total	
Club	Season	Division	Apps	Goals	Apps	Goals	Apps	Goals
Paris Saint-Germain	1984–85	Division 1	1	0	0	0	1	0
Paris Saint-Germain	1985–86	Division 1	0	0	0	0	0	0
Paris Saint-Germain	1986–87	Division 1	1	0	0	0	1	0
Paris Saint-Germain	1987–88	Division 1	1	0	0	0	1	0
Paris Saint-Germain	1988–89	Division 1	0	0	0	0	0	0
Paris Saint-Germain	Total		3	0	0	0	3	0
Abbeville (loan)	1989–90	Division 2	28	1	0	0	28	1
Charleville	1992–93	Division 2	26	0	0	0	26	0
Charleville	1993–94	Division 2	23	0	1	0	24	0
Charleville	1994–95	Division 2	3	0	0	0	3	0
Charleville	Total		52	0	1	0	53	0
Career total			83	1	1	0	84	1
