= Patrick Rey =

French footballer (born 1959)

Personal information
- Date of birth: 15 March 1959 (age 67)
- Place of birth: Tlemcen, French Algeria
- Height: 1.85 m (6 ft 1 in)
- Position: Left winger

Youth career
- 1967–1976: Chalon
- 1976–1979: INF Vichy

Senior career*
Years	Team	Apps	(Gls)
–1976	Chalon		
1977–1979	INF Vichy	33	(13)
1979–1984	Lille	19	(3)
1982–1983	→ Montpellier (loan)	6	(0)
1984–1985	Angers	30	(9)
1985–1986	Grenoble	26	(2)
1986–1987	Gueugnon	20	(1)
- US Mandelieu
- Antibes
- Biot
Total		134+	(27+)
- * Club domestic league appearances and goals

Patrick Rey (born 15 March 1959) is a French former professional footballer who played as a left winger. In his career, he notably played for Lille, Montpellier, Angers, Grenoble, and Gueugnon in the Division 1 and Division 2.

== Early life ==
Rey was born in Tlemcen in French Algeria. Originally from Chalon-sur-Saône, he signed for his hometown club of FC Chalon in 1967. Rey's father worked at the town's police station. Patrick recalls spending a lot of time at the Stade Léo Lagrange as a child. According to himself, all he could think about at this age was playing football. Roger Rey, the stadium's former groundskeeper, took Patrick under his wing. According to Patrick, Roger was like his "second father" and FC Chalon was like his "second family".

== Career ==
Due to scoring many goals at all youth levels, Rey made his debut for Chalon's first team in the Division d'Honneur at the age of sixteen. In 1976, he joined INF Vichy, where he would spend the next three years of his career. At INF Vichy, Rey won the Coupe Gambardella in 1978 and the Division 3 in 1979.

In 1979, following his graduation from INF Vichy, Rey joined Division 1 side Lille. Although he was loaned out to Montpellier for a season, he would go on to play several matches for Lille, including some as a starter. He was notably the architect of a 5–4 victory over Paris Saint-Germain in the 1983–84 season, scoring two goals and assisting the game-winning goal of Bernard Bureau. In 1984, Rey joined Division 2 side Angers. He played one season at the club before joining Grenoble in 1985. In 1986, Rey signed for Gueugnon, which would turn out to be the last club of his professional career.

Rey retired from professional football in 1987. However, he would continue playing at an amateur level in Southern France for several years. He played for US Mandelieu and Antibes before hanging up the boots at Biot. At Mandelieu, where he played alongside Robert Sab, Rey reached the round of 64 of the Coupe de France in the 1990–91 edition, losing 6–0 to Saint-Étienne.

== Personal life ==
Rey has stated that Lille is his favorite club. He has been invited to friendly matches played between former players of the club. After his football career, Rey became a wealth management advisor for a private firm in Valbonne.

== Honours ==
INF Vichy

- Division 3: 1978–79
- Coupe Gambardella: 1977–78
