= Franck Vandecasteele =

French footballer (born 1967)

Personal information
- Date of birth: 7 November 1967 (age 58)
- Place of birth: Rueil-Malmaison, France
- Height: 1.76 m (5 ft 9 in)
- Position: Forward

Youth career
- 1983–1985: Paris Saint-Germain

Senior career*
Years	Team	Apps	(Gls)
1985–1991	Paris Saint-Germain B		
1985–1991	Paris Saint-Germain	1	(0)
1988–1989	→ Alès (loan)	19	(2)
1989–1990	→ Abbeville (loan)	31	(3)
1991–1994	Laval	104	(30)
1994–1997	Bastia	64	(8)
1997–1998	Nice	35	(8)
1998–2001	Sochaux	20	(1)
2000–2001	Sochaux B		
2001–2003	Stade Bordelais		
Total		274+	(52+)
- * Club domestic league appearances and goals

Franck Vandecasteele (born 7 November 1967) is a French former professional footballer who played as a forward.

== Career ==
Vandecasteele is a product of the Paris Saint-Germain Academy. On 28 May 1985, he played his first and only game for the senior team, a 6–1 league loss to Nancy. After loan spells with Alès and Abbeville, Vandecasteele joined Laval, where he had the period with the most appearances as a footballer.

Vandecasteele continued his career; he went on to play for Bastia, Nice, Sochaux, and Stade Bordelais before retiring in 2003.

== After football ==
After retiring from football, Vandecasteele was hired by Peugeot. He worked in the Gironde department of France, where the city of Bordeaux is located.

== Career statistics ==
Appearances and goals by club, season and competition
Club	Season	League			Cup		Continental		Total	
Club	Season	Division	Apps	Goals	Apps	Goals	Apps	Goals	Apps	Goals
Paris Saint-Germain	1984–85	Division 1	1	0	0	0	—		1	0
Alès (loan)	1988–89	Division 2	19	2	0	0	—		19	2
Abbeville (loan)	1989–90	Division 2	31	3	0	0	—		31	3
Laval	1990–91	Division 2	30	9	1	0	—		31	9
Laval	1991–92	Division 2	33	8	5	1	—		38	9
Laval	1992–93	Division 2	41	13	3	0	—		44	13
Laval	Total		104	30	9	1	—		113	31
Bastia	1993–94	Division 1	26	5	8	1	—		34	6
Bastia	1994–95	Division 1	6	0	0	0	—		6	0
Bastia	1995–96	Division 1	32	3	3	2	—		35	5
Bastia	Total		64	8	11	3	—		75	11
Nice	1997–98	Division 2	35	8	5	0	4	1	44	9
Sochaux	1998–99	Division 1	1	0	0	0	—		1	0
Sochaux	1999–2000	Division 2	19	1	2	0	—		21	1
Sochaux	2000–01	Division 2	0	0	0	0	—		0	0
Sochaux	Total		20	1	2	0	—		22	0
Career total			274	52	27	4	4	1	305	57

== Honours ==
Bastia

- Coupe de la Ligue runner-up: 1994–95
