= Jean-Michel Moutier =

French footballer (born 1955)

Personal information
- Date of birth: 18 March 1955 (age 71)
- Place of birth: Damelevières, France
- Height: 1.74 m (5 ft 9 in)
- Position: Goalkeeper

Senior career*
Years	Team	Apps	(Gls)
1971–1972	Lunéville		
1972–1975	Nancy B		
1975–1984	Nancy	297	(0)
1984–1987	Paris Saint-Germain	26	(0)
Total		323	(0)
- * Club domestic league appearances and goals

Jean-Michel Moutier (born 18 March 1955) is a French former professional footballer who played as a goalkeeper.

== Career ==
Born in Damelevières, Moutier played for Lunéville, Nancy B, Nancy and Paris Saint-Germain.

He later worked in executive roles at Nancy, Paris Saint-Germain, Rennes, Châteauroux and the United Arab Emirates national team.
