= Fouad Rachid =

Comorian international footballer (born 1991)

Personal information
- Date of birth: 15 November 1991 (age 34)
- Place of birth: Mayotte
- Position: Midfielder

Team information
- Current team: Fola Esch
- Number: 8

Youth career
- Nancy

Senior career*
Years	Team	Apps	(Gls)
2010–2014	Nancy B	56	(2)
2010–2014	Nancy	8	(0)
2011–2012	→ Épinal (loan)	11	(0)
2015–	Fola Esch	4	(0)

International career^{‡}
2011–	Comoros	3	(0)
- * Club domestic league appearances and goals as of 6 June 2016 ‡ National team caps and goals as of 6 June 2016

Fouad Rachid (born 15 November 1991) is a Comorian international footballer who plays for Luxembourgish club Fola Esch as a midfielder.

== Career ==
Born in Mayotte, Rachid made his debut for Nancy against SM Caen on 12 March 2011, coming on as a substitute for Julien Féret in a 2–0 win. He made his first senior start on 21 August 2011 as Nancy were beaten 1–2 at home by Sochaux. On 22 December 2011, Rachid joined Championnat National side Épinal on loan until the end of the 2011–12 season.

=== International career ===
Rachid debuted with Comoros on 11 November 2011 in a 2014 FIFA World Cup qualifier match against Mozambique played in Mitsamiouli.
