= Marcel Defalco =

French football player and manager (born 1962)

Personal information
- Date of birth: 6 January 1962 (age 64)
- Place of birth: Marseille, France
- Height: 1.71 m (5 ft 7 in)
- Position: Forward

Youth career
- 1970–1974: USM Saint-Loup
- 1974–1977: USPEG
- 1977–1979: Marseille

Senior career*
Years	Team	Apps	(Gls)
1979–1983	Marseille	72	(9)
1983–1984	Paris Saint-Germain	4	(1)
1984–1985	Laval	20	(3)
1985–1986	Orléans	13	(2)
1986–1987	Béziers	19	(3)
1987–1988	Valence		
1988–1989	Stade Ruthénois	22	(2)
1989–1992	Marseille Endoume		
1992–1998	Cassis		

Managerial career
- 1998–1999: FA Val Durance
- * Club domestic league appearances and goals

Marcel Defalco (born 6 January 1962) is a French former professional football player and manager.

== Playing career ==
Marcel Defalco was a graduate of the Marseille academy. He made a total of 82 appearances for the club before joining Paris Saint-Germain in 1983, at the age of 21.

Defalco made his PSG debut in a 0–0 draw against his future club Laval on 27 December 1983. He scored his first and only goal for the Parisians in a 3–1 victory against Saint-Étienne on 11 February 1984. On 14 March 1984, Defalco played his final match for PSG, a 2–1 defeat to Sochaux. He transferred to Laval in the summer of 1984, after a "disappointing" season in the capital of France.

After leaving Laval in 1985, Defalco continued his career at Orléans, Béziers, Valence, Stade Ruthénois, Marseille Endoume, and Cassis.

== Managerial career ==
After retiring in 1998, Defalco went on to manage FA Val Durance.

== Career statistics ==
Appearances and goals by club, season and competition
Club	Season	League			Cup		Total	
Club	Season	Division	Apps	Goals	Apps	Goals	Apps	Goals
Marseille	1979–80	Division 1	1	0	0	0	1	0
Marseille	1980–81	Division 2	17	2	0	0	17	2
Marseille	1981–82	Division 2	30	5	6	2	36	7
Marseille	1982–83	Division 2	24	2	4	0	28	2
Marseille	Total		72	9	10	2	82	11
Paris Saint-Germain	1983–84	Division 1	4	1	0	0	4	1
Laval	1984–85	Division 1	20	3	0	0	20	3
Orléans	1985–86	Division 2	13	2	0	0	13	2
Béziers	1986–87	Division 2	19	3	0	0	19	3
Stade Ruthénois	1988–89	Division 2	22	2	0	0	22	2
Career total			150	20	10	2	160	22
