= 1978–79 French Division 2 =

40th season of the second-tier football league in France

Division 2
- Season: 1978–79

Statistics of Division 2 in the 1978/1979 season.

== Overview ==
It was contested by 36 teams, and Gueugnon and Stade Brest won the championship.

== League tables ==
=== Group A ===
Pos	Team	Pld	W	D	L	GF	GA	GD	Pts	Promotion or relegation
1	Gueugnon	34	18	10	6	68	40	+28	46	
2	Avignon	34	19	8	7	47	27	+20	46	
3	Béziers	34	19	5	10	55	31	+24	43	
4	Auxerre	34	19	4	11	56	38	+18	42	
5	Besançon	34	18	6	10	45	28	+17	42	
6	Montpellier	34	17	6	11	57	43	+14	40	
7	Martigues	34	16	5	13	62	49	+13	37	
8	Cannes	34	13	10	11	38	40	−2	36	
9	Montluçon	34	10	13	11	36	35	+1	33	
10	Chaumont	34	10	13	11	36	49	−13	33	
11	Toulouse	34	13	7	14	42	53	−11	33	
12	Toulon	34	12	6	16	42	43	−1	30	
13	Saint-Dié	34	10	10	14	33	41	−8	30	
14	Olympique Alès	34	12	4	18	41	51	−10	28	
15	Gazélec Ajaccio	34	11	6	17	36	53	−17	28	
16	Épinal	34	9	7	18	40	52	−12	25	Relegated
17	AS Troyes	34	7	10	17	33	44	−11	24	Relegated
18	Arles	34	5	6	23	34	72	−38	16	Relegated

Source: rsssf.com

=== Group B ===
Pos	Team	Pld	W	D	L	GF	GA	GD	Pts	Promotion or relegation
1	Stade Brest	34	25	4	5	69	22	+47	54	Promoted
2	Lens	34	21	9	4	74	26	+48	51	Promoted
3	Dunkerque	34	17	12	5	51	29	+22	46	
4	Tours	34	15	13	6	53	39	+14	43	
5	Rouen	34	13	11	10	52	44	+8	37	
6	Limoges	34	14	9	11	37	32	+5	37	
7	En Avant Guingamp	34	12	12	10	35	39	−4	36	
8	Stade Rennais	34	13	10	11	43	33	+10	36	
9	Orléans	34	13	8	13	35	42	−7	34	
10	Berrichonne Chateauroux	34	11	11	12	32	36	−4	33	
11	Amicale de Lucé	34	13	6	15	41	45	−4	32	
12	Angoulême	34	9	13	12	33	36	−3	31	
13	Mulhouse	34	11	7	16	33	43	−10	29	
14	Stade Quimpérois	34	11	7	16	46	56	−10	29	
15	Blois	34	9	10	15	39	57	−18	28	
16	US Boulogne	34	7	7	20	33	53	−20	21	Relegated
17	Melun	34	6	6	22	28	63	−35	18	Relegated
18	Amiens	34	3	11	20	28	66	−38	17	Relegated

Source: rsssf.com

== Championship play-offs ==
Team 1	Agg.	Team 2	1st leg	2nd leg
Gueugnon	3–1	Brest	1–0	2–1

== Promotion play-offs ==
Team 1	Agg.	Team 2	1st leg	2nd leg
Avignon	3–4	Lens	2–0	1–4

Lens was qualified to the play-off against 19th placed team of Division 1, Paris FC.
