= Union Nationale des Footballeurs Professionnels =

Trade union for footballers in France

The Union Nationale des Footballeurs Professionnels (UNFP; English: National Union of Professional Footballers) is the main trade union for professional football players in France. It was founded on 16 November 1961 by Eugène N'Jo Léa and Just Fontaine, two footballers, and Jacques Bertrand, a jurist. As of May 2021, the presidents of the UNFP are Philippe Piat and Sylvain Kastendeuch.

Each month, a trophy is awarded by the UNFP to the best players in Ligue 1 and Ligue 2. At the end of each season, the Trophées UNFP awards the best Ligue 1, Ligue 2, and Division 1 Féminine players, managers and referees of the season. Since 1990, during the summer, the UNFP organizes training sessions for players whose contracts have ended but have not found new teams.

== Presidents ==
- 1961–1964: Just Fontaine
- 1964–1969: Michel Hidalgo
- 1969–2006: Philippe Piat
- 2006–present: Philippe Piat & Sylvain Kastendeuch

== See also ==
- Trophées UNFP du football
- UNFP Player of the Month
