= Václav Bouška =

Czech footballer

Personal information
- Date of birth: August 21, 1910
- Place of birth: Austria-Hungary
- Date of death: September 20, 1975 (aged 65)
- Place of death: Czechoslovakia
- Position: Midfielder

Senior career*
Years	Team	Apps	(Gls)
1931–1934	SK Kladno		
1934–1935	Olympique Lillois		
1935–1937	SK Prostějov		
1937–1942	SK Slavia Prague		

International career
1933–1937	Czechoslovakia	7	(0)
1933	Czechoslovakia B	1	(0)
- * Club domestic league appearances and goals

Václav Bouška (21 August 1910 – 20 September 1975) was a Czechoslovak football midfielder. He played 7 games for the Czechoslovakia national football team. Bouška played 182 matches in the Czechoslovak First League in the 1930s and early 1940s, scoring 3 goals. He was part of the Slavia Prague team which won three consecutive titles in the Národní liga between 1939 and 1942.
