= Bob Senoussi =

Chadian footballer (born 1966)

Personal information
- Full name: Al Habo Senoussi
- Date of birth: 15 October 1966 (age 60)
- Place of birth: Ndjamena, Chad
- Height: 1.84 m (6 ft 0 in)
- Position: Defender

Senior career*
Years	Team	Apps	(Gls)
1984–1988	Nice	2	(0)
1988–1989	Le Touquet		
1989	Quimper	14	(0)
1990–1992	Rennes	54	(3)
1992–1993	Le Touquet		
1993–1994	Pau FC		
1994–1995	Grenoble		
1995–1997	Le Mans	57	(1)
1997–1999	Lille	50	(3)
1999–2000	ASOA Valence	11	(0)
- * Club domestic league appearances and goals

Al Habo Senoussi (born 15 October 1966), commonly known as Bob Senoussi, is a Chadian former professional footballer who played as a defender.
