= Damelevières =

- Commune
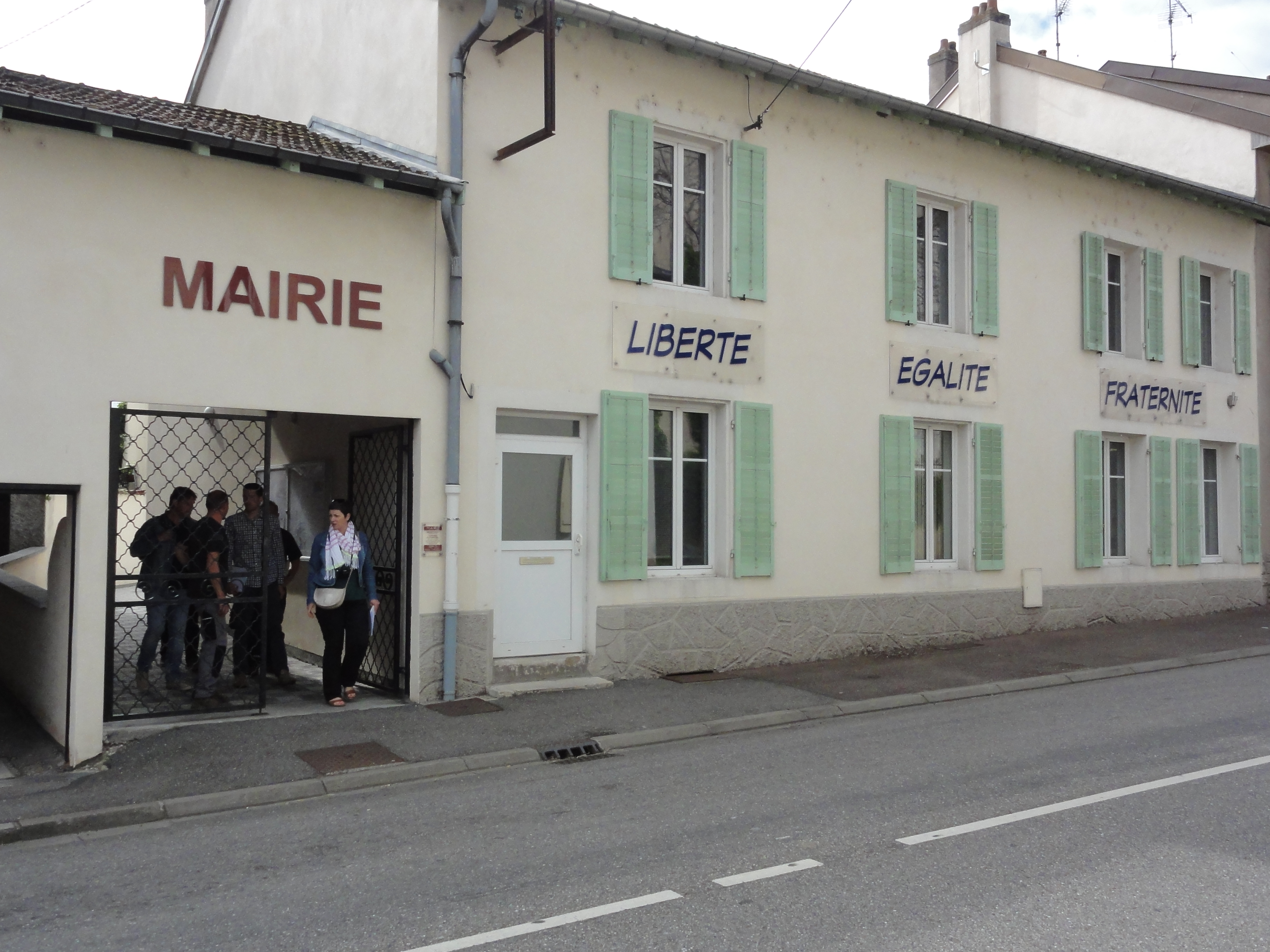
- The town hall in Damelevières

- Coat of arms
- Location of Damelevières
- Location within France Location within Grand Est
- Coordinates: 48°33′27″N 6°23′19″E
- Country: France
- Region: Grand Est
- Department: Meurthe-et-Moselle
- Arrondissement: Lunéville
- Canton: Lunéville-2
- Intercommunality: CC Meurthe, Mortagne, Moselle

Government
  - Mayor (2020–2026): Christophe Sonrel
- Area^{1}: 8.12 km^{2} (3.14 sq mi)
- Highest elevation: 264 m (866 ft)
- Lowest elevation: 207 m (679 ft)
- Population (2023): 3,080
  - Density: 379/km^{2} (982/sq mi)
- Demonym(s): Damelibairiens, Damelibairiennes
- Time zone: UTC+01:00 (CET)
  - Summer (DST): UTC+02:00 (CEST)
- INSEE/Postal code: 54152 /54360
- Website: damelevieres.fr
- ^{1} French Land Register data, which excludes lakes, ponds, glaciers > 1 km^{2} (0.386 sq mi or 247 acres) and river estuaries.

Damelevières (French pronunciation: [damləvjɛʁ]) is a commune in the Meurthe-et-Moselle department in north-eastern France.

== Population ==
Historical population
| Year | Pop. | ±% p.a. |
|---|---|---|
| 1968 | 3,194 | — |
| 1975 | 3,021 | −0.79% |
| 1982 | 3,039 | +0.08% |
| 1990 | 2,879 | −0.67% |
| 1999 | 2,810 | −0.27% |
| 2007 | 3,012 | +0.87% |
| 2012 | 3,156 | +0.94% |
| 2017 | 3,217 | +0.38% |
| 2023 | 3,080 | −0.72% |
Source: INSEE

== See also ==
- Communes of the Meurthe-et-Moselle department
