= Patrice Ségura =

French football player and manager (born 1961)

Personal information
- Date of birth: 24 May 1961 (age 65)
- Place of birth: Limoges, France
- Height: 1.75 m (5 ft 9 in)
- Position: Forward

Youth career
- 1979–1981: Toulouse

Senior career*
Years	Team	Apps	(Gls)
1981–1983	Toulouse	9	(1)
1983–1984	Sète	33	(17)
1984–1985	Paris Saint-Germain	2	(0)
1985–1986	→ Laval (loan)	5	(0)
1986–1987	Amiens	15	(1)
1987–1988	Lorient	11	(1)
1992	Saint-Pierroise		
Total		75+	(20+)

Managerial career
- Jeanne d'Arc
- La Tamponnaise (assistant)
- Saint-Pierroise
- * Club domestic league appearances and goals

Patrice Ségura (born 24 May 1961) is a French former professional football player and manager.

== Playing career ==
Ségura was a product from Toulouse's academy. He made his first appearances for Les Violets during the 1981–82 season, in which the club won the Division 2 title. In 1983, he joined Sète. He scored a total of 17 goals in his single season at the club.

Ségura signed for Paris Saint-Germain in 1984, and made his first appearance in a 4–1 loss to Monaco on 14 May 1985. He scored his first and only goal for PSG in a 2–0 win against his former club Toulouse in the Coupe de France semi-finals on 4 June. Ségura's final match for Les Parisiens would eventually be the 1–0 loss in to Monaco in the cup final four days later.

During the 1985-86 season, he was loaned to Laval. He continued his career at Amiens, Lorient, and Saint-Pierroise before hanging up his boots.

== Managerial career ==
After retiring from football, Ségura went on to manage three clubs in Réunion: Jeanne d'Arc, La Tamponnaise, and his former side Saint-Pierroise.

== Career statistics ==
Appearances and goals by club, season and competition
Club	Season	League			Cup		Total	
Club	Season	Division	Apps	Goals	Apps	Goals	Apps	Goals
Toulouse	1981–82	Division 2	8	1	0	0	8	1
Toulouse	1982–83	Division 1	1	0	1	0	2	0
Toulouse	Total		9	1	1	0	10	1
Sète	1983–84	Division 2	33	17	1	0	34	17
Paris Saint-Germain	1984–85	Division 1	2	0	2	1	4	1
Laval	1985–86	Division 1	5	0	1	0	6	0
Amiens	1986–87	Division 2	15	1	0	0	15	1
Lorient	1987–88	Division 2	11	1	0	0	11	1
Career total			75	20	5	1	80	21

== Honours ==
Toulouse

- Division 2: 1981–82

Paris Saint-Germain

- Coupe de France runner-up: 1984–85
