= Richard Niederbacher =

Austrian footballer

Personal information
- Date of birth: 7 December 1961 (age 64)
- Place of birth: Gleisdorf, Austria
- Position: Striker

Senior career*
Years	Team	Apps	(Gls)
1979–1983	Sturm Graz	70	(23)
1983–1984	SV Waregem	33	(24)
1984–1985	Paris Saint-Germain	18	(5)
1985	Stade Reims	15	(5)
1986	First Vienna	2	(0)
1986	Rapid Wien	14	(8)
1987–1992	SV Waregem	152	(61)
1992–1993	Vorwärts Steyr	27	(10)
1993–1994	Stahl Linz		
1994–1995	Pécsi Mecsek	22	(10)
1995–1997	DSV Leoben		

International career
1984–1988	Austria	4	(0)

Managerial career
- 2009–2010: DSV Leoben
- * Club domestic league appearances and goals

Richard Niederbacher (born 7 December 1961) is an Austrian former professional football player and coach.

== Club career ==
Niederbacher played for Sturm Graz, SV Waregem, Paris Saint-Germain, Stade Reims, First Vienna, Rapid Wien, Vorwärts Steyr, LASK Linz, Pécsi Mecsek and DSV Leoben. In September 2009 he took over the Head Coaching Position from Dejan Stankovic at the Austrian Regional League Club (Regionalliga Mitte, 3rd Austrian League) DSV Leoben. After financial troubles at the club he left in Summer 2010 to take on a Job as a Coaching Assistant in his hometown Gleisdorf.

== International career ==
He also played 4 times for the Austrian national side.
