= Philippe Tibeuf =

French footballer (born 1962)

Personal information
- Date of birth: 12 June 1962 (age 64)
- Place of birth: Dinan, France
- Position: Striker

Youth career
- 1977–1978: Plancoët

Senior career*
Years	Team	Apps	(Gls)
1978–1984	Guingamp	45	(20)
1984–1987	Monaco	67	(15)
1987–1991	Saint-Étienne	125	(39)

International career
1990	France	2	(0)
- * Club domestic league appearances and goals

Philippe Tibeuf (born 12 June 1962) is a French former footballer who played as a striker.

== Honours ==
Monaco

- Coupe de France: 1984–85
