= Pascal Havet =

French footballer (born 1964)

Personal information
- Date of birth: 21 June 1964 (age 62)
- Place of birth: Louviers, France
- Position: Defender

Senior career*
Years	Team	Apps	(Gls)
1984–1985	Paris Saint-Germain		
1985–1986	Red Star		
1986–1988	Lyon		
1988–1995	Rouen		
1995–1998	Angoulême		
- * Club domestic league appearances and goals

Pascal Havet (born 21 June 1964 died 29 April 2025) was a French former professional footballer who played as a defender.
