= Philippe Périlleux =

French footballer (born 1963)

Personal information
- Date of birth: 16 September 1963 (age 63)
- Place of birth: Origny-Sainte-Benoite
- Position: Midfielder

Senior career*
Years	Team	Apps	(Gls)
1982–1984	Valenciennes		
1984–1991	Lille	226	(21)
1991–1995	Montpellier	111	(7)
1995–1996	Lille	18	(0)
1996–1997	Dunkerque		
- * Club domestic league appearances and goals

Philippe Périlleux (born 16 September 1963) is a French retired footballer who played as a midfielder. He played 12 straight seasons in the Ligue 1.

== Honours ==
Montpellier

- Coupe de la Ligue: 1991–92
