= Franck Mérelle =

French footballer (born 1960)

Personal information
- Full name: Franck Mérelle
- Date of birth: 25 May 1960 (age 66)
- Place of birth: Meaux, France
- Height: 1.81 m (5 ft 11 in)
- Position: Goalkeeper

Senior career*
Years	Team	Apps	(Gls)
1981–1985	Paris Saint-Germain	1	(0)
1983–1984	→ Cannes (loan)	14	(0)
1985–1986	Auxerre	4	(0)
1986–1990	Chamois Niortais	135	(0)
1990–1993	Red Star	38	(0)
Total		192	(0)
- * Club domestic league appearances and goals

Franck Mérelle (born 25 May 1960) is a French former professional footballer who played as a goalkeeper.
