= 1984–85 Coupe de France =

Tournament details
- Country: France

Final positions
- Champions: Monaco (4th title)
- Runners-up: Paris Saint-Germain

The 1984–85 Coupe de France was the 68th Coupe de France, France's annual national football cup competition. It was won by AS Monaco who defeated Paris Saint-Germain in the final.

== Round of 16 ==
Team 1	Agg.	Team 2	1st leg	2nd leg
AS Nancy (D1)	2–5	Paris SG (D1)	2–1	0–4
FC Sochaux-Montbéliard (D1)	7–1	SC Bastia (D1)	2–0	5–1
Lille OSC (D1)	2–1	FC Rouen (D1)	2–1	0–0
FC Nantes (D1)	3–1	Nîmes Olympique (D2)	1–1	2–1
RC Lens (D1)	2–3	AS Saint-Étienne (D2)	1–1	1–2
AS Monaco (D1)	4–0	CS Sedan Ardennes (D2)	3–0	1–0
Toulouse FC (D1)	10–0	FC Valence (D2)	7–0	3–0
RC Paris (D1)	4–2	FC Mulhouse (D2)	2–1	2–1

== Quarter-finals ==
Team 1	Agg.	Team 2	1st leg	2nd leg
AS Monaco (D1)	6–0	RC Paris (D1)	3–0	3–0
Toulouse FC (D1)	5–3	FC Sochaux-Montbéliard (D1)	2–0	3–3
AS Saint-Étienne (D2)	1–2	Lille OSC (D1)	1–0	0–2
Paris SG (D1)	2–0	FC Nantes (D1)	1–0	1–0

== Semi-finals ==
=== First leg ===
1 June 1985

Monaco (1)	2–0	Lille (1)
Bravo 21'; Bellone 27'

Stade Louis II, Monaco
Attendance: 6,536
Referee: Jean-Marie Lartigot

31 May 1985

Toulouse (1)	2–0	Paris Saint-Germain (1)
Stopyra 25'; Lacombe 80'

Stadium Municipal, Toulouse
Attendance: 27,184
Referee: Michel Vautrot

=== Second leg ===
4 June 1985

Lille (1)	1–0	Monaco (1)
Perilleux 2'

Stade Grimonprez Jooris, Lille
Attendance: 22,000
Referee: Robert Wurtz

Monaco won 2–1 on aggregate.

4 June 1985

Paris Saint-Germain (1)	2–0 (a.e.t.)	Toulouse (1)
Ségura 36'; Lanthier 60'
Penalties
Rocheteau (penalty scored); Sušić (penalty scored); Jeannol (penalty scored); Bathenay (penalty scored); Fernandez (penalty scored)	5–3	(penalty scored) Domergue; (penalty scored) Stopyra; (penalty missed) Laverny; (penalty scored) Marx

Parc des Princes, Paris
Attendance: 28,000
Referee: Michel Girard

2–2 on aggregate. Paris Saint-Germain won 5–3 on penalties.

== Final ==
8 June 1985

Monaco	1–0	Paris Saint-Germain
Genghini 14'

Parc des Princes, Paris
Attendance: 45,711
Referee: Gérard Biguet
