= Fabrice Moreau (footballer) =

French-Cameroonian footballer (born 1967)

Personal information
- Full name: Fabrice Moreau
- Date of birth: 7 October 1967 (age 59)
- Place of birth: Paris, France
- Height: 1.79 m (5 ft 10 in)
- Position: Midfielder

Youth career
- 1983–1984: ES Parisienne

Senior career*
Years	Team	Apps	(Gls)
1984–1989	Paris Saint-Germain	2	(0)
1987–1988	→ La Roche Vendée (loan)	27	(1)
1989–1991	Le Mans	27	(1)
1991–1992	CS Meaux	0	(0)
1992–1993	RC Paris	29	(4)
1993–1995	Paris FC	54	(12)
1995–1996	Marseille	15	(2)
1996	Toulon	10	(0)
1996–1998	Rayo Vallecano	63	(5)
1998–1999	Talavera	5	(0)
1999	Beijing Guoan	18	(1)
1999–2000	Numancia	10	(0)
2000–2001	Airdrieonians	24	(6)
2001	Notts County	5	(0)
2001–2002	Red Star	10	(0)
2002–2003	Grazer AK	0	(0)
2003	Real Avila	9	(0)
Total		308	(32)

International career
1996–2004	Cameroon	7	(1)
- * Club domestic league appearances and goals

Fabrice Moreau (born 7 October 1967) is a French-Cameroonian former professional footballer who played as a midfielder for 17 different clubs before retiring at 36, in 2004. Born to a French father and a Cameroonian mother, he was a full international for the Cameroon national team, although not in any major tournament's final stages.

== Honours ==
Airdrieonians

- Scottish Challenge Cup: 2000–01
