= William N'Jo Léa =

French footballer (born 1962)

Personal information
- Full name: Éric William N'Jo Léa
- Date of birth: 15 July 1962 (age 64)
- Place of birth: Paris, France
- Position: Forward

Senior career*
Years	Team	Apps	(Gls)
1983–1984	Brest	28	(5)
1984–1985	Paris Saint-Germain	16	(4)
1985–1988	Lens	64	(17)
1988–1989	Caen	11	(0)
Total		119	(26)
- * Club domestic league appearances and goals

Éric William N'Jo Léa (born 15 July 1962) is a French former professional footballer who played as a forward for Stade Brestois 29, Paris Saint-Germain, RC Lens and Stade Malherbe Caen.

== Personal life ==
His father was the Cameroonian former footballer Eugène N'Jo Léa.
