= Eugène N'Jo Léa =

Cameroonian footballer (1931–2006)

Personal information
- Date of birth: 15 July 1931
- Place of birth: Batuchi, Cameroon
- Date of death: 23 October 2006 (aged 75)
- Place of death: Douala, Cameroon
- Height: 1.70 m (5 ft 7 in)
- Position: Striker

Senior career*
Years	Team	Apps	(Gls)
1954–1959	Saint-Étienne	101	(70)
1959–1961	Lyon	50	(21)
1961–1962	Racing Paris	2	(0)
Total		153	(91)
- * Club domestic league appearances and goals

Eugène N'Jo Léa (15 July 1931 – 23 October 2006) was a Cameroonian professional footballer who played in France with Saint-Étienne, Lyon and Racing Paris.

== Personal life ==
His son is fellow player William N'Jo Léa.

With Just Fontaine he founded the National Union of Professional Football Players in 1961.
