= Gérard Buscher =

French footballer and manager (born 1960)

Personal information
- Full name: Gérard Buscher
- Date of birth: 5 November 1960 (age 65)
- Place of birth: Algiers, French Algeria
- Position: Striker

Team information
- Current team: Rwanda (technical director)

Senior career*
Years	Team	Apps	(Gls)
1977–1983	Nice	139	(35)
1983–1984	Nantes	16	(3)
1984–1987	Brest	106	(47)
1987–1988	Matra Racing	43	(6)
1988–1989	Montpellier	17	(5)
1989–1990	Brest	28	(10)
1990–1992	Valenciennes	36	(4)
1992–1994	Nice	15	(1)

International career
1986–1987	France	2	(0)

Managerial career
- 2005: Nice
- 2009–2010: CS Hammam-Lif
- 2010: CA Bizertin
- 2010–2013: AS Marsa
- 2013: Ittihad Kalba
- 2014–2015: CS Hammam-Lif
- 2016: AS Marsa
- 2017: Stade Gabèsien
- 2018–2019: CS Hammam-Lif
- 2021: Mauritania (interim)
- 2022-2023: Rwanda (technical director)
- 2023: Rwanda (interim)
- 2023-: Rwanda (technical director)
- * Club domestic league appearances and goals

Gérard Buscher (born 5 November 1960) is a French association football manager and former professional player.

Buscher has a son, Mickaël Buscher who last played for Tunisian CA Bizertin.
