= Manuel Abreu =

Portuguese footballer and coach (1959–2022)

Personal information
- Full name: Manuel Ferreira Abreu Freitas
- Date of birth: 8 January 1959
- Place of birth: Fafe, Fafe, Portugal
- Date of death: 10 May 2022 (aged 63)
- Place of death: Portugal
- Position: Defender

Youth career
- Saint-Gratien

Senior career*
Years	Team	Apps	(Gls)
1977–1978	Red Star	8	(1)
1978–1979	Poissy		
1979–1983	Reims	128	(12)
1983–1984	Paris Saint-Germain	10	(0)
1984–1986	Nancy	51	(3)
1986–1987	Braga		
1987–1990	Quimper	80	(2)
1990–1991	Charleville		
1991–1993	US Lusitanos Saint-Maur		
1993–1995	Reims		

Managerial career
- 1995–2000: Reims
- 2001–2002: Calais
- 2003–2007: Sedan (U18 & Reserves)
- 2008–2010: Sénart-Moissy
- 2010–2011: Saint-Priest
- 2011–2013: FC Chartres
- 2014–2015: Racing Colombes 92
- 2016–2017: Saint-Quentin
- 2017–2018: Rouen
- 2018–2020: Reims Sainte-Anne
- 2020–2021: Cormontreuil FC
- * Club domestic league appearances and goals

Manuel Ferreira Abreu Freitas (8 January 1959 – 10 May 2022) was a Portuguese football coach and player. He played as a defender for Red Star, Poissy, Reims, Paris Saint-Germain, Nancy, Sporting Braga, Quimper, Charleville and US Lusitanos Saint-Maur.

He coached several French teams, including Sénart-Moissy, Reims and Calais.

He holds both French and Portuguese nationalities.
