= Boris Diecket =

Ivorian footballer

Personal information
- Date of birth: 31 January 1963 (age 63)
- Place of birth: Abidjan, Ivory Coast
- Position: Midfielder

International career
Years	Team	Apps	(Gls)
1988	Ivory Coast	1	(0)

Boris Diecket (born 31 January 1963) is an Ivorian footballer. He played in one match for the Ivory Coast national football team in 1988. He was also named in the Ivory Coast's squad for the 1986 African Cup of Nations tournament.
