= Philippe Jeannol =

French footballer (born 1958)

Personal information
- Date of birth: 6 August 1958 (age 68)
- Place of birth: Nancy, France
- Position: Defender

Senior career*
Years	Team	Apps	(Gls)
1975–1984	Nancy	230	(38)
1984–1991	Paris Saint-Germain	219	(16)

International career
1986	France	1	(0)
Medal record
Men's football
Representing France
Gold medal – first place	1984 Los Angeles	Team competition
- * Club domestic league appearances and goals

Philippe Jeannol (born 6 August 1958) is a French former professional footballer who played as a defender.

Jeannol was a member of the French squad that won the gold medal at the 1984 Summer Olympics in Los Angeles, California.
