= 1984–85 French Division 1 =

47th season of French Division 1

Division 1
- Season: 1984–85
- Champions: Bordeaux (3rd title)
- Relegated: Rouen; Tours; Racing Paris
- European Cup: Bordeaux
- Cup Winners' Cup: Monaco
- UEFA Cup: Nantes; Auxerre; Metz
- Matches: 380
- Goals: 978 (2.57 per match)
- Top goalscorer: Vahid Halilhodžić (28)

Girondins de Bordeaux won Division 1 season 1984/1985 of the French Association Football League with 59 points.

== Participating teams ==
- Auxerre
- SEC Bastia
- Bordeaux
- Stade Brest
- Stade Lavallois
- RC Lens
- Lille
- Olympique Marseille
- FC Metz
- AS Monaco
- AS Nancy
- FC Nantes Atlantique
- RC Paris
- Paris Saint-Germain FC
- FC Rouen
- FC Sochaux
- RC Strasbourg
- Sporting Toulon Var
- Toulouse FC
- Tours FC
Location of teams in 1984–85 Division 1

== League table ==
| Pos | Team | Pld | W | D | L | GF | GA | GD | Pts | Qualification or relegation |
|---|---|---|---|---|---|---|---|---|---|---|
| 1 | Bordeaux (C) | 38 | 25 | 9 | 4 | 70 | 27 | +43 | 59 | Qualification to European Cup first round |
| 2 | Nantes | 38 | 24 | 8 | 6 | 62 | 32 | +30 | 56 | Qualification to UEFA Cup first round |
| 3 | Monaco | 38 | 18 | 12 | 8 | 65 | 28 | +37 | 48 | Qualification to Cup Winners' Cup first round (Note: Monaco qualified for 1985–86 European Cup Winners' Cup as winners of the 1984–85 Coupe de France.) |
| 4 | Auxerre | 38 | 18 | 11 | 9 | 53 | 39 | +14 | 47 | Qualification to UEFA Cup first round |
| 5 | Metz | 38 | 18 | 9 | 11 | 50 | 46 | +4 | 45 | Qualification to UEFA Cup first round |
| 6 | Toulon | 38 | 19 | 6 | 13 | 46 | 37 | +9 | 44 | |
| 7 | Lens | 38 | 16 | 8 | 14 | 57 | 43 | +14 | 40 | |
| 8 | Sochaux | 38 | 12 | 14 | 12 | 55 | 43 | +12 | 38 | |
| 9 | Brest | 38 | 11 | 14 | 13 | 50 | 51 | −1 | 36 | |
| 10 | Laval | 38 | 12 | 12 | 14 | 39 | 52 | −13 | 36 | |
| 11 | Toulouse | 38 | 11 | 13 | 14 | 43 | 49 | −6 | 35 | |
| 12 | Nancy | 38 | 12 | 10 | 16 | 52 | 54 | −2 | 34 | |
| 13 | Paris Saint-Germain | 38 | 13 | 7 | 18 | 58 | 73 | −15 | 33 | |
| 14 | Bastia | 38 | 11 | 10 | 17 | 39 | 68 | −29 | 32 | |
| 15 | Lille | 38 | 9 | 13 | 16 | 37 | 45 | −8 | 31 | |
| 16 | Strasbourg | 38 | 9 | 13 | 16 | 47 | 57 | −10 | 31 | |
| 17 | Marseille | 38 | 13 | 5 | 20 | 51 | 67 | −16 | 31 | |
| 18 | Rouen (R) | 38 | 8 | 13 | 17 | 28 | 46 | −18 | 29 | Qualification to relegation play-offs |
| 19 | Tours (R) | 38 | 9 | 11 | 18 | 44 | 66 | −22 | 29 | Relegation to French Division 2 |
| 20 | Racing Paris (R) | 38 | 9 | 8 | 21 | 32 | 55 | −23 | 26 | Relegation to French Division 2 |

Source: Histoire du PSG
Rules for classification: 1) points; 2) goal difference; 3) number of goals scored.
Victory: 2 points, Draw: 1 point, Defeat: 0 points
(C) Champions; (R) Relegated
Notes:

Promoted from Division 2, who will play in Division 1 season 1985/1986

- Le Havre AC:Champion of Division 2, winner of Division 2 group A
- OGC Nice:Runner-up, winner of Division 2 group B
- Stade Rennais:Third place, winner of barrages against FC Rouen

== Results ==
| Home \ Away | AUX | BAS | BOR | BRE | LAV | RCL | LIL | OM | MET | ASM | NAL | FCN | PSG | RCP | ROU | SOC | RCS | SCT | TFC | TOU |
|---|---|---|---|---|---|---|---|---|---|---|---|---|---|---|---|---|---|---|---|---|
| Auxerre | | 3–1 | 1–1 | 3–1 | 2–1 | 0–0 | 3–0 | 4–2 | 2–0 | 2–0 | 1–0 | 1–0 | 2–1 | 1–0 | 2–0 | 0–0 | 2–0 | 1–1 | 2–0 | 1–0 |
| Bastia | 2–2 | | 0–0 | 2–0 | 1–0 | 2–1 | 2–1 | 1–0 | 1–3 | 1–0 | 1–1 | 1–1 | 1–2 | 0–0 | 3–0 | 1–1 | 2–1 | 3–2 | 4–0 | 2–2 |
| Bordeaux | 6–1 | 4–0 | | 3–0 | 5–2 | 2–1 | 2–0 | 4–1 | 6–0 | 0–0 | 3–1 | 2–1 | 3–1 | 1–0 | 2–0 | 1–0 | 3–2 | 2–0 | 2–1 | 2–1 |
| Brest | 2–0 | 4–2 | 0–0 | | 3–0 | 3–2 | 0–0 | 3–0 | 0–1 | 0–2 | 2–2 | 4–2 | 3–1 | 3–0 | 0–2 | 1–0 | 1–1 | 0–1 | 2–2 | 3–3 |
| Laval | 2–1 | 2–1 | 0–2 | 0–0 | | 1–3 | 1–1 | 4–2 | 1–4 | 0–0 | 2–2 | 0–1 | 0–0 | 1–0 | 2–0 | 2–1 | 2–1 | 1–0 | 3–3 | 3–1 |
| Lens | 1–0 | 3–0 | 2–1 | 1–1 | 3–0 | | 2–0 | 3–0 | 0–0 | 2–2 | 3–0 | 0–1 | 4–2 | 1–0 | 1–0 | 3–1 | 0–0 | 3–0 | 0–0 | 6–1 |
| Lille | 1–1 | 1–2 | 0–1 | 2–0 | 0–0 | 2–0 | | 1–1 | 1–0 | 1–1 | 4–0 | 1–1 | 3–1 | 2–1 | 0–0 | 1–1 | 3–0 | 1–1 | 0–0 | 3–0 |
| Marseille | 1–1 | 5–0 | 0–1 | 3–2 | 0–0 | 1–2 | 2–0 | | 2–1 | 3–0 | 0–1 | 0–2 | 3–1 | 0–2 | 3–2 | 3–1 | 2–1 | 4–2 | 2–1 | 3–2 |
| Metz | 2–1 | 1–0 | 1–1 | 2–0 | 0–2 | 4–1 | 2–0 | 3–0 | | 1–1 | 2–2 | 1–1 | 2–1 | 2–0 | 1–0 | 1–1 | 1–0 | 1–0 | 2–1 | 1–1 |
| Monaco | 0–0 | 4–0 | 3–0 | 0–0 | 0–0 | 3–0 | 6–1 | 3–0 | 7–0 | | 1–0 | 1–1 | 4–1 | 3–0 | 2–0 | 2–0 | 3–0 | 0–2 | 0–0 | 4–0 |
| Nancy | 1–1 | 2–0 | 0–1 | 0–2 | 2–3 | 2–1 | 1–0 | 3–1 | 2–1 | 1–1 | | 1–2 | 6–1 | 4–0 | 2–2 | 2–2 | 1–1 | 0–2 | 1–1 | 1–0 |
| Nantes | 2–1 | 3–0 | 0–1 | 0–2 | 2–0 | 2–0 | 1–0 | 3–0 | 1–0 | 1–0 | 2–1 | | 2–0 | 1–1 | 2–1 | 1–1 | 2–2 | 3–1 | 2–2 | 4–0 |
| Paris SG | 0–0 | 7–1 | 1–2 | 1–1 | 0–1 | 4–3 | 2–3 | 2–1 | 1–2 | 2–1 | 2–4 | 2–3 | | 2–2 | 3–2 | 1–1 | 2–0 | 0–0 | 3–1 | 2–0 |
| Racing Paris | 1–3 | 0–0 | 0–0 | 3–0 | 2–0 | 2–1 | 2–2 | 0–2 | 0–2 | 0–1 | 1–0 | 1–2 | 0–1 | | 1–0 | 0–2 | 2–2 | 0–1 | 3–1 | 3–1 |
| Rouen | 1–2 | 1–1 | 0–0 | 2–2 | 2–0 | 1–0 | 0–0 | 1–1 | 1–0 | 2–1 | 0–1 | 1–0 | 0–1 | 1–1 | | 1–1 | 1–0 | 1–0 | 0–2 | 0–0 |
| Sochaux | 2–1 | 4–0 | 1–1 | 4–2 | 2–0 | 1–2 | 1–0 | 2–0 | 1–1 | 1–2 | 1–0 | 0–1 | 4–1 | 6–1 | 4–0 | | 3–1 | 0–0 | 0–1 | 2–2 |
| Strasbourg | 1–1 | 1–1 | 2–2 | 1–1 | 2–0 | 1–1 | 2–1 | 2–1 | 4–1 | 3–3 | 2–1 | 1–3 | 1–1 | 3–0 | 1–1 | 4–2 | | 0–1 | 1–0 | 1–0 |
| Toulon | 2–0 | 1–0 | 1–2 | 2–1 | 1–1 | 1–0 | 2–1 | 2–0 | 0–2 | 0–1 | 3–1 | 1–2 | 5–1 | 1–0 | 1–1 | 1–0 | 3–1 | | 2–1 | 2–0 |
| Toulouse | 1–3 | 3–0 | 2–1 | 0–0 | 1–1 | 1–0 | 1–0 | 2–0 | 1–1 | 1–2 | 1–0 | 1–3 | 0–1 | 1–3 | 1–1 | 0–0 | 2–1 | 2–0 | | 3–1 |
| Tours | 3–1 | 2–0 | 1–0 | 1–1 | 1–1 | 1–1 | 2–0 | 2–2 | 2–1 | 2–1 | 1–3 | 0–1 | 2–3 | 2–0 | 2–0 | 2–2 | 1–0 | 0–1 | 2–2 | |

Legend: Blue = home team win; Yellow = draw; Red = away team win.

== Relegation play-offs ==
| Team 1 | Agg. | Team 2 | 1st leg | 2nd leg |
|---|---|---|---|---|
| Rennes | 1–1 (7–6 p) | Rouen | 0–1 | 1–0 (a.e.t.) |

== Top goalscorers ==
| Rank | Player | Club | Goals |
|---|---|---|---|
| 1 | (Socialist Federal Republic of Yugoslavia) Vahid Halilhodžić | Nantes | 28 |
| 2 | (France) Bernard Lacombe | Bordeaux | 22 |
| 3 | (France) Gérard Buscher | Brest | 19 |
| 4 | (Argentina) Delio Onnis | Toulon | 17 |
| 4 | (France) Yannick Stopyra | Toulouse | 17 |
| 6 | (France) Bernard Genghini | Monaco | 15 |
| 6 | (France) Dominique Rocheteau | Paris Saint-Germain | 15 |
| 6 | (France) Stéphane Paille | Sochaux | 15 |
| 9 | (France) Philippe Anziani | Monaco | 14 |
| 9 | (Argentina) Omar Da Fonseca | Tours | 14 |

== Attendances ==
| # | Club | Average |
|---|---|---|
| 1 | Girondins | 19,621 |
| 2 | Marseille | 17,516 |
| 3 | Nantes | 17,443 |
| 4 | PSG | 16,255 |
| 5 | Lens | 13,031 |
| 6 | Metz | 11,502 |
| 7 | Tours | 9,705 |
| 8 | Toulouse | 9,579 |
| 9 | Toulon | 9,420 |
| 10 | Racing | 9,139 |
| 11 | Strasbourg | 9,117 |
| 12 | AJA | 8,174 |
| 13 | LOSC | 8,147 |
| 14 | Stade brestois | 8,119 |
| 15 | Rouen | 8,036 |
| 16 | Stade lavallois | 7,286 |
| 17 | Nancy | 5,774 |
| 18 | Monaco | 4,179 |
| 19 | Sochaux | 4,169 |
| 20 | Bastia | 1,898 |
