= Gérard Lanthier =

French footballer (born 1956)

Personal information
- Date of birth: 3 April 1956 (age 70)
- Place of birth: Lyon, France
- Height: 1.74 m (5 ft 9 in)
- Position: Attacking midfielder

Youth career
- Rhône Sportif Lyon
- 1966–1975: Lyon

Senior career*
Years	Team	Apps	(Gls)
1975–1977	Lyon	16	(0)
1977–1980	Avignon	92	(17)
1980–1984	Auxerre	138	(16)
1984–1985	Paris Saint-Germain	34	(0)
1985–1986	Rennes	34	(1)
1986–1987	Nîmes	20	(3)
1987–1990	Orléans	84	(6)
1990–1991	Paris FC		
1991–1992	Lyon-Duchère		
Total		418+	(43+)

International career
- France Olympic
- France Military

Managerial career
- Avignon
- SC Montfavet
- Arles
- * Club domestic league appearances and goals

Gérard Lanthier (born 3 April 1956) is a French former professional footballer who played as an attacking midfielder.

== International career ==
Lanthier was an Olympic and military international for France.

== Post-playing career ==
After retiring from football, Lanthier worked as the director of a ready-to-wear store in his native Lyon. He would then go on to coach three different football clubs, Avignon, SC Montfavet, and Arles, before becoming an administrative agent for the town of Avignon.

== Honours ==
Paris Saint-Germain

- Coupe de France runner-up: 1984–85
