= Bernard Genghini =

French footballer (born 1958)

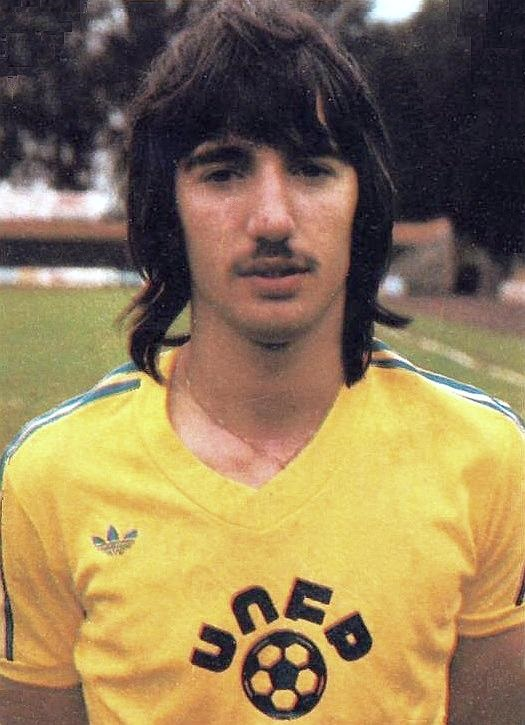
- Genghini in 1979

Personal information
- Full name: Bernard Francis Genghini
- Date of birth: 18 January 1958 (age 68)
- Place of birth: Soultz-Haut-Rhin, Haut-Rhin, France
- Height: 1.78 m (5 ft 10 in)
- Position: Midfielder

Senior career*
Years	Team	Apps	(Gls)
1976–1982	Sochaux	212	(71)
1982–1983	Saint-Étienne	41	(10)
1983–1986	Monaco	129	(57)
1986	Servette	6	(1)
1986–1988	Marseille	50	(6)
1988–1989	Bordeaux	4	(1)
Total		442	(146)

International career
1980–1986	France	27	(6)

Managerial career
- 1992–1995: Mulhouse
Medal record
Representing France
UEFA European Championship
Winner	1984
FIFA World Cup
Third place	1986
- * Club domestic league appearances and goals

Bernard Francis Genghini (born 18 January 1958) is a French former professional footballer who played as a midfielder.

== International career ==
Genghini earned twenty-eight caps and scored six goals for the France national team. He played in three major international tournaments: the 1982 World Cup where he scored free kicks against Kuwait and Austria (fourth place), 1984 European Championships (champions, playing as a substitute in the final), and the 1986 World Cup (third place).

== Honours ==
Monaco

- Ligue 1 runner-up: 1983-84
- Coupe de France: 1984–85
- Trophée des Champions: 1985

France

- UEFA European Championship: 1984

== Personal life ==
Genghini is of Italian descent and is the father of Benjamin Genghini, who is also a footballer.
