= 2026 Houston Dynamo FC season =

Houston Dynamo
2026 season
- Owner: Ted Segal
- General manager: Pat Onstad
- Head coach: Ben Olsen
- Stadium: Shell Energy Stadium
- MLS: Conference: TBD; Overall: TBD
- MLS Cup Playoffs: TBD
- U.S. Open Cup: Quarterfinals
Home colors	Away colors	Third colors

The 2026 Houston Dynamo season is the 21st season of the team's existence since joining Major League Soccer (MLS) prior to the 2006 season. 2026 is the fourth season under head coach Ben Olsen and the fifth season under GM Pat Onstad and technical director Asher Mendelsohn. It was the sixth season (fifth full season) under majority owner Ted Segal.

== Current squad ==
As of November 22, 2026

Appearances and goals are totals for MLS regular season only.

No.	Name	Nationality	Position	Date of birth (Age)	Signed from	Signed in	Apps.	Goals
Goalkeepers
1	Jimmy Maurer	(United States)	GK	October 14, 1988 (age 38)	FC Dallas	2025	3	0
26	Blake Gillingham	(United States)	GK	January 22, 2000 (age 26)	Creighton University	2025	6	0
31	Jonathan Bond	(England)	GK	May 19, 1993 (age 33)	Watford	2025	59	0
35	Logan Erb (HGP)	(United States)	GK	January 7, 2004 (age 22)	NC State University	2026	0	0
Defenders
3	Antônio Carlos	(Brazil)	DF	March 7, 1993 (age 33)	Fluminense	2025	29	1
4	Marcelo Saracchi	(Uruguay)	DF	April 23, 1998 (age 28)	Boca Juniors	2026	5	0
5	Lucas Halter	(Brazil)	DF	May 2, 2000 (age 26)	Botafogo	2026	22	1
21	Franco Negri	(Argentina)	DF	February 20, 1995 (age 31)	San Diego FC	2026	22	1
24	Ibrahim Aliyu (U22)	(Nigeria)	DF	January 16, 2002 (age 24)	Columbus Crew	2026	92	11
27	Reese Miller (HGP)	(United States)	DF	January 17, 2004 (age 22)	University of Virginia	2026	0	0
34	Agustin Resch	(Argentina)	DF	February 28, 2002 (age 24)	Houston Dynamo 2	2026	28	1
36	Felipe Andrade	(Brazil)	DF	June 8, 2000 (age 26)	Fluminense	2025	47	5
Midfielders
6	Artur	(Brazil)	MF	March 11, 1996 (age 30)	Columbus Crew	2023	128	3
14	Duane Holmes	(United States)	MF	November 6, 1994 (age 32)	Preston North End	2025	40	1
16	Héctor Herrera	(Mexico)	MF	April 19, 1990 (age 36)	Toluca	2026	92	8
18	Diadié Samassékou	(Mali)	MF	January 11, 1996 (age 30)	TSG Hoffenheim	2025	28	0
19	Mateusz Bogusz (DP)	(Poland)	MF	August 22, 2001 (age 25)	Cruz Azul	2026	33	8
22	Matthew Arana (HGP)	(Mexico)	MF	August 28, 2010 (age 16)	Houston Dynamo 2	2026	8	0
30	Agustín Bouzat	(Argentina)	MF	January 11, 1996 (age 30)	Vélez Sarsfield	2026	29	2
37	Gilberto Rivera	(United States)	MF	November 28, 2004 (age 21)	Houston Dynamo 2	2026	0	0
Forwards
9	Lyle Foster	(South Africa)	FW	September 3, 2000 (age 26)	Burnley	2026	8	1
11	Lawrence Ennali (U22)	(Germany)	FW	March 7, 2002 (age 24)	Górnik Zabrze	2024	54	5
17	Nick Markanich	(United States)	FW	December 26, 1999 (age 26)	CD Castellón	2026	12	0
20	Guilherme (DP)	(Brazil)	FW	April 13, 1995 (age 31)	Santos	2026	31	16
23	Duncan McGuire	(United States)	FW	February 5, 2001 (age 25)	Orlando City	2026	20	1

== Player movement ==
=== In ===
Per Major League Soccer and club policies terms of the deals do not get disclosed.

Date	Player	Position	Age	Previous club	Notes	Ref
December 18, 2025	(United States) Logan Erb	GK	21	(United States) NC State	Signed as a Homegrown Player.	
December 18, 2025	(United States) Reese Miller	DF	21	(United States) University of Virginia	Signed as a Homegrown Player.	
January 12, 2026	(Brazil) Lucas Halter	DF	25	(Brazil) Botafogo	Signed on a full transfer for an undisclosed fee.	
January 12, 2026	(Argentina) Agustín Bouzat	MF	31	(Argentina) Vélez Sarsfield	Signed on a full transfer for an undisclosed fee.	
January 13, 2026	(Brazil) Guilherme	FW	30	(Brazil) Santos	Signed on a full transfer as a Designated Player. Official fee is undisclosed, but is reportedly $2.1 million	
January 14, 2026	(Mexico) Héctor Herrera	MF	35	(Mexico) Toluca	Signed on a free transfer.	
January 20, 2026	(United States) Nick Markanich	FW	26	(Spain) CD Castellón	Signed on loan for the 2026 season.	
January 27, 2026	(Argentina) Franco Negri	DF	30	(United States) San Diego FC	Signed on a free transfer.	
January 29, 2026	(Poland) Mateusz Bogusz	MF	24	(Mexico) Cruz Azul	Signed on a full transfer as a Designated Player. Official fee is undisclosed, but is reportedly $6 million plus a potential $4 million in add-ons. Cruz Azul retains a 30% sell-on clause.	
February 21, 2026	(Mexico) Matthew Arana	MF	15	(United States) Houston Dynamo 2	Signed as a Homegrown Player.	
March 12, 2026	(Nigeria) Ibrahim Aliyu	DF	24	(United States) Columbus Crew	Acquired in exchange for $250,000 GAM, plus a conditional $500,000 GAM. Columbus retains a sell-on clause.	
March 20, 2026	(Argentina) Agustin Resch	DF	24	(United States) Houston Dynamo 2	Signed to a first team contract.	
March 20, 2026	(United States) Sam Vines	DF	26	(United States) Colorado Rapids	Signed on a free transfer.	
February 21, 2026	(United States) Duncan McGuire	FW	25	(United States) Orlando City	Acquired in exchange for $1,250,000 GAM, plus a conditional $1,150,000 GAM.	
August 11, 2026	(Uruguay) Marcelo Saracchi	DF	28	(Argentina) Boca Juniors	Signed on a full transfer for an undisclosed fee. Deal was reportedly worth $1.25 million with Boca Juniors retaining 40% of his rights.	
September 3, 2026	(South Africa) Lyle Foster	FW	26	(England) Burnley	Signed on loan for the rest of 2026.	
September 19, 2026	(United States) Gilberto Rivera	MF	21	(United States) Houston Dynamo 2	Signed to a first team contract.	

=== Out ===
Date	Player	Position	Age	Destination Club	Notes	Ref
October 21, 2025	(Ghana) Stephen Annor Gyamfi	FW	22	(United States) Forward Madison	Contract option declined.	
October 21, 2025	(United States) Femi Awodesu	DF	24	(Sweden) Helsingborgs IF	Contract option declined.	
October 21, 2025	(United States) Ethan Bartlow	DF	25	(United States) Sporting Kansas City	Contract option declined.	
October 21, 2025	(Morocco) Amine Bassi	MF	27	(Greece) Panetolikos	Contract option declined.	
October 21, 2025	(United States) Erik Dueñas	MF	21	(Mexico) Querétaro	Contract option declined.	
October 21, 2025	(United States) Michael Halliday	DF	22	Retired	Contract option declined.	
October 21, 2025	(Poland) Sebastian Kowalczyk	MF	27	(Poland) Zagłębie Lubin	Contract option declined.	
October 21, 2025	(Jamaica) Damion Lowe	DF	32	(Indonesia) Dewa United Banten	Contract option declined.	
October 21, 2025	(Brazil) Sérgio Santos	FW	31	(United States) Atlanta United	Contract option declined.	
October 21, 2025	(United States) Kieran Sargeant	DF	22	(United States) San Diego FC	Contract option declined.	
October 21, 2025	(United States) Daniel Steres	DF	34		Contract option declined.	
October 21, 2025	(Brazil) Júnior Urso	MF	36	(Brazil) São Bernardo	Contract option declined.	
October 21, 2025	(Argentina) Franco Escobar	DF	30	(Uruguay) Peñarol	Contract expired.	
October 21, 2025	(United States) Gabriel Segal	FW	23	(United States) D.C. United	Contract expired.	
October 21, 2025	(United States) Andrew Tarbell	GK	32	Retired	Contract expired.	
December 23, 2025	(United States) Brooklyn Raines	MF	20	(United States) New England Revolution	Sold for $1.6 million guaranteed, with a conditional $400k and Houston retaining a conditional sell-on fee.	
February 18, 2026	(United States) Griffin Dorsey	DF	26	(United States) Orlando City	Traded for $1 million GAM, split between $600k in 2026 and $400k in 2027. Houston can also receive $200k GAM in incentives and retains a sell-on fee.	
March 18, 2026	(Colombia) Nelson Quiñónes	FW	23		Waived.	
July 29, 2026	(Honduras) Exon Arzú	FW	22	(Venezuela) Carabobo	Sold for an undisclosed fee	
August 14, 2026	(Argentina) Ezequiel Ponce	FW	29	(Spain) Elche	Sold for an undisclosed fee.	
August 28, 2026	(Czech Republic) Ondřej Lingr	MF	27	(Poland) Korona Kielce	Sold for an undisclosed fee, reportedly around $600,000 and can reach around $1.1 million in bonuses.	
September 1, 2026	(Denmark) Erik Sviatchenko	DF	34	(Thailand) Port	Mutually agreed contract termination.	
September 1, 2026	(United States) Jack McGlynn	MF	23	(England) Stoke City	Sold for up to $5.5 million including bonuses, with Houston retaining a sell-on fee.	

=== Loans out ===
Date	Player	Position	Age	Destination Club	Notes	Ref
January 20, 2026	(Honduras) Exon Arzú	FW	21	(Honduras) Real España	Loaned through June 2026.	
January 23, 2026	(England) Toyosi Olusanya	FW	28	(Scotland) Aberdeen	Loaned through June 2026.	
February 13, 2026	(Mexico) Sebastián Rodríguez	MF	18	(Mexico) Monterrey	Loaned through December 2026.	
May 8, 2026	(United States) Logan Erb	GK	22	(United States) Corpus Christi FC	Loaned through December 2026. Recalled from loan on June 5.	
September 2, 2026	(United States) Sam Vines	DF	27	(United States) San Diego FC	Loaned through December 2026 with an option for the 2027 season. Houston receives San Diego's 2028 MLS SuperDraft 3rd round pick.	

=== MLS SuperDraft ===
Round	Pick	Player	Position	Age	College	Notes	Ref
1	11	(United States) Joe Highfield	FW	21	Portland	Did not sign and returned to Portland.	
2	39	(South Africa) Calem Tommy	DF	22	NC State	Signed with Timbers 2.	
3	69	(Argentina) Agustin Resch	DF	22	Seton Hall	Signed with Dynamo 2.	
3	78	(United States) Austin Brummett	FW	21	UConn	Signed with Dynamo 2.	
3	88	(United States) Gilberto Rivera	MF	21	San Jose State	Signed with Dynamo 2.	

== Staff ==
As of February 24, 2026

Executive
Majority owner	(United States) Ted Segal
Minority owners	(United States) Lyle Ayes (United States) James Harden (United States) Tim Howard
General manager/vice president	(Canada) Pat Onstad
Technical director	(United States) Asher Mendelsohn
Assistant general manager	(United States) Nick Kowba
Coaching staff
Head coach	(United States) Ben Olsen
Assistant coach	(United States) Kenny Bundy
Assistant coach	(Venezuela) Juan Guerra
Assistant coach	(Brazil) Marcelo Santos
Assistant coach	(Saint Vincent and the Grenadines) Ezra Hendrickson
Goalkeeper coach	(United States) Preston Burpo
Head of performance	(Republic of Ireland) Paul Caffrey
Performance coach	(United States) Ryan Thamm
Head video analyst	(Canada) Louan Schlicht
Video analyst	(United States) Reece Edwards
Head of sports science	(Japan) Ai Ishida
Strength & conditioning coach	(United States) Anthony Narcisi
Director of sports medicine	(United States) Craig Devine
Head athletic trainer	(United States) Meghan McKay
Assistant athletic trainer	(United States) Brandi Neely
Assistant athletic trainer	(United States) Randi Lininger
Physical therapist	(United States) Micah Kust
Director of identification	(Canada) Mark Watson
Head of recruitment & analyst	(Uruguay) Sebastian Romero
Head equipment manager	(United States) James Salazar

== Competitions ==
=== Major League Soccer ===
==== Standings ====
===== Western Conference =====
MLS Western Conference table (2026)
Pos	Team	Pld	W	L	T	GF	GA	GD	Pts	Qualification
3	St. Louis City SC	34	15	10	9	59	48	+11	54	Qualification for round one
4	San Jose Earthquakes	34	14	10	10	57	51	+6	52	Qualification for round one
5	Houston Dynamo FC	34	14	11	9	43	43	0	51	Qualification for round one
6	Los Angeles FC	34	12	11	11	52	40	+12	47	Qualification for round one
7	Portland Timbers	34	13	14	7	62	61	+1	46	Qualification for round one

Source: MLS
Rules for classification: 1) points; 2) total wins; 3) total goal differential; 4) total goals scored; 5) fewer disciplinary points; 6) away goal differential; 7) away goals scored; 8) home goals differential; 9) home goals scored; 10) coin toss (2 clubs tied) or drawing of lots (≥3 clubs tied)

===== Overall =====
Overall MLS standings table
Pos	Team	Pld	W	L	T	GF	GA	GD	Pts	Qualification
8	St. Louis City SC (U)	34	15	10	9	59	48	+11	54	Qualification for the CONCACAF Champions Cup round one (Note: As winners of U.S. Open Cup)
9	San Jose Earthquakes	34	14	10	10	57	51	+6	52	
10	Houston Dynamo FC	34	14	11	9	43	43	0	51	
11	Philadelphia Union	34	14	12	8	66	52	+14	50	
12	Columbus Crew	34	14	15	5	59	52	+7	47	

Source: MLS
Rules for classification: 1) points; 2) total wins; 3) total goal differential; 4) total goals scored; 5) fewer disciplinary points; 6) away goal differential; 7) away goals scored; 8) home goals differential; 9) home goals scored; 10) coin toss (2 clubs tied) or drawing of lots (≥3 clubs tied)
(U) U.S. Open Cup winners

==== Results summary ====
Overall								Home						Away					
Pld	W	D	L	GF	GA	GD	Pts	W	D	L	GF	GA	GD	W	D	L	GF	GA	GD
34	14	9	11	43	43	0	51	8	5	4	19	15	+4	6	4	7	24	28	−4

==== Results by round ====
Round	1	2	3	4	5	6	7	8	9	10	11	12	13	14	15	16	17	18	19	20	21	22	23	24	25	26	27	28	29	30	31	32	33	34
Stadium	H	H	H	A	H	A	A	H	A	H	A	A	H	A	H	H	A	A	H	A	A	H	A	H	A	H	H	A	A	H	H	A	A	H
Result	W	L	W	L	L	L	W	W	L	W	W	L	W	D	D	W	W	W	W	W	L	D	D	W	L	D	L	D	D	D	D	W	L	L
Position (conf.)	7	13	8	9	10	12	10	9	9	8	8	8	6	7	7	5	4	4	2	1	2	2	2	2	2	2	4	5	5	5	5	4	5	5
Position (league)	9	20	12	17	19	22	18	15	15	12	11	12	10	11	11	9	8	6	4	3	4	4	4	4	5	5	7	10	10	10	9	8	10	10

Source: Match results
A = Away; H = Home; W = Win; D = Draw; L = Loss; P = Postponed

==== Match results ====
February 21 1	Houston Dynamo	2–1	Chicago Fire	Houston, Texas
7:30 PM CST	Holmes (yellow card) 13'; Guilherme 67', 78'; Sviatchenko (yellow card) 85'	Report	Waterman (yellow card) 26'; Cuypers 31'; Mueller (yellow card) 84'	Stadium: Shell Energy Stadium; Attendance: 20,068; Referee: Filip Dujic

February 28 2	Houston Dynamo	0–2	Los Angeles FC	Houston, Texas
7:30 p.m. CST	McGlynn (yellow card) 22'; Carlos (red card) 45+2'; Bouzat (red card) 76'	Report	Bouanga (yellow card) 35'; Delgado (yellow card) 51', (goal) 56'; Porteous (yellow card) 63'; Eustáquio 82'	Stadium: Shell Energy Stadium; Attendance: 20,853; Referee: Jon Freemon

March 14 3	Houston Dynamo	3–2	Portland Timbers	Houston, Texas
7:30 p.m. CDT	Ponce (yellow card) 45+1'; Guilherme 62', (yellow card) 90+13'; Andrade 77'; Markanich (red card) 90+4'; Bogusz 90+15'	Report	K. Miller (yellow card) 24'; Guerra 45+4'; Lassiter (yellow card) 45+5'; Fory (yellow card) 58'; Velde 80'; Mora (yellow card) 85'	Stadium: Shell Energy Stadium; Attendance: 18,026; Referee: Rubiel Vazquez

March 21 4 Texas Derby	FC Dallas	4–3	Houston Dynamo	Frisco, Texas
7:30 p.m. CDT	Farrington 6', 14'; Urhoghide (yellow card) 19'; Holmes 54' (o.g.); Kaick (yellow card) 57'; Musa 86'	Report	Guilherme 29'; Sviatchenko 31', (yellow card) 45' (yellow-red card) 68'; Ennali 33'; Ponce (yellow card) 38'; Holmes (yellow card) 46'	Stadium: Toyota Stadium; Attendance: 11,004; Referee: Rosendo Mendoza

April 4 5	Houston Dynamo	0–1	Seattle Sounders	Houston, Texas
7:30 p.m. CDT	Andrade (yellow card) 38'	Report	Rothrock (yellow card) 54', (goal) 83'; Ragen (yellow card) 72'	Stadium: Shell Energy Stadium; Attendance: 17,253; Referee: Ismail Elfath

April 11 6	Colorado Rapids	6–2	Houston Dynamo	Commerce City, Colorado
8:30 p.m. CDT	Thompson 5', 53'; Atencio 17', (yellow card) 89'; R. Navarro 73', 90+5' (pen.); Andrade 90+1' (o.g.)	Report	Ennali 69'; Resch (yellow card) 77'; Guilherme 90+3'	Stadium: Dick's Sporting Goods Park; Attendance: 15,102; Referee: Sergii Boiko

April 18 7	Orlando City SC	0–1	Houston Dynamo	Orlando, Florida
6:30 p.m. CDT	Atuesta (yellow card) 18'; B. Ojeda (yellow card) 90+6'	Report	Andrade (yellow card) 28'; Herrera 75'; Maurer (yellow card) 78'	Stadium: Inter&Co Stadium; Attendance: 19,243; Referee: Pierre-Luc Lauziere

April 22 8	Houston Dynamo	1–0	San Diego FC	Houston, Texas
7:30 p.m. CDT	Andrade (yellow card) 14'; Aliyu 35'; Negri (yellow card) 90+3'; Lingr (red card) 90+7'	Report	Godoy (yellow card) 38'; Pellegrino (red card) 79'; Pilcher (yellow card) 90+7'	Stadium: Shell Energy Stadium; Attendance: 15,838; Referee: Rubiel Vazquez

April 25 9 Copa Tejas	Austin FC	2–0	Houston Dynamo	Austin, Texas
7:30 p.m. CDT	Nelson 13'; Hines-Ike (yellow card) 28'; Uzuni 45+2'; Rosales (yellow card) 60'; Desler (yellow card) 70'; Torres (yellow card) 72'	Report	Artur (yellow card) 45+1'; Ennali (yellow card) 80'	Stadium: Q2 Stadium; Attendance: 20,738; Referee: Alexis Da Silva

May 2 10	Houston Dynamo	1–0	Colorado Rapids	Houston, Texas
7:30 p.m. CDT	Andrade (yellow card) 31'; Bogusz (yellow card) 56'; Ennali (yellow card) 63', (goal) 72'	Report	Ojediran (yellow card) 43'; Manyoma (yellow card) 47'; Yapi (yellow card) 66'	Stadium: Shell Energy Stadium; Attendance: 18,889; Referee: Allen Chapman

May 10 11	Los Angeles FC	1–4	Houston Dynamo	Los Angeles, California
8:00 p.m. CDT	Ordaz 45'; Martínez (yellow card) 79'; Boyd (yellow card) 86'; Raposo (yellow card) 90+3'; Tafari (yellow card) 90+4'	Report	McGlynn 25', 55', (yellow card) 45+5'; Guilherme (yellow card) 27', (goal) 34'; Bogusz 51'; Andrade (yellow card) 88'	Stadium: BMO Stadium; Attendance: 21,531; Referee: Drew Fischer

May 13 12	Real Salt Lake	3–0	Houston Dynamo	Sandy, Utah
8:30 p.m. CDT	Holmes 49' (o.g.); Gozo 57', 64'	Report	Bouzat (yellow card) 45+4'	Stadium: America First Field; Attendance: 20,429; Referee: Jair Marrufo

May 16 13	Houston Dynamo	1–0	Vancouver Whitecaps	Houston, Texas
7:30 p.m. CDT	Resch (yellow card) 54'; Guilherme 90+6'	Report	Cabrera (yellow card) 11'; Johnson (yellow card) 45+11'; Ocampo (yellow card) 48'; Cubas (yellow card) 62'; Takaoka (red card) 64'	Stadium: Shell Energy Stadium; Attendance: 20,114; Referee: Ismail Elfath

May 23 14	LA Galaxy	1–1	Houston Dynamo	Carson, California
9:30 p.m. CDT	Paintsil 30', (yellow card) 37'	Report	Bogusz (yellow card) 20'; Resch (yellow card) 38'; Guilherme 41'; Andrade (yellow card) 57'	Stadium: Dignity Health Sports Park; Attendance: 23,638; Referee: Lorenzo Hernandez

July 22 15	Houston Dynamo	1–1	D.C. United	Houston, Texas
7:30 p.m. CDT	Herrera 40'; Artur (yellow card) 69'; Sviatchenko (yellow card) 90+7'	Report	Hefti (yellow card) 67'; Baribo (yellow card) 70', (goal) 78'; Dozzell (yellow card) 73'; Stroud (yellow card) 90+5'	Stadium: Shell Energy Stadium; Attendance: 17,137; Referee: Victor Rivas

July 25 16 Copa Tejas	Houston Dynamo	3–0	Austin FC	Houston, Texas
7:30 p.m. CDT	Bogusz 12', 29'; Guilherme 32'; Andrade (yellow card) 42'; Halter (yellow card) 62'	Report	Ilie (yellow card) 18'; Šabović (yellow card) 62'	Stadium: Shell Energy Stadium; Attendance: 19,869; Referee: Filip Dujic

August 1 17	Sporting Kansas City	0–2	Houston Dynamo	Kansas City, Kansas
7:30 p.m. CDT	Johnsen (yellow card) 11' (red card) 45'	Report	Guilherme 55'; Bouzat 71'; Halter (yellow card) 86'	Stadium: Sporting Park; Attendance: 17,268; Referee: Sergii Boiko

August 8 18	New England Revolution	0–2	Houston Dynamo	Foxborough, Massachusetts
3:30 p.m. CDT		Report	Guilherme 45+2'; Ennali (yellow card) 54'; Resch 63'	Stadium: Gillette Stadium; Attendance: 22,038; Referee: Malik Badawi
Note: Match was originally scheduled for March 7 but postponed due to inclement weather.

August 15 19	Houston Dynamo	1–0	LA Galaxy	Houston, Texas
7:30 p.m. CDT	Guilherme 21' (pen.); Herrera (yellow card) 45+1'; Ennali (yellow card) 56'; Aliyu (yellow card) 90+9' (yellow-red card) 90+11'	Report	Garcés (red card) 58'; Lozano (yellow card) 90+4'	Stadium: Shell Energy Stadium; Attendance: 21,063; Referee: Ricardo Fierro

August 19 20	Vancouver Whitecaps	0–1	Houston Dynamo	Vancouver, British Columbia
9:30 p.m. CDT	Cubas (yellow card) 26'	Report	Negri 34'; Resch (yellow card) 38'; Bouzat (yellow card) 41'	Stadium: BC Place; Attendance: 22,849; Referee: Ricardo Montero

August 22 21	St. Louis City SC	2–1	Houston Dynamo	St. Louis, Missouri
7:30 p.m. CDT	Becher 23', (yellow card) 63'; Mățan (yellow card) 27'; Holse (yellow card) 70'; Polvara 85'; Totland (yellow card) 90+8'	Report	Bogusz (yellow card) 58'; Bouzat (yellow card) 58'; Aliyu 75'; Halter (yellow card) 81'	Stadium: Energizer Park; Attendance: 22,423; Referee: Alexis Da Silva

August 29 22	Houston Dynamo	0–0	San Jose Earthquakes	Houston, Texas
7:30 p.m. CDT		Report	Roberts (yellow card) 58'	Stadium: Shell Energy Stadium; Attendance: 20,308; Referee: Pierre-Luc Lauziere

September 5 23	Charlotte FC	0–0	Houston Dynamo	Charlotte, North Carolina
6:30 p.m. CDT	Ream (yellow card) 45+3'; Diani (yellow card) 49'; Westwood (yellow card) 71' (red card) 71'; Saint-Maximin (yellow card) 83'	Report	Felipe Andrade (yellow card) 8'; Resch (yellow card) 66'; Artur (yellow card) 78'; Guilherme (yellow card) 90+3'	Stadium: Bank of America Stadium; Attendance: 25,450; Referee: Guido Gonzales Jr.

September 9 24	Houston Dynamo	2–1	Real Salt Lake	Houston, Texas
7:30 p.m. CDT	Herrera (yellow card) 54'; Guilherme 57'; Bogusz 87'	Report	Luna (yellow card) 30'; Arias (yellow card) 33'; Guske (yellow card) 67'; Lobjanidze 76'; Quinton (yellow card) 90+5'	Stadium: Shell Energy Stadium; Attendance: 14,742; Referee: Ramy Touchan

September 12 25	San Jose Earthquakes	1–0	Houston Dynamo	San Jose, California
9:30 p.m. CDT	Vieira (yellow card) 1'; Leroux (yellow card) 19'; Munie 38'; Kikanović (yellow card) 90'	Report	Resch (yellow card) 75'	Stadium: PayPal Park; Attendance: 15,204; Referee: Rosendo Mendoza

September 19 26	Houston Dynamo	2–2	FC Cincinnati	Houston, Texas
7:30 p.m. CDT	Guilherme 38'; Bogusz 51' (pen.)	Report	Ramírez 73'; Denkey 90+7' (pen.)	Stadium: Shell Energy Stadium; Attendance: 17,941; Referee: Jair Marrufo

September 26 27	Houston Dynamo	0–2	Sporting Kansas City	Houston, Texas
7:30 p.m. CDT	Herrera (red card) 45+3'; Bouzat (yellow card) 54'	Report	Reynolds (yellow card) 1'; Luiz 27', (yellow card) 45+6'; Harris 45'; Calheira (yellow card) 45+4'; Afrifa (yellow card) 68'	Stadium: Shell Energy Stadium; Attendance: 18,565; Referee: Timothy Ford

October 10 28	Minnesota United	2–2	Houston Dynamo	Saint Paul, Minnesota
7:30 p.m. CDT	Yeboah 48'; González (yellow card) 66'; Caldeira 78'; Trapp (yellow card) 82'	Report	Foster 18'; McGuire 90+2'	Stadium: Allianz Field; Attendance: 19,351; Referee: Marcos de Oliveira

October 14 29	San Diego FC	3–3	Houston Dynamo	San Diego, California
9:30 p.m. CDT	Dreyer 20' (pen.), (yellow card) 77'; Bakambu 22'; Sargeant (yellow card) 53'; Godoy (yellow card) 79'; Pirani 86'	Report	Ennali (yellow card) 5'; Bond (yellow card) 19'; Guilherme 24', 37', (yellow card) 44'; Bogusz 33'	Stadium: Snapdragon Stadium; Attendance: 18,650; Referee: Sergii Boiko

October 17 30 Texas Derby	Houston Dynamo	2–2	FC Dallas	Houston, Texas
7:30 p.m. CDT	Resch (yellow card) 27'; Negri (yellow card) 28'; Herrera 49'; Samassékou (yellow card) 60'; Halter (yellow card) 90'; Bogusz 90+4' (pen.), (yellow card) 90+8'	Report	Cappis 12'; Musa (penalty missed) 29', 90+11' (pen.); Ibeagha (yellow card) 59'; Sarver (red card) 90+12'	Stadium: Shell Energy Stadium; Attendance: 20,112; Referee: Victor Rivas

October 24 31	Houston Dynamo	0–0	Minnesota United	Houston, Texas
7:30 p.m. CDT	Carlos (yellow card) 9'; Bouzat (yellow card) 30'; Ennali (yellow card) 34'	Report		Stadium: Shell Energy Stadium; Attendance: 17,377; Referee: Tori Penso

October 28 32	Seattle Sounders	0–1	Houston Dynamo	Seattle, Washington
9:30 p.m. CDT	Kingston (yellow card) 65'	Report	Halter 26'; Resch (yellow card) 88'	Stadium: Lumen Field; Attendance: 29,036; Referee: Lorenzo Hernandez

November 1 33	Portland Timbers	3–1	Houston Dynamo	Portland, Oregon
8:45 p.m. CST	Smith (yellow card) 18'; Da Costa 25'; Velde 65'; Janssen 78'; Chará (yellow card) 90+3'	Report	Samassékou (yellow card) 40'; Resch (yellow card) 61'; Bouzat 71'	Stadium: Providence Park; Attendance: 22,936; Referee: Drew Fischer

November 7 34	Houston Dynamo	0–1	St. Louis City SC	Houston, Texas
6:00 p.m. CST	Halter (yellow card) 82'	Report	MacNaughton 90+7'	Stadium: Shell Energy Stadium; Attendance: 19,886; Referee: Allen Chapman

=== MLS Cup playoffs ===
November 24 Round one match 1	San Jose Earthquakes	v	Houston Dynamo	San Jose, California
9:00 p.m. CST				Stadium: PayPal Park

November 28 Round one match 2	Houston Dynamo	v	San Jose Earthquakes	Houston, Texas
1:30 p.m. CST				Stadium: Shell Energy Stadium

December 2 Round one match 3	San Jose Earthquakes	v	Houston Dynamo	San Jose, California
p.m. CST				Stadium: PayPal Park

=== U.S. Open Cup ===
April 15 Round of 32	Houston Dynamo (Texas)	4–1	(Texas) El Paso Locomotive FC	Houston, Texas
7:00 PM CDT	Lingr 2'; Resch (yellow card) 30'; Negri (yellow card) 45+1'; Bogusz 46'; Markanich 58'; Ponce 80'	Report	Twumasi (red card) 25'; Avila 75'	Stadium: Shell Energy Stadium; Referee: Trevor Wiseman

April 29 Round of 16	Houston Dynamo (Texas)	2–1 (a.e.t.)	(Kentucky) Louisville City FC	Houston, Texas
7:00 PM CDT	Lingr (yellow card) 78'; Sviatchenko 89'; Ponce 101', (yellow card) 112'	Report	Dayes (yellow card) 40'; Serrano 67'; Duke (yellow card) 117'; Serrano (yellow card) 120+2'	Stadium: Shell Energy Stadium; Referee: Marcos de Oliveira

May 19 Quarterfinals	St. Louis City SC (Missouri)	2–2 (a.e.t.) (4–2 p)	(Texas) Houston Dynamo	St. Louis, Missouri
7:00 PM CDT	Hartel 10', 51' (pen.); Edelman (yellow card) 57'; Durkin (yellow card) 90+7'; Joyner (yellow card) 117'	Report	Bogusz 11'; Ennali (yellow card) 29' (yellow-red card) 109'; Artur 42', (yellow card) 110'; Guilherme (yellow card) 59'; Bouzat (yellow card) 90+4'	Stadium: Energizer Park; Referee: Sergii Demianchuk
	Penalties
	Löwen (penalty scored); Hartel (penalty scored); Baumgartl (penalty scored); Durkin (penalty scored)		(penalty missed) Guilherme; (penalty scored) Lingr; (penalty scored) Holmes; (penalty missed) Herrera

=== Leagues Cup ===
The Dynamo did not qualify for the 2026 Leagues Cup as they were not one of the top 9 teams in the Western Conference for the 2025 season.

== Honors and awards ==
=== MLS Team of the Matchday ===
Matchday	Player	Position	Ref.
1	(Brazil) Guilherme	MF	
4	(Brazil) Guilherme	Bench	
4	(Poland) Mateusz Bogusz	Bench	
5	(Brazil) Guilherme	Bench	
8	(Mexico) Héctor Herrera	Bench	
9	(Nigeria) Ibrahim Aliyu	Bench	
11	(Germany) Lawrence Ennali	Bench	
12	(United States) Jack McGlynn	MF	
14	(Brazil) Guilherme	MF	
18	(Poland) Mateusz Bogusz	MF	
18	(Brazil) Guilherme	Bench	
19	(Brazil) Guilherme	MF	
20	(Brazil) Guilherme	Bench	
21	(Argentina) Franco Negri	DF	
21	(United States) Ben Olsen	Coach	
24	(Brazil) Lucas Halter	Bench	
25	(Poland) Mateusz Bogusz	Bench	
25	(Brazil) Guilherme	Bench	
30	(Brazil) Guilherme	MF	
31	(Mexico) Héctor Herrera	MF	
32	(England) Jonathan Bond	Bench	
33	(Brazil) Lucas Halter	DF	
33	(England) Jonathan Bond	Bench	
