= 2025 Houston Dynamo FC season =

Houston Dynamo
2025 season
- Owner: Ted Segal
- General manager: Pat Onstad
- Head coach: Ben Olsen
- Stadium: Shell Energy Stadium
- MLS: Conference: 12th Overall: 22nd
- MLS Cup Playoffs: Did not qualify
- U.S. Open Cup: Round of 16
- Leagues Cup: League phase
- Top goalscorer: League: Ezequiel Ponce (10 goals); All: Ezequiel Ponce (12 goals)
- Average home league attendance: 17,693
Home colors	Away colors

The 2025 Houston Dynamo season was the 20th season of the team's existence since joining Major League Soccer (MLS) prior to the 2006 season.

2025 was the third season under head coach Ben Olsen and the fourth season under GM Pat Onstad and technical director Asher Mendelsohn. It was the fifth season (fourth full season) under majority owner Ted Segal. After making the Playoffs the previous 2 seasons, Houston failed to qualify after finishing 12th in the Western Conference. The Dynamo also competed in the 2025 editions of the U.S. Open Cup and Leagues Cup, but failed to advance far in either competition.

Prior to the start of the season, Houston twice broke the club record for transfer fee received, first on January 16 when Pumas bought Adalberto Carrasquilla for a reported $3.5 million, then again on February 22 when Micael joined Palmeiras for $5 million plus a potential $1 million in add-ons.

== Current squad ==
As of October 19, 2025

Appearances and goals are totals for MLS regular season only.

No.	Name	Nationality	Position	Date of birth (Age)	Signed from	Signed in	Apps.	Goals
Goalkeepers
1	Jimmy Maurer	(United States)	GK	October 14, 1988 (age 37)	FC Dallas	2025	2	0
13	Andrew Tarbell	(United States)	GK	October 7, 1993 (age 32)	Austin FC	2023	9	0
26	Blake Gillingham	(United States)	GK	January 22, 2000 (age 25)	Creighton University	2025	4	0
31	Jonathan Bond	(England)	GK	May 19, 1993 (age 32)	Watford	2025	26	0
Defenders
2	Franco Escobar	(Argentina)	DF	February 21, 1995 (age 30)	Los Angeles FC	2023	75	6
3	Antônio Carlos	(Brazil)	DF	March 7, 1993 (age 32)	Fluminense	2025	8	1
4	Ethan Bartlow (GA)	(United States)	DF	February 2, 2000 (age 25)	University of Washington	2021	80	0
5	Daniel Steres	(United States)	DF	November 11, 1990 (age 34)	LA Galaxy	2022	73	6
22	Pablo Ortiz	(Colombia)	DF	June 8, 2000 (age 25)	DAC Dunajská Streda	2025	20	1
23	Michael Halliday	(United States)	DF	January 22, 2003 (age 22)	Orlando City	2025	0	0
24	Femi Awodesu	(United States)	DF	April 5, 2001 (age 24)	Houston Dynamo 2	2025	24	1
25	Griffin Dorsey	(United States)	DF	March 5, 1999 (age 26)	Toronto FC	2021	131	11
28	Erik Sviatchenko	(Denmark)	DF	October 4, 1991 (age 34)	Midtjylland	2023	63	1
36	Felipe Andrade	(Brazil)	DF	June 8, 2000 (age 25)	Fluminense	2025	23	4
37	Damion Lowe	(Jamaica)	DF	May 5, 1993 (age 32)	Al-Okhdood Club	2025	0	0
Midfielders
6	Artur	(Brazil)	MF	March 11, 1996 (age 29)	Columbus Crew	2023	101	3
8	Amine Bassi	(Morocco)	MF	November 27, 1997 (age 27)	FC Metz	2023	88	15
9	Ondřej Lingr (DP)	(Czech Republic)	MF	October 7, 1998 (age 27)	Slavia Prague	2025	26	3
14	Duane Holmes	(United States)	MF	November 6, 1994 (age 30)	Preston North End	2025	18	1
16	Erik Dueñas	(United States)	MF	October 18, 2004 (age 21)	Los Angeles FC	2025	8	0
18	Diadie Samassékou	(Mali)	MF	January 11, 1996 (age 29)	TSG Hoffenheim	2025	1	0
21	Jack McGlynn	(United States)	MF	July 7, 2003 (age 22)	Philadelphia Union	2025	26	6
27	Sebastian Kowalczyk	(Poland)	MF	August 22, 1998 (age 27)	Pogoń Szczecin	2023	70	5
30	Júnior Urso	(Brazil)	MF	March 10, 1989 (age 36)	Charlotte FC	2025	19	1
34	Sebastian Rodriguez	(United States)	MF	September 13, 2007 (age 18)	Houston Dynamo Academy	2025	0	0
35	Brooklyn Raines (HGP)	(United States)	MF	March 11, 2005 (age 20)	Barça Residency Academy	2022	45	0
Forwards
7	Nelson Quiñónes (U22)	(Colombia)	FW	August 20, 2002 (age 23)	Once Caldas	2022	37	4
10	Ezequiel Ponce (DP)	(Argentina)	FW	March 29, 1997 (age 28)	AEK Athens	2024	42	15
17	Gabriel Segal	(United States)	FW	May 17, 2001 (age 24)	New York City FC	2024	24	4
19	Stephen Annor Gyamfi (GA)	(Ghana)	FW	May 19, 2003 (age 22)	University of Virginia	2024	0	0
20	Sérgio Santos	(Brazil)	FW	September 4, 1994 (age 31)	FC Cincinnati	2025	2	1
33	Exon Arzú	(Honduras)	FW	May 19, 2004 (age 21)	Real España	2024	0	0
37	Lawrence Ennali (U22)	(Germany)	FW	March 7, 2002 (age 23)	Górnik Zabrze	2024	20	2

== Player movement ==
=== In ===
Per Major League Soccer and club policies terms of the deals do not get disclosed.

Date	Player	Position	Age	Previous club	Notes	Ref
January 15, 2024	(United States) Sebastian Rodriguez	MF	16	(United States) Houston Dynamo Academy	Signed as a Homegrown Player, effective January 1, 2025	
December 17, 2024	(United States) Jimmy Maurer	GK	36	(United States) FC Dallas	Signed on a free transfer.	
January 14, 2025	(United States) Erik Dueñas	MF	20	(United States) Los Angeles FC	Signed on a free transfer after claiming him off waivers.	
January 17, 2025	(United States) Obafemi Awodesu	DF	23	(United States) Houston Dynamo 2	Promoted to first team contract.	
February 3, 2025	(United States) Jack McGlynn	MF	21	(United States) Philadelphia Union	Signed for $2.1 million guaranteed, with a conditional $1.3 million and Philadelphia retaining a sell-on fee.	
February 14, 2025	(Brazil) Júnior Urso	MF	35	(United States) Charlotte FC	Signed on a free transfer.	
February 14, 2025	(United States) Blake Gillingham	GK	25	Creighton University	Undrafted free agent.	
February 18, 2025	(United States) Michael Halliday	DF	22	(United States) Orlando City	Acquired in exchange for a 1st round pick in the 2026 MLS SuperDraft. Orlando retains a sell on fee.	
February 19, 2025	(Uruguay) Nicolás Lodeiro	MF	35	(United States) Orlando City	Signed on a free transfer.	
March 11, 2025	(United States) Duane Holmes	MF	30	(England) Preston North End	Signed on a free transfer.	
March 27, 2025	(Colombia) Pablo Ortiz	DF	24	(Slovakia) DAC Dunajská Streda	Signed on loan for the 2025 season.	
March 28, 2025	(Czech Republic) Ondřej Lingr	MF	26	(Czech Republic) Slavia Prague	Signed on a full transfer as a Designated Player for a reported fee of $2.6 million.	
April 11, 2025	(England) Jonathan Bond	GK	31	(England) Watford	Signed on a full transfer for an undisclosed fee.	
April 23, 2025	(England) Toyosi Olusanya	FW	27	(Scotland) St Mirren	Signed on a full transfer for an undisclosed fee. The reported transfer fee is aroun $260k	
May 7, 2025	(Brazil) Felipe Andrade	DF	22	(Brazil) Fluminense	Signed on loan for remainder of season with an option to buy. Had spent the previous 3 months on loan with Dynamo 2.	
July 30, 2025	(Brazil) Antônio Carlos	DF	32	(Brazil) Fluminense	Signed on a free transfer.	
August 23, 2025	(Mali) Diadie Samassékou	MF	29	(Germany) TSG Hoffenheim	Signed on a free transfer.	
September 2, 2025	(Brazil) Sérgio Santos	FW	30	(United States) FC Cincinnati	Claimed off waivers.	
September 2, 2025	(Jamaica) Damion Lowe	DF	32	(Saudi Arabia) Al-Okhdood Club	Signed on a free transfer.	
September 16, 2025	(Brazil) Felipe Andrade	DF	23	(Brazil) Fluminense	Purchase option on the loan activated for an undiscloed fee. Rumored fee is $1.8 million.	

=== Out ===
Date	Player	Position	Age	Destination Club	Notes	Ref
November 6, 2024	(Slovakia) Ján Greguš	MF	33		Contract option declined.	
November 6, 2024	(Mexico) Héctor Herrera	MF	34	(Mexico) Toluca	Contract option declined.	
November 6, 2024	(Venezuela) Júnior Moreno	MF	31	(Argentina) Gimnasia y Esgrima (LP)	Contract option declined.	
November 6, 2024	(Australia) Brad Smith	DF	30	(United States) FC Cincinnati	Contract option declined.	
November 6, 2024	(Senegal) Ousmane Sylla	MF	23	(United States) Orange County SC	Contract option declined.	
November 6, 2024	(Dominican Republic) Xavier Valdez	GK	21	(United States) Nashville SC	Contract option declined.	
November 6, 2024	(United States) McKinze Gaines	FW	26	(United States) New Mexico United	Contract expired.	
November 27, 2024	(Ghana) Latif Blessing	MF	28	(United States) Lexington SC	Contract option declined.	
November 27, 2024	(United States) Steve Clark	GK	38		Contract option declined.	
November 27, 2024	(United States) Tate Schmitt	DF	27	(United States) Nashville SC	Contract option declined.	
January 16, 2025	(Panama) Adalberto Carrasquilla	MF	26	(Mexico) Pumas UNAM	Sold for an undisclosed fee. The reported fee was $3.5 Million.	
January 18, 2025	(Paraguay) Sebastián Ferreira	FW	26	(Argentina) Rosario Central	Released by Houston	
February 22, 2025	(Brazil) Micael	DF	24	(Brazil) Palmeiras	Sold for an undisclosed fee. The reported fee was $5 million, plus a potential $1 million in add-ons, with Houston retaining a sell-on fee.	
April 24, 2025	(Nigeria) Ibrahim Aliyu	FW	23	(United States) Columbus Crew	Traded for $450,000 and a conditional $750,000, with Houston retaining a sell-on fee.	
July 15, 2025	(Uruguay) Nicolás Lodeiro	MF	36	(Uruguay) Nacional	Free transfer	

=== Loans out ===
Date	Player	Position	Age	Destination Club	Notes	Ref
January 23, 2025	(United States) Kieran Sargeant	DF	21	(United States) Lexington SC	Loaned for remainder of 2025.	
January 24, 2025	(Ecuador) Jefferson Valverde	MF	25	(Ecuador) Orense S.C.	Loaned for remainder of 2025.	
August 30, 2025	(England) Toyosi Olusanya	FW	27	(England) Doncaster Rovers	Loaned for remainder of 2025.	

=== MLS SuperDraft ===
Round	Pick	Player	Position	Age	College	Notes	Ref
2	48	Bo Cummins	DF	21	Wake Forest		

== Staff ==
As of December 20, 2024

Executive
Majority owner	(United States) Ted Segal
Minority owners	(United States) Lyle Ayes (United States) James Harden (United States) Tim Howard
General manager/vice president	(Canada) Pat Onstad
Technical director	(United States) Asher Mendelsohn
Assistant general manager	(United States) Nick Kowba
Director of soccer operations	(United States) Francisco Tobar
Coaching staff
Head coach	(United States) Ben Olsen
Assistant coach	(France) Aurélien Collin
Assistant coach	(Venezuela) Juan Guerra
Assistant coach	(Germany) Adin Osmanbašić
Goalkeeper coach	(United States) Tim Hanley
Head of performance	(Republic of Ireland) Paul Caffrey
Head video analyst	(United States) Carlon Carpenter
Head of sports science	(Australia) Alex Calder
Strength & conditioning coach	(United States) Anthony Narcisi
Director of sports medicine	(United States) Craig Devine
Head athletic trainer	(United States) Matt Murphy
Assistant athletic trainer	(United States) Juan Castano
Physical therapist	(United States) Micah Kust
Massage therapist	(United States) Ivan Diaz
Scouting coordinator & analyst	(Uruguay) Sebastian Romero
Director of methodology	(England) Ben Bartlett
Player care manager	(United States) Martha Carvajal
Head equipment manager	(United States) Jaime Gonzalez

== Friendlies ==
=== Preseason ===
January 25	Houston Dynamo	2–2	San Antonio FC	Houston, Texas
11:00 AM CST	Dorsey; Dueñas	Report	Crognale; 57' Trialist	Stadium: Houston Sports Park

January 30	FC Cincinnati	1–1	Houston Dynamo	Clearwater, Florida
11:00 AM CST	Bucha 40'	Report	85' Segal	Stadium: Joe DiMaggio Sports Complex

February 3	New England Revolution	3–3	Houston Dynamo	Fort Lauderdale, Florida
10:00 AM CST	Campana 25'; Yusuf 48'; Dias 97'	Report	Ponce 43', 58'; Dimareli 109'	Stadium: IMG Academy
Note: The match was played over two 60-minute intervals.

February 7	FC Dallas	2–2	Houston Dynamo	Frisco, Texas
11:00 AM CST	Julio; Ntsabeleng 114'	Report	Dueñas 47'; Sviatchenko 69'	Stadium: Toyota Stadium
Note: game featured one 45-minute interval and three 30-minute intervals.

February 12	Columbus Crew	–	Houston Dynamo
5:00 PM CST
Note: closed door friendly

February 15	D.C. United	3–1	Houston Dynamo	Boca Raton, Florida
9:30 AM CST	Benteke 40'; Pirani 65'; Kijima 72'	Report	Ponce 61'	Stadium: FAU Soccer Stadium

=== Regular season ===
March 19 Hybrid friendly	Houston Dynamo	2–1	El Salvador	Houston, Texas
7:00 PM CDT	González 6'; Escobar 43'	Report	Henríquez 4'	Stadium: Shell Energy Stadium

== Competitions ==
=== Major League Soccer ===
==== Standings ====
===== Western Conference =====
MLS Western Conference table (2025)
Pos	Team	Pld	W	L	T	GF	GA	GD	Pts
10	San Jose Earthquakes	34	11	15	8	60	63	−3	41
11	Colorado Rapids	34	11	15	8	44	56	−12	41
12	Houston Dynamo FC	34	9	15	10	43	56	−13	37
13	St. Louis City SC	34	8	18	8	44	58	−14	32
14	LA Galaxy	34	7	18	9	46	66	−20	30

Source: MLS
Rules for classification: 1) points; 2) total wins; 3) total goal differential; 4) total goals scored; 5) fewer disciplinary points; 6) away goal differential; 7) away goals scored; 8) home goals differential; 9) home goals scored; 10) coin toss (2 clubs tied) or drawing of lots (≥3 clubs tied)

===== Overall =====
Overall MLS standings table (2025)
Pos	Team	Pld	W	L	T	GF	GA	GD	Pts
20	San Jose Earthquakes	34	11	15	8	60	63	−3	41
21	Colorado Rapids	34	11	15	8	44	56	−12	41
22	Houston Dynamo FC	34	9	15	10	43	56	−13	37
23	New England Revolution	34	9	16	9	44	51	−7	36
24	St. Louis City SC	34	8	18	8	44	58	−14	32

Source: MLS
Rules for classification: 1) points; 2) total wins; 3) total goal differential; 4) total goals scored; 5) fewer disciplinary points; 6) away goal differential; 7) away goals scored; 8) home goals differential; 9) home goals scored; 10) coin toss (2 clubs tied) or drawing of lots (≥3 clubs tied)

==== Results summary ====
Overall								Home						Away					
Pld	W	D	L	GF	GA	GD	Pts	W	D	L	GF	GA	GD	W	D	L	GF	GA	GD
34	9	10	15	43	56	−13	37	5	3	9	20	30	−10	4	7	6	23	26	−3

==== Results by round ====
Round	1	2	3	4	5	6	7	8	9	10	11	12	13	14	15	16	17	18	19	20	21	22	23	24	25	26	27	28	29	30	31	32	33	34
Stadium	H	H	A	H	A	A	H	A	H	H	A	H	H	A	A	A	H	H	A	H	H	A	H	H	A	A	H	A	H	A	H	A	H	A
Result	L	L	D	L	D	L	W	D	D	W	L	L	W	W	D	W	L	L	L	W	W	L	L	D	D	D	L	W	D	L	W	L	W	D
Position (conf.)	10	15	13	14	13	13	13	13	14	13	14	14	12	10	10	9	9	11	11	10	8	10	11	11	12	12	12	10	10	12	10	12	12	12
Position (league)	22	30	27	29	25	27	25	25	28	24	26	27	23	22	21	19	20	22	22	21	18	20	21	21	23	22	23	20	20	22	20	22	22	22

Updated to match(es) played on October 4, 2025. Source: Match results
A = Away; H = Home; W = Win; D = Draw; L = Loss; P = Postponed

==== Match results ====
February 22 1 Texas Derby	Houston Dynamo	1–2	FC Dallas	Houston, Texas
7:30 PM CST	Bassi 18'; Kowalczyk (yellow card) 32'	Report	Kamungo (yellow card) 25'; Musa 55'; Ibeagha (yellow card) 65'; Ramiro (yellow card) 67'; Julio 76'; Urhoghide (yellow card) 89'	Stadium: Shell Energy Stadium; Attendance: 18,623; Referee: Armando Villarreal

March 2 2	Houston Dynamo	1–4	Inter Miami CF	Houston, Texas
7:30 PM CST	Aliyu (yellow card) 27'; Awodesu (yellow card) 59'; Lodeiro (yellow card) 73', (goal) 85'	Report	Segovia 6', 45+2'; Bright (yellow card) 16'; Allende 37'; Suárez 79'; Afonso (yellow card) 90+2'; Cremaschi (yellow card) 90+4'; Alba (yellow card) 90+5'; Fray (red card) 90+6'	Stadium: Shell Energy Stadium; Attendance: 20,810; Referee: Joe Dickerson

March 8 3	Columbus Crew	0–0	Houston Dynamo	Columbus, Ohio
1:30 PM CST	Farsi (yellow card) 29'; Arfsten (yellow card) 57'	Report	Awodesu (yellow card) 9'; Ponce (yellow card) 21'; Dueñas (yellow card) 65'; Artur (yellow card) 73'	Stadium: Lower.com Field; Attendance: 20,231; Referee: Jon Freemon

March 15 4	Houston Dynamo	1–2	Real Salt Lake	Houston, Texas
7:30 PM CDT	Ponce 16', (yellow card) 90+2'; Escobar (yellow card) 45+5'; Bartlow (yellow card) 58'	Report	Gonçalves 1'; Luna 45+5'; Hidalgo (yellow card) 45+8'	Stadium: Shell Energy Stadium; Attendance: 15,263; Referee: Marcos de Oliveira

March 22 5	Seattle Sounders	0–0	Houston Dynamo	Seattle, Washington
9:30 PM CDT		Report	Bassi (yellow card) 69'; Urso (yellow card) 71'; Steres (yellow card) 78'; Escobar (yellow card) 79'	Stadium: Lumen Field; Attendance: 31,293; Referee: Allen Chapman

March 30 6	Portland Timbers	3−1	Houston Dynamo	Portland, Oregon
6:00 PM CDT	Mora 6', (yellow card) 34'; Chara (yellow card) 11'; Antony 23', 71'; Fory (yellow card) 43'	Report	Escobar 12'; Steres (yellow card) 31'; Dorsey (yellow card) 55'	Stadium: Providence Park; Attendance: 20,206; Referee: Pierre-Luc Lauziere

April 5 7	Houston Dynamo	1–0	Los Angeles FC	Houston, Texas
7:30 PM CDT	Ponce (yellow card) 16'; McGlynn (yellow card) 24', (goal) 58'; Kowalczyk (yellow card) 75'	Report	Martínez (yellow card) 30'; Saldaña (yellow card) 61'; Segura (yellow card) 74'	Stadium: Shell Energy Stadium; Attendance: 16,415; Referee: Filip Dujic

April 12 8	LA Galaxy	1–1	Houston Dynamo	Carson, California
9:30 PM CDT	Garcés (yellow card) 20'; Cerrillo (yellow card) 25'; Jørgensen (red card) 28'; Fagúndez 57'	Report	Ponce 14'; Dorsey (yellow card) 35'	Stadium: Dignity Health Sports Park; Attendance: 23,685; Referee: Joe Dickerson

April 19 9	Houston Dynamo	2–2	Colorado Rapids	Houston, Texas
7:30 PM CDT	Bassi 42'; Lingr 90+6', (yellow card) 90+7'	Report	Mihailovic 58' (pen.); Frederick (yellow card) 71'; Navarro 77'	Stadium: Shell Energy Stadium; Attendance: 17,636; Referee: Malik Badawi

April 26 10 Copa Tejas	Houston Dynamo	2–0	Austin FC	Houston, Texas
7:30 PM CDT	Ponce (yellow card) 27', (goal) 79'; Lingr 61'; Escobar (yellow card) 82'; Dorsey (yellow card) 88'	Report	Biro (yellow card) 24'; Dubersarsky (yellow card) 72'; Svatok (yellow card) 76'; Cascante (yellow card) 84'; Rubio (yellow card) 88'	Stadium: Shell Energy Stadium; Attendance: 17,808; Referee: Chris Penso

May 3 11	Los Angeles FC	2–0	Houston Dynamo	Los Angeles, California
9:30 PM CDT	Ordaz 10'; Martínez (yellow card) 31'; Jesus (yellow card) 56'; Ebobisse 79'	Report	Dorsey (yellow card) 8'; Escobar (yellow card) 25' (yellow-red card) 90+5'	Stadium: BMO Stadium; Attendance: 22,127; Referee: Rosendo Mendoza

May 10 12	Houston Dynamo	1–3	Seattle Sounders	Houston, Texas
7:30 PM CDT	Raines (yellow card) 10'; Awodesu 32', (red card) 38'; Artur (yellow card) 37'	Report	Musovski 22', (yellow card) 45'; Yeimar (yellow card) 34'; Kim (yellow card) 45+10'; Rusnák 46', 58'; De Rosario (yellow card) 84'	Stadium: Shell Energy Stadium; Attendance: 19,802; Referee: Victor Rivas

May 14 13	Houston Dynamo	2–0	Minnesota United	Houston, Texas
7:30 PM CDT	Ortiz (yellow card) 40', (goal) 45+1'; Andrade 77'; Olusanya (yellow card) 89'; Urso (yellow card) 90'	Report	Lod (yellow card) 69'	Stadium: Shell Energy Stadium; Attendance: 14,266; Referee: Jon Freemon

May 17 14 Texas Derby	FC Dallas	0–2	Houston Dynamo	Frisco, Texas
7:30 PM CDT	Acosta (yellow card) 84'; Pedrinho (yellow card) 88'; Urhoghide (yellow card) 90+3'	Report	Raines (yellow card) 44'; McGlynn 64'; Dorsey 81'; Escobar (yellow card) 84'	Stadium: Toyota Stadium; Attendance: 11,004; Referee: Tori Penso

May 24 15	San Jose Earthquakes	3–3	Houston Dynamo	San Jose, California
9:30 PM CDT	Judd 66', 72', (yellow card) 89'; Munie 76'; Roberts (yellow card) 90+7'	Report	Ponce 31', (yellow card) 53'; Andrade 50'; Ortiz (yellow card) 89'; Dorsey 90+1'	Stadium: PayPal Park; Attendance: 15,457; Referee: Sergii Demianchuk

May 28 16	New York City FC	0–3	Houston Dynamo	New York, New York
6:30 PM CDT	Gray (yellow card) 65'; O'Neill (yellow card) 85'; Cavallo (yellow card) 90+2'	Report	Haak 26' (o.g.); Dueñas (yellow card) 35'; Segal 50', 90+4' (pen.); Andrade (yellow card) 63'	Stadium: Yankee Stadium; Attendance: 17,070; Referee: Rubiel Vazquez

May 31 17	Houston Dynamo	1–3	Sporting Kansas City	Houston, Texas
7:30 PM CDT	Kowalczyk 13'; Raines (yellow card) 45+1'; Dorsey (yellow card) 84'; Andrade (yellow card) 86'	Report	Joveljić 45+3', 52'; Bassong (yellow card) 76'; Sallói (yellow card) 82'; Muñóz 88'	Stadium: Shell Energy Stadium; Attendance: 17,852; Referee: Jair Marrufo

June 14 18	Houston Dynamo	1–3	CF Montréal	Houston, Texas
7:30 PM CDT	Lingr (yellow card) 40', (goal) 64'; Ortiz (yellow card) 48'; Holmes (yellow card) 90+8'	Report	Owusu 30', 32'; Neal 54'; Campbell (yellow card) 68'; Bugaj (yellow card) 74'	Stadium: Shell Energy Stadium; Attendance: 17,845; Referee: Lorenzo Hernandez

June 25 19	Minnesota United	3–1	Houston Dynamo	Saint Paul, Minnesota
7:30 PM CDT	Boxall (yellow card) 45+7'; Díaz (yellow card) 52'; Hlongwane 61', 63'; Lod 70'; Yeboah (yellow card) 79'; Pereyra (yellow card) 82'	Report	Dorsey (yellow card) 36'; Andrade 90+4'	Stadium: Allianz Field; Attendance: 18,214; Referee: Sergii Demianchuk

June 28 20	Houston Dynamo	1–0	St. Louis City SC	Houston, Texas
7:30 PM CDT	Ortiz (yellow card) 38'; Ponce 66'; Escobar (yellow card) 90+6'	Report	Zalinsky (yellow card) 2'; Reid (yellow card) 21'; Lundt (yellow card) 42'	Stadium: Shell Energy Stadium; Attendance: 16,886; Referee: Alexis Da Silva

July 5 21	San Diego FC	3–4	Houston Dynamo	San Diego, California
9:30 PM CDT	Iloski 25'; Bombino 54'; Valakari 67'; dos Santos (yellow card) 84'	Report	Ennali 36'; Escobar 45+3'; Lingr (yellow card) 53'; Raines (yellow card) 58'; Bartlow (yellow card) 62'; Ponce 87' (pen.), 90+10'; Bassi (yellow card) 90+1'; Holmes (yellow card) 90+2'; Dueñas (yellow card) 90+14'	Stadium: Snapdragon Stadium; Attendance: 28,320; Referee: Timothy Ford

July 12 22	Real Salt Lake	1–0	Houston Dynamo	Sandy, Utah
8:30 PM CDT	Agada 42', (yellow card) 72'; Ojeda (yellow card) 57'; Caliskan (yellow card) 68'	Report	Andrade (yellow card) 35'; Artur (yellow card) 40'	Stadium: America First Field; Attendance: 19,678; Referee: Chris Penso

July 16 23	Houston Dynamo	0–3	Vancouver Whitecaps	Houston, Texas
7:30 PM CDT	Bassi (yellow card) 34'; Raines (yellow card) 49'; Kowalczyk (yellow card) 76'; Awodesu (yellow card) 89'; Escobar (yellow card) 90+7'	Report	Sabbi 4' (yellow card) 38'; Berhalter (yellow card) 15' (goal) 42'; White (yellow card) 50' (goal) 56'; Johnson (yellow card) 70'	Stadium: Shell Energy Stadium; Attendance: 15,266; Referee: Rubiel Vazquez

July 19 24	Houston Dynamo	1–1	Philadelphia Union	Houston, Texas
7:30 PM CDT	Escobar (yellow card) 38'; McGlynn 45+10' (pen.); Dorsey (yellow card) 46'; Lingr (yellow card) 49'	Report	Bedoya 15'; Mbaizo (yellow card) 17'; Harriel (yellow card) 26'; Uhre (yellow card) 34'; Westfield (yellow card) 74' (red card) 90+9'	Stadium: Shell Energy Stadium; Attendance: 17,390; Referee: Rosendo Mendoza

August 9 26 Copa Tejas	Austin FC	2–2	Houston Dynamo	Austin, Texas
7:30 PM CDT	Sánchez 31'; Desler (yellow card) 37'; Biro 41'; Bukari (yellow card) 50'; Uzuni (yellow card) 63'	Report	Lingr (yellow card) 53'; McGlynn 80' (pen.), 89'	Stadium: Q2 Stadium; Attendance: 20,738; Referee: Alexis Da Silva

August 17 27	Vancouver Whitecaps	1–1	Houston Dynamo	Vancouver, British Columbia
8:00 PM CDT	White 6' (pen.); Cubas (yellow card) 26'; Halbouni (yellow card) 36'	Report	Kowalczyk (yellow card) 39'; Ortiz (yellow card) 42'; Raines (yellow card) 45+1' (yellow-red card) 90+7'; Bassi (yellow card) 65'; Artur 90+1'	Stadium: BC Place; Attendance: 26,031; Referee: Jon Freemon

August 23 28	Houston Dynamo	1–2	San Jose Earthquakes	Houston, Texas
7:30 PM CDT	McGlynn (yellow card) 21'; Ponce (yellow card) 35'; Antônio Carlos 72'	Report	Arango 28'; Kaye (yellow card) 30'; Espinoza (yellow card) 55'; Judd 64'; Roberts (yellow card) 90+3'	Stadium: Shell Energy Stadium; Attendance: 17,359; Referee: Sergii Boiko

August 30 29	St. Louis City SC	2–3	Houston Dynamo	St. Louis, Missouri
7:30 PM CDT	Löwen (yellow card) 43', (goal) 86'; Morales (yellow card) 53'; Joyner 89', (yellow card) 90+1'	Report	Ponce 20', (yellow card) 45+2'; Kessler 50' (o.g.); Antônio Carlos (yellow card) 54'; Andrade (yellow card) 58'; Holmes 72'	Stadium: Energizer Park; Attendance: 22,423; Referee: Ricardo Montero

September 6 25	Houston Dynamo	1–1	LA Galaxy	Houston, Texas
7:30 PM CDT	Ponce 35'; Urso (yellow card) 71'	Report	Yoshida (yellow card) 52'; Cuevas (yellow card) 58'; Pec (yellow card) 90'; Sanabria 90+9'; Nelson (yellow card) 90+10'	Stadium: Shell Energy Stadium; Attendance: 18,471; Referee: Marcos de Oliveira
Note: Match rescheduled from July 25 due to inclement weather in the Houston area.

September 13 30	Colorado Rapids	2–1	Houston Dynamo	Commerce City, Colorado
8:30 PM CDT	C. Bassett 10'; Navarro (yellow card) 51'; Cannon (yellow card) 65'; Andrade 90+6' (o.g.); Aaronson (yellow card) 90+7'	Report	McGlynn 68'; Artur (yellow card) 70' (yellow-red card) 90+8'	Stadium: Dick's Sporting Goods Park; Attendance: 15,128; Referee: Filip Dujic

September 20 31	Houston Dynamo	1–0	Portland Timbers	Houston, Texas
7:30 PM CDT	Ortiz (yellow card) 38'; Ponce 44'; Raines (yellow card) 58'; Dorsey (yellow card) 63'; Urso (yellow card) 70'; Sviatchenko (yellow card) 80'	Report	Ortiz (yellow card) 21'; Župarić (yellow card) 73'	Stadium: Shell Energy Stadium; Attendance: 18,357; Referee: Allen Chapman

September 27 32	Nashville SC	3–1	Houston Dynamo	Nashville, Tennessee
7:30 PM CDT	Mukhtar 2'; Najar (yellow card) 13', (goal) 50'; Yazbek (yellow card) 38'; Surridge 48'	Report	Sviatchenko (red card) 9'; Urso 40'	Stadium: Geodis Park; Attendance: 27,763; Referee: Sergii Boiko

October 4 33	Houston Dynamo	2–4	San Diego FC	Houston, Texas
7:30 PM CDT	Andrade 15'; Ponce (yellow card) 39'; Santos 87'; Ennali (yellow card) 90+1'	Report	Dreyer 53' (pen.), 89'; Godoy (yellow card) 77'; Harangi (yellow card) 78'; Pilcher (yellow card) 83'; de la Torre 85'; Pellegrino 90+13'	Stadium: Shell Energy Stadium; Attendance: 20,732; Referee: Drew Fischer

October 18 34	Sporting Kansas City	0–0	Houston Dynamo	Kansas City, Kansas
8:00 PM CDT	Bassong (yellow card) 44'; Pulskamp (yellow card) 59'	Report	Antônio Carlos (yellow card) 12'; Holmes (yellow card) 20'; Ennali (yellow card) 87'; Urso (yellow card) 89'	Stadium: Children's Mercy Park; Attendance: 16,983; Referee: Nabil Bensalah

=== U.S. Open Cup ===
May 7 Round of 32	Phoenix Rising FC (Arizona)	1–4 (a.e.t.)	(Texas) Houston Dynamo	Phoenix, Arizona
9:00 PM CDT	Johnson (yellow card) 24'; Formella 45+4' (pen.); Smith (yellow card) 50'; Cuello (yellow card) 65'; Okello (yellow card) 70'; Ping (yellow card) 106'	Report	Andrade 17'; Gillingham (yellow card) 45+2'; Kowalczyk (yellow card) 52', (goal) 115'; Dueñas (yellow card) 56'; McGlynn 99'; Ponce 112', (yellow card) 117'	Stadium: Phoenix Rising Soccer Stadium; Attendance: 4,346; Referee: Abdou Ndiaye

May 21 Round of 16	Austin FC (Texas)	3–1	(Texas) Houston Dynamo	Austin, Texas
7:00 PM CDT	Vázquez 29'; Bukari 56' (pen.); Sánchez 60'; Šabović (yellow card) 72'; Cascante (red card) 90+3'	Report	Escobar (yellow card) 67'; Ponce 70'; Raines (yellow card) 82' (yellow-red card) 90+1'	Stadium: Q2 Stadium; Referee: Timothy Ford

=== Leagues Cup ===
July 29 Group Stage	UANL (Mexico)	4–1	(United States) Houston Dynamo	Houston, Texas
8:00 PM CDT	Correa 45+3', 70'; Purata (yellow card) 57'; Lainez 63'; Herrera 90+7'	Report	Andrade (yellow card) 4'; Lingr 47'; McGlynn (yellow card) 60'	Stadium: Shell Energy Stadium; Attendance: 21,792; Referee: Walter López

August 1 Group Stage	Houston Dynamo (United States)	0–2	(Mexico) Mazatlán	Houston, Texas
7:30 PM CDT	Raines (yellow card) 31'; Steres (yellow card) 33'; Segal (yellow card) 43'	Report	Merolla (yellow card) 18'; Almada 25'; Colula (yellow card) 35'; Fábio 57'	Stadium: Shell Energy Stadium; Attendance: 10,126; Referee: Marianela Araya

August 5 Group Stage	Houston Dynamo (United States)	1–2	(Mexico) Pachuca	Houston, Texas
7:30 PM CDT	Bassi 82' (pen.)	Report	Quiñones 25'; Togni 85'; Montiel (yellow card) 90+1'; Alemão (yellow card) 90+5'	Stadium: Shell Energy Stadium; Attendance: 9,383; Referee: Adonis Carrasco

== Player statistics ==
=== Appearances, goals, and assists ===
No.	Pos.	Nat.	Player	Total			MLS			U.S. Open Cup			Leagues Cup		
No.	Pos.	Nat.	Player	Apps	G	A	Apps	G	A	Apps	G	A	Apps	G	A
1	GK	(United States)	Jimmy Maurer	3	0	0	2	0	0	1	0	0	0	0	0
2	DF	(Argentina)	Franco Escobar	25	2	4	23	2	3	2	0	1	0	0	0
3	DF	(Brazil)	Antônio Carlos	8	1	0	8	1	0	0	0	0	0	0	0
4	DF	(United States)	Ethan Bartlow	26	0	2	22	0	2	2	0	0	2	0	0
5	DF	(United States)	Daniel Steres	11	0	0	8	0	0	1	0	0	1	0	0
6	MF	(Brazil)	Artur	37	1	0	33	1	0	2	0	0	2	0	0
7	FW	(Colombia)	Nelson Quiñónes	1	0	0	1	0	0	0	0	0	0	0	0
8	MF	(Morocco)	Amine Bassi	32	3	3	29	2	3	0	0	0	3	1	0
9	MF	(Czech Republic)	Ondřej Lingr	27	4	6	23	3	4	2	0	2	2	1	0
10	FW	(Argentina)	Ezequiel Ponce	35	12	1	32	10	1	2	2	0	1	0	0
11	FW	(Germany)	Lawrence Ennali	21	1	4	18	1	4	0	0	0	3	0	0
12	FW	(England)	Toyosi Olusanya (Note: Loaned out during the season)	9	0	1	6	0	1	1	0	0	2	0	0
13	GK	(United States)	Andrew Tarbell	4	0	0	4	0	0	0	0	0	0	0	0
14	MF	(United States)	Duane Holmes	21	1	0	18	1	0	0	0	0	3	0	0
16	MF	(United States)	Erik Dueñas	11	0	1	8	0	1	2	0	0	1	0	0
17	FW	(United States)	Gabriel Segal	14	2	0	11	2	0	1	0	0	2	0	0
18	MF	(Mali)	Diadie Samassékou	1	0	0	1	0	0	0	0	0	0	0	0
18	FW	(Nigeria)	Ibrahim Aliyu (Note: Transferred out during the season)	8	0	0	8	0	0	0	0	0	0	0	0
19	MF	(Ghana)	Stephen Annor Gyamfi	0	0	0	0	0	0	0	0	0	0	0	0
20	FW	(Brazil)	Sérgio Santos	2	1	0	2	1	0	0	0	0	0	0	0
20	MF	(Uruguay)	Nicolás Lodeiro	18	1	2	16	1	1	2	0	1	0	0	0
21	MF	(United States)	Jack McGlynn	31	7	8	26	6	8	2	1	0	3	0	0
22	DF	(Colombia)	Pablo Ortiz	24	1	0	20	1	0	2	0	0	2	0	0
23	DF	(United States)	Michael Halliday	0	0	0	0	0	0	0	0	0	0	0	0
24	DF	(United States)	Femi Awodesu	29	1	0	24	1	0	2	0	0	3	0	0
25	DF	(United States)	Griffin Dorsey	37	2	6	33	2	6	1	0	0	3	0	0
26	GK	(United States)	Blake Gillingham	5	0	0	4	0	0	1	0	0	0	0	0
27	MF	(Poland)	Sebastian Kowalczyk	34	2	3	29	1	3	2	1	0	3	0	0
28	DF	(Denmark)	Erik Sviatchenko	15	0	0	15	0	0	0	0	0	0	0	0
29	FW	(Honduras)	Exon Arzú	0	0	0	0	0	0	0	0	0	0	0	0
30	MF	(Brazil)	Júnior Urso	22	1	1	19	1	1	1	0	0	2	0	0
31	GK	(England)	Jonathan Bond	28	0	0	26	0	0	0	0	0	2	0	0
32	GK	(Brazil)	Pedro Cruz (Note: Short term loan from Houston Dynamo 2)	1	0	0	0	0	0	0	0	0	1	0	0
34	MF	(United States)	Sebastian Rodriguez	0	0	0	0	0	0	0	0	0	0	0	0
35	MF	(United States)	Brooklyn Raines	27	0	2	22	0	0	2	0	1	3	0	1
36	DF	(Brazil)	Felipe Andrade	28	5	1	23	4	1	2	1	0	3	0	0
37	DF	(Jamaica)	Damion Lowe	0	0	0	0	0	0	0	0	0	0	0	0
37	FW	(Colombia)	Andy Batioja	0	0	0	0	0	0	0	0	0	0	0	0

Source: Season statistics, FBref, and match reports in Competitions

=== Disciplinary record ===
No.	Pos.	Nat.	Player	Total		MLS		U.S. Open Cup		Leagues Cup	
No.	Pos.	Nat.	Player	Booked	Sent off (straight red)	Booked	Sent off (straight red)	Booked	Sent off (straight red)	Booked	Sent off (straight red)
2	DF	(Argentina)	Franco Escobar	10	0	9	0	1	0	0	0
3	DF	(Brazil)	Antônio Carlos	2	2	0	0	0	0	0	0
4	DF	(United States)	Ethan Bartlow	2	0	2	0	0	0	0	0
5	DF	(United States)	Daniel Steres	3	0	2	0	0	0	1	0
6	MF	(Brazil)	Artur	4	0	4	0	0	0	0	0
8	MF	(Morocco)	Amine Bassi	4	0	4	0	0	0	0	0
9	MF	(Czech Republic)	Ondřej Lingr	5	0	5	0	0	0	0	0
10	FW	(Argentina)	Ezequiel Ponce	9	0	8	0	1	0	0	0
11	FW	(United States)	Lawrence Ennali	2	0	2	0	0	0	0	0
12	FW	(England)	Toyosi Olusanya (Note: Loaned out during the season)	1	0	1	0	0	0	0	0
14	MF	(United States)	Duane Holmes	3	0	3	0	0	0	0	0
16	MF	(United States)	Erik Dueñas	4	0	3	0	1	0	0	0
17	FW	(United States)	Gabriel Segal	2	0	1	0	0	0	1	0
18	FW	(Nigeria)	Ibrahim Aliyu (Note: Transferred out during the season)	1	0	1	0	0	0	0	0
21	MF	(United States)	Jack McGlynn	3	0	2	0	0	0	1	0
22	DF	(Colombia)	Pablo Ortiz	6	0	6	0	0	0	0	0
24	DF	(United States)	Femi Awodesu	3	1	3	1	0	0	0	0
25	DF	(United States)	Griffin Dorsey	8	0	8	0	0	0	0	0
26	GK	(United States)	Blake Gillingham	1	0	0	0	1	0	0	0
27	MF	(Poland)	Sebastian Kowalczyk	5	0	4	0	1	0	0	0
28	DF	(Denmark)	Erik Sviatchenko	1	1	1	1	0	0	0	0
30	MF	(Brazil)	Júnior Urso	5	0	5	0	0	0	0	0
35	MF	(United States)	Brooklyn Raines	10	0	7	0	2	0	1	0
36	DF	(Brazil)	Felipe Andrade	5	0	4	0	0	0	1	0

Source: Season statistics and match reports in Competitions

=== Clean sheets ===
No.	Nat.	Player	MLS	Open Cup	Leagues Cup	Total
1	(United States)	Jimmy Maurer	1	0	0	1
13	(United States)	Andrew Tarbell	1	0	0	1
26	(United States)	Blake Gillingham	2	0	0	2
31	(England)	Jonathan Bond	7	0	0	7
32	(Brazil)	Pedro Cruz (Note: Short term loan from Houston Dynamo 2)	0	0	0	0
Total			11	0	0	11

Source: FBref and match reports in Competitions

== Honors and awards ==
=== MLS Team of the Matchday ===
Matchday	Player	Position	Ref.
7	(United States) Griffin Dorsey	DF	
7	(United States) Jack McGlynn	Bench	
9	(Czech Republic) Ondřej Lingr	Bench	
10	(Czech Republic) Ondřej Lingr	Bench	
13	(Brazil) Felipe Andrade	DF	
14	(United States) Griffin Dorsey	DF	
14	(United States) Jack McGlynn	Bench	
15	(United States) Griffin Dorsey	DF	
16	(United States) Gabriel Segal	FW	
16	(United States) Femi Awodesu	Bench	
16	(United States) Ben Olsen	Coach	
21	(Brazil) Felipe Andrade	DF	
22	(United States) Ethan Bartlow	DF	
22	(Argentina) Ezequiel Ponce	FW	
22	(United States) Ben Olsen	Coach	
28	(United States) Jack McGlynn	MF	
29	(Brazil) Artur	MF	
31	(Czech Republic) Ondřej Lingr	MF	
31	(Argentina) Ezequiel Ponce	Bench	
35	(United States) Jack McGlynn	Bench	

=== MLS Goal of the Matchday ===
Matchday	Player	Opponent	Ref.
14	(United States) Jack McGlynn	FC Dallas	
