= Matthew Arana =

Mexican footballer (born 2010)

Personal information
- Full name: Matthew Arana Ibarra
- Date of birth: 28 August 2010 (age 16)
- Place of birth: Texas, United States
- Position: Midfielder

Team information
- Current team: Houston Dynamo
- Number: 22

Youth career
- –2021: RISE Soccer Club
- 2021–: Houston Dynamo

Senior career*
Years	Team	Apps	(Gls)
2026–	Houston Dynamo 2	3	(1)
2026–	Houston Dynamo	1	(0)

International career^{‡}
2024–	Mexico U15	13	(5)
2026–	Mexico U16	1	(0)
- * Club domestic league appearances and goals ‡ National team caps and goals as of 31 March 2026

Matthew Arana Ibarra (born 28 August 2010) is a professional footballer who plays as a midfielder for Houston Dynamo. Born in the United States, he is a Mexico youth international.

== Early life ==
Arana was born on 28 August 2010 in Texas, United States and is a native of Rosharon, Texas, United States. Growing up, he attended Crawford High School in the United States.

== Club career ==
As a youth player, Arana joined the youth academy of American side RISE Soccer Club. Following his stint there, he joined the youth academy of American side Houston Dynamo and was promoted to the club's senior team ahead of the 2026 season.

== International career ==
Arana is a Mexico youth international. On 31 March 2026, he debuted for the Mexico national under-16 football team during a 0–1 away friendly loss to the Portugal national under-16 football team.

== Style of play ==
Arana plays as a midfielder. Argentine newspaper Olé wrote in 2026 that he "is a creative and technical midfielder".
