= Erik Dueñas =

American soccer player

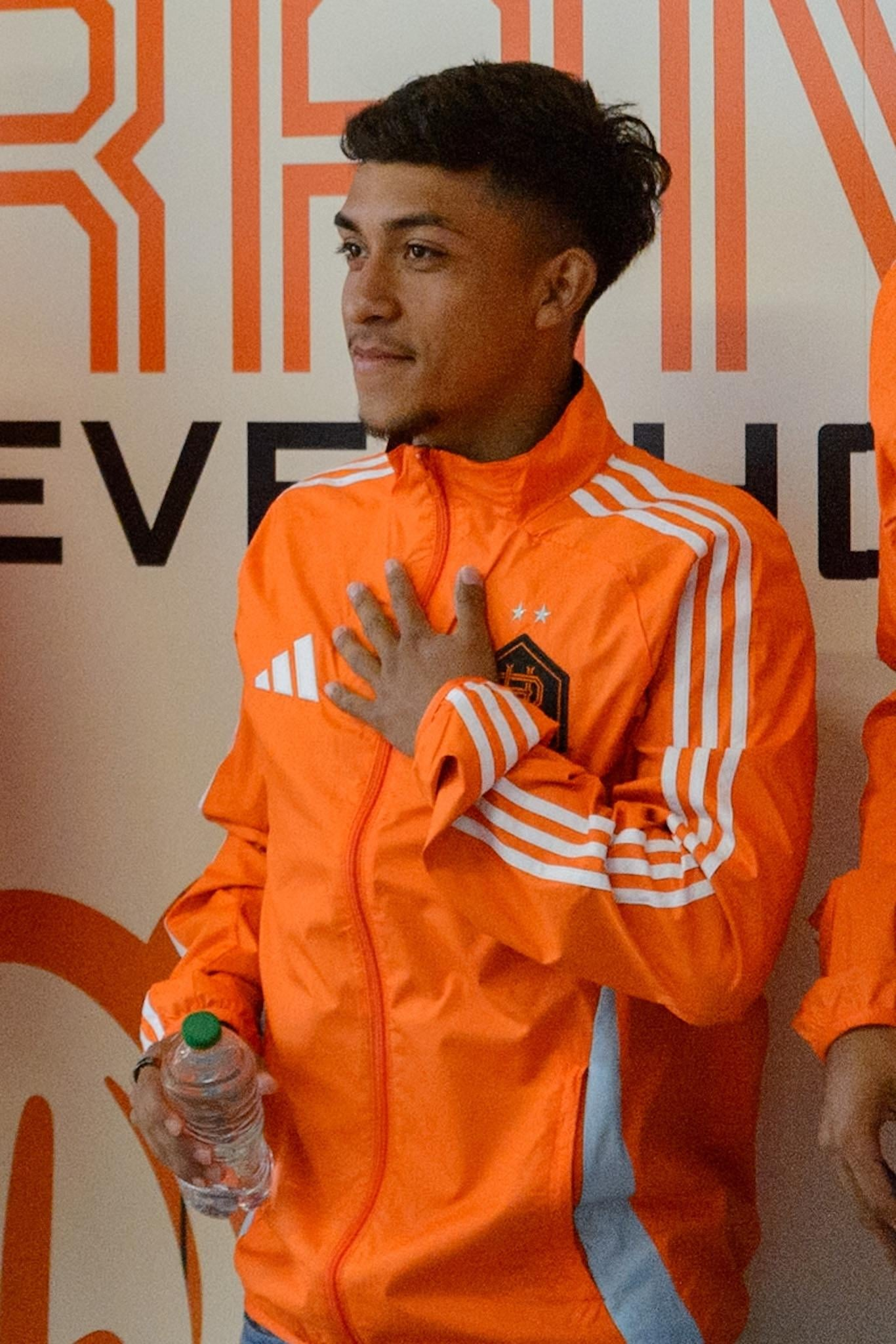
- Dueñas with Houston Dynamo in 2025

Personal information
- Date of birth: October 18, 2004 (age 22)
- Place of birth: Los Angeles, California, US
- Height: 5 ft 5 in (1.64 m)
- Position: Midfielder

Team information
- Current team: Querétaro
- Number: 18

Youth career
- 2016–2020: Los Angeles FC

Senior career*
Years	Team	Apps	(Gls)
2020–2024	Los Angeles FC	34	(0)
2021–2022	→ Las Vegas Lights (loan)	17	(0)
2023–2024	→ Los Angeles FC 2 (loan)	14	(3)
2025	Houston Dynamo	8	(0)
2025	Houston Dynamo 2	7	(0)
2026–	Querétaro	4	(0)
- * Club domestic league appearances and goals as of November 1, 2026

Erik Dueñas (born October 18, 2004) is an American professional soccer player who plays as a midfielder for Liga MX club Querétaro.

== Club career ==
Born in Los Angeles, California, Dueñas began his career at the Los Angeles FC youth academy, being part of the club's inaugural under-12 side.

=== Los Angeles FC ===
On July 8, 2020, Dueñas became one of the first three homegrown signings for Los Angeles FC, alongside fellow Mexican-American teammates Christian Torres and Tony Leone.

Dueñas made his professional debut for Los Angeles FC on October 14, 2020, in a Major League Soccer match against Vancouver Whitecaps. He came on as a 71st-minute substitute for Dejan Jakovic as Los Angeles FC were defeated 1–2.

=== Houston Dynamo FC ===
Houston claimed Dueñas off of waivers following the 2024 season, and in January 2025 signed him to a one-year contract with club options for the following three years. Houston declined his contract option following the 2025 season.

=== Querétaro ===
On December 28, 2025, Dueñas signed with Liga MX club Querétaro ahead of the Clausura.

== International career ==
Born in the United States, Dueñas is of Mexican descent. He was called up to a training camp for the Mexico U17s in February 2021.

== Career statistics ==
As of November 1, 2026

Appearances and goals by club, season and competition
Club	Season	League			National cup		Continental		Other		Total	
Club	Season	Division	Apps	Goals	Apps	Goals	Apps	Goals	Apps	Goals	Apps	Goals
Los Angeles FC	2020	Major League Soccer	2	0	—		—		—		2	0
Los Angeles FC	2023	Major League Soccer	18	0	2	0	4 (Note: Appearance(s) in CONCACAF Champions League)	0	2 (Note: Appearance(s) in Leagues Cup)	0	26	0
Los Angeles FC	2024	Major League Soccer	14	0	2	0	—		4	0	20	0
Los Angeles FC	Total		34	0	4	0	4	0	6	0	48	0
Las Vegas Lights (loan)	2021	USL Championship	6	0	—		—		—		6	0
Las Vegas Lights (loan)	2022	USL Championship	11	0	—		—		—		11	0
Las Vegas Lights (loan)	Total		17	0	—		—		—		17	0
Los Angeles FC 2 (loan)	2023	MLS Next Pro	7	2	—		—		—		7	2
Los Angeles FC 2 (loan)	2024	MLS Next Pro	7	1	—		—		—		7	1
Los Angeles FC 2 (loan)	Total		14	3	—		—		—		14	3
Houston Dynamo	2025	Major League Soccer	8	0	2	0	—		1	0	11	0
Houston Dynamo 2	2025	MLS Next Pro	7	1	—		—		—		7	1
Querétaro	2026–27	Liga MX	4	0	—		—		3	0	7	0
Career total			84	4	6	0	4	0	10	0	104	4

== Honors ==
Los Angeles FC

- U.S. Open Cup: 2024
