= Griffin Dorsey =

American soccer player (born 1999)

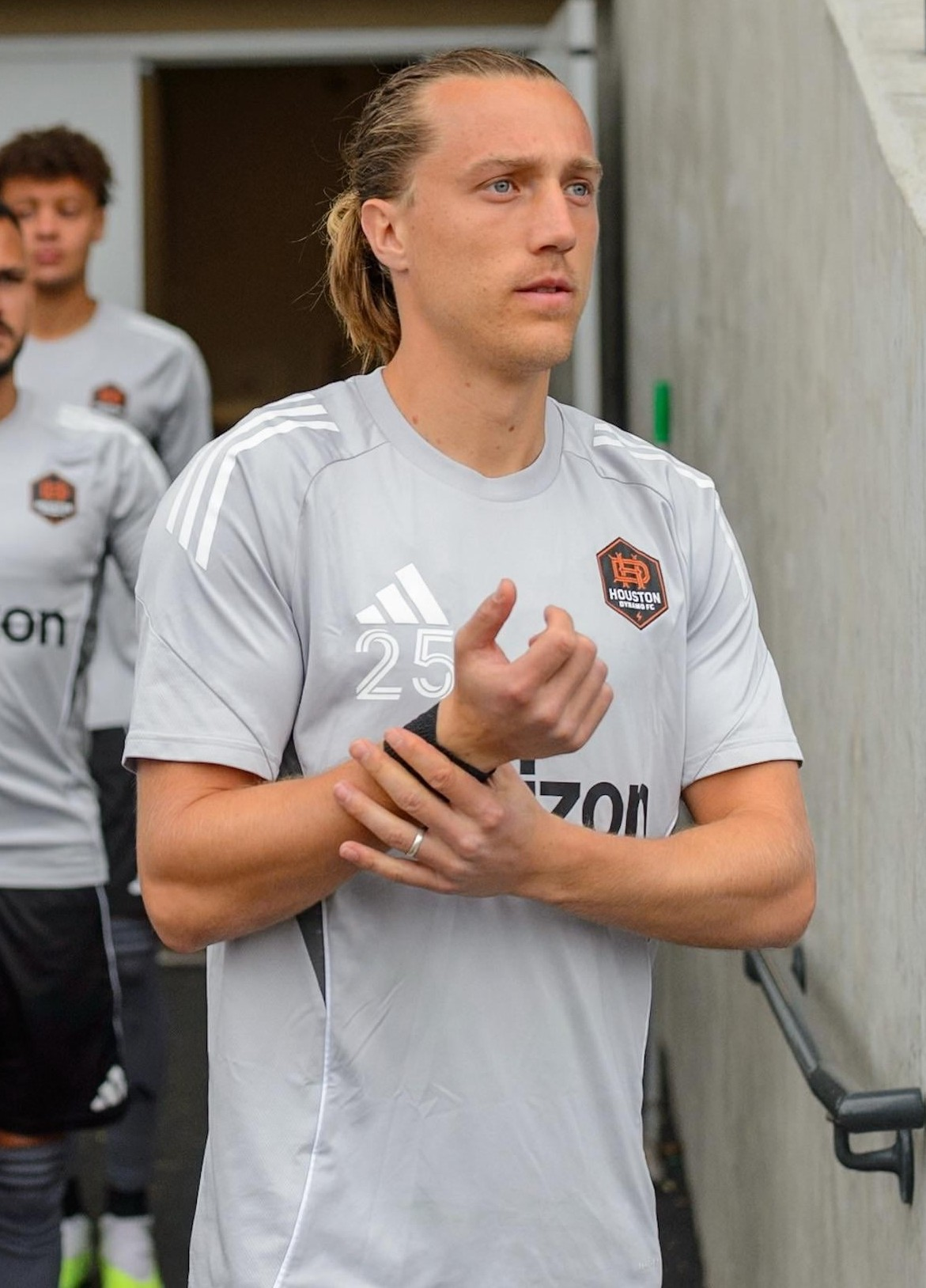
- Dorsey with Houston Dynamo in 2025

Personal information
- Full name: Griffin Lawrence Dorsey
- Date of birth: March 5, 1999 (age 27)
- Place of birth: Evergreen, Colorado, US
- Height: 6 ft 0 in (1.83 m)
- Positions: Right-back; right winger

Team information
- Current team: Orlando City
- Number: 24

Youth career
- 2015–2017: Colorado Rush SC

College career
Years	Team	Apps	(Gls)
2017–2018	Indiana Hoosiers	44	(8)

Senior career*
Years	Team	Apps	(Gls)
2017–2018	Colorado Rapids U23	17	(9)
2019–2021	Toronto FC	2	(0)
2019	→ Toronto FC II (loan)	22	(1)
2021–2026	Houston Dynamo	131	(11)
2023	→ Houston Dynamo 2 (loan)	2	(0)
2026–	Orlando City	22	(3)

International career^{‡}
2017	United States U18	11	(1)
2018	United States U20	5	(1)
- * Club domestic league appearances and goals as of 23:51, November 7, 2026 (UTC) ‡ National team caps and goals as of 22:39, March 7, 2026 (UTC)

Griffin Lawrence Dorsey (born March 5, 1999) is an American professional soccer player who plays as a right-back or right winger for Major League Soccer club Orlando City.

Dorsey played college soccer with the Indiana Hoosiers, but left to sign a Generation Adidas contract in 2019 ahead of the 2019 MLS SuperDraft. Dorsey was picked sixth overall by Toronto FC, but made just five appearances with the team before signing with Houston Dynamo in 2021. With the Dynamo, Dorsey was named the Dynamo Young Player of the Season in his first season and helped win the franchise's second U.S. Open Cup in 2023. In early 2026, Dorsey signed with Orlando City.

== Early career ==
Dorsey played three years with U.S. Soccer Development Academy side Colorado Rush SC. He played college soccer at Indiana University in 2017. During two seasons with the Hoosiers, Dorsey made 44 appearances, scoring eight goals, and tallying eleven assists while helping IU reach the NCAA Tournament both years. During 2017, Indiana reached the NCAA Final, finishing runners up to Stanford. In 2018, Dorsey and Indiana finished the season as Big Ten Conference regular season and Conference Tournament champions. For personal accolades, Dorsey was named a 2nd-Team Freshman All-American by Top Drawer Soccer and College Soccer News, 2nd-Team All-Big Ten, and made the Big Ten All-Freshman Team in 2017. For 2018, he was named a 2nd-Team All-American by United Soccer Coaches and College Soccer News, 3rd-Team All-American by Top Drawer Soccer, and 1st-Team All-Big Ten.

While at Indiana Dorsey also played in the Premier Development League for Colorado Rapids U-23 during the summer.

== Club career ==
=== Toronto FC ===
On January 4, 2019, Dorsey left Indiana to sign a Generation Adidas contract with Major League Soccer (MLS) ahead of the 2019 MLS SuperDraft. On January 11, 2019, Dorsey was drafted in the first round (6th overall) of the 2019 MLS SuperDraft by Toronto FC.

Dorsey made his professional debut on February 19, 2019, starting in a 4–0 CONCACAF Champions League loss to Panamanian side Independiente. He made his MLS debut on June 29, coming off the bench in a 1–1 draw with D.C. United. Dorsey spent the bulk of the 2019 season on loan with the second team, Toronto FC II. He scored his first professional goal on June 12 in a 3–3 draw against North Texas SC. On May 11, 2021, Dorsey was waived by Toronto FC.

=== Houston Dynamo ===
On July 5, 2021, Dorsey signed with MLS side Houston Dynamo. He made his Dynamo debut on July 24, starting in a 1–1 draw against the San Jose Earthquakes. On September 11, he scored his first goal for the Dynamo, scoring in the first minute of a 3–0 win over Austin FC. He was named to the bench for the MLS Team of the Week following his performance against Dallas. Dorsey was named the Dynamo Young Player of the Year in his first season.

=== Orlando City ===
Dorsey with Orlando City in 2026

Dorsey signed with fellow MLS team Orlando City on February 18, 2026 through the 2027–28 season, in exchange for $1,000,000 in general allocation money across two seasons and up to $200,000 in performance-based bonuses. Dorsey made his debut just three days later when he started in a 2–1 loss to the New York Red Bulls. On April 29, Dorsey scored his first goal for Orlando City in a 4–3 win over the New England Revolution in the U.S. Open Cup.

== Career statistics ==
As of match played November 19, 2026

Club	Season	League			National cup (Note: Includes Canadian Championship and U.S. Open Cup)		Continental		Playoffs		Other		Total	
Club	Season	Division	Apps	Goals	Apps	Goals	Apps	Goals	Apps	Goals	Apps	Goals	Apps	Goals
Colorado Rapids U-23	2017	Premier Development League	3	1	—		—		—		—		3	1
Colorado Rapids U-23	2018	Premier Development League	14	8	—		—		0	0	—		14	8
Colorado Rapids U-23	Total		17	9	—		—		0	0	—		17	9
Toronto FC	2019	Major League Soccer	1	0	0	0	1	0	0	0	—		2	0
Toronto FC	2020	Major League Soccer	1 (Note: Includes one appearance in the MLS is Back Tournament group stage)	0	0	0	—		0	0	0	0	1	0
Toronto FC	2021	Major League Soccer	0	0	0	0	2	0	0	0	—		2	0
Toronto FC	Total		2	0	0	0	3	0	0	0	0	0	5	0
Toronto FC II (loan)	2019	USL League One	22	1	—		—		—		—		22	1
Houston Dynamo	2021	Major League Soccer	20	2	—		—		—		—		20	2
Houston Dynamo	2022	Major League Soccer	27	1	2	0	—		—		—		29	1
Houston Dynamo	2023	Major League Soccer	19	3	5	1	—		5	0	4 (Note: Appearances in Leagues Cup)	1	33	5
Houston Dynamo	2024	Major League Soccer	32	3	1	1	4	1	2	0	3	0	42	5
Houston Dynamo	2025	Major League Soccer	33	2	1	0	—		—		3	0	37	2
Houston Dynamo	Total		131	11	9	2	4	1	7	0	10	1	161	15
Houston Dynamo 2 (loan)	2023	MLS Next Pro	2	0	—		—		—		—		2	0
Orlando City	2026	Major League Soccer	22	3	2	2	—		1	0	2	0	27	5
Career total			196	24	11	4	7	1	1	0	12	1	234	30

== Honors ==
Houston Dynamo

- U.S. Open Cup: 2023

Individual

- Dynamo Young Player of the Year: 2021
