= Brooklyn Raines =

Soccer player (born 2005)

- Raines with the New England Revolution in 2026

Personal information
- Full name: Brooklyn Sigel Randolph Raines
- Date of birth: March 11, 2005 (age 21)
- Place of birth: Monrovia, Liberia
- Height: 5 ft 9 in (1.75 m)
- Position: Midfielder

Team information
- Current team: New England Revolution
- Number: 21

Youth career
- 2010–2018: Inter FC Chicago
- 2018–2022: Barça Residency Academy

Senior career*
Years	Team	Apps	(Gls)
2021	El Paso Locomotive	3	(0)
2022–2024	Houston Dynamo 2	37	(1)
2022–2025	Houston Dynamo	45	(0)
2026–	New England Revolution	31	(1)

International career^{‡}
2022	United States U17	1	(0)
2022	United States U19	2	(0)
2024–2025	United States U20	20	(2)
2023–	United States U23	5	(0)
2026–	United States	4	(0)
Medal record
Men's football
Representing United States
CONCACAF U-20 Championship
Runner-up	2024 Mexico
- * Club domestic league appearances and goals as of November 11, 2026 ‡ National team caps and goals as of October 6, 2026

Brooklyn Sigel Randolph Raines (born March 11, 2005) is a professional soccer player who plays as a midfielder for Major League Soccer club New England Revolution. Born in Liberia, he represents the United States national team.

== Club career ==
Raines started his soccer career at the age of three and joined Inter FC Chicago at age five. He left for the Barça Residency Academy at the age of thirteen, where he remained until age sixteen.

=== El Paso Locomotive ===
In September 2021, Raines signed an amateur academy contract with USL Championship club El Paso Locomotive. He made his debut for El Paso on October 17, coming on as a sub in a 5–0 loss to LA Galaxy II. Raines ended the season with 3 appearances. El Paso finished the season 2nd in the Western Conference, but Raines did not appear in the playoffs.

=== Houston Dynamo ===
On February 4, 2022, Raines signed with MLS club Houston Dynamo. The Dynamo acquired his homegrown territory rights from Real Salt Lake in exchange for $50,000 of GAM. Raines made his senior Dynamo debut on April 19, getting the start and playing 74 minutes in a 2–1 win over Rio Grande Valley FC in a U.S. Open Cup game. The match saw Raines become the youngest player in Dynamo history at 17 years and 36 days. On September 4 he made his MLS debut, coming off the bench in a 2–1 loss to Seattle Sounders FC. He ended the season with 4 first team appearances, 3 in the cup and 1 in the league. Raines primarily played for Houston Dynamo 2 in MLS Next Pro during the 2022 season. After a role mostly as a defensive substitute in the MLS in 2023 and 2024, he established himself as a starter for Dynamo in the 2025 season with 20 starts in all competition.

=== New England Revolution ===
On December 23, 2025, the New England Revolution announced the signing of Raines for $1.6 million, plus an additional $400,000 pending certain conditions. He joined via the MLS U22 Initiative on a contract through the 2028–29 season, with the option for a further year. Raines made his Revolution debut in the 2026 season opener on February 21, logging 90 minutes in a 4-1 defeat to Nashville SC. He scored the first goal of his career and tallied the first assist of his career on July 25 in a 4-1 win over Atlanta United FC.

== International career ==
Born in Monrovia, Liberia, Raines has represented the United States at youth international level. Raines looked up to Liberian-American midfielder Darlington Nagbe growing up. Raines represented the United States at the 2023 Pan American Games, starting all 5 matches in a 4th-place finish. In the 2024 CONCACAF U-20 Championship, he started 5 of 6 matches in a 2nd-place finish, scoring a dramatic 86th-minute winner from 30 yards out in the semi-final against Panama.

== Personal life ==
Raines was raised in Chicago after being adopted from Liberia at 15 months old. He moved with his family to Arizona at the age of 13 in order to join the Barca Residency Academy in Casa Grande. One of five adopted siblings, Raines has spoken in support of M.D. Anderson Cancer Center, where his adoptive mother was treated for cancer in 2020.

== Career statistics ==
=== Club ===
As of April 30, 2025

Club	Season	League			National cup		Playoffs		Continental		Other		Total	
Club	Season	Division	Apps	Goals	Apps	Goals	Apps	Goals	Apps	Goals	Apps	Goals	Apps	Goals
El Paso Locomotive	2021	USL Championship	3	0	–		–		–		–		3	0
Houston Dynamo 2	2022	MLS Next Pro	17	1	–		–		–		–		17	1
Houston Dynamo 2	2023	MLS Next Pro	13	0	–		–		–		–		13	0
Houston Dynamo 2	2024	MLS Next Pro	7	0	–		–		–		–		7	0
Houston Dynamo 2	Total		37	1	–		–		–		–		37	1
Houston Dynamo	2022	MLS	1	0	3	0	–		–		–		4	0
Houston Dynamo	2023	MLS	7	0	3	1	–		–		–		10	1
Houston Dynamo	2024	MLS	17	0	–		2	0	2 (Note: Appearances in CONCACAF Champions Cup)	0	1	0	20	0
Houston Dynamo	2025	MLS	19	0	3	0	–		–		2	0	0	0
Houston Dynamo	Total		43	0	9	1	2	0	2	0	3	0	59	1
Career total			83	1	9	1	2	0	2	0	3	0	99	2

=== International ===
As of match played October 6, 2026

Appearances and goals by national team and year
National team	Year	Apps	Goals
United States	2026	4	0
Total		4	0

== Honors ==
Houston Dynamo

- U.S. Open Cup: 2023
