= Jack McGlynn =

American soccer player (born 2003)

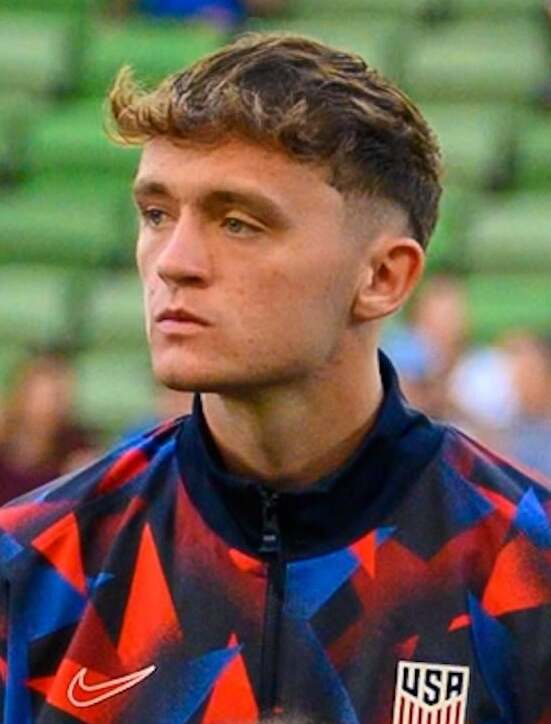
- McGlynn with the United States in 2025

Personal information
- Full name: Jack Ryan McGlynn
- Date of birth: July 7, 2003 (age 23)
- Place of birth: Middle Village, Queens, New York, U.S.
- Height: 6 ft 0 in (1.82 m)
- Position: Midfielder

Team information
- Current team: Stoke City
- Number: 7

Youth career
- 2015–2019: BW Gottschee
- 2019–2020: Philadelphia Union

Senior career*
Years	Team	Apps	(Gls)
2020–2022	Philadelphia Union II	19	(6)
2021–2024	Philadelphia Union	99	(7)
2025–2026	Houston Dynamo	44	(8)
2026–	Stoke City	12	(5)

International career^{‡}
2019	United States U16	5	(0)
2021–2023	United States U20	21	(2)
2023–2024	United States U23	11	(0)
2024–	United States	13	(2)
Medal record
Representing United States
Men's football
CONCACAF Gold Cup
Runner-up	2025 Canada–United States
- * Club domestic league appearances and goals as of 20:33, 21 November 2026 (UTC) ‡ National team caps and goals as of September 9, 2025

Jack Ryan McGlynn (born July 7, 2003) is an American professional soccer player who plays as a midfielder for EFL Championship club Stoke City and the United States national team.

== Club career ==
=== Early career ===
Born in Middle Village, New York, McGlynn started his career with BW Gottschee Academy, a prominent soccer academy in New York City. In 2019, McGlynn moved to Philadelphia and joined the youth academy at the Philadelphia Union. During the 2019–20 academy season, McGlynn scored seven goals and on March 6, 2020, he signed a professional contract with the Union's reserve affiliate, Philadelphia Union II for the 2020 season.

On March 7, 2020, a day after signing with Union II, McGlynn made his competitive debut for the side in the USL Championship against Loudoun United. He came on as an 82nd-minute substitute for Luis Flores as Union II drew 0–0. On August 5, McGlynn scored his first professional goal against New York Red Bulls II. His first-half stoppage time goal was the equalizer in a 3–2 victory for the Union II. McGlynn finished the season for Philadelphia Union II with five goals in fourteen matches.

=== Philadelphia Union ===
On August 20, 2020, McGlynn signed a pre-homegrown player deal with the Philadelphia Union, joining the club for the 2021 season. He made his debut for the Union on April 14, 2021, in a 4–0 victory over Deportivo Saprissa in the CONCACAF Champions League, coming on as a 68th-minute substitute for Leon Flach. McGlynn's debut in Major League Soccer came on April 24 against Inter Miami, coming on as a late substitute for Ilsinho.

=== Houston Dynamo ===
On February 3, 2025, McGlynn was sold to Houston Dynamo in for a $2.1 million transfer fee. Philadelphia would also retain a sell-on percentage of any future transfer, as well as potentially receiving a further $1.3 million if certain performance-based metrics are met.

=== Stoke City ===
On September 1, 2026, McGlynn joined EFL Championship club Stoke City for an undisclosed fee, signing a three-year contract. On September 12, he scored his first goal for the club in a 2–1 victory over Watford.

== International career ==
=== 2019–2024: Youth level ===
McGlynn made his international debut for the United States at the under-16 level, playing against the Netherlands on November 14, 2019. Jack is also eligible to represent Ireland due to dual citizenship through his Irish born father, and he has been approached by the Football Association of Ireland to do so if he chooses.

In November 2025, McGlynn announced his allegiance to the United States, stating that he "always felt American and a New Yorker". On October 8, 2023, McGlynn was called up to the United States under-23 national team ahead of friendlies against Mexico and Japan.

On July 8, 2024 McGlynn was called up to the United States under-23 national team for the 2024 Summer Olympics. He would go on to play in every match, starting in their 4–0 loss to Morocco in the quarterfinals.

=== 2024–2025: Senior debut and first CONCACAF Gold Cup ===
On January 5, 2024, McGlynn received his first call-up to the senior national team for January training in Orlando ahead of a friendly against Slovenia. On January 20, McGlynn came on as a substitute for Josh Atencio in the 61st minute in their 1–0 loss to Slovenia.

On January 18, 2025, McGlynn scored his first goal for the senior team when he opened up the scoring in a 3–1 friendly win over Venezuela. McGlynn was selected by Mauricio Pochettino for friendlies against Turkey and Switzerland on May 22, and he was later named to the squad for the 2025 CONCACAF Gold Cup on June 5.

== Personal life ==
McGlynn is the younger brother of Conor McGlynn, who is also a professional soccer player for USL League One club Westchester SC. On July 25, 2020, both Jack and Conor played against each other for Philadelphia Union II and Hartford Athletic respectively in the USL Championship. They played against each other again on September 23, in which Jack scored the equalizer for Union II in a 1–1 draw.

== Career statistics ==
=== Club ===
As of match played November 21, 2026

Appearances and goals by club, season and competition
Club	Season	League			National cup (Note: Includes U.S. Open Cup, FA Cup)		League cup (Note: Includes EFL Cup)		Continental		Other		Total	
Club	Season	Division	Apps	Goals	Apps	Goals	Apps	Goals	Apps	Goals	Apps	Goals	Apps	Goals
Philadelphia Union II	2020	USL Championship	14	5	—		—		—		—		14	5
Philadelphia Union II	2022	MLS Next Pro	5	1	—		—		—		—		5	1
Philadelphia Union II	Total		19	6	—		—		—		—		19	6
Philadelphia Union	2021	Major League Soccer	19	0	—		—		3 (Note: Appearances in CONCACAF Champions Cup)	0	3 (Note: Appearances in MLS Cup playoffs)	0	25	0
Philadelphia Union	2022	Major League Soccer	23	1	1	0	—		—		3	0	27	1
Philadelphia Union	2023	Major League Soccer	27	2	1	0	—		6	0	10 (Note: Seven appearances in Leagues Cup and three in MLS Cup playoffs)	1	44	3
Philadelphia Union	2024	Major League Soccer	30	4	—		—		4	0	5 (Note: Appearances in Leagues Cup)	0	39	4
Philadelphia Union	Total		99	7	2	0	—		13	0	21	1	135	8
Houston Dynamo	2025	Major League Soccer	26	6	2	1	—		—		3	0	31	7
Houston Dynamo	2026	Major League Soccer	18	2	2	0	—		—		—		20	2
Houston Dynamo	Total		44	8	4	1	—		0	0	3	0	51	9
Stoke City	2026–27	EFL Championship	12	5	0	0	0	0	—		—		12	5
Career total			174	24	6	1	0	0	13	0	24	1	217	28

=== International ===
As of match played September 9, 2025

Appearances and goals by national team and year
National team	Year	Apps	Goals
United States	2024	1	0
United States	2025	12	2
Total		13	2

United States score listed first, score column indicates score after each McGlynn goal.

List of international goals scored by Jack McGlynn
No.	Date	Venue	Cap	Opponent	Score	Result	Competition
1	January 18, 2025	Chase Stadium, Fort Lauderdale, United States	2	Venezuela	1–0	3–1	Friendly
2	June 7, 2025	Pratt & Whitney Stadium, East Hartford, United States	5	Turkey	1–0	1–2	Friendly

== Honors ==
Philadelphia Union

- MLS Cup runner-up: 2022

United States U20

- CONCACAF U-20 Championship: 2022
