= Ethan Bartlow =

American soccer player (born 2000)

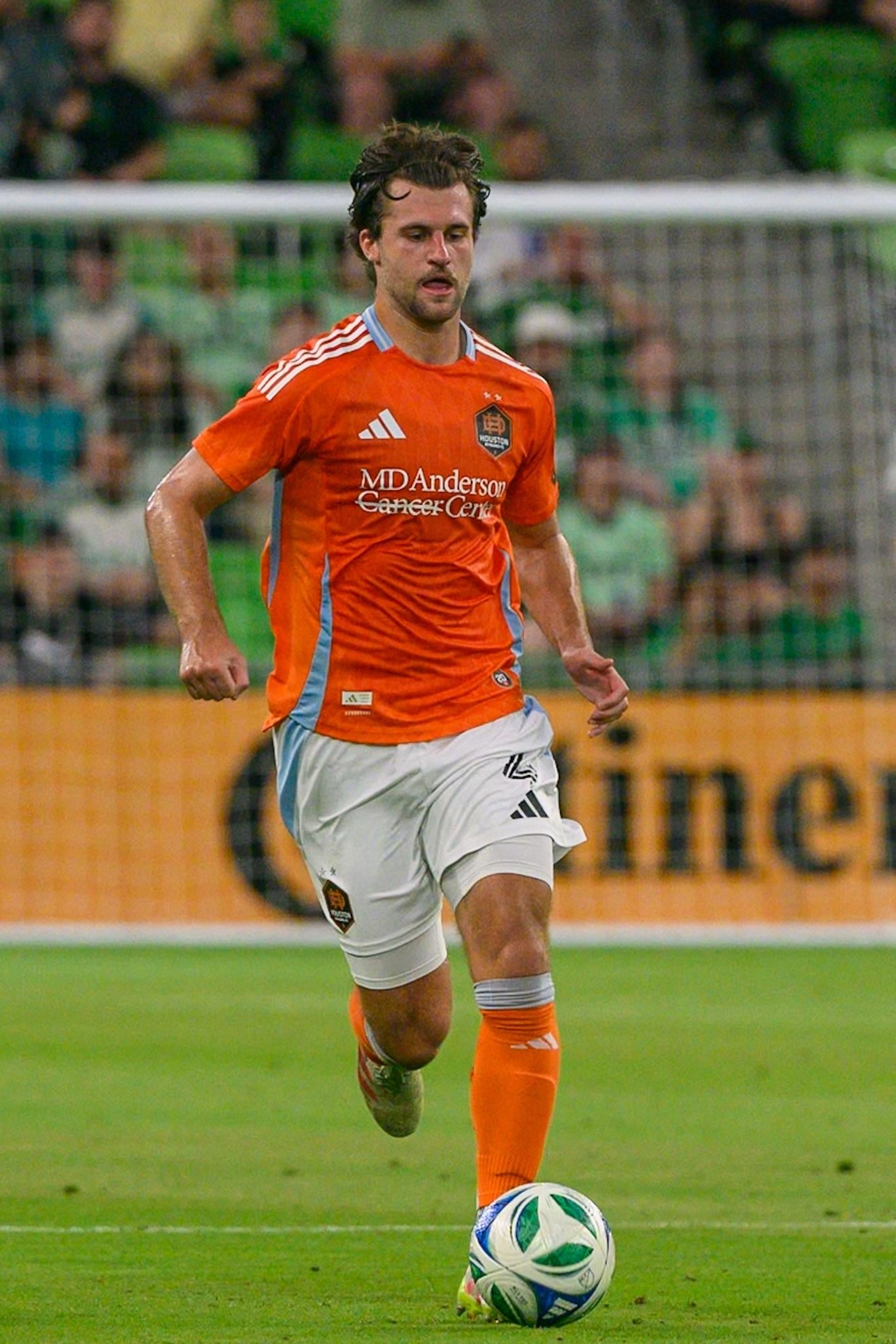
- Bartlow in 2025

Personal information
- Full name: Ethan Andrew Bartlow
- Date of birth: February 2, 2000 (age 26)
- Place of birth: Woodinville, Washington, U.S.
- Height: 6 ft 0 in (1.83 m)
- Position: Defender

Team information
- Current team: Tampa Bay Rowdies on loan from Sporting Kansas City
- Number: 21

Youth career
- 2015–2018: Crossfire Premier

College career
Years	Team	Apps	(Gls)
2018–2020	Washington Huskies	38	(6)

Senior career*
Years	Team	Apps	(Gls)
2019	Crossfire Redmond	10	(0)
2021–2025	Houston Dynamo	80	(0)
2022	Houston Dynamo 2	2	(0)
2026–	Sporting Kansas City	11	(0)
2026–	→ Tampa Bay Rowdies (loan)	6	(0)

International career^{‡}
2018–2019	United States U17	3	(0)
- * Club domestic league appearances and goals as of November 7, 2026 ‡ National team caps and goals as of January 21, 2021

Ethan Andrew Bartlow (born February 2, 2000) is an American professional soccer player who plays as a defender for USL Championship side Tampa Bay Rowdies on loan from Major League Soccer club Sporting Kansas City.

== Youth career ==
Playing for USSDA side Crossfire Premier SC, Bartlow scored seven goals in 27 games.

== College and amateur career ==
As a freshman in 2018, Bartlow started 18 games for the University of Washington. He scored his first goal for Washington on November 9, 2018, in Washington's 2–0 win over Oregon State. He was named to the All-Pac-12 third team following the season.

During the 2019 season, Bartlow played in 20 matches for the Huskies and scored 5 goals, including two goals in Washington's NCAA Tournament 3rd round win over Marshall, helping the Huskies win the PAC-12 regular season title and reach the quarterfinals of the NCAA tournament. Bartlow was named Pac-12 Defensive Player of the Year and was named to the All-Pac-12 first team. He also made the United Soccer Coaches All-American second team.

Bartlow also played with National Premier Soccer League side Crossfire Redmond during their 2019 season.

== Professional career ==
=== Houston Dynamo ===
Bartlow signed a Generation Adidas contract on January 19, 2021. He was selected 6th overall by the Houston Dynamo in the 2021 MLS SuperDraft. Bartlow made no appearances during his rookie season after he suffered a concussion in preseason that kept him sidelined through August and the mid-season arrival of DP centerback Teenage Hadebe placed Bartlow low on the depth chart.

He made his professional debut playing for the team's MLS Next Pro side on March 26, 2022, playing the full 90 minutes in a 1–0 win over Whitecaps FC 2. Bartlow made his debut for the first team on April 2, starting in a 3–1 win over Inter Miami. He made 15 MLS appearances, 9 of them starts, during the season as the Dynamo finished 13th in the Western Conference, missing out on the playoffs. Bartlow also made 2 appearances in the U.S. Open Cup.

Houston declined his contract option following the 2025 season.

=== Tampa Bay Rowdies ===
In August, 2026 Tampa Bay Rowdies announced they had acquired Bartlow on loan from Sporting Kansas City for the remainder of the 2026 USL Championship season.

== International career ==
Bartlow earned three caps for the United States men's national under-17 soccer team in 2016.

== Career statistics ==
As of match played September 26, 2026

Appearances and goals by club, season and competition
Club	Season	League			National cup (Note: Includes appearances in U.S. Open Cup)		League Cup		Continental		Other		Total	
Club	Season	Division	Apps	Goals	Apps	Goals	Apps	Goals	Apps	Goals	Apps	Goals	Apps	Goals
Crossfire Redmond	2019	NPSL	10	0	—		2 (Note: Includes appearances in Nataional Premier Soccer League playoffs)	1	—		—		12	1
Houston Dynamo	2021	Major League Soccer	0	0	—		—		—		—		0	0
Houston Dynamo	2022	Major League Soccer	15	0	2	0	—		—		—		17	0
Houston Dynamo	2023	Major League Soccer	27	0	5	0	0	0	—		0	0	32	0
Houston Dynamo	2024	Major League Soccer	16	0	1	0	0	0	3 (Note: Includes appearances in CONCACAF Champions Cup)	0	1 (Note: Includes appearances in Leagues Cup)	0	21	0
Houston Dynamo	2025	Major League Soccer	22	0	2	0	0	0	0	0	2	0	26	0
Houston Dynamo	Total		80	0	10	0	0	0	3	0	3	0	96	0
Houston Dynamo 2 (loan)	2022	MLS Next Pro	2	0	—		1 (Note: Includes appearance in MLS Next Pro playoff)	0	—		—		3	0
Sporting Kansas City	2026	Major League Soccer	11	0	1	0	0	0	—		—		12	0
Tampa Bay Rowdies (loan)	2026	USL Championship	7	0	—		0	0	—		—		7	0
Career Total			110	0	11	0	3	1	3	0	3	0	130	1

== Honors ==
Houston Dynamo

- U.S. Open Cup: 2023
