= Pablo Ortiz (footballer, born 2000) =

Colombian footballer (born 2000)

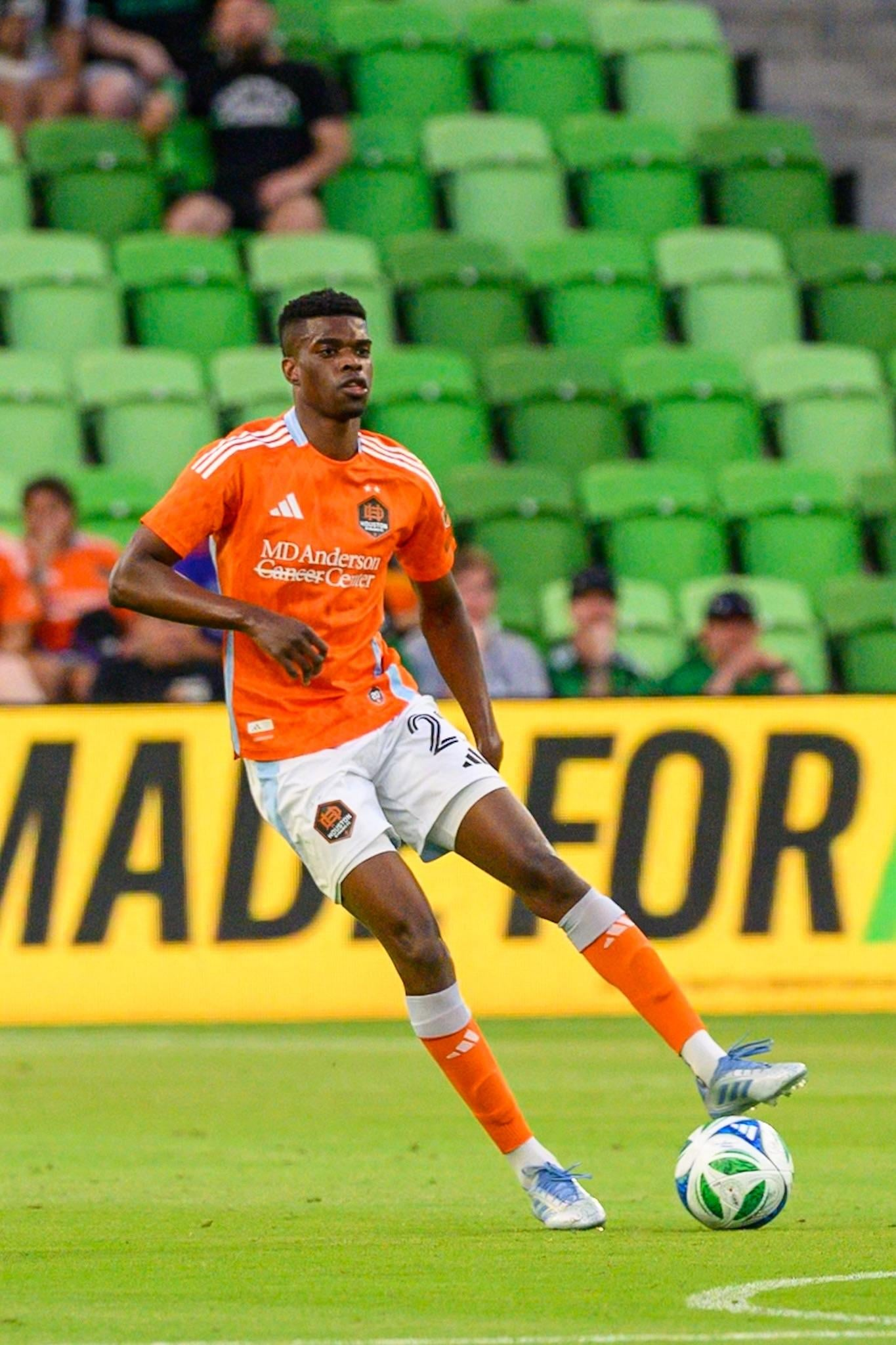

Personal information
- Full name: Pablo Antonio Ortiz Cabezas
- Date of birth: 8 June 2000 (age 26)
- Place of birth: Tumaco, Colombia
- Height: 1.90 m (6 ft 3 in)
- Position: Centre-back

Team information
- Current team: Atlético Junior (on loan from Baník Ostrava)

Youth career
- América de Cali

Senior career*
Years	Team	Apps	(Gls)
2020–2022	América de Cali	47	(0)
2022	→ Midtjylland (loan)	0	(0)
2022–2024	Midtjylland	3	(0)
2023	→ Mafra (loan)	0	(0)
2023–2024	→ Pardubice (loan)	22	(0)
2023	→ Pardubice B (loan)	1	(0)
2024–2026	DAC 1904	13	(0)
2025	→ Houston Dynamo (loan)	20	(1)
2026–	Baník Ostrava	1	(0)
2026	Baník Ostrava B	2	(0)
2026–	→ Atlético Junior (loan)	0	(0)
- * Club domestic league appearances and goals as of 25 May 2026

Pablo Antonio Ortiz Cabezas (born 8 June 2000) is a Colombian professional footballer who plays as a centre-back for Liga DIMAYOR club Atlético Junior on loan from Baník Ostrava.

== Career ==
On 4 February 2022, Ortiz was loaned out to Danish Superliga club FC Midtjylland for 18 months from América de Cali with a purchase option. However, already on 13 July 2022, Midtjylland decided to trigger the purchase option and buy him free from his contract with América de Cali, with Ortíz signing a deal with the Danish club until June 2027. On transfer deadline day, 31 January 2023, Ortíz joined Liga Portugal 2 club Mafra on a loan deal for the remainder of the season.

On 7 September 2023, Ortiz joined Czech First League side Pardubice on a loan deal for the 2023–24 season. Gartenmann was back in Midtjylland for the pre-season ahead of the 2024–25 season.

On 30 August 2024, Ortiz joined Slovak Niké liga side DAC Dunajská Streda.

On 27 January 2026, Ortiz signed a contract with Czech First League club Baník Ostrava until 2029.

On 12 July 2026, Ortiz joined Liga DIMAYOR club Atlético Junior on a one-year loan deal with option to make the transfer permanent.

== Career statistics ==
=== Club ===
As of 31 January 2022

Appearances and goals by club, season and competition
Club	Season	League			Cup		Continental		Other		Total	
Club	Season	Division	Apps	Goals	Apps	Goals	Apps	Goals	Apps	Goals	Apps	Goals
América de Cali	2020	Categoría Primera A	10	0	1	0	0	0	0	0	11	0
América de Cali	2021	Categoría Primera A	35	0	0	0	7	0	0	0	42	0
América de Cali	Total		45	0	1	0	7	0	0	0	53	0
FC Midtjylland	2022	Danish Superliga	0	0	0	0	0	0	0	0	0	0
Career total			45	0	1	0	7	0	0	0	53	0
