= Felipe Andrade =

Brazilian footballer (born 2002)

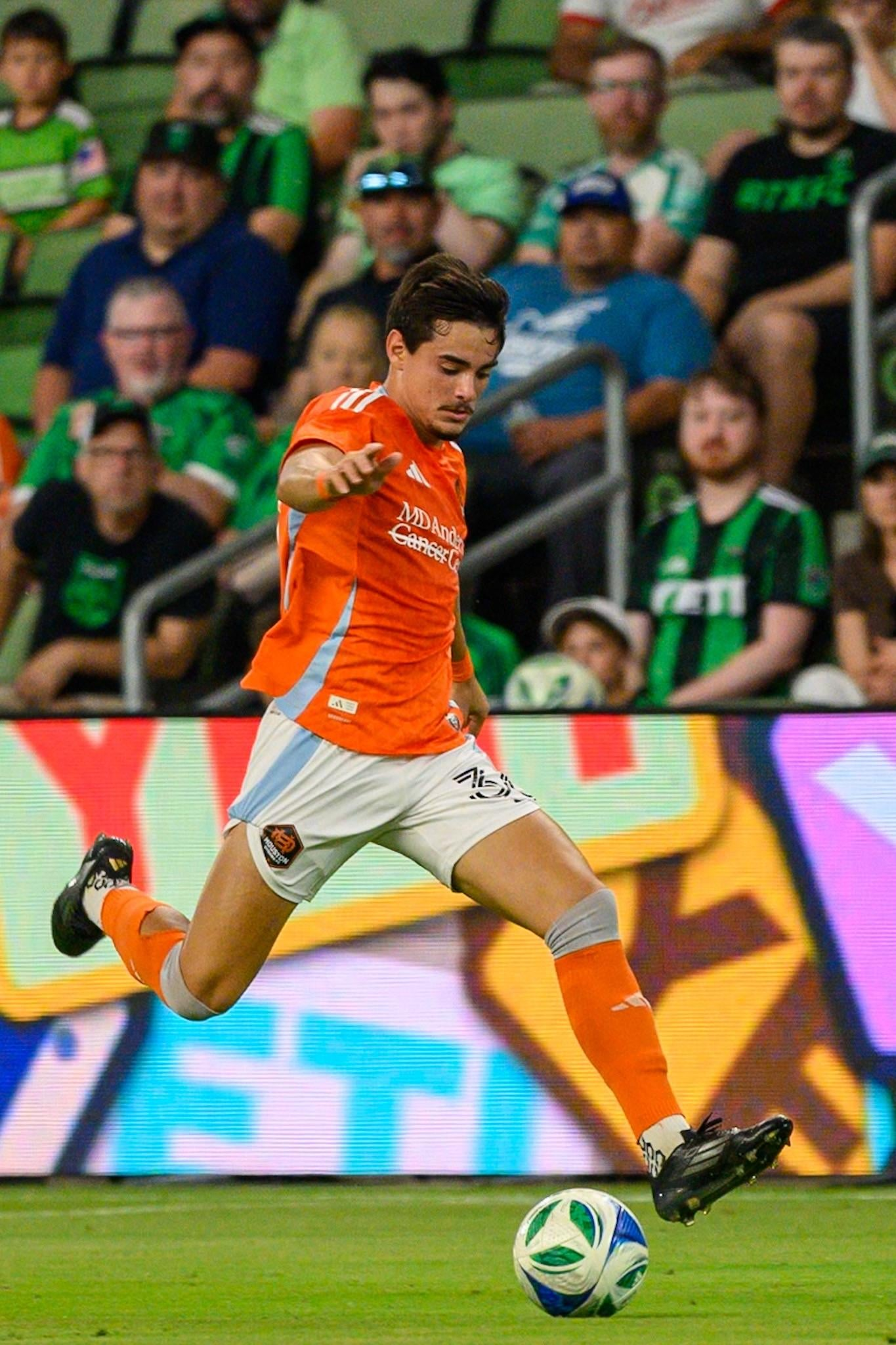
- Felipe Andrade in 2025

Personal information
- Full name: Felipe de Andrade Vieira
- Date of birth: 29 May 2002 (age 24)
- Place of birth: Boa Viagem, Brazil
- Height: 1.82 m (6 ft 0 in)
- Position: Centre back

Team information
- Current team: Houston Dynamo
- Number: 36

Youth career
- 2017–2023: Fluminense

Senior career*
Years	Team	Apps	(Gls)
2023–2025	Fluminense	22	(0)
2025	→ Houston Dynamo 2 (loan)	6	(0)
2025	→ Houston Dynamo (loan)	23	(4)
2025–	Houston Dynamo	23	(1)
- * Club domestic league appearances and goals as of 19:30, 25 October 2025 (UTC)

Felipe de Andrade Vieira (born 29 May 2002), known as Felipe Andrade, is a Brazilian footballer who plays as a central defender for Houston Dynamo.

== Career ==
=== Fluminense ===
Born in Boa Viagem, Ceará, Felipe Andrade joined Fluminense's youth setup in 2017, after impressing on a trial in his hometown. On 22 July 2021, he renewed his contract with the club until the end of 2024.

Felipe Andrade made his first team – and Série A – debut on 21 June 2023, coming on as a second-half substitute for Guga in a 1–1 home draw against Atlético Mineiro.

=== Houston Dynamo ===
On 2025, he was transferred to Houston Dynamo 2 in a loan for the 2025 season. On 8 May 2025, Andrade's loan was extended and he joined Houston's Major League Soccer side. Houston made the move permanent on 16 September 2025.

== Career statistics ==
As of 15 February 2024.

Appearances and goals by club, season and competition
Club	Season	League			State League		Cup		Continental		Other		Total	
Club	Season	Division	Apps	Goals	Apps	Goals	Apps	Goals	Apps	Goals	Apps	Goals	Apps	Goals
Fluminense	2023	Série A	7	0	0	0	0	0	1 (Note: Appearance(s) in Copa Libertadores)	0	—		8	0
Fluminense	2024	Série A	0	0	6	0	0	0	0	0	—		2	0
Career total			7	0	6	0	0	0	1	0	0	0	14	0

== Honours ==
Fluminense

- Copa Libertadores: 2023
- Recopa Sudamericana: 2024
