= Lawrence Ennali =

German footballer (born 2002)

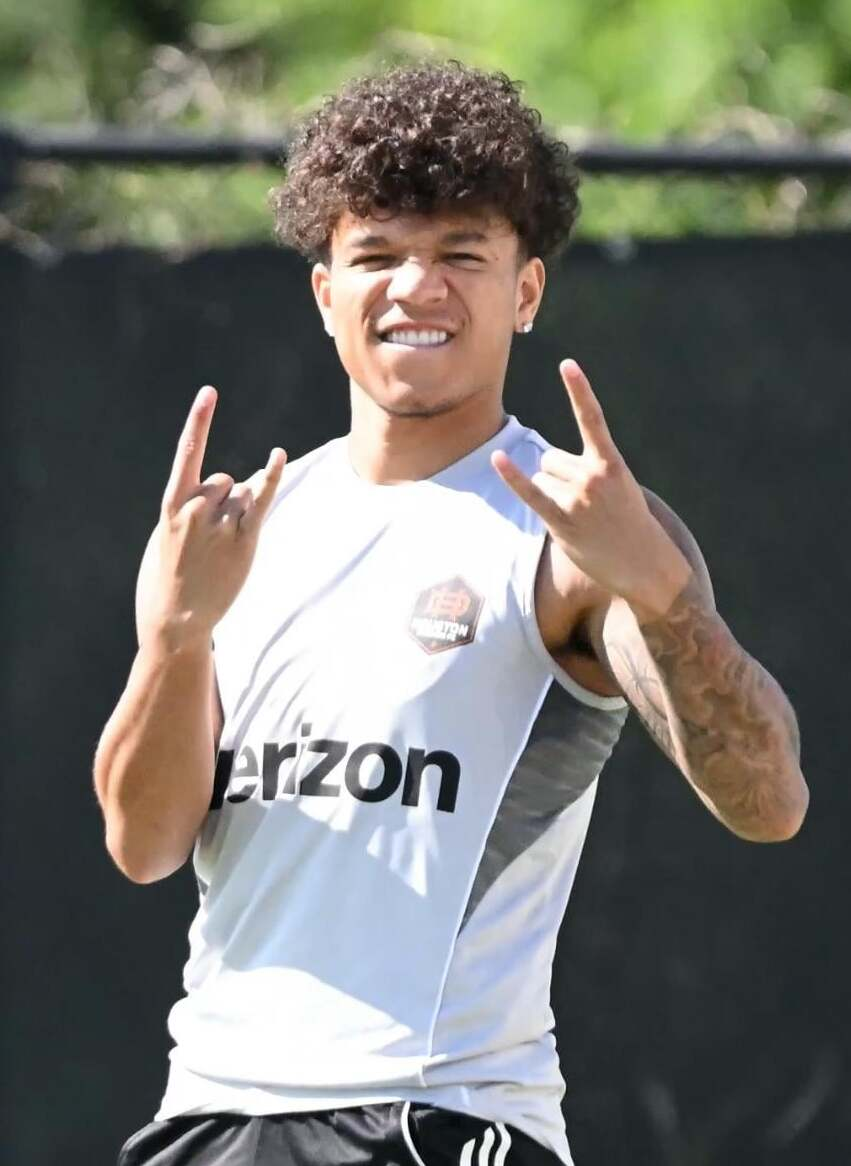
- Ennali in 2025

Personal information
- Date of birth: 7 March 2002 (age 24)
- Place of birth: Berlin, Germany
- Height: 1.72 m (5 ft 8 in)
- Position: Winger

Team information
- Current team: Houston Dynamo
- Number: 11

Youth career
- DJK Allersberg
- –2009: DJK Schwabach
- 2009–2013: 1. FC Nürnberg
- 2013–2016: Hertha BSC
- 2016: Tennis Borussia Berlin
- 2017–2019: Viktoria Berlin
- 2019–2020: Schalke 04
- 2020–2021: Hannover 96

Senior career*
Years	Team	Apps	(Gls)
2020–2023	Hannover 96 II	17	(6)
2021–2023	Hannover 96	8	(0)
2022–2023	→ Rot-Weiss Essen (loan)	34	(3)
2023–2024	Górnik Zabrze	26	(5)
2023	Górnik Zabrze II	1	(1)
2024–	Houston Dynamo	53	(5)
- * Club domestic league appearances and goals as of 2 November 2026

Lawrence Ennali (born 7 March 2002) is a German professional footballer who plays as a winger for Major League Soccer club Houston Dynamo.

== Career ==
Ennali made his professional debut for Hannover 96 in the 2. Bundesliga on 14 August 2021 against Dynamo Dresden, coming on in the 74th minute as a substitute for Hendrik Weydandt. The away match finished as a 2–0 loss for Hannover.

On 30 June 2023, Ennali joined Polish Ekstraklasa side Górnik Zabrze on a two-year deal with an extension option.

On 18 July 2024, Ennali joined American Major League Soccer side Houston Dynamo FC on a permanent move.

== Career statistics ==
As of match played 18 August 2025

Appearances and goals by club, season and competition
Club	Season	League			National cup (Note: Includes DFB-Pokal, Polish Cup)		Continental		Other		Total	
Club	Season	Division	Apps	Goals	Apps	Goals	Apps	Goals	Apps	Goals	Apps	Goals
Hannover II	2020–21	Regionalliga Nord	2	0	—		—		—		2	0
Hannover II	2021–22	Regionalliga Nord	15	6	—		—		—		15	6
Hannover II	Total		17	6	—		—		—		17	6
Hannover	2021–22	2. Bundesliga	8	0	2	0	—		—		10	0
Rot-Weiss Essen (loan)	2022–23	3. Liga	34	3	—		—		3 (Note: Appearances in Lower Rhine Cup)	1	37	4
Górnik Zabrze	2023–24	Ekstraklasa	26	5	3	2	—		—		29	7
Górnik Zabrze II	2023–24	III liga, group I	1	1	—		—		—		1	1
Houston Dynamo FC	2024	Major League Soccer	2	1	—		—		3 (Note: Appearances in Leagues Cup)	0	5	1
Houston Dynamo FC	2025	Major League Soccer	10	1	0	0	—		3	0	13	1
Houston Dynamo FC	Total		12	2	0	0	—		6	0	18	2
Career total			98	17	5	2	0	0	9	1	112	20

== Honours ==
Individual

- Ekstraklasa Player of the Month: April 2024
