= Femi Awodesu =

American soccer player (born 2001)

Personal information
- Full name: Obafemi Fela Awodesu
- Date of birth: 5 April 2001 (age 25)
- Place of birth: Philadelphia, Pennsylvania, United States
- Height: 1.90 m (6 ft 3 in)
- Position: Defender

Team information
- Current team: Helsingborgs IF
- Number: 2

Youth career
- –2017: Philadelphia Union
- 2018: FC DELCO
- 2019–2020: Chargers Soccer Club
- 2020: Tampa Bay Rowdies

College career
Years	Team	Apps	(Gls)
2020–2024	Penn States Nittany Lions	65	(6)

Senior career*
Years	Team	Apps	(Gls)
2024–2025	Houston Dynamo FC	24	(1)
2024–2025	→ Houston Dynamo 2 (loan)	30	(2)
2026–	Helsingborgs IF	21	(1)
- * Club domestic league appearances and goals as of November 12, 2026

Obafemi Fela Awodesu (born 5 April 2001) is an American professional soccer player who plays as a defender for Helsingborgs IF.

== Early life ==
Awodesu was born on 5 April 2001. Born in Philadelphia, Pennsylvania, United States, he is a native of the city. Of Nigerian descent through his father, he has been known for his TikTok account. Growing up, he attended Pennsylvania State University in the United States.

== Career ==
Awodesu started his career with American side Houston Dynamo FC ahead of the 2024 season, where he made twenty-four league appearances and scored one goal. Following his stint there, he signed for Swedish side Helsingborgs IF during January 2026, having previously trained there in the summer of 2023.
