= Gabriel Segal (soccer) =

American soccer player (born 2001)

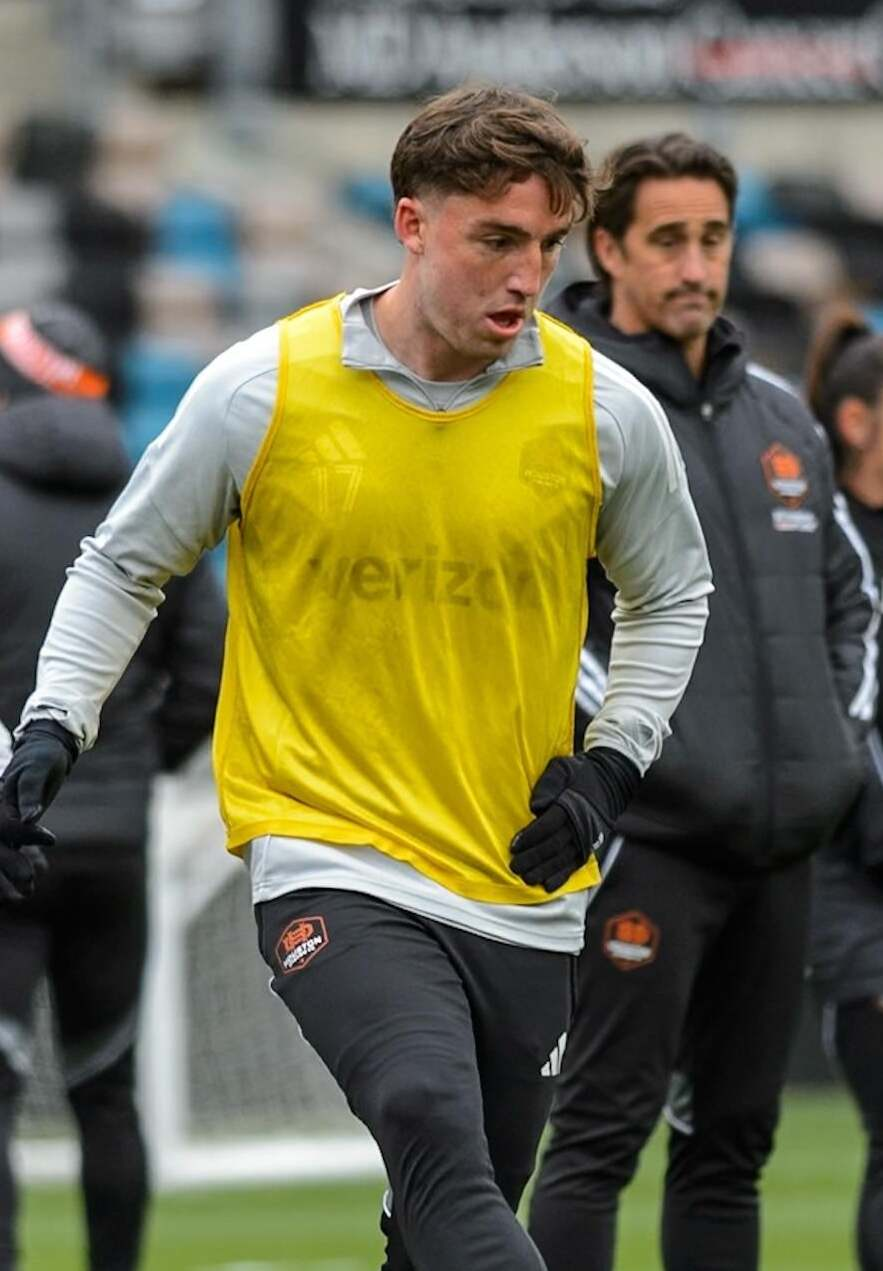
- Segal in 2025

Personal information
- Date of birth: May 17, 2001 (age 25)
- Place of birth: Washington, D.C., U.S.
- Height: 5 ft 10 in (1.78 m)
- Position: Forward

Team information
- Current team: D.C. United
- Number: 14

Youth career
- 2015–2019: Bethesda Soccer Club

College career
Years	Team	Apps	(Gls)
2019–2021	Stanford Cardinal	54	(14)

Senior career*
Years	Team	Apps	(Gls)
2019	Loudoun United	1	(0)
2022–2023	1. FC Köln II	12	(0)
2023	New York City	10	(2)
2023	→ New York City FC II (loan)	1	(1)
2023	→ Hapoel Tel Aviv (loan)	3	(0)
2024–2025	Houston Dynamo	24	(4)
2024–2025	→ Houston Dynamo 2 (loan)	11	(10)
2026–	D.C. United	0	(0)

International career
2016–2017	United States U16	7	(3)
2017	United States U17		
2018	United States U18	3	(2)
- * Club domestic league appearances and goals as of October 24, 2025

Gabriel Segal (born May 17, 2001) is an American professional soccer player who plays as a forward for D.C. United in Major League Soccer.

== Youth and college career ==
Segal played as a youth at Bethesda Soccer Club in his hometown of Bethesda, Maryland.

In 2019 Segal enrolled at Stanford University to play college soccer. At Stanford he made 54 appearances, scored 14 goals, and had 5 assists over three seasons with the Cardinal. Segal helped Stanford win the 2020–21 Pac-12 regular season championship. He was an All-Pac-12 2nd team selection during the 2020–21 season.

== Professional career ==
=== Loudoun United ===
On June 28, 2019, Segal made an appearance for Loudoun United of the USL Championship in a 2–1 win against Atlanta United 2.

=== Köln ===
In the summer of 2022 Segal moved to Germany and signed for 1. FC Köln. He signed a two-year contract with the club.

Playing for 1. FC Köln II in the Regionalliga West in the 2022–23 season he played 12 games, including six starts. He had his first goal involvement on October 1, 2022, in a 3–2 win against Wattenscheid.

=== New York City ===
On January 10, 2023, Segal signed with Major League Soccer club New York City FC. As a former collegiate player NYCFC had to claim Segal through waivers. He made his MLS and NYCFC debut on April 1, getting the start and playing 67 minutes in a 1–1 draw with the New England Revolution. Segal scored his first professional goal on May 17, finding the back of the net in the 89th minute to earn a 1–1 draw away against Orlando City SC. On June 17 he scored 4 minutes into stoppage time to rescue a point in 1–1 draw against the Columbus Crew. Segal finished the season with 2 goals in 13 appearances across all competitions as NYCFC finished 11th in the Eastern Conference, failing to qualify for the playoffs.

On September 4, 2023, he joined Hapoel Tel Aviv on a season-long loan. He made his debut for the club on September 18, coming on as a substitute in a scoreless draw with Hapoel Be'er Sheva. After making 3 appearances in Israel, both clubs agreed to terminate the loan on November 8 and Segal returned to New York.

=== Houston Dynamo ===
On February 16, 2024, Segal was traded to the Houston Dynamo for a third-round pick in the 2025 MLS SuperDraft, with NYCFC maintaining a sell-on fee. He made his Dynamo debut on February 21, coming off the bench in a 2–1 loss to St. Louis City in the CONCACAF Champions Cup. Segal scored on his league debut for Houston on February 24, a 1–1 draw with Sporting Kansas City. Houston declined his contract option following the 2025 season.

== International career ==
Segal has represented the United States at under-14 and under-16 levels. He was part of the under-18 side which were champions of the Václav Ježek Tournament held in Lázně Bělohrad, Czech Republic in August 2018.

== Career statistics ==
As of March 3, 2024

Club	Season	League			National cup (Note: Includes U.S. Open Cup, DFB-Pokal, and Israel State Cup)		League cup (Note: Includes USL Championship Playoffs, MLS Cup Playoffs, MLS Next Pro Playoffs, and Toto Cup)		Continental		Total	
Club	Season	Division	Apps	Goals	Apps	Goals	Apps	Goals	Apps	Goals	Apps	Goals
Loudoun United	2019	USL Championship	1	0	—		—		—		1	0
1. FC Köln II	2022–23	Regionalliga West	12	0	—		—		—		12	0
New York City FC	2023	MLS	10	2	1	0	—		2 (Note: Appearances in Leagues Cup)	0	13	2
New York City FC II (loan)	2023	MLS Next Pro	1	1	—		—		—		1	1
Hapoel Tel Aviv (loan)	2023–24	Israeli Premier League	3	0	0	0	0	0	—		3	0
Houston Dynamo	2024	MLS	2	1	0	0	0	0	2 (Note: Appearances in CONCACAF Champions Cup)	0	4	1
Career total			29	4	1	0	0	0	4	0	34	4
