= Houston Dynamo 2 =

American soccer club

- Full name: Houston Dynamo 2
- Nickname: Dynamo Dos
- Founded: December 6, 2021; 4 years ago
- Stadium: SaberCats Stadium
- Capacity: 4,000
- Head coach: Jeremy Hurdle
- League: MLS Next Pro
- 2025: 11th, Western Conference; Playoffs: Did not qualify
- Website: www.houstondynamofc.com/dynamo2/
Home colors	Away colors

Houston Dynamo 2 is an American professional soccer team that is located in Houston, Texas. It is the reserve team of Houston Dynamo FC and participates in MLS Next Pro.

== History ==
On December 6, 2021, Houston Dynamo FC were named as one of 21 clubs that would field a team in the new MLS Next Pro league beginning in the 2022 season.

== Players and staff ==
=== Current roster ===
As of July 16, 2026

No.	Pos.	Nation	Player
1	GK	BRA	Pedro Oliveira
4	DF	USA	Chibuike Ukaegbu
6	DF	USA	Gilberto Rivera
7	FW	USA	Austin Brummett
9	MF	BRA	Dohmann (on loan from Fluminense)
10	FW	BRA	Arthur Sousa (on loan from Red Bull Bragantino)
11	FW	JAM	Jahmani Bell
12	DF	BRA	Vinicius Silva (on loan from Ferroviária)
14	DF	USA	Noah Betancourt
16	FW	BRA	Alan (on loan from Comercial Futebol Clube (Tietê))
17	MF	USA	D’Alessandro Herrera
18	MF	USA	Diego Gonzalez
20	DF	USA	Gavin Wolff
23	DF	USA	Daniel Barrett
24	MF	USA	Mamadi Jiana
29	FW	USA	David Garcia
33	MF	USA	Mattheo Dimareli
37	MF	GUA	Omar Bolaños
38	DF	USA	Omar Flores
40	MF	USA	Enrique Correa
42	FW	USA	Myles Gardner
43	GK	USA	Roman Kerimov
44	MF	USA	Lionel Gitau
45	MF	USA	Faraji Ramani
49	DF	USA	Micah Harris
70	MF	ECU	Jordy Burbano
—	DF	ECU	Davis Bautista
—	DF	BRA	Gabriel William (on loan from Ituano FC)

Signed to first team contract with the Houston Dynamo FC.
Houston Dynamo FC academy player.

=== Staff ===
- Jeremy Hurdle – Head Coach
- Daniel Roberts – Assistant Coach
- Ryan Thompson – Goalkeeper Coach

== Team records ==
=== Season-by-season ===
As of November 2, 2025

Season	MLS Next Pro											Playoffs	Top Scorer	
Season	P	W	D	L	GF	GA	GD	Pts	PPG	Conf.	Overall	Playoffs	Player	Goals
2022	24	14	5	5	38	22	+16	49	2.04	3rd	4th	Conference Semifinals	(United States) Marcelo Palomino	7
2023	28	12	4	12	50	44	+6	43	1.54	7th	12th	Conference Quarterfinals	(Senegal) Papa Ndoye	14
2024	28	10	7	11	46	45	+1	39	1.39	8th	19th	Conference Quarterfinals	(United States) Gabriel Segal	10
2025	28	9	6	13	40	47	-7	37	1.32	11th	21st	DNQ	(Ghana) Stephen Annor Gyamfi	6
Overall	108	45	22	41	174	158	+16	168	1.59	-	-	-	(Senegal) Papa Ndoye	19

=== Head coaches record ===
As of August 8, 2026

- Includes Regular season & Playoffs

Manager	Nationality	From	To	G	W	D	L	GF	GA	PPG	Win%
Kenny Bundy	United States	January 28, 2022	January 13, 2025	80	36	16	28	134	111	1.66	45.00
Marcelo Santos	Brazil	January 24, 2025	Present	48	22	9	17	85	66	1.71	45.83

== See also ==
- MLS Next Pro
