= 1984 Coupe de France final =

- Event: 1983–84 Coupe de France
Metz	Monaco
2	0
- After extra time
- Date: 11 May 1984
- Venue: Parc des Princes, Paris
- Referee: Michel Vautrot
- Attendance: 45,384

The 1984 Coupe de France final was a football match held at Parc des Princes, Paris, on 11 May 1984 that saw FC Metz defeat AS Monaco FC 2–0 thanks to goals by Philippe Hinschberger and Tony Kurbos.

== Match details ==
11 May 1984

Metz	2–0 (a.e.t.)	Monaco
Hinschberger 102'; Kurbos 108'

Parc des Princes, Paris
Attendance: 45,384
Referee: Michel Vautrot

GK	(France) Michel Ettore
DF	(France) Philippe Thys	(substituted off) 36'
DF	(France) Robert Barraja
DF	(France) Alain Colombo
DF	(Argentina) Fernando Zappia
MF	(France) Vincent Bracigliano
MF	(France) Jean-Philippe Rohr	(substituted off) 66'
MF	(France) Jean-Paul Bernad (c)
FW	(France) Éric Pécout
FW	(Socialist Federal Republic of Yugoslavia) Tony Kurbos
FW	(France) Philippe Hinschberger
Substitutes:
DF	(France) Luc Sonor	(substituted in) 36'
FW	(France) Daniel Cangini	(substituted in) 66'
Manager:
(Poland) Henryk Kasperczak

GK	(France) Jean-Luc Ettori (c)
DF	(France) Claude Puel
DF	(France) Manuel Amoros
DF	(France) Yvon Le Roux
DF	(Argentina) Juan Simon
MF	(France) Dominique Bijotat
MF	(France) Patrick Delamontagne
MF	(France) Daniel Bravo
MF	(France) Bernard Genghini
FW	(West Germany) Uwe Krause
FW	(France) Bruno Bellone
Substitutes:
Manager:
(France) Lucien Muller

== See also ==
- 1983–84 Coupe de France
