= Philippe Mahut =

French footballer (1956–2014)

Personal information
- Full name: Philippe Georges Léon Mahut
- Date of birth: 4 March 1956
- Place of birth: Lunery, France
- Date of death: 8 February 2014 (aged 57)
- Place of death: Paris, France
- Height: 1.79 m (5 ft 10 in)
- Position: Defender

Senior career*
Years	Team	Apps	(Gls)
1974–1976	Entente BFN	45	(0)
1976–1978	Troyes	54	(0)
1978–1982	Metz	135	(2)
1982–1984	Saint-Étienne	65	(2)
1984–1988	Matra Racing (Note: In 1987, RC Paris renamed to Matra Racing.)	131	(12)
1988–1989	Quimper	48	(3)
1989–1993	Le Havre	118	(7)
Total		596	(26)

International career
1981–1983	France	9	(0)
- * Club domestic league appearances and goals

Philippe Georges Léon Mahut (French pronunciation: [fi.lip ma.y]; 4 March 1956 – 8 February 2014) was a French professional footballer who played as a defender.

From 1974 to 1993, Mahut played for seven football clubs – all of them in his native France – and scored 30 goals in 654 competitive club matches. He earned nine international caps for the France national team during the early 1980s.

Mahut was described as a "sturdy defender" with "a heading ability above average".

== Early life ==
Philippe Mahut was born in the hamlet of Rosières, which is a part of the commune of Lunery, in the department of Cher. His family had Polish ancestry. He grew up in that hamlet, raised by his grandmother. Philippe's father was an amateur football player and was very good at it, hence Philippe's talent for playing football. Philippe Mahut started his youth football career at AS Montferrandaise when he was nine years old. He subsequently settled in Fontainebleau, where he was raised by his uncle and aunt. Philippe Mahut did his compulsory military service in the south of Seine-et-Marne department.

== Club career ==
=== Entente BFN ===
Mahut, who had settled in Fontainebleau during his childhood, joined the youth team of that town's local club, Entente BFN. It was in Division 2 from 1970 to 1978. While he was a player of the club, he prepared for but failed his baccalauréat. Thanks to Mahut's fine performances in the youth team, he was included in the senior team at the dawn of the 1974–1975 season by Ladislas Nagy, the head coach of the senior team. In each of Mahut's two seasons (he played 21 and 24 league matches in the 1974–1975 and 1975–1976 seasons respectively) with the club as a senior player, it finished the league season (Group A of Division 2) just one point above the highest-ranked of the bottom three clubs that were to be relegated. Thanks to his good footballing qualities and his fine performances in the Division 2 matches, he rapidly attracted the attention of player scouts. He received several offers to join Division 1 clubs such as Troyes and Paris Saint-Germain. André Watrin, who was then sporting director of Troyes and was also working as a player scout for Troyes, convinced Mahut to join the club. Mahut would explain later that he preferred to play for a modest club like Troyes because he did not have enough self-confidence to stand out at a bigger club like Paris Saint-Germain.

=== Troyes ===
In July 1976, Mahut joined Troyes (whose head coach was then René Cédolin), initially signing a contract as a semi-professional. On 24 September 1976, he made his Division 1 debut at the Stade de l'Aube against Angers. Mahut played 28 league matches in his first season at Troyes, and the club finished the 1976–77 French Division 1 season in 15th position. After having signed a contract as a full-fledged professional for the first time in his football career, he played 26 leagues matches in his second and final season at Troyes, at the end of which they were relegated to Division 2. While Mahut was a player of the club, he was called up to the France national under-21 football team.

=== Metz ===
Not wanting to play in Division 2 in the 1978–79 season, Mahut decided to leave Troyes and join Metz, which had offered him a contract. Metz was planning to assemble a team that was capable of finishing above mid-table in Division 1. He was to play for the club for four years (1978–1982). It was at Metz where he played the greatest number of matches – 152 in all competitions – in his nineteen-year, senior club career. He was promoted to club captain there when he was 25 years old. He scored the first league (Division 1 or Division 2) goal of his senior club career in his final season at Metz.

Metz, who had appointed Marc Rastoll - one of their former players - as their head coach at the start of the 1978–1979 season, won their first four league matches of the 1978–79 French Division 1 season. It managed to remain in the top positions of the Division 1 table throughout the entire season. It eventually finished 5th in the Division 1 table and one position below Monaco (because it had a better goal difference than Metz), which thus clinched the second of France's two 1979–80 UEFA Cup spots at Metz's expense. In his first season at the club, Mahut integrated well into the team, formed a centre-back partnership with Wim Suurbier and made 32 league appearances.

In contrast to the 1978–79 season, Metz struggled to stay above the relegation zone throughout the 1979–80 French Division 1 season. It narrowly avoided relegation by finishing 17th in the league standings. In his second season at the club, Mahut played in 32 league matches and formed a centre-back partnership with Ángel Bargas, following Wim Suurbier's departure before the start of the 1979–80 season.

During the summer of 1980, the club saw the departures of several key players, including Patrick Battiston and Philippe Redon. Metz finished the 1980–81 French Division 1 season in 9th position, during which Mahut played in 37 leagues matches (he did not play in only one of the club's 38 league matches in that season). He also mentored the club's younger players such as Alain Colombo, Jean-Philippe Rohr and Luc Sonor.

Metz's 1981–82 season was weakened by the departures of Souto, Wiss, Desrousseaux, Riedl, Polaniok and Bargas. They were replaced by players of lower quality and this led to the club struggling in the 1981–82 French Division 1 campaign and having to wait until the last round of league matches to find out if it would be in Division 1 the following season. It eventually finished 17th in the 1981-82 Division 1 table and narrowly avoided relegation. In his final season at Metz, Mahut was partnered with the newly recruited Branko Tucak, his third and final centre-back partner at the club. Mahut scored two goals in 34 league matches for his club that season, and those were the first league (Division 1 or Division 2) goals of his senior club career.

=== Saint-Étienne ===
In the summer of 1982, Mahut received an offer he could not refuse - an offer to join Saint-Étienne, a club that he adored. He soon left Metz for Saint-Étienne for a transfer fee of two million francs, an enormous sum at that time for a defender. He played his first competitive match for Saint-Étienne on 10 August 1982, which was the club's first Division 1 match of the season, against SC Bastia. He played 76 matches and scored 2 goals in all competitions in his two seasons there. He scored both of these goals in Division 1 matches, against Nancy (1982–1983 season) and Rennes (1983–1984 season).

When Mahut joined Saint-Étienne in the summer of 1982, the club was embroiled in a financial scandal involving a controversial slush fund which would have a negative impact on the match performance of the club over the next two seasons. The club experienced a difficult 1982–83 French Division 1 season, during which their head coach for the past 11 years, Robert Herbin, was sacked (in February 1983) and replaced by Guy Briet. Saint-Étienne finished the 1982–83 Division 1 season in 14th position, only 3 points more than the highest-ranked (18th position) of the bottom three clubs that was to contest the Division 1/2 promotion/relegation, two-legged playoff. In the 1982–1983 season, Mahut played in a UEFA club competition - the 1982–83 UEFA Cup - for the only time in his career. In that competition, Saint-Étienne was eliminated 4–0 on aggregate by Bohemians CKD Praha in the second round and Mahut played all the 4 matches the club was involved in but he did not score any goals.

The summer of 1983 really marked the end of the club's golden era, with the departure of good players like Patrick Battiston, Bernard Genghini and Gérard Janvion, etc. They were replaced by players of lower quality and hence the squad was severely weakened for the 1983–84 season. Mahut and his teammates experienced another difficult season, and the club finished the 1983–84 French Division 1 season in 18th position. Saint-Étienne lost the following Division 1/2 promotion/relegation, two-legged playoff to Racing Club de Paris 2–0 on aggregate and were relegated to Division 2. Saint-Étienne had been in Division 1 every year since 1963.

=== RC Paris/Matra Racing ===
From 1984 to 1988, Mahut played for RC Paris/Matra Racing, during which he scored 12 goals in 131 leagues matches and 1 goal in 16 domestic cup matches. They won the Division 2 title at the end of the 1985–1986 season and won promotion to Division 1 for the 1986–1987 season.

RC Paris had bad match results during the first half of the 1984–85 French Division 1 season, which cost head coach Alain de Martigny his job in January 1985. He was replaced by Victor Zvunka. The club finished rock bottom of the Division 1 table and was relegated to Division 2, just one year after winning promotion to Division 1.

Despite its relegation to Division 2, the owner and president of the club, Jean-Luc Lagardère, got the club to undergo a major recruitment exercise by signing several new and reputable players for the 1985–86 season, including Maxime Bossis. It also appointed a new head coach, Silvester Takač for that new season. Mahut and his teammates helped the club to win Group B of the 1985–86 Division 2 by a six-point margin. The club later won the 1985–86 French Division 2 title by beating Saint-Étienne 4–3 on aggregate in the two-legged playoff between the winners of Group A and Group B of the 1985–86 Division 2. Mahut, who was a key member of the club's defence, surprised many by scoring 10 goals in 31 league matches and 1 goal in 6 domestic cup matches during the 1985–86 season which was by far his best ever goal haul in competitive matches in a single season in his senior club career. Racing Club de Paris enjoyed a good run in the 1985–86 Coupe de France, where it lost in the quarter-finals for the second season in a row.

In order to perform well in the 1986–87 French Division 1 season, Racing Club de Paris broke the bank by signing high-quality, foreign and French internationals (Bernard Bureau, Luis Fernandez, Enzo Francescoli, Bruno Germain, Pierre Littbarski, Pascal Olmeta, Rubén Paz and Thierry Tusseau) as well as good, non-international players from France (Loïc Pérard and Jean-Luc Le Magueresse) in the middle of 1986. Despite the heavy investments in these star players, the club did not meet its own high expectations - it only finished in 13th position in the 1986–87 Division 1 table. During that season, Mahut played in 37 out of 38 league matches, but failed to score a single goal in any of them.

The club changed its name to Matra Racing in 1987. Jean-Luc Lagardère was aiming for his club to qualify for one of the three UEFA competitions. In the summer of 1987, the club hired a new head coach, Artur Jorge, who had just guided Porto to victory in the 1987 European Cup Final. Four new players - Gérard Buscher, Merry Krimau, Thierry Fernier and Sonny Silooy - were signed for the 1987–1988 season. Matra Racing was in the top three positions of the 1987–88 French Division 1 table in the mid-season, but a run of 12 league matches without a single win resulted in it finishing in 7th position in the 1987–88 Division 1 table and missing qualification for the 1988–89 UEFA Cup. In his fourth and final season with the club, Mahut played 31 league matches and scored 2 league goals.

=== Quimper ===
Mahut had practically decided to retire from playing football in the summer of 1988. But when he was approached by the management of the Division 2 club Quimper, he changed his mind for he was very tempted by the challenge of trying to help Stade Quimpérois win promotion to Division 1. Moreover, the club already had or would have on its payroll players who were former football club colleagues of Mahut, such as Michel Ettore, José Souto and Eugène Ekéké. Mahut played 48 league matches (all of them Division 2) and scored 3 league goals for Stade Quimpérois in his one and a half seasons there from 1988 to 1989.

Stade Quimpérois finished in fourth position in Group A of the 1988–89 French Division 2, which was its best ever finish in Division 2. It was thus beaten to the Division 1 promotion play-offs by Rennes, which finished Group A in third position level on points with Stade Quimpérois but with a superior goal difference. In his first season with the club, Mahut played 33 out of 34 league matches and scored one league goal.

The 1989–90 season would prove to be a difficult one for the players of Stade Quimpérois because the club was experiencing major financial problems. These financial problems not only thwarted the club management's dreams of promotion to Division 1 but also forced the club to sell some of its players, including Mahut, between October and November 1989. During the first half of the 1989–90 Division 2 season, Jean-Pierre Hureau, who was then the president of Le Havre, traveled to Quimper to talk Mahut into joining his club.

=== Le Havre ===
In October 1989, Mahut signed a two-year contract to join Le Havre (which was then in Division 2), where he became the club captain. During his almost four years there, he extended his contract twice and scored 7 goals in 118 leagues matches and 2 goals in 7 domestic cup matches. Le Havre won the 1990–91 French Division 2 title. On 29 May 1993, he played the last match of his professional football career – a Division 1 match (his 422nd and last Division 1 match) against AJ Auxerre at Stade Jules Deschaseaux, Le Havre's home stadium.

In his first season with Le Havre, Mahut played 18 league matches and scored 1 league goal. The club finished in 5th position and had the second-best defense in Group B of the 1989–90 French Division 2.

In his second season with Le Havre, Mahut became the club captain, played 32 league matches and scored 4 league goals. The club finished in 1st position in Group B of the 1990–91 French Division 2, 5 points ahead of second-placed Lens. It defeated the Group A winner Nîmes 3–0 on aggregate in the Division 2 title play-off match to win the 1990-1991 Division 2 title.

After having fulfilled his dream of returning to Division 1, Mahut contemplated retirement from playing football. His legs were starting to tire during matches and he was no longer playing at one hundred percent. But on thinking it over, he decided to continue playing as he felt that he could still do a service for the club. Several new players - Graham Rix, Václav Daněk, Thierry Goudet, Pierre Aubame, Patrice Garande, Jean-Christophe Thouvenel and Teddy Bertin - were signed for the 1991–1992 season. Le Havre finished in a surprising 7th position in the 1991–92 French Division 1 season (during which Mahut played in all 38 league matches and scored 1 league goal) and missed qualification for the 1992–93 UEFA Cup by a mere two points.

The departures of Danek, Garande and Rix weakened the squad of the club for the 1992–1993 season. However, it managed to keep its Division 1 status by finishing in 15th position in the 1992–93 French Division 1. In the last season of his senior club career, Mahut played 30 league matches and scored 1 league goal.

=== Retirement ===
When Mahut finally hang up his football boots in 1993, he had played in 13 Division 1 and 6 Division 2 seasons, scoring 8 goals in 422 Division 1 matches and 18 goals in 174 Division 2 matches as a senior player. During those 19 Division 1/Division 2 seasons, he scored 4 goals in 54 domestic cup matches and played 4 UEFA club competition matches.

== International career ==
Between 1981 and 1983, Mahut earned a total of 9 international caps for the France national football team, scoring no goals.

Mahut made his debut for France on 9 September 1981, in a 1982 World Cup qualifying match against Belgium at the Heysel Stadium in Brussels. He also played for his country in a 1982 World Cup qualifying match against the Republic of Ireland on 14 October 1981. He was part of the France squad at the 1982 World Cup finals held in Spain. In that tournament, he only played in one match – the third-place match against Poland in Alicante. That match was his third and last appearance in a competitive match for France.

His final international appearance for his country was on 23 March 1983 in a friendly match against the Soviet Union at the Parc des Princes stadium.

== Career in his later years ==
After he retired as a football player, Mahut resettled in Fontainebleau. Beginning in early 1994, Mahut worked as an insurance agent in Moret-sur-Loing, which is about 10 km from Fontainebleau. He later became the manager of a Mutuelles du Mans Assurances (MMA) insurance agency in Moret-sur-Loing.

Besides the insurance business, Mahut was also active in local politics and sports administration. He was elected to the Fontainebleau town council. He assisted its mayor in sports-related affairs for almost a decade, starting from 2005. He was a member of the French Football Federation's National Ethics Council for four years, starting from 2010. Starting from 2012, he was a vice president of the Communauté de communes du Pays de Fontainebleau in charge of sports. From 1995 to 1998, Mahut was the president of Racing Club de Fontainebleau, the first club that he played for in his senior football career. He also served as the honorary president of that club right until his death. Mahut oversaw the initial stages of the 2013-2016 stade de la Faisanderie (Racing Club de Fontainebleau's home stadium) renovation project. In that project, the demolition of the old spectator stands were completed in December 2013 and the renovation works were scheduled to finish three years later.

== Personal life ==
Mahut married Corinne, who was from Fontainebleau, in 1979. They had two sons, David and Mickey.

== Tributes ==
"He (Mahut) will be remembered as a great professional on and off the pitch," said French Football Federation president Noël Le Graët. Le Graët also hailed Mahut as an "exemplary" and "talented" player who "unfortunately had gone far too soon".

== Death and funeral ==
Mahut died in a Paris clinic in the early hours of 8 February 2014 after a long battle against cancer. He was survived by his wife, Corinne, their two sons (David and Mickey) and grandchildren.

Mahut's funeral took place at the Roman Catholic Church of Saint Louis in Fontainebleau at 1030am on 13 February 2014. The funeral was attended by 800 persons that comprised his family, friends, members of the Fontainebleau town council (including Frédéric Valletoux, the town's mayor) and dozens of his former football teammates such as Patrick Battiston, Maxime Bossis, Luis Fernandez, Yannick Stopyra and Luc Sonor. He was later buried at that town's cemetery.
