= Derby Lorrain =

Football match contested between French clubs Metz and Nancy

- Location: Lorraine (historical); Grand Est (current)
- Teams: Metz; Nancy
- First meeting: Nancy 1–1 Metz (3 October 1970); 1970–71 French Division 1
- Latest meeting: Nancy 1–0 Metz (10 May 2019); 2018–19 Ligue 2
- Stadiums: Stade Saint-Symphorien (Metz); Stade Marcel Picot (Nancy)

Statistics
- Total meetings: 57
- Most wins: Metz (24)
- Most player appearances: Francisco Rubio; Philippe Hinschberger; Jean-Michel Moutier (18 each)
- Top scorer: Nico Braun (8)

The Derby Lorrain or Derby de la Lorraine is a football match contested between French clubs Metz and Nancy. The name of the derby derives from the fact that Metz and Nancy are the two major clubs located in the former region of Lorraine (now Grand Est).

Metz play at the Stade Saint-Symphorien in Longeville-lès-Metz, near Metz, while Nancy play at the Stade Marcel Picot in Tomblaine, near Nancy; the two grounds are separated by approximately 34 miles (55 km). The teams have played 57 matches in all competitions; Metz winning 24, Nancy winning 16, and the remaining 17 have been drawn. They have won a combined 15 honours; 8 for Metz and 7 for Nancy.

== History ==
The roots of the rivalry are the social reasons, with Metz being an industrial city while Nancy a more cultural city. The first meeting between two teams occurred on 3 October 1970, when Nancy hosted Metz to a 1–1 draw. The first win in a derby came on 28 August 1971, as Nancy won 1–0 away at Metz. Since then a total of 57 competitive matches have been played between both sides, 56 of which were in the league and 1 was Coupe de France match.

== Head-to-head ==
The derby has been contested the most in top division, with 48 matches played in French Division 1/Ligue 1, Metz won 18 matches, Nancy 15 and remaining 15 were drawn, in Ligue 2, Metz won 5, Nancy won 1 and 2 were drawn, while the only derby in a cup game was in Coupe de France, which was won by Metz.

=== Statistics ===
Competition	Played	Metz wins	Draws	Nancy wins	Metz goals	Nancy goals
Ligue 1	48	18	15	15	67	57
Ligue 2	8	5	2	1	15	4
Coupe de France	1	1	0	0	1	0
Total	57	24	17	16	83	61

=== List of matches ===
League

#	Season	Date	Competition	Stadium	Home Team	Result	Away Team	Attendance	H2H
1	1970–71	3 October 1970	French Division 1	Stade Marcel Picot	Nancy	1–1	Metz	16,956	0
2	1970–71	3 April 1971	French Division 1	Stade Saint-Symphorien	Metz	1–1	Nancy	15,484	0
3	1971–72	28 August 1971	French Division 1	Stade Saint-Symphorien	Metz	0–1	Nancy	20,067	+1
4	1971–72	30 January 1972	French Division 1	Stade Marcel Picot	Nancy	1–1	Metz	12,741	+1
5	1972–73	4 October 1972	French Division 1	Stade Marcel Picot	Nancy	0–2	Metz	13,357	0
6	1972–73	24 March 1973	French Division 1	Stade Saint-Symphorien	Metz	1–0	Nancy	14,405	+1
7	1973–74	25 September 1973	French Division 1	Stade Saint-Symphorien	Metz	3–3	Nancy	11,293	+1
8	1973–74	24 February 1974	French Division 1	Stade Marcel Picot	Nancy	2–1	Metz	12,129	0
9	1975–76	4 October 1975	French Division 1	Stade Marcel Picot	Nancy	0–0	Metz	16,282	0
10	1975–76	16 March 1976	French Division 1	Stade Saint-Symphorien	Metz	4–1	Nancy	19,766	+1
11	1976–77	2 October 1976	French Division 1	Stade Marcel Picot	Nancy	4–1	Metz	22,136	0
12	1976–77	5 March 1977	French Division 1	Stade Saint-Symphorien	Metz	3–0	Nancy	21,344	+1
13	1977–78	23 September 1977	French Division 1	Stade Saint-Symphorien	Metz	3–0	Nancy	20,839	+2
14	1977–78	11 April 1978	French Division 1	Stade Marcel Picot	Nancy	0–0	Metz	10,000	+2
15	1978–79	25 August 1978	French Division 1	Stade Marcel Picot	Nancy	1–1	Metz	20,534	+2
16	1978–79	24 April 1979	French Division 1	Stade Saint-Symphorien	Metz	3–1	Nancy	12,710	+3
17	1979–80	10 August 1979	French Division 1	Stade Saint-Symphorien	Metz	2–1	Nancy	16,818	+4
18	1979–80	11 April 1980	French Division 1	Stade Marcel Picot	Nancy	0–1	Metz	7,000	+5
19	1980–81	5 August 1980	French Division 1	Stade Marcel Picot	Nancy	2–0	Metz	10,266	+4
20	1980–81	6 December 1980	French Division 1	Stade Saint-Symphorien	Metz	2–0	Nancy	6,729	+5
21	1981–82	12 September 1981	French Division 1	Stade Saint-Symphorien	Metz	1–2	Nancy	11,430	+4
22	1981–82	20 February 1982	French Division 1	Stade Marcel Picot	Nancy	2–2	Metz	8,543	+4
23	1982–83	2 October 1982	French Division 1	Stade Saint-Symphorien	Metz	2–3	Nancy	15,082	+3
24	1982–83	9 March 1983	French Division 1	Stade Marcel Picot	Nancy	4–0	Metz	7,560	+2
25	1983–84	1 October 1983	French Division 1	Stade Marcel Picot	Nancy	2–1	Metz	10,576	+1
26	1983–84	10 March 1984	French Division 1	Stade Saint-Symphorien	Metz	1–2	Nancy	9,012	0
27	1984–85	7 September 1984	French Division 1	Stade Marcel Picot	Nancy	2–1	Metz	11,548	+1
28	1984–85	3 February 1985	French Division 1	Stade Saint-Symphorien	Metz	2–2	Nancy	17,000	+1
29	1985–86	2 November 1985	French Division 1	Stade Saint-Symphorien	Metz	3–1	Nancy	17,678	0
30	1985–86	11 April 1986	French Division 1	Stade Marcel Picot	Nancy	0–2	Metz	10,398	+1
31	1986–87	13 September 1986	French Division 1	Stade Marcel Picot	Nancy	0–0	Metz	13,846	+1
32	1986–87	14 March 1987	French Division 1	Stade Saint-Symphorien	Metz	2–0	Nancy	11,791	+2
33	1990–91	6 October 1990	French Division 1	Stade Saint-Symphorien	Metz	4–0	Nancy	23,673	+3
34	1990–91	15 March 1991	French Division 1	Stade Marcel Picot	Nancy	0–1	Metz	10,579	+4
35	1991–92	10 August 1991	French Division 1	Stade Marcel Picot	Nancy	1–2	Metz	17,310	+5
36	1991–92	3 March 1992	French Division 1	Stade Saint-Symphorien	Metz	0–1	Nancy	11,491	+4
37	1996–97	6 September 1996	French Division 1	Stade Saint-Symphorien	Metz	1–0	Nancy	23,846	+5
38	1996–97	15 March 1991	French Division 1	Stade Marcel Picot	Nancy	2–3	Metz	14,658	+6
39	1998–99	4 October 1998	French Division 1	Stade Saint-Symphorien	Metz	2–3	Nancy	21,307	+5
40	1998–99	9 April 1999	French Division 1	Stade Marcel Picot	Nancy	1–0	Metz	15,667	+4
41	1999–2000	13 October 1999	French Division 1	Stade Saint-Symphorien	Metz	2–2	Nancy	24,402	+4
42	1999–2000	16 February 2000	French Division 1	Stade Marcel Picot	Nancy	0–0	Metz	13,219	+4
43	2002–03	3 November 2002	Ligue 2	Stade Marcel Picot	Nancy	1–2	Metz	12,969	+5
44	2002–03	4 April 2003	Ligue 2	Stade Saint-Symphorien	Metz	4–0	Nancy	21,081	+6
45	2005–06	17 September 2005	Ligue 1	Stade Marcel Picot	Nancy	1–1	Metz	20,052	+6
46	2005–06	7 March 2006	Ligue 1	Stade Saint-Symphorien	Metz	0–0	Nancy	18,324	+6
47	2007–08	27 October 2007	Ligue 1	Stade Saint-Symphorien	Metz	0–0	Nancy	19,585	+6
48	2007–08	22 March 2008	Ligue 1	Stade Marcel Picot	Nancy	2–1	Metz	18,768	+5
49	2013–14	24 September 2013	Ligue 2	Stade Saint-Symphorien	Metz	3–0	Nancy	23,506	+6
50	2013–14	1 March 2014	Ligue 2	Stade Marcel Picot	Nancy	0–1	Metz	19,028	+7
51	2015–16	18 September 2015	Ligue 2	Stade Saint-Symphorien	Metz	0–0	Nancy	24,071	+7
52	2015–16	5 February 2016	Ligue 2	Stade Marcel Picot	Nancy	2–2	Metz	19,152	+7
53	2016–17	30 November 2016	Ligue 1	Stade Marcel Picot	Nancy	4–0	Metz	19,085	+6
54	2016–17	29 April 2017	Ligue 1	Stade Saint-Symphorien	Metz	2–1	Nancy	20,009	+7
55	2018–19	29 January 2019	Ligue 2	Stade Saint-Symphorien	Metz	3–0	Nancy	18,274	+8
56	2018–19	10 May 2019	Ligue 2	Stade Marcel Picot	Nancy	1–0	Metz	16,094	+7

Cup

#	Season	Date	Competition	Stadium	Home Team	Result	Away Team	Attendance	Round
1	2002–03	3 October 1970	Coupe de France	Stade Marcel Picot	Nancy	0–1	Metz	9,419	Round of 32

== Records ==
=== All-time top goalscorers ===
Rank	Nation	Player	Club(s)	Years	League	Coupe de France	Overall
1	(Luxembourg)	Nico Braun	Metz	1973–1978	8	0	8
2	(France)	Francisco Rubio	Nancy	1975–1983	6	0	6
3	(France)	Bernard Zénier	Metz	1974–1978, 1986–1991	1	0	5
3	(France)	Bernard Zénier	Nancy	1978–1983	4	0	5
4	(France)	Philippe Hinschberger	Metz	1977–1992	4	0	4
4	(France)	Thierry Meyer	Nancy	1982–1984	4	0	4
6	(France)	Claude Hausknecht	Metz	1964–1967, 1970–1977	3	0	3
6	(France)	Marco Morgante	Metz	1980–1985	2	0	3
6	(France)	Marco Morgante	Nancy	1989–1993	1	0	3
6	(Argentina)	Hugo Curioni	Metz	1975–1977	3	0	3
6	(Senegal)	Jules Bocandé	Metz	1984–1986	3	0	3

=== All-time most appearances ===
Rank	Nation	Player	Club(s)	Years	League	Coupe de France	Overall
1	(France)	Francisco Rubio	Nancy	1975–1983	16	0	16
1	(France)	Philippe Hinschberger	Metz	1977–1992	16	0	16
1	(France)	Jean-Michel Moutier	Nancy	1975–1984	16	0	16
4	(France)	Bernard Zénier	Metz	1974–1978, 1986–1991	8	0	14
4	(France)	Bernard Zénier	Nancy	1978–1983	6	0	14
4	(France)	Vincent Bracigliano	Metz	1976–1985	14	0	14
4	(France)	Michel Ettore	Metz	1973–1988	14	0	14
8	(France)	Éric Martin	Nancy	1979–1986, 1989–1992	13	0	13
8	(Argentina)	Fernando Zappia	Nancy	1980–1983, 1989–1990	5	0	13
8	(Argentina)	Fernando Zappia	Metz	1983–1987	8	0	13

=== Hat-tricks ===
Nation	Player	For	Against	Score	Competition	Date	Ref.
(France)	Francisco Rubio	Nancy	Metz	4–1 (H)	1976–77 French Division 1	2 October 1976	

=== Discipline ===
Rank	Nation	Player	Red card(s)	For	Against	Competition	Date
1	(France)	Benjamin Nicaise	2	Nancy	Metz	1998–99 French Division 1	8 April 1999
1	(France)	Benjamin Nicaise	2	Nancy	Metz	1999–2000 French Division 1	15 February 2000
2	(France)	Benjamin Nicaise	1	Nancy	Metz	2002–03 Ligue 2	4 April 2003
2	(Cambodia)	Benoît Assou-Ekotto	1	Metz	Nancy	2016–17 Ligue 1	30 November 2016
2	(Haiti)	Jeff Louis	1	Nancy	Metz	2013–14 Ligue 2	1 March 2014
2	(France)	Malaly Dembélé	1	Nancy	Metz	2018–19 Ligue 2	29 January 2019
2	(Morocco)	Michaël Chrétien	1	Nancy	Metz	2007–08 Ligue 1	22 March 2008

=== Results ===
==== Biggest wins (4+ goals) ====
Winning margin	Result	Date	Competition
4	Nancy 4–0 Metz	9 March 1983	1982–83 French Division 1
4	Metz 4–0 Nancy	6 October 1990	1990–91 French Division 1
4	Metz 4–0 Nancy	4 April 2003	2002–03 Ligue 2
4	Nancy 4–0 Metz	30 November 2016	2016–17 Ligue 1

==== Most total goals in a match ====
Goals	Result	Date	Competition
6	Metz 3–3 Nancy	25 September 1973	1973–74 French Division 1
5	Metz 4–1 Nancy	16 March 1976	1975–76 French Division 1
5	Nancy 4–1 Metz	2 October 1976	1976–77 French Division 1
5	Metz 2–3 Nancy	2 October 1982	1982–83 French Division 1
5	Nancy 2–3 Metz	15 March 1991	1990–91 French Division 1

==== Longest runs ====
===== Most consecutive wins =====
Games	Club	Period
5	Nancy	2 October 1982 – 7 September 1984
4	Metz	14 March 1987 – 10 August 1991
3	Metz	24 April 1979 – 11 April 1980

===== Most consecutive draws =====
Games	Period
3	17 September 2005 – 27 October 2007

===== Most consecutive matches without a draw =====
Games	Period
9	14 March 1987 – 9 April 1999
6	24 April 1979 – 12 September 1981
5	2 October 1982 – 7 September 1984

===== Longest undefeated runs =====
Games	Club	Period
8	Nancy	12 September 1981 – 3 February 1985
7	Metz	5 March 1977 – 11 April 1980
7	Metz	2 November 1985 – 10 August 1991
5	Metz	3 November 2002 – 27 October 2007

===== Most consecutive matches without conceding a goal =====
Games	Club	Period
5	Metz	11 April 1986 – 15 March 1991
3	Metz	5 March 1977 – 11 April 1978
3	Metz	24 September 2013 – 18 September 2015

===== Most consecutive games scoring =====
Games	Club	Period
9	Nancy	12 September 1981 – 2 November 1985
6	Metz	1 October 1983 – 11 April 1986
5	Metz	3 January 1972 – 2 February 1974

=== Honours ===
Metz	Competition	Nancy
4	Ligue 2	5
2	Coupe de France	1
2	Coupe de la Ligue	1
8	Total	7
