= 2023 Houston Dynamo FC season =

Houston Dynamo
2023 season
- Owner: Ted Segal
- General manager: Pat Onstad
- Head coach: Ben Olsen
- Stadium: Shell Energy Stadium
- MLS: Conference: 4th Overall: 9th
- MLS Cup playoffs: Conference Finals
- U.S. Open Cup: Winners
- Leagues Cup: Round of 16
- Top goalscorer: League: Amine Bassi (10 goals); All: Amine Bassi (15 goals)
- Highest home attendance: 20,319 (11/26 v. SKC
- Lowest home attendance: All: 2,947 (5/23 v. MIN, USOC); League: 10,873 (8/30 v. CLB)
- Average home league attendance: 15,029
- Biggest win: HOU 5–0 POR (8/20)
- Biggest defeat: VAN 6–2 HOU (5/31)
Home colors	Away colors

The 2023 Houston Dynamo season was the 18th season of the team's existence since joining Major League Soccer (MLS) prior to the 2006 season. The Dynamo missed the playoffs in 2022 for the eighth time in nine years.

2023 was the first season under head coach Ben Olsen, who was hired on November 8, 2022. It was the second season under GM Pat Onstad and technical director Asher Mendelsohn. It was the third season (second full season) under majority owner Ted Segal. 2023 saw the Dynamo qualify for the MLS Cup Playoffs for the first time since 2017 after finishing 4th in the Western Conference. There they would advance past Real Salt Lake in the first round 2 games to 1 in a best of 3 series and defeat Sporting Kansas City 1–0 to advance to the Conference Finals, where they would fall 2–1 to LAFC. The season was highlighted by the club's second ever Open Cup title, winning 2–1 at Inter Miami in the final.

Team captain Héctor Herrera set a club record for assists in a season with 21 and was the first Dynamo player included in the MLS Best XI since Brad Davis in 2011.

== Final roster ==
As of December 3, 2023

Appearances and goals are totals for MLS regular season only.

No.	Name	Nationality	Position	Date of birth (Age)	Signed from	Signed in	Apps.	Goals
Goalkeepers
12	Steve Clark	(United States)	GK	April 14, 1986 (age 37)	Portland Timbers	2022	66	0
13	Andrew Tarbell	(United States)	GK	October 7, 1993 (age 30)	Austin FC	2023	1	0
38	Xavier Valdez (HGP)	(Dominican Republic)	GK	November 23, 2003 (age 20)	Houston Dynamo Academy	2022	0	0
Defenders
2	Franco Escobar	(Argentina)	DF	February 21, 1995 (age 28)	Los Angeles FC	2023	28	2
3	Brad Smith	(Australia)	DF	April 9, 1994 (age 29)	D.C. United	2023	18	1
4	Ethan Bartlow (GA)	(United States)	DF	February 2, 2000 (age 23)	University of Washington	2021	42	0
5	Daniel Steres	(United States)	DF	November 11, 1990 (age 33)	LA Galaxy	2022	44	4
17	Teenage Hadebe (DP)	(Zimbabwe)	DF	September 17, 1995 (age 28)	Yeni Malatyaspor	2021	51	3
22	Tate Schmitt	(United States)	DF	May 28, 1997 (age 26)	Real Salt Lake	2023	5	1
24	Mujeeb Murana (HGP)	(Nigeria)	DF	September 23, 2000 (age 23)	Houston Dynamo 2	2023	0	0
25	Griffin Dorsey	(United States)	DF	March 5, 1999 (age 24)	Toronto FC	2021	66	6
28	Erik Sviatchenko	(Denmark)	DF	October 4, 1991 (age 32)	Midtjylland	2023	17	0
30	Chase Gasper	(United States)	DF	January 25, 1996 (age 27)	LA Galaxy	2023	5	0
31	Micael	(Brazil)	DF	August 12, 2000 (age 23)	Atlético Mineiro	2022	25	1
Midfielders
6	Artur	(Brazil)	MF	March 11, 1996 (age 27)	Columbus Crew	2023	34	2
8	Amine Bassi	(Morocco)	MF	November 27, 1997 (age 26)	FC Metz	2023	28	10
16	Héctor Herrera (DP)	(Mexico)	MF	April 19, 1990 (age 33)	Atlético Madrid	2022	40	4
19	Charles Auguste	(Haiti)	MF	November 25, 1999 (age 24)	Creighton University	2023	0	0
20	Adalberto Carrasquilla	(Panama)	MF	November 28, 1998 (age 25)	Cartagena	2021	67	6
27	Luis Caicedo	(Colombia)	MF	May 18, 1996 (age 27)	Cortuluá	2023	25	0
32	Sebastian Kowalczyk	(Poland)	MF	August 22, 1998 (age 25)	Pogoń Szczecin	2023	8	0
35	Brooklyn Raines (HGP)	(United States)	MF	March 11, 2005 (age 18)	Barça Residency Academy	2022	8	0
Forwards
7	Iván Franco	(Paraguay)	FW	April 16, 2000 (age 23)	Club Libertad	2023	26	3
11	Corey Baird	(United States)	FW	January 30, 1996 (age 27)	Los Angeles FC	2021	64	10
18	Ibrahim Aliyu (U22)	(Nigeria)	FW	January 16, 2002 (age 21)	NK Lokomotiva Zagreb	2023	24	3
21	Nelson Quiñónes (U22)	(Colombia)	FW	August 20, 2002 (age 21)	Once Caldas	2022	36	4
23	Ifunanyachi Achara	(Nigeria)	FW	September 28, 1997 (age 26)	Toronto FC	2023	0	0
34	Thorleifur Úlfarsson (GA)	(Iceland)	FW	December 27, 2000 (age 22)	Duke University	2022	49	7

== Player movement ==
=== In ===
Per Major League Soccer and club policies terms of the deals do not get disclosed.

Date	Player	Position	Age	Previous club	Notes	Ref
November 22, 2022	(Brazil) Artur	MF	26	(United States) Columbus Crew	Acquired in exchange for $200,000 in 2023 GAM, $100,000 in 2024 GAM, and a conditional $50,000 in GAM	
November 23, 2022	(United States) Andrew Tarbell	GK	29	(United States) Austin FC	Signed on a free transfer	
December 7, 2022	(Nigeria) Ifunanyachi Achara	FW	25	(Canada) Toronto FC	Signed on a free transfer, acquired his rights in stage 2 of the 2022 MLS Re-Entry Draft on November 22, 2022	
December 21, 2022	(Haiti) Charles Auguste	MF	23	Creighton University	Undrafted free agent	
January 6, 2023	(Australia) Brad Smith	DF	28	(United States) D.C. United	Signed on a free transfer	
January 7, 2023	(Paraguay) Iván Franco	FW	22	(Paraguay) Club Libertad	Signed on loan for the 2023 season with an option to buy.	
January 12, 2023	(Argentina) Franco Escobar	DF	27	(United States) LAFC	Signed on a free transfer	
January 23, 2023	(Morocco) Amine Bassi	FW	25	(France) FC Metz	Full transfer for an undisclosed fee. Fee is reportedly $1.5 million.	
February 9, 2023	(Suriname) Djevencio van der Kust	DF	21	(Netherlands) FC Utrecht	Signed on loan with an option to buy.	
February 16, 2023	(Brazil) Micael	DF	22	(Brazil) Atlético Mineiro	Full transfer for an undisclosed fee. Fee is reportedly $500,000. Spent the previous season on loan to Houston Dynamo 2.	
February 16, 2023	(Nigeria) Mujeeb Murana	DF	22	(United States) Houston Dynamo 2	Signed as a homegrown player.	
February 17, 2023	(United States) Tate Schmitt	DF	25	(United States) Real Salt Lake	Signed on a free transfer. Acquired his player rights by sending a 3rd round pick in the 2024 MLS SuperDraft to RSL.	
February 23, 2023	(Colombia) Luis Caicedo	MF	26	(Colombia) Cortuluá	Signed on a free transfer.	
March 24, 2023	(Denmark) Erik Sviatchenko	DF	31	(Denmark) Midtjylland	Full transfer for an undisclosed fee. Fee is reportedly $1,480,000.	
April 16, 2023	(United States) Chase Gasper	DF	27	(United States) LA Galaxy	Claimed off waivers.	
April 25, 2023	(Nigeria) Ibrahim Aliyu	FW	21	(Croatia) NK Lokomotiva Zagreb	Full transfer for an undisclosed fee as a U-22 Initiative player. Fee is reportedly $2,300,000.	
July 13, 2023	(Colombia) Nelson Quiñónes	FW	20	(Colombia) Once Caldas	Exercised the purchase option on the loan. Transfer fee undisclosed but is reportedly $1,250,000, with Once Caldas maintaining a 25% sell-on clause.	
August 1, 2023	(Poland) Sebastian Kowalczyk	MF	24	(Poland) Pogoń Szczecin	Full transfer for an undisclosed fee. Fee is reportedly $540,000.	

=== Out ===
Date	Player	Position	Age	Destination Club	Notes	Ref
November 7, 2022	(Argentina) Mateo Bajamich	FW	23	(Argentina) Estudiantes de Río Cuarto	Contract option declined	
November 7, 2022	(United States) Ian Hoffmann	DF	21	(Norway) Moss FK	Contract option declined	
November 7, 2022	(United States) Marcelo Palomino	MF	21	(Sweden) AFC Eskilstuna	Contract option declined	
November 7, 2022	(Puerto Rico) Zarek Valentin	DF	31	(United States) Minnesota United	Contract option declined	
November 9, 2022	(United States) Fafà Picault	FW	31	(United States) Nashville SC	Traded for $50,000 of 2023 GAM, $50,000 of 2024 GAM, and a conditional $150,000 of 2024 GAM.	
November 11, 2022	(United States) Tim Parker	DF	29	(United States) St. Louis City SC	Traded for $250,000 of 2023 GAM and $250,000 of 2024 GAM. Dynamo will pay a portion of his salary for two seasons.	
November 16, 2022	(Colombia) Darwin Quintero	FW	35	(Colombia) América de Cali	Contract option declined	
November 16, 2022	(United States) Memo Rodriguez	MF	26	(United States) LA Galaxy	Contract option declined	
November 16, 2022	(Brazil) Zeca	DF	28	(Brazil) Esporte Clube Vitória	Contract option declined	
November 16, 2022	(El Salvador) Darwin Cerén	MF	32	(El Salvador) C.D. Águila	Contract expired	
November 16, 2022	(United States) Sam Junqua	DF	26	(United States) FC Dallas	Contract expired	
January 10, 2023	(Sweden) Adam Lundqvist	DF	28	(United States) Austin FC	Traded for $300,000 of 2023 GAM and $200,000 of 2024 GAM.	
February 16, 2023	(United States) Michael Nelson	GK	28	(United States) FC Tulsa	Waived	
June 30, 2023	(Suriname) Djevencio van der Kust	DF	22	(Netherlands) FC Utrecht	Loan ended/returned to Utrecht	
July 23, 2023	(Colombia) Juan Castilla	MF	18	(Colombia) Deportivo Cali	Sold for an undisclosed fee.	

=== Loans out ===
Date	Player	Position	Age	Destination Club	Notes	Ref
January 9, 2023	(Argentina) Matías Vera	MF	27	(Argentina) Argentinos Juniors	Loaned for remainder of 2023.	
March 3, 2023	(El Salvador) Danny Ríos	FW	19	(United States) Las Vegas Lights	Loaned for remainder of 2023.	
May 26, 2023	(United States) Beto Avila	FW	22	(United States) Charleston Battery	Loaned for remainder of 2023.	
July 27, 2023	(Paraguay) Sebastián Ferreira	FW	25	(Brazil) Vasco da Gama	Loaned for remainder of 2023.	

=== MLS SuperDraft ===
Round	Pick	Player	Position	Age	College	Notes	Ref
2	34	Isaiah Reid	FW	21	Clemson	Signed with Houston Dynamo 2.	
3	63	Frantz Pierrot	MF	23	Connecticut	Signed with Athlone Town.	

== Staff ==
As of December 3, 2023

Executive
Majority owner	(United States) Ted Segal
Minority owners	(United States) Lyle Ayes (United States) James Harden
General manager/vice president	(Canada) Pat Onstad
Technical director	(United States) Asher Mendelsohn
Assistant general manager	(United States) Nick Kowba
Director of soccer operations	(United States) Francisco Tobar
Coaching staff
Head coach	(United States) Ben Olsen
Assistant coach	(United States) Brendan Burke
Assistant coach	(France) Aurélien Collin
Assistant coach	(Germany) Adin Osmanbašić
Goalkeeper coach	(United States) Tim Hanley
Head of performance	(Republic of Ireland) Paul Caffrey
Head video analyst	(United States) Carlon Carpenter
Head of sports science	(Australia) Alex Calder
Strength & conditioning coach	(United States) Anthony Narcisi
Director of sports medicine	(United States) Craig Devine
Head athletic trainer	(United States) Matt Murphy
Assistant athletic trainer	(United States) Juan Castano
Physical therapist	(United States) Micah Kust
Massage therapist	(United States) Ivan Diaz
Scouting coordinator & analyst	(Uruguay) Sebastian Romero
Director of methodology	(England) Ben Bartlett
Player care manager	(United States) Martha Carvajal
Head equipment manager	(United States) Jaime Gonzalez

== Friendlies ==
=== Preseason ===
February 1	Club América	6–1	Houston Dynamo	Mexico City, Mexico
		Report		Stadium: Instalaciones Club América en Coapa

February 4	Tlaxcala	0–2	Houston Dynamo	Mexico City, Mexico
		Report		Stadium: Mini Estadio de la Federación Mexicana de Futbol

February 7	UNAM Pumas	0–0	Houston Dynamo	Mexico City, Mexico
		Report

February 11	CF Montréal	2–2	Houston Dynamo	Fort Lauderdale, Florida
5:00 CST	Rea; Ibrahim	Report	Úlfarsson; Franco

February 15	Columbus Crew	1–1	Houston Dynamo	Fort Lauderdale, Florida
	Hernández	Report	Baird (pen.)

February 18	Houston Dynamo	2–0	FC Dallas	Houston, Texas
7:30 CST	Steres 31'; Baird 67' (pen.)	Report		Stadium: Shell Energy Stadium

== Competitions ==
=== Major League Soccer ===
==== Standings ====
===== Western Conference =====
MLS Western Conference table (2023)
Pos	Team	Pld	W	L	T	GF	GA	GD	Pts	Qualification
2	Seattle Sounders FC	34	14	9	11	41	32	+9	53	Qualification for round one
3	Los Angeles FC	34	14	10	10	54	39	+15	52	Qualification for round one
4	Houston Dynamo FC	34	14	11	9	51	38	+13	51	Qualification for round one
5	Real Salt Lake	34	14	12	8	48	50	−2	50	Qualification for round one
6	Vancouver Whitecaps FC	34	12	10	12	55	48	+7	48	Qualification for round one

Source: MLS
Rules for classification: 1) points; 2) total wins; 3) total goal differential; 4) total goals scored; 5) fewer disciplinary points; 6) away goal differential; 7) away goals scored; 8) home goals differential; 9) home goals scored; 10) coin toss (2 clubs tied) or drawing of lots (≥3 clubs tied)

===== Overall =====
Overall MLS standings table
Pos	Team	Pld	W	L	T	GF	GA	GD	Pts	Qualification
7	Seattle Sounders FC	34	14	9	11	41	32	+9	53	Qualification for the U.S. Open Cup Round of 32 (Note: As one of the top seven teams in the overall table to not qualify for the 2024 CONCACAF Champions Cup)
8	Los Angeles FC	34	14	10	10	54	39	+15	52	Qualification for the U.S. Open Cup Round of 32
9	Houston Dynamo FC (U)	34	14	11	9	51	38	+13	51	Qualification for the CONCACAF Champions Cup Round One and U.S. Open Cup Round of 32 (Note: Qualify for both the Champions Cup and U.S. Open Cup as 2023 U.S. Open Cup champions)
10	Atlanta United FC	34	13	9	12	66	53	+13	51	Qualification for the U.S. Open Cup Round of 32
11	Real Salt Lake	34	14	12	8	48	50	−2	50	Qualification for the U.S. Open Cup Round of 32

Source: MLS
Rules for classification: 1) points; 2) total wins; 3) total goal differential; 4) total goals scored; 5) fewer disciplinary points; 6) away goal differential; 7) away goals scored; 8) home goals differential; 9) home goals scored; 10) coin toss (2 clubs tied) or drawing of lots (≥3 clubs tied)
(U) U.S. Open Cup winner

==== Results summary ====
Overall								Home						Away					
Pld	W	D	L	GF	GA	GD	Pts	W	D	L	GF	GA	GD	W	D	L	GF	GA	GD
33	14	8	11	51	38	+13	50	11	3	2	36	11	+25	3	5	9	15	27	−12

==== Results by round ====
Round	1	2	3	4	5	6	7	8	9	10	11	12	13	14	15	16	17	18	19	20	21	22	23	24	25	26	27	28	29	30	31	32	33	34
Stadium	A	A	H	H	A	H	A	H	H	H	A	A	H	A	A	H	A	H	A	A	H	H	A	H	A	H	A	H	H	A	H	A	H	A
Result	L	L	W	W	L	W	D	W	D	L	L	D	W	L	L	W	W	W	L	L	D	L	D	W	W	W	D	D	W	L	D	D	W	W
Position (conf.)	10	14	9	8	8	7	7	6	6	7	8	10	7	9	10	7	6	4	4	7	8	8	9	6	5	4	5	5	4	4	5	6	4	4
Position (league)	20	29	21	17	18	12	14	11	13	19	20	23	17	20	21	17	13	10	11	14	16	17	19	14	13	11	12	11	10	11	12	12	10	9

Updated to match(es) played on October 23, 2023. Source: Match results
A = Away; H = Home; W = Win; D = Draw; L = Loss

==== Match results ====
February 25 1	FC Cincinnati	2–1	Houston Dynamo	Cincinnati, Ohio
7:30 PM CST	Santos 19'; Nwobodo 48'; Barreal (yellow card) 84'	Report	Artur (yellow card) 10'; Schmitt 45+2', (yellow card) 81'	Stadium: TQL Stadium; Attendance: 25,513; Referee: Chris Penso

March 4 2	New England Revolution	3–0	Houston Dynamo	Foxborough, Massachusetts
7:30 PM EST	Borrero 42'; Buck (yellow card) 46'; Wood 53'; Bye 65'; Jones (yellow card) 88'	Report	Dorsey (yellow card) 18'; Carrasquilla (yellow card) 24'; Clark (yellow card) 37'; Bartlow (yellow card) 87'	Stadium: Gillette Stadium; Attendance: 13,176; Referee: Fotis Bazakos

March 18 3 Copa Tejas	Houston Dynamo	2–0	Austin FC	Houston, Texas
7:30 PM CDT	Franco (yellow card) 59'; Bassi 71' (pen.); Herrera 86'	Report	Väisänen (yellow card) 19'; Fagúndez (yellow card) 52'; Lundqvist (yellow card) 70'	Stadium: Shell Energy Stadium; Attendance: 19,047; Referee: Drew Fischer

March 25 4	Houston Dynamo	1–0	New York City FC	Houston, Texas
7:30 PM CDT	Artur (yellow card) 18'; Bassi 55' (pen.); Dorsey (yellow card) 90'	Report	Parks (yellow card) 29'; Rodríguez (yellow card) 55'; Gray (yellow card) 90+3'; Barraza (yellow card) 90+9'	Stadium: Shell Energy Stadium; Attendance: 13,024; Referee: Guido Gonzalez Jr.

April 1 5	San Jose Earthquakes	2–1	Houston Dynamo	San Jose, California
9:30 PM CDT	Espinoza 7' (pen.), 65' (pen.); Mensah (yellow card) 17'; Akapo (yellow card) 33'; Monteiro (yellow card) 59'	Report	Bassi 42' (pen.); Artur (yellow card) 44'; Escobar (yellow card) 64'	Stadium: PayPal Park; Attendance: 12,786; Referee: Tori Penso

April 8 6	Houston Dynamo	3–0	LA Galaxy	Houston, Texas
7:30 PM CDT	Herrera 35', (yellow card) 27' (yellow-red card) 90+5'; Bassi (yellow card) 42', (goal) 65' (pen.), 73'; Caicedo (yellow card) 77'	Report	Cáceres (yellow card) 34' (yellow-red card) 63'; Edwards (yellow card) 61'; Brugman (yellow card) 64'; Costa (red card) 90+7'	Stadium: Shell Energy Stadium; Attendance: 19,128; Referee: Alex Chilowicz

April 15 7	New York Red Bulls	1–1	Houston Dynamo	Harrison, New Jersey
6:30 PM CDT	Tolkin (yellow card) 14'; Duncan (yellow card) 66'; Fernandez 89'	Report	Escobar (yellow card) 25'; Carrasquilla 67'; Caicedo (yellow card) 82'	Stadium: Red Bull Arena; Attendance: 12,932; Referee: Ramy Touchan

April 22 8	Houston Dynamo	1–0	Inter Miami	Houston, Texas
7:30 PM CDT	Steres 72'	Report	Negri (yellow card) 34'	Stadium: Shell Energy Stadium; Attendance: 16,045; Referee: Rosendo Mendoza

May 6 9	Houston Dynamo	0–0	Real Salt Lake	Houston, Texas
7:30 PM CDT	Escobar (yellow card) 57'; Quiñónes (yellow card) 90+1'	Report	Glad (yellow card) 45'; Oviedo (yellow card) 83'	Stadium: Shell Energy Stadium; Attendance: 13,793; Referee: Lukasz Szpala

May 13 10	Houston Dynamo	0–1	Seattle Sounders	Houston, Texas
7:30 PM CDT	Bassi (red card) 21'; Herrera (yellow card) 58' (yellow-red card) 78'; Bartlow (yellow card) 90+6'	Report	Lodeiro (yellow card) 62'; Ragen (yellow card) 64'; Rothrock 87'	Stadium: Shell Energy Stadium; Attendance: 14,061; Referee: Rubiel Vazquez

May 17 11	Minnesota United	1–0	Houston Dynamo	Saint Paul, Minnesota
7:30 PM CDT	Hlongwane 14' (yellow card) 40'; Trapp (yellow card) 30'; Dotson (yellow card) 67'	Report	Micael (yellow card) 50'	Stadium: Allianz Field; Attendance: 18,897; Referee: Marcos de Oliveira

May 20 12 Texas Derby	FC Dallas	1–1	Houston Dynamo	Frisco, Texas
7:30 PM CDT	Obrian 53'	Report	Gasper (yellow card) 25'; Úlfarsson 85'; Escobar (yellow card) 90+2'	Stadium: Toyota Stadium; Attendance: 19,096; Referee: Victor Rivas

May 27 13 Copa Tejas	Houston Dynamo	2–1	Austin FC	Houston, Texas
7:30 PM CDT	Herrera 37'; Quiñónes (yellow card) 67'; Franco 87'; Micael (yellow card) 90+3'	Report	Zardes 22'; Cascante (yellow card) 30'	Stadium: Shell Energy Stadium; Attendance: 16,055; Referee: Ted Unkel

May 31 14	Vancouver Whitecaps	6–2	Houston Dynamo	Vancouver, British Columbia
9:30 PM CDT	Vite 1'; Gressel 18', 59', (yellow card) 41'; White 46'; Laborda (yellow card) 70'; Córdova (yellow card) 79'; Berhalter 88'; Gauld 90+5'	Report	Baird 8'; Bassi 16'; Quiñónes (red card) 69'; Carrasquilla (yellow card) 69'; Clark (yellow card) 84'	Stadium: BC Place; Attendance: 13,232; Referee: Mark Allatin

June 3 15	St. Louis City SC	3–0	Houston Dynamo	St. Louis, Missouri
7:30 PM CDT	Löwen 9'; Blom (yellow card) 45+5'; Ostrák 51'; Jackson (yellow card) 69'; Gioacchini 83'; Alm (yellow card) 90+1'	Report	Caicedo (yellow card) 45+2'; Carrasquilla (yellow card) 45+5'; Franco (yellow card) 45+7'; Bartlow (yellow card) 78'	Stadium: Citypark; Attendance: 22,423; Referee: Joseph Dickerson

June 10 16	Houston Dynamo	4–0	Los Angeles FC	Houston, Texas
7:30 PM CDT	Quiñónes 11'; Bassi 50'; Clark (yellow card) 53'; Baird 69', (yellow card) 81'; Escobar (yellow card) 79', (goal) 89'	Report	Cifuentes (yellow card) 32'	Stadium: Shell Energy Stadium; Attendance: 15,366; Referee: Alex Chilowicz

June 14 17	Los Angeles FC	0–1	Houston Dynamo	Los Angeles, California
9:30 PM CDT	Biuk (yellow card) 22'; Sánchez (yellow card) 27'; Opoku (red card) 79'; Palacios (yellow card) 89'	Report	Micael 23'; Clark (yellow card) 64'; Artur (yellow card) 76'; Sviatchenko (yellow card) 90+2'; Baird (yellow card); Steres (yellow card) 90+3'	Stadium: BMO Stadium; Attendance: 22,177; Referee: Guido Gonzalez Jr.
Note: Originally scheduled for April 29, match was rescheduled due to Los Angeles FC's participation in the 2023 CONCACAF Champions League.

June 21 18	Houston Dynamo	4–1	San Jose Earthquakes	Houston, Texas
7:30 PM CDT	Bassi 3'; Baird 5'; Sviatchenko (yellow card) 37'; Úlfarsson 77', 89'; Herrera (yellow card) 86'	Report	Ebobisse (yellow card) 38'; Akapo; Bouda (yellow card) 50'; Judson (yellow card) 67'; Yueill (yellow card) 81'; Skahan (yellow card) 85'	Stadium: Shell Energy Stadium; Attendance: 14,249; Referee: Ismir Pekmic

June 24 19 Copa Tejas	Austin FC	3–0	Houston Dynamo	Austin, Texas
7:30 PM CDT	Finlay 22'; Zardes 32'; Gallagher (yellow card) 39'; Wolff (yellow card) 45'; Cascante 50', (yellow card) 77'; Pereira (yellow card) 68'; Lima (yellow card) 75'	Report	Sviatchenko (yellow card) 31'; Artur (yellow card) 45+5'; Herrera (yellow card) 77'	Stadium: Q2 Stadium; Attendance: 20,738; Referee: Victor Rivas

July 1 20	Seattle Sounders	1–0	Houston Dynamo	Seattle, Washington
9:30 PM CDT	Cissoko (yellow card) 18'; Baker (yellow card) 54'; Rusnák 67'	Report	Micael (yellow card) 61' (yellow-red card) 62'; Caicedo (yellow card) 89'; Sviatchenko (yellow card) 90+4'	Stadium: Lumen Field; Attendance: 31,840; Referee: Rosendo Mendoza

July 8 21	Houston Dynamo	2–2	Sporting Kansas City	Houston, Texas
7:30 PM CDT	Aliyu 45+2'; Úlfarsson (yellow card) 49'; Herrera (yellow card) 50'; Franco 90+8'; Ferreira (yellow card) 90+10'	Report	Pulido 25', 62' (pen.); Rosero (yellow card) 65'; Leibold (yellow card) 90+11'	Stadium: Shell Energy Stadium; Attendance: 16,489; Referee: Nima Saghafi

July 12 22	Houston Dynamo	0–3	Minnesota United	Houston, Texas
7:30 PM CDT	Micael (yellow card) 68'; Escobar (yellow card) 90+1'	Report	Hlongwane 15'; Pukki 20'; Tajouri-Shradi 87'	Stadium: Shell Energy Stadium; Attendance: 11,855; Referee: Marcos de Oliveira

July 15 23	Colorado Rapids	0–0	Houston Dynamo	Commerce City, Colorado
8:30 PM CDT		Report	Ibrahim (yellow card) 30'; Quiñónes (yellow card) 45+1'	Stadium: Dick's Sporting Goods Park; Attendance: 16,138; Referee: Filip Dujic

August 20 24	Houston Dynamo	5–0	Portland Timbers	Houston, Texas
7:30 PM CDT	Bassi 5' (pen.); Quiñónes 11'; Baird 14'; Escobar (yellow card) 22', (goal) 45+3'; Dorsey (yellow card) 45+4'; Smith 63'	Report	Zuparic (yellow card) 45+1'; Evander (yellow card) 89'; Araujo (yellow card) 90'	Stadium: Shell Energy Stadium; Attendance: 12,670; Referee: Marcos de Oliveira

August 26 25	Real Salt Lake	0–3	Houston Dynamo	Sandy, Utah
8:30 PM CDT	Chang (yellow card) 50'; Julio (yellow card) 63'	Report	Baird 9'; Steres 29'; Carrasquilla 75'	Stadium: America First Field; Attendance: 21,471; Referee: Alex Chilowicz

August 30 26	Houston Dynamo	2–0	Columbus Crew	Houston, Texas
7:30 PM CDT	Baird 14'; Dorsey (yellow card) 58'; Carrasquilla (yellow card) 81'; Sviatchenko (yellow card) 87'; Ibrahim 90'	Report	Cheberko (yellow card) 4'; Zawadzki (yellow card) 71'	Stadium: Shell Energy Stadium; Attendance: 10,873; Referee: Jair Marrufo

September 2 27	LA Galaxy	0–0	Houston Dynamo	Carson, California
9:30 PM CDT	Edwards (yellow card) 34'	Report	Steres (yellow card) 38'; Caicedo (yellow card) 55'; Quiñónes (yellow card) 64'; Artur (yellow card) 90+8'	Stadium: Dignity Health Sports Park; Attendance: 20,035; Referee: Armando Villarreal

September 16 28	Houston Dynamo	1–1	St. Louis City SC	Houston, Texas
7:30 PM CDT	Sviatchenko (yellow card) 8'; Escobar (yellow card) 22'; Herrera (yellow card) 25'; Baird 42'; Carrasquilla (yellow card) 61'	Report	Blom (yellow card) 34'; Klauss 87'; Parker (yellow card) 90+5'	Stadium: Shell Energy Stadium; Attendance: 14,369; Referee: Ismir Pekmic

September 20 29	Houston Dynamo	4–1	Vancouver Whitecaps	Houston, Texas
7:30 PM CDT	Herrera 13'; Kowalczyk (yellow card) 30'; Sviatchenko (yellow card) 36'; Dorsey 44', (yellow card) 52'; Baird (yellow card) 49'; Micael (yellow card) 60'; Franco 73'; Ibrahim 84'	Report	Raposo (yellow card) 2'; Perea (yellow card) 24'; Sviatchenko 90' (o.g.)	Stadium: Shell Energy Stadium; Attendance: 13,866; Referee: Fotis Bazakos

September 23 30	Sporting Kansas City	2–1	Houston Dynamo	Kansas City, Kansas
7:30 PM CDT	Russell 7' (pen.), (red card) 39'; Radoja (yellow card) 34'; Agada 45+6'; Thommy (yellow card) 73'; Rosero (yellow card) 89'; Sallói (yellow card) 90+6'	Report	Escobar (yellow card) 45+1'; Hadebe 45+9'; Dorsey (yellow card) 74'; Caicedo (yellow card) 83'	Stadium: Children's Mercy Park; Attendance: 18,033; Referee: Chris Penso

September 30 31 Texas Derby	Houston Dynamo	0–0	FC Dallas	Houston, Texas
7:30 PM CDT	Hadebe (yellow card) 8'; Franco (yellow card) 29'; Carrasquilla (yellow card) 71'; Herrera (yellow card) 84'	Report	Tafari (yellow card) 41'	Stadium: Shell Energy Stadium; Attendance: 18,175; Referee: Ismail Elfath

October 4 32	CF Montréal	1–1	Houston Dynamo	Montreal, Quebec
6:30 PM CDT	Piette (yellow card) 33'; Lappalainen 90+6'	Report	Artur 10'; Ibrahim (yellow card) 18'; Bartlow (yellow card) 56'; Carrasquilla (yellow card) 62'; Quiñónes (yellow card) 84'; Escobar (yellow card) 90+3'; Baird (yellow card) 90+3'	Stadium: Saputo Stadium; Attendance: 13,509; Referee: Ramy Touchan

October 7 33	Houston Dynamo	5–1	Colorado Rapids	Houston, Texas
7:30 PM CDT	Quiñónes 3', 28'; Bassi 8'; Baird 41'; Dorsey (yellow card) 48'; Artur 84'	Report	Bassett 53', (yellow card) 63'; Abubakar (yellow card) 57'; Priso (yellow card) 86'	Stadium: Shell Energy Stadium; Attendance: 16,430; Referee: Tori Penso

October 21 34	Portland Timbers	1–3	Houston Dynamo	Portland, Oregon
8:00 PM CDT	Chará (yellow card) 66'; McGraw (yellow card) 74'; Mora 80'	Report	Dorsey 11', 71'; Micael (yellow card) 41'; Escobar (yellow card) 42'; Carrasquilla (yellow card) 45+4', (goal) 48'; Herrera (yellow card) 67'	Stadium: Providence Park; Attendance: 25,218; Referee: Rubiel Vazquez

==== MLS Cup Playoffs ====
===== Round One =====
October 29 Game 1	Houston Dynamo	2–1	Real Salt Lake	Houston, Texas
5:00 PM CDT	Herrera 22'; Bassi 79'; Escobar (yellow card) 90+5'; Carrasquilla (yellow card) 90+7'	Report	Oviedo (yellow card) 44'; Luna 54'; Julio (yellow card) 82'	Stadium: Shell Energy Stadium; Attendance: 17,508; Referee: Guido Gonzales Jr.

November 6 Game 2	Real Salt Lake	1–1 (5–4 p)	Houston Dynamo	Sandy, Utah
8:00 PM CST	Glad (yellow card) 27'; Ojeda (yellow card) 33'; Vera (yellow card) 52'; Savarino 70'	Report	Clark (yellow card) 16'; Bassi (yellow card) 17', (goal) 28'; Dorsey (yellow card) 48'; Carrasquilla (yellow card) 69'; Sviatchenko (yellow card) 71'	Stadium: America First Field; Attendance: 20,251; Referee: Fotis Bazakos
	Penalties
	Arango (penalty scored); Kreilach (penalty scored); Savarino (penalty scored); Vera (penalty scored); Luna (penalty scored)		(penalty missed) Bassi; (penalty scored) Carrasquilla; (penalty scored) Úlfarrson; (penalty scored) Dorsey; (penalty scored) Quiñónes

November 11 Game 3	Houston Dynamo	1–1 (4–3 p)	Real Salt Lake	Houston, Texas
3:00 PM CST	Baird (yellow card) 20', (goal) 28'	Report	Savarino (yellow card) 46'; Luna 65'; Arango (yellow card) 66'; Vera (yellow card) 72'	Stadium: Shell Energy Stadium; Attendance: 16,374; Referee: Chris Penso
	Penalties
	Carrasquilla (penalty scored); Úlfarrson (penalty scored); Bassi (penalty scored); Quiñónes (penalty missed); Dorsey (penalty scored)		(penalty scored) Arango; (penalty scored) Rubin; (penalty missed) Luna; (penalty scored) Vera; (penalty missed) Musovski
Note: Houston Dynamo won the series 2–1.

===== Conference Semifinals =====
November 26 Conference semifinals	Houston Dynamo	1–0	Sporting Kansas City	Houston, Texas
6:00 CST	Escobar 39'; Carrasquilla (yellow card) 69'	Report	Leibold (yellow card) 78'	Stadium: Shell Energy Stadium; Attendance: 20,319; Referee: Guido Gonzales Jr.

===== Conference Finals =====
December 2 Conference finals	Los Angeles FC	2–0	Houston Dynamo	Los Angeles, California
8:30 CST	Hollingshead 44'; Escobar 80' (o.g.)	Report	Escobar (yellow card) 45+3'; Herrera (yellow card) 71'	Stadium: BMO Stadium; Attendance: 22,221; Referee: Victor Rivas

=== U.S. Open Cup ===
April 26 Third Round	Tampa Bay Rowdies (USLC) (Florida)	0–1	(Texas) Houston Dynamo (MLS)	St. Petersburg, Florida
6:30 PM CDT	Dennis (yellow card) 21'; Antley (yellow card) 65'	Report	Hadebe (yellow card) 37'; Raines 44'; Baird (yellow card) 76'	Stadium: Al Lang Stadium; Attendance: 1,956; Referee: Elvis Osmanovic

May 10 Round of 32	Houston Dynamo (MLS) (Texas)	1–0	Sporting Kansas City (MLS)	Houston, Texas
7:30 PM CDT	Úlfarsson 12'; Gasper (red card) 35'; Dorsey (yellow card) 87'	Report	Espinoza (yellow card) 10'; Sallói (yellow card) 90+3'	Stadium: Shell Energy Stadium; Attendance: 5,094; Referee: Sergii Demianchuk

May 23 Round of 16	Houston Dynamo (MLS) (Texas)	4–0	Minnesota United (MLS)	Houston, Texas
7:30 PM CDT	Baird 33' (pen.), 68', 89'; Caicedo (yellow card) 82'; Ibrahim 79'	Report	Arriaga (yellow card) 30' (yellow-red card) 38'; Boxall (yellow card) 67'	Stadium: Shell Energy Stadium; Attendance: 2,947; Referee: Ramy Touchan

June 6 Quarterfinals	Chicago Fire (MLS) (Illinois)	1–4	(Texas) Houston Dynamo (MLS)	Bridgeview, Illinois
7:30 PM CDT	Pineda (yellow card) 21'; Souquet 40'; Navarro (yellow card) 62'; Giménez (yellow card) 63'; Burks (yellow card) 90'	Report	Bassi 12' (pen.); Ibrahim 31', 59'; Quiñónes 74'; Gasper (yellow card) 89'	Stadium: SeatGeek Stadium; Attendance: 7,512; Referee: Marcos De Oliveira

August 23 Semifinals	Houston Dynamo (MLS) (Texas)	3–1 (a.e.t.)	(Utah) Real Salt Lake (MLS)	Houston, Texas
8:30 PM CDT	Dorsey (yellow card) 22'; Herrera (yellow card) 38', (goal) 45+5'; Carrasquilla (yellow card) 93', (goal) 105'; Artur (yellow card) 118'; Caicedo 120+5'	Report	Vera (yellow card) 38' (yellow-red card) 119'; Arango (yellow card) 59'; Julio 64'; Eneli (yellow card) 67'; A. Gómez (yellow card) 72'; Glad (yellow card) 106'; Palacio (yellow card) 114'	Stadium: Shell Energy Stadium; Attendance: 11,137; Referee: Lukasz Szpala

September 27 Final	Inter Miami (MLS) (Florida)	1–2	(Texas) Houston Dynamo (MLS)	Fort Lauderdale, Florida
7:30 PM CDT	Kryvtsov (yellow card) 16'; Allen (yellow card) 19'; Yedlin (yellow card) 32'; Martínez 90+2'	Report	Escobar (yellow card) 12'; Dorsey 24'; Bassi 33' (pen.)	Stadium: DRV PNK Stadium; Attendance: 20,288; Referee: Jon Freemon

=== Leagues Cup ===
==== South 2 Group Stage ====
Pos	Team	Pld	W	PW	PL	L	GF	GA	GD	Pts	Qualification	ORL	HOU	SAN
1	(United States) Orlando City SC	2	1	1	0	0	4	3	+1	5	Advance to knockout stage	—	1–1	—
2	(United States) Houston Dynamo FC	2	0	1	1	0	3	3	0	3	Advance to knockout stage	—	—	—
3	(Mexico) Santos Laguna	2	0	0	1	1	4	5	−1	1		2–3	2–2	—

Source: Leagues Cup
Rules for classification: Tiebreakers

July 21	Orlando City SC (United States)	1–1 (5–4 p)	(United States) Houston Dynamo	Orlando, Florida
7:30 PM CDT	Jansson (yellow card) 45+4'; Gallese (yellow card) 45+4'; McGuire 46'; Torres (yellow card) 64'; Angulo (yellow card) 89'	Report	Bassi 45+5' (pen.)	Stadium: Exploria Stadium; Attendance: 14,005; Referee: Filip Dujic
	Penalties
	Kara (penalty scored); Santos (penalty scored); Jansson (penalty scored); Carlos (penalty scored); Torres (penalty scored)		(penalty missed) Herrera; (penalty scored) Úlfarsson; (penalty scored) Carrasquilla; (penalty scored) Dorsey; (penalty scored) Smith

July 25	Houston Dynamo (United States)	2–2 (5–4 p)	(Mexico) Santos Laguna	Houston, Texas
7:00 PM CDT	Baird 14'; Dorsey 26'	Report	Preciado 45', 62' (pen.), (yellow card) 64'; Vergara (yellow card) 65'; Cervantes (yellow card) 79'	Stadium: Shell Energy Stadium; Attendance: 12,627; Referee: Ismael Cornejo
	Penalties
	Bassi (penalty scored); Úlfarsson (penalty scored); Franco (penalty scored); Smith (penalty scored); Caicedo (penalty scored)		(penalty scored) Brunetta; (penalty scored) Preciado; (penalty scored) Dória; (penalty scored) Torres; (penalty missed) López

==== Knockout Stage ====
August 2 Round of 32	Houston Dynamo (United States)	0–0 (5–3 p)	(Mexico) Pachuca	Houston, Texas
8:00 PM CDT	Artur (yellow card) 53'; Herrera (yellow card) 60'; Escobar (yellow card) 63'	Report	Rodríguez (yellow card) 62'; Castillo (yellow card) 68'; Sánchez (yellow card) 69'; Cabral (yellow card) 71'	Stadium: Shell Energy Stadium; Attendance: 10,438; Referee: Edgar Allan Morales Olvera
	Penalties
	Úlfarsson (penalty scored); Quiñones (penalty scored); Herrera (penalty scored); Dorsey (penalty scored); Caicedo (penalty scored)		(penalty scored) Cabral; (penalty scored) I. Hernández; (penalty scored) Sánchez; (penalty missed) Figueroa

August 7 Round of 16	Houston Dynamo (United States)	1–2	(United States) Charlotte FC	Houston, Texas
9:00 PM CDT	Baird 10'; Escobar (yellow card) 90+5'; Ibrahim (yellow card) 90+6'	Report	Agyemang 80'; Micael 81' (o.g.); Byrne (yellow card) 84'	Stadium: Shell Energy Stadium; Attendance: 9,188; Referee: Pierre-Luc Lauziere

== Player statistics ==
=== Appearances, goals, and assists ===
No.	Pos.	Nat.	Player	Total			MLS			Playoffs			U.S. Open Cup			Leagues Cup		
No.	Pos.	Nat.	Player	Apps	G	A	Apps	G	A	Apps	G	A	Apps	G	A	Apps	G	A
2	DF	(Argentina)	Franco Escobar	41	3	1	28	2	1	5	1	0	4	0	0	4	0	0
3	DF	(Australia)	Brad Smith	21	1	2	18	1	2	3	0	0	4	0	0	2	0	0
4	DF	(United States)	Ethan Bartlow	32	0	1	27	0	1	0	0	0	5	0	0	0	0	0
5	DF	(United States)	Daniel Steres	28	2	2	26	2	2	0	0	0	2	0	0	0	0	0
6	MF	(Brazil)	Artur	47	2	1	34	2	0	5	0	0	4	0	1	4	0	0
7	FW	(Paraguay)	Iván Franco	33	3	4	26	3	3	0	0	0	3	0	1	4	0	0
8	MF	(Morocco)	Amine Bassi	42	15	8	28	10	4	5	2	0	5	2	4	4	1	0
9	FW	(Paraguay)	Sebastián Ferreira (Note: Loaned out during the season)	13	0	0	11	0	0	0	0	0	2	0	0	0	0	0
11	FW	(United States)	Corey Baird	48	14	8	34	8	6	5	1	0	5	3	2	4	2	0
12	GK	(United States)	Steve Clark	41	0	2	33	0	2	5	0	0	0	0	0	3	0	0
13	GK	(United States)	Andrew Tarbell	8	0	0	1	0	0	0	0	0	6	0	0	1	0	0
14	FW	(United States)	Beto Avila	0	0	0	0	0	0	0	0	0	0	0	0	0	0	0
15	DF	(Suriname)	Djevencio van der Kust (Note: Transferred out during the season)	1	0	0	0	0	0	0	0	0	1	0	0	0	0	0
16	MF	(Mexico)	Héctor Herrera	44	6	21	30	4	17	5	1	2	5	1	1	4	0	1
17	DF	(Zimbabwe)	Teenage Hadebe	16	1	0	12	1	0	2	0	0	2	0	0	0	0	0
18	FW	(Nigeria)	Ibrahim Aliyu	37	6	4	24	3	3	4	0	0	5	3	1	4	0	0
19	MF	(Haiti)	Charles Auguste	1	0	0	0	0	0	0	0	0	1	0	0	0	0	0
20	MF	(Panama)	Adalberto Carrasquilla	38	4	11	25	3	8	5	0	1	4	1	1	4	0	1
21	FW	(Colombia)	Nelson Quiñónes	41	5	4	28	4	2	5	0	1	5	1	0	3	0	1
22	DF	(United States)	Tate Schmitt	5	1	0	5	1	0	0	0	0	0	0	0	0	0	0
23	FW	(Nigeria)	Ifunanyachi Achara	0	0	0	0	0	0	0	0	0	0	0	0	0	0	0
24	DF	(Nigeria)	Mujeeb Murana	2	0	0	0	0	0	0	0	0	2	0	0	0	0	0
25	DF	(United States)	Griffin Dorsey	33	5	3	19	3	2	5	0	0	5	1	0	4	1	1
27	MF	(Colombia)	Luis Caicedo	37	1	0	25	0	0	2	0	0	6	1	0	4	0	0
28	DF	(Denmark)	Erik Sviatchenko	30	0	1	17	0	1	5	0	0	4	0	0	4	0	0
30	DF	(United States)	Chase Gasper	8	0	0	5	0	0	0	0	0	3	0	0	0	0	0
31	DF	(Brazil)	Micael	37	1	0	24	1	0	5	0	0	4	0	0	4	0	0
32	MF	(Colombia)	Juan Castilla	0	0	0	0	0	0	0	0	0	0	0	0	0	0	0
32	MF	(Poland)	Sebastian Kowalczyk	9	0	1	8	0	1	1	0	0	0	0	0	0	0	0
33	FW	(El Salvador)	Danny Ríos	0	0	0	0	0	0	0	0	0	0	0	0	0	0	0
34	FW	(Iceland)	Thorleifur Úlfarsson	28	4	1	18	3	1	3	0	0	3	1	0	0	0	0
35	MF	(United States)	Brooklyn Raines	10	1	0	7	0	0	0	0	0	3	1	0	0	0	0
38	GK	(Dominican Republic)	Xavier Valdez	0	0	0	0	0	0	0	0	0	0	0	0	0	0	0
40	DF	(United States)	Talen Maples (Note: Short term loan from Houston Dynamo 2)	2	0	0	0	0	0	0	0	0	2	0	0	0	0	0

Source: Season statistics and match reports in Competitions

=== Disciplinary record ===
No.	Pos.	Nat.	Player	Total		MLS		Playoffs		U.S. Open Cup		Leagues Cup	
No.	Pos.	Nat.	Player	Booked	Sent off (straight red)	Booked	Sent off (straight red)	Booked	Sent off (straight red)	Booked	Sent off (straight red)	Booked	Sent off (straight red)
2	DF	(Argentina)	Franco Escobar	16	0	11	0	2	0	1	0	2	0
4	DF	(United States)	Ethan Bartlow	4	0	4	0	0	0	0	0	0	0
5	DF	(United States)	Daniel Steres	2	0	2	0	0	0	0	0	0	0
6	MF	(Brazil)	Artur	8	0	6	0	0	0	1	0	1	0
7	FW	(Paraguay)	Iván Franco	3	0	3	0	0	0	0	0	0	0
8	MF	(Morocco)	Amine Bassi	2	1	1	1	1	0	0	0	0	0
9	FW	(Paraguay)	Sebastián Ferreira	1	0	1	0	0	0	0	0	0	0
11	FW	(United States)	Corey Baird	6	0	4	0	1	0	1	0	0	0
12	GK	(United States)	Steve Clark	5	0	4	0	1	0	0	0	0	0
16	MF	(Mexico)	Héctor Herrera	11	2	8	2	1	0	1	0	1	0
17	DF	(Zimbabwe)	Teenage Hadebe	2	0	1	0	0	0	1	0	0	0
18	FW	(Nigeria)	Ibrahim Aliyu	3	0	2	0	0	0	0	0	1	0
20	MF	(Panama)	Adalberto Carrasquilla	13	0	9	0	3	0	1	0	0	0
21	FW	(Colombia)	Nelson Quiñónes	5	1	5	1	0	0	0	0	0	0
22	DF	(United States)	Tate Schmitt	1	0	1	0	0	0	0	0	0	0
25	DF	(United States)	Griffin Dorsey	10	0	7	0	1	0	2	0	0	0
27	MF	(Colombia)	Luis Caicedo	7	0	6	0	0	0	1	0	0	0
28	DF	(Denmark)	Erik Sviatchenko	8	0	7	0	1	0	0	0	0	0
30	DF	(United States)	Chase Gasper	2	1	1	0	0	0	1	1	0	0
31	DF	(Brazil)	Micael	7	1	7	1	0	0	0	0	0	0
32	MF	(Poland)	Sebastian Kowalczyk	1	0	1	0	0	0	0	0	0	0
34	FW	(Iceland)	Thorleifur Úlfarsson	1	0	1	0	0	0	0	0	0	0

Source: Season statistics and match reports in Competitions

=== Clean sheets ===
No.	Nat.	Player	MLS	Playoffs	Open Cup	Leagues Cup	Total
12	(United States)	Steve Clark	12	1	0	1	14
13	(United States)	Andrew Tarbell	1	0	3	0	4
Total			13	1	3	1	18

Source: Player Stats and match reports in Competitions

== Honors and awards ==
=== MLS Team of the Matchday ===
Week	Player	Position	Ref.
4	(Mexico) Héctor Herrera	MF	
5	(Brazil) Artur	Bench	
7	(Argentina) Franco Escobar	DF	
7	(Morocco) Amine Bassi	FW	
9	(United States) Daniel Steres	DF	
11	(United States) Steve Clark	GK	
15	(Mexico) Héctor Herrera	MF	
18	(Argentina) Franco Escobar	DF	
18	(Mexico) Héctor Herrera	MF	
18	(United States) Brendan Burke	Coach	
20	(Iceland) Thorleifur Úlfarsson	FW	
20	(Mexico) Héctor Herrera	Bench	
24	(Mexico) Héctor Herrera	Bench	
27	(Argentina) Franco Escobar	DF	
27	(Panama) Adalberto Carrasquilla	Bench	
27	(United States) Corey Baird	Bench	
28	(Nigeria) Ibrahim Aliyu	Bench	
29	(Mexico) Héctor Herrera	MF	
33	(United States) Griffin Dorsey	DF	
33	(Mexico) Héctor Herrera	MF	
33	(United States) Ben Olsen	Coach	
37	(Colombia) Nelson Quiñónes	FW	
37	(Mexico) Héctor Herrera	Bench	
38	(United States) Griffin Dorsey	DF	
38	(Panama) Adalberto Carrasquilla	Bench	

=== Annual ===
Honor	Player	Position	Ref.
MLS All-Star	(Mexico) Héctor Herrera	MF	
MLS Best XI	(Mexico) Héctor Herrera	MF	

=== Dynamo team awards ===
MVP	Defensive Player of the Year	Newcomer of the Year	Young Player of the Year	Players' Player of the Year	Ref.
(Mexico) Héctor Herrera	(United States) Steve Clark	(Brazil) Artur	(Colombia) Nelson Quiñónes	(Mexico) Héctor Herrera	
