= 1988–89 Coupe de France =

Tournament details
- Country: France

Final positions
- Champions: Marseille
- Runners-up: Monaco

The Coupe de France 1988–89 was its 72nd edition. It was won by Olympique de Marseille.

== Round of 16 ==
Team 1	Agg.	Team 2	1st leg	2nd leg
FC Nantes (D1)	1–2	AS Monaco (D1)	0–0	1–2
Olympique de Marseille (D1)	3–2	Sporting Toulon Var (D1)	1–1	2–1
OGC Nice (D1)	1–5	AJ Auxerre (D1)	1–2	0–3
Lille OSC (D1)	2–3	FC Mulhouse (D2)	0–0	2–3
FC Sochaux-Montbéliard (D1)	2–1	Olympique Lyonnais (D2)	1–0	1–1
AS Beauvais (D2)	4–1	SM Caen (D1)	1–0	3–1
Paris SG (D1)	3–7	US Orléans (D2)	0–4	3–3
Stade Rennais (D2)	4–1	Angers SCO (D1)	1–0	3–1

== Quarter-finals ==
Team 1	Agg.	Team 2	1st leg	2nd leg
Olympique de Marseille (D1)	7–3	Stade Rennais (D2)	5–1	2–2
FC Sochaux-Montbéliard (D1)	3–2	FC Mulhouse (D2)	3–1	0–1
AS Beauvais (D2)	1–2	AJ Auxerre (D1)	1–2	0–0
US Orléans (D2)	4–5	AS Monaco (D1)	1–2	3–3

== Semi-finals ==
=== First leg ===
25 May 1989

Marseille (1)	2–0	Auxerre (1)
Papin 11'; Vercruysse 79'

Stade Vélodrome, Marseille
Attendance: 21,720
Referee: Claude Bouillet

26 May 1989

Monaco (1)	0–0 (a.e.t.)	Sochaux (1)

Stade Louis II, Monaco
Attendance: 4,642
Referee: Gérard Biguet

=== Second leg ===
3 June 1989

Auxerre (1)	0–1	Marseille (1)
		Allofs 19'

Stade de l'Abbé Deschamps, Auxerre
Attendance: 15,000
Referee: Michel Vautrot

Marseille won 3–0 on aggregate.

3 June 1989

Sochaux (1)	0–0 (a.e.t.)	Monaco (1)
Penalties
Croci (penalty scored); Hadžibegić (penalty scored); Paille (penalty missed); Baždarević (penalty scored)	3–5	(penalty scored) Amoros; (penalty scored) Hoddle; (penalty scored) Kurbos; (penalty scored) Fofana; (penalty scored) Sonor

Stade Auguste Bonal, Montbéliard
Attendance: 15,000
Referee: Michel Girard

0–0 on aggregate. Monaco won 5–3 on penalties.

== Final ==
10 June 1989
20:00

Marseille	4–3	Monaco
Papin 12', 22', 47'; Allofs 65'		Dib 31', 72'; Amoros 88' (pen.)

Parc des Princes, Paris
Attendance: 44,448
Referee: Joël Quiniou

== Topscorer ==
Jean-Pierre Papin (11 goals)
