= Nelson Quiñónes =

Colombian footballer (born 2002)

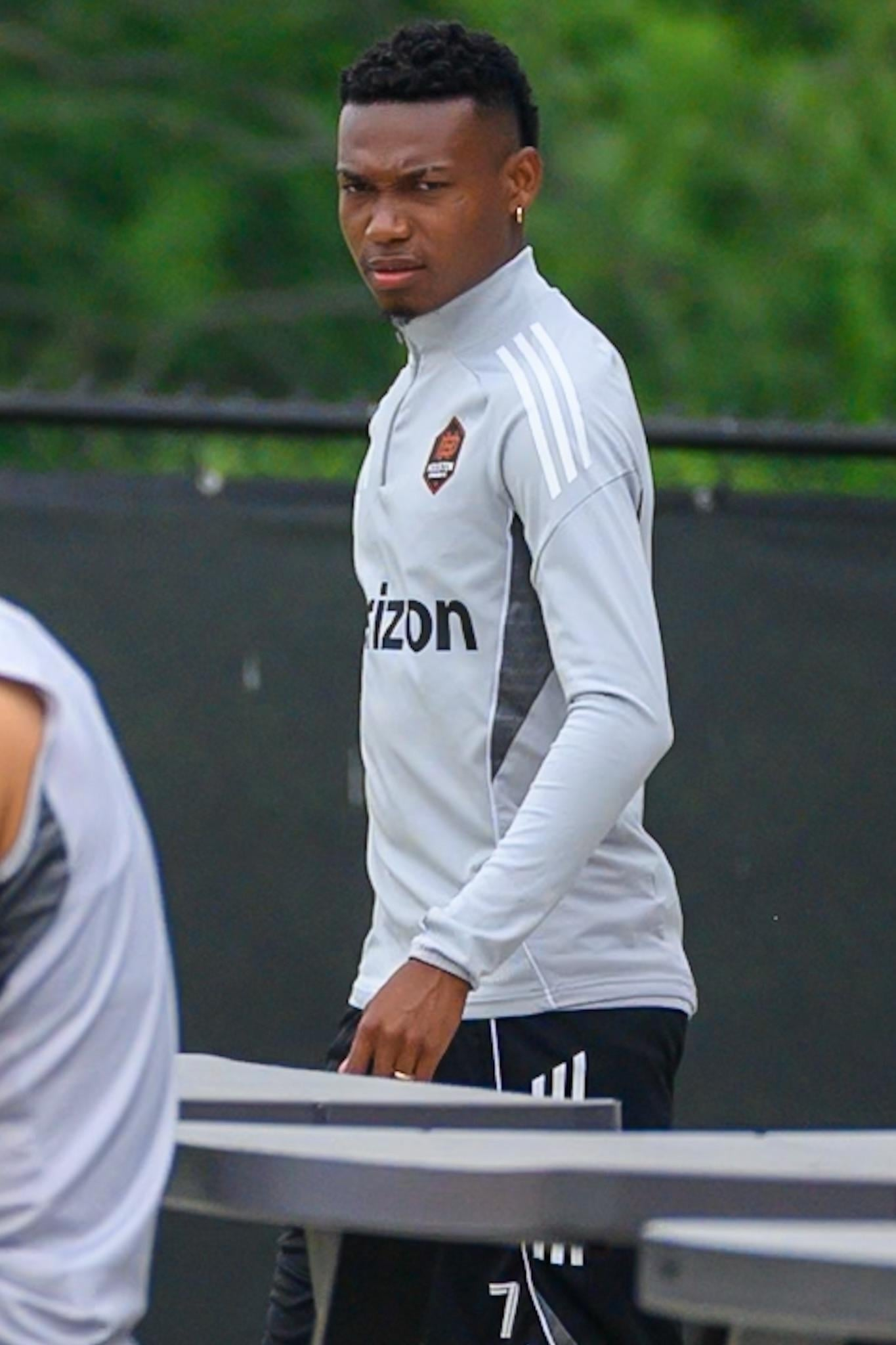
- Quiñónes in 2025

Personal information
- Full name: Nelson Giovany Quiñónes Iturre
- Date of birth: 20 August 2002 (age 24)
- Place of birth: Tumaco, Colombia
- Height: 1.75 m (5 ft 9 in)
- Position: Winger

Youth career
- –2021: Once Caldas

Senior career*
Years	Team	Apps	(Gls)
2021–2023	Once Caldas	29	(1)
2022–2023	→ Houston Dynamo (loan)	25	(1)
2023–2026	Houston Dynamo	12	(3)
2023	Houston Dynamo 2	1	(0)

International career^{‡}
2024	Colombia U23	3	(0)
- * Club domestic league appearances and goals as of 25 October 2025 ‡ National team caps and goals as of 29 February 2024

Nelson Giovany Quiñónes Iturre (born 20 August 2002) is a Colombian professional footballer who plays as a winger.

== Career ==
=== Once Caldas ===
Quiñónes came through the youth ranks of Once Caldas. On 24 July 2021, he made his first-team debut as an 18-year-old, coming off the bench in a 1–1 draw against Jaguares de Córdoba. Quiñónes scored his first goal for Once Caldas on 6 November, also picking up an assist in the match to give El Blanco a 2–1 win over Envigado. He finished the season with 11 appearances, 1 goal, and 1 assist as Once Caldas finished 17th in the Torneo Finalización table.

During the 2022 Torneo Apertura, Quiñónes made 15 appearances as Once Caldas finished 12th in the first stage standings. He also made 2 appearances in the Copa Colombia and 3 in the 2022 Torneo Finalización prior to going out on loan.

=== Houston Dynamo ===
On 27 July 2022, Quiñónes signed with Major League Soccer side Houston Dynamo on a year long loan with an option to make the deal permanent. He made his Dynamo debut on 27 August, coming on as a sub in a 2–1 loss to Minnesota United. Quiñónes ended the season with 8 appearances for the Dynamo, coming off the bench in each of Houston's final 8 games. The Dynamo finished 13th in the Western Conference, failing to qualify for the playoffs.

On 6 June 2023 Quiñónes scored his first goal for Houston to help the Dynamo to a 4–1 victory over the Chicago Fire in the U.S. Open Cup quarterfinals. Four days late he scored his first career MLS goal in a 4–0 win against Los Angeles FC. On 13 July Houston exercised their option to make his stay at the club permanent. The official fee was undisclosed but was reportedly $1,250,000, with Once Caldas maintaining a 25% sell-on clause. He was named to his first ever MLS Team of the Matchday following a 2-goal and 1 assist performance in a 5–1 win over the Colorado Rapids on 7 October. Quiñónes finished the regular season with 4 goals and 2 assists in 28 regular season appearance, helping the Dynamo finish 4th in the West to qualify for the playoffs for the first time in 6 years. He had 1 assist in 5 playoff games to help Houston reach the Conference Finals, where they fell 2–0 to LAFC. The highlight of the season was winning the 2023 Open Cup, with Quiñónes drawing a foul in the box to set up the decisive penalty, which was converted by Amine Bassi, in a 2–1 win over Inter Miami in the final. Following the season he was named Dynamo Young Player of the Year.

In February 2024 Quiñónes suffered a knee injury why playing with the Colombia U23 team that forced him to miss the entire 2024 season.

On 18 March 2026, Quiñónes was waived by Houston.

== Career statistics ==
=== Club ===
As of match played 29 February 2024

Appearances and goals by club, season and competition
Club	Season	League			National cup (Note: Includes Copa Colombia and U.S. Open Cup)		League Cup (Note: Includes MLS Cup Playoffs)		Continental		Total	
Club	Season	Division	Apps	Goals	Apps	Goals	Apps	Goals	Apps	Goals	Apps	Goals
Once Caldas	2021	Primera A	11	1	0	0	—		—		11	1
Once Caldas	2022	Primera A	18	0	2	0	—		—		20	0
Once Caldas	Total		29	1	2	0	0	0	0	0	31	1
Houston Dynamo (loan)	2022	Major League Soccer	8	0	0	0	—		—		8	0
Houston Dynamo	2023 (Note: Made total 20 appearances and scored 2 goals while on loan with Houston during season)	Major League Soccer	28	4	5	1	5	0	3 (Note: Appearances in Leagues Cup)	0	41	5
Houston Dynamo	2024	Major League Soccer	0	0	0	0	0	0	0	0	0	0
Houston Dynamo	Total		36	4	0	0	0	0	0	0	49	5
Houston Dynamo 2	2023	MLS Next Pro	1	0	0	0	0	0	0	0	1	0
Career total			66	5	7	1	5	0	3	0	81	6

== Honors ==
Houston Dynamo

- U.S. Open Cup: 2023

Individual

- Dynamo Young Player of the Year: 2023
