= Henryk Kasperczak =

Polish footballer (born 1946)

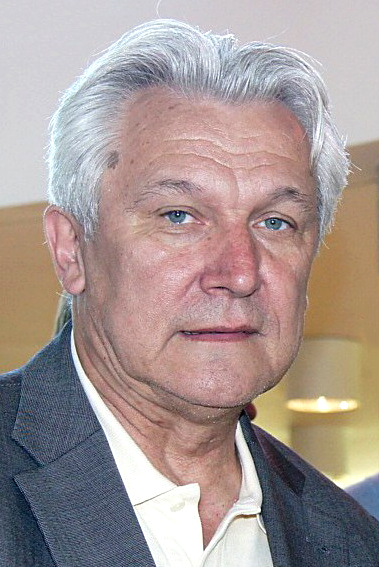
- Kasperczak in 2012

Personal information
- Full name: Henryk Wojciech Kasperczak
- Date of birth: 10 July 1946 (age 80)
- Place of birth: Zabrze, Poland
- Height: 1.80 m (5 ft 11 in)
- Position: Midfielder

Senior career*
Years	Team	Apps	(Gls)
1959–1965	Stal Zabrze		
1965–1966	Stal Mielec	0	(0)
1966–1968	Legia Warszawa	0	(0)
1968–1978	Stal Mielec	209	(37)
1978–1979	Metz	55	(11)

International career
1973–1978	Poland	61	(5)

Managerial career
- 1979–1984: Metz
- 1984–1987: Saint-Étienne
- 1987–1988: Strasbourg
- 1989–1990: Racing Club de Paris
- 1990–1992: Montpellier
- 1993: Lille
- 1993–1994: Ivory Coast
- 1994–1998: Tunisia
- 1998: Bastia
- 1999–2000: Al Wasl
- 2000: Morocco
- 2000–2001: Shenyang Haishi
- 2001–2002: Mali
- 2002–2004: Wisła Kraków
- 2006–2008: Senegal
- 2008–2009: Górnik Zabrze
- 2010: Wisła Kraków
- 2010–2011: Kavala
- 2013–2015: Mali
- 2015–2017: Tunisia
Medal record
Men's football
Representing Poland (as player)
FIFA World Cup
Third place	1974 West Germany
Olympic Games
Silver medal – second place	1976 Montréal
Representing Ivory Coast (as manager)
Africa Cup of Nations
Third place	1994 Tunisia
Representing Tunisia (as manager)
Runner-up	1996 South Africa
- * Club domestic league appearances and goals

Henryk Wojciech Kasperczak (born 10 July 1946) is a Polish former professional football manager and player.

As a player, Kasperczak took part in two FIFA World Cups with Poland, achieving third place in 1974, as well as a silver medal at the 1976 Summer Olympics in Montreal, Quebec, Canada. In 1976 and 1977, he was the winner of the Polish Footballer of the Year Award conferred by the Piłka Nożna football weekly.

As a manager, Kasperczak enjoyed most success in the African Cup of Nations, securing second place with Tunisia in 1996, third with Ivory Coast (1994) and fourth with Mali (2002).

== Club career ==
Kasperczak was born in Zabrze. With Stal Mielec, Kasperczak won two Ekstraklasa title in his native Poland. He had also played for the reserve team of Legia Warsaw, before ending his career in FC Metz.

== International career ==
He played for Poland at the 1974 FIFA World Cup, securing third place; at the 1976 Summer Olympics, where the team won the silver medal, and at the 1978 FIFA World Cup.

== Coaching career ==
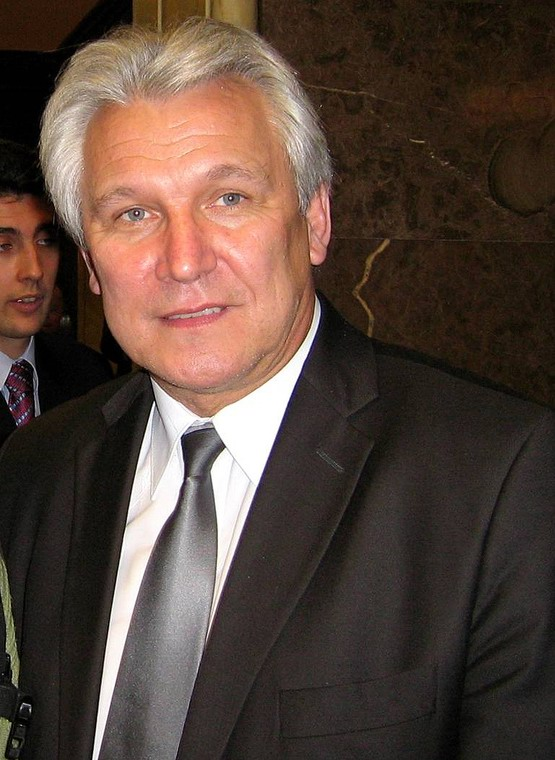
Kasperczak in 2007

Kasperczak spent the first fifteen years (1978–1993) of his coaching career in France, managing FC Metz, AS Saint-Étienne, Racing Strasbourg, Racing Club de Paris, Montpellier HSC and Lille OSC. His biggest success was winning Coupe de France with FC Metz in 1984.

Next, Kasperczak managed two African national teams: first, Ivory Coast (1993–1994), achieving third place in the 1994 African Cup of Nations, and later Tunisia (1994–1998), which finished second in the 1996 Cup. Kasperczak also coached Tunisia at the 1996 Summer Olympics and the 1998 FIFA World Cup in France.

During the tournament, Kasperczak was fired and replaced by Ali Selmi, after Tunisia lost the chance to pass the group stage, losing to England (0–2) and Colombia (0–1).

Later, Kasperczak managed SC Bastia (1998), Al Wasl FC (1999–2000), Morocco national team (2000), Shenyang Haishi (2000–2001) and Mali national team (2001–2002). Mali won the fourth place at the 2002 African Cup of Nations under his coaching.

In 2002, Kasperczak came back to his native Poland, and spend the next three years as head coach of Wisła Kraków. Wisła won three league titles under his coaching.

In 2006, Kaspeczak began managing Senegal (2006–2008), however he quit his post during the 2008 African Cup of Nations following a poor run of results which saw them win one point in two games in a group they had been expected to win.

On 16 September 2008, he took over as manager of Górnik Zabrze. He left Górnik Zabrze on 3 June 2009, when the club was officially relegated from Ekstraklasa to I liga, the second division.

On 15 March 2010, Wisła Kraków reached an agreement with Kasperczak to appoint him as the new manager.

== Career statistics ==
=== International ===
Appearances and goals by national team and year
National team	Year	Apps	Goals
Poland	1973	15	2
Poland	1974	11	1
Poland	1975	9	1
Poland	1976	7	0
Poland	1977	11	1
Poland	1978	8	0
Total		61	5

Scores and results list Poland's goal tally first, score column indicates score after each Kasperczak goal.

List of international goals scored by Henryk Kasperczak
No.	Date	Venue	Opponent	Score	Result	Competition
1	20 March 1973	Łódź, Poland	United States	3–0	4–0	Friendly
2	3 August 1973	Chicago, United States	United States	1–0	1–0	Friendly
3	9 October 1974	Poznań, Poland	Finland	1–0	3–0	UEFA Euro 1976 qualifying
4	8 October 1975	Łódź, Poland	Hungary	2–1	4–2	Friendly
5	10 June 1977	Lima, Peru	Peru	3–1	3–1	Friendly

== Honours ==
=== Player ===
Stal Mielec

- Ekstraklasa: 1972–73, 1975–76
- UEFA Intertoto Cup: 1971

Poland

- Olympic silver medal: 1976
- FIFA World Cup third place: 1974

Individual

- Piłka Nożna Polish Footballer of the Year: 1976
- Polish Football Association National Team of the Century: 1919–2019

=== Manager ===
FC Metz

- Coupe de France: 1983–84

RC Strasbourg

- Ligue 2: 1987–88

RC Paris

- Coupe de France runner-up: 1989–90

Ivory Coast

- African Cup of Nations third place: 1994

Tunisia

- African Cup of Nations runner-up : 1996

Mali

- African Cup of Nations fourth place: 2002

Wisła Kraków

- Ekstraklasa: 2002–03, 2003–04, 2004–05
- Polish Cup: 2001–02, 2002–03

Individual

- Polish Coach of the Year: 2002

== See also ==
- National team managers with 100 or more matches
