= Philippe Thys =

Philippe Thys is a name. People with that name include:

- Philippe Thys (cyclist) (1889–1971), Belgian cyclist
- Philippe Thys (footballer) (born 1959), French footballer
