= Iván Franco =

Paraguayan footballer (born 2000)

Personal information
- Full name: Iván René Franco Díaz
- Date of birth: 16 April 2000 (age 26)
- Place of birth: Ybycuí, Paraguay
- Height: 1.65 m (5 ft 5 in)
- Position: Attacking midfielder

Team information
- Current team: Libertad
- Number: 18

Youth career
- Libertad

Senior career*
Years	Team	Apps	(Gls)
2018–	Libertad	212	(29)
2023	→ Houston Dynamo (loan)	26	(3)

International career^{‡}
2018–2019	Paraguay U20	3	(0)
2019–	Paraguay	1	(0)
- * Club domestic league appearances and goals as of 27 May 2026 ‡ National team caps and goals as of 10 September 2019

Iván René Franco Díaz (born 16 April 2000) is a Paraguayan footballer who plays for Libertad, as an attacking midfielder.

== Club career ==
Born in Ybycuí, Franco joined Libertad's youth setup after being spotted at Football Dreams. Promoted to the main squad for the 2018 season, he made his professional – and Primera División – debut for Libertad on 2 February of that year, starting in a 2–2 away draw against Sportivo Luqueño. Franco scored his first professional goal on 4 March, netting his team's second in a 4–1 away routing of 3 de Febrero. Nine days later, he made his Copa Libertadores debut by starting in a 2–0 away win against Atlético Tucumán. On November 4 Franco scored in the 90+1st minute to give Gumarelo a 2–1 win vs Club Nacional. Franco finished the season with 33 appearances and 7 goals across the Primera División Apertura and Clausura seasons, with Libertad finishing 3rd in both. He contributed with five appearances in Copa Libertadores, as his side were knocked out by eventual runners up Boca Juniors in the round of 16. Franco also made an appearance in the first ever edition of the Copa Paraguay.

On 9 March 2019, Franco scored his first and second goals of the 2019 season, giving Libertad a 2–2 draw with Sportivo Luqueño. On 19 October, he scored a minute into stoppage time to rescue a 1–0 win over Sol de América. Franco ended the Primera División season with 11 goals and 5 assists in 37 appearances across both halves, with Libertad finishing 3rd in the Apertura and 2nd in the Clausura. He helped Gumarelo win the 2019 Copa Paraguay, making 4 appearances and scoring 3 goals during the tournament.

Franco scored his first goal of the 2020 season on 7 March, helping Libertad to a 5–1 win over Club General Díaz. Three days later he scored his first career Copa Libertadores goal to give Libertad a 3–2 win against Caracas. On 18 March 2020, Franco signed a contract extension with Libertad until 2025. He ended the season with 1 goals and 1 assist in 22 Primera División appearances (including an appearance in the Clausura playoffs), plus 3 appearances and 1 goal in Copa Libertadores.

Franco helped Libertad to the 2021 Apertura title, making 10 appearances and recording an assist. They were unable to repeat as champs in the Clausura season, finishing 4th with Franco scoring once in 9 games. He made 4 appearances and had 2 assists in Copa Libertadores, as well as 9 appearances and an assist in Copa Sudamericana, helping Libertad reach the semifinals where they lost 5–1 on aggregate to Red Bull Bragantino. On 14 November, Franco injured his knee in a Copa Paraguay match vs Olimpia, ending his season.

After 2 arthroscopic surgeries to repair his meniscus, Franco made his return to the pitch on 30 April 2022, coming on as a substitute in a 1–0 win vs General Caballero JLM. Franco had 8 appearances and 2 assists in the Apertura, helping Libertad win the title. He finished the Clausura with 2 assists in 14 games as Libertad finished 4th. Franco also made 4 appearances and had an assist in Copa Libertadores and played twice in Copa Paraguay. Following the 2022 season, Franco asked the club for a transfer, hoping a change in scenery would help him find his form.

On 7 January 2023, it was announced that Franco would join Major League Soccer side Houston Dynamo on loan for their 2023 season. He made his Dynamo debut on 25 February, getting the start in a 2–1 loss to FC CIncinnati in the opening match of the season.

== International career ==
On 21 December 2018, Franco was called up by Paraguay under-20s for the 2019 South American U-20 Championship.

On 10 September 2019, Franco made his senior international debut with the Paraguay national team in a 4–2 friendly win away to Jordan.

== Style of play ==
Franco has been praised for the ability and quickness of thought to play as a playmaker in the ‘number 10’ role.

== Career statistics ==
As of 27 February 2023

Appearances and goals by club, season and competition
Club	Season	League			Cup (Note: Includes Copa Paraguay and U.S. Open Cup)		Continental		Other		Total	
Club	Season	Division	Apps	Goals	Apps	Goals	Apps	Goals	Apps	Goals	Apps	Goals
Libertad	2018	Primera División	34	7	1	0	5 (Note: Appearance(s) in Copa Libertadores.)	0	—		40	7
Libertad	2019	Primera División	37	11	4	3	3	0	—		44	14
Libertad	2020	Primera División	22	1	—		3	1	—		25	2
Libertad	2021	Primera División	19	1	3	2	13 (Note: Four appearances in Copa Libertadores, nine appearances in Copa Sudamericana)	0	—		35	3
Libertad	2022	Primera División	22	0	2	0	4	0	—		28	0
Libertad	Total		134	20	10	5	28	1	0	0	172	26
Houston Dynamo (loan)	2023	MLS	1	0	0	0	0	0	0	0	1	0
Career total			135	20	10	5	28	1	0	0	173	26

== Honours ==
Libertad

- Primera División: 2021 Apertura, 2022 Apertura
- Copa Paraguay: 2019
