= Amine Bassi =

Footballer (born 1997)

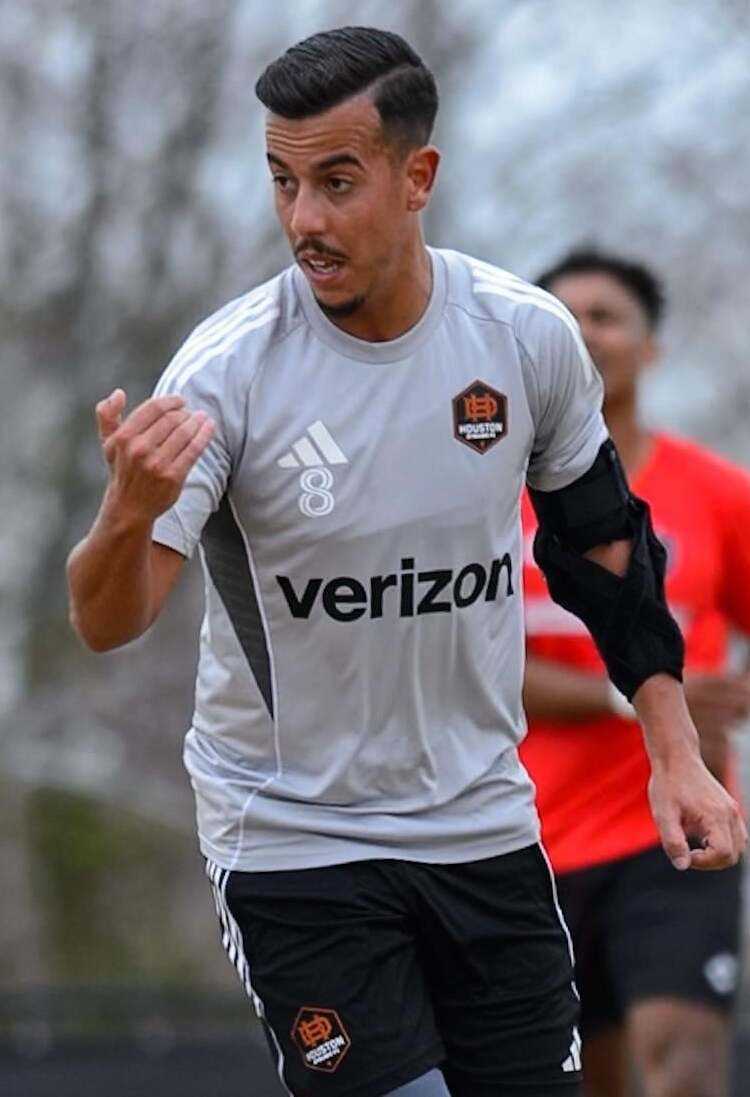
- Bassi in 2025

Personal information
- Date of birth: 27 November 1997 (age 28)
- Place of birth: Bezons, France
- Height: 1.73 m (5 ft 8 in)
- Position: Midfielder

Team information
- Current team: Panetolikos
- Number: 10

Youth career
- US Bezons
- 2012–2014: Racing
- 2014–2015: Épinal
- 2015–2017: Nancy

Senior career*
Years	Team	Apps	(Gls)
2015–2018	Nancy II	46	(11)
2017–2021	Nancy	106	(24)
2021–2023	Metz II	6	(1)
2021–2023	Metz	9	(0)
2022	→ Barnsley (loan)	15	(2)
2023–2025	Houston Dynamo	88	(15)
2026–	Panetolikos	4	(0)

International career^{‡}
2017	Morocco U21	1	(0)
- * Club domestic league appearances and goals as of 13 September 2026 ‡ National team caps and goals as of 13 October 2017

Amine Bassi (born 27 November 1997) is a professional footballer who plays as a midfielder for Greek Super League club Panetolikos. Born in France, he represents Morocco internationally.

== Club career ==
=== Nancy ===
Bassi began his professional career with AS Nancy Lorraine, joining from the youth team of Épinal in 2015. During his first season with the club, he played with the reserve side in Championnat de France Amateur 2, the 5th tier of French football, where he made 21 appearances and scored 5 goals.

Bassi made his first team debut in a 3–0 Ligue 1 loss to Monaco on 6 May 2017. He finished the 2016–17 season with 1 first team appearances as Nancy were relegated to Ligue 2 after finishing 19th. He also made 22 appearances and scored 6 goals for Nancy II. On 9 May, Bassi agreed to a professional contract with Nancy, with the deal running until June 2020.

Bassi established himself in the first team during the 2017–18 season. On 8 September 2017 he scored his first and second goals for Nancy the first team and picked up an assist to give ASNL a 3–0 win over Valenciennes. Bassi ended the season with 7 goals and 7 assists in 33 Ligue 2 appearances as Nancy finished 17th, 2 points above the relegation playoff. He also had a goal in 3 Coupe de France appearances and an assist in a Coupe de la Ligue game.

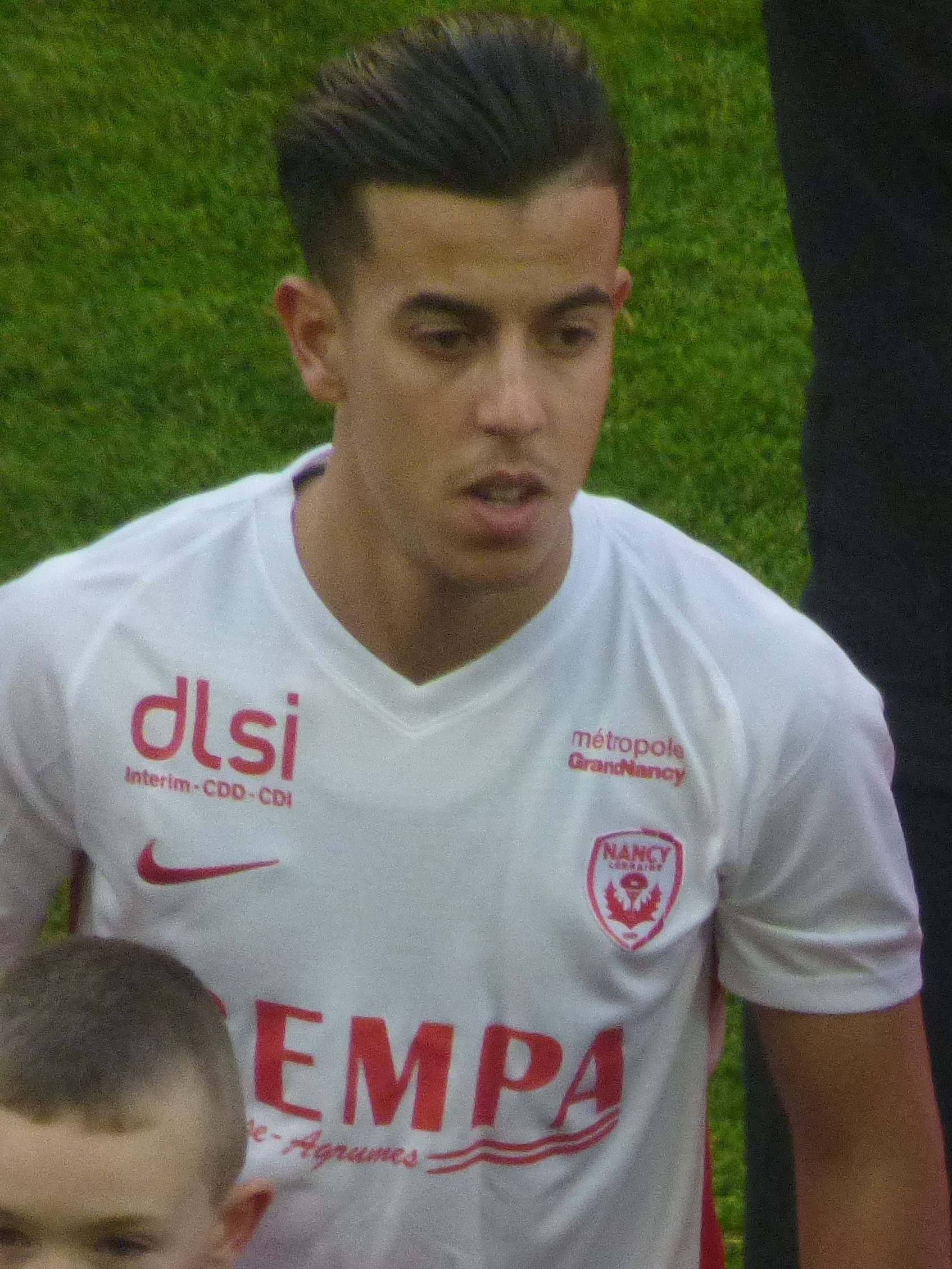
Bassi in 2019

Bassi started the 2018–19 season slowly, but picked up form in the new year. He scored his first goal of the campaign on 19 January in a 2–1 loss to RC Lens. He scored a brace on 22 February to give ASNL a 3–1 win over Gazélec Ajaccio. On 10 May, in the penultimate match of the season, Bassi scored to give Nancy a 1–0 win over Derby Lorrain rivals Metz, who had already secured the Ligue 2 title. The result guaranteed ASNL avoided relegation. Bassi finished the Ligue 2 season with 31 appearances, 6 goals and 2 assists with Nancy finishing in 14th in the table. During the season, Bassi agreed to extend his contract until June 2021.

In the 2019 summer transfer window, Bassi wanted to join Metz and reunite with former Nancy coach Vincent Hognon. Metz made an offer of around €1.5 million, but ASNL refused to sell to their rival. While Bassi tried to force a move, he trained with the reserves and didn't play in Nancy's first 6 games of the Ligue 2 season or in their first 2 Coupe de la Ligue. After no clubs met Nancy's asking price, Bassi returned to the first team. He made his first appearance of the season in matchweek 7, getting the start in a 1–1 draw with Guingamp on 13 September. A week later Bassi recorded his first goal and assist of the season to help ASNL beat Chambly Oise 3–0. In March 2020, the FFF ended the season due to the COVID-19 pandemic. Bassi ended the season with 22 appearances, 4 goals, and 3 assists in Ligue 2, with Nancy 12th in the table after 28 matches played. He also had 1 goal and 2 assists in 4 Coupe de France appearances.

Bassi scored 7 goals and had 3 assists in 19 appearances during the 2020–21 season, all in Ligue 2, helping Nancy finish 8th in the table.

=== Metz ===
On 19 May 2021, he signed on a free transfer with Nancy's rivals Metz, agreeing to a four-year contract effective from 1 July. He made his debut for Les Grenats on 16 August, getting the start and playing an hour in a 2–0 loss to Nantes. Bassi made 6 first team appearances for Metz prior to going on loan. Metz would go on to finish the season in 19th and be relegated.

==== Loan to Barnsley ====
On 31 January 2022, Bassi joined EFL Championship side Barnsley on loan for the remainder of the 2021–22 season. He made his debut for Barnsley on 2 February, coming off the bench in a 1–0 loss to Cardiff City. On 26 February he scored his first goals for Barnsley when he scored twice and recorded an assist to give Barnsley a 3–2 win over Middlesbrough. The loan was terminated on 26 April with three games left in the season and Barnsley already relegated. Bassi made 15 appearances, scored 2 goals, and had 5 assists in league play as Barnsley finished 24th in the Championship.

Bassi made 4 appearances for Metz in the 2022–23 season prior to being sold.

=== Houston Dynamo ===
On 23 January 2023, Bassi was sold to MLS club Houston Dynamo for a reported $1.5 million transfer fee. He made his Dynamo debut on 4 March, coming off the bench in a 3–0 loss to the New England Revolution. Bassi scored his first goal for the Dynamo on 18 March to help Houston beat Austin FC 2–0. On 8 April Bassi scored a brace in a 3–0 win over the LA Galaxy. His first goal in the match was a penalty kick, making him the first player in MLS history to score a penalty kick in 4 straight games.

== International career ==
Bassi was born in France and is of Moroccan descent. He made his debut for the Morocco U21s in a friendly 4–0 loss to the Italy U21 on 11 October 2017.

== Career statistics ==
As of match played 12 July 2023

Appearances and goals by club, season and competition
Club	Season	League			National Cup (Note: Includes Coupe de France, FA Cup, and U.S. Open Cup)		League Cup (Note: Includes Coupe de la Ligue, EFL Cup, and MLS Cup Playoffs)		continental		Total	
Club	Season	Division	Apps	Goals	Apps	Goals	Apps	Goals	Apps	Goals	Apps	Goals
Nancy II	2015–16	CFA 2	21	5	—		—		—		23	5
Nancy II	2016–17	CFA 2	22	6	—		—		—		22	6
Nancy II	2017–18	Championnat National 3	0	0	—		—		—		0	0
Nancy II	2018–19	Championnat National 3	3	0	—		—		—		3	0
Nancy II	Total		46	11	0	0	0	0	0	0	46	11
Nancy	2016–17	Ligue 1	1	0	0	0	0	0	—		1	0
Nancy	2017–18	Ligue 2	33	7	3	1	1	0	—		37	8
Nancy	2018–19	Ligue 2	31	6	2	0	2	0	—		35	6
Nancy	2019–20	Ligue 2	22	4	4	1	1	0	—		27	5
Nancy	2020–21	Ligue 2	19	7	0	0	—		—		19	7
Nancy	Total		106	24	9	2	4	0	0	0	119	26
Metz II	2021–22	Championnat National 2	2	1	—		—		—		2	1
Metz II	2022–23	Championnat National 2	4	0	—		—		—		4	0
Metz II	Total		6	1	0	0	0	0	0	0	6	1
Metz	2021–22	Ligue 1	5	0	1	0	—		—		6	0
Metz	2022–23	Ligue 2	4	0	0	0	—		—		4	0
Metz	Total		9	0	1	0	0	0	0	0	10	0
Barnsley (loan)	2021–22	EFL Championship	15	2	1	0	0	0	—		16	2
Houston Dynamo	2023	MLS	19	8	0	0	0	0	0	0	15	8
Career total			201	46	11	2	4	0	0	0	212	48
