= Philippe Thys (footballer) =

French footballer (born 1959)

Personal information
- Date of birth: 30 August 1959 (age 67)
- Place of birth: Paris, France
- Height: 1.72 m (5 ft 8 in)
- Position: Full-back

Senior career*
Years	Team	Apps	(Gls)
1979–1980	INF Vichy		
1980–1985	Metz	151	(2)
1985–1987	RC Paris	54	(2)
1987–1988	Nantes	35	(1)
1988–1990	Marseille	49	(2)
1990–1993	Toulon	84	(2)
1993–1995	Strasbourg	44	(0)
1995–1997	Marseille Endoume		
Total		417+	(9+)

Managerial career
- 1997–1998: Toulon (youth)
- 2017–2019: Tubize
- * Club domestic league appearances and goals

Philippe Thys (born 30 August 1959) is a French former professional footballer who played as a full-back. Across a fifteen-year professional career, he made 392 Division 1 appearances and twenty-five Division 2 appearances.

== Post-playing career ==
Following his retirement, Thys worked as a youth coach from 1997 to 1998 at his former club Toulon. He then became a scout, working for Strasbourg from 2001 to 2006 and Monaco from 2006 to 2010. In 2014, Thys joined Tubize as the head of recruitment. In 2017, he became Tubize's manager, a position he stayed in until 2019.

== Honours ==
Metz

- Coupe de France: 1983–84

RC Paris

- Division 2: 1985–86

Marseille

- Division 1: 1988–89, 1989–90
- Coupe de France: 1988–89

Strasbourg

- Coupe de France runner-up: 1994–95
