= Fernando Zappia =

Argentine footballer

Personal information
- Date of birth: 22 February 1955 (age 71)
- Place of birth: Buenos Aires, Argentina
- Height: 1.76 m (5 ft 9 in)
- Position: Defender

Senior career*
Years	Team	Apps	(Gls)
1975–1976	River Plate		
1977	Lanús		
1978–1980	Wacker Innsbruck		
1980–1983	Nancy	98	(0)
1983–1987	Metz	140	(1)
1987–1989	Lille	65	(0)
1989–1990	Nancy	33	(1)
1990–1992	Atlanta		
- * Club domestic league appearances and goals

Fernando Zappia (born 22 February 1955) is an Argentine former professional footballer who played as a defender.

Born in Buenos Aires, Zappia started his career with River Plate after a short spell with Lanús he joined Austrian side Wacker Innsbruck in 1978.

From 1980 until 1990 Zappia played in France for a number of teams, he had two spells with Nancy and also played for Metz and Lille.

Late in his career he returned to Argentina to play for Atlanta in the lower leagues.

== Honours ==
Metz

- Coupe de France: 1983–84
