= Alain Colombo =

French footballer (born 1961)

Personal information
- Date of birth: 5 April 1961 (age 65)
- Place of birth: Mont-Saint-Martin, France
- Height: 1.86 m (6 ft 1 in)
- Position: Defender

Senior career*
Years	Team	Apps	(Gls)
1979–1987	Metz	117	(2)
1987–1990	Chamois Niortais	57	(0)
1990–1993	Gueugnon	60	(0)
1993–1995	Aris Bonnevoie		
- * Club domestic league appearances and goals

Alain Colombo (born 5 April 1961) is a French former professional footballer. He played as a defender. He played for Metz in the Coupe de France Final 1984.
