= Aliyu Ibrahim =

Nigerian footballer

Personal information
- Place of birth: Owerri, Nigeria
- Height: 1.71 m (5 ft 7 1/2 in)
- Position: Forward

Team information
- Current team: Nasarawa United

Aliyu Ibrahim is a Nigerian professional footballer, who plays as a forward for Nasarawa United F.C.

== International career ==
In January 2014, coach Stephen Keshi, invited him to be included in the Nigeria 23-man team for the 2014 African Nations Championship. He helped the team to a third-place finish after Nigeria beat Zimbabwe 1–0.
