= Philippe Hinschberger =

French football player and manager (born 1959)

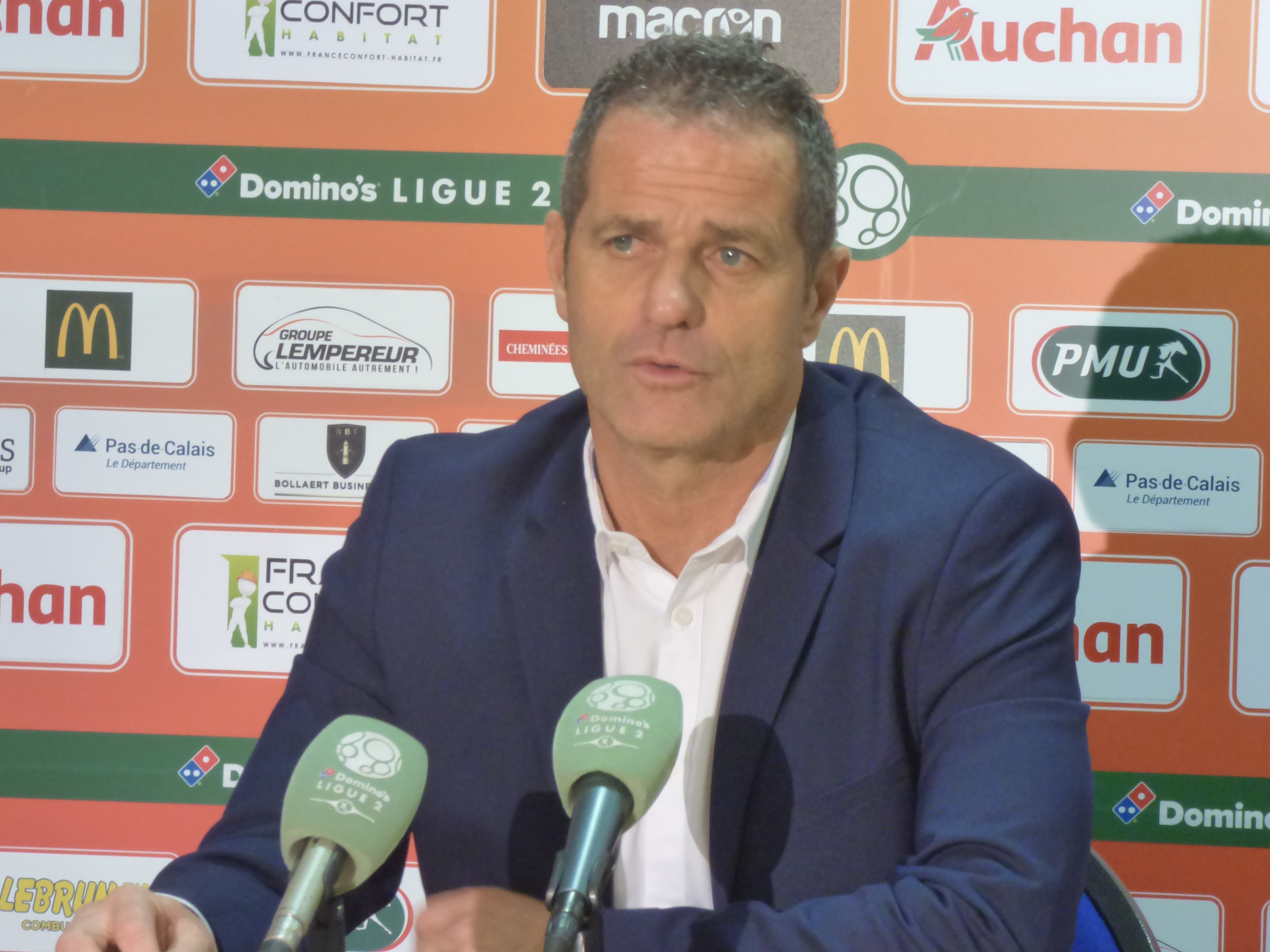
- Hinschberger with Grenoble in 2018

Personal information
- Date of birth: 19 November 1959 (age 66)
- Place of birth: Algrange, France
- Position: Midfielder

Team information
- Current team: Chamois Niortais (Manager)

Senior career*
Years	Team	Apps	(Gls)
1977–1992	Metz	428	(57)

International career
1982	France U21	2	(0)

Managerial career
- 1997–2001: Louhans-Cuiseaux
- 2001–2004: Chamois Niortais
- 2004–2005: Le Havre
- 2005–2007: Chamois Niortais
- 2007–2014: Laval
- 2014: Créteil
- 2015–2017: Metz
- 2018–2021: Grenoble
- 2021–2023: Amiens
- 2023–2024: Chamois Niortais
- * Club domestic league appearances and goals

Philippe Hinschberger (born 19 November 1959) is a French football manager and former player.

== Playing career ==
Hinschberger was a one-club man, having spent his entire career with Metz. He was capped twice with France under-21s and once by France B.

== Managerial career ==
After retiring as a player, Hinschberger managed CS Louhans-Cuiseaux, Chamois Niortais and Le Havre; he was the manager of Laval from 2007 to 2014. Hinschberger was manager of Créteil in 2014. He joined Metz in December 2015, and was sacked on 22 October 2017, after nine defeats in ten games at the start of the 2017–18 season.

On 17 June 2021, Hinschberger left Grenoble to join fellow Ligue 2 side Amiens. He was sacked in April 2023.

He became manager of Chamois Niortais in July 2023.

== Honours ==
Metz

- Coupe de France: 1983–84, 1987–88
- Coupe de la Ligue: 1985–86
