= Patrick Delamontagne =

French footballer (born 1957)

Personal information
- Date of birth: 18 June 1957 (age 69)
- Place of birth: La Bouéxière, France
- Position: Midfielder

Youth career
- 1970–1973: La Bouéxière

Senior career*
Years	Team	Apps	(Gls)
1973–1977	Rennes		
1977–1980	Laval		
1980–1982	Nancy		
1982–1984	Monaco	36	(1)
1984–1987	Laval		
1987–1988	Marseille	26	(2)
1988–1991	Rennes		

International career
1981–1987	France	3	(0)
- * Club domestic league appearances and goals

Patrick Delamontagne (born 18 June 1957) is a French former professional footballer who played as a midfielder. He is regarded as one of the greatest players to have played for Rennes, as well as one of the greatest ever Breton players. He is the father of the professional golfer François Delamontagne.

== International career ==
- 15 May 1981, Paris: France-Brazil (1–3), friendly match.
- 31 August 1982, Paris: France-Poland (0–4), friendly match.
- 16 June 1987, Oslo: France-Norway (0–0), 1988 UEFA European Football Championship qualifying match.
