= Tony Kurbos =

Footballer (born 1960)

Zvonko Kurbos
Personal information
- Date of birth: 20 October 1960 (age 66)
- Place of birth: Maribor, FPR Yugoslavia
- Height: 1.73 m (5 ft 8 in)
- Position: Forward

Youth career
- 1972–1979: Stuttgarter Kickers

Senior career*
Years	Team	Apps	(Gls)
1979–1981	Stuttgarter Kickers	24	(3)
1981–1982	Tongeren	27	(5)
1982–1985	Metz	96	(38)
1985–1986	Saint-Étienne	28	(10)
1986–1987	Mulhouse	31	(21)
1987–1989	Nice	40	(6)
1989	Monaco	5	(0)
1989–1990	Nice	15	(1)
1990–1991	Dunkerque	17	(0)
Total		283	(84)
- * Club domestic league appearances and goals

Zvonko "Toni" Kurbos, better known as Tony Kurbos (born 20 October 1960) is a German-French former professional footballer who played as a forward. He scored 84 goals in his professional career.

He scored a hat-trick against Barcelona in Camp Nou, eliminating them in the first round of the 1984–85 Cup Winners' Cup with Metz. The match was described in the British Guardian as the biggest European football upset ever.

In that same year, Kurbos assisted and scored in extra time of the Coupe de France final. Metz won the match against Monaco 2–0, claiming their first major trophy ever.

== Honours ==
Metz

- Coupe de France: 1983–84

Individual

- Ligue 2 top scorer: 1986–87
