= Jean-Philippe Rohr =

French footballer (born 1961)

Personal information
- Date of birth: 23 December 1961 (age 64)
- Place of birth: Metz, France
- Height: 1.74 m (5 ft 9 in)
- Position: Midfielder

Senior career*
Years	Team	Apps	(Gls)
1979–1985	Metz	109	(11)
1985–1986	Nice	8	(0)
1986–1988	Monaco	46	(3)
1988–1991	Nice	74	(5)

International career
1984	France Olympic team		
1987	France	1	(0)
Medal record
Men's football
Representing France
Gold medal – first place	1984 Los Angeles	Team competition
- * Club domestic league appearances and goals

Jean-Philippe Rohr (born 23 December 1961) is a French former professional footballer who played as a midfielder. He was a member of the French squad that won the gold medal at the 1984 Summer Olympics in Los Angeles, California.
