= Michel Ettore =

French footballer (born 1957)

Personal information
- Date of birth: 14 October 1957 (age 69)
- Place of birth: Amnéville, France
- Position: Goalkeeper

Senior career*
Years	Team	Apps	(Gls)
1973–1988	FC Metz	296	(0)
1988–1989	Quimper		
1989–1990	Toulon		
- * Club domestic league appearances and goals

Michel Ettore (born 14 October 1957) is a French former professional footballer.

== Club career ==
He spent most of his career with FC Metz.
