= Luc Sonor =

French footballer (born 1962)

Personal information
- Date of birth: 15 September 1962 (age 64)
- Place of birth: Basse-Terre, Guadeloupe
- Height: 1.81 m (5 ft 11 in)
- Position: Centre-back

Youth career
- 1976–1979: Sedan

Senior career*
Years	Team	Apps	(Gls)
1979–1986	Metz	144	(6)
1986–1995	Monaco	248	(4)
1997	Saint-Denis		
1997–1998	Ayr United	9	(0)
1999	Colmar		
2000	AS Corbeil-Essones		

International career
1987–1989	France	9	(0)

Managerial career
- 2007–: Saint-Étienne (technical coach)
- * Club domestic league appearances and goals

Luc Sonor (born 15 September 1962) is a French former professional footballer who played as a centre-back. His clubs include Sedan, Metz, Monaco and Ayr United.

== Club career ==
Sonor won the Coupe de France twice, once with Monaco and once with Metz. He also won the French Championship with Monaco where he played under Arsène Wenger.

Sonor ended his career with Scottish club side Ayr United.

== International career ==
Sonor collected nine France national team caps including a 2–0 defeat to Scotland at Hampden Park, Glasgow on 8 March 1989. Mo Johnston scored both goals.

== Post-playing career ==
Sonor later worked as technical coach at Saint-Étienne.

== Honours ==
Metz

- Coupe de France: 1984

Monaco

- Ligue 1: 1988
- Coupe de France: 1991
