= 1983–84 Coupe de France =

Tournament details
- Country: France

Final positions
- Champions: Metz (1st title)
- Runners-up: Monaco

The 1983–84 Coupe de France was the 67th Coupe de France, France's annual national football cup competition. It was won by FC Metz, who defeated AS Monaco FC in the final.

== Round of 16 ==
Team 1	Agg.	Team 2	1st leg	2nd leg
RC Lens (D1)	1–0	RC Strasbourg (D1)	1–0	0–0
FC Rouen (D1)	2–4	Stade Lavallois (D1)	1–0	1–3
AS Monaco (D1)	6–1	AS Nancy (D1)	2–0	4–1
Girondins de Bordeaux (D1)	2–3	FC Mulhouse (D2)	0–1	2–2
FC Nantes (D1)	4–4 (a)	Olympique Lyonnais (D2)	0–0	4–4
AS Cannes (D2)	4–1	FC Sochaux-Montbéliard (D1)	3–0	1–1
Sporting Toulon Var (D1)	2–1	En Avant Guingamp (D2)	2–0	0–1
FC Metz (D1)	5–1	Besançon RC (D2)	4–0	1–1

== Quarter-finals ==
Team 1	Agg.	Team 2	1st leg	2nd leg
AS Monaco (D1)	8–4	AS Cannes (D2)	4–2	4–2
FC Nantes (D1)	4–3	FC Mulhouse (D2)	2–0	2–3
RC Lens (D1)	2–3	Sporting Toulon Var (D1)	0–1	2–2
FC Metz (D1)	3–1	Stade Lavallois (D1)	1–0	2–1

== Semi-finals ==
=== First leg ===
25 April 1984

Nantes (1)	2–1	Metz (1)
Halilhodžić 77'; Buscher 89'		Hinschberger 57'

Stade Marcel-Saupin, Nantes
Attendance: 17,000
Referee: Claude Bouillet

25 April 1984

Monaco (1)	4–1	Toulon (1)
Genghini 5'; Krause 32'; Delamontagne 65'; Le Roux 77'		Chaussin 90'

Stade Louis II, Monaco
Attendance: 7,456
Referee: Robert Wurtz

=== Second leg ===
5 May 1984

Metz (1)	1–0	Nantes (1)
Hinschberger 27'

Stade Saint-Symphorien, Metz
Attendance: 22,039
Referee: Joël Quiniou

2–2 on aggregate. Metz won on away goals.

5 May 1984

Toulon (1)	2–1	Monaco (1)
Chaussin 13'; Bénédet 44'		Bravo 74'

Stade de Bon Rencontre, Toulon
Attendance: 17,000
Referee: Georges Konrath

Monaco won 5–3 on aggregate.

== Final ==
11 May 1984

Metz	2–0 (a.e.t.)	Monaco
Hinschberger 102'; Kurbos 108'

Parc des Princes, Paris
Attendance: 45,384
Referee: Michel Vautrot
