= All-time Houston Dynamo roster =

This list comprises all players who have participated in at least one league match for Houston Dynamo since the team's first Major League Soccer season in 2006. Players who were on the roster but never played a first team game are not listed; players who appeared for the team in other competitions (MLS Cup Playoffs, US Open Cup, CONCACAF Champions Cup, North American SuperLiga, Leagues Cup) but never made an MLS regular season appearance are noted at the bottom of the page.

Players in Bold are still on the roster. As of February 2, 2025

Name	Nationality	Position	Years w/ Dynamo	Appearances	Goals	Assists	Refs
Agus	Spain	DF	2016–2017	8	0	0	
Ade Akinbiyi	Nigeria	FW	2009	14	0	0	
Alex	Brazil	MF	2015–2017	77	9	13	
Eric Alexander	United States	MF	2016–2018	43	1	3	
**Ibrahim Aliyu**	Nigeria	FW	2023–	58	9	8	
Arturo Álvarez	El Salvador	MF	2018	18	0	1	
Jalil Anibaba	United States	DF	2016–2017	38	0	1	
Samuel Appiah	Ghana	MF	2010	2	1	0	
Yair Arboleda	Colombia	MF	2016	1	0	0	
Anthony Arena	United States	DF	2013–2014	1	0	0	
**Artur**	Brazil	MF	2023–	68	2	4	
Corey Ashe	United States	DF	2007–2015	211	1	18	
Beto Avila	United States	FW	2022–2023	8	0	0	
Corey Baird	United States	FW	2021–2023	64	10	10	
Mateo Bajamich	Argentina	FW	2020–2021	9	0	1	
Giles Barnes	Jamaica	FW	2012–2016	113	31	14	
Wade Barrett	United States	DF	2006–2009	99	0	5	
**Ethan Bartlow**	United States	DF	2021–	58	0	1	
**Amine Bassi**	Morocco	MF	2023–	59	13	12	
DaMarcus Beasley	United States	DF	2014–2019	124	3	6	
Eric Bird	United States	MF	2017–2019	6	0	0	
José Bizama	Chile	DF	2019–2021	14	0	1	
Latif Blessing	Ghana	MF	2023	27	5	1	
Bobby Bosewll	United States	DF	2008–2013	177	9	5	
Keyner Brown	Costa Rica	DF	2016	4	0	0	
Kyle Brown	United States	FW	2008	4	0	0	
Will Bruin	United States	FW	2011–2016	178	50	20	
Eric Brunner	United States	DF	2013–2014	19	0	0	
Juan David Cabezas	Colombia	MF	2017–2019	48	2	0	
Víctor Cabrera	Argentina	DF	2020–	10	0	0	
Luis Caicedo	Colombia	MF	2023	25	0	0	
Tony Caig	England	GK	2008	7	0	0	
Luiz Camargo	Brazil	MF	2011–2013	40	1	3	
Geoff Cameron	United States	DF/MF	2008–2012	116	11	15	
Franco Caraccio	Argentina	FW	2008	10	2	1	
Calen Carr	United States	FW	2011–2013	35	5	2	
Servando Carrasco	United States	MF	2013–2014	19	0	0	
Adalberto Carrasquilla	Panama	MF	2021–2024	95	9	19	
Tony Cascio	United States	MF	2014	6	0	0	
Juan Castilla	Colombia	MF	2021–2023	2	0	0	
Darwin Cerén	El Salvador	MF	2018–2022	109	3	7	
Ronald Cerritos	El Salvador	FW	2006	15	0	1	
Mike Chabala	United States	DF	2006–2011 2013	51	1	7	
Brian Ching	United States	FW	2006–2013	169	56	22	
Colin Clark	United States	FW	2010–2012	43	5	3	
Ricardo Clark	United States	MF	2006–2009 2012–2017	253	28	23	
Steve Clark	United States	GK	2022–2024	97	0	3	
A.J. Cochran	United States	DF	2014–2015	26	0	0	
Ryan Cochrane	United States	DF	2006–2007 2009–2010	70	2	2	
Joe Corona	United States	MF	2021	30	0	2	
Carlo Costly	Honduras	FW	2011	11	1	1	
Warren Creavalle	Guyana	DF/MF	2012–2014	54	3	2	
Danny Cruz	United States	MF/FW	2009–2011	51	4	5	
Omar Cummings	Jamaica	FW	2013–2014	37	3	3	
Paul Dalglish	Scotland	FW	2006–2007	11	2	1	
Brad Davis	United States	MF	2006–2015	271	41	104	
Dwayne De Rosario	Canada	FW	2006–2008	78	24	11	
A.J. DeLaGarza	Guam	DF	2017–2019	57	0	4	
Tyler Deric	United States	GK	2009–2019	90	0	0	
Alex Dixon	United States	FW	2011–2013	13	1	0	
**Griffin Dorsey**	United States	MF	2021–	98	9	12	
Andrew Driver	England	MF	2013–2014	60	3	2	
Chris Duvall	United States	DF	2019	1	0	0	
Alberth Elis	Honduras	FW	2017–2020	88	34	27	
**Lawrence Ennali**	Germany	FW	2024–	2	1	0	
Jose Escalante	Honduras	MF	2016–2017	6	0	0	
**Franco Escobar**	Argentina	DF	2023–	52	4	3	
Sebastián Ferreira	Paraguay	FW	2022–2024	60	18	6	
Maynor Figueroa	Honduras	DF	2019–2021	58	2	5	
Iván Franco	Paraguay	FW	2023	26	3	3	
Hunter Freeman	United States	DF/MF	2011	23	1	2	
Alejandro Fuenmayor	Venezuela	DF	2018–2022	38	3	2	
McKinze Gaines	United States	FW	2024	11	0	1	
Boniek García	Honduras	MF	2012–2021	235	13	39	
Kevin Garcia	United States	DF	2016–2019	30	1	0	
Jason Garey	United States	FW	2011	10	0	0	
Luis Garrido	Honduras	MF	2014–2015	40	0	0	
Chase Gasper	United States	DF	2023	5	0	0	
Luis Gil	United States	MF	2018	12	0	0	
Kevin Goldthwaite	United States	DF	2006–2007	21	0	1	
Kelly Gray	United States	DF/MF	2006–2007	27	0	1	
Ján Greguš	Slovakia	DF	2024	7	0	0	
Teenage Hadebe	Zimbabwe	DF	2021–2023	51	3	1	
André Hainault	Canada	DF	2009–2012	104	6	6	
Marlon Hairston	United States	MF/DF	2019	12	0	0	
Tally Hall	United States	GK	2009–2014	130	0	0	
Niko Hansen	Denmark	MF/FW	2019–2020	21	2	1	
Héctor Herrera	Mexico	MF	2022–2024	62	5	21	
Chandler Hoffman	United States	FW	2015	5	0	0	
Ian Hoffmann	United States	MF	2021–2022	6	0	0	
Stuart Holden	United States	MF	2006–2009	88	15	13	
Joseph Holland	England	MF	2017	5	0	0	
David Horst	United States	DF	2014–2016	89	4	3	
Taylor Hunter	United States	DF	2015–2018	1	0	0	
Patrick Ianni	United States	DF	2006–2008	35	1	1	
Julius James	Trinidad and Tobago	DF	2009	8	0	0	
Nate Jaqua	United States	FW	2007–2008	29	10	6	
Jason Johnson	Jamaica	FW	2013–2015	21	1	0	
Derrick Jones	United States	MF	2021	20	0	1	
Sam Junqua	United States	DF	2019–2022	46	1	2	
Kei Kamara	Sierra Leone	FW	2008–2009	32	7	3	
Macoumba Kandji	Senegal	FW	2012	29	4	2	
Koke	Spain	FW	2011	7	1	0	
**Sebastian Kowalczyk**	Poland	MF	2023–	41	4	4	
Luis Ángel Landín	Mexico	FW	2009–2010	16	2	3	
Ariel Lassiter	Costa Rica	FW	2020–2021	35	3	1	
Nico Lemoine	United States	FW	2020–2022	12	0	0	
Leonardo	Brazil	DF	2017–2018	54	3	1	
Alexander Lopez	Honduras	MF	2013–2015	28	0	4	
Rob Lovejoy	United States	DF	2015–2016	19	1	1	
Adam Lundqvist	Sweden	DF	2018–2022	121	0	12	
Adolfo Machado	Panama	DF	2017–2018	54	0	2	
Cristian Maidana	Argentina	FW	2016	30	3	4	
Mauro Manotas	Colombia	FW	2015–2020	149	51	17	
Abdoulie Mansally	Gambia	FW	2016	9	0	0	
Marko Marić	Croatia	GK	2020–2021	45	0	0	
Tomás Martínez	Argentina	MF	2017–2020	85	12	16	
Tommy McNamara	United States	MF/FW	2019–2020	37	2	3	
**Micael**	Brazil	DF	2022–	57	1	0	
Leonel Miranda	Argentina	MF	2015-2016	32	3	2	
Adam Moffat	Scotland	MF	2011–2013	62	7	5	
Alejandro Moreno	Venezuela	FW	2006–2007	34	3	6	
Júnior Moreno	Venezuela	MF	2024	2	0	0	
Kyle Morton	United States	GK	2021	1	0	0	
Brian Mullan	United States	MF	2006–2010	136	9	19	
Richard Mulrooney	United States	MF/DF	2007–2010	88	1	13	
Julian Nash	United States	FW	2006–2007	6	0	0	
Francisco Navas	United States	MF	2010–2011	1	0	0	
Michael Nelson	United States	GK	2018–2022	13	0	0	
Joseph Ngwenya	Zimbabwe	FW	2007 2010	37	8	3	
Anthony Obodai	Ghana	MF	2010	4	0	0	
Dominic Odurro	Ghana	FW	2009–2011	44	6	8	
Rasheed Olabiyi	Nigeria	MF	2015	7	0	1	
Pat Onstad	Canada	GK	2006–2010	136	0	0	
Brian Ownby	United States	FW	2012–2014	29	0	2	
Lovel Palmer	Jamaica	DF/MF	2010–2011	45	3	1	
Marcelo Palomino	United States	MF	2020–2022	3	0	0	
Tim Parker	United States	DF	2021–2022	62	0	0	
Tyler Pasher	United States	FW	2021–2022	36	6	4	
Ronaldo Peña	Venezuela	FW	2018–2020	14	1	0	
Fafà Picault	United States	FW	2021–2022	61	18	8	
**Ezequiel Ponce**	Argentina	FW	2024–	10	5	0	
**Nelson Quiñónes**	Colombia	FW	2022–	36	4	2	
Darwin Quintero	Colombia	FW	2020–2022	73	18	17	
Romell Quioto	Honduras	FW	2017–2019	17	15	17	
**Brooklyn Raines**	United States	MF	2022–	23	0	0	
Christian Ramirez	United States	FW	2019–2021	31	8	3	
Dylan Remick	United States	DF	2017–2018	14	1	0	
Eddie Robinson	United States	DF	2006–2011	96	5	7	
David Rocha	Spain	MF	2016	4	0	0	
Memo Rodríguez	United States	MF	2017–2022	136	17	14	
Raul Rodriguez	Spain	DF	2015–2016	52	3	0	
Michael Salazar	Belize	FW	2019–2020	8	0	0	
Vicente Sánchez	Uruguay	FW	2017	21	2	5	
Kofi Sarkodie	United States	DF	2011–2015	98	0	10	
Tate Schmitt	United States	DF	2023–2024	21	1	0	
**Gabriel Segal**	United States	FW	2024–	13	2	0	
Chris Seitz	United States	GK	2018	6	0	0	
Philippe Senderos	Switzerland	DF	2017–2018	10	4	1	
Adrian Serioux	Canada	DF	2006, 2010	33	3	1	
Mark Sherrod	United States	FW	2014	9	2	1	
Brad Smith	Australia	DF	2023–2024	38	3	4	
Mac Steeves	United States	FW	2018	3	0	0	
Zach Steinberger	United States	MF/FW	2015–2016	3	0	0	
**Daniel Steres**	United States	DF	2022–	65	6	7	
Aljaž Struna	Slovenia	DF	2019–2020	46	0	1	
Nathan Sturgis	United States	DF/MF	2012 2015	23	1	2	
**Erik Sviatchenko**	Denmark	DF	2023–	48	1	5	
**Andrew Tarbell**	United States	GK	2023–	5	0	0	
Jermaine Taylor	Jamaica	DF	2011–2015	106	1	4	
Thiago Fernandes	Brazil	FW	2022	3	0	0	
Abe Thompson	United States	FW	2009	1	1	0	
Erick Torres	Mexico	FW	2015–2017	49	14	4	
Thorleifur Úlfarsson	Iceland	FW	2022–2023	49	7	2	
Maximiliano Urruti	Argentina	FW	2021	30	7	4	
Erik Ustruck	Guam	DF/MF	2007–2009	2	0	0	
Zarek Valentin	Puerto Rico	DF	2020–2022	53	0	4	
Jefferson Valverde	Ecuador	MF	2024	1	0	0	
Matías Vera	Argentina	MF	2019–2022	108	3	4	
Craig Waibel	United States	DF	2006–2010	80	6	6	
Charlie Ward	England	MF	2016–2018	1	0	0	
Collen Warner	United States	MF	2016	24	0	1	
Je-Vaughn Watson	Jamaica	MF	2011–2012	41	1	2	
Jared Watts	United States	DF	2018	7	0	1	
Cam Weaver	United States	FW	2009–2013	81	12	3	
Zach Wells	United States	GK	2006–2007	4	0	0	
Andrew Wenger	United States	FW/MF/DF	2016–2018	76	10	6	
Sheanon Williams	United States	DF	2015–2016	36	0	3	
Joe Willis	United States	GK	2015–2019	90	0	1	
Chris Wondolowski	United States	FW	2006–2009	37	4	2	
Wilfried Zahibo	Central African Republic	MF	2020	4	0	0	
Zeca	Brazil	DF	2022	20	0	1	

== Miscellaneous ==
- (United States) Johnny Alcaraz never played in a league match, but came on as an 81st-minute substitute in an Open Cup match.
- (United States) Chris Aloisi never played in a league match, but made two substitute appearances in the Open Cup.
- (Haiti) Charles Auguste never played in a league match, but made a substitute appearance in the Open Cup.
- (United States) T. J. Casner never played in a league match, but came on as a 71st-minute substitute in an Open Cup match.
- (United States) Conor Donovan never played in a league match, but made an appearance in the Open Cup.
- (United States) Jordan Graye never played in a league match, but made an appearance in the Open Cup.
- (United States) Nick Hatzke never played in a league match, but made two starts in the Open Cup.
- (United States) John Michael Hayden never played in a league match, but made five starts in the Open Cup and four in the CONCACAF Champions League.
- (Jamaica) Jorginho James never played in a league match, but made an appearance in the Open Cup.
- (Mexico) Ruben Luna never played in a league match, but made two substitute appearances in the Open cup.
- (United States) Talen Maples never played in a league match, but made two appearances in the Open Cup.
- (South Africa) Mpho Moloi never played in a league match, but made one start in the Open Cup.
- (Colombia) Jhon Montaño never played in a league match, but made one appearance in the Open Cup
- (Nigeria) Mujeeb Murana never played in a league match, but made two appearances in the Open Cup.
- (Senegal) Ousmane Sylla never played in a league match, but made one appearance in the Champions Cup.
- (United States) Manny Padilla never played in a league match, but made one appearance in the Open Cup.
- (Mexico) Aldo Quintanilla never played in a league match, but made one appearance in the Open Cup.
- (Mexico) Óscar Recio never played in a league match, but made one start in the Open Cup.
- (United States) Colin Rolfe never played in a league match, but came on as a 62nd-minute substitute in an Open Cup match.
- (United States) Bryan Salazar never played in a league match, but made one start in the Open Cup.
- (Panama) Carlos Small never played in a league match, but made one appearance in the Open Cup.
- (United States) Josue Soto never played in a league match, but made one substitute appearance in the Open Cup and one in the CONCACAF Champions League.
- (United States) Marcus Storey never played in a league match, but came on as an 81st-minute substitute in an Open Cup match.
- (Suriname) Djevencio van der Kust never played in a league match, but made one appearance in the Open Cup.
- (United States) Todd Wharton never played in a league match, but made an appearance in the Open Cup.
- (United States) Stephen Wondolowski never played in a league match, but made one start in the Open Cup and one in the CONCACAF Champions League.
- (Argentina) Matías Zaldívar never played in a league match, but made one appearance in the Open Cup.

== Sources ==
- "MLS All-Time MLS Player Register". Mlsnet.com. Major League Soccer. Archived from the original on February 14, 2009.
- "MLS Number Assignments Archive".
