= 2024 Houston Dynamo FC season =

Houston Dynamo
2024 season
- Owner: Ted Segal
- General manager: Pat Onstad
- Head coach: Ben Olsen
- Stadium: Shell Energy Stadium
- MLS: Conference: 5th Overall: 8th
- MLS Cup playoffs: Round one
- U.S. Open Cup: Round of 32
- Leagues Cup: Round of 32
- CONCACAF Champions Cup: Round of 16
- Top goalscorer: League: Ibrahim Aliyu (6 goals); All: Ibrahim Aliyu; Ezequiel Ponce; Latif Blessing (6 each)
- Average home league attendance: 17,322
| Home colors | Away colors |

The 2024 Houston Dynamo season was the 19th season of the team's existence since joining Major League Soccer (MLS) prior to the 2006 season.

2024 was the second season under head coach Ben Olsen and the third season under GM Pat Onstad and technical director Asher Mendelsohn. It was the fourth season (third full season) under majority owner Ted Segal. 2024 saw Houston make the playoffs for the second consecutive year after a 5th place finish in the Western Conference. The Dynamo would fall in the first round of the playoffs to the Seattle Sounders 2 games to 0, losing both on penalties. The Dynamo also competed in the 2024 CONCACAF Champions Cup after winning the 2023 U.S. Open Cup.

The 54 points set a Dynamo single season record. On July 16, USMNT legend Tim Howard joined the Dynamo and Dash ownership group. The season was also notable for the signing of striker Ezequiel Ponce for a club record transfer fee from AEK Athens.

== Final roster ==
As of November 4, 2024

Appearances and goals are totals for MLS regular season only.

| No. | Name | Nationality | Position | Date of birth (Age) | Signed from | Signed in | Apps. | Goals |
Goalkeepers
| 12 | Steve Clark | (United States) | GK | April 14, 1986 (age 38) | Portland Timbers | 2022 | 97 | 0 |
| 13 | Andrew Tarbell | (United States) | GK | October 7, 1993 (age 31) | Austin FC | 2023 | 5 | 0 |
| 38 | Xavier Valdez (HGP) | (Dominican Republic) | GK | November 23, 2003 (age 20) | Houston Dynamo Academy | 2022 | 0 | 0 |
Defenders
| 2 | Franco Escobar | (Argentina) | DF | February 21, 1995 (age 29) | Los Angeles FC | 2023 | 52 | 4 |
| 3 | Brad Smith | (Australia) | DF | April 9, 1994 (age 30) | D.C. United | 2023 | 38 | 3 |
| 4 | Ethan Bartlow (GA) | (United States) | DF | February 2, 2000 (age 24) | University of Washington | 2021 | 58 | 0 |
| 5 | Daniel Steres | (United States) | DF | November 11, 1990 (age 33) | LA Galaxy | 2022 | 65 | 6 |
| 22 | Tate Schmitt | (United States) | DF | May 28, 1997 (age 27) | Real Salt Lake | 2023 | 21 | 1 |
| 23 | Kieran Sargeant (HGP) | (United States) | DF | May 13, 2003 (age 21) | Georgetown University | 2024 | 0 | 0 |
| 25 | Griffin Dorsey | (United States) | DF | March 5, 1999 (age 25) | Toronto FC | 2021 | 98 | 9 |
| 28 | Erik Sviatchenko | (Denmark) | DF | October 4, 1991 (age 33) | Midtjylland | 2023 | 48 | 1 |
| 31 | Micael | (Brazil) | DF | August 12, 2000 (age 24) | Atlético Mineiro | 2022 | 57 | 1 |
Midfielders
| 6 | Artur | (Brazil) | MF | March 11, 1996 (age 28) | Columbus Crew | 2023 | 68 | 2 |
| 8 | Amine Bassi | (Morocco) | MF | November 27, 1997 (age 26) | FC Metz | 2023 | 59 | 13 |
| 15 | Latif Blessing | (Ghana) | MF | December 30, 1996 (age 27) | Toronto FC | 2024 | 27 | 5 |
| 16 | Héctor Herrera (DP) | (Mexico) | MF | April 19, 1990 (age 34) | Atlético Madrid | 2022 | 62 | 5 |
| 20 | Adalberto Carrasquilla | (Panama) | MF | November 28, 1998 (age 25) | Cartagena | 2021 | 95 | 9 |
| 21 | Ján Greguš | (Slovakia) | MF | January 29, 1991 (age 33) | Minnesota United | 2024 | 7 | 0 |
| 24 | Júnior Moreno | (Venezuela) | MF | July 20, 1993 (age 31) | Al-Hazem | 2024 | 2 | 0 |
| 26 | Ousmane Sylla | (Senegal) | MF | August 7, 2001 (age 23) | Clemson University | 2024 | 0 | 0 |
| 27 | Sebastian Kowalczyk | (Poland) | MF | August 22, 1998 (age 26) | Pogoń Szczecin | 2023 | 41 | 4 |
| 30 | Jefferson Valverde | (Ecuador) | MF | May 4, 1999 (age 25) | L.D.U. Quito | 2024 | 1 | 0 |
| 35 | Brooklyn Raines (HGP) | (United States) | MF | March 11, 2005 (age 19) | Barça Residency Academy | 2022 | 23 | 0 |
Forwards
| 7 | Nelson Quiñónes (U22) | (Colombia) | FW | August 20, 2002 (age 22) | Once Caldas | 2022 | 36 | 4 |
| 10 | Ezequiel Ponce (DP) | (Argentina) | FW | March 29, 1997 (age 27) | AEK Athens | 2024 | 10 | 5 |
| 11 | Sebastián Ferreira (DP) | (Paraguay) | FW | February 13, 1998 (age 26) | Club Libertad | 2022 | 60 | 18 |
| 14 | McKinze Gaines | (United States) | FW | March 2, 1998 (age 26) | Nashville SC | 2024 | 11 | 0 |
| 17 | Gabriel Segal | (United States) | FW | May 17, 2001 (age 23) | New York City FC | 2024 | 13 | 2 |
| 18 | Ibrahim Aliyu (U22) | (Nigeria) | FW | January 16, 2002 (age 22) | NK Lokomotiva Zagreb | 2023 | 58 | 9 |
| 19 | Stephen Annor Gyamfi (GA) | (Ghana) | FW | May 19, 2003 (age 21) | University of Virginia | 2024 | 0 | 0 |
| 29 | Exon Arzú | (Honduras) | FW | May 19, 2004 (age 20) | Real España | 2024 | 0 | 0 |
| 37 | Lawrence Ennali (U22) | (Germany) | FW | March 7, 2002 (age 22) | Górnik Zabrze | 2024 | 2 | 1 |

== Player movement ==
=== In ===
Per Major League Soccer and club policies terms of the deals do not get disclosed.

| Date | Player | Position | Age | Previous club | Notes | Ref |
|---|---|---|---|---|---|---|
| January 15, 2024 | (United States) Kieran Sargeant | DF | 20 | Georgetown University | Signed as a homegrown player. | |
| February 5, 2024 | (Slovakia) Ján Greguš | MF | 33 | (United States) Minnesota United | Signed on a free transfer. | |
| February 16, 2024 | (United States) Gabriel Segal | FW | 22 | (United States) New York City FC | Acquired in exchange for a 3rd-round pick in the 2025 MLS SuperDraft, with NYCFC maintaining a sell-on percentage. | |
| March 14, 2024 | (Ghana) Latif Blessing | MF | 27 | (Canada) Toronto FC | Acquired in exchange for $75,000 of 2024 GAM, plus a potential $205,000 of 2025 conditional-based GAM. | |
| April 22, 2024 | (United States) McKinze Gaines | FW | 26 | (United States) Nashville SC | Acquired in exchange for $75,000 of 2024 GAM. | |
| April 26, 2024 | (Ecuador) Jefferson Valverde | MF | 24 | (Ecuador) L.D.U. Quito | Signed on a full transfer for an undisclosed fee. | |
| June 17, 2024 | (Argentina) Ezequiel Ponce | FW | 27 | (Greece) AEK Athens | Signed on a full transfer as a Designated Player. Transfer fee undisclosed, but the reported fee is around $8 million. | |
| July 18, 2024 | (Germany) Lawrence Ennali | FW | 22 | (Poland) Górnik Zabrze | Full transfer for an undisclosed fee as a U-22 Initiative player. Fee is reportedly $2,980,000. | |
| August 20, 2024 | (Honduras) Exon Arzú | FW | 20 | (Honduras) Real España | Signed on a full transfer for an undisclosed fee. Was on loan at Dynamo 2. | |
| September 17, 2024 | (Venezuela) Júnior Moreno | MF | 31 | (Saudi Arabia) Al-Hazem | Signed on a free transfer. | |

=== Out ===
| Date | Player | Position | Age | Destination Club | Notes | Ref |
|---|---|---|---|---|---|---|
| December 4, 2023 | (Nigeria) Ifunanyachi Achara | FW | 26 | (United States) Houston Dynamo 2 | Contract option declined, | |
| December 4, 2023 | (Haiti) Charles Auguste | MF | 24 | | Contract option declined, | |
| December 4, 2023 | (United States) Beto Avila | FW | 23 | (United States) Sporting Kansas City II | Contract option declined, | |
| December 4, 2023 | (Zimbabwe) Teenage Hadebe | DF | 28 | (Turkey) Konyaspor | Contract option declined, | |
| December 4, 2023 | (Nigeria) Mujeeb Murana | DF | 23 | (United States) Birmingham Legion FC | Contract option declined, | |
| December 4, 2023 | (El Salvador) Danny Ríos | FW | 20 | (United States) San Antonio FC | Contract option declined, | |
| December 4, 2023 | (Argentina) Matías Vera | MF | 28 | (Paraguay) Olimpia | Contract option declined, | |
| December 4, 2023 | (United States) Corey Baird | FW | 27 | (United States) FC Cincinnati | Contract expired. | |
| January 21, 2024 | (Iceland) Thorleifur Úlfarsson | FW | 23 | (Hungary) Debreceni VSC | Sold for an undisclosed fee. | |
| January 30, 2024 | (United States) Chase Gasper | DF | 28 | (United States) Chicago Fire | Traded for a 3rd round pick in the 2026 MLS SuperDraft. | |
| | (Colombia) Luis Caicedo | MF | 27 | (Colombia) Internacional Palmira | Released by Houston. Date not announced | |

=== MLS SuperDraft ===
| Round | Pick | Player | Position | Age | College | Notes | Ref |
|---|---|---|---|---|---|---|---|
| 1 | 26 | (Ghana) Stephen Annor Gyamfi | FW | 20 | Virginia | Signed to a Generation Adidas contract. | |
| 2 | 55 | (Senegal) Ousmane Sylla | MF | 22 | Clemson | | |

== Staff ==
As of November 4, 2024

Executive
| Majority owner | (United States) Ted Segal |
| Minority owners | (United States) Lyle Ayes (United States) James Harden (United States) Tim Howard |
| General manager/vice president | (Canada) Pat Onstad |
| Technical director | (United States) Asher Mendelsohn |
| Assistant general manager | (United States) Nick Kowba |
| Director of soccer operations | (United States) Francisco Tobar |
Coaching staff
| Head coach | (United States) Ben Olsen |
| Assistant coach | (France) Aurélien Collin |
| Assistant coach | (Venezuela) Juan Guerra |
| Assistant coach | (Germany) Adin Osmanbašić |
| Goalkeeper coach | (United States) Tim Hanley |
| Head of performance | (Republic of Ireland) Paul Caffrey |
| Head video analyst | (United States) Carlon Carpenter |
| Head of sports science | (Australia) Alex Calder |
| Strength & conditioning coach | (United States) Anthony Narcisi |
| Director of sports medicine | (United States) Craig Devine |
| Head athletic trainer | (United States) Matt Murphy |
| Assistant athletic trainer | (United States) Juan Castano |
| Physical therapist | (United States) Micah Kust |
| Massage therapist | (United States) Ivan Diaz |
| Scouting coordinator & analyst | (Uruguay) Sebastian Romero |
| Director of methodology | (England) Ben Bartlett |
| Player care manager | (United States) Martha Carvajal |
| Head equipment manager | (United States) Jaime Gonzalez |

== Competitions ==
=== Major League Soccer ===
==== Standings ====
===== Western Conference =====
| Pos | Team | Pld | W | L | T | GF | GA | GD | Pts | Qualification |
|---|---|---|---|---|---|---|---|---|---|---|
| 3 | Real Salt Lake | 34 | 16 | 7 | 11 | 65 | 48 | +17 | 59 | MLS Cup Round One |
| 4 | Seattle Sounders FC | 34 | 16 | 9 | 9 | 51 | 35 | +16 | 57 | MLS Cup Round One |
| 5 | Houston Dynamo FC | 34 | 15 | 10 | 9 | 47 | 39 | +8 | 54 | MLS Cup Round One |
| 6 | Minnesota United FC | 34 | 15 | 12 | 7 | 58 | 49 | +9 | 52 | MLS Cup Round One |
| 7 | Colorado Rapids | 34 | 15 | 14 | 5 | 61 | 60 | +1 | 50 | MLS Cup Round One |

Source: MLS
Rules for classification: 1) points; 2) total wins; 3) total goal differential; 4) total goals scored; 5) fewer disciplinary points; 6) away goal differential; 7) away goals scored; 8) home goals differential; 9) home goals scored; 10) coin toss (2 clubs tied) or drawing of lots (≥3 clubs tied)

===== Overall =====
| Pos | Team | Pld | W | L | T | GF | GA | GD | Pts | Qualification |
|---|---|---|---|---|---|---|---|---|---|---|
| 6 | Real Salt Lake | 34 | 16 | 7 | 11 | 65 | 48 | +17 | 59 | CONCACAF Champions Cup |
| 7 | Seattle Sounders FC | 34 | 16 | 9 | 9 | 51 | 35 | +16 | 57 | CONCACAF Champions Cup |
| 8 | Houston Dynamo FC | 34 | 15 | 10 | 9 | 47 | 39 | +8 | 54 | |
| 9 | Orlando City SC | 34 | 15 | 12 | 7 | 59 | 50 | +9 | 52 | |
| 10 | Minnesota United FC | 34 | 15 | 12 | 7 | 58 | 49 | +9 | 52 | |

Source: MLS
Rules for classification: 1) points; 2) total wins; 3) total goal differential; 4) total goals scored; 5) fewer disciplinary points; 6) away goal differential; 7) away goals scored; 8) home goals differential; 9) home goals scored; 10) coin toss (2 clubs tied) or drawing of lots (≥3 clubs tied)

==== Results summary ====
| Overall | | | | | | | | Home | | | | | | Away | | | | | |
| Pld | W | D | L | GF | GA | GD | Pts | W | D | L | GF | GA | GD | W | D | L | GF | GA | GD |
|---|---|---|---|---|---|---|---|---|---|---|---|---|---|---|---|---|---|---|---|
| 34 | 15 | 9 | 10 | 47 | 39 | +8 | 54 | 7 | 7 | 3 | 22 | 15 | +7 | 8 | 2 | 7 | 25 | 24 | +1 |

==== Results by round ====
| Round | 1 | 2 | 3 | 4 | 5 | 6 | 7 | 8 | 9 | 10 | 11 | 12 | 13 | 14 | 15 | 16 | 17 | 18 | 19 | 20 | 21 | 22 | 23 | 24 | 25 | 26 | 27 | 28 | 29 | 30 | 31 | 32 | 33 | 34 |
|---|---|---|---|---|---|---|---|---|---|---|---|---|---|---|---|---|---|---|---|---|---|---|---|---|---|---|---|---|---|---|---|---|---|---|
| Stadium | H | H | H | A | H | A | A | H | A | H | A | A | H | A | H | A | A | H | A | H | A | H | H | A | A | H | A | H | H | A | A | H | A | H |
| Result | D | L | W | W | W | L | W | L | L | D | W | L | D | L | W | D | D | D | W | W | L | D | W | W | L | W | D | W | D | W | L | W | L | W |
| Position (conf.) | 5 | 10 | 9 | 7 | 5 | 6 | 3 | 6 | 8 | 8 | 7 | 8 | 8 | 8 | 8 | 7 | 7 | 8 | 7 | 6 | 7 | 8 | 8 | 6 | 8 | 7 | 7 | 6 | 7 | 5 | 6 | 5 | 5 | 5 |
| Position (league) | 11 | 21 | 18 | 14 | 9 | 12 | 5 | 10 | 14 | 15 | 13 | 15 | 15 | 15 | 15 | 13 | 14 | 15 | 13 | 12 | 13 | 14 | 14 | 11 | 13 | 11 | 11 | 9 | 10 | 8 | 9 | 8 | 9 | 8 |

Updated to match(es) played on October 19, 2024. Source: Match results
A = Away; H = Home; W = Win; D = Draw; L = Loss; P = Postponed

==== Match results ====
| February 24 1 | Houston Dynamo | 1–1 | Sporting Kansas City | Houston, Texas |
| 7:30 PM CST | Segal 69' | Report | Russell (yellow card) 57'; Thommy 61', (yellow card) 67' | Stadium: Shell Energy Stadium; Attendance: 18,818; Referee: Jaime Herrera |

| March 2 2 | Houston Dynamo | 1–2 | New York Red Bulls | Houston, Texas |
| 7:30 PM CST | Aliyu 7', (yellow card) 74'; Clark (yellow card) 36'; Dorsey (yellow card) 65'; Escobar (yellow card) 90+5' | Report | Manoel 43'; Morgan 59'; Amaya (yellow card) 64'; Harper (yellow card) 90+5' | Stadium: Shell Energy Stadium; Attendance: 16,516; Referee: Lorenzo Hernandez |

| March 16 3 | Houston Dynamo | 1–0 | Portland Timbers | Houston, Texas |
| 7:30 PM CDT | Aliyu 43'; Dorsey (yellow card) 52'; Kowalczyk (yellow card) 70'; Artur (yellow card) 80' | Report | Župarić (yellow card) 57'; Miller (yellow card) 64' | Stadium: Shell Energy Stadium; Attendance: 16,003; Referee: Erick Lezama Pavon |

| March 23 4 | Colorado Rapids | 0–1 | Houston Dynamo | Commerce City, Colorado |
| 8:30 PM CDT | Abubakar (yellow card) 65' | Report | Escobar (yellow card) 64'; Smith 90+6' | Stadium: Dick's Sporting Goods Park; Attendance: 13,432; Referee: Mario Maric |

| March 30 5 | Houston Dynamo | 2–1 | San Jose Earthquakes | Houston, Texas |
| 7:30 PM CDT | Carrasquilla (yellow card) 45+2'; Ferreira 81', (yellow card) 88'; Escobar 85' | Report | Wilson 1'; Marie (yellow card) 9'; Judd (red card) 34'; Akapo (yellow card) 76'; Yueill (yellow card) 87' (yellow-red card) 90+5'; Gruezo (yellow card) 90+5' | Stadium: Shell Energy Stadium; Attendance: 16,184; Referee: Ismir Pekmic |

| April 6 6 | Chicago Fire | 2–1 | Houston Dynamo | Chicago, Illinois |
| 7:30 PM CDT | Shaqiri 10' (pen.); Czichos (yellow card) 68'; Gutiérrez 78' | Report | Sviatchenko (yellow card) 44'; Aliyu 65' | Stadium: Soldier Field; Attendance: 18,844; Referee: Malik Badawi |

| April 13 7 | Minnesota United | 1–2 | Houston Dynamo | Saint Paul, Minnesota |
| 7:30 PM CDT | Boxall (yellow card) 56'; Fragapane 70' | Report | Carrasquilla (yellow card) 23'; Bran 38' (o.g.); Micael (yellow card) 40'; Kowalczyk (yellow card) 74' (goal) 77'; Steres (yellow card) 88' | Stadium: Allianz Field; Attendance: 19,658; Referee: Filip Dujic |

| April 20 8 Copa Tejas | Houston Dynamo | 0–1 | Austin FC | Houston, Texas |
| 7:30 PM CDT | Kowalczyk (yellow card) 28'; Carrasquilla (yellow card) 37'; Artur (yellow card) 45+3'; Ferreira (yellow card) 77' | Report | Rigoni 86'; Driussi (yellow card) 88'; Zardes (yellow card) 90+3' | Stadium: Shell Energy Stadium; Attendance: 20,115; Referee: Rubiel Vazquez |

| April 27 9 Texas Derby | FC Dallas | 2–0 | Houston Dynamo | Frisco, Texas |
| 7:30 PM CDT | Musa (yellow card) 17', (goal) 55'; Illarramendi (yellow card) 42'; Kamungo (yellow card) 73'; Ibeagha 80' | Report | Dorsey (red card) 5'; Micael (yellow card) 62'; Gaines (yellow card) 87' | Stadium: Toyota Stadium; Attendance: 19,096; Referee: Lukasz Szpala |

| May 4 10 | Houston Dynamo | 0–0 | St. Louis City SC | Houston, Texas |
| 7:30 PM CDT | Schmitt (yellow card) 85' | Report | Ostrák (yellow card) 74'; Jackson (yellow card) 87' | Stadium: Shell Energy Stadium; Attendance: 22,039; Referee: Sergii Boiko |

| May 11 11 | Sporting Kansas City | 1–2 | Houston Dynamo | Kansas City, Kansas |
| 7:30 PM CDT | Rodríguez (yellow card) 45'; Sallói 61'; Fontàs (yellow card) 85' | Report | Herrera 31'; Aliyu 78'; Kowalczyk (yellow card) 90+4' | Stadium: Children's Mercy Park; Attendance: 18,562; Referee: Alexis Da Silva |

| May 15 12 Copa Tejas | Austin FC | 1–0 | Houston Dynamo | Austin, Texas |
| 7:30 PM CDT | Cascante (yellow card) 31'; Driussi 87'; Gallagher (yellow card) 90'; Fodrey (yellow card) 90+5' | Report | Dorsey (yellow card) 60' | Stadium: Q2 Stadium; Attendance: 20,738; Referee: Filip Dujic |

| May 18 13 Texas Derby | Houston Dynamo | 1–1 | FC Dallas | Houston, Texas |
| 7:30 PM CDT | Bassi 45+6'; Kowalczyk (yellow card) 54'; Segal (yellow card) 90+3' | Report | Norris (yellow card) 57'; Musa 69' | Stadium: Shell Energy Stadium; Attendance: 19,284; Referee: Tori Penso |

| May 25 14 | LA Galaxy | 2–1 | Houston Dynamo | Carson, California |
| 9:30 PM CDT | Pec 44'; Puig 59'; Brugman (yellow card) 90+4' | Report | Blessing 18' | Stadium: Dignity Health Sports Park; Attendance: 21,707; Referee: Allen Chapman |

| May 29 15 | Houston Dynamo | 3–1 | Colorado Rapids | Houston, Texas |
| 7:30 PM CDT | Bassi 40'; Blessing 70'; Aliyu (yellow card) 77'; Kowalczyk 80' | Report | Anderson (yellow card) 42'; Mihailović 49' | Stadium: Shell Energy Stadium; Attendance: 15,237; Referee: Marcos DeOliveira II |

| June 1 16 | Portland Timbers | 2–2 | Houston Dynamo | Portland, Oregon |
| 9:30 PM CDT | Mora 37'; Župarić (yellow card) 67'; Evander (yellow card) 71'; Chará (yellow card) 73'; Fogaça 76'; Williamson (yellow card) 82' | Report | Kowalczyk 9'; Escobar (yellow card) 27'; Carrasquilla 50'; Bassi (yellow card) 52'; Herrera (yellow card) 53'; Micael (yellow card) 76'; Dorsey (yellow card) 90+5'; Raines (yellow card) 90+7' | Stadium: Providence Park; Attendance: 21,214; Referee: Guido Gonzales, Jr. |

| June 15 17 | Atlanta United | 2–2 | Houston Dynamo | Atlanta, Georgia |
| 6:30 PM CDT | Silva (yellow card) 8', (goal) 55'; Ríos 25' | Report | Escobar 5', (yellow card) 42'; Carrasquilla (yellow card) 44'; Aliyu (yellow card) 53'; Micael (yellow card) 58'; Blessing 89' | Stadium: Mercedes-Benz Stadium; Attendance: 42,630; Referee: Victor Rivas |

| June 19 18 | Houston Dynamo | 2–2 | Seattle Sounders | Houston, Texas |
| 7:30 PM CDT | Aliyu (yellow card) 6'; Blessing 30', 40'; Raines (yellow card) 89'; Steres (yellow card) 90+3' | Report | Rothrock 57'; Ragen 63'; Ruidíaz (yellow card) 90+4' | Stadium: Shell Energy Stadium; Attendance: 15,096; Referee: Drew Fischer |

| June 22 19 | D.C. United | 1–4 | Houston Dynamo | Washington, D.C. |
| 6:30 PM CDT | Murrell (yellow card) 25'; Benteke 38', (yellow card) 66' (red card) 66'; Akinmboni (yellow card) 50' (yellow-red card) 90+4'; Dájome (yellow card) 73'; Bartlett (yellow card) 79' | Report | Ferreira 51', 54', 86'; Segal 90+5'; Steres (yellow card) 90+9' | Stadium: Audi Field; Attendance: 17,993; Referee: Timothy Ford |

| June 29 20 | Houston Dynamo | 1–0 | Charlotte FC | Houston, Texas |
| 7:30 PM CDT | Aliyu 5'; Escobar (yellow card) 69' | Report | Diani (yellow card) 27' | Stadium: Shell Energy Stadium; Attendance: 15,321; Referee: Pierre-Luc Lauziere |

| July 3 21 | Real Salt Lake | 3–2 | Houston Dynamo | Sandy, Utah |
| 8:30 PM CDT | Gómez 22'; Luna 42'; Ojeda 67', (yellow card) 77'; Eneli (yellow card) 90+2' | Report | Blessing (yellow card) 5'; Aliyu 8'; Brody 55' (o.g.) | Stadium: America First Field; Attendance: 21,522; Referee: Allen Chapman |

| July 13 22 | Houston Dynamo | 1–1 | Minnesota United | Houston, Texas |
| 7:30 PM CDT | Dorsey (yellow card) 36'; Ferreira 82'; Bassi (yellow card) 87' | Report | Lod 70'; Padelford (yellow card) 90+4' | Stadium: Shell Energy Stadium; Attendance: 17,142; Referee: Jon Freemon |

| July 17 23 | San Jose Earthquakes | 0–1 | Houston Dynamo | San Jose, California |
| 9:30 PM CDT | | Report | Bassi (yellow card) 15'; Steres 86' | Stadium: PayPal Park; Attendance: 12,177; Referee: Natalie Simon |

| July 20 24 | Vancouver Whitecaps | 3–4 | Houston Dynamo | Vancouver, British Columbia |
| 9:30 PM CDT | Cubas (yellow card) 45+3'; Picault 48', 66'; Veselinović 54' (yellow card) 79' | Report | Artur (yellow card) 20'; Carrasquilla 29'; Dorsey 36', 87'; Escobar (yellow card) 76'; Smith 78' (yellow card) 90+3' | Stadium: BC Place; Attendance: 24,114; Referee: Fotis Bazakos |

| August 24 25 | Houston Dynamo | 0–1 | Toronto FC | Houston, Texas |
| 7:30 PM CDT | Kowalczyk (yellow card) 78' | Report | Osorio (yellow card) 5'; Flores (yellow card) 45'; Owusu 54'; Bernardeschi (yellow card) 60' | Stadium: Shell Energy Stadium; Attendance: 16,640; Referee: Ted Unkel |

| August 31 26 | Los Angeles FC | 0–2 | Houston Dynamo | Los Angeles, California |
| 9:30 PM CDT | Bouanga (yellow card) 36'; Palencia (yellow card) 55' | Report | Ponce 28' (yellow card) 53'; Escobar (yellow card) 33'; Dorsey (yellow card) 34'; Herrera (yellow card) 49'; Ennali 72' | Stadium: BMO Stadium; Attendance: 22,176; Referee: Armando Villarreal |

| September 7 27 | Houston Dynamo | 0–0 | Los Angeles FC | Houston, Texas |
| 7:30 PM CDT | Herrera (yellow card) 45+5'; Artur (yellow card) 55'; Micael (yellow card) 78'; Escobar (yellow card) 85' | Report | Sánchez (yellow card) 25'; Atuesta (yellow card) 52'; O'Brien (yellow card) 56' | Stadium: Shell Energy Stadium; Referee: Guido Gonzales Jr. |
Note: Game postponed from July 7 due to inclement weather.

| September 14 28 | Houston Dynamo | 4–1 | Real Salt Lake | Houston, Texas |
| 7:30 PM CDT | Steres (yellow card) 24'; Bassi 27'; Ponce (yellow card) 39', (goal) 81'; Dorsey 45+3'; Kowalczyk 75' | Report | Arango (yellow card) 32'; Sviatchenko 49' (o.g.); Katranis (yellow card) 63'; Glad (yellow card) 90+4' | Stadium: Shell Energy Stadium; Attendance: 15,862; Referee: Jon Freemon |

| September 18 29 | Houston Dynamo | 1–1 | Vancouver Whitecaps | Houston, Texas |
| 7:30 PM CDT | Sviatchenko (yellow card) 38'; Ponce 45+7' (pen.); Micael (yellow card) 57'; Bassi (yellow card) 90+4' | Report | Vite (yellow card) 26'; Takaoka (yellow card) 37'; White 73' | Stadium: Shell Energy Stadium; Attendance: 14,282; Referee: Alexis Da Silva |

| September 21 30 Copa Tejas | Austin FC | 0–1 | Houston Dynamo | Austin, Texas |
| 7:30 PM CDT | Driussi (yellow card) 33'; Cascante (yellow card) 38'; Biro (yellow card) 57' | Report | Carrasquilla (yellow card) 42', (goal) 83'; Kowalczyk (yellow card) 90' | Stadium: Q2 Stadium; Attendance: 20,738; Referee: Victor Rivas |

| September 28 31 | Seattle Sounders | 1–0 | Houston Dynamo | Seattle, Washington |
| 9:30 PM CDT | Rothrock 22'; Yeimar (yellow card) 63' | Report | Dorsey (yellow card) 28'; Escobar (yellow card) 50'; Carrasquilla (yellow card) 78' | Stadium: Lumen Field; Attendance: 30,015; Referee: Allen Chapman |

| October 2 32 | Houston Dynamo | 2–1 | New England Revolution | Houston, Texas |
| 7:30 PM CDT | Steres (yellow card) 8'; Ponce 50', (yellow card) 90+6'; Sviatchenko 68' | Report | C. Gil 54' (pen.); Miller (yellow card) 68' | Stadium: Shell Energy Stadium; Attendance: 15,356; Referee: Fotis Bazakos |

| October 5 33 | St. Louis City SC | 3–0 | Houston Dynamo | St. Louis, Missouri |
| 7:30 PM CDT | Becher 14', 47'; Totland (yellow card) 39'Nilsson (yellow card) 85'; Nerwinski 90+2' | Report | Escobar (yellow card) 19' (yellow-red card) 79' | Stadium: Citypark; Attendance: 22,423; Referee: Tori Penso |

| October 19 34 | Houston Dynamo | 2–1 | LA Galaxy | Houston, Texas |
| 8:00 PM CDT | Bassi (yellow card) 10'; Ponce 44'; Raines (yellow card) 90+6'; Steres 90+11' | Report | Paintsil (yellow card) 55'; Pec 90+6' (pen.) | Stadium: Shell Energy Stadium; Attendance: 20,800; Referee: Rosendo Mendoza |

=== MLS Cup playoffs ===
==== Round One ====
| October 28 Game 1 | Seattle Sounders | 0–0 (5–4 p) | Houston Dynamo | Seattle, Washington |
| 8:00 PM CDT | Paulo (yellow card) 61'; Ragen (yellow card) 62'; Leyva (yellow card) 72'; Rothrock (yellow card) 83' | Report | Herrera (yellow card) 55'; Carrasquilla (red card) 66' | Stadium: Lumen Field; Attendance: 30,026; Referee: Ted Unkel |
| | Penalties |
| | Ruidíaz (penalty scored); Rusnák (penalty scored); Ragen (penalty scored); C. Roldan (penalty scored); A. Roldán (penalty scored) | | (penalty scored) Ponce; (penalty scored) Dorsey; (penalty scored) Kowalczyk; (penalty missed) Sviatchenko; (penalty scored) Steres |

| November 3 Game 2 | Houston Dynamo | 1-1 (6–7 p) | Seattle Sounders | Houston, Texas |
| 5:30 pm CST | Escobar (yellow card) 63'; Herrera (yellow card) 65' (red card) 66'; Artur (yellow card) 79'; Dorsey (yellow card) 85'; C. Roldan 90+3' (o.g.) | Report | Nouhou (yellow card) 85'; C. Roldan 87' | Stadium: Shell Energy Stadium; Attendance: 18,859; Referee: Armando Villarreal |
| | Penalties |
| | Ponce (penalty scored); Dorsey (penalty scored); Kowalczyk (penalty scored); Ferreira (penalty scored); Steres (penalty scored); Raines (penalty scored); Schmitt (penalty missed) | | (penalty scored) C. Roldan; (penalty scored) Ragen; (penalty scored) A. Roldán; (penalty scored) Leyva; (penalty scored) Ruidíaz; (penalty scored) Minoungou; (penalty scored) Vargas |
Note: Seattle won the series 2–0.

=== U.S. Open Cup ===
| May 7 Round of 32 | Houston Dynamo (Texas) | 3–3 (9–10 p) | (Michigan) Detroit City FC | Houston, Texas |
| 7:00 PM CDT | Dorsey 6'; Blessing 31'; Carrasquilla 77' | Report | Amoo-Mensah (yellow card) 19'; Williams 41'; Matthews 75'; Carroll (yellow card) 80'; Rodriguez 83'; Murphy (yellow card) 90+4'; Gasso (yellow card) 120' | Stadium: Shell Energy Stadium; Attendance: 7,540; Referee: Claudiu Badea |
| | Penalties |
| | Bassi (penalty scored); Kowalczyk (penalty scored); Carrasquilla (penalty scored); Greguš (penalty scored); Ibrahim (penalty missed); Sviatchenko (penalty scored); Bartlow (penalty scored); Dorsey (penalty scored); Schmitt (penalty scored); Artur (penalty scored); Tarbell (penalty missed) | | (penalty scored) Matthews; (penalty scored) Villanueva; (penalty missed) Morris; (penalty scored) Murphy; (penalty scored) Michael Bryant; (penalty scored) Gasso; (penalty scored) Espeleta; (penalty scored) Amoo-Mensah; (penalty scored) Rutz; (penalty scored) Carroll; (penalty scored) Saldaña |

=== CONCACAF Champions Cup ===
==== Round One ====
| February 20 Round One 1st Leg | St. Louis City SC (United States) | 2–1 | (United States) Houston Dynamo | St. Louis, Missouri |
| 7:00 PM CST | Parker 61'; Kijima 90+1' | Report | Clark (yellow card) 21'; Kowalczyk 72'; Dorsey (yellow card) 89'; Segal (yellow card) 90' | Stadium: CityPark; Attendance: 20,900; Referee: Adonai Escobedo (Mexico) |

| February 27 Round One 2nd Leg | Houston Dynamo (United States) | 1–0 (2–2 agg.) | (United States) St. Louis City SC | Houston, Texas |
| 9:30 PM CST | Sviatchenko 60'; Escobar (yellow card) 90+3' | Report | Nerwinski (yellow card) 42'; Wentzel (yellow card) 90' | Stadium: Shell Energy Stadium; Attendance: 5,007; Referee: Marco Ortíz (Mexico) |
Note: 2–2 on aggregate. Houston advance on away goals.

==== Round of 16 ====
| March 6 Round of 16 1st Leg | Houston Dynamo (United States) | 0–1 | (United States) Columbus Crew | Houston, Texas |
| 7:00 PM CST | Bartlow (yellow card) 64' | Report | Mățan 90+6' | Stadium: Shell Energy Stadium; Attendance: 4,379; Referee: Armando Villarreal (United States) |

| March 12 Round of 16 2nd Leg | Columbus Crew (United States) | 1–1 (2–1 agg.) | (United States) Houston Dynamo | Columbus, Ohio |
| 5:00 PM CDT | Yeboah (yellow card) 29'; Hernández 40' | Report | Dorsey 90' (pen.); Micael (yellow card) 90+2'; Schmitt (yellow card) 90+4' | Stadium: Lower.com Field; Attendance: 12,420; Referee: Oshane Nation (Jamaica) |
Note: Columbus won the series 2–1.

=== Leagues Cup ===
==== West 8 ====
| Pos | Team | Pld | W | PW | PL | L | GF | GA | GD | Pts | Qualification | HOU | ATL | RSL |
|---|---|---|---|---|---|---|---|---|---|---|---|---|---|---|
| 1 | (United States Soccer Federation) Houston Dynamo FC | 2 | 1 | 0 | 0 | 1 | 3 | 1 | +2 | 3 | Advance to knockout stage | — | 0–1 | 3–0 |
| 2 | (Mexican Football Federation) Atlas | 2 | 1 | 0 | 0 | 1 | 2 | 2 | 0 | 3 | Advance to knockout stage | — | — | — |
| 3 | (United States Soccer Federation) Real Salt Lake | 2 | 1 | 0 | 0 | 1 | 2 | 4 | −2 | 3 | | — | 2–1 | — |

Source: Leagues Cup
Rules for classification: Tiebreakers

| July 27 Group stage | Houston Dynamo (United States) | 0–1 | (Mexico) Atlas | Houston, Texas |
| 7:00 PM CDT | Escobar (yellow card) 41' | Report | Mora (yellow card) 29'; Lozano 83' | Stadium: Shell Energy Stadium; Attendance: 15,398; Referee: Ismael Cornejo |

| August 5 Group stage | Houston Dynamo (United States) | 3–0 | (United States) Real Salt Lake | Houston, Texas |
| 8:00 PM CDT | Herrera 7'; Micael 24'; Glad 42' (o.g.); Ponce (yellow card) 62' | Report | | Stadium: Shell Energy Stadium; Attendance: 11,062; Referee: Keylor Herrera |

==== Knockout stage ====
| August 9 Round of 32 | Toluca (Mexico) | 2–2 (5–4 p) | (United States) Houston Dynamo FC | Houston, Texas |
| 20:30 (19:30 UTC−5) | Angulo 39'; Gallardo (yellow card) 45+3'; López 90+6' | Report | Ponce 41'; Micael 62'; Artur (yellow card) 87' | Stadium: Shell Energy Stadium; Referee: Rubiel Vazquez (United States) |
| | Penalties |
| | Volpi (penalty scored); Morales (penalty scored); Paulinho (penalty scored); Gallardo (penalty scored); López (penalty scored) | | (penalty scored) Dorsey; (penalty scored) Kowalczyk; (penalty scored) Ferreira; (penalty missed) Ennali; (penalty scored) Sviatchenko |

== Player statistics ==
=== Appearances, goals, and assists ===
| No. | Pos. | Nat. | Player | Total | | | MLS | | | Playoffs | | | U.S. Open Cup | | | Champions Cup | | | Leagues Cup | | |
| No. | Pos. | Nat. | Player | Apps | G | A | Apps | G | A | Apps | G | A | Apps | G | A | Apps | G | A | Apps | G | A |
|---|---|---|---|---|---|---|---|---|---|---|---|---|---|---|---|---|---|---|---|---|---|
| 2 | DF | (Argentina) | Franco Escobar | 32 | 2 | 3 | 24 | 2 | 2 | 2 | 0 | 0 | 0 | 0 | 0 | 3 | 0 | 0 | 3 | 0 | 1 |
| 3 | DF | (Australia) | Brad Smith | 25 | 2 | 2 | 20 | 2 | 2 | 0 | 0 | 0 | 1 | 0 | 0 | 4 | 0 | 0 | 0 | 0 | 0 |
| 4 | DF | (United States) | Ethan Bartlow | 21 | 0 | 0 | 16 | 0 | 0 | 0 | 0 | 0 | 1 | 0 | 0 | 3 | 0 | 0 | 1 | 0 | 0 |
| 5 | DF | (United States) | Daniel Steres | 29 | 2 | 5 | 22 | 2 | 4 | 2 | 0 | 0 | 1 | 0 | 0 | 2 | 0 | 1 | 2 | 0 | 0 |
| 6 | MF | (Brazil) | Artur | 44 | 0 | 4 | 34 | 0 | 4 | 2 | 0 | 0 | 1 | 0 | 0 | 4 | 0 | 0 | 3 | 0 | 0 |
| 7 | FW | (Colombia) | Nelson Quiñónes | 0 | 0 | 0 | 0 | 0 | 0 | 0 | 0 | 0 | 0 | 0 | 0 | 0 | 0 | 0 | 0 | 0 | 0 |
| 8 | MF | (Morocco) | Amine Bassi | 40 | 3 | 10 | 31 | 3 | 8 | 2 | 0 | 0 | 1 | 0 | 1 | 3 | 0 | 0 | 3 | 0 | 1 |
| 10 | FW | (Argentina) | Ezequiel Ponce | 15 | 6 | 0 | 10 | 5 | 0 | 2 | 0 | 0 | 0 | 0 | 0 | 0 | 0 | 0 | 3 | 1 | 0 |
| 11 | FW | (Paraguay) | Sebastián Ferreira | 22 | 5 | 3 | 18 | 5 | 3 | 1 | 0 | 0 | 0 | 0 | 0 | 1 | 0 | 0 | 2 | 0 | 0 |
| 12 | GK | (United States) | Steve Clark | 39 | 0 | 1 | 31 | 0 | 1 | 2 | 0 | 0 | 0 | 0 | 0 | 4 | 0 | 0 | 2 | 0 | 0 |
| 13 | GK | (United States) | Andrew Tarbell | 6 | 0 | 0 | 4 | 0 | 0 | 0 | 0 | 0 | 1 | 0 | 0 | 0 | 0 | 0 | 1 | 0 | 0 |
| 14 | FW | (United States) | McKinze Gaines | 11 | 0 | 1 | 11 | 0 | 1 | 0 | 0 | 0 | 0 | 0 | 0 | 0 | 0 | 0 | 0 | 0 | 0 |
| 15 | DF | (Ghana) | Latif Blessing | 32 | 6 | 1 | 27 | 5 | 1 | 1 | 0 | 0 | 1 | 1 | 0 | 0 | 0 | 0 | 3 | 0 | 0 |
| 16 | MF | (Mexico) | Héctor Herrera | 28 | 2 | 5 | 22 | 1 | 3 | 2 | 0 | 0 | 1 | 0 | 1 | 0 | 0 | 0 | 3 | 1 | 1 |
| 17 | FW | (United States) | Gabriel Segal | 19 | 2 | 1 | 13 | 2 | 0 | 0 | 0 | 0 | 1 | 0 | 1 | 4 | 0 | 0 | 1 | 0 | 0 |
| 18 | FW | (Nigeria) | Ibrahim Aliyu | 43 | 6 | 6 | 34 | 6 | 5 | 2 | 0 | 0 | 1 | 0 | 0 | 3 | 0 | 1 | 3 | 0 | 0 |
| 19 | MF | (Ghana) | Stephen Annor Gyamfi | 0 | 0 | 0 | 0 | 0 | 0 | 0 | 0 | 0 | 0 | 0 | 0 | 0 | 0 | 0 | 0 | 0 | 0 |
| 20 | MF | (Panama) | Adalberto Carrasquilla | 35 | 4 | 7 | 28 | 3 | 7 | 1 | 0 | 0 | 1 | 1 | 0 | 4 | 0 | 0 | 1 | 0 | 0 |
| 21 | FW | (Slovakia) | Ján Greguš | 12 | 0 | 0 | 7 | 0 | 0 | 0 | 0 | 0 | 1 | 0 | 0 | 4 | 0 | 0 | 0 | 0 | 0 |
| 22 | DF | (United States) | Tate Schmitt | 20 | 0 | 0 | 16 | 0 | 0 | 1 | 0 | 0 | 0 | 0 | 0 | 3 | 0 | 0 | 0 | 0 | 0 |
| 23 | FW | (United States) | Kieran Sargeant | 0 | 0 | 0 | 0 | 0 | 0 | 0 | 0 | 0 | 0 | 0 | 0 | 0 | 0 | 0 | 0 | 0 | 0 |
| 24 | DF | (Venezuela) | Júnior Moreno | 2 | 0 | 0 | 2 | 0 | 0 | 0 | 0 | 0 | 0 | 0 | 0 | 0 | 0 | 0 | 0 | 0 | 0 |
| 25 | DF | (United States) | Griffin Dorsey | 42 | 5 | 4 | 32 | 3 | 4 | 2 | 0 | 0 | 1 | 1 | 0 | 4 | 1 | 0 | 3 | 0 | 0 |
| 26 | MF | (Senegal) | Ousmane Sylla | 1 | 0 | 0 | 0 | 0 | 0 | 0 | 0 | 0 | 0 | 0 | 0 | 1 | 0 | 0 | 0 | 0 | 0 |
| 27 | MF | (Poland) | Sebastian Kowalczyk | 43 | 5 | 4 | 33 | 4 | 3 | 2 | 0 | 0 | 1 | 0 | 0 | 4 | 1 | 0 | 3 | 0 | 0 |
| 28 | DF | (Denmark) | Erik Sviatchenko | 40 | 2 | 4 | 31 | 1 | 4 | 2 | 0 | 0 | 1 | 0 | 0 | 3 | 1 | 0 | 3 | 0 | 0 |
| 29 | FW | (Honduras) | Exon Arzú | 0 | 0 | 0 | 0 | 0 | 0 | 0 | 0 | 0 | 0 | 0 | 0 | 0 | 0 | 0 | 0 | 0 | 0 |
| 30 | MF | (Ecuador) | Jefferson Valverde | 1 | 0 | 0 | 1 | 0 | 0 | 0 | 0 | 0 | 0 | 0 | 0 | 0 | 0 | 0 | 0 | 0 | 0 |
| 31 | DF | (Brazil) | Micael | 42 | 2 | 0 | 32 | 0 | 0 | 2 | 0 | 0 | 1 | 0 | 0 | 4 | 0 | 0 | 3 | 2 | 0 |
| 35 | MF | (United States) | Brooklyn Raines | 20 | 0 | 0 | 15 | 0 | 0 | 2 | 0 | 0 | 0 | 0 | 0 | 2 | 0 | 0 | 1 | 0 | 0 |
| 37 | FW | (Germany) | Lawrence Ennali | 5 | 1 | 0 | 2 | 1 | 0 | 0 | 0 | 0 | 0 | 0 | 0 | 0 | 0 | 0 | 3 | 0 | 0 |
| 38 | GK | (Dominican Republic) | Xavier Valdez | 0 | 0 | 0 | 0 | 0 | 0 | 0 | 0 | 0 | 0 | 0 | 0 | 0 | 0 | 0 | 0 | 0 | 0 |

Source: Season statistics and match reports in Competitions

=== Disciplinary record ===
| No. | Pos. | Nat. | Player | Total | | MLS | | Playoffs | | U.S. Open Cup | | Champions Cup | | Leagues Cup | |
| No. | Pos. | Nat. | Player | Booked | Sent off (straight red) | Booked | Sent off (straight red) | Booked | Sent off (straight red) | Booked | Sent off (straight red) | Booked | Sent off (straight red) | Booked | Sent off (straight red) |
|---|---|---|---|---|---|---|---|---|---|---|---|---|---|---|---|
| 2 | DF | (Argentina) | Franco Escobar | 14 | 1 | 11 | 1 | 1 | 0 | 0 | 0 | 1 | 0 | 1 | 0 |
| 3 | DF | (Australia) | Brad Smith | 1 | 0 | 1 | 0 | 0 | 0 | 0 | 0 | 0 | 0 | 0 | 0 |
| 4 | DF | (United States) | Ethan Bartlow | 2 | 0 | 1 | 0 | 0 | 0 | 0 | 0 | 1 | 0 | 0 | 0 |
| 5 | DF | (United States) | Daniel Steres | 5 | 0 | 5 | 0 | 0 | 0 | 0 | 0 | 0 | 0 | 0 | 0 |
| 6 | MF | (Brazil) | Artur | 5 | 0 | 4 | 0 | 1 | 0 | 0 | 0 | 0 | 0 | 0 | 0 |
| 8 | MF | (Morocco) | Amine Bassi | 5 | 0 | 5 | 0 | 0 | 0 | 0 | 0 | 0 | 0 | 0 | 0 |
| 10 | FW | (Argentina) | Ezequiel Ponce | 3 | 0 | 3 | 0 | 0 | 0 | 0 | 0 | 0 | 0 | 0 | 0 |
| 11 | FW | (Paraguay) | Sebastián Ferreira | 2 | 0 | 2 | 0 | 0 | 0 | 0 | 0 | 0 | 0 | 0 | 0 |
| 12 | GK | (United States) | Steve Clark | 2 | 0 | 1 | 0 | 0 | 0 | 0 | 0 | 1 | 0 | 1 | 0 |
| 14 | FW | (United States) | McKinze Gaines | 1 | 0 | 1 | 0 | 0 | 0 | 0 | 0 | 0 | 0 | 0 | 0 |
| 15 | DF | (Ghana) | Latif Blessing | 1 | 0 | 1 | 0 | 0 | 0 | 0 | 0 | 0 | 0 | 0 | 0 |
| 16 | MF | (Mexico) | Héctor Herrera | 6 | 1 | 4 | 0 | 2 | 1 | 0 | 0 | 0 | 0 | 0 | 0 |
| 17 | FW | (United States) | Gabriel Segal | 2 | 0 | 1 | 0 | 0 | 0 | 0 | 0 | 1 | 0 | 0 | 0 |
| 18 | FW | (Nigeria) | Ibrahim Aliyu | 4 | 0 | 4 | 0 | 0 | 0 | 0 | 0 | 0 | 0 | 0 | 0 |
| 20 | MF | (Panama) | Adalberto Carrasquilla | 7 | 1 | 6 | 0 | 1 | 1 | 0 | 0 | 0 | 0 | 0 | 0 |
| 22 | DF | (United States) | Tate Schmitt | 1 | 0 | 1 | 0 | 0 | 0 | 0 | 0 | 0 | 0 | 0 | 0 |
| 25 | DF | (United States) | Griffin Dorsey | 9 | 1 | 7 | 1 | 1 | 0 | 0 | 0 | 1 | 0 | 0 | 0 |
| 27 | MF | (Poland) | Sebastian Kowalczyk | 7 | 0 | 7 | 0 | 0 | 0 | 0 | 0 | 0 | 0 | 0 | 0 |
| 28 | DF | (Denmark) | Erik Sviatchenko | 2 | 0 | 2 | 0 | 0 | 0 | 0 | 0 | 0 | 0 | 0 | 0 |
| 31 | DF | (Brazil) | Micael | 7 | 0 | 6 | 0 | 0 | 0 | 0 | 0 | 1 | 0 | 0 | 0 |
| 35 | MF | (United States) | Brooklyn Raines | 3 | 0 | 3 | 0 | 0 | 0 | 0 | 0 | 0 | 0 | 0 | 0 |

Source: Season statistics and match reports in Competitions

=== Clean sheets ===
| No. | Nat. | Player | MLS | Playoffs | Open Cup | Champions Cup | Leagues Cup | Total |
|---|---|---|---|---|---|---|---|---|
| 12 | (United States) | Steve Clark | 8 | 1 | 0 | 1 | 0 | 10 |
| 13 | (United States) | Andrew Tarbell | 1 | 0 | 0 | 0 | 1 | 2 |
| Total | | | 9 | 1 | 0 | 1 | 1 | 12 |

Source: Player Stats and match reports in Competitions

== Honors and awards ==
=== MLS Team of the Matchday ===
| Week | Player | Position | Ref. |
|---|---|---|---|
| 5 | (Nigeria) Ibrahim Aliyu | Bench | |
| 6 | (Australia) Brad Smith | DF | |
| 7 | (Argentina) Franco Escobar | DF | |
| 7 | (Brazil) Artur | Bench | |
| 9 | (United States) Ethan Bartlow | DF | |
| 9 | (United States) Ben Olsen | Coach | |
| 13 | (United States) Griffin Dorsey | DF | |
| 13 | (Mexico) Héctor Herrera | Bench | |
| 15 | (Denmark) Erik Sviatchenko | DF | |
| 17 | (United States) Andrew Tarbell | GK | |
| 17 | (Morocco) Amine Bassi | Bench | |
| 18 | (Mexico) Héctor Herrera | Bench | |
| 20 | (Argentina) Franco Escobar | DF | |
| 21 | (Ghana) Latif Blessing | MF | |
| 22 | (Paraguay) Sebastián Ferreira | FW | |
| 23 | (United States) Steve Clark | GK | |
| 27 | (United States) Daniel Steres | DF | |
| 28 | (United States) Griffin Dorsey | DF | |
| 30 | (Argentina) Franco Escobar | Bench | |
| 30 | (Argentina) Ezequiel Ponce | Bench | |
| 31 | (Mexico) Héctor Herrera | MF | |
| 32 | (United States) Griffin Dorsey | DF | |
| 32 | (Morocco) Amine Bassi | Bench | |
| 34 | (Panama) Adalberto Carrasquilla | MF | |
| 34 | (United States) Steve Clark | Bench | |
| 36 | (Denmark) Erik Sviatchenko | DF | |
| 36 | (Panama) Adalberto Carrasquilla | Bench | |
| 38 | (United States) Daniel Steres | DF | |

=== Dynamo team awards ===
| MVP | Defensive Player of the Year | Newcomer of the Year | Young Player of the Year | Players' Player of the Year | Ref. |
|---|---|---|---|---|---|
| (Brazil) Artur | (Brazil) Micael | (Argentina) Ezequiel Ponce | (United States) Brooklyn Raines | (Brazil) Artur | |
