= Micael (footballer, born 2000) =

Brazilian footballer (born 2000)

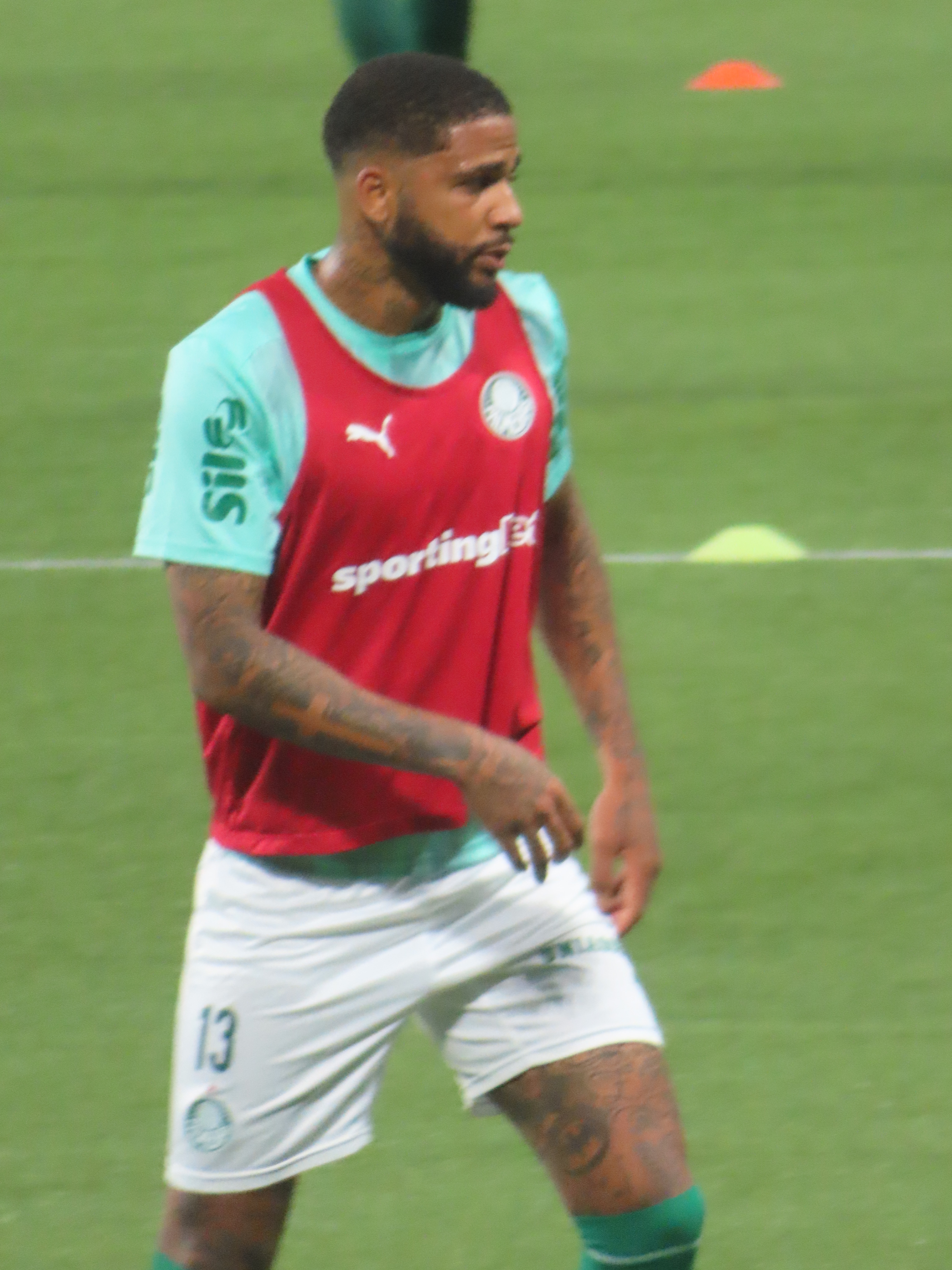
- Micael, with Palmeiras, in 2025

Personal information
- Full name: Micael dos Santos Silva
- Date of birth: 12 August 2000 (age 26)
- Place of birth: Presidente Prudente, Brazil
- Height: 1.90 m (6 ft 3 in)
- Position: Centre-back

Team information
- Current team: Inter Miami (on loan from SE Palmeiras)
- Number: 16

Youth career
- –2019: Inter de Limeira
- 2019: → Atlético Mineiro (loan)
- 2020–2021: Atlético Mineiro

Senior career*
Years	Team	Apps	(Gls)
2019	Independente de Limeira	14	(0)
2021–2023	Atlético Mineiro	2	(0)
2022	→ Houston Dynamo 2 (loan)	17	(1)
2022	→ Houston Dynamo (loan)	1	(0)
2023	Houston Dynamo 2	2	(0)
2023–2024	Houston Dynamo	56	(1)
2025–	Palmeiras	20	(0)
2026–	→ Inter Miami (loan)	17	(1)
- * Club domestic league appearances and goals as of 1 August 2026

Micael dos Santos Silva (born 12 August 2000), simply known as Micael, is a Brazilian professional footballer who plays as a centre-back for Major League Soccer club Inter Miami, on loan from Campeonato Brasileiro Série A club Palmeiras.

== Career ==
=== Early career ===
Born in Presidente Prudente, São Paulo, Micael represented Inter de Limeira as a youth before moving to cross-town rivals Independente de Limeira for the 2019 Campeonato Paulista Segunda Divisão. In July 2019, after featuring regularly with the latter side, he joined Atlético Mineiro on loan, being initially assigned to the under-20 team.

=== Atlético Mineiro ===
Micael signed a permanent deal with Galo in 2020, and helped the under-20s to win the year's Campeonato Brasileiro Sub-20 title. He made his professional debut on 9 December 2021, in a Campeonato Brasileiro Série A 4–3 away defeat to Grêmio.

=== Houston Dynamo ===
On 27 April 2022, Micael joined Houston Dynamo 2, the reserve team of the MLS side, on a season-long loan. On 13 August, he made his MLS debut for the first team in a 3–2 defeat to CF Montréal.

On 16 February 2023, Houston Dynamo announced the permanent acquisition of Micael on a two-year deal, with an option for a further two seasons. After starting the season with the B-team, he soon established himself as a first-choice in the first team.

== Career statistics ==
As of 18 February 2025

Appearances and goals by club, season and competition
Club	Season	League			State league (Note: Includes Campeonato Paulista Segunda Divisão, Campeonato Mineiro)		Cup (Note: Includes Copa do Brasil, U.S. Open Cup)		Continental		Other		Total	
Club	Season	Division	Apps	Goals	Apps	Goals	Apps	Goals	Apps	Goals	Apps	Goals	Apps	Goals
Independente de Limeira	2019	Paulista 2ª Divisão	—		14	0	—		—		—		14	0
Atlético Mineiro	2021	Série A	1	0	0	0	0	0	0	0	—		1	0
Atlético Mineiro	2022	Série A	0	0	1	0	0	0	0	0	—		1	0
Atlético Mineiro	Total		1	0	1	0	0	0	0	0	0	0	2	0
Houston Dynamo 2	2022	MLS Next Pro	17	1	—		—		—		—		17	1
Houston Dynamo 2	2023	MLS Next Pro	2	0	—		—		—		—		2	0
Houston Dynamo 2	Total		19	1	0	0	0	0	0	0	0	0	19	1
Houston Dynamo	2022	Major League Soccer	1	0	—		—		—		0	0	1	0
Houston Dynamo	2023	Major League Soccer	24	1	—		4	0	—		9 (Note: Four appearances in Leagues Cup, five appearances in MLS Cup playoffs)	0	37	1
Houston Dynamo	2024	Major League Soccer	32	0	—		1	0	4 (Note: Appearance(s) in CONCACAF Champions Cup)	0	5 (Note: Three appearances and two goals in Leagues Cup, two appearances in MLS Cup playoffs)	2	42	2
Houston Dynamo	2025	Major League Soccer	0	0	—		0	0	—		0	0	0	0
Houston Dynamo	Total		57	1	0	0	5	0	4	0	14	2	80	3
Career total			77	2	15	0	5	0	4	0	14	2	115	4

== Honours ==
Atlético Mineiro

- Campeonato Brasileiro Série A: 2021
- Copa do Brasil: 2021
- Campeonato Mineiro: 2021, 2022
- Supercopa do Brasil: 2022
- Campeonato Brasileiro Sub-20: 2020

Inter Miami

- Campeones Cup: 2026
