= Ibrahim Aliyu (footballer) =

Nigerian footballer (born 2002)

- Ibrahim Aliyu with Houston Dynamo in 2026.

Personal information
- Date of birth: 16 January 2002 (age 24)
- Place of birth: Kano, Nigeria
- Height: 1.84 m (6 ft 0 in)
- Position: Winger

Team information
- Current team: Houston Dynamo
- Number: 24

Youth career
- –2019: Oasis FC
- 2019–2020: Footwork FC
- 2020: Lokomotiva Zagreb

Senior career*
Years	Team	Apps	(Gls)
2020–2023	Lokomotiva Zagreb	79	(14)
2023–2025	Houston Dynamo	66	(9)
2025–2026	Columbus Crew	23	(3)
2026–	Houston Dynamo	13	(1)

International career^{‡}
2019	Nigeria U20	4	(0)
- * Club domestic league appearances and goals as of 12:08, 26 October 2025 (UTC) ‡ National team caps and goals as of 1:34, 27 January 2023 (UTC)

Ibrahim Aliyu (born 16 January 2002) is a Nigerian professional footballer who plays as a winger for Major League Soccer club Houston Dynamo.

== Club career ==
=== Lokomotiva Zagreb ===
Aliyu went on trial with Croatian club NK Lokomotiva Zagreb in January 2020. On 9 February the 18 year old signed with the club. He spent the remainder of the 2019–20 season playing with the youth teams.

On 2 October 2020 Aliyu made his first team debut against Istra 1961 in a Prva HNL match, coming on as a substitute in the 72nd minute for Reuben Acquah in a 0–0 draw. He scored his first goal for Lokomitiva on 1 November 2020 in a 1–1 draw with Dinamo Zagreb. Aliyu finished the season with 2 goals in 19 appearances in league play as Lokomotiva finished 8th in the table.

On 14 August 2021 he scored a brace in a 4–0 win over Istra 1961. He ended the 21–22 season with 34 appearances and 6 goals in the league to help Lokomotiva finish 5th.

On 5 March 2023 Aliyu scored a brace against Croatian powerhouse Hajduk Split in a 4–3 victory.

=== Houston Dynamo ===
On 25 April 2023 Aliyu joined Major League Soccer side Houston Dynamo on a three-year deal with team options for 2026 and 2027 for an undisclosed fee. The fee was reportedly €2.1 million. Aliyu made his debut for his new club on 10 May 2023 in a U.S. Open Cup game against Sporting KC. On 23 May He scored his first goal for the club in a 4–0 victory versus Minnesota United the U.S. Open Cup. In the following round of the Open Cup, Aliyu scored a brace to propel his team to a 4–1 win. Aliyu was part of the team that would win the 2023 U.S. Open Cup and quality for the CONCACAF Champions Cup.

=== Columbus Crew ===
On 24 April 2025, Aliyu was acquired by fellow Major League Soccer club Columbus Crew in an intra-league trade.

== Personal life ==
Aliyu has stated that is favorite football club is Real Madrid and that Kylian Mbappé is a player he looks to as a role model.

== Career statistics ==
As of 29 April 2023

Club	Season	League			National Cup (Note: Includes Croatian Football Cup and U.S. Open Cup)		League Cup (Note: Includes Leagues Cup)		Continental (Note: Includes UEFA Europa League and CONCACAF Champions Cup)		Total	
Club	Season	Division	Apps	Goals	Apps	Goals	Apps	Goals	Apps	Goals	Apps	Goals
Lokomotiva Zagreb	2020–21	HNL	19	2	2	1	—		0	0	21	3
Lokomotiva Zagreb	2021–22	HNL	34	6	1	1	—		—		35	7
Lokomotiva Zagreb	2022–23	HNL	26	6	2	1	—		—		28	7
Lokomotiva Zagreb	Total		79	14	5	3	0	0	0	0	84	17
Houston Dynamo	2023	MLS	24	3	5	3	4	0	—		33	6
Houston Dynamo	2024	MLS	34	6	1	0	3	0	4	0	42	6
Houston Dynamo	2025	MLS	8	0	0	0	0	0	—		8	0
	Total		66	9	6	3	7	0	4	0	83	12
Columbus Crew	2025	MLS	0	0	—		0	0	0	0	0	0
Career total			145	23	11	6	7	0	4	0	167	29

== Honours ==
Houston Dynamo

- U.S. Open Cup: 2023
