= Artur (footballer, born 1996) =

Brazilian footballer (born 1996)

- Artur in 2026

Personal information
- Full name: José Artur de Lima Junior
- Date of birth: 11 March 1996 (age 30)
- Place of birth: Brumado, Bahia, Brazil
- Height: 1.80 m (5 ft 11 in)
- Position: Midfielder

Team information
- Current team: Houston Dynamo
- Number: 6

Youth career
- 2012–2014: Bahia
- 2014: Juventus-SC
- 2014–2016: São Paulo

Senior career*
Years	Team	Apps	(Gls)
2016–2017	São Paulo	4	(0)
2017	→ Columbus Crew (loan)	24	(0)
2018–2022	Columbus Crew	114	(2)
2023–	Houston Dynamo	127	(3)
- * Club domestic league appearances and goals as of 2 November 2026 (UTC)

José Artur de Lima Junior (born 11 March 1996), commonly known simply as Artur, is a Brazilian professional footballer who plays as a midfielder for and captains Major League Soccer club Houston Dynamo. Previously, he played in his native Brazil for São Paulo.

While with the São Paulo U20s, Artur won the Copa do Brasil Sub-20 twice and the 2016 U-20 Copa Libertadores. He appeared sparingly for the São Paulo senior team before departing the club, first on loan and then permanently to the Columbus Crew in the United States, where he won the 2020 MLS Cup.

== Club career ==
=== São Paulo ===
Artur came through the youth ranks at Bahia, Juventus-SC, and São Paulo before breaking into the São Paulo first team in 2016. He made his senior debut for the Tricolor on 19 June 2016, part of a 2–2 draw with Flamengo, and his performance was rated highly by the Brazilian press. However, Artur rarely made it off the bench during the rest of the Série A season, making just four total appearances, all of which were in the Campeonato Brasileiro.

=== Columbus Crew ===
After impressing against Major League Soccer club Columbus Crew SC in a preseason match, Artur signed on loan with the American side on 13 February 2017, receiving the number 7 shirt. He made his debut for the club on 4 March, a substitute appearance as part of a 1–1, season-opening draw with the Chicago Fire. Although Artur had initially appeared to be a depth signing for the Crew, sitting behind Wil Trapp, Mohammed Abu, and Tony Tchani on the depth chart, he quickly forced his way into the Columbus starting lineup. Artur missed time early in the year after undergoing surgery on his left wrist, but still would end up starting 24 times during the regular season. During the 2017 MLS Cup Playoffs, Artur made three appearances. During the first leg of the conference semifinals against New York City FC, he tallied his first career goal in the 58th minute of a 4–1 Crew victory. Artur and the Crew drew 0–0 with Toronto FC in the first leg of the conference final, but lost 1–0 in the second leg, with Artur missing the game due to suspension for yellow card accumulation. Artur finished the season with a goal and three assists in 28 total appearances.

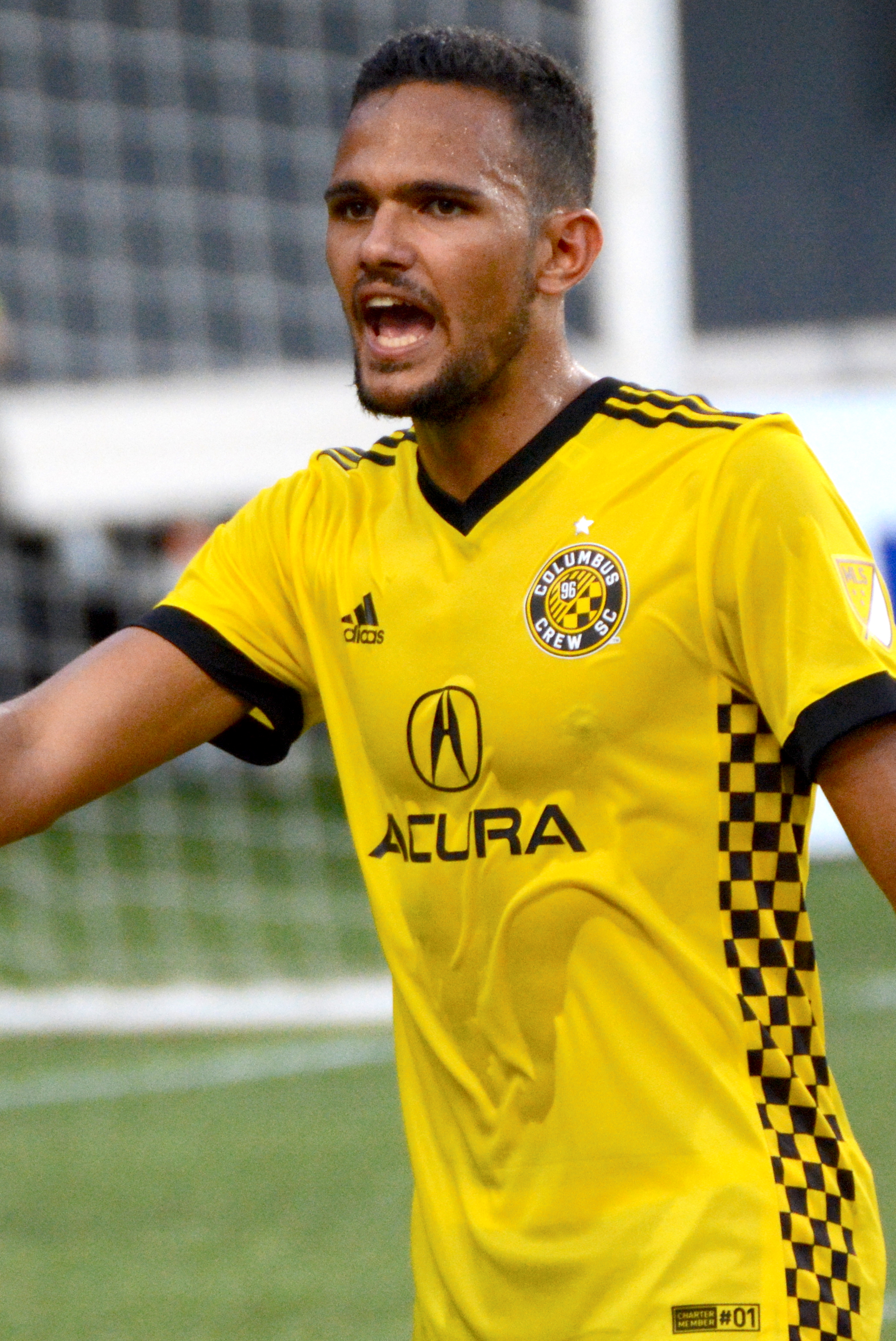
Artur in 2017.

Following the season, reports from Brazil claimed that São Paulo wanted Artur to return to Brazil upon the expiry of his loan; although Columbus had an option to buy's Artur's rights, he was reportedly being offered a salary raise in order to entice him to return to the Tricolor. Columbus officially picked up Artur's MLS contract option in early December, while still trying to complete a deal with São Paulo. The transfer was confirmed on 6 December 2017, with Columbus paying $1.5 million for 50 percent of Artur's rights; while São Paulo retained the remaining 50 percent. He made his second debut for Columbus on 3 March 2018 in a 2–0 victory over defending MLS Cup champions Toronto FC. During the season, Artur changed his squad number from 7 to 8. Commenting on the number change, he stated that the reason for the change was "because I like the number eight and my father’s lucky number is number eight also." He finished the regular season with two assists in 32 appearances, helping Columbus finish 5th in the Eastern Conference. He played every minute of the Crew's three playoff games, reaching the Conference Semifinals where they lost 3–1 on aggregate to the New York Red Bulls.

Artur was a key player for Columbus again in 2019, appearing in 30 MLS games plus both U.S. Open Cup games. It was a disappointing season for the Crew as a team, missing out on the playoffs after finishing 10th in the East.

On 18 October 2020 Artur scored his first regular season goal, helping Columbus to a 3–1 win over NYCFC. In a shortened season due to the COVID-19 pandemic, Artur appeared in 22 of a possible 23 regular season games, scoring 2 goals and recording 4 assists to help the Crew to a 3rd place finish in the Eastern Conference. He started all four of the Crew's playoff games, scoring the only goal in the Eastern Conference finals to advance to MLS Cup 2020. In the final, Artur played 87 minutes and helped the Crew to a 3–0 win over Seattle Sounders FC, winning Columbus's second ever MLS Cup.

During the 2020 offseason, Artur had sports hernia surgery to combat the lingering issue that he had since his arrival to Columbus. He appeared in 6 of the first 7 MLS matches and all 4 CONCACAF Champions League matches, but with Artur still playing through pain, the team decided to shut him down to rest. On August 2, 2021, two months after his last appearance, the club announced that Artur had undergone a second hernia surgery, ending his season. Columbus struggled, finishing 9th in the conference and missing out on the playoffs. The Crew did manage to win the 2021 Campeones Cup, defeating Cruz Azul 2–0.Artur started the first 13 MLS games of the 2022 season for Columbus before missing 2 months due to a hairline fracture in his leg. He returned to the pitch on 3 August, coming off the bench in a 2–1 loss to CF Montréal. Artur ended the season with 24 appearances as the Crew finished 8th in the Conference, two points behind the final playoff spot.

=== Houston Dynamo ===
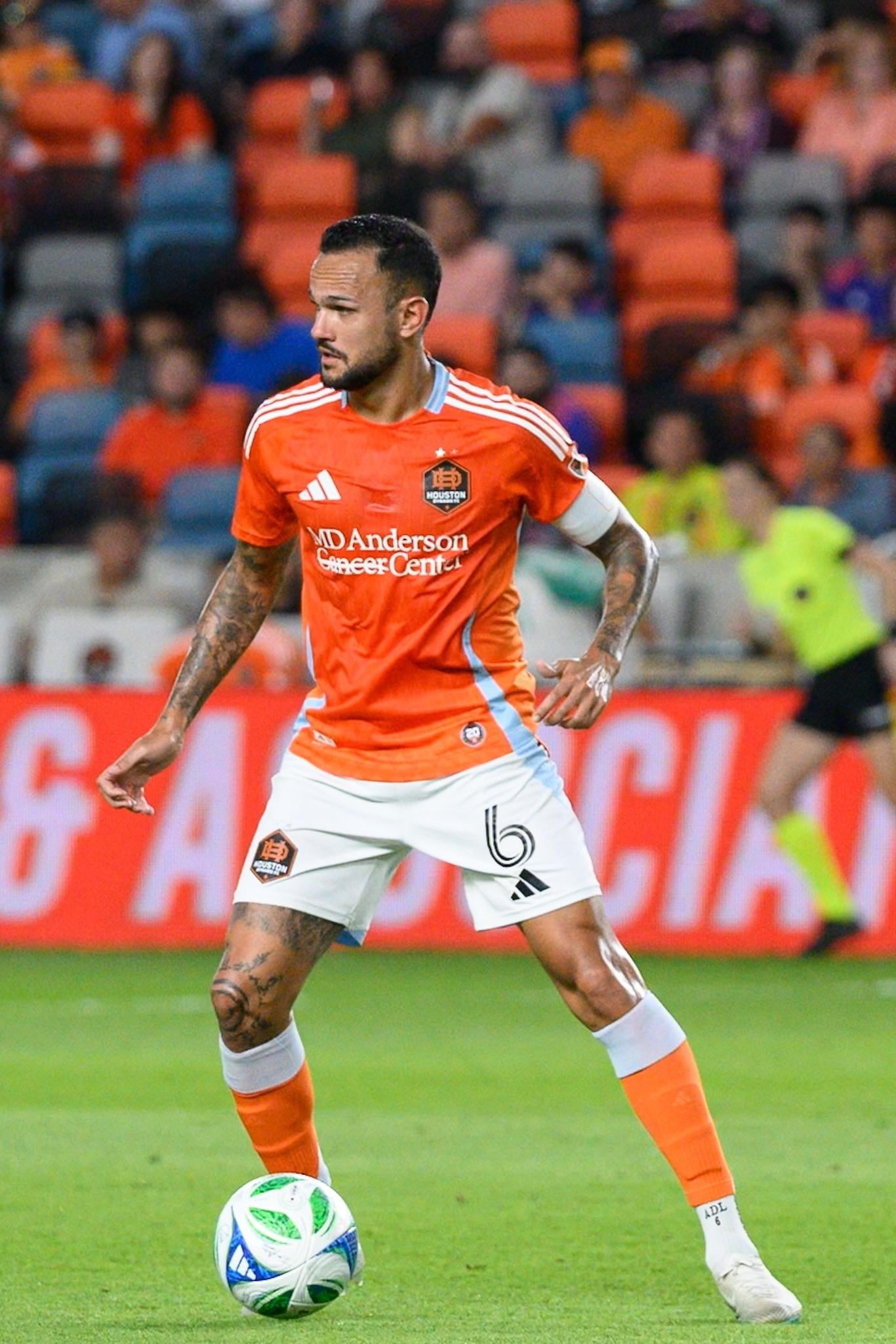
Artur with the Houston Dynamo.

On 22 November 2022, Artur was traded to the Houston Dynamo in exchange for $300,000 in General Allocation Money. He made his Dynamo debut in the opening match of the season, playing 90 minutes in a 2–1 loss to FC Cincinnati on 25 February 2023. On 27 September, the Dynamo won the 2023 U.S. Open Cup, defeating Inter Miami 2–1. He netted his only two goals of the season in back-to-back games, the first against CF Montréal on 4 October in a 1–1 draw in Montreal, and the second goal coming in a 5–1 victory versus the Colorado Rapids on 7 October. Five days later, Artur signed a 2-year extension with the Dynamo.

== Style of play ==
A strong, combative player, Artur has mainly been deployed as a defensive midfielder, and has been noted for his work ethic, strength, and leadership skills. Former Columbus Crew teammate Josh Williams stated, "To me, he’s just one of the best in the league at destroying stuff on defense, and those are guys that are normally one-sided. They’re defensive specialists. They’re basically destroyers. They seek and destroy. But Arty can seek and destroy and then start a counter for us."

== Personal life ==
Artur's brother, Norberto, is a fellow professional footballer who plays as a right back. After arriving to the United States in 2017, he began learning English from Eminem songs. In 2022, Artur became a United States citizen. Growing up, Artur admired Ronaldinho and Zinedine Zidane.

== Career statistics ==
As of 3 November 2024

Appearances and goals by club, season and competition
Club	Season	League			National Cup (Note: Includes Copa do Brasil and U.S. Open Cup)		League Cup (Note: Includes MLS Cup Playoffs)		Continental		Other		Total	
Club	Season	Division	Apps	Goals	Apps	Goals	Apps	Goals	Apps	Goals	Apps	Goals	Apps	Goals
São Paulo	2016	Série A	4	0	0	0	—		0	0	0	0	4	0
Columbus Crew (loan)	2017	MLS	24	0	1	0	3	1	—		—		28	1
Columbus Crew	2018	MLS	32	0	0	0	3	0	—		—		35	0
Columbus Crew	2019	MLS	30	0	2	0	—		—		—		32	0
Columbus Crew	2020	MLS	22	2	—		4	1	—		1 (Note: Appearance in MLS is Back Tournament knockout stage)	0	27	3
Columbus Crew	2021	MLS	6	0	—		—		4 (Note: Appearances in CONCACAF Champions League)	0	0	0	10	0
Columbus Crew	2022	MLS	24	0	0	0	—		—		—		24	0
Columbus Crew	Total		138	2	3	0	10	2	4	0	11	2	156	4
Houston Dynamo	2023	MLS	34	2	4	0	5	0	—		4 (Note: Appearances in Leagues Cup)	0	47	2
Houston Dynamo	2024	MLS	34	0	1	0	2	0	4	0	3	0	44	0
Houston Dynamo	Total		68	2	5	0	7	0	4	0	7	0	91	2
Career total			210	4	8	0	17	2	8	0	18	2	261	6

== Honours ==
Columbus Crew

- MLS Cup: 2020
- Campeones Cup: 2021

Houston Dynamo

- US Open Cup: 2023
