= Sebastian Kowalczyk =

Polish footballer (born 1998)

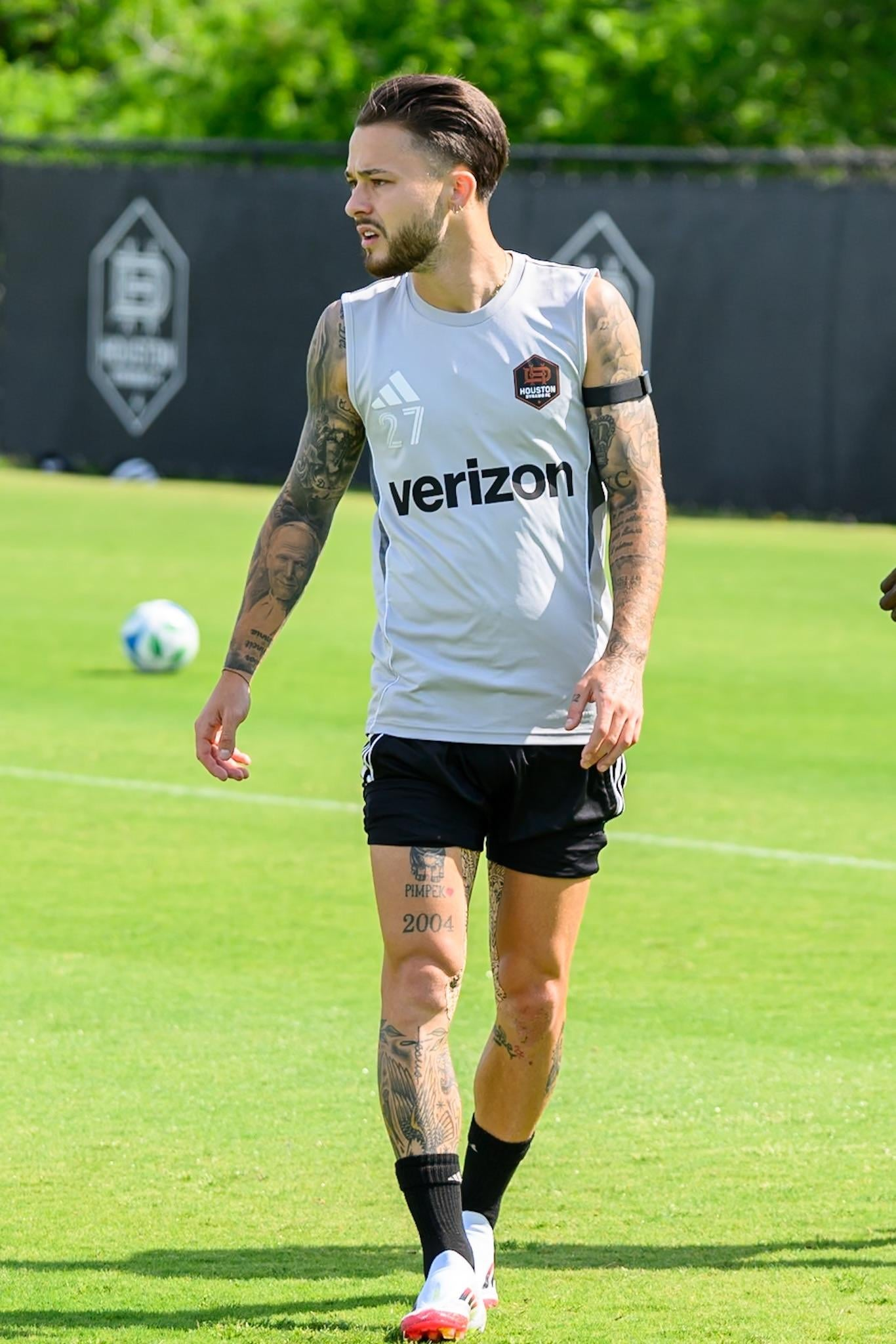
- Kowalczyk with Houston Dynamo in 2025

Personal information
- Full name: Sebastian Oskar Kowalczyk
- Date of birth: 22 August 1998 (age 28)
- Place of birth: Szczecin, Poland
- Height: 1.70 m (5 ft 7 in)
- Position: Midfielder

Team information
- Current team: Polonia Warsaw
- Number: 27

Youth career
- Salos Szczecin
- 2012–2014: Pogoń Szczecin

Senior career*
Years	Team	Apps	(Gls)
2014–2018	Pogoń Szczecin II	52	(11)
2016–2023	Pogoń Szczecin	169	(19)
2023–2025	Houston Dynamo	70	(5)
2026	Zagłębie Lubin	9	(0)
2026–	Polonia Warsaw	0	(0)

International career
2013	Poland U16	2	(0)
2015	Poland U17	3	(1)
2017–2019	Poland U20	3	(0)
2019–2020	Poland U21	4	(0)
- * Club domestic league appearances and goals as of 17:44, 29 May 2026 (UTC)

Sebastian Oskar Kowalczyk (born 22 August 1998) is a Polish professional footballer who plays as a midfielder for I liga club Polonia Warsaw.

== International career ==
He received his first call up to the senior Poland squad in March 2021 and was on the bench for the match against England.

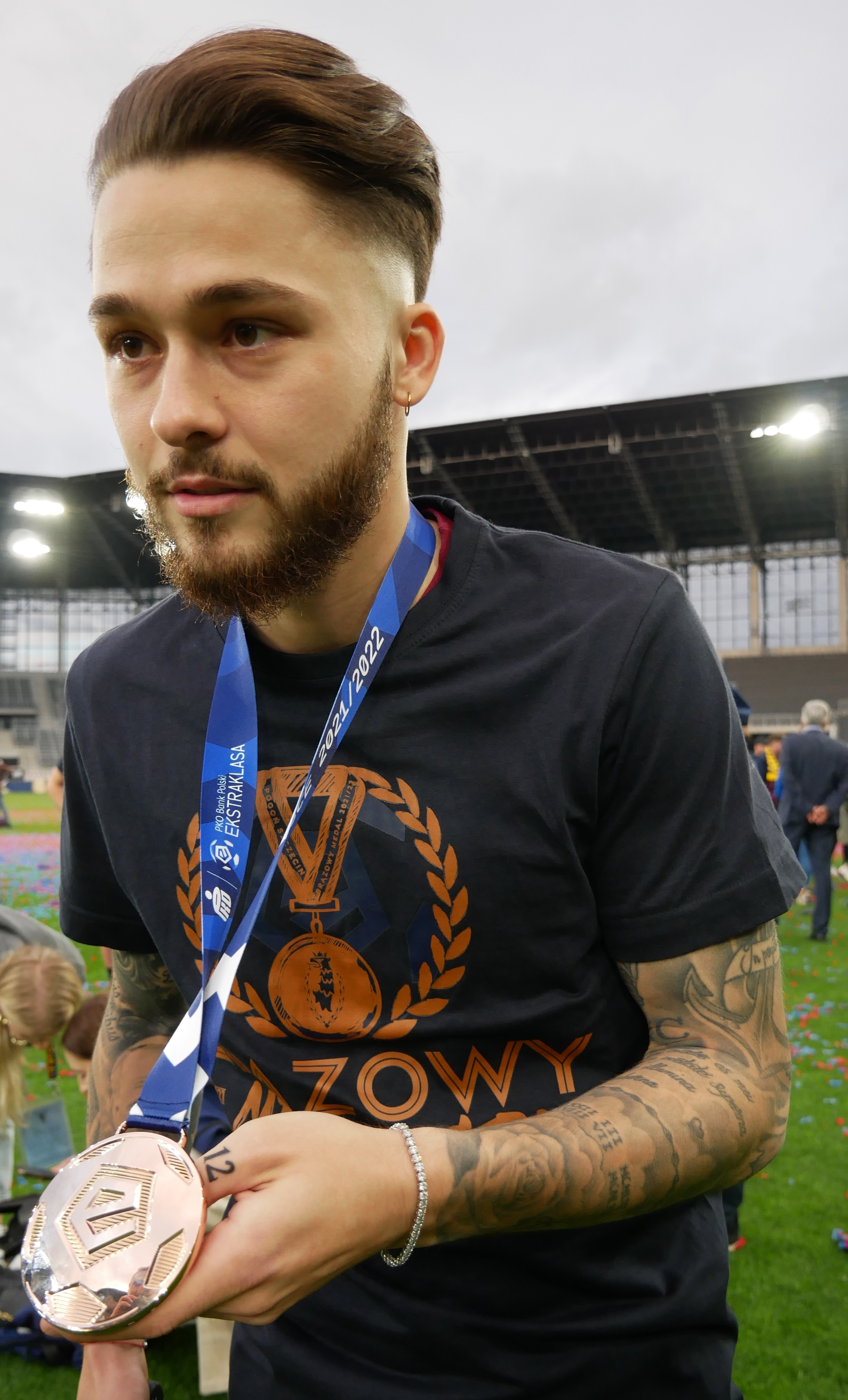
Kowalczyk with Pogoń Szczecin in 2022

== Career statistics ==
As of match played 15 May 2026

Appearances and goals by club, season and competition
Club	Season	League			National cup (Note: Includes Polish Cup, U.S. Open Cup)		Continental		Other		Total	
Club	Season	Division	Apps	Goals	Apps	Goals	Apps	Goals	Apps	Goals	Apps	Goals
Pogoń Szczecin	2016–17	Ekstraklasa	5	0	1	0	—		—		6	0
Pogoń Szczecin	2017–18	Ekstraklasa	7	0	1	0	—		—		8	0
Pogoń Szczecin	2018–19	Ekstraklasa	28	2	1	0	—		—		29	2
Pogoń Szczecin	2019–20	Ekstraklasa	35	2	2	0	—		—		37	2
Pogoń Szczecin	2020–21	Ekstraklasa	29	3	2	0	—		—		31	3
Pogoń Szczecin	2021–22	Ekstraklasa	30	6	1	0	2 (Note: Appearance(s) in UEFA Europa Conference League)	0	—		33	6
Pogoń Szczecin	2022–23	Ekstraklasa	34	6	2	0	6	0	—		40	6
Pogoń Szczecin	2023–24	Ekstraklasa	1	0	—		1	0	—		2	0
Pogoń Szczecin	Total		169	19	10	0	9	0	—		188	19
Houston Dynamo	2023	Major League Soccer	8	0	0	0	—		1 (Note: Appearance in MLS Cup playoffs)	0	9	0
Houston Dynamo	2024	Major League Soccer	33	4	1	0	4 (Note: Appearances in CONCACAF Champions Cup)	1	5 (Note: Two appearances in MLS Cup playoffs, three appearances in Leagues Cup)	0	43	5
Houston Dynamo	2025	Major League Soccer	29	1	2	1	—		3 (Note: Appearances in Leagues Cup)	0	34	2
Houston Dynamo	Total		70	5	3	0	4	1	9	0	86	7
Zagłębie Lubin	2025–26	Ekstraklasa	9	0	—		—		—		9	0
Polonia Warsaw	2026–27	I liga	0	0	0	0	—		—		0	0
Career totals			248	24	13	1	13	1	9	0	283	26

== Honours ==
Individual

- Ekstraklasa Young Player of the Month: October 2018
