= Andrew Tarbell =

American soccer player (born 1993)

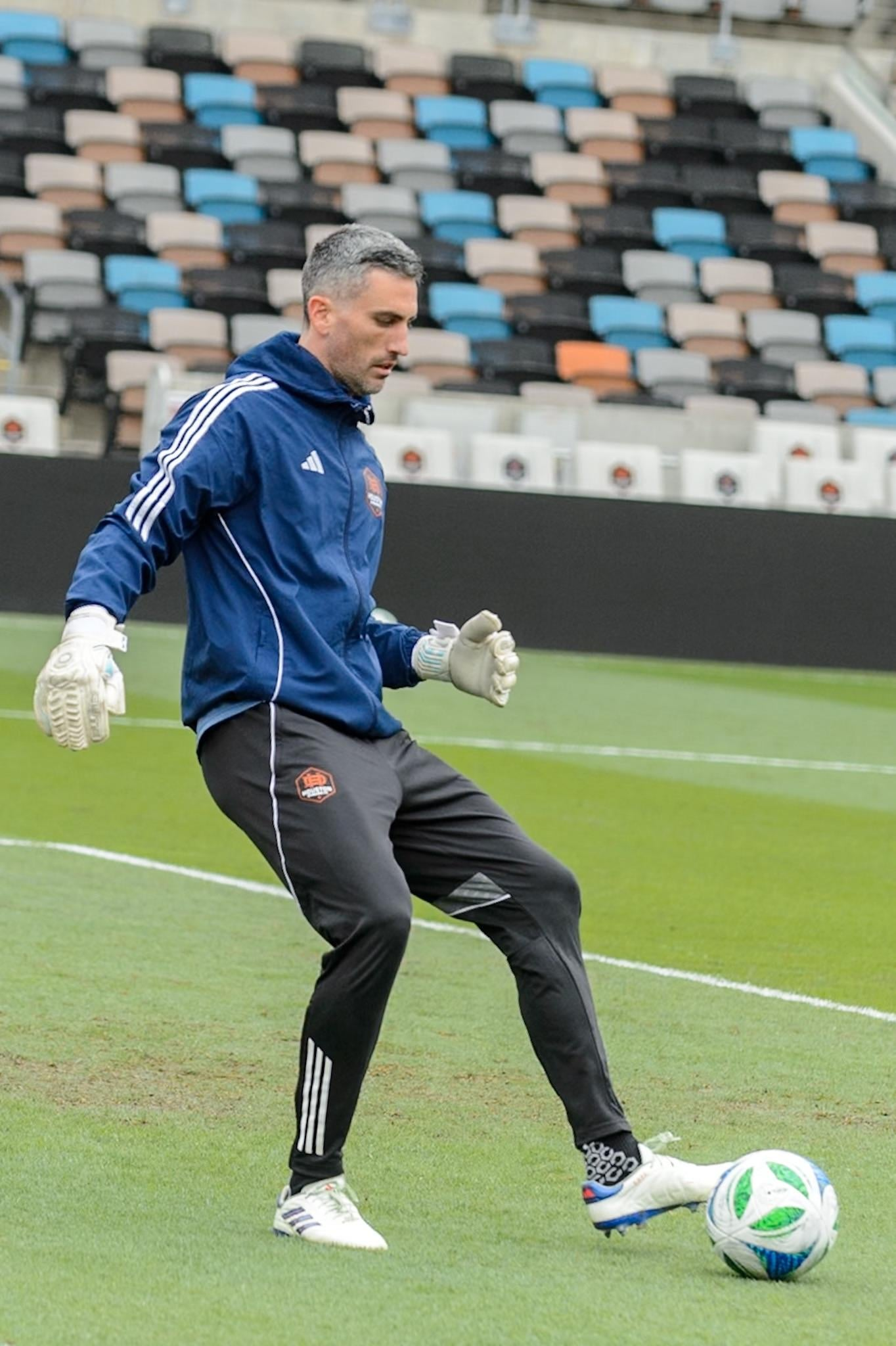
- Tarbell with Houston Dynamo in 2025

Personal information
- Full name: Andrew Gifford Tarbell
- Date of birth: October 7, 1993 (age 33)
- Place of birth: Mandeville, Louisiana, US
- Height: 6 ft 3 in (1.91 m)
- Position: Goalkeeper

Youth career
- 2004–2012: Mandeville Soccer Club Lakers

College career
Years	Team	Apps	(Gls)
2012–2015	Clemson Tigers	56	(0)

Senior career*
Years	Team	Apps	(Gls)
2010–2011	New Orleans Jesters	12	(0)
2016–2020	San Jose Earthquakes	41	(0)
2017	→ Reno 1868 (loan)	5	(0)
2020	Columbus Crew	7	(0)
2021–2022	Austin FC	5	(0)
2023–2025	Houston Dynamo	9	(0)
2023	→ Houston Dynamo 2 (loan)	4	(0)
- * Club domestic league appearances and goals as of 18:35, 18 May 2025 (UTC)

Andrew Gifford Tarbell (born October 7, 1993) is an American professional soccer player who plays as a goalkeeper.

== Early career and college ==
Born in Mandeville, Louisiana, Tarbell is graduate of Fontainebleau High School where he played soccer, baseball, and threw the javelin. During his junior and senior years, he also played for the New Orleans Jesters.

Tarbell spent his entire college career at Clemson University. He started 55 games during his four-year career with the Tigers and led them to an ACC Tournament title in 2014 and was named to the All-ACC First team. In 2015, Tarbell led the Tigers to the National Title game, where they lost to Stanford. He was selected to the College Cup All-Tournament Team for his efforts. He was also named to the All-ACC First team for a second time. At the conclusion of the season, Tarbell elected to leave Clemson early and signed a Generation Adidas contract with Major League Soccer, allowing him to be selected in the MLS SuperDraft.

== Professional ==
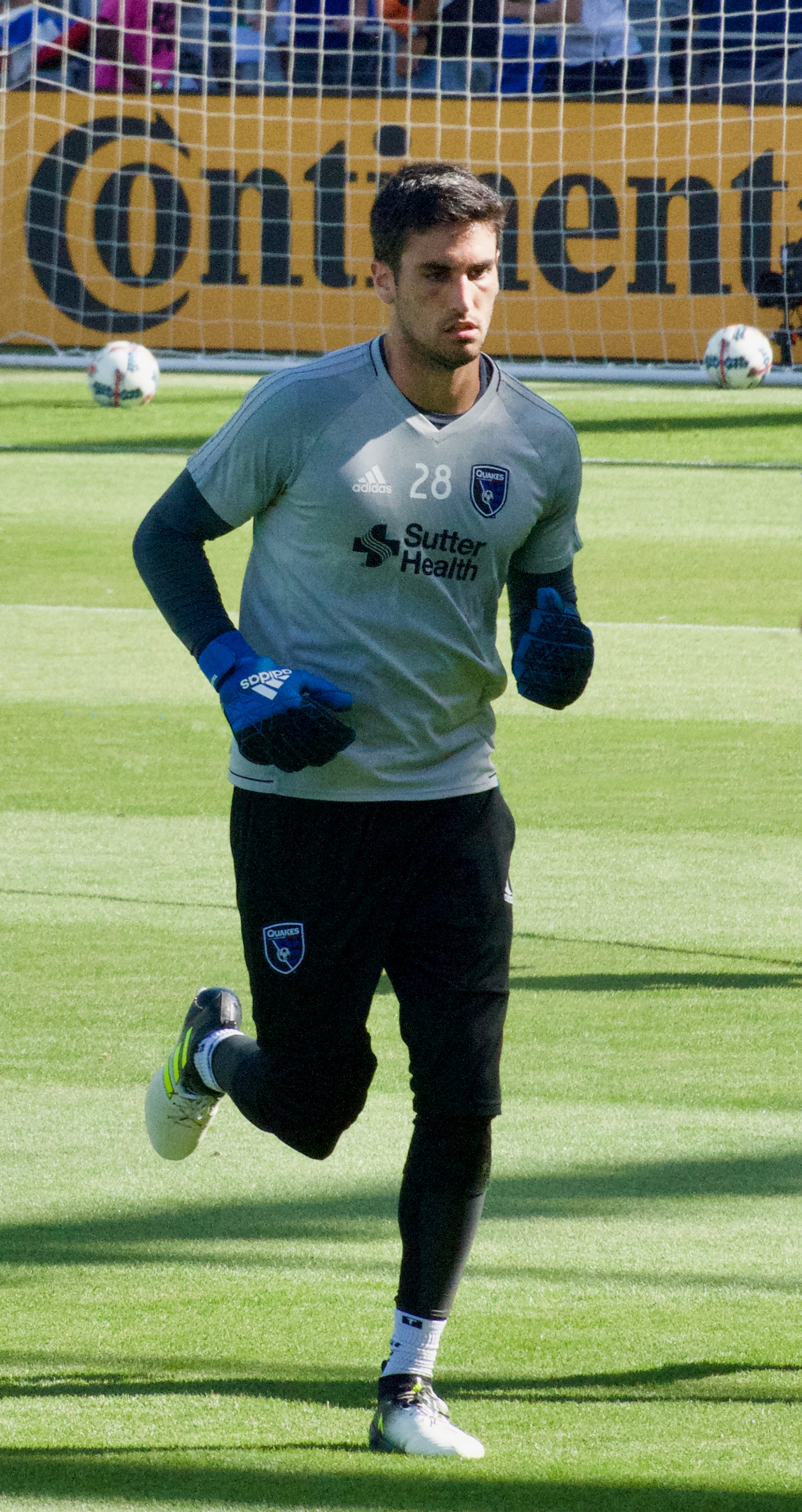
Warming up at Avaya Stadium.

=== San Jose Earthquakes ===
Tarbell was drafted 8th overall in the 2016 MLS SuperDraft by the San Jose Earthquakes. He made his professional debut on August 27 in a match against the Columbus Crew, coming on late in the first half for David Bingham who suffered a back injury. The match ended in a 2–0 loss.

During the first half of the 2017 season, Tarbell made zero appearances for San Jose, instead going on loan to affiliate side Reno 1868 in the USL Championship. He appeared for Reno for five games, including making his debut for the club on the first match of the season. Tarbell made his starting debut for San Jose in a U.S. Open Cup match on June 16 versus the San Francisco Deltas, keeping a clean sheet in a 2–0 win. Tarbell made a career-high eleven saves in San Jose's U.S. Open Cup semifinal loss against Sporting Kansas City, in addition to saving Benny Feilhaber's penalty during sudden death, on August 9, 2017. This performance, along with a struggling David Bingham in goal, helped earn him his first MLS start three days later on August 12 against the Houston Dynamo. During the match he saved a penalty, this time from Cubo Torres. He won MLS Save of the Week for saving a shot taken by Romell Quioto in this same match. A few weeks later, Tarbell won his second MLS Save of the Week, this time versus Toronto FC on September 9. At the conclusion of the season, Tarbell had surgery to repair a sports hernia.

On July 28, 2018, Tarbell was given the captain's armband for the first time, as he helped lead the Earthquakes to "one of the best performances for this season." He made his last appearance for the club on June 20, 2019 in a 3–1 U.S. Open Cup loss at Los Angeles FC.

=== Columbus Crew ===
In February 2020, Tarbell was traded to the Columbus Crew for $75,000 in allocation money. Tarbell made his debut for the Columbus Crew in the 2020 MLS is Back Tournament. During the 2020 playoffs, after incumbent starter Eloy Room missed two straight games due to COVID-19, Tarbell was thrust into the role, keeping clean sheets in both games that he played; a 2–0 win versus Nashville SC in the Eastern Conference semifinals, and a 1–0 win versus the New England Revolution in the Eastern Conference finals. During the MLS Cup final, Tarbell was on the bench as Columbus went on to win 3–0, giving him his first trophy. Following the season, Tarbell's contract optioned was declined by Columbus.

=== Austin FC ===
On December 23, 2020, Tarbell signed with Austin FC ahead of their inaugural season in 2021. He made his debut for Austin on September 29, 2021, in a 3–0 loss away to the Colorado Rapids. On April 30, 2022, he replaced an injured Brad Stuver in the 8th minute and played rest of the match as Austin was able to defeat the Houston Dynamo 2–1. Tarbell was released by Austin following their 2022 season.

=== Houston Dynamo FC ===
On November 23, 2022, Tarbell signed a two-year deal with the Houston Dynamo ahead of the 2023 season. Tarbell was the starting goalkeeper for the team that won the 2023 U.S. Open Cup, including captaining his side to a 1–0 victory while down a man in the fourth round against Sporting Kansas City. After starting the first four matches of the 2025 season, Tarbell sustained a knee injury that required season-ending surgery. Houston declined his contract option following the 2025 season.

== Style of play ==
In an interview with MLSsoccer.com, Tarbell spoke about his style of play: “I think I carry a good presence about myself. I think I cover a lot of area as a goalkeeper. I think I command my box fairly well and make plays coming off my line; whether it’s on crosses or in behind the back line, I’m fairly aggressive moving around the 18-yard box. Some things I need to work on are for sure just polishing out some technique stuff, smoothing out some kicking. Those will be big areas, consistency-type things that I’ll have time to hopefully create some new habits with and get better.”

== Statistics ==
As of May 18, 2025

Club	Season	Division	League		National cup (Note: Includes U.S. Open Cup)		League cup (Note: Includes MLS Cup Playoffs)		Other (Note: All appearances in the Leagues Cup)		Total	
Club	Season	Division	Apps	Shutouts	Apps	Shutouts	Apps	Shutouts	Apps	Shutouts	Apps	Shutouts
San Jose Earthquakes	2016	MLS	1	0	—		—		—		1	0
San Jose Earthquakes	2017	MLS	11	2	4	1	1	0	—		16	3
San Jose Earthquakes	2018	MLS	29	1	1	0	0	0	—		30	1
San Jose Earthquakes	2019	MLS	0	0	2	0	0	0	—		2	0
San Jose Earthquakes	Club Total		41	3	7	1	1	0	—		49	4
Reno 1868 FC (loan)	2017	USL Championship	5	1	—		—		—		5	1
Columbus Crew	2020	MLS	7	2	—		2	2	—		9	4
Austin FC	2021	MLS	1	0	—		—		—		1	0
Austin FC	2022	MLS	4	0	1	0	—		—		5	0
Austin FC	Club Total		5	0	1	0	0	0	—		6	0
Houston Dynamo FC	2023	MLS	1	1	6	3	0	0	1	1	8	5
Houston Dynamo FC	2024	MLS	4	0	1	0	0	0	1	0	6	0
Houston Dynamo FC	2025	MLS	4	1	0	0	0	0	0	0	4	1
Houston Dynamo FC	Club total		9	2	7	3	0	0	2	1	18	6
Career total			66	8	15	4	3	2	2	1	86	15

== Honors ==
Columbus Crew

- MLS Cup: 2020

Houston Dynamo

- U.S. Open Cup: 2023
