= Brad Smith (soccer, born 1994) =

Australian soccer player

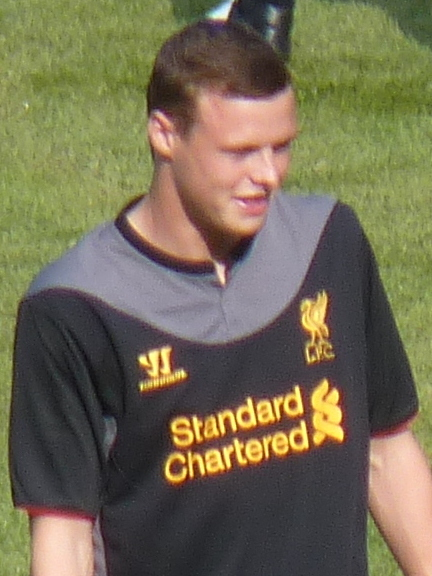
- Smith training for Liverpool in 2012

Personal information
- Full name: Bradley Shaun Smith
- Date of birth: 9 April 1994 (age 32)
- Place of birth: Penrith, New South Wales, Australia
- Height: 1.78 m (5 ft 10 in)
- Position: Left-back

Youth career
- 2008–2013: Liverpool

Senior career*
Years	Team	Apps	(Gls)
2013–2016	Liverpool	5	(0)
2014	→ Swindon Town (loan)	7	(0)
2016–2020	AFC Bournemouth	5	(0)
2018–2019	→ Seattle Sounders FC (loan)	31	(0)
2020	→ Cardiff City (loan)	3	(0)
2020–2021	Seattle Sounders FC	32	(3)
2022	D.C. United	16	(0)
2023–2024	Houston Dynamo	38	(3)
2023	→ Houston Dynamo 2 (loan)	2	(1)
2025	FC Cincinnati	17	(0)

International career^{‡}
2011	England U17	11	(1)
2012–2014	England U19	2	(0)
2014	England U20	3	(0)
2015	Australia U23	8	(1)
2014–2021	Australia	23	(0)
- * Club domestic league appearances and goals as of 19:44, 22 November 2025 (UTC) ‡ National team caps and goals as of 19:44, 22 November 2025 (UTC)

Bradley Shaun Smith (born 9 April 1994) is an Australian professional soccer player who plays as a left-back or winger for the Australia national team.

Born in Sydney, Smith moved to England to play youth soccer for Liverpool as a teenager, eventually making his professional debut for the side in 2013. He has also spent time on loan at Swindon Town in 2014 and at Seattle Sounders FC of Major League Soccer in 2018 and 2019, helping the latter win MLS Cup 2019.

Smith represented England at youth levels (eligible through his parents) but subsequently switched to play for Australia.

== Club career ==
=== Early career ===
Born in Penrith, New South Wales, Smith grew up in Ballina, New South Wales, and moved to England at the age of 14. While playing for his local high school side Smith was scouted by Liverpool and invited to join their academy.

=== Liverpool ===
A week before his debut, Smith was promoted to the first team alongside his U21 youth team partner Jordan Rossiter. On 26 December 2013, Smith was named on the Liverpool bench in a 2–1 loss at Manchester City. Three days later, he made his senior debut for Liverpool after coming on in the 59th minute, replacing the injured Joe Allen in a match against Chelsea at Stamford Bridge. He was deployed as a left winger, but was unable to make a difference to the result as Liverpool lost the match 2–1.

==== Loan to Swindon Town ====
On 7 August 2014, Smith was loaned to Swindon Town of League One on a season-long youth loan. He made his debut for the club two days later, playing the entirety of a 3–1 win over Scunthorpe United at the County Ground. He was recalled by Liverpool on 20 October due to a contract dispute, having played ten matches in total.

==== Return to Liverpool ====
In June 2015, Smith's contract expired with the player having rejected a new deal from the club however the club continued to hold his registration and as the player was under the age of 24, Liverpool would have been due a compensation fee if he had signed for another club. On 17 November 2015, Smith signed a new long-term contract with Liverpool, putting an end to his contract dispute. On 2 December, he came on as a 77th-minute substitute for Alberto Moreno in a League Cup quarter-final away to Southampton, assisting Divock Origi's hat-trick goal which confirmed a 6–1 victory.

On 8 January 2016, he started his first FA Cup match for the club in a third round match against Exeter City and scored his first senior goal for the club. In the replay of the FA Cup match against Exeter City, Smith assisted the first goal, scored by Joe Allen, in the 9th minute. Smith made his first Premier League start against AFC Bournemouth on 16 April 2016 in a 2–1 victory for his side. He made his second Premier League start on 1 May against Swansea in a 3–1 loss, and was sent off for a second yellow card in the 76th minute.

=== AFC Bournemouth ===
On 23 July, it emerged that Liverpool had accepted an offer from Bournemouth for Smith, and the move was confirmed on 27 July, after he had flown back from Liverpool's pre-season tour of the US for a medical at the south coast club. A buy-back clause was included in the transfer agreement. Smith made his competitive debut for Bournemouth in a win over Morecambe in the 2016–17 EFL Cup on 24 August 2016. He then made his Premier League debut for the club on 27 November 2016 against Arsenal. He played 81 minutes as Bournemouth lost 3–1. It was not until Boxing Day that Brad Smith made his second league appearance for Bournemouth starting in its away match to Chelsea. Smith had only limited opportunities in his first season at Bournemouth, with Charlie Daniels preferred at left back.

=== Seattle Sounders FC ===
On 8 August 2018, Smith was loaned to Seattle Sounders FC in Major League Soccer. Smith quickly became popular with Sounders supporters for his ability to get forward and combine with teammates, tallying 7 assists in 31 regular-season appearances.

Smith was initially loaned to the Sounders for the duration of a year, with a return to Bournemouth set on 31 July 2019. However, the Sounders and Bournemouth agreed to extend the loan until the end of the 2019 MLS season. Smith started each game during the team's run in the 2019 MLS Cup Playoffs, helping the Sounders reach their third MLS Cup Final in four years. On 10 November 2019, Smith started in the 2019 MLS Cup Final, which the Sounders would win. Smith became the first Australian footballer to lift the MLS Cup trophy.

=== Cardiff City ===
On 30 January 2020, Smith joined Championship side Cardiff City on loan for the remainder of the 2019–20 season.

=== Return to Seattle Sounders FC ===
On 17 September 2020, Smith returned to Seattle Sounders FC in Major League Soccer, this time on a permanent basis.

=== D.C. United ===
On 27 January 2022, Smith was traded to D.C. United in exchange for $750,000 of General Allocation Money. Following the 2022 season, his contract option was declined by D.C. United.

=== Houston Dynamo ===
On 6 January 2023, Smith joined Major League Soccer side Houston Dynamo as a free agent, helping the club to win the 2023 U.S. Open Cup in his first season. On 7 November 2024, his contract option was declined by Houston following their 2024 season.

=== FC Cincinnati ===
On 14 March 2025, Smith signed with FC Cincinnati through 2025 with an option for 2026. On 26 November, the team announced that they had declined Smith's contract option.

== International ==
Although he was born in Australia, Smith was also eligible to play for England as his parents are English. Smith represented the England under-17 side at the 2011 FIFA U-17 World Cup and made his England U20 debut at the end of the 2013–14 season. On 21 August 2014, Smith was named in the Socceroos squad to face Belgium and Saudi Arabia. He completed his change of eligibility to Australia against Belgium on 4 September 2014.

== Career statistics ==
=== Club ===
As of match played 23 August 2025

Club	Season	League			National cup (Note: Includes FA Cup and U.S. Open Cup)		League cup (Note: Includes EFL Cup and Leagues Cup)		Continental		Other		Total	
Club	Season	Division	Apps	Goals	Apps	Goals	Apps	Goals	Apps	Goals	Apps	Goals	Apps	Goals
Liverpool	2013–14	Premier League	1	0	0	0	0	0	0	0	—		1	0
Liverpool	2014–15	Premier League	0	0	0	0	0	0	0	0	—		0	0
Liverpool	2015–16	Premier League	4	0	4	1	1	0	1 (Note: Appearance in UEFA Europa League)	0	—		10	1
Liverpool	Total		5	0	4	1	1	0	1	0	0	0	11	1
Swindon Town (loan)	2014–15	League One	7	0	0	0	2	0	—		1 (Note: Appearance in Football League Trophy)	0	10	0
AFC Bournemouth	2016–17	Premier League	5	0	1	0	2	0	0	0	—		8	0
AFC Bournemouth	2017–18	Premier League	0	0	1	0	2	0	0	0	—		3	0
AFC Bournemouth	Total		5	0	2	0	4	0	0	0	—		11	0
Seattle Sounders FC (loan)	2018	MLS	6	0	0	0	0	0	0	0	—		6	0
Seattle Sounders FC (loan)	2019	MLS	25	0	1	0	—		0	0	4 (Note: Appearances in MLS Cup Playoffs)	0	30	0
Seattle Sounders FC (loan)	Total		31	0	1	0	—		—		4	0	36	0
Cardiff City (loan)	2019–20	Championship	3	0	0	0	0	0	—		—		3	0
Seattle Sounders FC	2020	MLS	5	0	0	0	—		—		4	0	9	0
Seattle Sounders FC	2021	MLS	13	3	0	0	—		0	0	—		13	3
Seattle Sounders FC	Total		18	3	0	0	0	0	0	0	4	0	22	3
D.C. United	2022	MLS	16	0	0	0	—		0	0	—		16	0
Houston Dynamo	2023	MLS	18	1	4	0	2	0	—		3	0	27	1
Houston Dynamo	2024	MLS	20	2	1	0	—		4 (Note: Appearances in CONCACAF Champions Cup)	0	—		25	2
Houston Dynamo	Total		38	3	5	0	2	0	4	0	3	0	52	3
Houston Dynamo 2	2023	MLS Next Pro	2	1	—		—		—		—		2	1
FC Cincinnati	2025	MLS	17	0	—		3	0	—		—		20	0
Career total			142	7	12	1	12	0	5	0	12	0	183	8

=== International ===
As of match played 14 November 2019

Appearances and goals by national team and year
National team	Year	Apps	Goals
Australia	2014	4	0
Australia	2016	10	0
Australia	2017	5	0
Australia	2019	3	0
Australia	2021	1	0
Total	23	0	0

== Honours ==
Seattle Sounders

- MLS Cup: 2019

Houston Dynamo

- U.S. Open Cup: 2023

Individual

- Liverpool Academy Player of the Season: 2015–16

== See also ==
- List of foreign Premier League players
- List of Liverpool F.C. players (1–24 appearances)
