= Jefferson Valverde =

Ecuadorian footballer (born 1999)

Personal information
- Full name: Jefferson Laider Valverde Arboleda
- Date of birth: 4 May 1999 (age 27)
- Place of birth: Guayaquil, Ecuador
- Height: 1.76 m (5 ft 9 in)
- Position: Midfielder

Team information
- Current team: Delfín (on loan from Houston Dynamo)
- Number: 16

Senior career*
Years	Team	Apps	(Gls)
2020	Toreros FC	4	(0)
2021	Búhos ULVR	25	(2)
2022	Atlético Santo Domingo	21	(0)
2023	El Nacional	15	(0)
2023–2024	Liga de Quito	4	(0)
2024–	Houston Dynamo	1	(0)
2024–	→ Houston Dynamo 2 (loan)	15	(0)
2025	→ Orense (loan)	17	(0)
2026–	→ Delfín (loan)	6	(0)
- * Club domestic league appearances and goals as of 21 March 2026

Jefferson Laider Valverde Arboleda (born 4 May 1999) is an Ecuadorian professional footballer who plays as a midfielder for Delfín, on loan from Houston Dynamo.

== Career ==
In 2022, Valverde signed for Ecuadorian side Atlético Santo Domingo. He was described "stood out" while playing for the club.

In 2023, he signed for Ecuadorian side El Nacional. He was regarded as one of the club's most important players.

== Style of play ==
Valverde mainly operates as a midfielder. He is known for his tackling ability.

== Career statistics ==
As of match played 21 March 2026

Appearances and goals by club, season and competition
Club	Season	League			National cup		Continental		Total	
Club	Season	Division	Apps	Goals	Apps	Goals	Apps	Goals	Apps	Goals
Toreros FC	2020	Segunda Categoría	4	0	—		—		4	0
Búhos ULVR	2020	Segunda Categoría	12	0	—		—		12	0
Búhos ULVR	2021	Ecuadorian Serie B	13	2	—		—		13	2
Búhos ULVR	Total		25	2	0	0	0	0	25	2
Atlético Santo Domingo	2022	Ecuadorian Serie B	21	0	—		—		21	0
El Nacional	2023	Ecuadorian Serie A	15	0	0	0	4	0	19	0
Liga de Quito	2023	Ecuadorian Serie A	3	0	0	0	3	0	6	0
Liga de Quito	2024	Ecuadorian Serie A	1	0	0	0	1	0	2	0
Liga de Quito	Total		4	0	0	0	4	0	8	0
Houston Dynamo 2	2024	MLS Next Pro	15	0	—		—		15	0
Houston Dynamo	2024	Major League Soccer	1	0	0	0	0	0	1	0
Orense	2025	Ecuadorian Serie A	17	0	0	0	1	0	18	0
Delfín	2026	Ecuadorian Serie A	6	0	0	0	0	0	6	0
Career total			108	2	0	0	9	0	117	2
