= 2001–02 UEFA Cup first round =

The 2001–02 UEFA Cup first round was played from 11 to 27 September 2001. The round consisted of 48 ties, with the winners advancing to the second round of the 2001–02 UEFA Cup.

All times are CEST (UTC+2), as listed by UEFA.

== Draw ==
The draw was held on 24 August 2001, 12:30 CEST, at the Grimaldi Forum in Monaco. Teams were divided into geographical groups, each with seeded and unseeded pots.

In the draw, UEFA mistakenly omitted Croatian side Varteks as a seeded team. UEFA later apologized, but clarified that the draw result was final.

== Summary ==
The first round featured the 41 winners of the qualifying round, joined by 36 directly qualified teams, the 16 losers of the Champions League third qualifying round and the 3 winners for the Intertoto Cup. The first legs were played on 11, 18, 19 and 20 September, and the second legs were played on 25 and 27 September 2001.

The matches scheduled for 12 September were postponed due to the September 11 attacks. Most of the postponed fixtures were rescheduled for 20 September, with all matches observing a moment of silence.

Team 1	Agg.	Team 2	1st leg	2nd leg
Inter Slovnaft Bratislava (Slovakia)	1–3	(Bulgaria) Litex Lovech	1–0	0–3
Internazionale (Italy)	6–0	(Romania) Brașov	3–0	3–0
Servette (Switzerland)	2–1	(Czech Republic) Slavia Prague	1–0	1–1
Roda JC (Netherlands)	6–1	(Iceland) Fylkir	3–0	3–1
CSKA Kyiv (Ukraine)	3–2	(Federal Republic of Yugoslavia) Red Star Belgrade	3–2	0–0
Gençlerbirliği (Turkey)	1–2	(Sweden) Halmstads BK	1–1	0–1
AEK Athens (Greece)	4–3	(Scotland) Hibernian	2–0	2–3 (a.e.t.)
Olimpija Ljubljana (Slovenia)	2–4	(Denmark) Brøndby	2–4	0–0
Utrecht (Netherlands)	6–3	(Austria) GAK	3–0	3–3
Slovan Liberec (Czech Republic)	2–1	(Slovakia) Slovan Bratislava	2–0	0–1
Copenhagen (Denmark)	4–2	(Federal Republic of Yugoslavia) Obilić	2–0	2–2
CSKA Sofia (Bulgaria)	4–2	(Ukraine) Shakhtar Donetsk	3–0	1–2
Standard Liège (Belgium)	4–2	(France) Strasbourg	2–0	2–2
BATE Borisov (Belarus)	0–6	(Italy) Milan	0–2	0–4
Chernomorets Novorossiysk (Russia)	0–6	(Spain) Valencia	0–1	0–5
Aston Villa (England)	3–3 (a)	(Croatia) Varteks	2–3	1–0
Parma (Italy)	3–0	(Finland) HJK	1–0	2–0
HIT Gorica (Slovenia)	1–3	(Croatia) Osijek	1–2	0–1
Ipswich Town (England)	3–2	(Russia) Torpedo Moscow	1–1	2–1
Kilmarnock (Scotland)	1–3	(Norway) Viking	1–1	0–2
Ajax (Netherlands)	5–0	(Cyprus) Apollon Limassol	2–0	3–0
Zaragoza (Spain)	5–1	(Denmark) Silkeborg	3–0	2–1
Dinamo București (Romania)	2–6	(Switzerland) Grasshopper	1–3	1–3
Marila Příbram (Czech Republic)	5–3	(France) Sedan	4–0	1–3
Troyes (France)	6–2	(Slovakia) Ružomberok	6–1	0–1
Legia Warsaw (Poland)	10–2	(Sweden) IF Elfsborg	4–1	6–1
Westerlo (Belgium)	0–3	(Germany) Hertha BSC	0–2	0–1
Chelsea (England)	5–0	(Bulgaria) Levski Sofia	3–0	2–0
Kärnten (Austria)	0–4	(Greece) PAOK	0–0	0–4
Dynamo Moscow (Russia)	1–0	(Malta) Birkirkara	1–0	0–0
Dnipro Dnipropetrovsk (Ukraine)	1–2	(Italy) Fiorentina	0–0	1–2
St. Gallen (Switzerland)	3–2	(Romania) Steaua București	2–1	1–1
Bordeaux (France)	6–4	(Hungary) Debrecen	5–1	1–3
Hapoel Tel Aviv (Israel)	2–1	(Turkey) Gaziantepspor	1–0	1–1
Haka (Finland)	1–4	(Germany) Union Berlin	1–1	0–3
Partizan (Federal Republic of Yugoslavia)	2–5	(Austria) Rapid Wien	1–0	1–5
Celta Vigo (Spain)	7–4	(Czech Republic) Sigma Olomouc	4–0	3–4
Midtjylland (Denmark)	2–6	(Portugal) Sporting CP	0–3	2–3
Anzhi Makhachkala (Russia)	0–1 (Note: Only one leg was played, in a neutral venue in Warsaw, Poland, due to security concerns in Russia.)	(Scotland) Rangers		
Hajduk Split (Croatia)	2–3	(Poland) Wisła Kraków	2–2	0–1
Paris Saint-Germain (France)	3–0	(Romania) Rapid București	0–0	3–0 (a.e.t.) (Note: Paris Saint-Germain were awarded a 3–0 win because there was a blackout in Bucharest at that time and the match was abandoned.)
Marítimo (Portugal)	1–3	(England) Leeds United	1–0	0–3
Olympiakos Nicosia (Cyprus)	3–9	(Belgium) Club Brugge	2–2	1–7
Odd Grenland (Norway)	3–3 (a)	(Sweden) Helsingborgs IF	2–2	1–1
Viktoria Žižkov (Czech Republic)	0–1	(Austria) Tirol Innsbruck	0–0	0–1
Dinamo Zagreb (Croatia)	3–3 (a)	(Israel) Maccabi Tel Aviv	2–2	1–1
Polonia Warsaw (Poland)	1–4	(Netherlands) Twente	1–2	0–2
Matador Púchov (Slovakia)	1–2	(Germany) SC Freiburg	0–0	1–2

== Matches ==
20 September 2001
18:30

Inter Slovnaft Bratislava (Slovakia)	1–0	(Bulgaria) Litex Lovech
Kratochvíl 54' (pen.)	Report

Štadión Pasienky, Bratislava
Attendance: 2,139
Referee: Luc Huyghe (Belgium)
27 September 2001
18:00

Litex Lovech (Bulgaria)	3–0	(Slovakia) Inter Slovnaft Bratislava
Janković 43', 44'; Petrov 86'	Report

Lovech Stadium, Lovech
Attendance: 2,600
Referee: Andy D'Urso (England)

Litex Lovech won 3–1 on aggregate.

20 September 2001
21:00

Internazionale (Italy)	3–0	(Romania) Brașov
Dalmat 23'; Kallon 31'; Di Biagio 41'	Report

Stadio Nereo Rocco, Trieste
Attendance: 6,439
Referee: Fernando Carmona Méndez (Spain)
27 September 2001
15:30

Brașov (Romania)	0–3	(Italy) Internazionale
	Report	Ventola 14', 79'; Guly 36'

Stadionul Tineretului, Brașov
Attendance: 6,000
Referee: Mikko Vuorela (Finland)

Internazionale won 6–0 on aggregate.

20 September 2001
20:15

Servette (Switzerland)	1–0	(Czech Republic) Slavia Prague
Oruma 75'	Report

Charmilles Stadium, Geneva
Attendance: 4,286
Referee: Georgios Douros (Greece)
27 September 2001
20:15

Slavia Prague (Czech Republic)	1–1	(Switzerland) Servette
Petrouš 89'	Report	Oruma 13'

Stadion Evžena Rošického, Prague
Attendance: 4,698
Referee: Yuri Baskakov (Russia)

Servette won 2–1 on aggregate.

11 September 2001
18:00

Roda JC (Netherlands)	3–0	(Iceland) Fylkir
Nygaard 27'; Anastasiou 65', 70'	Report

Parkstad Limburg Stadion, Kerkrade
Attendance: 5,700
Referee: Karen Nalbandyan (Armenia)
25 September 2001
18:00

Fylkir (Iceland)	1–3	(Netherlands) Roda JC
Jóhannesson 57'	Report	Zafarin 58'; Berglund 76'; Anastasiou 88'

Laugardalsvöllur, Reykjavík
Attendance: 979
Referee: Anton Stredák (Slovakia)

Roda JC won 6–1 on aggregate.

20 September 2001
19:00

CSKA Kyiv (Ukraine)	3–2	(Federal Republic of Yugoslavia) Red Star Belgrade
Tkachenko 45'; Kostyshyn 49'; Zakarlyuka 66'	Report	Pjanović 35'; Ačimovič 68' (pen.)

Dynamo Stadium, Kyiv (Note: CSKA Kyiv played their home matches at Dynamo Stadium, Kyiv, instead of their regular stadium, CSK ZSU Stadium, Kyiv, as it did not meet UEFA requirements.)
Attendance: 2,500
Referee: Douglas McDonald (Scotland)
27 September 2001
20:00

Red Star Belgrade (Federal Republic of Yugoslavia)	0–0	(Ukraine) CSKA Kyiv
	Report

Red Star Stadium, Belgrade
Attendance: 9,734
Referee: Leif Sundell (Sweden)

CSKA Kyiv won 3–2 on aggregate.

20 September 2001
18:00

Gençlerbirliği (Turkey)	1–1	(Sweden) Halmstads BK
Youla 79'	Report	Selaković 8'

19 Mayıs Stadium, Ankara
Attendance: 7,900
Referee: Sorin Corpodean (Romania)
27 September 2001
19:30

Halmstads BK (Sweden)	1–0	(Turkey) Gençlerbirliği
Arvidsson 21'	Report

Örjans vall, Halmstad
Attendance: 2,428
Referee: Bernhard Brugger (Austria)

Halmstads BK won 2–1 on aggregate.

20 September 2001
20:15

AEK Athens (Greece)	2–0	(Scotland) Hibernian
Tsiartas 54' (pen.); Nikolaidis 66'	Report

Nikos Goumas Stadium, Nea Filadelfeia
Attendance: 15,525
Referee: Attila Hanacsek (Hungary)
27 September 2001
20:30

Hibernian (Scotland)	3–2 (a.e.t.)	(Greece) AEK Athens
Luna 52', 82'; Zitelli 114'	Report	Tsiartas 92', 105'

Easter Road, Edinburgh
Attendance: 16,647
Referee: Jacek Granat (Poland)

AEK Athens won 4–3 on aggregate.

20 September 2001
20:00

Olimpija Ljubljana (Slovenia)	2–4	(Denmark) Brøndby
Žlogar 1', 61'	Report	Bagger 34'; Johansen 54' (pen.); Niżnik 73', 75' (pen.)

Bežigrad Stadium, Ljubljana
Attendance: 1,100
Referee: Erol Ersoy (Turkey)
27 September 2001
20:45

Brøndby (Denmark)	0–0	(Slovenia) Olimpija Ljubljana
	Report

Brøndby Stadium, Brøndbyvester
Attendance: 6,596
Referee: Grzegorz Gilewski (Poland)

Brøndby won 4–2 on aggregate.

20 September 2001
20:15

Utrecht (Netherlands)	3–0	(Austria) GAK
van den Bergh 21'; Tanghe 34'; Gluščević 49'	Report

Stadion Galgenwaard, Utrecht
Attendance: 12,478
Referee: Joseph Attard (Malta)
27 September 2001
18:00

GAK (Austria)	3–3	(Netherlands) Utrecht
Bazina 4'; Brunmayr 20'; Akwuegbu 38'	Report	Kuyt 47'; Zwaanswijk 54'; Jochemsen 68'

Arnold Schwarzenegger Stadion, Graz
Attendance: 3,807
Referee: Roy Helge Olsen (Norway)

Utrecht won 6–3 on aggregate.

20 September 2001
17:30

Slovan Liberec (Czech Republic)	2–0	(Slovakia) Slovan Bratislava
Gyan 8'; Nezmar 90'	Report

Stadion u Nisy, Liberec
Attendance: 5,954
Referee: Alon Yefet (Israel)
27 September 2001
18:00

Slovan Bratislava (Slovakia)	1–0	(Czech Republic) Slovan Liberec
Mojić 22'	Report

Štadión Pasienky, Bratislava
Attendance: 2,772
Referee: Dermot Gallagher (England)

Slovan Liberec won 2–1 on aggregate.

20 September 2001
20:55

Copenhagen (Denmark)	2–0	(Federal Republic of Yugoslavia) Obilić
Fernandez 9', 67'	Report

Parken, Copenhagen
Attendance: 7,710
Referee: Bruno Coué (France)
27 September 2001
16:00

Obilić (Federal Republic of Yugoslavia)	2–2	(Denmark) Copenhagen
Vujošević 32', 47'	Report	Fernandez 75', 86'

FK Obilić Stadium, Belgrade
Attendance: 3,000
Referee: Dietmar Drabek (Austria)

Copenhagen won 4–2 on aggregate.

20 September 2001
19:00

CSKA Sofia (Bulgaria)	3–0	(Ukraine) Shakhtar Donetsk
Manchev 24', 80'; Penev 40'	Report

Balgarska Armiya Stadium, Sofia
Attendance: 11,200
Referee: Ruud Bossen (Netherlands)
27 September 2001
19:00

Shakhtar Donetsk (Ukraine)	2–1	(Bulgaria) CSKA Sofia
Zubov 30'; Vorobey 52'	Report	Deyanov 90'

Shakhtar Stadium, Donetsk
Attendance: 29,130
Referee: Andreas Schluchter (Switzerland)

CSKA Sofia won 4–2 on aggregate.

20 September 2001
20:00

Standard Liège (Belgium)	2–0	(France) Strasbourg
Moreira 40', 83'	Report

Stade Maurice Dufrasne, Liège
Attendance: 14,264
Referee: Eduardo Iturralde González (Spain)
27 September 2001
21:00

Strasbourg (France)	2–2	(Belgium) Standard Liège
Ljuboja 5', 37'	Report	Goosens 57'; Vandooren 60'

Stade de la Meinau, Strasbourg
Attendance: 12,300
Referee: Drago Kos (Slovenia)

Standard Liège won 4–2 on aggregate.

20 September 2001
17:30

BATE Borisov (Belarus)	0–2	(Italy) Milan
	Report	Shevchenko 64'; Moreno 88'

Dinamo Stadium, Minsk
Attendance: 14,750
Referee: Steve Dunn (England)
27 September 2001
20:45

Milan (Italy)	4–0	(Belarus) BATE Borisov
Rui Costa 21'; Moreno 45'; Sarr 56'; Inzaghi 74' (pen.)	Report

San Siro, Milan
Attendance: 14,228
Referee: Franz-Xaver Wack (Germany)

Milan won 6–0 on aggregate.

19 September 2001
18:00

Chernomorets Novorossiysk (Russia)	0–1	(Spain) Valencia
	Report	Mista 55'

Central Stadium, Novorossiysk
Attendance: 9,036
Referee: Fiorenzo Treossi (Italy)
27 September 2001
21:30

Valencia (Spain)	5–0	(Russia) Chernomorets Novorossiysk
Sánchez 7', 23'; A. Ilie 18'; Salva 53'; Rufete 69'	Report

Estadio de Mestalla, Valencia
Attendance: 24,300
Referee: Dick van Egmond (Netherlands)

Valencia won 6–0 on aggregate.

20 September 2001
20:45

Aston Villa (England)	2–3	(Croatia) Varteks
Ángel 53', 68'	Report	Bjelanović 43', 85'; Karić 63'

Villa Park, Birmingham
Attendance: 27,132
Referee: Paulo Costa (Portugal)
27 September 2001
21:05

Varteks (Croatia)	0–1	(England) Aston Villa
	Report	Hadji 90+2'

Stadion Varteks, Varaždin
Attendance: 8,000
Referee: Nicolai Vollquartz (Denmark)

3–3 on aggregate; Varteks won on away goals.

20 September 2001
18:30

Parma (Italy)	1–0	(Finland) HJK
Milošević 21' (pen.)	Report

Stadio Ennio Tardini, Parma
Attendance: 2,670
Referee: Alan Freeland (Scotland)
27 September 2001
18:00

HJK (Finland)	0–2	(Italy) Parma
	Report	Marchionni 79'; Bonazzoli 90'

Finnair Stadium, Helsinki
Attendance: 7,588
Referee: Tomasz Mikulski (Poland)

Parma won 3–0 on aggregate.

11 September 2001
16:30

HIT Gorica (Slovenia)	1–2	(Croatia) Osijek
Težački 57'	Report	Turković 54'; Beširević 75'

Nova Gorica Sports Park, Nova Gorica
Attendance: 800
Referee: Imankhan Sultani (Azerbaijan)
27 September 2001
17:30

Osijek (Croatia)	1–0	(Slovenia) HIT Gorica
Vuka 64'	Report

Stadion Gradski vrt, Osijek
Attendance: 2,100
Referee: Juan Ansuategui Roca (Spain)

Osijek won 3–1 on aggregate.

20 September 2001
21:05

Ipswich Town (England)	1–1	(Russia) Torpedo Moscow
Bramble 85'	Report	Vyazmikin 14'

Portman Road, Ipswich
Attendance: 21,201
Referee: Orhan Erdemir (Turkey)
27 September 2001
19:00

Torpedo Moscow (Russia)	1–2	(England) Ipswich Town
Vyazmikin 66'	Report	Finidi 47'; Stewart 54' (pen.)

Luzhniki Stadium, Moscow
Attendance: 3,200
Referee: Pascal Garibian (France)

Ipswich Town won 3–2 on aggregate.

20 September 2001
20:45

Kilmarnock (Scotland)	1–1	(Norway) Viking
Dargo 73'	Report	Sanne 45'

Rugby Park, Kilmarnock
Attendance: 6,322
Referee: Ivan Dobrinov (Bulgaria)
27 September 2001
19:00

Viking (Norway)	2–0	(Scotland) Kilmarnock
Sanne 1'; Nevland 18'	Report

Stavanger Stadion, Stavanger
Attendance: 4,335
Referee: Eric Romain (Belgium)

Viking won 3–1 on aggregate.

20 September 2001
20:45

Ajax (Netherlands)	2–0	(Cyprus) Apollon Limassol
Ibrahimović 2'; Machlas 56'	Report

Amsterdam ArenA, Amsterdam
Attendance: 20,100
Referee: Dejan Stanišić (FR Yugoslavia)
27 September 2001
20:30

Apollon Limassol (Cyprus)	0–3	(Netherlands) Ajax
	Report	van der Vaart 33'; Ibrahimović 66'; Wamberto 79'

GSP Stadium, Nicosia
Attendance: 1,519
Referee: David Malcolm (Northern Ireland)

Ajax won 5–0 on aggregate.

20 September 2001
21:00

Zaragoza (Spain)	3–0	(Denmark) Silkeborg
Yordi 48'; Juanele 74'; José Ignacio 82'	Report

La Romareda, Zaragoza
Attendance: 18,000
Referee: Metin Tokat (Turkey)
27 September 2001
18:45

Silkeborg (Denmark)	1–2	(Spain) Zaragoza
Larsen 39' (pen.)	Report	Yordi 25'; Jamelli 90'

Silkeborg Stadium, Silkeborg
Attendance: 751
Referee: Ferenc Bede (Hungary)

Zaragoza won 5–1 on aggregate.

20 September 2001
16:00

Dinamo București (Romania)	1–3	(Switzerland) Grasshopper
Mihalcea 85' (pen.)	Report	Chapuisat 28'; Benjamin 81'; Núñez 87'

Stadionul Dinamo, Bucharest
Attendance: 5,000
Referee: Dani Koren (Israel)
27 September 2001
19:00

Grasshopper (Switzerland)	3–1	(Romania) Dinamo București
Baturina 18'; Chapuisat 21'; Morales 87'	Report	Mihalcea 52' (pen.)

Hardturm Stadium, Zürich
Attendance: 3,100
Referee: Miroslav Liba (Czech Republic)

Grasshopper won 6–2 on aggregate.

20 September 2001
16:30

Marila Příbram (Czech Republic)	4–0	(France) Sedan
Kulič 17', 61' (pen.), 70'; Otepka 68'	Report

Na Litavce, Příbram
Attendance: 4,252
Referee: Athanassios Briakos (Greece)
27 September 2001
19:30

Sedan (France)	3–1	(Czech Republic) Marila Příbram
N'Diefi 29'; Brogno 51', 54' (pen.)	Report	H. Siegl 48'

Stade Louis Dugauguez, Sedan
Attendance: 22,200
Referee: Lutz-Michael Fröhlich (Germany)

Marila Příbram won 5–3 on aggregate.

11 September 2001
18:00

Troyes (France)	6–1	(Slovakia) Ružomberok
Zátek 21' (o.g.); Boutal 27', 29', 57'; Meniri 52'; Loko 84'	Report	Kurty 77'

Stade de l'Aube, Troyes
Attendance: 6,011
Referee: Jon Skjervold (Norway)
27 September 2001
15:00

Ružomberok (Slovakia)	1–0	(France) Troyes
Oravec 55'	Report

Štadión pod Čebraťom, Ružomberok
Attendance: 1,242
Referee: Knud Stadsgaard (Denmark)

Troyes won 6–2 on aggregate.

20 September 2001
15:00

Legia Warsaw (Poland)	4–1	(Sweden) IF Elfsborg
Karwan 23'; Vuković 59'; Kucharski 72', 80'	Report	Klarström 42'

Stadion Wojska Polskiego, Warsaw
Attendance: 1,850
Referee: Paul Allaerts (Belgium)
27 September 2001
21:00

IF Elfsborg (Sweden)	1–6	(Poland) Legia Warsaw
Karlsson 50'	Report	Yahaya 35'; Sokołowski 54', 90'; Wróblewski 66'; Kucharski 77'; Kiełbowicz 89'

Ryavallen, Borås
Attendance: 2,602
Referee: Jaroslav Jára (Czech Republic)

Legia Warsaw won 10–2 on aggregate.

19 September 2001
18:00

Westerlo (Belgium)	0–2	(Germany) Hertha BSC
	Report	Schmidt 43'; Beinlich 90'

Het Kuipje, Westerlo
Attendance: 3,200
Referee: Sergey Shmolik (Belarus)
25 September 2001
18:00

Hertha BSC (Germany)	1–0	(Belgium) Westerlo
Marcelinho 86'	Report

Olympiastadion, Berlin
Attendance: 18,300
Referee: Mika Peltola (Finland)

Hertha BSC won 3–0 on aggregate.

20 September 2001
21:00

Chelsea (England)	3–0	(Bulgaria) Levski Sofia
Guðjohnsen 45', 74'; Lampard 90'	Report

Stamford Bridge, London
Attendance: 20,812
Referee: Helmut Fleischer (Germany)
27 September 2001
19:30

Levski Sofia (Bulgaria)	0–2	(England) Chelsea
	Report	Terry 33'; Guðjohnsen 45'

Georgi Asparuhov Stadium, Sofia
Attendance: 7,459
Referee: Martin Ingvarsson (Sweden)

Chelsea won 5–0 on aggregate.

20 September 2001
20:30

Kärnten (Austria)	0–0	(Greece) PAOK
	Report

Arnold Schwarzenegger Stadium, Graz
Attendance: 4,326
Referee: Paul McKeon (Republic of Ireland)
27 September 2001
20:00

PAOK (Greece)	4–0	(Austria) Kärnten
Konstantinidis 24', 51'; Kafes 50'; Luciano 74'	Report

Toumba Stadium, Thessaloniki
Attendance: 7,376
Referee: Paulo Paraty (Portugal)

PAOK won 4–0 on aggregate.

20 September 2001
18:00

Dynamo Moscow (Russia)	1–0	(Malta) Birkirkara
Khazov 22'	Report

Dinamo Stadium, Moscow
Attendance: 3,500
Referee: Ceri Richards (Wales)
27 September 2001
18:00

Birkirkara (Malta)	0–0	(Russia) Dynamo Moscow
	Report

Ta' Qali National Stadium, Attard
Attendance: 1,953
Referee: Roland Beck (Liechtenstein)

Dynamo Moscow won 1–0 on aggregate.

20 September 2001
19:00

Dnipro Dnipropetrovsk (Ukraine)	0–0	(Italy) Fiorentina
	Report

Stadium Meteor, Dnipropetrovsk
Attendance: 17,000
Referee: Philippe Leuba (Switzerland)
27 September 2001
22:00

Fiorentina (Italy)	2–1	(Ukraine) Dnipro Dnipropetrovsk
Adani 75'; Chiesa 76'	Report	Slabyshev 88'

Stadio Artemio Franchi, Florence
Attendance: 12,000
Referee: Graham Barber (England)

Fiorentina won 2–1 on aggregate.

20 September 2001
20:00

St. Gallen (Switzerland)	2–1	(Romania) Steaua București
Batista 33'; Mokoena 53'	Report	Neaga 37'

Hardturm Stadium, Zürich
Attendance: 4,000
Referee: Gylfi Orrason (Iceland)
27 September 2001
20:00

Steaua București (Romania)	1–1	(Switzerland) St. Gallen
Răducanu 12'	Report	Guido 59'

Stadionul Steaua, Bucharest
Attendance: 7,209
Referee: Edo Trivković (Croatia)

St. Gallen won 3–2 on aggregate.

20 September 2001
21:00

Bordeaux (France)	5–1	(Hungary) Debrecen
Pauleta 12', 76'; Christian 42'; Dugarry 51', 54'	Report	Tiber 39'

Stade Chaban-Delmas, Bordeaux
Attendance: 13,958
Referee: Nikolay Ivanov (Russia)
27 September 2001
17:30

Debrecen (Hungary)	3–1	(France) Bordeaux
Plókai 43'; Kerekes 58' (pen.), 65'	Report	Pauleta 74'

Stadion Oláh Gábor Út, Debrecen
Attendance: 7,000
Referee: Víctor Esquinas Torres (Spain)

Bordeaux won 6–4 on aggregate.

20 September 2001
20:00

Hapoel Tel Aviv (Israel)	1–0	(Turkey) Gaziantepspor
Ryndyuk 89' (o.g.)	Report

Bloomfield Stadium, Tel Aviv
Attendance: 3,000
Referee: Cosimo Bolognino (Italy)
25 September 2001
18:15

Gaziantepspor (Turkey)	1–1	(Israel) Hapoel Tel Aviv
Ryndyuk 50'	Report	Osterc 12'

Kamil Ocak Stadium, Gaziantep
Attendance: 8,200
Referee: Massimo Busacca (Switzerland)

Hapoel Tel Aviv won 2–1 on aggregate.

20 September 2001
17:30

Haka (Finland)	1–1	(Germany) Union Berlin
Väisänen 13'	Report	Ristić 70'

Tehtaan kenttä, Valkeakoski
Attendance: 1,720
Referee: Emil Bozinovski (Macedonia)
27 September 2001
17:30

Union Berlin (Germany)	3–0	(Finland) Haka
Đurković 36'; Chifon 43'; Koilov 89'	Report

Friedrich-Ludwig-Jahn-Sportpark, Berlin
Attendance: 12,111
Referee: Steve Bennett (England)

Union Berlin won 4–1 on aggregate.

20 September 2001
18:00

Partizan (Federal Republic of Yugoslavia)	1–0	(Austria) Rapid Wien
Bajić 90'	Report

Partizan Stadium, Belgrade
Attendance: 15,420
Referee: Georgios Kasnaferis (Greece)
27 September 2001
20:30

Rapid Wien (Austria)	5–1	(Federal Republic of Yugoslavia) Partizan
Wallner 11', 60'; Taument 33'; Wagner 65', 71'	Report	Wagner 57' (o.g.)

Gerhard-Hanappi-Stadion, Vienna
Attendance: 15,400
Referee: Pasquale Rodomonti (Italy)

Rapid Wien won 5–2 on aggregate.

20 September 2001
21:30

Celta Vigo (Spain)	4–0	(Czech Republic) Sigma Olomouc
Karpin 41', 87'; Catanha 64' (pen.); Edu 67'	Report

Balaídos, Vigo
Attendance: 8,698
Referee: Hermann Albrecht (Germany)
27 September 2001
20:45

Sigma Olomouc (Czech Republic)	4–3	(Spain) Celta Vigo
P. Siegl 46'; Kotrys 56'; Mucha 58', 63'	Report	McCarthy 2'; Cáceres 33'; Coira 90'

Andrův stadion, Olomouc
Attendance: 6,800
Referee: Massimo De Santis (Italy)

Celta Vigo won 7–4 on aggregate.

20 September 2001
18:55

Midtjylland (Denmark)	0–3	(Portugal) Sporting CP
	Report	Babb 50'; Beto 63'; Jardel 90'

Silkeborg Stadion, Silkeborg
Attendance: 4,435
Referee: Marian Mircea Salomir (Romania)
27 September 2001
21:30

Sporting CP (Portugal)	3–2	(Denmark) Midtjylland
Jardel 4', 45'; Skriver 85' (o.g.)	Report	Lindkvist 54'; Skoubo 56'

Estádio José Alvalade, Lisbon
Attendance: 16,000
Referee: Miroslav Radoman (FR Yugoslavia)

Sporting CP won 6–2 on aggregate.

27 September 2001 (Note: The Anzhi Makhachkala v Rangers tie originally had its first leg scheduled on 13 September at Dynamo Stadium, Makhachkala, and second leg on 27 September 2001 at Ibrox Stadium, Glasgow. However, the first leg was later rescheduled to 20 September after UEFA postponed matches due to the September 11 attacks. Rangers refused to travel to Dagestan, citing security concerns due to the region's proximity to the ongoing Second Chechen War and Foreign Office advice against travel to the region. UEFA insisted the match must proceed as scheduled, and Rangers' subsequent appeal to the Court of Arbitration for Sport failed. However, UEFA ultimately reversed its decision following the deterioration of the security situation and the withdrawal of Rangers' insurance coverage. The tie was subsequently reorganized as a single match at a neutral venue, played at Polish Army Stadium, Warsaw, Poland, on 27 September.)
20:00

Anzhi Makhachkala (Russia)	0–1	(Scotland) Rangers
	Report	Konterman 84'

Polish Army Stadium, Warsaw
Attendance: 4,700
Referee: Edgar Steinborn (Germany)

20 September 2001
20:30

Hajduk Split (Croatia)	2–2	(Poland) Wisła Kraków
Deranja 22'; Srna 87'	Report	Żurawski 51'; Moskalewicz 90+2'

Stadion Poljud, Split
Attendance: 10,386
Referee: António Almeida Costa (Portugal)
27 September 2001
15:00

Wisła Kraków (Poland)	1–0	(Croatia) Hajduk Split
Frankowski 22'	Report

Stadion Miejski, Kraków
Attendance: 3,919
Referee: Georgios Borovilos (Greece)

Wisła Kraków won 3–2 on aggregate.

18 September 2001
18:00

Paris Saint-Germain (France)	0–0	(Romania) Rapid București
	Report

Parc des Princes, Paris
Attendance: 19,907
Referee: Željko Širić (Croatia)
25 September 2001
18:00

Rapid București (Romania)	0–3 (a.e.t.) Awarded (Note: Paris Saint-Germain were winning 1–0 in extra time of the second leg before Rapid București walked out. Paris Saint-Germain were later awarded a 3–0 victory for the match.)	(France) Paris Saint-Germain
	Report	Aloísio 93'

Stadionul Giulești-Valentin Stănescu, Bucharest
Attendance: 12,000
Referee: Darko Čeferin (Slovenia)

Paris Saint-Germain won 3–0 on aggregate.

20 September 2001
21:45

Marítimo (Portugal)	1–0	(England) Leeds United
Fernandes 34'	Report

Estádio dos Barreiros, Funchal
Attendance: 3,409
Referee: Jack van Hulten (Netherlands)
27 September 2001
21:00

Leeds United (England)	3–0	(Portugal) Marítimo
Keane 20'; Kewell 36'; Bakke 61'	Report

Elland Road, Leeds
Attendance: 38,125
Referee: Stefano Farina (Italy)

Leeds United won 3–1 on aggregate.

20 September 2001
19:00

Olympiakos Nicosia (Cyprus)	2–2	(Belgium) Club Brugge
Themistokleous 5'; Radosavljev 79'	Report	Verheyen 32'; Clement 69'

GSP Stadium, Nicosia
Attendance: 1,517
Referee: Ladislav Gádoši (Slovakia)
27 September 2001
20:30

Club Brugge (Belgium)	7–1	(Cyprus) Olympiakos Nicosia
Lange 21'; Sillah 26', 57'; Martens 47', 87'; Simons 69'; Čeh 90'	Report	Themistokleous 88'

Jan Breydelstadion, Bruges
Attendance: 5,365
Referee: Karel Vidlák (Czech Republic)

Club Brugge won 9–3 on aggregate.

20 September 2001
20:00

Odd Grenland (Norway)	2–2	(Sweden) Helsingborgs IF
Fevang 9'; van Ankeren 32'	Report	Hansson 23'; Santos 56'

Odd Stadion, Skien
Attendance: 3,012
Referee: Sten Kaldma (Estonia)
27 September 2001
19:00

Helsingborgs IF (Sweden)	1–1	(Norway) Odd Grenland
Santos 3'	Report	Fevang 43'

Olympia, Helsingborg
Attendance: 4,034
Referee: Sergiy Shebek (Ukraine)

3–3 on aggregate; Helsingborgs IF won on away goals.

11 September 2001
17:30

Viktoria Žižkov (Czech Republic)	0–0	(Austria) Tirol Innsbruck
	Report

FK Viktoria Stadion, Prague
Attendance: 1,326
Referee: Laurent Duhamel (France)
25 September 2001
18:00

Tirol Innsbruck (Austria)	1–0	(Czech Republic) Viktoria Žižkov
Glieder 49'	Report

Tivoli Neu, Innsbruck
Attendance: 5,100
Referee: Vasyl Melnychuk (Ukraine)

Tirol Innsbruck won 1–0 on aggregate.

20 September 2001
18:00

Dinamo Zagreb (Croatia)	2–2	(Israel) Maccabi Tel Aviv
Agić 55'; Sedloski 73'	Report	Goldberg 33'; Dego 41'

Stadion Maksimir, Zagreb
Attendance: 8,430
Referee: Bruno Derrien (France)
25 September 2001
17:00

Maccabi Tel Aviv (Israel)	1–1	(Croatia) Dinamo Zagreb
Nimni 41' (pen.)	Report	Agić 32'

Bloomfield Stadium, Tel Aviv
Attendance: 5,718
Referee: Julián Rodríguez Santiago (Spain)

3–3 on aggregate; Maccabi Tel Aviv won on away goals.

20 September 2001
18:00

Polonia Warsaw (Poland)	1–2	(Netherlands) Twente
Bąk 76'	Report	Kollmann 59'; van der Laan 85'

Stadion Miejski w Łodzi, Łódź
Attendance: 897
Referee: Uriah Rennie (England)
27 September 2001
20:15

Twente (Netherlands)	2–0	(Poland) Polonia Warsaw
Kollmann 70'; Booth 71'	Report

Arke Stadion, Enschede
Attendance: 11,500
Referee: Costas Kapitanis (Cyprus)

Twente won 4–1 on aggregate.

11 September 2001
17:30

Matador Púchov (Slovakia)	0–0	(Germany) SC Freiburg
	Report

Mestský štadión, Púchov
Attendance: 5,476
Referee: Peter Fröjdfeldt (Sweden)
27 September 2001
20:40

SC Freiburg (Germany)	2–1	(Slovakia) Matador Púchov
Coulibaly 20'; Tanko 89'	Report	Perniš 51'

Dreisamstadion, Freiburg im Breisgau
Attendance: 18,800
Referee: Yuriy Klyuchnikov (Russia)

SC Freiburg won 2–1 on aggregate.
