= 1. FC Union Berlin in European football =

German professional football club

- Club: 1. FC Union Berlin
- Seasons played: 4
- Most appearances: Rani Khedira (20)
- Top scorer: Taiwo Awoniyi (4); Robin Knoche (4)
- First entry: 1968–69 European Cup Winners' Cup (Note: Union Berlin qualified for the 1968–69 European Cup Winners' Cup after winning the FDGB-Pokal. Subsequently, the DFV withdrew all of its clubs from UEFA-sanctioned European competition for the 1968–69 season.); 2001–02 UEFA Cup
- Latest entry: 2023–24 UEFA Champions League

1. FC Union Berlin, commonly known as Union Berlin, is a German professional football club based in Berlin. The club has competed in UEFA competitions a total of four times in its history – first in the 2001–02 UEFA Cup, and then in three successive seasons between 2021–22 and 2023–24 in all three of UEFA's competitions, the Conference League, the Europa League and the Champions League.

== History ==
=== 1968–69 European Cup Winners' Cup ===
Although Union Berlin's first European campaign came in 2001–02, the club actually qualified for Europe for the first time in 1968 when, while playing in the East German DDR-Oberliga, they won the FDGB-Pokal, thus qualifying for the 1968–69 European Cup Winners' Cup. Initially drawn against FK Bor of Yugoslavia, the events of the Prague Spring in Czechoslovakia saw UEFA alter the draw to split clubs from Eastern and Western Europe. This led to Union Berlin being drawn against Dynamo Moscow of the Soviet Union. But, anger at UEFA's handling of the situation led to several socialist countries, including East Germany, withdrawing their sides from European competitions that season. (Note: The withdrawal applied to UEFA-sanctioned competitions; in addition to Union Berlin, this also saw Carl Zeiss Jena, having won the DDR-Oberliga title, miss out on their place in the European Cup. However, the Inter-Cities Fairs Cup was not a UEFA-sanctioned competition, which meant that both Hansa Rostock and Lokomotive Leipzig were able to participate in Europe that season.)

=== 2001–02 UEFA Cup ===
Union Berlin's first European foray came as a result of their reaching the 2001 DFB-Pokal final. Although Union lost the final 2–0 against Schalke, they gained a place in the following season's UEFA Cup as a result of Schalke finishing second in the Bundesliga, thus qualifying for the Champions League.

Season	Competition	Round	Opposition	Home	Attendance	Away	Attendance	Aggregate
2001–02	UEFA Cup	First round	(Finland) Haka	3–0	12,111	1–1	1,720	4–1
2001–02	UEFA Cup	Second round	(Bulgaria) Litex Lovech	0–2	11,255	0–0	3,250	0–2

=== 2021–22 UEFA Europa Conference League ===
Union Berlin were promoted to the Bundesliga for the first time in 2019. Having finished eleventh in their debut season, the club then finished seventh the following year to qualify for the inaugural season of the UEFA Europa Conference League. This was the first time they had qualified for Europe by league position, thanks to last minute winner in a final day win over RB Leipzig. Owing to the limitations of their own stadium, the club were forced to play their home games at the Olympiastadion, home to their local rivals Hertha Berlin.

Season	Competition	Round	Opposition	Home	Attendance	Away	Attendance	Aggregate
2021–22	UEFA Europa Conference League	Play-off round	(Finland) KuPS	0–0	22,159	4–0	5,632	4–0
2021–22	UEFA Europa Conference League	Group E	(Czech Republic) Slavia Prague	1–1	4,380	3–1	15,286	3rd
2021–22	UEFA Europa Conference League	Group E	(Israel) Maccabi Haifa	3–0	23,342	1–0	22,150	3rd
2021–22	UEFA Europa Conference League	Group E	(Netherlands) Feyenoord	1–2	30,000	1–3	36,100	3rd

=== 2022–23 UEFA Europa League ===
Union Berlin continued progression in the Bundesliga by finishing fifth in 2021–22, which gave them a second successive European campaign, this time in the Europa League, the club's first time in the competition since its debut European campaign. This campaign was also the first that saw Union play their European home games at their own stadium, the Stadion An der Alten Försterei.

Season	Competition	Round	Opposition	Home	Attendance	Away	Attendance	Aggregate
2022–23	UEFA Europa League	Group D	(Belgium) Union Saint-Gilloise	0–1	21,512	1–0	5,597	2nd
2022–23	UEFA Europa League	Group D	(Portugal) Braga	1–0	21,082	0–1	17,782	2nd
2022–23	UEFA Europa League	Group D	(Sweden) Malmö FF	1–0	21,800	1–0	16,057	2nd
2022–23	UEFA Europa League	Play-off	(Netherlands) Ajax	3–1	21,800	0–0	54,322	3–1
2022–23	UEFA Europa League	Round of 16	(Belgium) Union Saint-Gilloise	3–3	21,605	0–3	15,681	3–6

=== 2023–24 UEFA Champions League ===
Union Berlin's fourth-place finish in the 2022–23 Bundesliga was the club's highest ever league position to date. This allowed them a place in the 2023–24 UEFA Champions League, the first time that the club had played in Europe's premier competition. To maximise the number of supporters that could attend the club's home games in the competition, Union Berlin elected to move their home games to the Olympiastadion, rather than playing at the An der Alten Försterei.

Season	Competition	Round	Opposition	Home	Attendance	Away	Attendance	Aggregate
2023–24	UEFA Champions League	Group C	(Spain) Real Madrid	2–3	73,420	0–1	65,207	4th
2023–24	UEFA Champions League	Group C	(Portugal) Braga	2–3	73,445	1–1	15,855	4th
2023–24	UEFA Champions League	Group C	(Italy) Napoli	0–1	72,062	1–1	42,449	4th

== Overall record ==
Correct as of match played 12 December 2023, vs Real Madrid

=== Record by competition ===
Competition	Pld	W	D	L	GF	GA	GD	Best performance
UEFA Champions League	6	0	2	4	6	10	−4	Group stage (2023–24)
UEFA Europa League/UEFA Cup	14	6	4	4	14	13	+1	Round of 16 (2022–23)
UEFA Europa Conference League	8	3	2	3	12	9	+3	Group stage (2021–22)

=== Record by nation ===
Nation	Pld	W	D	L	GF	GA	GD	Opponents
Belgium	4	1	1	2	4	7	-3	Union Saint-Gilloise
Bulgaria	2	0	1	1	0	2	-2	Litex Lovech
Czech Republic	2	0	1	1	2	4	-2	Slavia Prague
Finland	4	2	2	0	8	1	+7	Haka, KuPS
Israel	2	2	0	0	4	0	+4	Maccabi Haifa
Italy	2	0	1	1	1	2	-1	Napoli
Netherlands	4	1	1	2	5	6	-1	Ajax, Feyenoord
Portugal	4	1	1	2	4	5	-1	Braga
Spain	2	0	0	2	2	4	-2	Real Madrid
Sweden	2	2	0	0	2	0	+2	Malmö FF

=== Record by match ===
Season	Competition	Round	Opposition	Home	Away	Agg.
2001–02	UEFA Cup	1R	(Finland) Haka	3–0	1–1	4–1
2001–02	UEFA Cup	2R	(Bulgaria) Litex Lovech	0–2	0–0	0–2
2021–22	UEFA Europa Conference League	PO	(Finland) KuPS	0–0	4–0	4–0
2021–22	UEFA Europa Conference League	Group E	(Czech Republic) Slavia Prague	1–1	1–3	3rd
2021–22	UEFA Europa Conference League	Group E	(Netherlands) Feyenoord	1–2	1–3	3rd
2021–22	UEFA Europa Conference League	Group E	(Israel) Maccabi Haifa	3–0	1–0	3rd
2022–23	UEFA Europa League	Group D	(Belgium) Union Saint-Gilloise	0–1	1–0	2nd
2022–23	UEFA Europa League	Group D	(Portugal) Braga	1–0	0–1	2nd
2022–23	UEFA Europa League	Group D	(Sweden) Malmö FF	1–0	1–0	2nd
2022–23	UEFA Europa League	KRPO	(Netherlands) Ajax	3–1	0–0	3–1
2022–23	UEFA Europa League	R16	(Belgium) Union Saint-Gilloise	3–3	0–3	3–6
2023–24	UEFA Champions League	Group C	(Spain) Real Madrid	2–3	0–1	4th
2023–24	UEFA Champions League	Group C	(Portugal) Braga	2–3	1–1	4th
2023–24	UEFA Champions League	Group C	(Italy) Napoli	0–1	1–1	4th

=== UEFA coefficient ===
As of 27 April 2026

Rank	Team	Points
88	(England) Leicester City	23.481
89	(Slovenia) Celje	23.000
90	(Germany) Union Berlin	23.000
91	(Poland) Raków	22.250
92	(Spain) Rayo Vallecano	22.000

== All-time goalscorers in UEFA competitions ==
- Bold indicates player is still with Union Berlin
- Italics indicates player is currently out on loan
- Correct as of match played 12 December 2023, vs (Spain) Real Madrid

The following is a list of Union Berlin's goalscorers in official UEFA competitions:

Rank	Player	Champions League	UEFA Cup / Europa League	Conference League	Total
=1	(Nigeria) Taiwo Awoniyi	0	0	4	4
=1	(Germany) Robin Knoche	0	4	0	4
3	(Suriname) Sheraldo Becker	2	1	0	3
=4	(Germany) Max Kruse	0	0	2	2
=4	(Germany) Andreas Voglsammer	0	0	2	2
=4	(Germany) Kevin Behrens	0	0	2	2
=4	(Croatia) **Josip Juranović**	0	2	0	2
=4	(Norway) Sven Michel	0	2	0	2
=9	(Bulgaria) Hristo Koilov	0	1	0	1
=9	(Germany) Sreto Ristić	0	1	0	1
=9	(Cameroon) Ferdinand Chi Fon	0	1	0	1
=9	(Serbia) Božidar Đurković	0	1	0	1
=9	(Germany) Cedric Teuchert	0	0	1	1
=9	(Poland) Tymoteusz Puchacz	0	0	1	1
=9	(Norway) Julian Ryerson	0	0	1	1
=9	(Austria) **Christopher Trimmel**	0	0	1	1
=9	(Netherlands) Danilho Doekhi	0	1	0	1
=9	(Czech Republic) Alex Král	1	0	0	1
=9	(Germany) Kevin Volland	1	0	0	1
=9	(Germany) Robin Gosens	1	0	0	1
=9	(Ivory Coast) David Fofana	1	0	0	1

== Non-UEFA competitions ==
=== Intertoto Cup ===
Season	Competition	Round	Opposition	Home	Away	Agg.
1967	Intertoto Cup	Group B7	(Denmark) KB	0–3	0–1	3rd place
1967	Intertoto Cup	Group B7	(Poland) Katowice	3–0	0–1	3rd place
1967	Intertoto Cup	Group B7	(Czechoslovakia) Union Teplice	0–1	1–1	3rd place
1986	Intertoto Cup	Group 2	(West Germany) Bayer Uerdingen	3–2	0–3	1st place
1986	Intertoto Cup	Group 2	(Switzerland) Lausanne-Sport	1–0	1–1	1st place
1986	Intertoto Cup	Group 2	(Belgium) Standard Liège	4–1	2–1	1st place
