= Ocak (name) =

Turkish surname and a given name

Ocak is a Turkish surname and a given name. People with the name include:

== Surname ==
- F. Tulga Ocak (1946–2019), Turkish academic
- Kamil Ocak (1914–1969), Turkish politician
- Murat Ocak (born 1982), Turkish football player
- Zührenaz Ocak (born 2006), Turkish female karateka

== Given name ==
- Ocak Işık Yurtçu (1945–2012), Turkish journalist

== See also ==
- Ocak (disambiguation)
