= Odžak (disambiguation) =

Odžak (which translates as chimney in Serbo-Croatian) may refer to the following places:

- Odžak, a town in the northern part of Bosnia and Herzegovina
- Odžak (Bugojno), Bosnia and Herzegovina
- Odžak (Glamoč), Bosnia and Herzegovina
- Odžak (Hadžići), Bosnia and Herzegovina
- Odžak (Ilijaš), Bosnia and Herzegovina
- Odžak (Kupres), Bosnia and Herzegovina
- Odžak (Livno), Bosnia and Herzegovina
- Odžak (Nevesinje), Bosnia and Herzegovina
- Odžak (Novo Goražde), Republika Srpska, Bosnia and Herzegovina
- Odžak (Višegrad), Bosnia and Herzegovina
- Odžak, Montenegro

== See also ==
- Odjak
- Ocak (disambiguation)
- Odžaci, a town in Serbia
