= Ocak =

Ocak may refer to:

== People ==
- Ocak (name)

== Places ==
- Ocak, Aziziye
- Ocak, Kemaliye
- Ocak, Pazar

== Others ==
- Adana 5 Ocak Stadium, multi-purpose stadium in Adana, Turkey
- Gaziantep Kamil Ocak Stadium, multi-purpose stadium in Gaziantep, Turkey
- Sönmüş Ocak, Turkish TV series
- Janissary, synonymous with Janissary Corps
- Ocak (Alevism), concept in Alevi and Bektashi Islam

== See also ==
- Odžak (disambiguation)
