= 2001–02 UEFA Cup final phase =

Tournament knockout phase

The final phase of the 2001–02 UEFA Cup began on 20 November 2001 with the third round and concluded on 8 May 2002 with the final at the Feijenoord Stadion in Rotterdam, Netherlands. The final phase involved 32 teams: the 24 teams which qualified from the second round, and the eight third-placed teams from the Champions League first group stage.

Times up to 30 March 2002 (third round to quarter-finals) were CET (UTC+1), and thereafter (semi-finals and final) CEST (UTC+2).

== Round and draw dates ==
The schedule for the competition was as follows. The draw for the third round was held at the Noga Hilton Hotel in Geneva, Switzerland, while the remaining draws were held at UEFA headquarters in Nyon, Switzerland.

Round	Draw date	First leg	Second leg
Third round	2 November 2001	22 November 2001	6 December 2001
Fourth round	12 December 2001	21 February 2002	28 February 2002
Quarter-finals	12 December 2001	14 March 2002	21 March 2002
Semi-finals	22 March 2002	4 April 2002	11 April 2002
Final	22 March 2002	8 May 2002 at Feijenoord Stadion, Rotterdam	

== Format ==
Apart from the final, each tie was played over two legs, with each team playing one leg at home. The team that scored more goals on aggregate over the two legs advanced to the next round. If the aggregate score was level, the away goals rule was applied, i.e., the team that scored more goals away from home over the two legs advanced. If away goals were also equal, then thirty minutes of extra time (two fifteen-minute periods) was played. The away goals rule was again applied after extra time, i.e., if there were goals scored during extra time and the aggregate score was still level, the visiting team advanced by virtue of more away goals scored. If no goals were scored during extra time, the tie was decided by penalty shoot-out.

In the final, which was played as a single match, if scores were level at the end of normal time, extra time was played, followed by a penalty shoot-out if the score was still level. The mechanism of the draws for each round was as follows:

- In the draws for the third and fourth rounds, teams were seeded and divided into groups containing an equal number of seeded and unseeded teams. In each group, the seeded teams were drawn against the unseeded teams, with the first team drawn hosting the first leg. Teams from the same association could not be drawn against each other.
- In the draws for the quarter-finals onwards, there were no seedings and teams from the same association could be drawn against each other.

== Bracket ==
Third round
(England) Ipswich Town	1	1	2
(Italy) Internazionale	0	4	4
(Greece) AEK Athens	3	1	4
(Bulgaria) Litex Lovech	2	1	3
(Spain) Valencia (p)	1	0	1 (5)
(Scotland) Celtic	0	1	1 (4)
(Switzerland) Servette	0	3	3
(Germany) Hertha BSC	0	0	0
(Greece) PAOK	3	1	4
(Netherlands) PSV Eindhoven	2	4	6
(Switzerland) Grasshopper	1	2	3
(England) Leeds United	2	2	4
(Scotland) Rangers (p)	0	0	0 (4)
(France) Paris Saint-Germain	0	0	0 (3)
(Netherlands) Feyenoord	1	2	3
(Germany) SC Freiburg	0	2	2
(Belgium) Club Brugge	4	0	4
(France) Lyon (a)	1	3	4
(Czech Republic) Slovan Liberec	3	2	5
(Spain) Mallorca	1	1	2
(Italy) Fiorentina	0	0	0
(France) Lille	1	2	3
(Denmark) Copenhagen	0	0	0
(Germany) Borussia Dortmund	1	1	2
(Israel) Hapoel Tel Aviv	2	1	3
(Russia) Lokomotiv Moscow	1	0	1
(Italy) Parma	1	3	4
(Denmark) Brøndby	1	0	1
(France) Bordeaux	1	0	1
(Netherlands) Roda JC	0	2	2
(Italy) Milan	2	1	3
(Portugal) Sporting CP	0	1	1

Fourth round
(Italy) Internazionale	3	2	5
(Greece) AEK Athens	1	2	3
(Spain) Valencia	3	2	5
(Switzerland) Servette	0	2	2
(Netherlands) PSV Eindhoven	0	1	1
(England) Leeds United	0	0	0
(Scotland) Rangers	1	2	3
(Netherlands) Feyenoord	1	3	4
(France) Lyon	1	1	2
(Czech Republic) Slovan Liberec	1	4	5
(France) Lille	1	0	1
(Germany) Borussia Dortmund (a)	1	0	1
(Israel) Hapoel Tel Aviv	0	2	2
(Italy) Parma	0	1	1
(Netherlands) Roda JC	0	1	1 (2)
(Italy) Milan (p)	1	0	1 (3)

Quarter-finals
(Italy) Internazionale	1	1	2
(Spain) Valencia	1	0	1
(Netherlands) PSV Eindhoven	1	1	2 (4)
(Netherlands) Feyenoord (p)	1	1	2 (5)
(Czech Republic) Slovan Liberec	0	0	0
(Germany) Borussia Dortmund	0	4	4
(Israel) Hapoel Tel Aviv	1	0	1
(Italy) Milan	0	2	2

Semi-finals
(Italy) Internazionale	0	2	2
(Netherlands) Feyenoord	1	2	3
(Germany) Borussia Dortmund	4	1	5
(Italy) Milan	0	3	3

Final
8 May – Rotterdam
(Netherlands) Feyenoord	3
(Germany) Borussia Dortmund	2

== Third round ==
The draw for the third round was held on 2 November 2001, 13:00 CET.

=== Summary ===
The first legs were played on 20 and 22 November, and the second legs were played on 4 and 6 December 2001.

Team 1	Agg.	Team 2	1st leg	2nd leg
PAOK (Greece)	4–6	(Netherlands) PSV Eindhoven	3–2	1–4
Fiorentina (Italy)	0–3	(France) Lille	0–1	0–2
Valencia (Spain)	1–1 (5–4 p)	(Scotland) Celtic	1–0	0–1 (a.e.t.)
Servette (Switzerland)	3–0	(Germany) Hertha BSC	0–0	3–0
Ipswich Town (England)	2–4	(Italy) Internazionale	1–0	1–4
Rangers (Scotland)	0–0 (4–3 p) (Note: Order of legs reversed after original draw.)	(France) Paris Saint-Germain	0–0	0–0 (a.e.t.)
Feyenoord (Netherlands)	3–2	(Germany) SC Freiburg	1–0	2–2
AEK Athens (Greece)	4–3	(Bulgaria) Litex Lovech	3–2	1–1
Grasshopper (Switzerland)	3–4	(England) Leeds United	1–2	2–2
Parma (Italy)	4–1	(Denmark) Brøndby	1–1	3–0
Bordeaux (France)	1–2	(Netherlands) Roda JC	1–0	0–2
Slovan Liberec (Czech Republic)	5–2	(Spain) Mallorca	3–1	2–1
Hapoel Tel Aviv (Israel)	3–1	(Russia) Lokomotiv Moscow	2–1	1–0
Copenhagen (Denmark)	0–2	(Germany) Borussia Dortmund	0–1	0–1
Milan (Italy)	3–1	(Portugal) Sporting CP	2–0	1–1
Club Brugge (Belgium)	4–4 (a)	(France) Lyon	4–1	0–3

=== Matches ===
22 November 2001
18:30

PAOK (Greece)	3–2	(Netherlands) PSV Eindhoven
Yiasoumi 36', 69'; Udeze 44'	Report	de Jong 19'; Bruggink 81'

Toumba Stadium, Thessaloniki
Attendance: 25,000
Referee: Stéphane Bré (France)
6 December 2001
19:30

PSV Eindhoven (Netherlands)	4–1	(Greece) PAOK
Vennegoor of Hesselink 2', 58'; Gakhokidze 33'; Van Bommel 90'	Report	Okkas 59'

Philips Stadion, Eindhoven
Attendance: 25,000
Referee: Graziano Cesari (Italy)

PSV Eindhoven won 6–4 on aggregate.

22 November 2001
20:45

Fiorentina (Italy)	0–1	(France) Lille
	Report	Bakari 24'

Stadio Artemio Franchi, Florence
Attendance: 7,699
Referee: Manuel Mejuto González (Spain)
6 December 2001
19:00

Lille (France)	2–0	(Italy) Fiorentina
Cheyrou 32'; Sterjovski 78'	Report

Stade Grimonprez Jooris, Lille
Attendance: 15,798
Referee: Herbert Fandel (Germany)

Lille won 3–0 on aggregate.

22 November 2001
21:30

Valencia (Spain)	1–0	(Scotland) Celtic
Vicente 74'	Report

Mestalla Stadium, Valencia
Attendance: 31,204
Referee: Domenico Messina (Italy)
6 December 2001
20:30

Celtic (Scotland)	1–0 (a.e.t.)	(Spain) Valencia
Larsson 45'	Report
Penalties
Lambert (penalty scored); Thompson (penalty scored); Larsson (penalty missed); Petrov (penalty missed); Sutton (penalty scored); Hartson (penalty scored); Valgaeren (penalty missed)	4–5	(penalty scored) Carew; (penalty missed) Vicente; (penalty scored) de los Santos; (penalty scored) Sánchez; (penalty missed) Ayala; (penalty scored) Pellegrino; (penalty scored) Mista

Celtic Park, Glasgow
Attendance: 57,299
Referee: Knud Erik Fisker (Denmark)

1–1 on aggregate; Valencia won 5–4 on penalties.

22 November 2001
18:00

Servette (Switzerland)	0–0	(Germany) Hertha BSC
	Report

Charmilles Stadium, Geneva
Attendance: 8,412
Referee: Claus Bo Larsen (Denmark)
6 December 2001
18:00

Hertha BSC (Germany)	0–3	(Switzerland) Servette
	Report	Hilton 16'; Frei 48'; Obradović 69'

Friedrich-Ludwig-Jahn-Sportpark, Berlin
Attendance: 10,900
Referee: Graham Barber (England)

Servette won 3–0 on aggregate.

22 November 2001
20:45

Ipswich Town (England)	1–0	(Italy) Internazionale
Armstrong 81'	Report

Portman Road, Ipswich
Attendance: 24,569
Referee: Kim Milton Nielsen (Denmark)
6 December 2001
21:00

Internazionale (Italy)	4–1	(England) Ipswich Town
Vieri 19', 34', 71'; Kallon 46'	Report	Armstrong 79' (pen.)

San Siro, Milan
Attendance: 25,358
Referee: Graham Barber (England)

Internazionale won 4–2 on aggregate.

22 November 2001
21:00

Rangers (Scotland)	0–0	(France) Paris Saint-Germain
	Report

Ibrox Stadium, Glasgow
Attendance: 49,223
Referee: Karl-Erik Nilsson (Sweden)
6 December 2001
21:00

Paris Saint-Germain (France)	0–0 (a.e.t.)	(Scotland) Rangers
	Report
Penalties
Okocha (penalty missed); Ronaldinho (penalty scored); Arteta (penalty scored); Heinze (penalty missed); Mendy (penalty scored); Pochettino (penalty missed)	3–4	(penalty scored) Amoruso; (penalty scored) Latapy; (penalty missed) Konterman; (penalty missed) Caniggia; (penalty scored) Numan; (penalty scored) Ferguson

Parc des Princes, Paris
Attendance: 31,000
Referee: Hartmut Strampe (Germany)

0–0 on aggregate; Rangers won 4–3 on penalties.

22 November 2001
20:30

Feyenoord (Netherlands)	1–0	(Germany) SC Freiburg
Ono 81'	Report

De Kuip, Rotterdam
Attendance: 30,000
Referee: Stuart Dougal (Scotland)
6 December 2001
20:30

SC Freiburg (Germany)	2–2	(Netherlands) Feyenoord
Kehl 21'; Kobiashvili 49' (pen.)	Report	Van Hooijdonk 57'; Leonardo 86'

Dreisamstadion, Freiburg im Breisgau
Attendance: 18,700
Referee: Alfredo Trentalange (Italy)

Feyenoord won 3–2 on aggregate.

22 November 2001
20:15

AEK Athens (Greece)	3–2	(Bulgaria) Litex Lovech
Tsiartas 10' (pen.); Zagorakis 18'; Konstantinidis 23'	Report	Janković 30'; Răchită 71'

Nikos Goumas Stadium, Nea Filadelfeia
Attendance: 12,428
Referee: Wolfgang Stark (Germany)
6 December 2001
18:00

Litex Lovech (Bulgaria)	1–1	(Greece) AEK Athens
Yurukov 90'	Report	Gamarra 16'

Lovech Stadium, Lovech
Attendance: 3,600
Referee: René Temmink (Netherlands)

AEK Athens won 4–3 on aggregate.

22 November 2001
20:15

Grasshopper (Switzerland)	1–2	(England) Leeds United
Chapuisat 17'	Report	Harte 73'; Smith 78'

Hardturm, Zürich
Attendance: 15,000
Referee: Lucílio Batista (Portugal)
6 December 2001
21:00

Leeds United (England)	2–2	(Switzerland) Grasshopper
Kewell 19'; Keane 45'	Report	Núñez 42', 89'

Elland Road, Leeds
Attendance: 40,014
Referee: Frank De Bleeckere (Belgium)

Leeds United won 4–3 on aggregate.

22 November 2001
18:30

Parma (Italy)	1–1	(Denmark) Brøndby
Lamouchi 1'	Report	Nordin 90' (pen.)

Stadio Ennio Tardini, Parma
Attendance: 2,885
Referee: Konrad Plautz (Austria)
6 December 2001
17:30

Brøndby (Denmark)	0–3	(Italy) Parma
	Report	Mboma 44'; Nakata 58'; Lamouchi 82'

Brøndby Stadium, Brøndbyvester
Attendance: 20,628
Referee: Ľuboš Micheľ (Slovakia)

Parma won 4–1 on aggregate.

20 November 2001
18:00

Bordeaux (France)	1–0	(Netherlands) Roda JC
Paulo Miranda 49'	Report

Stade Chaban-Delmas, Bordeaux
Attendance: 7,678
Referee: Valentin Ivanov (Russia)
4 December 2001
18:00

Roda JC (Netherlands)	2–0	(France) Bordeaux
Anastasiou 56'; Lawal 64'	Report

Parkstad Limburg Stadion, Kerkrade
Attendance: 14,600
Referee: Fritz Stuchlik (Austria)

Roda JC won 2–1 on aggregate.

22 November 2001
19:00

Slovan Liberec (Czech Republic)	3–1	(Spain) Mallorca
Lukáš 2'; Johana 19'; Jun 50'	Report	Biagini 60'

Stadion u Nisy, Liberec
Attendance: 6,682
Referee: Jacek Granat (Poland)
6 December 2001
20:45

Mallorca (Spain)	1–2	(Czech Republic) Slovan Liberec
Eto'o 80' (pen.)	Report	Gyan 56'; Štajner 69'

Son Moix Stadium, Palma
Attendance: 17,596
Referee: Éric Poulat (France)

Slovan Liberec won 5–2 on aggregate.

20 November 2001
18:00

Hapoel Tel Aviv (Israel)	2–1	(Russia) Lokomotiv Moscow
Osterc 42'; Domb 89'	Report	Izmailov 56'

Bloomfield Stadium, Tel Aviv
Attendance: 10,500
Referee: Leslie Irvine (Northern Ireland)
4 December 2001
18:00

Lokomotiv Moscow (Russia)	0–1	(Israel) Hapoel Tel Aviv
	Report	Osterc 48'

Saturn Stadium, Ramenskoye
Attendance: 8,000
Referee: Alain Hamer (Luxembourg)

Hapoel Tel Aviv won 3–1 on aggregate.

22 November 2001
18:30

Copenhagen (Denmark)	0–1	(Germany) Borussia Dortmund
	Report	Herrlich 90'

Parken Stadium, Copenhagen
Attendance: 18,620
Referee: Mike Riley (England)
4 December 2001
18:00

Borussia Dortmund (Germany)	1–0	(Denmark) Copenhagen
Sørensen 89'	Report

Westfalenstadion, Dortmund
Attendance: 42,500
Referee: Mike McCurry (Scotland)

Borussia Dortmund won 2–0 on aggregate.

22 November 2001
20:45

Milan (Italy)	2–0	(Portugal) Sporting CP
Shevchenko 37'; Inzaghi 77'	Report

San Siro, Milan
Attendance: 10,132
Referee: Juan Fernández Marin (Spain)
6 December 2001
21:00

Sporting CP (Portugal)	1–1	(Italy) Milan
Niculae 49'	Report	Moreno 90'

Estádio José Alvalade, Lisbon
Attendance: 37,523
Referee: Ryszard Wójcik (Poland)

Milan won 3–1 on aggregate.

22 November 2001
19:30

Club Brugge (Belgium)	4–1	(France) Lyon
Englebert 4'; Van Der Heyden 54'; Mendoza 75'; De Brul 90'	Report	Luyindula 83'

Jan Breydelstadion, Bruges
Attendance: 14,670
Referee: Arturo Daudén Ibáñez (Spain)
6 December 2001
19:30

Lyon (France)	3–0	(Belgium) Club Brugge
Anderson 19', 23', 90+3'	Report

Stade de Gerland, Lyon
Attendance: 31,086
Referee: Rune Pedersen (Norway)

4–4 on aggregate; Lyon won on away goals.

== Fourth round ==
The draw for the fourth round was held on 12 December 2001, 12:00 CET.

=== Summary ===
The first legs were played on 19 and 21 February, and the second legs were played on 28 February 2002.

Team 1	Agg.	Team 2	1st leg	2nd leg
Internazionale (Italy)	5–3	(Greece) AEK Athens	3–1	2–2
Valencia (Spain)	5–2	(Switzerland) Servette	3–0	2–2
PSV Eindhoven (Netherlands)	1–0	(England) Leeds United	0–0	1–0
Rangers (Scotland)	3–4	(Netherlands) Feyenoord	1–1	2–3
Lyon (France)	2–5	(Czech Republic) Slovan Liberec	1–1	1–4
Lille (France)	1–1 (a)	(Germany) Borussia Dortmund	1–1	0–0
Hapoel Tel Aviv (Israel)	2–1	(Italy) Parma	0–0	2–1
Roda JC (Netherlands)	1–1 (2–3 p) (Note: Order of legs reversed after original draw.)	(Italy) Milan	0–1	1–0 (a.e.t.)

=== Matches ===
21 February 2002
21:00

Internazionale (Italy)	3–1	(Greece) AEK Athens
J. Zanetti 14'; Kallon 37'; Ventola 56'	Report	Zagorakis 8'

San Siro, Milan
Attendance: 14,030
Referee: Graham Poll (England)
28 February 2002
20:30

AEK Athens (Greece)	2–2	(Italy) Internazionale
Konstantinidis 23'; Nikolaidis 56'	Report	Greško 20'; Ventola 57'

Nikos Goumas Stadium, Nea Filadelfeia
Attendance: 14,310
Referee: Karl-Erik Nilsson (Sweden)

Internazionale won 5–3 on aggregate.

19 February 2002
18:00

Valencia (Spain)	3–0	(Switzerland) Servette
Hilton 3' (o.g.); Aimar 48'; Ballesta 58'	Report

Mestalla Stadium, Valencia
Attendance: 23,000
Referee: Konrad Plautz (Austria)
28 February 2002
20:15

Servette (Switzerland)	2–2	(Spain) Valencia
Robert 37'; Frei 67'	Report	Sánchez 12'; Angulo 45'

Charmilles Stadium, Geneva
Attendance: 9,018
Referee: Valentin Ivanov (Russia)

Valencia won 5–2 on aggregate.

21 February 2002
19:00

PSV Eindhoven (Netherlands)	0–0	(England) Leeds United
	Report

Philips Stadion, Eindhoven
Attendance: 32,000
Referee: Stefano Braschi (Italy)
28 February 2002
21:00

Leeds United (England)	0–1	(Netherlands) PSV Eindhoven
	Report	Vennegoor of Hesselink 89'

Elland Road, Leeds
Attendance: 39,755
Referee: Antonio López Nieto (Spain)

PSV Eindhoven won 1–0 on aggregate.

21 February 2002
21:05

Rangers (Scotland)	1–1	(Netherlands) Feyenoord
Ferguson 81' (pen.)	Report	Ono 72'

Ibrox Stadium, Glasgow
Attendance: 49,041
Referee: Éric Poulat (France)
28 February 2002
19:00

Feyenoord (Netherlands)	3–2	(Scotland) Rangers
Van Hooijdonk 37', 44'; Kalou 47'	Report	McCann 26'; Ferguson 55' (pen.)

De Kuip, Rotterdam
Attendance: 47,000
Referee: Herbert Fandel (Germany)

Feyenoord won 4–3 on aggregate.

21 February 2002
19:15

Lyon (France)	1–1	(Czech Republic) Slovan Liberec
Govou 81'	Report	Štajner 14' (pen.)

Stade de Gerland, Lyon
Attendance: 26,069
Referee: Frank De Bleeckere (Belgium)
28 February 2002
17:00

Slovan Liberec (Czech Republic)	4–1	(France) Lyon
Nezmar 1', 82'; Štajner 75'; Neumann 85'	Report	Müller 17'

Stadion Letná, Prague (Note: Slovan Liberec played their home match in the fourth round and quarter-finals at Stadion Letná, Prague, instead of their regular stadium, Stadion u Nisy, Liberec, due to unplayable pitch conditions.)
Attendance: 9,506
Referee: Lucílio Batista (Portugal)

Slovan Liberec won 5–2 on aggregate.

21 February 2002
20:45

Lille (France)	1–1	(Germany) Borussia Dortmund
Bassir 72'	Report	Ewerthon 67'

Stade Grimonprez-Jooris, Lille
Attendance: 16,000
Referee: Arturo Daudén Ibáñez (Spain)
28 February 2002
20:30

Borussia Dortmund (Germany)	0–0	(France) Lille
	Report

Westfalenstadion, Dortmund
Attendance: 41,941
Referee: Domenico Messina (Italy)

1–1 on aggregate; Borussia Dortmund won on away goals.

21 February 2002
18:30

Hapoel Tel Aviv (Israel)	0–0	(Italy) Parma
	Report

Bloomfield Stadium, Tel Aviv
Attendance: 16,500
Referee: Rune Pedersen (Norway)
28 February 2002
18:00

Parma (Italy)	1–2	(Israel) Hapoel Tel Aviv
Bonazzoli 85'	Report	Osterc 31'; Pisont 54'

Stadio Ennio Tardini, Parma
Attendance: 5,799
Referee: Jacek Granat (Poland)

Hapoel Tel Aviv won 2–1 on aggregate.

19 February 2002
18:00

Roda JC (Netherlands)	0–1	(Italy) Milan
	Report	José Mari 28'

Parkstad Limburg Stadion, Kerkrade
Attendance: 19,500
Referee: Graham Barber (England)
28 February 2002
20:45

Milan (Italy)	0–1 (a.e.t.)	(Netherlands) Roda JC
	Report	Luijpers 69'
Penalties
Brocchi (penalty scored); José Mari (penalty missed); Kaladze (penalty missed); Pirlo (penalty scored); Contra (penalty scored)	3–2	(penalty scored) Anastasiou; (penalty scored) Lawal; (penalty missed) Soetaers; (penalty missed) Luijpers; (penalty missed) Van der Luer

San Siro, Milan
Attendance: 7,291
Referee: Wolfgang Stark (Germany)

1–1 on aggregate; Milan won 3–2 on penalties.

== Quarter-finals ==
The draw for the quarter-finals was held on 12 December 2001, 12:00 CET, immediately after the fourth round draw.

=== Summary ===
The first legs were played on 14 March, and the second legs were played on 21 March 2002.

Team 1	Agg.	Team 2	1st leg	2nd leg
Internazionale (Italy)	2–1	(Spain) Valencia	1–1	1–0
PSV Eindhoven (Netherlands)	2–2 (4–5 p)	(Netherlands) Feyenoord	1–1	1–1 (a.e.t.)
Slovan Liberec (Czech Republic)	0–4 (Note: Order of legs reversed after original draw.)	(Germany) Borussia Dortmund	0–0	0–4
Hapoel Tel Aviv (Israel)	1–2	(Italy) Milan	1–0	0–2

=== Matches ===
14 March 2002
21:00

Internazionale (Italy)	1–1	(Spain) Valencia
Materazzi 50'	Report	Rufete 66'

San Siro, Milan
Attendance: 24,184
Referee: Markus Merk (Germany)
21 March 2002
21:45

Valencia (Spain)	0–1	(Italy) Internazionale
	Report	Ventola 4'

Estadio Mestalla, Valencia
Attendance: 47,000
Referee: Claude Colombo (France)

Internazionale won 2–1 on aggregate.

14 March 2002
20:15

PSV Eindhoven (Netherlands)	1–1	(Netherlands) Feyenoord
Kežman 47'	Report	Van Hooijdonk 45+2'

Philips Stadion, Eindhoven
Attendance: 29,000
Referee: Pierluigi Collina (Italy)
21 March 2002
20:15

Feyenoord (Netherlands)	1–1 (a.e.t.)	(Netherlands) PSV Eindhoven
Van Hooijdonk 90+3'	Report	Van Bommel 75'
Penalties
Ono (penalty scored); Paauwe (penalty scored); Van Wonderen (penalty scored); Bosvelt (penalty scored); Van Hooijdonk (penalty scored)	5–4	(penalty scored) Bruggink; (penalty scored) Ooijer; (penalty missed) Gakhokidze; (penalty scored) Heintze; (penalty scored) Kežman

De Kuip, Rotterdam
Attendance: 43,000
Referee: Graham Barber (England)

2–2 on aggregate; Feyenoord won 5–4 on penalties.

14 March 2002
20:25

Slovan Liberec (Czech Republic)	0–0	(Germany) Borussia Dortmund
	Report

Stadion Letná, Prague
Attendance: 14,458
Referee: Vítor Melo Pereira (Portugal)
21 March 2002
20:30

Borussia Dortmund (Germany)	4–0	(Czech Republic) Slovan Liberec
Amoroso 51'; Koller 57'; Ricken 70'; Ewerthon 89'	Report

Westfalenstadion, Dortmund
Attendance: 36,500
Referee: Stefano Braschi (Italy)

Borussia Dortmund won 4–0 on aggregate.

14 March 2002
20:00

Hapoel Tel Aviv (Israel)	1–0	(Italy) Milan
Cleșcenco 32'	Report

GSP Stadium, Nicosia, Cyprus (Note: Due to security issues caused by the Second Intifada, Israeli teams were required to play their home matches at neutral venues until further notice. As a result, Hapoel Tel Aviv played their home match in the quarter-finals at GSP Stadium, Nicosia, Cyprus, instead of their regular stadium, Bloomfield Stadium, Tel Aviv.)
Attendance: 4,509
Referee: Antonio Jesús López Nieto (Spain)
21 March 2002
20:30

Milan (Italy)	2–0	(Israel) Hapoel Tel Aviv
Rui Costa 5'; Gershon 45' (o.g.)	Report

San Siro, Milan
Attendance: 23,184
Referee: Herbert Fandel (Germany)

Milan won 2–1 on aggregate.

== Semi-finals ==
The draw for the semi-finals was held on 22 March 2002, 13:00 CET.

=== Summary ===
The first legs were played on 4 April, and the second legs were played on 11 April 2002.

Team 1	Agg.	Team 2	1st leg	2nd leg
Internazionale (Italy)	2–3	(Netherlands) Feyenoord	0–1	2–2
Borussia Dortmund (Germany)	5–3 (Note: Order of legs reversed after original draw.)	(Italy) Milan	4–0	1–3

=== Matches ===
4 April 2002
21:00

Internazionale (Italy)	0–1	(Netherlands) Feyenoord
	Report	Córdoba 51' (o.g.)

San Siro, Milan
Attendance: 39,622
Referee: Ľuboš Micheľ (Slovakia)
11 April 2002
20:30

Feyenoord (Netherlands)	2–2	(Italy) Internazionale
Van Hooijdonk 17'; Tomasson 34'	Report	C. Zanetti 83'; Kallon 89' (pen.)

De Kuip, Rotterdam
Attendance: 49,904
Referee: Antonio Jesús López Nieto (Spain)

Feyenoord won 3–2 on aggregate.

4 April 2002
20:30

Borussia Dortmund (Germany)	4–0	(Italy) Milan
Amoroso 7' (pen.), 33', 39'; Heinrich 63'	Report

Westfalenstadion, Dortmund
Attendance: 51,000
Referee: Graham Poll (England)
11 April 2002
20:45

Milan (Italy)	3–1	(Germany) Borussia Dortmund
Inzaghi 10'; Contra 18'; Serginho 90+2' (pen.)	Report	Ricken 90+4'

San Siro, Milan
Attendance: 15,301
Referee: Gilles Veissière (France)

Borussia Dortmund won 5–3 on aggregate.

== Final ==
The final was played on 8 May 2002 at Feijenoord Stadion in Rotterdam, Netherlands.

8 May 2002
20:45 UTC+2

Feyenoord (Netherlands)	3–2	(Germany) Borussia Dortmund
Van Hooijdonk 33' (pen.), 40'; Tomasson 50'	Report	Amoroso 47' (pen.); Koller 58'

Feijenoord Stadion, Rotterdam
Attendance: 45,611
Referee: Vítor Melo Pereira (Portugal)
