= 2001–02 UEFA Cup second round =

International football competition

The 2001–02 UEFA Cup second round was played from 16 October to 1 November 2001. The round consisted of 24 ties, with the winners advancing to the third round of the 2001–02 UEFA Cup.

Times are CET or CEST, (Note: CEST (UTC+2) for dates up to 27 October 2001 (first legs), and CET (UTC+1) for dates thereafter (second legs).) as listed by UEFA.

== Draw ==
The draw was held on 28 September 2001, 12:00 CEST, at the UEFA headquarters in Nyon, Switzerland. Teams were divided into geographical groups, each with seeded and unseeded pots.

== Summary ==
The second round featured the 48 winners of the first round. The first legs were played on 16 and 18 October, and the second legs were played on 30 October and 1 November 2001.

Team 1	Agg.	Team 2	1st leg	2nd leg
Roda JC (Netherlands)	5–3	(Israel) Maccabi Tel Aviv	4–1	1–2
Legia Warsaw (Poland)	2–7	(Spain) Valencia	1–1	1–6
SC Freiburg (Germany)	4–2	(Switzerland) St. Gallen	0–1	4–1
Bordeaux (France)	4–0	(Belgium) Standard Liège	2–0	2–0
Fiorentina (Italy)	4–2	(Austria) Tirol Innsbruck	2–0	2–2
Ipswich Town (England)	3–1	(Sweden) Helsingborgs IF	0–0	3–1
Paris Saint-Germain (France)	6–2	(Austria) Rapid Wien	4–0	2–2
Union Berlin (Germany)	0–2	(Bulgaria) Litex Lovech	0–2	0–0
Copenhagen (Denmark)	1–0	(Netherlands) Ajax	0–0	1–0
Internazionale (Italy)	2–1	(Poland) Wisła Kraków	2–0	0–1
PAOK (Greece)	8–3	(Czech Republic) Marila Příbram	6–1	2–2
Rangers (Scotland)	7–2	(Russia) Dynamo Moscow	3–1	4–1
Halmstads BK (Sweden)	1–7	(Portugal) Sporting CP	0–1	1–6
Zaragoza (Spain)	0–1	(Switzerland) Servette	0–0	0–1
Leeds United (England)	6–5	(France) Troyes	4–2	2–3
CSKA Kyiv (Ukraine)	0–7	(Belgium) Club Brugge	0–2	0–5
Utrecht (Netherlands)	1–3	(Italy) Parma	1–3	0–0
Osijek (Croatia)	3–5	(Greece) AEK Athens	1–2	2–3
Viking (Norway)	0–3	(Germany) Hertha BSC	0–1	0–2
Grasshopper (Switzerland)	6–5	(Netherlands) Twente	4–1	2–4
Varteks (Croatia)	3–6	(Denmark) Brøndby	3–1	0–5
Hapoel Tel Aviv (Israel)	3–1	(England) Chelsea	2–0	1–1
Celta Vigo (Spain)	3–4	(Czech Republic) Slovan Liberec	3–1	0–3
Milan (Italy)	3–0	(Bulgaria) CSKA Sofia	2–0	1–0

== Matches ==
16 October 2001
18:00

Roda JC (Netherlands)	4–1	(Israel) Maccabi Tel Aviv
Soetaers 4', 35'; Berglund 54'; Sonkaya 82'	Report	Horváth 78'

Parkstad Limburg Stadion, Kerkrade
Attendance: 5,000
Referee: Yuri Baskakov (Russia)
1 November 2001
18:00

Maccabi Tel Aviv (Israel)	2–1	(Netherlands) Roda JC
Biton 37', 57'	Report	Lawal 11'

Bloomfield Stadium, Tel Aviv
Attendance: 5,198
Referee: Tomasz Mikulski (Poland)

Roda JC won 5–3 on aggregate.

18 October 2001
19:00

Legia Warsaw (Poland)	1–1	(Spain) Valencia
Karwan 11'	Report	A. Ilie 60' (pen.)

Stadion Wojska Polskiego, Warsaw
Attendance: 11,029
Referee: Bernhard Brugger (Austria)
1 November 2001
21:30

Valencia (Spain)	6–1	(Poland) Legia Warsaw
Albelda 13'; A. Ilie 16'; Đukić 32'; Aimar 39' (pen.); Sánchez 70'; Angulo 78'	Report	Svitlica 76'

Estadi de Mestalla, Valencia
Attendance: 36,560
Referee: Tom Henning Øvrebø (Norway)

Valencia won 7–2 on aggregate.

18 October 2001
20:30

SC Freiburg (Germany)	0–1	(Switzerland) St. Gallen
	Report	Mokoena 90'

Dreisamstadion, Freiburg im Breisgau
Attendance: 18,000
Referee: Vladimír Hriňák (Slovakia)
1 November 2001
16:00

St. Gallen (Switzerland)	1–4	(Germany) SC Freiburg
Zellweger 8'	Report	Tskitishvili 11'; Sellimi 37'; But 73'; Kehl 82'

Hardturm, Zürich
Attendance: 16,066
Referee: Michal Beneš (Czech Republic)

SC Freiburg won 4–2 on aggregate.

18 October 2001
19:00

Bordeaux (France)	2–0	(Belgium) Standard Liège
Pauleta 6' (pen.); Christian 33'	Report

Stade Chaban-Delmas, Bordeaux
Attendance: 13,154
Referee: Massimo Busacca (Switzerland)
1 November 2001
20:00

Standard Liège (Belgium)	0–2	(France) Bordeaux
	Report	Dugarry 57'; Pauleta 84'

Stade Maurice Dufrasne, Liège
Attendance: 12,900
Referee: Erol Ersoy (Turkey)

Bordeaux won 4–0 on aggregate.

18 October 2001
20:45

Fiorentina (Italy)	2–0	(Austria) Tirol Innsbruck
Morfeo 47'; Nuno Gomes 86'	Report

Stadio Artemio Franchi, Florence
Attendance: 10,418
Referee: Martin Ingvarsson (Sweden)
1 November 2001
20:30

Tirol Innsbruck (Austria)	2–2	(Italy) Fiorentina
Gilewicz 25', 75'	Report	Nuno Gomes 26'; Morfeo 41'

Tivoli Neu, Innsbruck
Attendance: 14,200
Referee: Georgios Douros (Greece)

Fiorentina won 4–2 on aggregate.

18 October 2001
21:05

Ipswich Town (England)	0–0	(Sweden) Helsingborgs IF
	Report

Portman Road, Ipswich
Attendance: 22,254
Referee: Wolfgang Sowa (Austria)
1 November 2001
20:45

Helsingborgs IF (Sweden)	1–3	(England) Ipswich Town
Eklund 7'	Report	Hreiðarsson 69'; Stewart 81', 88'

Olympia, Helsingborg
Attendance: 9,484
Referee: Eduardo Iturralde González (Spain)

Ipswich Town won 3–1 on aggregate.

18 October 2001
21:00

Paris Saint-Germain (France)	4–0	(Austria) Rapid Wien
Ronaldinho 16', 58'; Mendy 28'; Anelka 54'	Report

Parc des Princes, Paris
Attendance: 27,155
Referee: Fiorenzo Treossi (Italy)
1 November 2001
18:00

Rapid Wien (Austria)	2–2	(France) Paris Saint-Germain
Wagner 10', 16'	Report	Potillon 52'; Hugo Leal 90+1'

Gerhard-Hanappi-Stadion, Vienna
Attendance: 10,400
Referee: Roy Helge Olsen (Norway)

Paris Saint-Germain won 6–2 on aggregate.

18 October 2001
18:00

Union Berlin (Germany)	0–2	(Bulgaria) Litex Lovech
	Report	Bornosuzov 50'; Petrov 90'

Friedrich-Ludwig-Jahn-Sportpark, Berlin
Attendance: 11,255
Referee: Leif Sundell (Sweden)
30 October 2001
17:30

Litex Lovech (Bulgaria)	0–0	(Germany) Union Berlin
	Report

Lovech Stadium, Lovech
Attendance: 3,250
Referee: Kristinn Jakobsson (Iceland)

Litex Lovech won 2–0 on aggregate.

18 October 2001
18:30

Copenhagen (Denmark)	0–0	(Netherlands) Ajax
	Report

Parken, Copenhagen
Attendance: 20,067
Referee: Darko Čeferin (Slovenia)
1 November 2001
20:45

Ajax (Netherlands)	0–1	(Denmark) Copenhagen
	Report	Jensen 82'

Amsterdam ArenA, Amsterdam
Attendance: 35,300
Referee: Jacek Granat (Poland)

Copenhagen won 1–0 on aggregate.

18 October 2001
21:00

Internazionale (Italy)	2–0	(Poland) Wisła Kraków
Kallon 61', 65'	Report

Stadio Nereo Rocco, Trieste
Attendance: 4,934
Referee: Leslie Irvine (Northern Ireland)
30 October 2001
13:00

Wisła Kraków (Poland)	1–0	(Italy) Internazionale
Żurawski 4'	Report

Wisła Stadium, Kraków
Attendance: 4,415
Referee: Paulo Paraty (Portugal)

Internazionale won 2–1 on aggregate.

18 October 2001
20:00

PAOK (Greece)	6–1	(Czech Republic) Marila Příbram
Yiasoumi 22', 27'; Okkas 37', 87'; Konstantinidis 50'; Luciano 75'	Report	Siegl 56'

Stadio Toumba, Thessaloniki
Attendance: 5,677
Referee: Victor Esquinas Torres (Spain)
1 November 2001
14:00

Marila Příbram (Czech Republic)	2–2	(Greece) PAOK
Čížek 36'; Kučera 61'	Report	Luciano 15'; Yiasoumi 61'

Na Litavce, Příbram
Attendance: 2,225
Referee: Nicolai Vollquartz (Denmark)

PAOK won 8–3 on aggregate.

18 October 2001
20:45

Rangers (Scotland)	3–1	(Russia) Dynamo Moscow
Amoruso 9'; Ball 61'; de Boer 79'	Report	Gusev 89'

Ibrox Stadium, Glasgow
Attendance: 45,008
Referee: Stéphane Bré (France)
1 November 2001
18:00

Dynamo Moscow (Russia)	1–4	(Scotland) Rangers
Gusev 27'	Report	de Boer 8'; Ferguson 16'; Flo 42'; Løvenkrands 78'

Dinamo Stadium, Moscow
Attendance: 6,000
Referee: Pasquale Rodomonti (Italy)

Rangers won 7–2 on aggregate.

18 October 2001
20:00

Halmstads BK (Sweden)	0–1	(Portugal) Sporting CP
	Report	Niculae 53'

Örjans vall, Halmstad
Attendance: 3,141
Referee: Pascal Garibian (France)
1 November 2001
21:00

Sporting CP (Portugal)	6–1	(Sweden) Halmstads BK
Jardel 30' (pen.), 76', 90'; João Pinto 39'; Niculae 61'; Paulo Bento 71'	Report	Nordstrand 41'

José Alvalade, Lisbon
Attendance: 17,800
Referee: Philippe Leuba (Switzerland)

Sporting CP won 7–2 on aggregate.

18 October 2001
21:00

Zaragoza (Spain)	0–0	(Switzerland) Servette
	Report

La Romareda, Zaragoza
Attendance: 16,500
Referee: Lutz Michael Fröhlich (Germany)
1 November 2001
20:30

Servette (Switzerland)	1–0	(Spain) Zaragoza
Oruma 87'	Report

Charmilles Stadium, Geneva
Attendance: 8,274
Referee: Orhan Erdemir (Turkey)

Servette won 1–0 on aggregate.

18 October 2001
21:00

Leeds United (England)	4–2	(France) Troyes
Viduka 5', 43'; Bowyer 22', 46'	Report	Loko 30', 80'

Elland Road, Leeds
Attendance: 40,015
Referee: Fernando Carmona Méndez (Spain)
1 November 2001
20:15

Troyes (France)	3–2	(England) Leeds United
Amzine 8'; Hamed 38'; Rothen 58'	Report	Viduka 15'; Keane 78'

Stade de l'Aube, Troyes
Attendance: 15,500
Referee: Massimo De Santis (Italy)

Leeds United won 6–5 on aggregate.

18 October 2001
18:00

CSKA Kyiv (Ukraine)	0–2	(Belgium) Club Brugge
	Report	Verheyen 33', 47'

Dynamo Stadium, Kyiv (Note: CSKA Kyiv played their home matches at Dynamo Stadium, Kyiv, instead of their regular stadium, CSK ZSU Stadium, Kyiv, as it did not meet UEFA requirements.)
Attendance: 3,500
Referee: Mikko Vuorela (Finland)
1 November 2001
20:30

Club Brugge (Belgium)	5–0	(Ukraine) CSKA Kyiv
Martens 4', 73', 90'; Verheyen 7'; Mendoza 42'	Report

Jan Breydelstadion, Bruges
Attendance: 7,788
Referee: Paulo Costa (Portugal)

Club Brugge won 7–0 on aggregate.

18 October 2001
20:45

Utrecht (Netherlands)	1–3	(Italy) Parma
Jochemsen 76'	Report	Di Vaio 22', 69'; Bonazzoli 55'

Stadion Galgenwaard, Utrecht
Attendance: 14,000
Referee: Sorin Carpodean (Romania)
1 November 2001
20:45

Parma (Italy)	0–0	(Netherlands) Utrecht
	Report

Stadio Ennio Tardini, Parma
Attendance: 8,500
Referee: Helmut Fleischer (Germany)

Parma won 3–1 on aggregate.

18 October 2001
18:00

Osijek (Croatia)	1–2	(Greece) AEK Athens
Mijatović 71'	Report	Zagorakis 6'; Nikolaidis 70'

Gradski Vrt Stadium, Osijek
Attendance: 2,500
Referee: Eric Romain (Belgium)
30 October 2001
18:00

AEK Athens (Greece)	3–2	(Croatia) Osijek
Lakis 31'; Tsiartas 38'; Konstantinidis 79'	Report	Rodrigo 15' (o.g.); Mitu 43'

Nikos Goumas Stadium, Nea Filadelfeia
Attendance: 3,446
Referee: Ivan Dobrinov (Bulgaria)

AEK Athens won 5–3 on aggregate.

16 October 2001
17:00

Viking (Norway)	0–1	(Germany) Hertha BSC
	Report	Preetz 5'

Stavanger Stadion, Stavanger
Attendance: 3,750
Referee: Miroslav Liba (Czech Republic)
1 November 2001
18:00

Hertha BSC (Germany)	2–0	(Norway) Viking
Alex Alves 17'; Sverrisson 29'	Report

Friedrich-Ludwig-Jahn-Sportpark, Berlin
Attendance: 19,000
Referee: Paul Allaerts (Belgium)

Hertha BSC won 3–0 on aggregate.

18 October 2001
19:15

Grasshopper (Switzerland)	4–1	(Netherlands) Twente
Núñez 29', 34', 90'; Petrić 57'	Report	Polak 69'

Hardturm, Zürich
Attendance: 5,500
Referee: Georgios Kasnaferis (Greece)
1 November 2001
18:30

Twente (Netherlands)	4–2	(Switzerland) Grasshopper
van der Laan 35', 79'; Cairo 45'; El Brazi 60'	Report	Chapuisat 70'; Benjani 85'

De Grolsch Veste, Enschede
Attendance: 6,500
Referee: Attila Hanacsek (Hungary)

Grasshopper won 6–5 on aggregate.

18 October 2001
20:45

Varteks (Croatia)	3–1	(Denmark) Brøndby
Bjelanović 64'; Mumlek 77'; Karić 83' (pen.)	Report	Niżnik 80'

Stadion Varteks, Varaždin
Attendance: 8,000
Referee: Dani Koren (Israel)
1 November 2001
19:00

Brøndby (Denmark)	5–0	(Croatia) Varteks
Madsen 1'; Bagger 31'; Jonson 53', 76', 83'	Report

Brøndby Stadium, Brøndbyvester
Attendance: 8,150
Referee: Costas Kapitanis (Cyprus)

Brøndby won 6–3 on aggregate.

18 October 2001
20:15

Hapoel Tel Aviv (Israel)	2–0	(England) Chelsea
Gershon 87' (pen.); Cleşcenco 90+4'	Report

Bloomfield Stadium, Tel Aviv
Attendance: 11,386
Referee: Dick van Egmond (Netherlands)
1 November 2001
21:00

Chelsea (England)	1–1	(Israel) Hapoel Tel Aviv
Zola 64'	Report	Osterc 35'

Stamford Bridge, London
Attendance: 28,433
Referee: Laurent Duhamel (France)

Hapoel Tel Aviv won 3–1 on aggregate.

18 October 2001
21:35

Celta Vigo (Spain)	3–1	(Czech Republic) Slovan Liberec
Mostovoi 35', 76', 90'	Report	Cáceres 65' (o.g.)

Balaídos, Vigo
Attendance: 4,357
Referee: Edo Trivković (Croatia)
1 November 2001
18:30

Slovan Liberec (Czech Republic)	3–0	(Spain) Celta Vigo
Štajner 38'; Nezmar 70', 90'	Report

Stadion u Nisy, Liberec
Attendance: 6,052
Referee: Franz-Xaver Wack (Germany)

Slovan Liberec won 4–3 on aggregate.

18 October 2001
20:45

Milan (Italy)	2–0	(Bulgaria) CSKA Sofia
Rui Costa 20'; Shevchenko 51'	Report

San Siro, Milan
Attendance: 6,759
Referee: Claus Bo Larsen (Denmark)
1 November 2001
17:45

CSKA Sofia (Bulgaria)	0–1	(Italy) Milan
	Report	Inzaghi 62'

Balgarska Armiya Stadium, Sofia
Attendance: 13,820
Referee: Dermot Gallagher (England)

Milan won 3–0 on aggregate.
