= 2001–02 UEFA Cup =

31st season of Europe's secondary club football tournament organised by UEFA

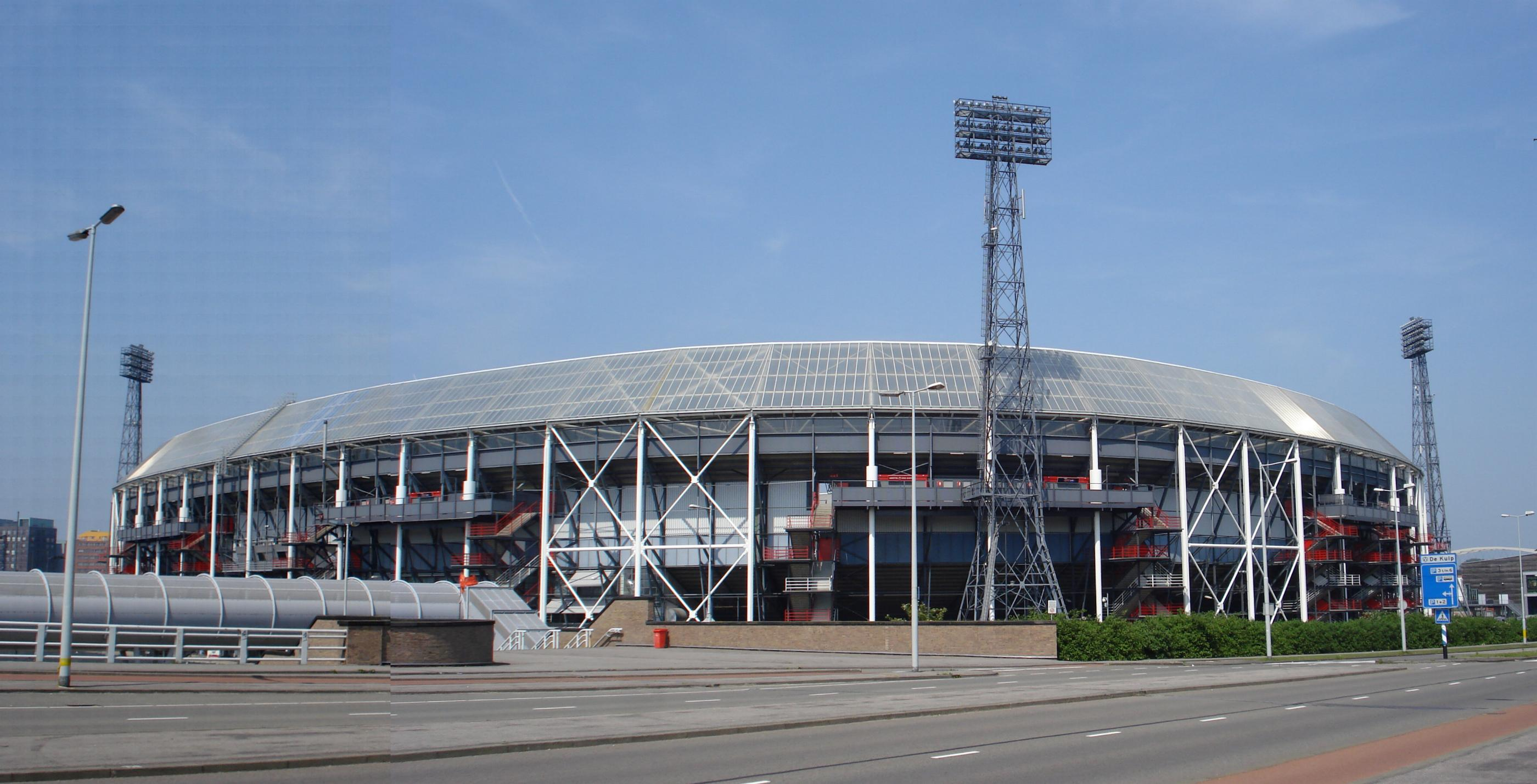
- De Kuip, in Rotterdam, hosted the final.
- Dates: 9 August 2001 – 8 May 2002

Final positions
- Champions: (Netherlands) Feyenoord (2nd title)
- Runners-up: (Germany) Borussia Dortmund

Tournament statistics
- Matches played: 204
- Goals scored: 552 (2.71 per match)
- Attendance: 2,889,630 (14,165 per match)
- Top scorer(s): Pierre van Hooijdonk (Feyenoord); 8 goals

The 2001–02 UEFA Cup was won by Feyenoord at their home ground in the final against Borussia Dortmund. It was the second time they won the competition.

Liverpool could not defend their title as they automatically qualified for the 2001–02 UEFA Champions League and also reached the knockout stage.

== Association team allocation ==
A total of 145 teams from 51 UEFA associations participated in the 2001–02 UEFA Cup. Associations are allocated places according to their 2000 UEFA league coefficient.

Below is the qualification scheme for the 2001–02 UEFA Cup:

- Associations 1–6 each enter three teams
- Associations 7–8 each enter four teams
- Associations 9–15 each enter two teams
- Associations 16–21 each enter three teams
- Associations 22–49 each enter two teams, with the exception of Liechtenstein who enter one.
- Associations 50-51 each enter one team
- The top three associations of the 2000–2001 UEFA Fair Play ranking each gain an additional berth
- 16 teams eliminated from the 2001–02 UEFA Champions League qualifying rounds
- 8 teams eliminated from the 2001–02 UEFA Champions League group stage are transferred to the UEFA Cup
- 3 winners of the Intertoto Cup
- The winner of the 2000–01 UEFA Cup (not used due to Liverpool's qualification to Champions League)

=== Association ranking ===
Rank	Association	Coeff.	Teams	Notes
1	Spain	59.599	3	+1(UCL)
2	Italy	55.927	3	+1(UCL)
3	Germany	44.403	3	+1(UCL)
4	France	42.727	3	+2(UCL) +2(IT)
5	England	41.455	3	+1(IT)
6	Netherlands	36.666	3	+3(UCL)
7	Russia	29.275	4	+1(UCL)
8	Czech Republic	29.124	4	+1(UCL)
9	Greece	28.866	2	
10	Portugal	24.549	2	
11	Turkey	23.850	2	
12	Ukraine	23.166	2	+1(UCL)
13	Norway	22.100	2	
14	Switzerland	21.000	2	+1(UCL)
15	Scotland	20.500	2	+2(UCL)
16	Austria	20.500	3	+1(UCL)
17	Belgium	19.050	3	
18	Denmark	18.175	3	+1(UCL)

Rank	Association	Coeff.	Teams	Notes
19	Poland	18.000	3	+1(UCL)
20	Romania	17.833	3	+1(UCL)
21	Croatia	16.124	3	+1(UCL)
22	Sweden	15.533	2	+1(UCL)
23	Hungary	15.416	2	
24	Israel	13.541	2	
25	Slovakia	12.832	2	+1(UCL) +1(FP)
26	Slovenia	11.831	2	
27	Cyprus	11.498	2	
28	FR Yugoslavia	11.415	2	+1(UCL)
29	Bulgaria	10.540	2	+1(UCL)
30	Georgia	9.666	2	
31	Latvia	8.332	2	
32	Finland	8.041	2	+1(UCL) +1(FP)
33	Belarus	7.583	2	+1(FP)
34	Moldova	6.333	2	
35	Iceland	6.332	2	

Rank	Association	Coeff.	Teams	Notes
36	Macedonia	5.081	2	
37	Lithuania	4.665	2	
38	Estonia	2.582	2	
39	Wales	2.332	2	
40	Armenia	2.249	2	
41	Republic of Ireland	1.665	2	
42	Malta	1.498	2	
43	Northern Ireland	1.498	2	
44	Faroe Islands	1.415	2	
45	Luxembourg	1.332	2	
46	Azerbaijan	1.249	2	
47	Liechtenstein	1.000	1	
48	Albania	0.832	2	
49	Bosnia and Herzegovina	0.500	2	
50	Andorra	0.000	1	
51	San Marino	0.000	1	

Notes

- (FP): Additional fair play berth (Finland, Slovakia, Belarus)
- (UCL): Additional teams transferred from the UEFA Champions League
- (IT): Additional teams from Intertoto Cup

=== Distribution ===
	Teams entering in this round	Teams advancing from previous round	Teams transferred from Champions League
Qualifying round (82 teams)	31 domestic cup winners from associations 19–49; 33 domestic league runners-up from associations 16–49; 13 domestic league third-placed teams from associations 9–21; 3 teams from the Fair Play rankings; 2 domestic league champions teams from Andorra and San Marino		
First round (96 teams)	18 domestic cup winners from associations 1–18; 2 domestic league third-placed teams from associations 7–8; 5 domestic league fourth-placed teams from associations 4–8; 8 domestic league fifth-placed teams from associations 1–8; 3 domestic league sixth-placed teams from associations 1–3; 3 winners of the Intertoto Cup	41 winners from the qualifying round	16 losing teams from Champions League qualifying
Second round (48 teams)		48 winners from the first round	
Third round (32 teams)		24 winners from the second round	8 third placed teams from the Champions League first group stage
Fourth round (16 teams)		16 winners from the third round	
Play-offs (8 teams)		8 winners from the fourth round play the quarter-finals, semi-finals and final	

=== Redistribution rules ===
A UEFA Cup place is vacated when a team qualify for both the Champions League and the UEFA Cup, or qualify for the UEFA Cup by more than one method. When a place is vacated, it is redistributed within the national association by the following rules:

- When the domestic cup winners (considered as the "highest-placed" qualifier within the national association) also qualify for the Champions League, their UEFA Cup place is vacated, and the remaining UEFA Cup qualifiers are moved up one place, with the final place (with the earliest starting round) taken by the domestic cup runners-up, provided they do not already qualify for the Champions League or the UEFA Cup. Otherwise, this place is taken by the highest-placed league finisher which do not qualify for the UEFA Cup yet.
- When the domestic cup winners also qualify for the UEFA Cup through league position, their place through the league position is vacated, and the UEFA Cup qualifiers which finish lower in the league are moved up one place, with the final place taken by the highest-placed league finisher which do not qualify for the UEFA Cup yet.
- A place vacated by the League Cup winners is taken by the highest-placed league finisher which do not qualify for the UEFA Cup yet.
- A Fair Play place is taken by the highest-ranked team in the domestic Fair Play table which do not qualify for the Champions League or UEFA Cup yet.

=== Teams ===
The labels in the parentheses show how each team qualified for the place of its starting round:

- CW: Cup winners
- CR: Cup runners-up
- LC: League Cup winners
- Nth: League position
- P-W: End-of-season European competition play-off winners
- FP: Fair play
- IT: Intertoto Cup winners
- CL: Relegated from the Champions League
  - GS: Third-placed teams from the group stage
  - Q3: Losers from the third qualifying round

Third round
(Spain) Mallorca (CL GS)	(France) Lyon (CL GS)	(Netherlands) PSV Eindhoven (CL GS)	(Russia) Lokomotiv Moscow (CL GS)
(Germany) Borussia Dortmund (CL GS)	(France) Lille (CL GS)	(Netherlands) Feyenoord (CL GS)	(Scotland) Celtic (CL GS)
First round
(Spain) Zaragoza (CW)	(England) Chelsea (6th)	(Turkey) Gençlerbirliği (CW)	(Austria) Tirol Innsbruck (CL Q3)
(Spain) Valencia (5th)	(Netherlands) Twente (CW)	(Ukraine) Dnipro Dnipropetrovsk (3rd)	(Denmark) Copenhagen (CL Q3)
(Spain) Celta Vigo (6th)	(Netherlands) Roda JC (4th)	(Norway) Odd Grenland (CW)	(Poland) Wisła Kraków (CL Q3)
(Italy) Fiorentina (CW)	(Netherlands) Utrecht (5th)	(Switzerland) Servette (CW)	(Romania) Steaua București (CL Q3)
(Italy) Internazionale (5th)	(Russia) Torpedo Moscow (3rd)	(Scotland) Hibernian (3rd)	(Croatia) Hajduk Split (CL Q3)
(Italy) Milan (6th)	(Russia) Anzhi Makhachkala (4th)	(Austria) Kärnten (CW)	(Sweden) Halmstads BK (CL Q3)
(Germany) Hertha BSC (5th)	(Russia) Dynamo Moscow (5th)	(Belgium) Westerlo (CW)	(Slovakia) Inter Slovnaft Bratislava (CL Q3)
(Germany) SC Freiburg (6th)	(Russia) Chernomorets Novorossiysk (6th)	(Denmark) Silkeborg (CW)	(Federal Republic of Yugoslavia) Red Star Belgrade (CL Q3)
(Germany) Union Berlin (CR)	(Czech Republic) Viktoria Žižkov (CW)	(Italy) Parma (CL Q3)	(Bulgaria) Levski Sofia (CL Q3)
(France) Strasbourg (CW)	(Czech Republic) Sigma Olomouc (3rd)	(Netherlands) Ajax (CL Q3)	(Finland) Haka (CL Q3)
(France) Bordeaux (4th)	(Czech Republic) Marila Příbram (4th)	(Czech Republic) Slavia Prague (CL Q3)	(France) Troyes (IC)
(France) Sedan (5th)	(Czech Republic) Slovan Liberec (6th)	(Ukraine) Shakhtar Donetsk (CL Q3)	(France) Paris Saint-Germain (IC)
(England) Leeds United (4th)	(Greece) PAOK (CW)	(Switzerland) Grasshopper (CL Q3)	(England) Aston Villa (IC)
(England) Ipswich Town (5th)	(Portugal) Sporting CP (3rd)	(Scotland) Rangers (CL Q3)	
Qualifying round
(Greece) AEK Athens (3rd)	(Croatia) Varteks (4th)	(Finland) HJK (CW)	(Malta) Sliema Wanderers (2nd)
(Portugal) Marítimo (CR)	(Sweden) IF Elfsborg (CW)	(Finland) Jokerit (2nd)	(Malta) Birkirkara (CR)
(Turkey) Gaziantepspor (3rd)	(Sweden) Helsingborgs IF (2nd)	(Belarus) Belshina Bobruisk (CW)	(Northern Ireland) Glentoran (CW)
(Ukraine) CSKA Kyiv (CR)	(Hungary) Debrecen (CW)	(Belarus) BATE Borisov (2nd)	(Northern Ireland) Glenavon (2nd)
(Norway) Viking (3rd)	(Hungary) Dunaferr (2nd)	(Moldova) Zimbru Chișinău (2nd)	(Faroe Islands) GÍ (CW)
(Switzerland) St. Gallen (3rd)	(Israel) Maccabi Tel Aviv (CW)	(Moldova) Nistru Otaci (CR)	(Faroe Islands) HB (2nd)
(Scotland) Kilmarnock (4th)	(Israel) Hapoel Tel Aviv (2nd)	(Iceland) ÍA (CW)	(Luxembourg) Etzella Ettelbruck (CW)
(Austria) Rapid Wien (2nd)	(Slovakia) Slovan Bratislava (2nd)	(Iceland) Fylkir (2nd)	(Luxembourg) Grevenmacher (2nd)
(Austria) GAK (3rd)	(Slovakia) Ružomberok (3rd)	(North Macedonia) Pelister (CW)	(Azerbaijan) Shafa Baku (CW)
(Belgium) Club Brugge (2nd)	(Slovenia) HIT Gorica (CW)	(North Macedonia) Vardar (2nd)	(Azerbaijan) Neftçi (2nd)
(Belgium) Standard Liège (3rd)	(Slovenia) Olimpija Ljubljana (2nd)	(Lithuania) Atlantas (CW)	(Liechtenstein) Vaduz (CW)
(Denmark) Brøndby (2nd)	(Cyprus) Apollon Limassol (CW)	(Lithuania) Žalgiris (2nd)	(Albania) Tirana (CW)
(Denmark) Midtjylland (4th)	(Cyprus) Olympiakos Nicosia (2nd)	(Estonia) Narva Trans (CW)	(Albania) Dinamo Tirana (3rd)
(Poland) Polonia Warsaw (CW)	(Federal Republic of Yugoslavia) Partizan (CW)	(Estonia) Flora (2nd)	(Bosnia and Herzegovina) Brotnjo (2nd)
(Poland) Pogoń Szczecin (2nd)	(Federal Republic of Yugoslavia) Obilić (3rd)	(Wales) Cwmbrân Town (2nd)	(Bosnia and Herzegovina) Sarajevo (3rd)
(Poland) Legia Warsaw (3rd)	(Bulgaria) Litex Lovech (CW)	(Wales) Total Network Solutions (CR)	(Andorra) FC Santa Coloma (1st)
(Romania) Dinamo București (CW)	(Bulgaria) CSKA Sofia (2nd)	(Armenia) Mika (CW)	(San Marino) Cosmos (1st)
(Romania) Brașov (3rd)	(Georgia (country)) Locomotive Tbilisi (2nd)	(Armenia) Ararat Yerevan (2nd)	(Slovakia) Matador Púchov (FP)
(Romania) Rapid București (4th)	(Georgia (country)) Dinamo Tbilisi (3rd)	(Republic of Ireland) Shelbourne (2nd)	(Finland) MYPA (FP)
(Croatia) Dinamo Zagreb (CW)	(Latvia) Ventspils (2nd)	(Republic of Ireland) Longford Town (CR)	(Belarus) Shakhtyor Soligorsk (FP)
(Croatia) Osijek (3rd)	(Latvia) Dinaburg (CR)		

== Round and draw dates ==
The schedule of the competition was as follows. Matches were scheduled for Thursdays apart from the final, which took place on a Wednesday, though exceptionally could take place on Tuesdays or Wednesdays due to scheduling conflicts.

Schedule for 2001–02 UEFA Cup
Round	Draw date	First leg	Second leg
Qualifying round	22 June 2001	9 August 2001	23 August 2001
First round	24 August 2001	20 September 2001 (Note: The first leg matches of the first round, originally scheduled in principle for 13 September, were postponed to the following week due to the September 11 attacks.)	27 September 2001
Second round	28 September 2001	18 October 2001	1 November 2001
Third round	2 November 2001	22 November 2001	6 December 2001
Fourth round	12 December 2001	21 February 2002	28 February 2002
Quarter-finals	12 December 2001	14 March 2002	21 March 2002
Semi-finals	22 March 2002	4 April 2002	11 April 2002
Final	22 March 2002	8 May 2002 at Feijenoord Stadion, Rotterdam	

== Qualifying round ==
The first legs were played on 9 August, and the second legs were played on 23 August 2001.

Team 1	Agg.	Team 2	1st leg	2nd leg
Cosmos (San Marino)	0–3	(Austria) Rapid Wien	0–1	0–2
Pelister (North Macedonia)	3–4	(Switzerland) St. Gallen	0–2	3–2
Dinamo București (Romania)	4–1	(Albania) Dinamo Tirana	1–0	3–1
Olimpija Ljubljana (Slovenia)	7–0	(Azerbaijan) Shafa Baku	4–0	3–0
Midtjylland (Denmark)	5–1	(Northern Ireland) Glentoran	1–1	4–0
Narva Trans (Estonia)	3–5	(Sweden) IF Elfsborg	3–0 (Note: Narva Trans awarded 3–0 as Elfsborg fielded an ineligible player, Christian Lundström. The score at the moment was 1–3.)	0–5
Club Brugge (Belgium)	10–1	(Iceland) ÍA	4–0	6–1
Obilić (Federal Republic of Yugoslavia)	5–1	(Faroe Islands) GÍ	4–0	1–1
Brașov (Romania)	7–1	(Armenia) Mika	5–1	2–0
Viking (Norway)	2–1	(Bosnia and Herzegovina) Brotnjo	1–0	1–1
CSKA Kyiv (Ukraine)	4–0	(Finland) Jokerit	2–0	2–0
Vardar (North Macedonia)	1–6	(Belgium) Standard Liège	0–3	1–3
HJK (Finland)	3–1	(Latvia) Ventspils	2–1	1–0
Cwmbrân Town (Wales)	0–5	(Slovakia) Slovan Bratislava	0–4	0–1
Marítimo (Portugal)	2–0	(Bosnia and Herzegovina) Sarajevo	1–0	1–0
Fylkir (Iceland)	3–2	(Poland) Pogoń Szczecin	2–1	1–1
Dinamo Zagreb (Croatia)	2–0	(Estonia) Flora	1–0	1–0
Glenavon (Northern Ireland)	0–2	(Scotland) Kilmarnock	0–1	0–1
Tirana (Albania)	4–5	(Cyprus) Apollon Limassol	3–2	1–3
Ararat Yerevan (Armenia)	0–5	(Israel) Hapoel Tel Aviv	0–2	0–3
Etzella Ettelbruck (Luxembourg)	1–6	(Poland) Legia Warsaw	0–4	1–2
Zimbru Chișinău (Moldova)	1–4	(Turkey) Gaziantepspor	0–0	1–4
Dinaburg (Latvia)	2–2 (a)	(Croatia) Osijek	2–1	0–1
Neftçi (Azerbaijan)	0–1	(Slovenia) HIT Gorica	0–0	0–1
HB (Faroe Islands)	2–6	(Austria) GAK	2–2	0–4
Atlantas (Lithuania)	0–12	(Romania) Rapid București	0–4	0–8
Matador Púchov (Slovakia)	4–2	(Malta) Sliema Wanderers	3–0	1–2
Longford Town (Republic of Ireland)	1–3	(Bulgaria) Litex Lovech	1–1	0–2
Brøndby (Denmark)	5–0	(Republic of Ireland) Shelbourne	2–0	3–0
FC Santa Coloma (Andorra)	1–8	(Federal Republic of Yugoslavia) Partizan	0–1	1–7
Maccabi Tel Aviv (Israel)	7–0	(Lithuania) Žalgiris	6–0	1–0
Shakhtyor Soligorsk (Belarus)	2–5	(Bulgaria) CSKA Sofia	1–2	1–3
MYPA (Finland)	2–5	(Sweden) Helsingborgs IF	1–3	1–2
Dinamo Tbilisi (Georgia (country))	2–5	(Belarus) BATE Borisov	2–1	0–4
Debrecen (Hungary)	3–1	(Moldova) Nistru Otaci	3–0	0–1
Polonia Warsaw (Poland)	6–0	(Wales) Total Network Solutions	4–0	2–0
Birkirkara (Malta)	1–1 (a)	(Georgia (country)) Locomotive Tbilisi	0–0	1–1
AEK Athens (Greece)	8–0	(Luxembourg) Grevenmacher	6–0	2–0
Ružomberok (Slovakia)	3–1	(Belarus) Belshina Bobruisk	3–1	0–0
Olympiakos Nicosia (Cyprus)	6–4	(Hungary) Dunaferr	2–2	4–2
Vaduz (Liechtenstein)	4–9	(Croatia) Varteks	3–3	1–6

== First round ==
The first round featured the 41 winners of the qualifying round, joined by 36 directly qualified teams, the 16 losers of the Champions League third qualifying round and the 3 winners for the Intertoto Cup. The first legs were played on 11, 18, 19 and 20 September, and the second legs were played on 25 and 27 September 2001.

The matches scheduled for 12 September were postponed due to the September 11 attacks. Most of the postponed fixtures were rescheduled for 20 September, with all matches observing a moment of silence.

Team 1	Agg.	Team 2	1st leg	2nd leg
Inter Slovnaft Bratislava (Slovakia)	1–3	(Bulgaria) Litex Lovech	1–0	0–3
Internazionale (Italy)	6–0	(Romania) Brașov	3–0	3–0
Servette (Switzerland)	2–1	(Czech Republic) Slavia Prague	1–0	1–1
Roda JC (Netherlands)	6–1	(Iceland) Fylkir	3–0	3–1
CSKA Kyiv (Ukraine)	3–2	(Federal Republic of Yugoslavia) Red Star Belgrade	3–2	0–0
Gençlerbirliği (Turkey)	1–2	(Sweden) Halmstads BK	1–1	0–1
AEK Athens (Greece)	4–3	(Scotland) Hibernian	2–0	2–3 (a.e.t.)
Olimpija Ljubljana (Slovenia)	2–4	(Denmark) Brøndby	2–4	0–0
Utrecht (Netherlands)	6–3	(Austria) GAK	3–0	3–3
Slovan Liberec (Czech Republic)	2–1	(Slovakia) Slovan Bratislava	2–0	0–1
Copenhagen (Denmark)	4–2	(Federal Republic of Yugoslavia) Obilić	2–0	2–2
CSKA Sofia (Bulgaria)	4–2	(Ukraine) Shakhtar Donetsk	3–0	1–2
Standard Liège (Belgium)	4–2	(France) Strasbourg	2–0	2–2
BATE Borisov (Belarus)	0–6	(Italy) Milan	0–2	0–4
Chernomorets Novorossiysk (Russia)	0–6	(Spain) Valencia	0–1	0–5
Aston Villa (England)	3–3 (a)	(Croatia) Varteks	2–3	1–0
Parma (Italy)	3–0	(Finland) HJK	1–0	2–0
HIT Gorica (Slovenia)	1–3	(Croatia) Osijek	1–2	0–1
Ipswich Town (England)	3–2	(Russia) Torpedo Moscow	1–1	2–1
Kilmarnock (Scotland)	1–3	(Norway) Viking	1–1	0–2
Ajax (Netherlands)	5–0	(Cyprus) Apollon Limassol	2–0	3–0
Zaragoza (Spain)	5–1	(Denmark) Silkeborg	3–0	2–1
Dinamo București (Romania)	2–6	(Switzerland) Grasshopper	1–3	1–3
Marila Příbram (Czech Republic)	5–3	(France) Sedan	4–0	1–3
Troyes (France)	6–2	(Slovakia) Ružomberok	6–1	0–1
Legia Warsaw (Poland)	10–2	(Sweden) IF Elfsborg	4–1	6–1
Westerlo (Belgium)	0–3	(Germany) Hertha BSC	0–2	0–1
Chelsea (England)	5–0	(Bulgaria) Levski Sofia	3–0	2–0
Kärnten (Austria)	0–4	(Greece) PAOK	0–0	0–4
Dynamo Moscow (Russia)	1–0	(Malta) Birkirkara	1–0	0–0
Dnipro Dnipropetrovsk (Ukraine)	1–2	(Italy) Fiorentina	0–0	1–2
St. Gallen (Switzerland)	3–2	(Romania) Steaua București	2–1	1–1
Bordeaux (France)	6–4	(Hungary) Debrecen	5–1	1–3
Hapoel Tel Aviv (Israel)	2–1	(Turkey) Gaziantepspor	1–0	1–1
Haka (Finland)	1–4	(Germany) Union Berlin	1–1	0–3
Partizan (Federal Republic of Yugoslavia)	2–5	(Austria) Rapid Wien	1–0	1–5
Celta Vigo (Spain)	7–4	(Czech Republic) Sigma Olomouc	4–0	3–4
Midtjylland (Denmark)	2–6	(Portugal) Sporting CP	0–3	2–3
Anzhi Makhachkala (Russia)	0–1 (Note: Only one leg was played, in a neutral venue in Warsaw, Poland, due to security concerns in Russia.)	(Scotland) Rangers		
Hajduk Split (Croatia)	2–3	(Poland) Wisła Kraków	2–2	0–1
Paris Saint-Germain (France)	3–0	(Romania) Rapid București	0–0	3–0 (a.e.t.) (Note: Paris Saint-Germain were awarded a 3–0 win because there was a blackout in Bucharest at that time and the match was abandoned.)
Marítimo (Portugal)	1–3	(England) Leeds United	1–0	0–3
Olympiakos Nicosia (Cyprus)	3–9	(Belgium) Club Brugge	2–2	1–7
Odd Grenland (Norway)	3–3 (a)	(Sweden) Helsingborgs IF	2–2	1–1
Viktoria Žižkov (Czech Republic)	0–1	(Austria) Tirol Innsbruck	0–0	0–1
Dinamo Zagreb (Croatia)	3–3 (a)	(Israel) Maccabi Tel Aviv	2–2	1–1
Polonia Warsaw (Poland)	1–4	(Netherlands) Twente	1–2	0–2
Matador Púchov (Slovakia)	1–2	(Germany) SC Freiburg	0–0	1–2

== Second round ==
The second round featured the 48 winners of the first round. The first legs were played on 16 and 18 October, and the second legs were played on 30 October and 1 November 2001.

Team 1	Agg.	Team 2	1st leg	2nd leg
Roda JC (Netherlands)	5–3	(Israel) Maccabi Tel Aviv	4–1	1–2
Legia Warsaw (Poland)	2–7	(Spain) Valencia	1–1	1–6
SC Freiburg (Germany)	4–2	(Switzerland) St. Gallen	0–1	4–1
Bordeaux (France)	4–0	(Belgium) Standard Liège	2–0	2–0
Fiorentina (Italy)	4–2	(Austria) Tirol Innsbruck	2–0	2–2
Ipswich Town (England)	3–1	(Sweden) Helsingborgs IF	0–0	3–1
Paris Saint-Germain (France)	6–2	(Austria) Rapid Wien	4–0	2–2
Union Berlin (Germany)	0–2	(Bulgaria) Litex Lovech	0–2	0–0
Copenhagen (Denmark)	1–0	(Netherlands) Ajax	0–0	1–0
Internazionale (Italy)	2–1	(Poland) Wisła Kraków	2–0	0–1
PAOK (Greece)	8–3	(Czech Republic) Marila Příbram	6–1	2–2
Rangers (Scotland)	7–2	(Russia) Dynamo Moscow	3–1	4–1
Halmstads BK (Sweden)	1–7	(Portugal) Sporting CP	0–1	1–6
Zaragoza (Spain)	0–1	(Switzerland) Servette	0–0	0–1
Leeds United (England)	6–5	(France) Troyes	4–2	2–3
CSKA Kyiv (Ukraine)	0–7	(Belgium) Club Brugge	0–2	0–5
Utrecht (Netherlands)	1–3	(Italy) Parma	1–3	0–0
Osijek (Croatia)	3–5	(Greece) AEK Athens	1–2	2–3
Viking (Norway)	0–3	(Germany) Hertha BSC	0–1	0–2
Grasshopper (Switzerland)	6–4	(Netherlands) Twente	4–1	2–3
Varteks (Croatia)	3–6	(Denmark) Brøndby	3–1	0–5
Hapoel Tel Aviv (Israel)	3–1	(England) Chelsea	2–0	1–1
Celta Vigo (Spain)	3–4	(Czech Republic) Slovan Liberec	3–1	0–3
Milan (Italy)	3–0	(Bulgaria) CSKA Sofia	2–0	1–0

== Final phase ==
In the final phase, teams played against each other over two legs on a home-and-away basis, except for the one-match final. The mechanism of the draws for each round was as follows:

- In the draws for the third and fourth rounds, teams were seeded and divided into groups containing an equal number of seeded and unseeded teams. In each group, the seeded teams were drawn against the unseeded teams, with the first team drawn hosting the first leg. Teams from the same association could not be drawn against each other.
- In the draws for the quarter-finals onwards, there were no seedings and teams from the same association could be drawn against each other.

=== Bracket ===
Third round
(England) Ipswich Town	1	1	2
(Italy) Internazionale	0	4	4
(Greece) AEK Athens	3	1	4
(Bulgaria) Litex Lovech	2	1	3
(Spain) Valencia (p)	1	0	1 (5)
(Scotland) Celtic	0	1	1 (4)
(Switzerland) Servette	0	3	3
(Germany) Hertha BSC	0	0	0
(Greece) PAOK	3	1	4
(Netherlands) PSV Eindhoven	2	4	6
(Switzerland) Grasshopper	1	2	3
(England) Leeds United	2	2	4
(Scotland) Rangers (p)	0	0	0 (4)
(France) Paris Saint-Germain	0	0	0 (3)
(Netherlands) Feyenoord	1	2	3
(Germany) SC Freiburg	0	2	2
(Belgium) Club Brugge	4	0	4
(France) Lyon (a)	1	3	4
(Czech Republic) Slovan Liberec	3	2	5
(Spain) Mallorca	1	1	2
(Italy) Fiorentina	0	0	0
(France) Lille	1	2	3
(Denmark) Copenhagen	0	0	0
(Germany) Borussia Dortmund	1	1	2
(Israel) Hapoel Tel Aviv	2	1	3
(Russia) Lokomotiv Moscow	1	0	1
(Italy) Parma	1	3	4
(Denmark) Brøndby	1	0	1
(France) Bordeaux	1	0	1
(Netherlands) Roda JC	0	2	2
(Italy) Milan	2	1	3
(Portugal) Sporting CP	0	1	1

Fourth round
(Italy) Internazionale	3	2	5
(Greece) AEK Athens	1	2	3
(Spain) Valencia	3	2	5
(Switzerland) Servette	0	2	2
(Netherlands) PSV Eindhoven	0	1	1
(England) Leeds United	0	0	0
(Scotland) Rangers	1	2	3
(Netherlands) Feyenoord	1	3	4
(France) Lyon	1	1	2
(Czech Republic) Slovan Liberec	1	4	5
(France) Lille	1	0	1
(Germany) Borussia Dortmund (a)	1	0	1
(Israel) Hapoel Tel Aviv	0	2	2
(Italy) Parma	0	1	1
(Netherlands) Roda JC	0	1	1 (2)
(Italy) Milan (p)	1	0	1 (3)

Quarter-finals
(Italy) Internazionale	1	1	2
(Spain) Valencia	1	0	1
(Netherlands) PSV Eindhoven	1	1	2 (4)
(Netherlands) Feyenoord (p)	1	1	2 (5)
(Czech Republic) Slovan Liberec	0	0	0
(Germany) Borussia Dortmund	0	4	4
(Israel) Hapoel Tel Aviv	1	0	1
(Italy) Milan	0	2	2

Semi-finals
(Italy) Internazionale	0	2	2
(Netherlands) Feyenoord	1	2	3
(Germany) Borussia Dortmund	4	1	5
(Italy) Milan	0	3	3

Final
8 May – Rotterdam
(Netherlands) Feyenoord	3
(Germany) Borussia Dortmund	2

=== Third round ===
The draw for the third round was held on 2 November 2001, 13:00 CET. The first legs were played on 20 and 22 November, and the second legs were played on 4 and 6 December 2001.

Team 1	Agg.	Team 2	1st leg	2nd leg
PAOK (Greece)	4–6	(Netherlands) PSV Eindhoven	3–2	1–4
Fiorentina (Italy)	0–3	(France) Lille	0–1	0–2
Valencia (Spain)	1–1 (5–4 p)	(Scotland) Celtic	1–0	0–1 (a.e.t.)
Servette (Switzerland)	3–0	(Germany) Hertha BSC	0–0	3–0
Ipswich Town (England)	2–4	(Italy) Internazionale	1–0	1–4
Rangers (Scotland)	0–0 (4–3 p) (Note: Order of legs reversed after original draw.)	(France) Paris Saint-Germain	0–0	0–0 (a.e.t.)
Feyenoord (Netherlands)	3–2	(Germany) SC Freiburg	1–0	2–2
AEK Athens (Greece)	4–3	(Bulgaria) Litex Lovech	3–2	1–1
Grasshopper (Switzerland)	3–4	(England) Leeds United	1–2	2–2
Parma (Italy)	4–1	(Denmark) Brøndby	1–1	3–0
Bordeaux (France)	1–2	(Netherlands) Roda JC	1–0	0–2
Slovan Liberec (Czech Republic)	5–2	(Spain) Mallorca	3–1	2–1
Hapoel Tel Aviv (Israel)	3–1	(Russia) Lokomotiv Moscow	2–1	1–0
Copenhagen (Denmark)	0–2	(Germany) Borussia Dortmund	0–1	0–1
Milan (Italy)	3–1	(Portugal) Sporting CP	2–0	1–1
Club Brugge (Belgium)	4–4 (a)	(France) Lyon	4–1	0–3

=== Fourth round ===
The draw for the fourth round was held on 12 December 2001, 12:00 CET. The first legs were played on 19 and 21 February, and the second legs were played on 28 February 2002.

Team 1	Agg.	Team 2	1st leg	2nd leg
Internazionale (Italy)	5–3	(Greece) AEK Athens	3–1	2–2
Valencia (Spain)	5–2	(Switzerland) Servette	3–0	2–2
PSV Eindhoven (Netherlands)	1–0	(England) Leeds United	0–0	1–0
Rangers (Scotland)	3–4	(Netherlands) Feyenoord	1–1	2–3
Lyon (France)	2–5	(Czech Republic) Slovan Liberec	1–1	1–4
Lille (France)	1–1 (a)	(Germany) Borussia Dortmund	1–1	0–0
Hapoel Tel Aviv (Israel)	2–1	(Italy) Parma	0–0	2–1
Roda JC (Netherlands)	1–1 (2–3 p) (Note: Order of legs reversed after original draw.)	(Italy) Milan	0–1	1–0 (a.e.t.)

=== Quarter-finals ===
The draw for the quarter-finals was held on 12 December 2001, 12:00 CET, immediately after the fourth round draw. The first legs were played on 14 March, and the second legs were played on 21 March 2002.

Team 1	Agg.	Team 2	1st leg	2nd leg
Internazionale (Italy)	2–1	(Spain) Valencia	1–1	1–0
PSV Eindhoven (Netherlands)	2–2 (4–5 p)	(Netherlands) Feyenoord	1–1	1–1 (a.e.t.)
Slovan Liberec (Czech Republic)	0–4 (Note: Order of legs reversed after original draw.)	(Germany) Borussia Dortmund	0–0	0–4
Hapoel Tel Aviv (Israel)	1–2	(Italy) Milan	1–0	0–2

=== Semi-finals ===
The draw for the semi-finals was held on 22 March 2002, 13:00 CET. The first legs were played on 4 April, and the second legs were played on 11 April 2002.

Team 1	Agg.	Team 2	1st leg	2nd leg
Internazionale (Italy)	2–3	(Netherlands) Feyenoord	0–1	2–2
Borussia Dortmund (Germany)	5–3 (Note: Order of legs reversed after original draw.)	(Italy) Milan	4–0	1–3

=== Final ===
The final was played on 8 May 2002 at Feijenoord Stadion in Rotterdam, Netherlands.

8 May 2002
20:45 UTC+2

Feyenoord (Netherlands)	3–2	(Germany) Borussia Dortmund
Van Hooijdonk 33' (pen.), 40'; Tomasson 50'	Report	Amoroso 47' (pen.); Koller 58'

Feijenoord Stadion, Rotterdam
Attendance: 45,611
Referee: Vítor Melo Pereira (Portugal)

== Top goalscorers ==
Rank	Player	Club	Goals	Minutes played
1	(Netherlands) Pierre van Hooijdonk	(Netherlands) Feyenoord	8	750'
2	(Brazil) Mário Jardel	(Portugal) Sporting CP	6	490'
2	(Uruguay) Richard Núñez	(Switzerland) Grasshopper	6	516'
2	(Sierra Leone) Mohamed Kallon	(Italy) Internazionale	6	902'
5	(Czech Republic) Jan Nezmar	(Czech Republic) Slovan Liberec	5	355'
5	(Cyprus) Yiasoumis Yiasoumi	(Greece) PAOK	5	382'
5	(Portugal) Pauleta	(France) Bordeaux	5	539'
5	(Brazil) Márcio Amoroso	(Germany) Borussia Dortmund	5	644'
5	(Slovenia) Milan Osterc	(Israel) Hapoel Tel Aviv	5	797'

== See also ==
- 2001–02 UEFA Champions League
- 2001 UEFA Intertoto Cup
