= F. Tulga Ocak =

Turkish academic (1946–2019)

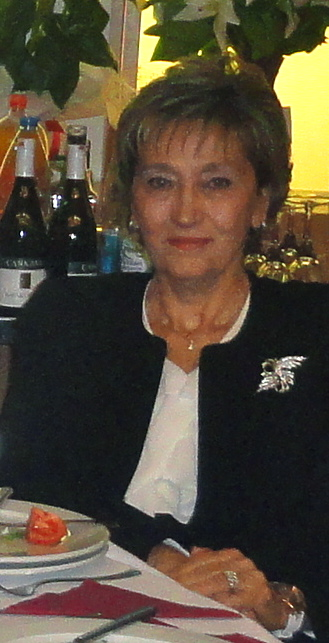
- F. Tulga Ocak, November 2011
- Born: 14 May 1946; Gaziantep, Turkey
- Died: 20 November 2019 (aged 73); Ankara
- Resting place: Ankara
- Citizenship: Turkey
- Education: Ankara University; Tehran University
- Known for: Classical Turkish poetry Nef'i
- Scientific career
- Fields: Divan poetry
- Workplaces: Hacettepe University
- Doctoral advisor: Mehdi Mohaghegh

F. Tulga Ocak (14 May 1946 – 20 November 2019) was a Turkish academic and professor of classical Turkish literature and Persian language. She worked at Hacettepe University.

== Early life and education ==
Ocak was born on 14 May 1946 in Gaziantep. She is the daughter of Ali Kemal Ocak (1911-1964), a member of the Turkish parliament for Democrat Party from Gaziantep for three terms between 1950 and 1960 and elder brother of Kamil Ocak. After graduating from TED Ankara College she obtained a Bachelor of Arts degree in Turkish literature from Ankara University in 1968. Her undergraduate thesis is about the divan of Selanikli Esat. She received PhD from Tehran University and the title of her thesis is Aḥvāl va ās̲ār va taḥlīl-i ashʻār-i dīvān-i Fārsī-i Aḥmad Dāʻī. The advisor of the thesis is Iranian academic and scholar Mehdi Mohaghegh. The study which is about the Persian divan of Ahmad Dai, an early Ottoman poet, was published in Persian in 2006.

== Career ==
Ocak was a faculty member in the department of Turkish language and literature at Hacettepe University until May 2013. She was among the early members of the department. In 1980, she became associate professor and her study for the title was entitled Nef'i and his Turkish divan. She became professor in 1988. In 1991, she was appointed first vice rector of Ahmet Yesevi University in Kazakhstan. She was the head of the department of Turkish language and literature at Hacettepe University from 2005 to 2009.

== Work ==
Ocak analysed poems and divan of Nef'i, a major poet in Ottoman poetry. She also published articles about other divan poets, including Sultan Veled. She is the coeditor of Ölümünün üçyüzellinci yılında Nef'î (1991) which is concerned with the works of Nef'i. She is the editor of the second edition of Modern Bilimin Doğuşunda Bizans'ın Etkisi Var mıdır?, a book by Sevim Tekeli. She participated in various conferences on Persian literature last of which was in Tehran in May 2010.

Her pupils and colleagues published a book for her in 2013, entitled Prof. Dr. F. Tulga Ocak'a Armağan.
