= Marios Themistokleous =

Cypriot footballer (born 1975)

Personal information
- Full name: Marios Themistokleous
- Date of birth: April 1, 1975 (age 51)
- Place of birth: Nicosia, Cyprus
- Height: 1.76 m (5 ft 9 in)
- Position: Attacking midfielder

Senior career*
Years	Team	Apps	(Gls)
1995–1997	Olympiakos Nicosia	49	(7)
1998–1999	Apollon	25	(4)
1999–2004	Olympiakos Nicosia	122	(39)
2004–2005	AC Omonia	15	(0)
2005–2007	Olympiakos Nicosia	50	(5)
2007–2009	Digenis Akritas Morphou	49	(14)
2009–2010	Olympiakos Nicosia	23	(3)
2010–2011	Chalkanoras Idaliou	24	(4)

International career^{‡}
2000–2004	Cyprus	6	(0)

Managerial career
- 2011–2012: Chalkanoras Idaliou
- 2013–2014: Adonis Idaliou
- * Club domestic league appearances and goals ‡ National team caps and goals as of 9 December 2009

Marios Themistokleous (Greek: Μάριος Θεμιστοκλέους; born April 1, 1975, in Cyprus) is a retired Cypriot football midfielder. He mostly played for Olympiakos Nicosia and was the team captain. He has also played for the Cypriot National Team. He started his youth career at Chalkanoras Idaliou his local team and ended his career there in 2011.
