= Zührenaz Ocak =

Turkish karateka (born 2006)

- Born: 2006 (age 19–20); Taşköprü, Yalova, Turkey
- Nationality: Turkish
- Style: Karate Kumite, Kata
- Team: Taşköprü Karate SK
- Trainer: Mehmet Güney

Zührenaz Ocak (born 2006) is a Turkish karateka who competes in the kumite +68 kg and kata events.

== Sport career ==
Ocak is a member of Taşköprü Karate SK in her hometown, where she is coached by Mehmet Güney.

She captured three gold medals, in the 16-17 age group kata, junior women's kumite 68 kg and open category at the Turkish Interprovincial Deaf Karate Tournament held in Istanbul in October 2023. At the 2024 Turkish Para Karate-Veterans Deaf Karate Championships in Ankara, she became champion in the +68 kg event. She so qualified to be included in the national team. In August the same year, she won the gold medal at the Turkish Cadets, Juniors, U21 Karate Championships in Sivas. She won the gold medal in the kumite +68 kg event at the 34th International Bosphorus Karate Tournament in Istanbul in December 2024. In February 2025, she became champion in the +68 kg event at the Turkish Deaf Karate Championships in Trabzon.

At the 2025 Summer Deaflympics in Tokyo, Japan, she took a bronze medal in the kumite +68 kg event.

== Personal life ==
Born in 2006, Zührenaz Ocak is a native of Taşköprü, Yalova, northwestern Turkey.
