= Kamil Ocak =

Turkish politician (1914–1969)

Mehmet Kamil Ocak

Minister for Sport
- In office 27 October 1965 – 21 May 1969
- Prime Minister: Süleyman Demirel

Personal details
- Born: 19 February 1914 Gaziantep, Aleppo Vilayet, Ottoman Empire
- Died: 21 May 1969 (aged 55) Ankara
- Resting place: Gaziantep
- Party: Justice Party
- Spouse: Mübeccel Ocak
- Education: Robert College

Mehmet Kamil Ocak (19 February 1914 – 21 May 1969) was a Turkish politician and served as minister of state from 1965 to 1969.

== Early life and education ==
Ocak was born in Gaziantep in the Aleppo Vilayet of the Ottoman Empire on 19 February 1914. His father was Mustafa Ocak, one of the former mayors of Gaziantep and a Mevlevi Sheikh. Kamil Ocak graduated from commercial department of Robert College in 1935.

== Early experience ==
After graduation, Ocak worked for three years at the Central Bank of Turkey. In 1940, he became the director of the weaver's cooperative in Gaziantep and served there for eight years. In 1948, he was appointed director of the Association of Pistachio and Agriculture Cooperatives by the Ministry of Commerce. His term lasted until 1960.

== Political career ==
In 1941, Ocak began to take part in political activities in Gaziantep. In 1946 elections, he was an MP candidate from Democrat Party (DP). In 1950, he was elected as DP's local district chair and in 1951, as DP's province chair which lasted until 1957. From 17 November 1955 to 16 November 1956 he served as the mayor of Gaziantep. In 1961 elections after the 1960 coup d'état, he was an MP candidate from newly established Justice Party (AP). In 1962, he was chosen as AP's local district chair and served there until 1965. In 1963 local elections, he was elected as a member of Gaziantep city council. In 1965 elections, he was elected as AP Gaziantep deputy on 10 October 1965. Then he was appointed state minister responsible for sports on 27 October 1965 to the first cabinet of Prime Minister Süleyman Demirel. The cabinet was approved by the parliament on 11 November 1965. During his term, Ocak helped to build one stadium and one gymnasium in Gaziantep.

== Personal life ==
Ocak was married to Mübeccel Ocak and had four children, two sons and two daughters. He was fluent in English and French. He was the uncle of F. Tulga Ocak, professor of Turkish literature.

== Death ==
Ocak died of a heart attack in Ankara on 21 May 1969. He was buried in Gaziantep.

== Legacy ==
There are several sport facilities in Gaziantep with his name, including a stadium, a gymnasium and a sport complex.
