= 2001 Latvian Football Cup =

Football competition held in Latvia

The 2001 Latvian Football Cup was the 60th edition of the Latvian football knockout tournament contested between 7 April and 23 May 2001.

Skonto Riga successfully pursued its 2–0 title against Dinaburg Daugavpils, 2-0 in the final.

== Preliminary round ==
Team 1	Score	Team 2
April 7, 2001
Bauskas Rajona BJSS	0-3	JFC Skonto
FK Auda	5-0	FK Kvarcs/Madona
Akora	5-0	RFS Nacionale
Robezsardze	3-1	Fortuna Ogre
RAF Jelgava	7-1	Sakarnieks

== First round ==
Team 1	Score	Team 2
April 10, 2001
FK Balvu Vilki Mārupe	0-11	Skonto Riga
JFC Skonto	0-3	FK Rīga
FK Auda	0-2	FK Liepājas Metalurgs
Robezsardze	0-8	Dinaburg Daugavpils
FK Rēzekne	2-3	Stalkers/Zemessardze
Akora	0-3	PFK Daugava
FK Ventspils	3-0	SFK Varaviksne
RAF Jelgava	1-1 (a.e.t.); 3-5 (p.)	Valmieras FK

== Quarterfinals ==
Team 1	Score	Team 2
April 16, 2001
FK Liepājas Metalurgs	5-0	Stalkers/Zemessardze
Dinaburg Daugavpils	1-0	Valmieras FK
April 22, 2001
PFK Daugava	0-0 (a.e.t.); 3-5 (p.)	FK Ventspils
Skonto Riga	2-0	FK Rīga

== Semifinals ==
First legs were played on May 2, 2001; second legs were played on May 10, 2001.

Team 1	Agg.	Team 2	1st leg	2nd leg
FK Liepājas Metalurgs	2–5	Skonto Riga	1–1	1–4
FK Ventspils	2–3	Dinaburg Daugavpils	0–2	2–1

== Final ==
2001-05-23

Skonto Riga	2–0	Dinaburg Daugavpils
Miholaps 69'; Zakreševskis 82'
