= Tom Sanne =

Norwegian footballer (born 1975)

Tom Sanne (born 26 June 1975) is a Norwegian former professional footballer who played as a midfielder.

He played most of his career in Viking, where he won the Norwegian Football Cup in 2001, and Norwegian Premier League bronze medal in 2000 and 2001. Sanne played a total of 131 games and score 12 goals in the Norwegian Premier League with Viking. He transferred to SK Brann in June 2004, and once again won the Norwegian Football Cup, and a bronze medal in the league that season. After the 2005 season he retired to pursue his career outside football.
