= Ferdinand Chi Fon =

Cameroonian footballer

Personal information
- Full name: Ferdinand Chi Fon
- Date of birth: 20 July 1976 (age 50)
- Place of birth: Bamenda, Cameroon
- Height: 1.75 m (5 ft 9 in)
- Position: Striker

Senior career*
Years	Team	Apps	(Gls)
1997	PWD Bamenda		
1997–1998	Varta Namysłów	21	(0)
1998	Avia Świdnik		
1999	Odra Opole		
1999–2001	Pogoń Szczecin	41	(4)
2001–2002	Union Berlin	15	(1)
2002	Pogoń Szczecin	14	(1)
2003	GKS Katowice	1	(1)
2003	Zorza Dobrzany		
2004	Szczakowianka Jaworzno	11	(0)
2005	Znicz Pruszków		
2005–2006	GKS Bełchatów	14	(0)
2007	Górnik Łęczna	14	(2)
2007	Znicz Pruszków	3	(0)
2008–2009	Pogoń Szczecin		
2009–2012	Flota Świnoujście	51	(2)
2012–2014	Flota Świnoujście II		
2015	Insel Usedom		
2016	Gryf Kamień Pomorski		

Managerial career
- 2012–2014: Flota Świnoujście (assistant)
- 2012–2014: Flota Świnoujście II (player-manager)
- 2016: Gryf Kamień Pomorski (player-manager)
- * Club domestic league appearances and goals

Ferdinand Chi Fon (born 20 July 1976) is a Cameroonian professional football manager and former player who played as a striker.
