= Rafał Niżnik =

Polish footballer (born 1974)

Personal information
- Full name: Rafał Niżnik
- Date of birth: 11 December 1974 (age 51)
- Place of birth: Żary, Poland
- Height: 1.72 m (5 ft 7 1/2 in)
- Position: Midfielder

Youth career
- –1991: Szarotka Uherce

Senior career*
Years	Team	Apps	(Gls)
1991–1994	Igloopol Dębica		
1994–1995	Okocimski KS Brzesko		
1995–1998	ŁKS Łódź	105	(14)
1999–2003	Brøndby	32	(3)
2000–2001	→ Brønshøj BK (loan)	31	(4)
2003	→ BK Frem (loan)	14	(5)
2003–2004	Górnik Zabrze	15	(1)
2004–2006	ŁKS Łódź	68	(21)
2007–2010	Górnik Łęczna	112	(31)
2011–2013	Motor Lublin	50	(4)
2013	Iskra Piotrowice		
2013	KS Lublin		
2014	Orion Niedrzwica Duża		
2014	KS Lublin		
2014–2020	Szarotka Uherce		
- * Club domestic league appearances and goals

Rafał Niżnik (born 11 December 1974) is a Polish former professional footballer who played as a midfielder.

== Career ==
=== Club ===
In January 2011, he joined Motor Lublin on a half year deal. From August 2014 until the 2020–21 autumn round of the season, he was a player for his parent club, Szarotka Uherce, of the District League.

== Honours ==
ŁKS Łódź

- Ekstraklasa: 1997–98

Brøndby

- Danish Superliga: 2001–02
- Danish Cup: 2002–03

Górnik Łęczna

- III liga, group IV: 2007–08

Szarotka Uherce

- Klasa A Krosno I: 2019–20
