= Kamil Ocak Stadium =

Football stadium in Gaziantep, Turkey

Coordinates: 37°04′03.26″N 37°22′39.33″E

- Interactive map of Kamil Ocak Stadium
- Location: Gaziantep, Turkey
- Owner: Gaziantepspor
- Capacity: 16,981
- Surface: Grass

Construction
- Opened: 1974
- Closed: February 2018
- Demolished: 2018

Kamil Ocak Stadium (Turkish: Kamil Ocak Stadyumu) was a multi-purpose stadium in Gaziantep, Turkey. It was used mostly for football matches and was the home ground of Gaziantepspor until 2017. The stadium hold 16,981 people. It was named after the Turkish politician Mehmet Kamil Ocak.
