= Milan Osterc =

Slovenian footballer (born 1975)

Personal information
- Date of birth: 4 July 1975 (age 51)
- Place of birth: Murska Sobota, SFR Yugoslavia
- Height: 1.85 m (6 ft 1 in)
- Position: Forward

Youth career
- Veržej

Senior career*
| Years | Team | Apps | (Gls) |
| –1994 | Veržej | | |
| 1994–1996 | Beltinci | 50 | (16) |
| 1996–1998 | Gorica | 64 | (19) |
| 1998–1999 | Hércules Alicante | 23 | (3) |
| 2000 | Olimpija | 16 | (6) |
| 2000–2002 | Hapoel Tel Aviv | 53 | (10) |
| 2002–2003 | Le Havre | 8 | (0) |
| 2003–2004 | Bursaspor | 15 | (1) |
| 2004–2005 | Malatyaspor | 26 | (10) |
| 2005 | AEK Larnaca | 7 | (1) |
| 2006 | LASK | 11 | (2) |
| 2007–2010 | Gorica | 91 | (43) |
| 2010–2012 | Koper | 55 | (22) |
| Total | | 419 | (133) |

International career
| 1994–1997 | Slovenia U21 | 8 | (1) |
| 1997–2002 | Slovenia | 44 | (8) |
- * Club domestic league appearances and goals

Milan Osterc (pronounced [ˈmíːlan ˈòːstərts]; born 4 July 1975) is a Slovenian former professional footballer who played as a forward.

== Club career ==
Osterc started his career at Veržej, where he was the top goalscorer of the 1993–94 Slovenian Second League season. In the 2001–02 UEFA Cup, he reached the quarter-finals of the competition with Hapoel Tel Aviv, scoring seven goals in the process. In the 2009–10 season, he was the top scorer of the Slovenian first division, 1. SNL, with 23 goals.

== International career ==
Osterc played 44 matches for Slovenia, scoring 8 goals. He was a participant at Euro 2000 and the 2002 FIFA World Cup. On 10 November 2001, he scored a goal against Romania in the 2002 FIFA World Cup qualifying play-offs, helping to secure his country's first-ever World Cup appearance as an independent country. His final international match was at that World Cup, in a 3–1 group stage defeat against Paraguay.

== Career statistics ==
=== International ===
Scores and results list Slovenia's goal tally first, score column indicates score after each Osterc goal.

List of international goals scored by Milan Osterc
| No. | Date | Venue | Opponent | Score | Result | Competition |
|---|---|---|---|---|---|---|
| 1 | 8 February 1999 | Sultan Qaboos Sports Complex, Muscat, Oman | Oman | 1–0 | 7–0 | Friendly |
| 2 | 8 February 1999 | Sultan Qaboos Sports Complex, Muscat, Oman | Oman | 3–0 | 7–0 | Friendly |
| 3 | 8 February 1999 | Sultan Qaboos Sports Complex, Muscat, Oman | Oman | 4–0 | 7–0 | Friendly |
| 4 | 8 February 1999 | Sultan Qaboos Sports Complex, Muscat, Oman | Oman | 6–0 | 7–0 | Friendly |
| 5 | 18 August 1999 | Bežigrad Stadium, Ljubljana, Slovenia | Albania | 2–0 | 2–0 | UEFA Euro 2000 qualification |
| 6 | 3 September 2000 | Svangaskarð, Toftir, Faroe Islands | Faroe Islands | 2–0 | 2–2 | FIFA World Cup 2002 qualification |
| 7 | 1 September 2001 | Bežigrad Stadium, Ljubljana, Slovenia | Russia | 1–0 | 2–1 | FIFA World Cup 2002 qualification |
| 8 | 10 November 2001 | Bežigrad Stadium, Ljubljana, Slovenia | Romania | 2–1 | 2–1 | FIFA World Cup 2002 qualification |

== Honours ==
Olimpija

- Slovenian Cup: 1999–2000

Hapoel Tel Aviv

- Toto Cup: 2001–02
