= Nihat Kahveci =

Turkish footballer (born 1979)

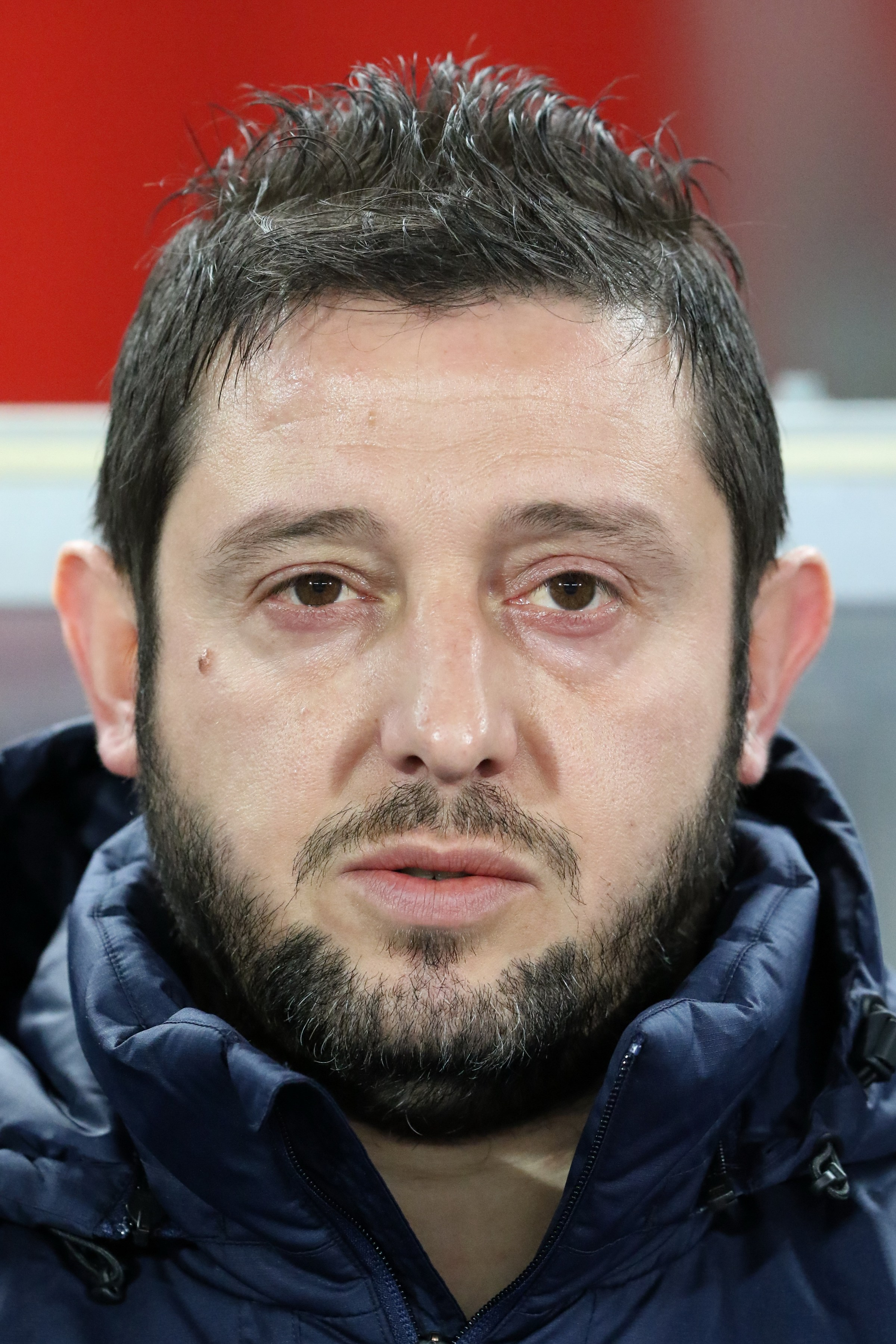
- Nihat in 2016

Personal information
- Date of birth: 23 November 1979 (age 46)
- Place of birth: Istanbul, Turkey
- Height: 1.75 m (5 ft 9 in)
- Positions: Winger; forward

Youth career
- 1994–1996: Esenler
- 1996–1997: Beşiktaş

Senior career*
Years	Team	Apps	(Gls)
1997–2002	Beşiktaş	114	(27)
2002–2006	Real Sociedad	133	(58)
2006–2009	Villarreal	62	(18)
2009–2011	Beşiktaş	34	(3)
Total		343	(106)

International career
2000–2010	Turkey	69	(19)

Managerial career
- 2012–2013: Villarreal (youth)
- 2013–2017: Turkey (assistant)
Medal record
Representing Turkey
Bronze medal – third place	FIFA World Cup	2002 Korea-Japan
Bronze medal – third place	FIFA Confederations Cup	2003 France
Bronze medal – third place	UEFA Euro	2008 Switzerland-Austria
- * Club domestic league appearances and goals

Nihat Kahveci (born 23 November 1979), better known mononymously as Nihat, is a Turkish former professional footballer who played as a forward and right winger for Beşiktaş, Real Sociedad and Villarreal. He works as a football commentator for TRT. He has a UEFA Pro Licence.

== Biography ==
Like most Turkish players, his shirt carries his first name, Nihat, rather than his family name, Kahveci. He married Pınar Kaşgören on 5 July 2003. Their daughter Selin was born in May 2008.

== Club career ==
=== Beşiktaş ===
Nihat is a product of Beşiktaş's youth system and was discovered by Hürser Mustafa Cindir when Nihat played in Beşiktaş in the 1996–97 season. He joined the first team at Beşiktaş in the 1997–98 season when he was just 17, at the time John Toshack was the coach. Since then, Nihat became a key player.

=== Real Sociedad ===
In January 2002, Nihat was transferred to Real Sociedad for €5 million by his former Beşiktaş coach Toshack. Nihat also joined his Turkish team-mate Tayfun Korkut in Spain.

He had his debut on January, 26 in a 3–1 loss against Celta de Vigo, coming on as a substitute in the 72nd minute for Xabi Alonso and played for 18 minutes.

His first goal came in a 2–2 draw against Rayo Vallecano on 24 February 2002. In the first half of the season, Nihat played 11 matches and scored one goal.

In 2002–03, his second season in Spain, Nihat scored a brace in the Basque derby, the opening match of the season, helping his team to win 4–2. He finished the season with 23 goals making him the league's joint-second highest scorer for the season behind Roy Makaay (29 goals) and tied with Ronaldo. That season, Real Sociedad finished second in the league that season, just two points behind Real Madrid, mostly thanks to a very fruitful strike partnership with Serbian forward Darko Kovačević, such that sports journalist Phil Ball nicknamed the pair "Little and Large", in reference to the height difference between the two (Nihat's height is 1.75 m and Kovačević's is 1.87 m). His consistent, good performances have led to interests from other clubs, to which Nihat turned a deaf ear.

In his third season at Real Sociedad, Nihat made 32 appearances scoring a total of 14 goals. Nihat also played in the UEFA Champions League with Real Sociedad as the club was paired with Juventus, Galatasaray and Olympiacos. La Real qualified to the knockout stage, but was eliminated by Olympique Lyonnais, losing 2–0 on aggregate. By the end of the season, Nihat won the Don Balón Award for Best Foreign Player.

In his fourth season, Nihat made 23 appearances and scored 13 goals. In the middle of the season, Nihat tore his ACL during a match against Sevilla which caused him to be out of action for six months.

In June 2005, reports claimed that Nihat was linked to Russian club CSKA Moscow for €20 million Euros but the move never materialized. Nihat insisted he had to concentrate on the club to prevent relegation: "I can't go now. I can't walk out on Real Sociedad, We are fighting to try and secure some tranquillity and I am one of those who thinks that the more strength there is in the team, the better. On Sunday we took a very important step in Santander, and now it is a question of continuing to take steps forward in the league.". Nihat was also linked with clubs like Chelsea and Manchester United.

In his fifth and last season at Real Sociedad, Nihat made his return from injury in a 3–0 loss in the Basque derby, against Athletic Bilbao. He went on to make 32 appearances and score seven goals. During that season, Nihat was about to sign for Russian club Spartak Moscow but had to stay for the remainder of the season due to Kovačević's injury.

=== Villarreal ===
On 16 May 2006, Nihat agreed to join Villarreal CF, on a five-year contract, on a Bosman transfer after rejecting a new contract at Real Sociedad. He tore his ACL again on 22 November 2006 during a training ground collision with team-mate Javi Venta and was out for months. He seemed to catch up form in his second season with 18 goals in the league and four goals in the UEFA Cup, helping his club to finish the season as second in La Liga where he formed a formidable offensive pair with Robert Pires. The Spanish newspaper El Mundo named Nihat as the best player on the team. However, in the 2008–09 season, due to injuries again, Nihat made 19 appearances equalling 764 minutes of playing time but failed to score a single goal.

=== Return to Beşiktaş ===
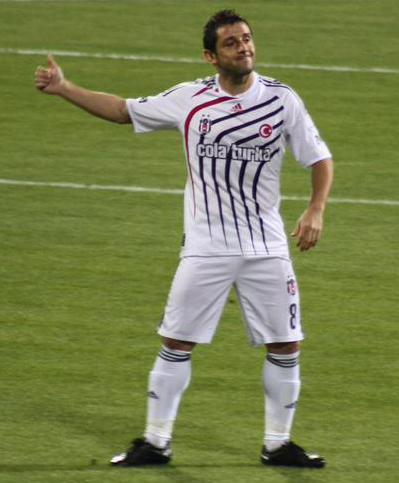
Nihat playing for Beşiktaş in 2010

On 27 June 2009, Nihat returned to the club where he started his career by signing for Beşiktaş J.K. on a four-year deal. Return to Turkish football wasn't very fruitful for Nihat. Over two seasons he managed 34 appearances in the league, netting only three goals. On 25 April 2011, in a match against Konyaspor which turned out to be his last game, Nihat and the new Beşiktaş favourite Ricardo Quaresma had quarrel on the pitch. Nihat was upset at Quaresma for failing to pass the ball and the altercation was broken up by teammates. On 18 May 2011, Beşiktaş terminated Nihat's contract despite two years left on his contract and he told Turkish media: "I don't want to play in Turkey anymore.".

== Retirement ==
Following his release by Beşiktaş, Nihat was linked with returning to Spanish clubs like his former club Real Sociedad and Castellón and as well as MLS side Los Angeles Galaxy.

After a six months without a club, on 12 January 2012; Nihat announced his retirement from football with immediate effect, saying: "I would like to share my decision to put an end to my professional career as a footballer,". After some days, Nihat told NTV Spor that his retirement was prompted by his age limiting his ability on the pitch and admitted that returning to Beşiktaş was a mistake and ill-judged, although stated there were some beautiful moments.

"When you get old, you can't do anything you want on the pitch, I must admit my return to Turkey was not a success and it hurt me as a man who was used to success. I was angry at myself, and there was some heavy criticism too. After I left Beşiktaş, I thought maybe I could play somewhere else, but I saw that I wanted to call it a day. Every good story has a beginning and an end. I have had some very beautiful moments. I had great joy when I was healthy and playing well."

— Nihat told NTV Spor about his retirement

== International career ==
=== 2002 World Cup ===
Nihat made his international debut against Sweden in October 2000. In Group C at the 2002 FIFA World Cup, Nihat made his only appearance as a 79th-minute substitute for Yıldıray Baştürk against Costa Rica. His only other appearance was as a substitute in the 1–0 victory over Japan where he replaced, the goalscorer, Ümit Davala. Turkey went on to finish in third place with a 3–2 victory over Guus Hiddink's South Korea.

=== Euro 2008 ===
In the final match of Euro 2008 Group A, Nihat scored twice in a pivotal match against the Czech Republic. Both teams were level on points, both having beaten Switzerland and lost to Portugal, with exactly the same number of goals scored and conceded, a win would guarantee a quarter-finals spot whilst a draw would mean penalty-shootouts would be required in the group stage. The Czechs took a 2–0 lead through a Jan Koller header and a Jaroslav Plašil goal and the score remained 2–0 until the 75th minute, when Arda Turan scored making it 2–1. Nihat's first goal came in the 87th minute; Hamit Altıntop's cross was dropped by Petr Čech allowing Nihat tap the ball into the net. He scored his second goal one minute later; a brilliant, curling strike from outside the box, helping Turkey win the match 3–2.

Nihat was ruled out of Turkey's semi-final with Germany due to a thigh injury, which ultimately required surgery and prevented him from playing for Villarreal in the early part of the 2008–09 season.

== Coaching career ==
On 6 July 2012, it was reported that Nihat has joined the coaching staff at his former club Villarreal as an assistant-manager of the youth team.

"Villarreal CF has opened the doors and I have always felt at home, I played three seasons here and in recent times I have followed the team as an amateur. I have much affection and, therefore, I am very glad to be in this club. I want to start my new career coaching from below, like I did as a player, The president Fernando Roig has made history at this club and certainly have the ability to return to the elite as soon as possible. We must also rely on the new coach, Julio Velasquez, if the club has chosen it is because they will have the conviction that the team will return to First Division."

— Nihat on his new job.

== Career statistics ==
=== Club ===
Appearances and goals by club, season and competition
Club	Season	League			National cup (Note: Includes Turkish Cup, Copa del Rey)		Europe		Other		Total	
Club	Season	Division	Apps	Goals	Apps	Goals	Apps	Goals	Apps	Goals	Apps	Goals
Beşiktaş	1997–98	1.Lig	11	2	0	0	0	0	–		11	2
Beşiktaş	1998–99	1.Lig	28	7	0	0	0	0	1 (Note: Appearance in Turkish Super Cup)	1	29	8
Beşiktaş	1999–2000	1.Lig	32	7	0	0	0	0	–		32	7
Beşiktaş	2000–01	1.Lig	32	5	2	0	0	0	–		34	5
Beşiktaş	2001–02	Süper Lig	15	6	4	1	2	2	–		21	9
Beşiktaş	Total		114	27	6	1	2	2	1	1	123	31
Real Sociedad	2001–02	La Liga	11	1	4	1	–		–		15	2
Real Sociedad	2002–03	La Liga	35	23	0	0	–		–		35	23
Real Sociedad	2003–04	La Liga	32	14	0	0	8 (Note: Appearances in UEFA Champions League)	0	–		40	14
Real Sociedad	2004–05	La Liga	23	13	0	0	–		–		23	13
Real Sociedad	2005–06	La Liga	32	7	0	0	–		–		32	7
Real Sociedad	Total		133	58	4	1	8	0	–		145	59
Villarreal	2006–07	La Liga	9	0	2	3	2 (Note: Appearances in UEFA Intertoto Cup)	1	–		13	4
Villarreal	2007–08	La Liga	34	18	2	0	6 (Note: Appearances in UEFA Cup)	3	–		42	21
Villarreal	2008–09	La Liga	19	0	0	0	4	0	–		23	0
Villarreal	Total		62	18	4	3	12	4	–		78	25
Beşiktaş	2009–10	Süper Lig	23	3	3	2	0	0	1	0	27	5
Beşiktaş	2010–11	Süper Lig	11	0	2	0	6 (Note: Appearances in UEFA Europa League)	4	–		19	4
Beşiktaş	Total		34	3	5	2	6	4	1	0	46	9
Career total			343	106	19	7	28	10	2	1	382	124

=== International ===
Scores and results list Turkey goal tally first, score column indicates score after each Nihat goal.

List of international goals scored by Nihat Kahveci
No.	Date	Venue	Opponent	Score	Result	Competition
1	6 October 2001	Stadionul Republican, Chişinău, Moldova	Moldova	2–0	3–0	2002 FIFA World Cup qualification
2	21 August 2002	Hüseyin Avni Aker Stadium, Trabzon, Turkey	Georgia	3–0	3–0	Friendly
3	12 October 2002	Gradski Stadium, Skopje, Republic of Macedonia	Macedonia	2–1	2–1	UEFA Euro 2004 qualifying
4	7 June 2003	Tehelné pole, Bratislava, Slovakia	Slovakia	1–0	1–0	UEFA Euro 2004 qualifying
5	11 June 2003	BJK İnönü Stadium, Istanbul, Turkey	(North Macedonia) Macedonia	1–1	3–2	UEFA Euro 2004 qualifying
6	20 August 2003	Ankara 19 Mayıs Stadium, Ankara, Turkey	Moldova	1–0	2–0	Friendly
7	24 May 2004	Telstra Dome, Melbourne, Australia	Australia	1–0	1–0	Friendly
8	9 October 2004	Şükrü Saracoğlu Stadium, Istanbul, Turkey	Kazakhstan	2–0	4–0	2006 FIFA World Cup qualification
9	13 October 2004	Parken Stadium, Copenhagen, Denmark	Denmark	1–1	1–1	2006 FIFA World Cup qualification
10	26 May 2006	Ruhrstadion, Bochum, Germany	Ghana	1–0	1–1	Friendly
11	2 June 2006	Trendwork Arena, Sittard, Netherlands	Angola	2–1	3–2	Friendly
12	6 September 2006	Commerzbank-Arena, Frankfurt, Germany	Malta	1–0	2–0	UEFA Euro 2008 qualifying
13	17 November 2007	Ullevaal Stadion, Oslo, Norway	Norway	2–1	2–1	UEFA Euro 2008 qualifying
14	21 November 2007	Ali Sami Yen Stadium, Istanbul, Turkey	Bosnia and Herzegovina	1–0	1–0	UEFA Euro 2008 qualifying
15	25 May 2008	Ruhrstadion, Bochum, Germany	Uruguay	2–1	2–3	Friendly
16	15 June 2008	Stade de Genève, Geneva, Switzerland	Czech Republic	2–2	3–2	Euro 2008
17	15 June 2008	Stade de Genève, Geneva, Switzerland	Czech Republic	3–2	3–2	Euro 2008
18	22 May 2010	Red Bull Arena, New Jersey, United States	Czech Republic	2–0	2–1	Friendly
19	3 September 2010	Astana Arena, Astana, Kazakhstan	Kazakhstan	3–0	3–0	UEFA Euro 2012 qualifying

== Honours ==
Beşiktaş

- Turkish Cup: 1997–98, 2010–11
- Turkish Super Cup: 1998

Turkey

- FIFA World Cup: third place: 2002
- FIFA Confederations Cup: third place 2003
- UEFA European Championship: semi-finals 2008

Individual

- Milliyet Sports Awards Footballer Of The Year: 2002
- La Liga Best Foreign Player: 2002–03
- Beşiktaş J.K. Squads of Century (Silver Team)

Order

- Turkish State Medal of Distinguished Service
