= 2007–08 Villarreal CF season =

Villarreal
2007–08 season
- President: Fernando Roig
- Head coach: Manuel Pellegrini
- Stadium: El Madrigal
- La Liga: 2nd
- Copa del Rey: Quarter-finals
- UEFA Cup: Round of 32
- Top goalscorer: League: Nihat Kahveci (18); All: Nihat Kahveci (21)
| Home colours | Away colours |

The 2007–08 season was Villarreal Club de Fútbol's 85th season in existence and the club's 8th consecutive season in the top flight of Spanish football. In addition to the domestic league, Villarreal participated in this season's edition of the Copa del Rey and the UEFA Cup. The season covered the period from 1 July 2007 to 30 June 2008.

== Season summary ==
Villarreal enjoyed the best season in their history, finishing as runners-up.

== Players ==
=== First-team squad ===
Squad at end of season

Note: Flags indicate national team as defined under FIFA eligibility rules; some limited exceptions apply. Players may hold more than one non-FIFA nationality.

| No. | Pos. | Nation | Player |
|---|---|---|---|
| 1 | GK | URU | Sebastián Viera |
| 2 | DF | ARG | Gonzalo Rodríguez |
| 3 | DF | ESP | Josemi |
| 4 | DF | URU | Diego Godín |
| 5 | DF | ESP | Joan Capdevila |
| 6 | MF | ESP | Josico |
| 7 | MF | FRA | Robert Pires |
| 8 | MF | ESP | Santi Cazorla |
| 9 | FW | MEX | Guillermo Franco (Note: Franco was born in Corrientes, Argentina, but became a naturalised Mexican citizen in 2004 and made his international debut for Mexico in 2005.) |
| 10 | MF | ESP | Cani |
| 11 | FW | DEN | Jon Dahl Tomasson |
| 12 | DF | FRA | Pascal Cygan |
| 13 | GK | ESP | Diego López |
| 14 | MF | CHI | Matías Fernández (Note: Fernández was born in Buenos Aires, Argentina, but was raised in Chile from the age of four and made his international debut for Chile in 2005.) |

| No. | Pos. | Nation | Player |
|---|---|---|---|
| 15 | FW | TUR | Nihat Kahveci |
| 17 | DF | ESP | Javi Venta |
| 18 | MF | ESP | Ángel |
| 19 | MF | ESP | Marcos Senna (Note: Senna was born in São Paulo, Brazil, but obtained Spanish citizenship in 2006 and made his international debut for Spain in March 2006.) |
| 20 | DF | ARG | Fabricio Fuentes |
| 21 | MF | ESP | Bruno |
| 22 | FW | ITA | Giuseppe Rossi (Note: Rossi was born in Teaneck, New Jersey, United States, but was raised in Italy from the age of 12 and would make his international debut for Italy in October 2008.) |
| 23 | MF | URU | Sebastián Eguren (on loan from Hammarby) |
| 26 | GK | ESP | Juan Carlos |
| 27 | DF | ESP | Alberto de la Bella |
| 28 | DF | ESP | Kiko |
| 38 | DF | ESP | Rocha |
| 44 | MF | POR | Feliciano Condesso |
| 45 | FW | ESP | Rubén |

=== Left club during season ===
Note: Flags indicate national team as defined under FIFA eligibility rules; some limited exceptions apply. Players may hold more than one non-FIFA nationality.

| No. | Pos. | Nation | Player |
|---|---|---|---|
| 16 | MF | ARG | Juan Román Riquelme (to Boca Juniors) |
| 23 | FW | ESP | José Mari (to Real Betis) |

| No. | Pos. | Nation | Player |
|---|---|---|---|
| 24 | MF | FRA | Rio Mavuba (Note: Mavuba was born in international waters; his father was Congolese and his mother was Angolan, but Mavuba was raised in France.) (on loan to Lille) |
| 30 | FW | ESP | Xisco Nadal (to Granada) |

== Competitions ==
=== Overall record ===
| Competition | First match | Last match | Starting round | Final position | Record | | | | | | | |
| Competition | First match | Last match | Starting round | Final position | Pld | W | D | L | GF | GA | GD | Win % |
|---|---|---|---|---|---|---|---|---|---|---|---|---|
| La Liga | 31 August 2007 | 30 May 2008 | Matchday 1 | 2nd | 38 | 24 | 5 | 9 | 63 | 40 | +23 | 63.16 |
| Copa del Rey | 29 October 2007 | 12 November 2008 | Round of 32 | Quarter-finals | 6 | 3 | 1 | 2 | 8 | 5 | +3 | 50.00 |
| UEFA Cup | 17 September 2007 | 15 April 2008 | First round | Round of 32 | 8 | 6 | 1 | 1 | 15 | 6 | +9 | 75.00 |
| Total | | | | | 52 | 33 | 7 | 12 | 86 | 51 | +35 | 63.46 |

Source: Competitions

=== La Liga ===
==== League table ====
| Pos | Team | Pld | W | D | L | GF | GA | GD | Pts | Qualification or relegation |
|---|---|---|---|---|---|---|---|---|---|---|
| 1 | Real Madrid (C) | 38 | 27 | 4 | 7 | 84 | 36 | +48 | 85 | Qualification for the Champions League group stage |
| 2 | Villarreal | 38 | 24 | 5 | 9 | 63 | 40 | +23 | 77 | Qualification for the Champions League group stage |
| 3 | Barcelona | 38 | 19 | 10 | 9 | 76 | 43 | +33 | 67 | Qualification for the Champions League third qualifying round |
| 4 | Atlético Madrid | 38 | 19 | 7 | 12 | 66 | 47 | +19 | 64 (Note: ATM 4–3 SEV; SEV 1–2 ATM) | Qualification for the Champions League third qualifying round |
| 5 | Sevilla | 38 | 20 | 4 | 14 | 75 | 49 | +26 | 64 | Qualification for the UEFA Cup first round |

Source: LFP
Rules for classification: 1st points; 2nd head-to-head points; 3rd head-to-head goal difference; 4th head-to-head goals scored; 5th goal difference; 6th number of goals scored; 7th Fair-play points
(C) Champions

==== Results summary ====
| Overall | | | | | | | | Home | | | | | | Away | | | | | |
| Pld | W | D | L | GF | GA | GD | Pts | W | D | L | GF | GA | GD | W | D | L | GF | GA | GD |
|---|---|---|---|---|---|---|---|---|---|---|---|---|---|---|---|---|---|---|---|
| 38 | 24 | 5 | 9 | 63 | 40 | +23 | 77 | 12 | 5 | 2 | 33 | 15 | +18 | 12 | 0 | 7 | 30 | 25 | +5 |

Source: La Liga

==== Results by round ====
| Round | 1 | 2 | 3 | 4 | 5 | 6 | 7 | 8 | 9 | 10 | 11 | 12 | 13 | 14 | 15 | 16 | 17 | 18 | 19 | 20 | 21 | 22 | 23 | 24 | 25 | 26 | 27 | 28 | 29 | 30 | 31 | 32 | 33 | 34 | 35 | 36 | 37 | 38 |
|---|---|---|---|---|---|---|---|---|---|---|---|---|---|---|---|---|---|---|---|---|---|---|---|---|---|---|---|---|---|---|---|---|---|---|---|---|---|---|
| Ground | A | H | A | H | A | H | A | H | A | H | A | H | H | A | H | A | H | A | H | H | A | H | A | H | A | H | A | H | A | H | A | A | H | A | H | A | H | A |
| Result | W | L | W | W | W | W | L | W | L | W | W | W | D | L | L | W | D | L | W | W | L | D | W | D | W | D | W | W | W | W | L | L | W | W | W | W | W | W |
| Position | 4 | 8 | 3 | 2 | 2 | 2 | 3 | 2 | 3 | 3 | 3 | 2 | 2 | 3 | 4 | 4 | 4 | 5 | 5 | 3 | 3 | 4 | 3 | 3 | 3 | 3 | 3 | 3 | 3 | 2 | 3 | 3 | 2 | 2 | 2 | 2 | 2 | 2 |

Source: La Liga
A = Away; H = Home; W = Win; D = Draw; L = Loss

==== Matches ====
| 26 August 2007 1 | Valencia | 0–3 | Villarreal | Valencia |
| | | | | Stadium: Mestalla |

| 2 September 2007 2 | Villarreal | 0–5 | Real Madrid | Villarreal |
| | | | | Stadium: El Madrigal |

| 16 September 2007 3 | Mallorca | 0–1 | Villarreal | Palma |
| | | | | Stadium: Ono Estadi |

| 23 September 2007 4 | Villarreal | 2–0 | Murcia | Villarreal |
| | | | | Stadium: El Madrigal |

| 26 September 2007 5 | Racing Santander | 0–2 | Villarreal | Santander |
| | | | | Stadium: El Sardinero |

| 30 September 2007 6 | Villarreal | 1–0 | Athletic Bilbao | Villarreal |
| | | | | Stadium: El Madrigal |

| 7 October 2007 7 | Osasuna | 3–2 | Villarreal | Pamplona |
| | | | | Stadium: El Sadar |

| 20 October 2007 8 | Villarreal | 3–1 | Barcelona | Villarreal |
| | | | | Stadium: El Madrigal |

| 28 October 2007 9 | Zaragoza | 4–1 | Villarreal | Zaragoza |
| | | | | Stadium: La Romareda |

| 31 October 2007 10 | Villarreal | 3–0 | Levante | Villarreal |
| | | | | Stadium: El Madrigal |

| 4 November 2007 11 | Atlético Madrid | 3–4 | Villarreal | Madrid |
| | | | | Stadium: Vicente Calderón |

| 11 November 2007 12 | Villarreal | 3–2 | Sevilla | Villarreal |
| | | | | Stadium: El Madrigal |

| 25 November 2007 13 | Villarreal | 1–1 | Almería | Villarreal |
| | | | | Stadium: El Madrigal |

| 2 December 2007 14 | Valladolid | 2–0 | Villarreal | Valladolid |
| | | | | Stadium: José Zorrilla |

| 9 December 2007 15 | Villarreal | 0–1 | Real Betis | Villarreal |
| | | | | Stadium: El Madrigal |

| 16 December 2007 16 | Getafe | 1–3 | Villarreal | Getafe |
| | | | | Stadium: Coliseum Alfonso Pérez |

| 23 December 2007 17 | Villarreal | 1–1 | Recreativo | Villarreal |
| | | | | Stadium: El Madrigal |

| 5 January 2008 18 | Espanyol | 3–0 | Villarreal | Barcelona |
| | | | | Stadium: Olímpic Lluís Companys |

| 13 January 2008 19 | Villarreal | 4–3 | Deportivo La Coruña | Villarreal |
| | | | | Stadium: El Madrigal |

| 19 January 2008 20 | Villarreal | 3–0 | Valencia | Villarreal |
| | | | | Stadium: El Madrigal |

| 27 January 2008 21 | Real Madrid | 3–2 | Villarreal | Madrid |
| | | | | Stadium: Santiago Bernabéu |

| 3 February 2008 22 | Villarreal | 1–1 | Mallorca | Villarreal |
| | | | | Stadium: El Madrigal |

| 9 February 2008 23 | Murcia | 0–1 | Villarreal | Murcia |
| | | | | Stadium: Nueva Condomina |

| 17 February 2008 24 | Villarreal | 0–0 | Racing Santander | Villarreal |
| | | | | Stadium: El Madrigal |

| 24 February 2008 25 | Athletic Bilbao | 1–2 | Villarreal | Bilbao |
| | | | | Stadium: San Mamés |

| 2 March 2008 26 | Villarreal | 0–0 | Osasuna | Villarreal |
| | | | | Stadium: El Madrigal |

| 9 March 2008 27 | Barcelona | 1–2 | Villarreal | Barcelona |
| | | | | Stadium: Camp Nou |

| 16 March 2008 28 | Villarreal | 2–0 | Zaragoza | Villarreal |
| | | | | Stadium: El Madrigal |

| 23 March 2008 29 | Levante | 1–2 | Villarreal | Valencia |
| | | | | Stadium: Ciutat de València |

| 29 March 2008 30 | Villarreal | 3–0 | Atlético Madrid | Villarreal |
| | | | | Stadium: El Madrigal |

| 6 April 2008 31 | Sevilla | 2–0 | Villarreal | Seville |
| | | | | Stadium: Ramón Sánchez Pizjuán |

| 13 April 2008 32 | Almería | 1–0 | Villarreal | Almería |
| | | | | Stadium: Juegos Mediterráneos |

| 20 April 2008 33 | Villarreal | 2–0 | Valladolid | Villarreal |
| | | | | Stadium: El Madrigal |

| 27 April 2008 34 | Real Betis | 0–1 | Villarreal | Seville |
| | | | | Stadium: Manuel Ruiz de Lopera |

| 4 May 2008 35 | Villarreal | 2–0 | Getafe | Villarreal |
| | | | | Stadium: El Madrigal |

| 7 May 2008 36 | Recreativo | 0–2 | Villarreal | Huelva |
| | | | | Stadium: Nuevo Colombino |

| 11 May 2008 37 | Villarreal | 2–0 | Espanyol | Villarreal |
| | | | | Stadium: El Madrigal |

| 18 May 2008 38 | Deportivo La Coruña | 0–2 | Villarreal | A Coruña |
| | | | | Stadium: Riazor |

=== Copa del Rey ===
==== Round of 32 ====
| 14 November 2007 First leg | Las Palmas | 2–4 | Villarreal | Las Palmas |
| | | | | Stadium: Gran Canaria |

| 2 January 2008 Second leg | Villarreal | 2–1 (6–3 agg.) | Las Palmas | Villarreal |
| | | | | Stadium: El Madrigal |

==== Round of 16 ====
| 9 January 2008 First leg | Recreativo | 1–0 | Villarreal | Huelva |
| 20:00 CET (UTC+1) | Cáceres 2' | Report | | Stadium: Nuevo Colombino; Attendance: 6,000; Referee: Javier Turienzo Álvarez |

| 16 January 2008 Second leg | Villarreal | 2–0 (a.e.t.) (2–1 agg.) | Recreativo | Villarreal |
| 20:00 CET (UTC+1) | Senna 10'; Rossi 102' | Report | | Stadium: El Madrigal; Attendance: 13,000; Referee: Alberto Undiano Mallenco |

==== Quarter-finals ====
| 24 January 2008 First leg | Villarreal | 0–0 | Barcelona | Villarreal |
| 22:00 CET (UTC+1) | | Report | | Stadium: El Madrigal; Attendance: 21,000; Referee: Miguel Ángel Pérez Lasa |

| 31 January 2008 Second leg | Barcelona | 1–0 (1–0 agg.) | Villarreal | Barcelona |
| 22:00 CET (UTC+1) | Henry 41' | Report | | Stadium: Camp Nou; Attendance: 78,000; Referee: Manuel Mejuto González |

=== UEFA Cup ===
==== First round ====
| 20 September 2007 First leg | Villarreal (Spain) | 4–1 | (Belarus) BATE Borisov | Villarreal, Spain |
| | Nihat 6', 50'; Senna 18'; Tomasson 54' | | Zhavnerchik 70' | Stadium: El Madrigal; Attendance: 15,000; Referee: Hervé Piccirillo (France) |

| 4 October 2007 Second leg | BATE Borisov (Belarus) | 0–2 (1–6 agg.) | (Spain) Villarreal | Minsk, Belarus |
| | | | Cani 24'; Ángel 78' | Stadium: Dinamo Stadium; Attendance: 5,500; Referee: Brade Sandmoen (Norway) |

==== Group stage ====
| Pos | Team | Pld | W | D | L | GF | GA | GD | Pts | Qualification |
|---|---|---|---|---|---|---|---|---|---|---|
| 1 | (Spain) Villarreal | 4 | 3 | 1 | 0 | 7 | 3 | +4 | 10 | Advance to knockout stage |
| 2 | (Italy) Fiorentina | 4 | 2 | 2 | 0 | 10 | 4 | +6 | 8 | Advance to knockout stage |
| 3 | (Greece) AEK Athens | 4 | 1 | 2 | 1 | 4 | 4 | 0 | 5 | Advance to knockout stage |
| 4 | (Czech Republic) Mladá Boleslav | 4 | 1 | 0 | 3 | 5 | 6 | −1 | 3 | |
| 5 | (Sweden) IF Elfsborg | 4 | 0 | 1 | 3 | 3 | 12 | −9 | 1 | |

| 25 October 2007 1 | Villarreal (Spain) | 1–1 | (Italy) Fiorentina | Villarreal, Spain |
| 20:45 CEST (UTC+2) | Capdevila 86' | Report | Vieri 49' | Stadium: El Madrigal; Attendance: 15,000; Referee: Stéphane Lannoy (France) |

| 8 November 2007 2 | Mladá Boleslav (Czech Republic) | 1–2 | (Spain) Villarreal | Mladá Boleslav, Czech Republic |
| 20:30 CET (UTC+1) | Mendy 90' | Report | Nihat 33'; Cazorla 56' | Stadium: Městský Stadion; Attendance: 4,082; Referee: Damir Skomina (Slovenia) |

| 5 December 2007 3 | Villarreal (Spain) | 2–0 | (Sweden) Elfsborg | Villarreal, Spain |
| 20:45 CET (UTC+1) | Tomasson 2', 51' | Report | | Stadium: El Madrigal; Attendance: 10,000; Referee: Alexandru Tudor (Romania) |

| 20 December 2007 4 | AEK Athens (Greece) | 1–2 | (Spain) Villarreal | Athens, Greece |
| 20:45 CET (UTC+1) | Rivaldo 68' | Report | Mavuba 40'; Tomasson 69' | Stadium: Olympic Stadium; Attendance: 16,380; Referee: Gerald Lehner (Austria) |

==== Knockout phase ====
===== Round of 32 =====
| 13 February 2008 First leg | Zenit Saint Petersburg (Russia) | 1–0 | (Spain) Villarreal | Saint Petersburg, Russia |
| 18:00 CET (UTC+1) | Pogrebnyak 63' | Report | | Stadium: Petrovsky Stadium; Attendance: 21,500; Referee: Michael Weiner (Germany) |

| 21 February 2008 Second leg | Villarreal (Spain) | 2–1 (2–2 (a) agg.) | (Russia) Zenit St. Petersburg | Villarreal, Spain |
| 20:45 CET (UTC+1) | Franco 75'; Tomasson 90' | Report | Pogrebnyak 31' | Stadium: El Madrigal; Attendance: 18,000; Referee: Stefan Messner (Austria) |
