= Xabi Alonso =

Spanish football manager and player (born 1981)

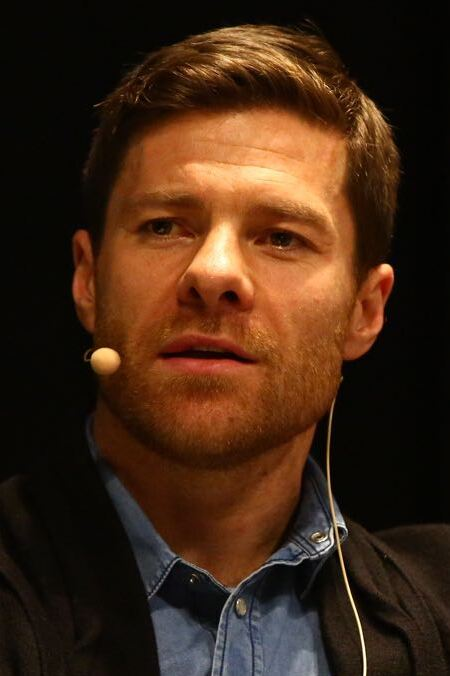
- Alonso in 2018

Personal information
- Full name: Xabier Alonso Olano
- Date of birth: 25 November 1981 (age 44)
- Place of birth: Tolosa, Spain
- Height: 1.83 m (6 ft 0 in)
- Position: Midfielder

Team information
- Current team: Chelsea (manager)

Youth career
- 1990–1999: Antiguoko

Senior career*
Years	Team	Apps	(Gls)
1999–2000	Real Sociedad B	39	(2)
1999–2004	Real Sociedad	114	(9)
2000–2001	→ Eibar (loan)	14	(0)
2004–2009	Liverpool	143	(15)
2009–2014	Real Madrid	158	(4)
2014–2017	Bayern Munich	79	(5)
Total		547	(35)

International career
2000	Spain U18	1	(0)
2002–2003	Spain U21	9	(0)
2001–2012	Basque Country	5	(0)
2003–2014	Spain	114	(16)

Managerial career
- 2019–2022: Real Sociedad B
- 2022–2025: Bayer Leverkusen
- 2025–2026: Real Madrid
- 2026–: Chelsea
Medal record
Men's football
Representing Spain
FIFA World Cup
Winner	2010 South Africa
UEFA European Championship
Winner	2008 Austria-Switzerland
Winner	2012 Poland-Ukraine
FIFA Confederations Cup
Third place	2009 South Africa
- * Club domestic league appearances and goals

Xabier Alonso Olano (Basque: [ˈʃaβi aˈlons̺o oˈlano], Spanish: [ˈʃaβj aˈlonso oˈlano]; born 25 November 1981) is a Spanish professional football manager and former player who is the manager of Premier League club Chelsea. Widely regarded as one of the greatest midfielders of his generation, he was known for his passing range and long-distance shooting. Alonso is also currently considered to be one of the best young managers in the world.

Alonso began his career at Real Sociedad, the main team of his home province Gipuzkoa. After a brief loan period at Eibar, he was appointed as captain of Real Sociedad and finished as runners-up in La Liga in the 2002–03 season. He moved to Liverpool in 2004 for £10.5 million and won the UEFA Champions League in his first season, scoring in the final. He later won the UEFA Super Cup, the FA Cup and the FA Community Shield. Alonso moved to Real Madrid in 2009 in a deal worth £30 million and won La Liga, two Copa del Rey titles, and another UEFA Champions League. He joined Bayern Munich in 2014 and won three Bundesliga titles, including a domestic double in his second season, and retired in 2017.

Alonso made his international debut for Spain in April 2003 and went on to win the European Championship twice in 2008 and 2012, as well as the 2010 World Cup. He also represented Spain at Euro 2004 and the 2006 World Cup. On 23 June 2012, Alonso won his 100th cap for Spain in the quarter-final of Euro 2012 against France, where he scored both goals in a 2–0 victory. Alonso retired from international football after the 2014 World Cup. His 114 appearances make him the eighth-most capped player in Spain's history.

Alonso coached Real Madrid's U14 team before being appointed as manager of Real Sociedad B in 2019, where he won promotion to the Segunda División in his second season. Alonso was named head coach of Bayer Leverkusen in 2022 and completed an unprecedented unbeaten domestic double in 2024, winning the club's first ever Bundesliga title and first DFB-Pokal since 1993. After two-and-a-half years with the German side, Alonso was appointed as the new head coach of his former club Real Madrid in June 2025, but left the club seven months later by mutual consent. Four months after leaving Real Madrid, Alonso agreed to take over as manager of Chelsea starting in July 2026.

== Early life ==
Alonso was born in the small town of Tolosa, Gipuzkoa, Basque Country, into a family known for its footballing prowess. His father, Periko Alonso, won La Liga twice in successive seasons with Real Sociedad and a third time after he joined Barcelona. He also featured in the national team, winning 21 caps over the course of his career.

Alonso lived in the city of Barcelona for the first six years of his life and moved to San Sebastián thereafter. It was here that his passion for football began as he whiled away his childhood played at Playa de la Concha (Shell Beach). On the Basque sands, Alonso befriended a fellow resident of Calle Matia, Mikel Arteta, and the two would battle each other in exhibitions of technical ability. He was immersed in football and his father would often bring him and his older brother, Mikel, to Sabadell's training ground to practise together. Alonso was influenced by his father's playing, taking more pleasure in passing the ball well than shooting at goal. At an early age, he decided to play as a defensive midfielder, a role which helped him learn how to distribute the ball well. This talent would later prove to be an integral part of his club and international career.

Alonso and Arteta were ambitious and dreamed of playing alongside each other for Real Sociedad when they were older. Though they attended different schools, the two young players joined forces at the local youth side Antiguoko, playing games at the weekend. Their performances attracted the attention of scouts from top Spanish sides and the young Donostiarras separated ways, ending nine years of friendly rivalry, as Alonso went to Real Sociedad and Arteta moved to Catalan giant Barcelona. Alonso's move to Real Sociedad, however, was not a companionless one, as his older brother Mikel, who had also become an adept player, joined the club together with him.

== Club career ==
=== Real Sociedad ===
Alonso quickly progressed through the youth ranks and the reserve team at Real Sociedad (winning the regionalised fourth tier in his single season with the latter) and impressed enough to earn a first-team debut at the age of 18. He made his first senior appearance against Logroñés on 1 December 1999 in a Copa del Rey match. Alonso failed to make another appearance in the season but the following year brought more opportunities. At the beginning of the 2000–01 season, Javier Clemente sent him to Segunda División club Eibar to gain experience. Alonso's father particularly felt the move to the smaller club improved him as a player. A quick turnover of managers, however, including a two-month period with Periko Alonso in charge, left Real Sociedad in a dire situation. By January 2001, Real Sociedad were bottom of the league and their new manager, John Toshack, turned to the prodigious Alonso in the hope of reversing the club's fortunes. In a surprise move, the Welsh manager made the 20-year-old the club captain, a position traditionally held by more senior players. By the end of the season, Sociedad had climbed out of the relegation zone and finished in 14th place. Toshack lauded Alonso, stating that the impression he had on the team was exceptional, especially for a player from the youth team.

Under the management of John Toshack, Alonso's captaincy marked a resurgence of form for Real Sociedad. Toshack recognised Alonso's potential and invested much time in his young captain, creating a training method designed to improve his touch and control specifically for him. The club cemented its mid-table position in the 2001–02 season, finishing in 13th place. Alonso appeared consistently in La Liga with 30 appearances over the course of the season and also scored his first league goal, finishing with a season total of three. Real Sociedad's management changed again in the summer of 2002 with the arrival of Raynald Denoueix, but Alonso kept his place in the first-team on the strength of his past performances.

The 2002–03 season was the club's best league performance since the 1981–82 season, in which they won the league. The Basque club finished second, two points behind Real Madrid, setting a club record for their highest ever points total, and qualifying for the UEFA Champions League for the first time. Alonso received much praise for his role in the club's success and was given the Best Spanish Player award by Spanish sports magazine Don Balón. In addition, Alonso significantly contributed to the club's goal tally, scoring 12 goals in all competitions. His performances earned Alonso national repute and Iñaki Sáez, the manager of the Spanish national team, called him up for the senior squad. Alonso made his international debut on 30 April 2003 in a 4–0 friendly win over Ecuador. Sáez praised Alonso, saying, "He has a fantastic range of accurate passing [and] sees football with an extraordinary clarity."

The 2003–04 season comprised mixed results for Alonso and his San Sebastián club. Alonso revelled in the opportunity to perform in Europe, appearing in all the club's games, and Real Sociedad qualified for the knockout phase of the Champions League. The club struggled under the pressure of the extra matches, however, and were promptly knocked out of the tournament by Lyon and finished 15th in La Liga. The combination of Alonso's outstanding performances and the club's poor league finish made a move away from Anoeta Stadium inevitable. Despite interest from Real Madrid, Alonso remained committed to Real Sociedad. Madrid failed to meet the £13 million price tag that José Luis Astiazarán, the Real Sociedad president, had placed on Alonso and the deal reached a stalemate. Alonso had other concerns and focused on international duty with Spain at Euro 2004. Despite the fact that Alonso's appearance at the tournament was brief, he caught the attention of retired footballer Jan Mølby, who was impressed with his precise passing abilities.

The summer transfer window at Real Sociedad saw the arrival of Alonso's childhood friend Mikel Arteta. Arteta was ecstatic at the prospect of partnering Alonso in midfield, but his excitement was short-lived. Alonso was not picked for Real Sociedad's pre-season friendlies, signalling that an offer by Liverpool was being treated seriously. On 20 August 2004, the Basque side announced they had made a deal worth £10.7 million with Liverpool and Alonso had agreed terms with the Merseyside club. Alonso did not lament the fact that a move to Real Madrid had not materialised. Instead, he concentrated on integrating with the new Spanish contingent at Liverpool under the guidance of former Valencia manager Rafael Benítez.

=== Liverpool ===
==== 2004–05: Champions League victory ====
Alonso arrived at Liverpool along with Luis García from Barcelona, marking the beginning of a new era at Anfield. New Liverpool manager Rafael Benítez sought to revolutionise the club and completely overhauled the squad, impressing his own management style and tactics upon the team. The technical Spaniards were Benítez's first signings and he remarked that their emphasis of skill over strength offered the team something different. Alonso made his Premier League debut against Bolton Wanderers at the Reebok Stadium on 29 August 2004. Liverpool lost the fixture 1–0 but Alonso was already receiving praise for his passing skills from the press. An away Premier League match against Fulham displayed more of Alonso's talents. Liverpool were losing 2–0 at half-time and Benítez brought on Alonso as a substitute after the break. He revived a deflated Liverpool and the game finished 2–4 to the Merseyside club. Furthermore, Alonso scored his first goal for the club from a free-kick to bring Liverpool ahead of the opposition.

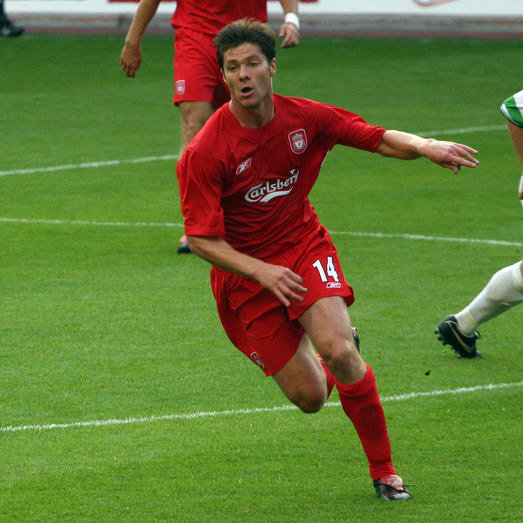
Alonso playing for Liverpool in 2005

Alonso continued to provide important goals for the club, scoring his first goal at Anfield against Arsenal in a 2–1 victory. Alonso was elated at the achievement and felt he was settling in well in England. The Arsenal match marked the return of Steven Gerrard from injury but Alonso's midfield partnership with the club captain came to a halt when Alonso suffered his first setback at Liverpool. Alonso's ankle was broken following a tackle from Frank Lampard in Liverpool's 0–1 home defeat against Chelsea on 1 January 2005 and the Spaniard was ruled out of action for three months.

Alonso made his return to the first-team in the second-leg of the Champions League quarter-final against Juventus. Alonso was not at full fitness but, as Steven Gerrard was injured, he played for the full 90 minutes and Liverpool held the score at 0–0 in Italy, defeating the eventual Italian champions 2–1 on aggregate. Kevin McCarra of The Guardian paid testament to Alonso's skill and dedication to the game, saying, "This marvellously accomplished footballer testified in the Stadio Delle Alpi that technique can overcome a serious physical disadvantage." In the semi-finals against Chelsea, Alonso received a yellow card in a tense and scrappy 0–0 draw at Stamford Bridge, making him suspended for the second-leg. Alonso was distraught that he would miss the game and vehemently contested the referee's decision to no avail. Gerrard returned from injury for the second-leg, however, and the captain steered his club to a 1–0 win with the help of a Luis García goal, qualifying for the final against Milan.

Liverpool's fifth-place finish in the Premier League left much to be desired but debut season glory still awaited Alonso in the form of the Champions League final. The club fell three goals behind Milan but completed a dramatic second-half comeback. Liverpool, trailing 3–2, were awarded a penalty and it was decided Alonso would take the spot kick. While Dida, Milan's acclaimed Brazilian goalkeeper, managed to save the penalty, Alonso fired the rebound into the roof of the net, bringing the score to 3–3. Extra-time passed without a goal from either team and Liverpool won 3–2 in the penalty shootout. Alonso was praised for his pivotal influence on the team's comeback and manager Benítez reinforced his importance for the club. Alonso was ecstatic with the win, commenting, "This is the best moment in my professional career." The epic night was also recalled to be the 'Miracle of Istanbul'.

==== 2005–06: FA Cup winner ====
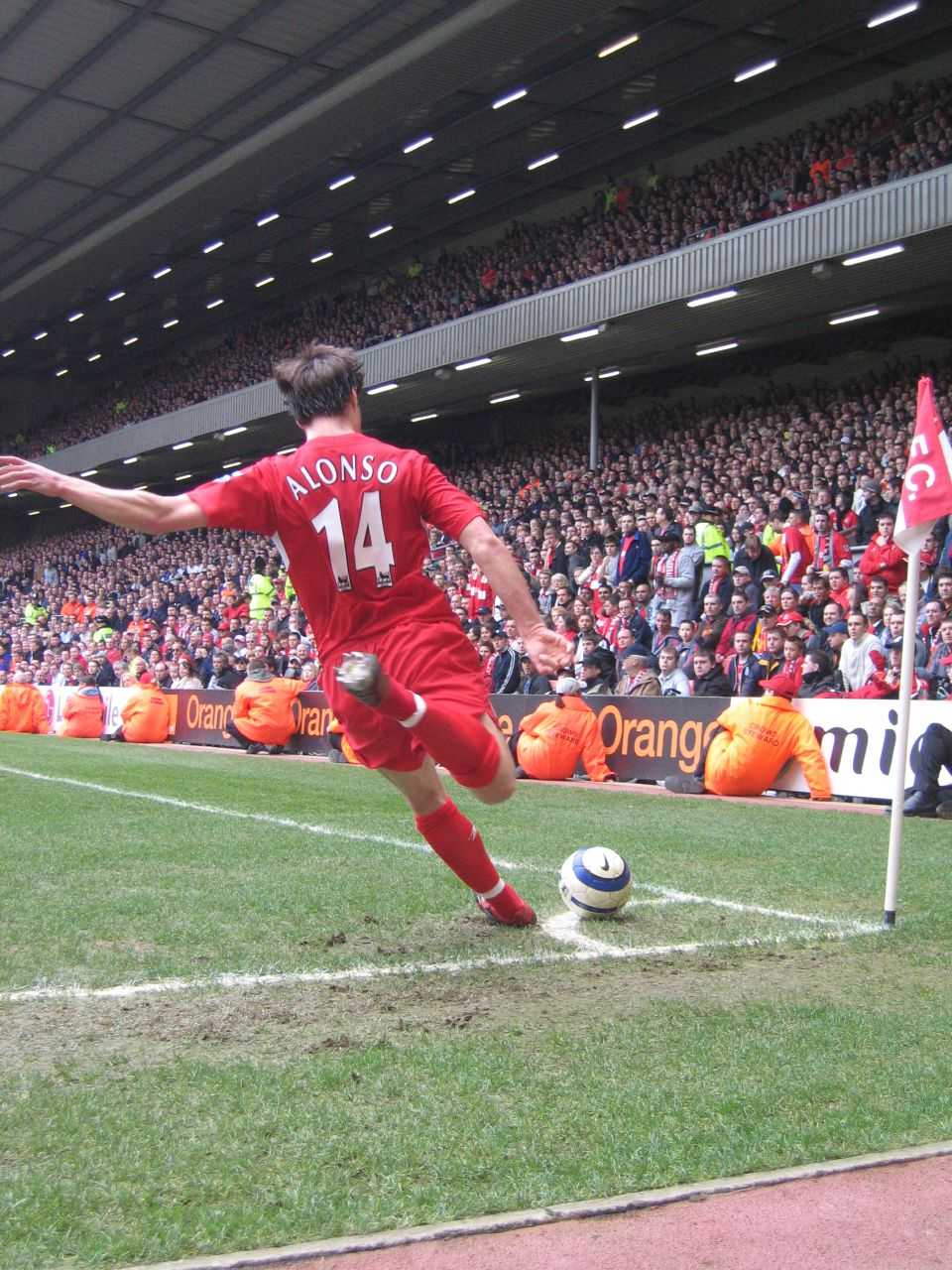
Alonso taking a corner-kick for Liverpool in 2006

Alonso was ever-present in the first team in the 2005–06 season, largely avoiding injuries that had marred his first season at the club. The summer transfer window brought Peter Crouch to Liverpool and the striker's height sparked accusations that the club would change to long-ball tactics. Crouch denied this, highlighting that Alonso's passing ability, alongside Gerrard, would define Liverpool's style of play. Alonso faced more competition for his place in the form of new arrival Mohamed Sissoko. However, Steven Gerrard's injuries and Rafael Benítez's favouring of a 4–5–1 formation ensured Alonso's place in the team. Alonso appeared in all of Liverpool's games in the Champions League but the dominance shown in the previous season had gone as the club were eliminated by Benfica in the Round of 16.

On 7 January 2006, in an FA Cup third-round match against Luton Town, Alonso assisted Liverpool to a 5–3 comeback victory after being down 3–1 early in the second-half. Alonso scored two impressive goals from distance: one from 45 yards, and the other 65 yards from goal; behind the half-way line. Consequently, Alonso's goals marked a stroke of luck for a Liverpool fan who won £25,000 from a £200 bet on Alonso scoring from within his own-half. Alonso suffered an ankle injury in a 1–3 away victory over Portsmouth, putting his participation in the FA Cup final in doubt. However, he recovered sufficiently to start the match against West Ham United and Gerrard scored Liverpool's third goal, pulling the club level with the opposition. Alonso, still affected by the injury, could not manage the entire 90 minutes and was substituted in the second-half. Liverpool won 3–1 on penalties without his help but Alonso still earned his first FA Cup winners' medal.

==== 2006–2009 ====
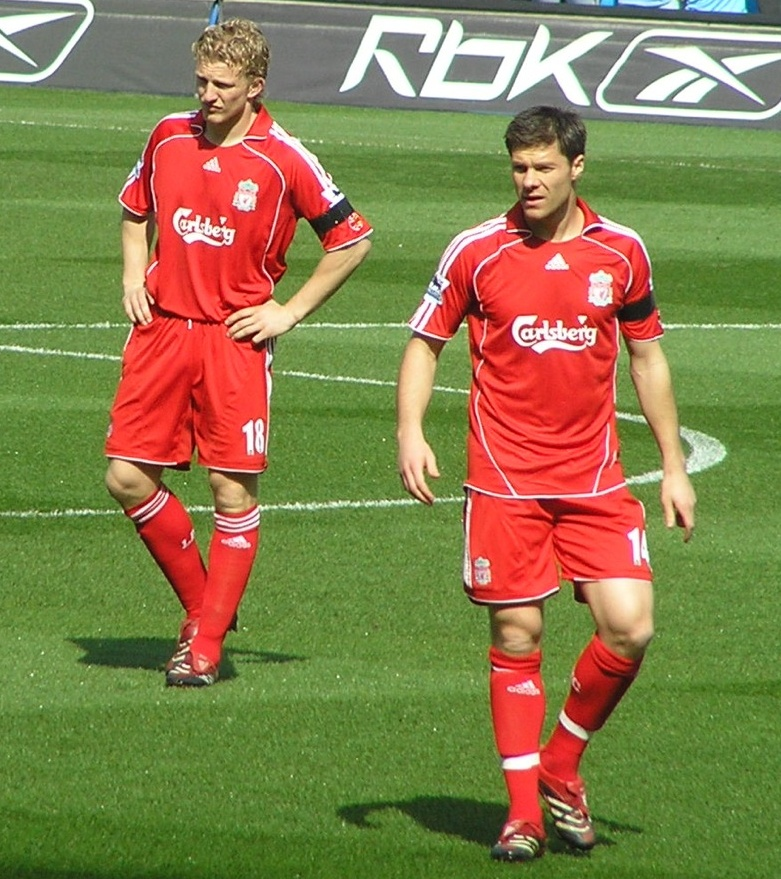
Alonso (right) playing for Liverpool in 2007

On 20 September 2006, Alonso scored what the BBC described as "an outrageous strike" from his own-half in a 2–0 win against Newcastle United. Andy Hunter of The Independent described it as "one of the most audacious goals in Anfield's rich 115-year history". Alonso rebutted claims that his 70-yard goal was all down to luck and stated he took long range shots as part of his training routine. Despite the similarity of the goals struck from inside his own-half, Alonso was in no doubt which was his best. He said, "I think this was better. The Luton goal bounced a few times, this one went quite straight. The Luton one was left-footed – it was different – but I am quite happy to score the goal." It was his first goal for Liverpool since the goal against Luton, making distinct history as the only outfield player in modern professional football history to score two consecutive goals from inside his own-half of the pitch.

On 8 June 2007, Alonso signed a five-year contract, stating, "I knew there was interest from other clubs but it was always my idea to stay here. I have been here for three seasons now and have such special feelings for the club and the supporters. I understand what Liverpool means to so many people. It is such a special club and I just didn't want to leave." The 2007–08 season started well for the Spaniard: Gerrard's absence led to Alonso playing in a more advanced position and he scored twice in a 6–0 win against Premier League newcomers Derby County. The bright beginning was short-lived, however, as a minor injury sustained in a 0–0 away draw against Portsmouth became aggravated in training. The metatarsal injury forced him out of training for six weeks but his return to the first-team was rushed and his injury recurred in his first game back. Alonso's determination and passion proved to be his downfall, and he later reflected, "I had been feeling a bit tired around that time because it was only my first game back and the match was very fast. But as a player you don't want to come off, particularly when the team is winning and I stayed on."

Alonso returned from injury in December 2007, but over the following months he increasingly faced competition for a place in midfield from Javier Mascherano and Lucas. His role in Liverpool's five-man midfield role was assured, however, as Rafael Benítez regarded him as "a top class player", stating that Alonso had the ability to change games and break down the opposition's defence. Alonso made his 100th league appearance for Liverpool on 12 January 2008 in a 1–1 away draw against Middlesbrough.

The 2008 summer transfer window suggested a move away from Merseyside, as Liverpool pursued England international Gareth Barry to replace Alonso. By the start of the 2008–09 season, neither Alonso or Barry had moved club but the drawn-out transfer saga had left the Spaniard feeling unsettled at Liverpool and unsure of his position in the team. However, the club's fans did much to restore his spirits, supporting him on and off the pitch, and Alonso responded to this, saying:

[The fans] couldn't have done more to show me how they felt... If I went out for lunch or a coffee, there was always someone who would come over and say, 'We'd love you to stay'. I'm just glad that, in the end, nothing came of it [the transfer] because it wasn't something I ever asked for.

Despite the events of the summer, Alonso made a confident start to the season and both his peers and the press praised his strength of character, citing his influence as a factor in the club's strong start to the season. Alonso's importance to the team was further underlined when he scored the only goal, through a deflection, in a 0–1 victory against Chelsea, making Liverpool the first away team to win at Stamford Bridge in over four years. Statistical analysis reflected Alonso's good form: on 11 December, figures from Opta Sports revealed he was the first Premier League player to complete 1,000 successful passes in the season. His last goal for Liverpool came in their 1–3 away win at Hull City on 25 April 2009, striking after his free-kick deflected off the Hull wall.

=== Real Madrid ===
==== 2009–10 season ====
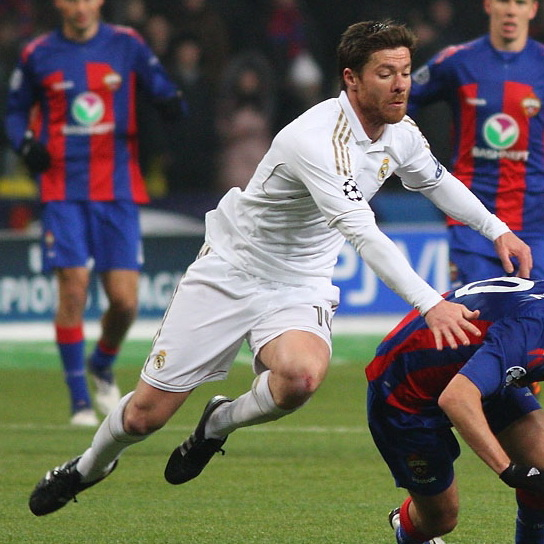
Alonso playing for Real Madrid in 2012

Alonso completed his £30 million move to Real Madrid on 5 August 2009. It has been suggested he never wanted to leave the Anfield club, with his contract existing until at least 2012, and that his departure was due to differences with Benítez. Former teammate Steven Gerrard said he was "devastated" by Alonso's decision, and cited his departure as one of the reasons behind Liverpool's poor run of form at the start of the following season.

Alonso was given the number 22 jersey in Madrid and played in a holding midfield position. He scored his first goal for his new club on 21 February 2010, a penalty in a 6–2 win against Villarreal. Unless he was injured or suspended, Manuel Pellegrini started Alonso in every match of the Champions League and in La Liga in his first season at Real Madrid. In La Liga, he helped the club finish with a club-record 96 points, three points behind winners Barcelona. It was the third time in Alonso's career when he helped his team set a new club record in terms of points gathered, while finishing in second position (he achieved the same feat with Real Sociedad in 2002–03 and with Liverpool in 2008–09). During his first season at Real Madrid, Alonso scored three goals and was considered one of the club's "most consistent" players.

Readers of Marca made Alonso part of its La Liga team of the season, as their choice defensive midfielder; the only other Real Madrid player featured was Cristiano Ronaldo. Alonso received the same accolade from ESPN Soccernet. He was also a nominee in the LFP Awards given out by the Liga de Fútbol Profesional, the Spanish Football league. Alonso was nominated in the Best Midfielder category, alongside Xavi and Javi Martínez. Several members of the Spanish press, as well as a number of Real Madrid supporters, gave Alonso a new nickname during the season: La Barba Roja ("The Red Beard").

==== 2010–14: Champions League victory ====
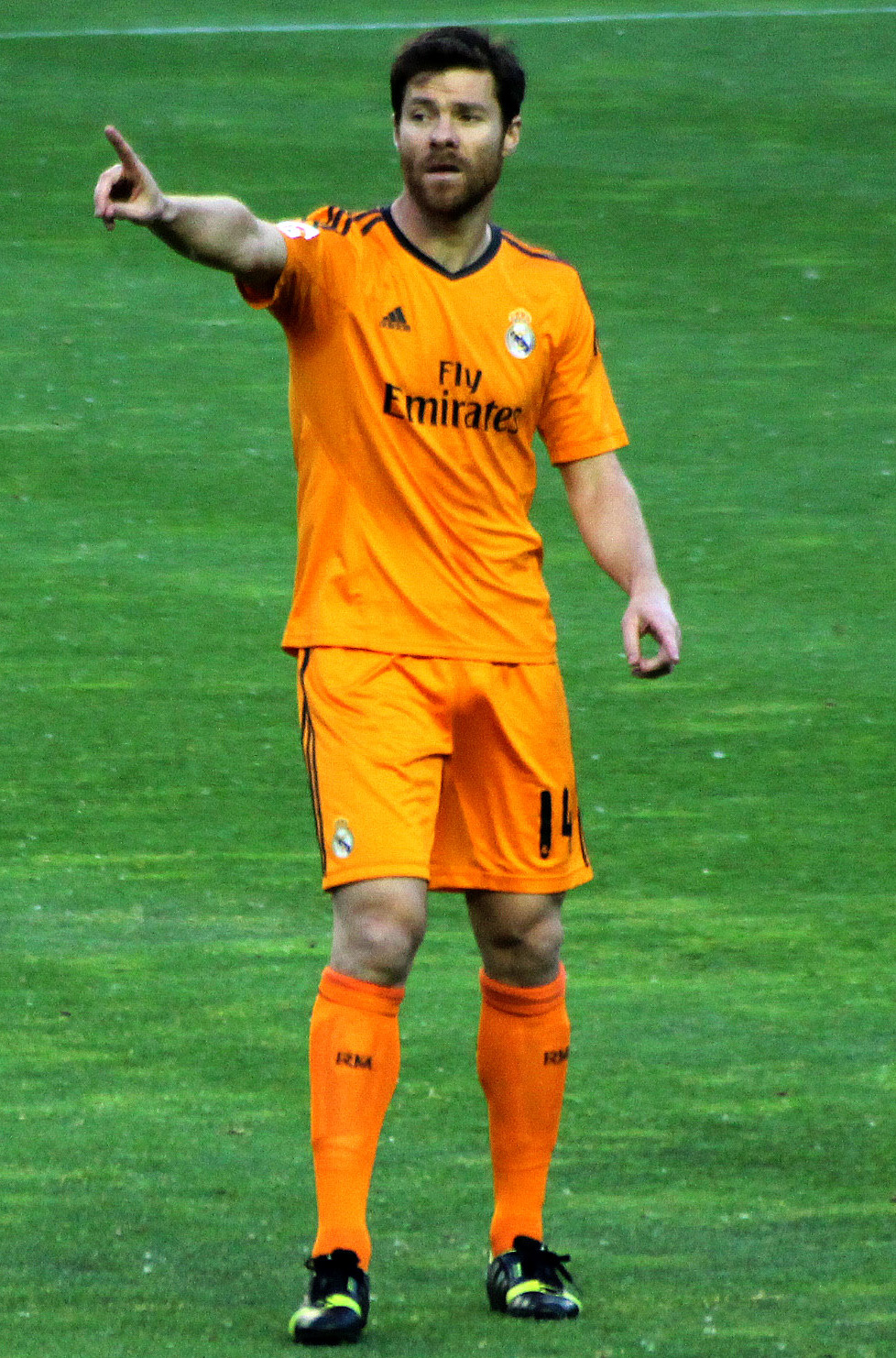
Alonso playing for Real Madrid in 2014

Alonso's second season at Real Madrid started with the arrival of new manager José Mourinho. He was given the number 14 jersey after the departure of vice-captain Guti. He scored his only goal of the 2010–11 season against Real Murcia in the Copa del Rey, and helped the club win the competition for the first time since 1993.

Alonso began his third season at Madrid by scoring the second goal in a 2–2 draw against Barcelona in the 2011 Supercopa de España at the Santiago Bernabéu. On 21 September 2011, he made his 100th appearance for Real Madrid in a 0–0 draw against Racing Santander. Alonso claimed his first league title of his career.

On 8 January 2014, Alonso signed a contract extension with Real Madrid, which would have kept him at the club until 2016. On 29 April 2014, Real Madrid defeated Bayern Munich 4–0 in the second leg of their Champions League semi-final to qualify for the final after a 5–0 aggregate win. Alonso received a yellow card after a sliding tackle on Bastian Schweinsteiger in the first-half; as he already had two before the match, this ruled him out of the final. He claimed his second UEFA Champions League winners medal as Real defeated Atlético Madrid 4–1 in extra-time.

=== Bayern Munich ===
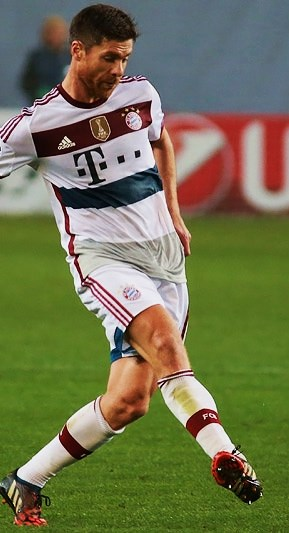
Alonso playing for Bayern Munich in 2014

On 29 August 2014, Alonso moved to Bayern Munich on a two-year deal for an undisclosed fee. He made his debut the following day, starting in a 1–1 draw against Schalke 04. On 27 September 2014, in a 0–2 win against 1. FC Köln, Alonso broke the record for most passes completed in a Bundesliga game, with 196. He scored his first goal for the club on 18 October 2014, a free-kick in a 6–0 win over Werder Bremen.

In his 100th UEFA Champions League appearance, on 17 February 2015, Alonso was sent-off for a second bookable offence in a 0–0 draw against Shakhtar Donetsk. On 28 April, he was one of four Bayern players, all FIFA World Cup winners, to miss in a 2–0 penalty shootout defeat to Borussia Dortmund in the DFB-Pokal semi-final. He was also the only player to miss as the club lost the shootout at the end of the 2015 DFL-Supercup away to VfL Wolfsburg, his attempt being saved by goalkeeper Koen Casteels.

Alonso signed a new contract with Bayern on 18 December 2015, keeping him at the club until 2017. On 9 March 2017, Alonso confirmed via Twitter his retirement from professional football at the end of the 2016–17 season. He and Bayern captain Philipp Lahm played their final professional game on 20 May, in a 4–1 victory at home against SC Freiburg in which he assisted the opening goal for Arjen Robben. He was substituted in the 82nd minute for Franck Ribéry.

== International career ==
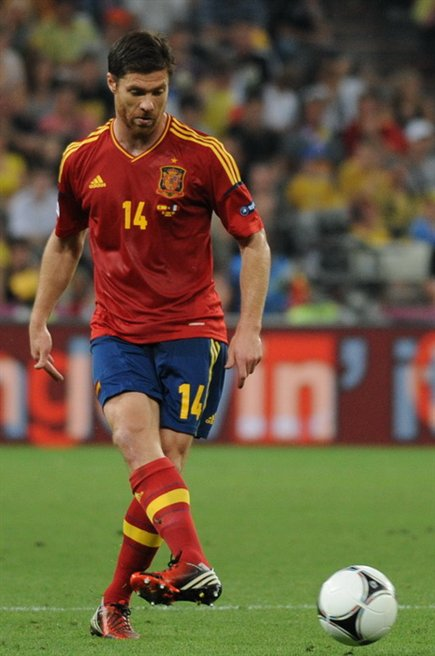
Alonso playing for Spain at Euro 2012

=== Euro 2004 ===
Alonso was first called up for the Spanish national team by manager Iñaki Sáez for a friendly match against Ecuador on 30 April 2003, aged 21. He started in the 4–0 win at the Vicente Calderón Stadium.

Sáez named Alonso in the Euro 2004 squad in Portugal. He was a substitute in the win over Russia, and started the defeat to the hosts, in a group stage exit.

=== 2006 World Cup ===
Alonso was named in Spain’s squad for the 2006 FIFA World Cup and he scored their first goal of the tournament, which was his first international goal, against Ukraine on 14 June 2006. After Spain won all their games of the group stage, they were eliminated by the eventual finalists France in the Round of 16 of the tournament.

=== Euro 2008 ===
Liverpool's 2007–08 season finished trophyless but the opportunity to win honours awaited Alonso in the form of the Euro 2008 tournament. Alonso featured mainly as a substitute but, with key players resting, he captained Spain in their final group game against Greece, earning the man of the match award. Despite a strong performance, he could not attain a starting position in the team, highlighting Spain's strength in depth. Spain went on to win the tournament and he featured in four of their six matches. Speaking to Spanish journalist Guillem Balagué, he said Spain's victory was deserved and the players' teamwork was crucial to the team's undefeated run in the tournament. Alonso was ecstatic at the achievement, stating, "It's incredible and we're all walking around in a dream. It's fantastic." Alonso scored twice in a 3–0 win in a friendly against Denmark on 20 August 2008.

=== 2009 Confederations Cup ===
At the 2009 FIFA Confederations Cup in South Africa, Spain were eliminated in the semi-finals by the United States. In the third-place play-off against the hosts, the game went to extra time after finishing 2–2; Alonso scored a free-kick in the 107th minute to win the game.

=== 2010 World Cup ===
Alonso started every game for Spain during the 2010 tournament, playing alongside Sergio Busquets and Xavi in midfield and helping his side lift their first World Cup trophy. In the 28th minute of the final against the Netherlands, he received a "Kung fu-style" kick to the chest from Dutch midfielder Nigel de Jong, the foul was controversial since it appeared to be a foul worthy of a straight red, but was only ruled to be a yellow card by referee Howard Webb. This left Alonso in pain and in fear of a broken rib. Despite this pain, he continued playing on for another hour.

=== Euro 2012 ===
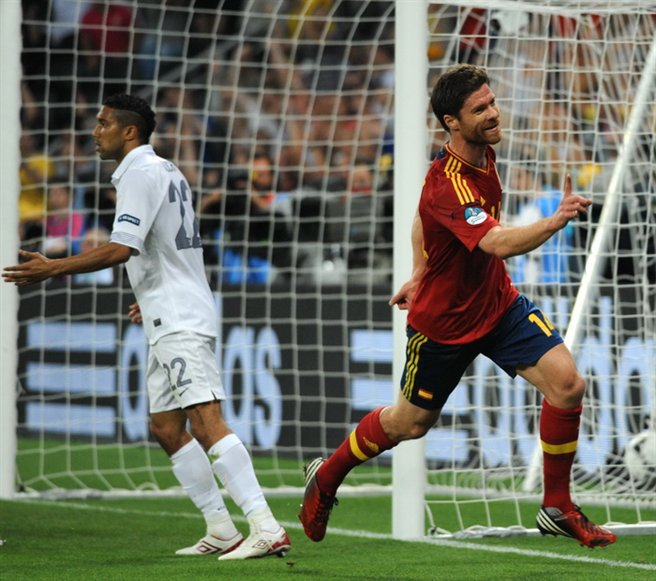
Alonso celebrates scoring against France at Euro 2012

On 23 June 2012, Alonso played his 100th match for Spain in the quarter-finals against France in which he scored both goals in a 2–0 victory. The first goal came after he headed a cross from the left flank delivered by Jordi Alba, while the second one came from a penalty kick given after Pedro was fouled by Anthony Réveillère in the dying seconds of the match. Alonso's penalty in the semi-final shoot-out against Portugal was saved by Rui Patrício in which Spain went on to win 4–2 after a 0–0 draw in the game itself. Spain went on to beat Italy 4–0 in the final; this was Alonso's third major title win with Spain.

=== 2014 World Cup ===
Spain were again amongst the favourites for victory in the 2014 FIFA World Cup, but were eliminated in the group stage. Alonso scored a penalty in the 27th minute of their first match against the Netherlands, though he was substituted in the 62nd minute with Spain down 2–1 before losing 5–1. Spain then lost 2–0 to Chile, in which Alonso received a yellow card in the first-half and was substituted at half-time with the score already at 2–0. Spain were then eliminated from the tournament but did win their final match 3–0 against Australia and finished third in the group; Alonso played 83 minutes in the match.

Alonso announced his retirement from international football on 27 August 2014.

=== Basque Country ===
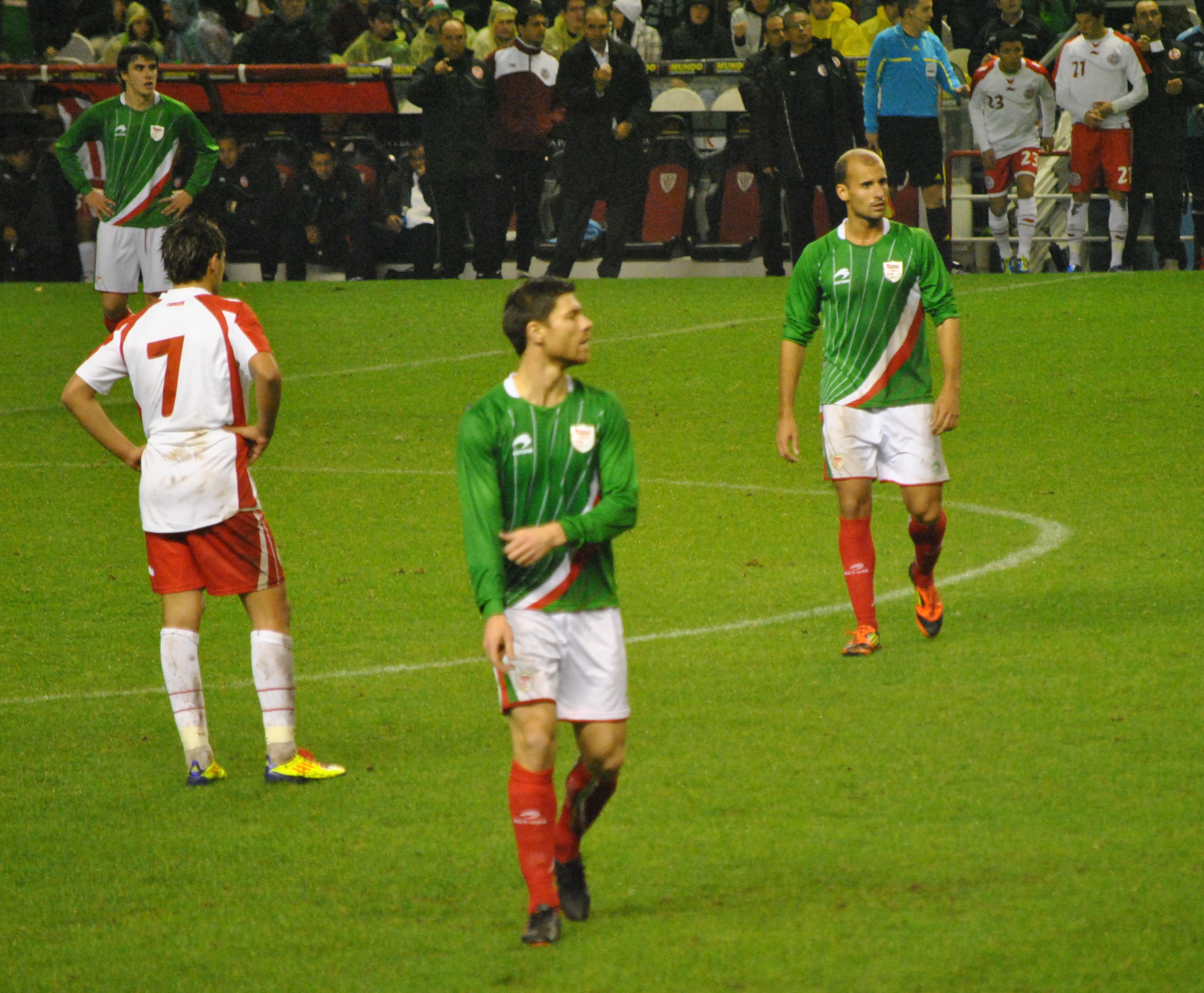
Alonso playing for the Basque Country in 2011

Alonso made his debut for the Basque Country national team in a friendly against Ghana on 29 December 2001, and received regular call ups since, while – due to his busy club schedule – not always being able to appear. Most recently, Alonso appeared for Basque on 29 December 2012 in a 6–1 victory over Bolivia.

== Style of play ==
Known for his consistency and work rate, Alonso is regarded as one of the best midfielders of his generation, recognized for his effectiveness in both creative and defensive roles.

With good technique, excellent vision, and varied passing range, he excelled in the centre in a deep-lying playmaking role, where he utilized his accurate long passing ability to create goal scoring chances for his teammates; he also utilized a powerful and accurate shot from distance, and he was an effective set-piece and penalty kick taker. Due to his height, positioning, and physical characteristics, Alonso was also effective in the air, often contributing with headed goals from set pieces when he advanced into more offensive positions.

In addition to his creative attributes, he was also capable of excelling as a defensive midfielder due to his strength and powerful physique, combined with his tenacity, tactical intelligence, aggressive tackling and his ability to read the game. He was at times criticised, however, for occasionally committing rash challenges and for his tendency to lose his composure and pick up unnecessary cards for particularly hard fouls.

Regarding Alonso's playing style, Jonathan Wilson noted in a 2013 article for The Guardian that he was an example of a more creative interpreter of the holding midfield role, who, "although capable of making tackles, focused on keeping the ball moving, occasionally raking long passes out to the flanks to change the angle of attack like an old-style regista." His role has also been likened to that of a metodista ("centre-half", in Italian football jargon), due to his ability to dictate play in midfield as well as assist his team defensively.

Since retiring, Steven Gerrard has said he believes Alonso was the best midfielder he ever played alongside. In March 2017, his former Bayern Munich manager Pep Guardiola, to whom he has occasionally been compared due to their similar role and playing style, described Alonso as one of the best midfielders he had ever seen in his life.

== Coaching and managerial career ==
=== Early years ===
In 2018, whilst completing his UEFA Elite coaching course alongside former international teammates Raúl, Xavi, Víctor Valdés, and Joan Capdevila, Alonso returned to Real Madrid where he assumed a role coaching the Real Madrid U14s.

=== Real Sociedad B ===
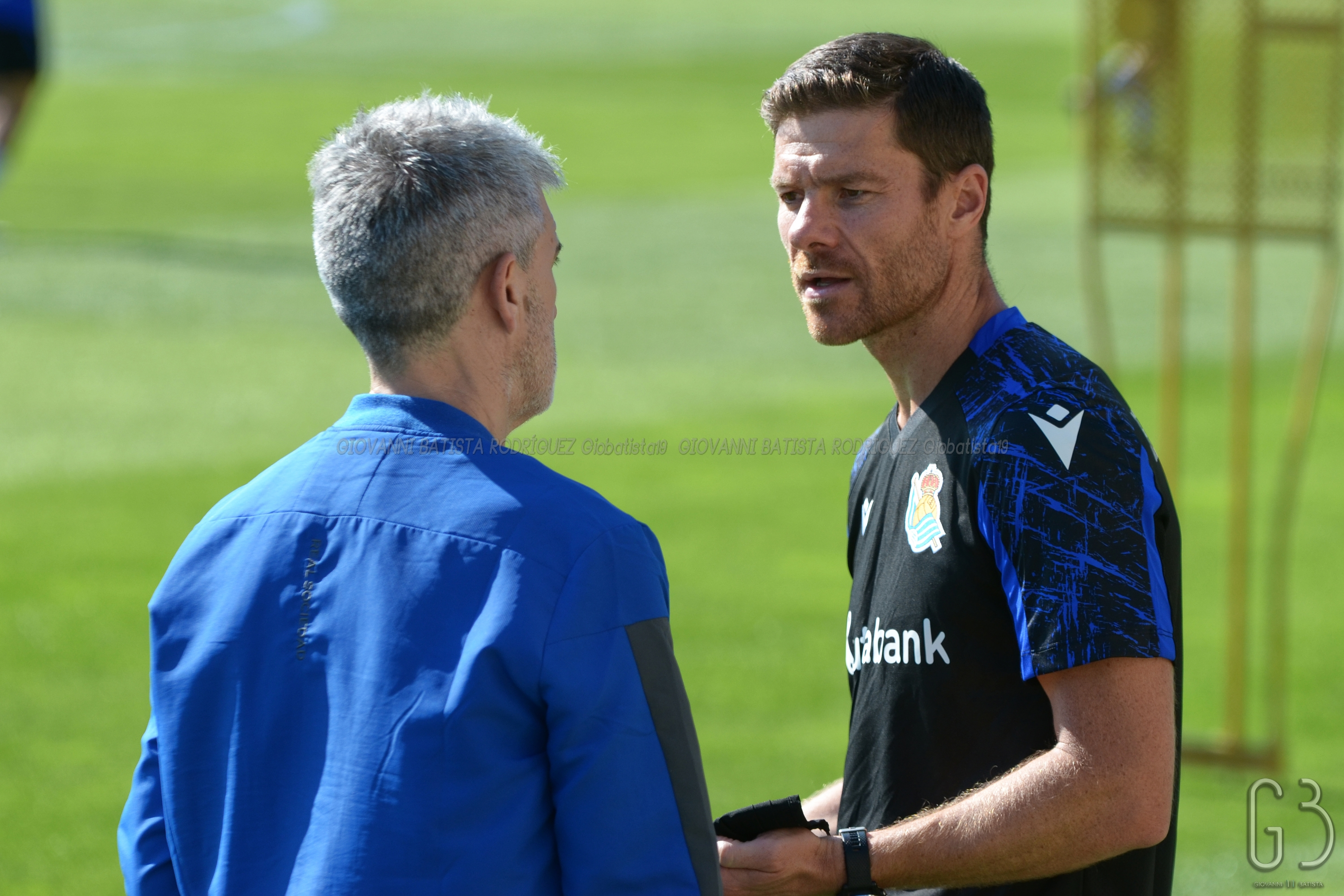
Alonso with Real Sociedad B in 2021

Alonso was appointed manager of Segunda División B club Real Sociedad B on 1 June 2019, and began the role on 9 July. On his debut on 24 August, he drew 1–1 at home to Burgos.

In Alonso's second season at Sanse, the club won promotion to the Segunda División, following a play-off win against Algeciras on 22 May 2021. The win signified Real Sociedad B's first season back in the Segunda División since 1961–62. That March, despite being heavily linked to the soon-to-be vacant manager role at Borussia Mönchengladbach, Alonso signed a one-year extension with the club.

In his first game in the second tier on 14 August 2021, Alonso won 1–0 at home against Leganés through a Jon Karrikaburu goal. On 25 May 2022, Real Sociedad announced Alonso would leave Sanse at the end of the season, with the side already relegated from the second level.

=== Bayer Leverkusen ===
On 5 October 2022, Alonso was appointed as the new head coach of Bayer Leverkusen until June 2024. He replaced Gerardo Seoane with the team second from bottom after eight Bundesliga games, having their worst start to a season since 1979. He debuted three days later with a 4–0 home win over Schalke 04. In the UEFA Europa League, Leverkusen reached their first European semi-final in 21 years, where they were eliminated by his former Real Madrid manager José Mourinho's Roma via a single first-leg goal. At the end of the season, Bayer Leverkusen finished in sixth place and qualified for next season's UEFA Europa League. In May 2023, Alonso confirmed he would remain for a second season, amidst interest from Tottenham Hotspur.

On 4 August 2023, Alonso signed a new contract until 2026. During the summer transfer window, he signed players including Switzerland captain Granit Xhaka, Jonas Hofmann, Álex Grimaldo and Victor Boniface. Alonso set his team up in a 3–4–3 formation with an emphasis on passing and counter-attack, while also only conceding five goals from open play in their first 11 Bundesliga fixtures. In the 2023–24 UEFA Europa League group stage, the club won all six games, with 19 goals scored. With 33, Leverkusen set a new record for unbeaten games, surpassing Bayern Munich's 32 in February 2024.

Alonso was linked to become the new manager of former clubs Bayern Munich, Liverpool and Real Madrid. However, on 29 March 2024, he reaffirmed his commitment to complete his contract. On 14 April, Alonso led Leverkusen to their first Bundesliga title and first German championship in history after a 5–0 win over Werder Bremen with five games remaining. On 9 May, he guided his team to achieve a new European record of 49 competitive matches without defeat in all competitions, following a 2–2 draw against Roma in the Europa League semi-final second leg, breaking Benfica's record of 48 games unbeaten between 1963 and 1965. The streak was further extended to 51 matches without defeat with two additional Bundesliga wins, making for a full unbeaten Bundesliga season, before the run ended with a 3–0 loss to Atalanta in the 2024 UEFA Europa League final. Leverkusen obtained 40 points more than the previous season, equaling VfB Stuttgart's Bundesliga record. Club records were broken as well, with 28 wins, 90 points, 89 goals scored, 24 goals conceded, 10 games won in a row, and 16 clean sheets in a season. Alonso's Bayer Leverkusen also claimed the 2023–24 DFB-Pokal on 25 May, defeating 1. FC Kaiserslautern 1–0 in the final to complete a domestic double.

Alonso began his third season in charge of Leverkusen by winning the club's first DFL-Supercup after beating VfB Stuttgart 4–3 on penalties. However, the club's title defence began poorly with a 3–2 defeat to RB Leipzig in the club’s second game of the 2024-25 Bundesliga season (which ended their 35 game unbeaten run), followed by a run of 1 win and 5 draws out of 6 games leaving Leverkusen 9 points off Bayern Munich after 10 games. In the UEFA Champions League, Alonso lead Leverkusen to 6th in the league phase ensuring automatic qualification for the knockout phase. However, the club's European campaign ended in the round of 16 after a 5–0 aggregate defeat to Bayern Munich. Leverkusen also conceded their DFB-Pokal title after being knocked out in the semi-finals by third tier side Arminia Bielefeld.

On 4 May 2025, Leverkusen drew 2–2 away with SC Freiburg, which left them 8 points behind title rivals Bayern Munich with two games left to play, confirming the Bavarian club as champions. Five days later, Alonso announced he would leave Leverkusen at the end of the season.

=== Real Madrid ===
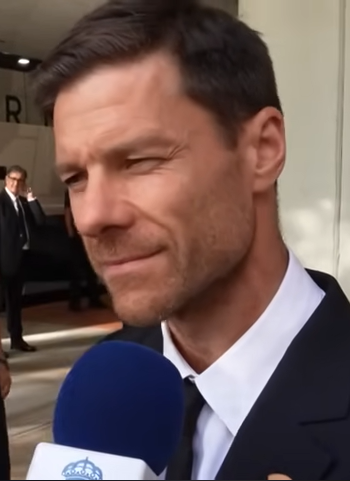
Alonso with Real Madrid in 2025

On 25 May 2025, Alonso's former club Real Madrid announced his appointment as head coach for the next three seasons, starting from 1 June 2025. He replaced Carlo Ancelotti, who was his manager at both Real Madrid from 2013–2014 and at Bayern Munich from 2016–2017.

He debuted as Real Madrid head coach in the club's 2025 FIFA Club World Cup opener versus Al-Hilal on 18 June, which resulted in a 1–1 draw. Four days later, Alonso got his first win for Los Blancos, following a 3–1 scoreline against Pachuca despite going down to ten men in the seventh minute. Real Madrid were eliminated in the semi-finals on 9 July 2025 following a 4–0 defeat to Paris Saint-Germain, marking Alonso's first loss as Real Madrid's manager.

He began the domestic campaign strongly, earning the La Liga Manager of the Month award for August 2025 after a perfect start to the season. Although Real Madrid secured a 2–1 victory over rivals Barcelona to go five points clear at the top of La Liga by late October, the team subsequently dropped important points and lost first place in the standings amid a downturn in results later in the following months.

On 12 January 2026, Alonso left Real Madrid by mutual consent one day after a 3–2 loss to Barcelona in the Supercopa de España final. His managerial stint was marked with controversy due to disputes with Vinícius Júnior.

=== Chelsea ===
On 17 May 2026, Premier League club Chelsea appointed Alonso as their new manager on a four-year contract, starting from 1 July 2026.

On 24 August 2026, Alonso won his first match in charge of Chelsea in the West London derby with a 3–2 victory against Fulham at Craven Cottage who are managed by his ex-teammate and Real Madrid successor, Álvaro Arbeloa.

== Style of management ==
Alonso is known for his versatility as a manager, using rigorous and highly organised, yet fluid set-up based on positional play. He initially favoured the 4–3–3 or 4–2–3–1 formations at Real Sociedad B, but at Bayer Leverkusen, he began to use the 3–4–3 and 3–4–2–1 formations, as well as other systems on occasion. He is known for making use of tactics such as quick counter-pressing in central areas off the ball. On the ball, his teams use lots of passing from deep areas in the build-up phase, with rehearsed, structured patterns of play dictated by a deep-lying playmaker, such as Granit Xhaka, and also make effective use of attacking wing-backs to provide width. This allows his sides to regain possession high up the pitch and move the ball forward quickly and accurately, and penetrate the opposing defensive line. His teams are also capable of dropping back into compact defensive blocks when necessary. As a manager, his tactics are influenced by his time playing under Pep Guardiola, Carlo Ancelotti, José Mourinho, Rafael Benítez, and Vicente del Bosque. In addition to his ability as a manager, he is also known for his man-management skills.

== Personal life ==
Alonso was regarded as a quiet and friendly person by his teammates at Liverpool. He is married to Nagore Aranburu and the couple have three children: Jontxu (born 2008), Ane (born 2010), and Emma (born 2013). On 11 March 2008, instead of travelling with the Liverpool squad, Alonso stayed in Merseyside to be at his wife's side while she gave birth, saying, "It was a little frustrating to miss the match against Inter but I have to be with my family at times like these." His decision to place his family ahead of a Champions League tie caused friction with manager Rafael Benítez.

Alonso and Arsenal manager Mikel Arteta were neighbours on the same street while growing up in San Sebastián and later lived near each other in Liverpool while Arteta was an Everton player. Alonso convinced Arteta to transfer to Everton after he told him how happy he was living in Liverpool. Alonso also helped persuade former Real Sociedad teammate Juan Ugarte to make a move to Wales by joining Wrexham in 2004.

Alonso's brother Mikel played for Spanish club Real Unión. He previously spent a season on loan at Bolton Wanderers in the 2007–08 season with an option for a permanent deal. However, the team opted not to extend the loan deal and he returned to Spain to train with Alonso's former club, Real Sociedad. Alonso also has another brother involved in football, Jon, who works as a referee. Alonso is also a Meath Gaelic football supporter.

Even while playing at Real Madrid, Alonso declared himself a Liverpool supporter and returns to watch games at Anfield when his schedule allows. He was quoted in The Times Online in 2011 as saying, "I am still a Liverpool fan and will be forever, absolutely" and that he will raise his Liverpool-born son Jontxu as a Red supporter.

Alonso is related to footballer Eliseo Mouriño, who was a member of Argentina’s squad for the 1958 FIFA World Cup. Mouriño was a first cousin of Alonso’s paternal grandmother.

== Career statistics ==
=== Club ===
Appearances and goals by club, season and competition
Club	Season	League			National cup (Note: Includes Copa del Rey, FA Cup, DFB-Pokal)		League cup (Note: Includes Football League Cup)		Europe (Note: All appearances in UEFA Champions League)		Other		Total	
Club	Season	Division	Apps	Goals	Apps	Goals	Apps	Goals	Apps	Goals	Apps	Goals	Apps	Goals
Real Sociedad	1999–2000	La Liga	0	0	1	0	–		–		–		1	0
Real Sociedad	2000–01	La Liga	18	0	0	0	–		–		–		18	0
Real Sociedad	2001–02	La Liga	29	3	0	0	–		–		–		29	3
Real Sociedad	2002–03	La Liga	33	3	1	0	–		–		–		34	3
Real Sociedad	2003–04	La Liga	34	3	0	0	–		8	1	–		42	4
Real Sociedad	Total		114	9	2	0	–		8	1	–		124	10
Eibar (loan)	2000–01	Segunda División	14	0	0	0	–		–		–		14	0
Liverpool	2004–05	Premier League	24	2	0	0	0	0	8	1	–		32	3
Liverpool	2005–06	Premier League	35	3	5	2	0	0	11	0	2 (Note: One appearance in UEFA Super Cup, one appearance in FIFA Club World Championship)	0	53	5
Liverpool	2006–07	Premier League	32	4	1	0	2	0	15	0	1 (Note: Appearance in FA Community Shield)	0	51	4
Liverpool	2007–08	Premier League	19	2	3	0	1	0	4	0	–		27	2
Liverpool	2008–09	Premier League	33	4	3	0	1	0	10	1	–		47	5
Liverpool	Total		143	15	12	2	4	0	48	2	3	0	210	19
Real Madrid	2009–10	La Liga	34	3	0	0	–		7	0	–		41	3
Real Madrid	2010–11	La Liga	34	0	7	1	–		11	0	–		52	1
Real Madrid	2011–12	La Liga	36	1	4	0	–		10	0	2 (Note: Appearances in Supercopa de España)	1	52	2
Real Madrid	2012–13	La Liga	28	0	7	0	–		10	0	2	0	47	0
Real Madrid	2013–14	La Liga	26	0	7	0	–		9	0	0	0	42	0
Real Madrid	2014–15	La Liga	0	0	—		–		—		2	0	2	0
Real Madrid	Total		158	4	25	1	–		47	0	6	1	236	6
Bayern Munich	2014–15	Bundesliga	26	2	4	0	–		10	2	—		40	4
Bayern Munich	2015–16	Bundesliga	26	0	4	1	–		8	1	1 (Note: Appearance in DFL-Supercup)	0	39	2
Bayern Munich	2016–17	Bundesliga	27	3	3	0	–		7	0	1	0	38	3
Bayern Munich	Total		79	5	11	1	–		25	3	2	0	117	9
Career total			508	33	50	4	4	0	128	6	11	1	701	44

=== International ===
Appearances and goals by national team and year
National team	Year	Apps	Goals
Spain
Spain	2003	5	0
Spain	2004	11	0
Spain	2005	6	0
Spain	2006	11	1
Spain	2007	6	0
Spain	2008	14	2
Spain	2009	12	4
Spain	2010	16	2
Spain	2011	11	3
Spain	2012	14	3
Spain	2013	3*	0
Spain	2014	5	1
Career total		114	16

- The match away against Equatorial Guinea in November 2013 although included in Alonso's 114 caps is not considered a full international by FIFA (too many substitutions) but it is official for the RFEF.

Scores and results list Spain's goal tally first, score column indicates score after each Alonso goal.

List of international goals scored by Xabi Alonso
No.	Date	Venue	Opponent	Score	Result	Competition
1	14 June 2006	Zentralstadion, Leipzig, Germany	Ukraine	1–0	4–0	2006 FIFA World Cup
2	20 August 2008	Parken Stadium, Copenhagen, Denmark	Denmark	1–0	3–0	Friendly
3	20 August 2008	Parken Stadium, Copenhagen, Denmark	Denmark	3–0	3–0	Friendly
4	1 April 2009	Ali Sami Yen Stadium, Istanbul, Turkey	Turkey	1–1	2–1	2010 FIFA World Cup Qualification
5	28 June 2009	Royal Bafokeng Stadium, Rustenburg, South Africa	South Africa	3–2	3–2	2009 FIFA Confederations Cup
6	14 November 2009	Vicente Calderón Stadium, Madrid, Spain	Argentina	1–0	2–1	Friendly
7	14 November 2009	Vicente Calderón Stadium, Madrid, Spain	Argentina	2–1	2–1	Friendly
8	29 May 2010	Tivoli-Neu, Innsbruck, Austria	Saudi Arabia	2–1	3–2	Friendly
9	8 June 2010	Estadio Nueva Condomina, Murcia, Spain	Poland	3–0	6–0	Friendly
10	7 June 2011	Estadio José Antonio Anzoátegui, Puerto la Cruz, Venezuela	Venezuela	3–0	3–0	Friendly
11	10 August 2011	Stadio San Nicola, Bari, Italy	Italy	1–1	1–2	Friendly
12	7 October 2011	Generali Arena, Prague, Czech Republic	Czech Republic	2–0	2–0	UEFA Euro 2012 Qualification
13	30 May 2012	Stade de Suisse, Bern, Switzerland	South Korea	2–1	4–1	Friendly
14	23 June 2012	Donbas Arena, Donetsk, Ukraine	France	1–0	2–0	UEFA Euro 2012
15	23 June 2012	Donbas Arena, Donetsk, Ukraine	France	2–0	2–0	UEFA Euro 2012
16	13 June 2014	Arena Fonte Nova, Salvador, Brazil	Netherlands	1–0	1–5	2014 FIFA World Cup

== Managerial statistics ==
As of match played 21 November 2026

Managerial record by team and tenure
Team	From	To	Record								Ref.
Team	From	To	G	W	D	L	GF	GA	GD	Win %	Ref.
Real Sociedad B	1 June 2019	28 May 2022	98	40	23	35	140	120	+20	40.82	
Bayer Leverkusen	5 October 2022	17 May 2025	140	88	33	19	306	149	+157	62.86	
Real Madrid	1 June 2025	12 January 2026	34	24	4	6	72	38	+34	70.59	
Chelsea	1 July 2026	Present	14	7	2	5	29	24	+5	50.00	
Career Total			286	159	62	65	547	331	+216	55.59	

== Honours ==
=== Player ===
Liverpool

- FA Cup: 2005–06
- FA Community Shield: 2006
- UEFA Champions League: 2004–05; runner-up: 2006–07
- UEFA Super Cup: 2005
- FIFA Club World Championship runner-up: 2005

Real Madrid

- La Liga: 2011–12
- Copa del Rey: 2010–11, 2013–14; runner-up: 2012–13
- Supercopa de España: 2012
- UEFA Champions League: 2013–14

Bayern Munich

- Bundesliga: 2014–15, 2015–16, 2016–17
- DFB-Pokal: 2015–16
- DFL-Supercup: 2016

Spain

- FIFA World Cup: 2010
- UEFA European Championship: 2008, 2012

Individual

- Spanish Player of the Year: 2003
- BBC Goal of the Month: November 2004
- FIFA FIFPro World XI: 2011, 2012; 2nd team: 2014; 3rd team: 2013; 4th team: 2015; 5th team: 2016
- La Liga Best Midfielder: 2011–12
- UEFA European Championship Team of the Tournament: 2012
- UEFA Champions League Squad of the Season: 2013–14
- Bundesliga Team of the Season: 2014–15

Decorations

- Gold Medal of the Royal Order of Sporting Merit: 2011

=== Manager ===
Bayer Leverkusen

- Bundesliga: 2023–24
- DFB-Pokal: 2023–24
- DFL-Supercup: 2024
- UEFA Europa League runner-up: 2023–24

Real Madrid

- Supercopa de España runner-up: 2026

Individual

- Globe Soccer Best Coach of the Year: 2024
- VDV Coach of the Season (Silver Bench): 2023–24
- Football Manager of the Year in Germany: 2024
- La Liga Manager of the Month: August 2025

== See also ==
- List of footballers with 100 or more UEFA Champions League appearances
- List of men's footballers with 100 or more international caps
