= Mikel Alonso =

Spanish footballer (born 1980)

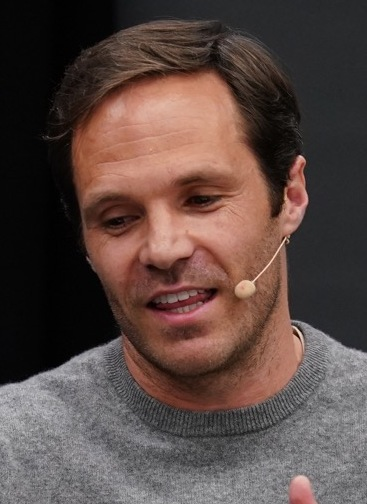
- Alonso in 2020

Personal information
- Full name: Mikel Alonso Olano
- Date of birth: 17 May 1980 (age 46)
- Place of birth: Tolosa, Spain
- Height: 1.83 m (6 ft 0 in)
- Position: Midfielder

Youth career
- 1990–1997: Antiguoko
- 1997–1998: Athletic Bilbao
- 1998–1999: Antiguoko

Senior career*
Years	Team	Apps	(Gls)
1999–2002	Real Sociedad B	103	(8)
2001–2008	Real Sociedad	104	(2)
2003–2004	→ Numancia (loan)	10	(1)
2007–2008	→ Bolton Wanderers (loan)	7	(0)
2009–2011	Tenerife	66	(4)
2011–2012	Charlton Athletic	0	(0)
2014–2018	Real Unión	117	(7)
Total		407	(22)

International career
2004–2007	Basque Country	5	(0)

Managerial career
- 2018–2020: Antiguoko (youth)
- 2021–2022: Real Sociedad B (assistant)
- * Club domestic league appearances and goals

Mikel Alonso Olano (Basque: [ˈmikel aˈlons̺o oˈlano], Spanish: [ˈmikel aˈlonso oˈlano]; born 17 May 1980) is a Spanish former professional footballer who played as a midfielder.

He spent most of his career at Real Sociedad, making 110 appearances and scoring four goals over seven seasons. He totalled 132 games and three goals in La Liga for that club and Tenerife, while also recording 48 matches and four goals in the Segunda División for the latter and Numancia.

Additionally, Alonso had two brief spells in England, finishing his career at Real Unión.

== Club career ==
=== Real Sociedad ===
A product of Real Sociedad's youth ranks, as was younger brother Xabi, Alonso was born in Tolosa, Gipuzkoa, and made his debut in La Liga on 22 April 2001 against Real Valladolid (seven minutes played, 3–1 home win). However, the presence of his sibling and Mikel Aranburu in central midfield meant that he was restricted to a supporting role, and he was then sent on loan to Segunda División's Numancia for 2003–04 but, while he was dedicated to the Soria team's bid for promotion, he remained keen to establish himself at Real Sociedad, returning at the end of the season; under the management of José Mari Bakero, the player's importance to the team was demonstrated in the 2005–06 campaign, when he was their most used footballer at 37 games.

After his brother Xabi had already settled in England with Liverpool – having arrived during the summer of 2004 – Alonso also decided to move to the Premier League and joined Bolton Wanderers, another team in north-west England, on a loan deal on 10 July 2007 with the option of a permanent deal at the end of the season. However, after coach Sammy Lee was dismissed he fell out of favour and, under Gary Megson, he only made two competitive appearances; subsequently, the Trotters opted to not extend his contract.

Alonso went back to Spain for 2008–09 but, upon his return to the Basque Country, discovered he was not a part of coach Juan Manuel Lillo's plans and was sent on trial to Olympiacos. This proved unsuccessful, however, and Real Sociedad exercised their right to buy the remainder of his contract, releasing him as a free agent.

=== Tenerife ===
Following his release from Real Sociedad, Swansea City boss Roberto Martínez offered compatriot Alonso a chance to regain fitness. After his brother highly recommended both coach and the player to arrange the deal, he accepted the offer and joined the squad in training.

However, Alonso would not remain in Wales and, in late January 2009, moved to Tenerife after being contacted regarding a season-long deal. He accepted the offer and stated that he had "heard good things" about his new team. However, he remained a fan of his former club Real Sociedad, stating that, although both sides competed in the second tier, he hoped they gained promotion; he contributed eleven matches in a return to the top flight after a seven-year absence.

In the 2009–10 campaign, Alonso began as a starter, scoring with a rare header in the second matchday, a 1–0 home win against Athletic Bilbao. However, he appeared less regularly in the final stretch, as the Canarians were eventually relegated back.

=== Charlton Athletic ===
In late June 2011, following another Tenerife relegation, 31-year-old Alonso returned to England, joining Football League One club Charlton Athletic. He made his official debut on 5 October in the Football League Trophy tie at The Valley against Brentford, conceding a penalty in an eventual 3–0 loss.

Alonso was released at the end of the season, without making any appearances in any of the three major competitions.

=== Real Unión ===
On 14 July 2014, after nearly two years without a club, Alonso signed for Real Unión in Segunda División B. Four years later, the 38-year-old announced his retirement.

Subsequently, Alonso worked as manager at Antiguoko and Real Sociedad B, acting as assistant to his brother at the latter.

== International career ==
Alonso earned five caps for the Basque Country regional team.

== Personal life ==
The first son of Periko Alonso, who played with Real Sociedad and Barcelona, Alonso grew up surrounded by football: he and his younger brother, Xabi – who also appeared for Real Sociedad before representing with individual and team success Liverpool, Real Madrid and Bayern Munich – would go training with their father when he was playing for Sabadell; all three were midfielders.

Influenced by his father, Alonso followed his example and became a professional footballer in the San Sebastián side.
