= Sebastián Viera =

Uruguayan footballer (born 1983)

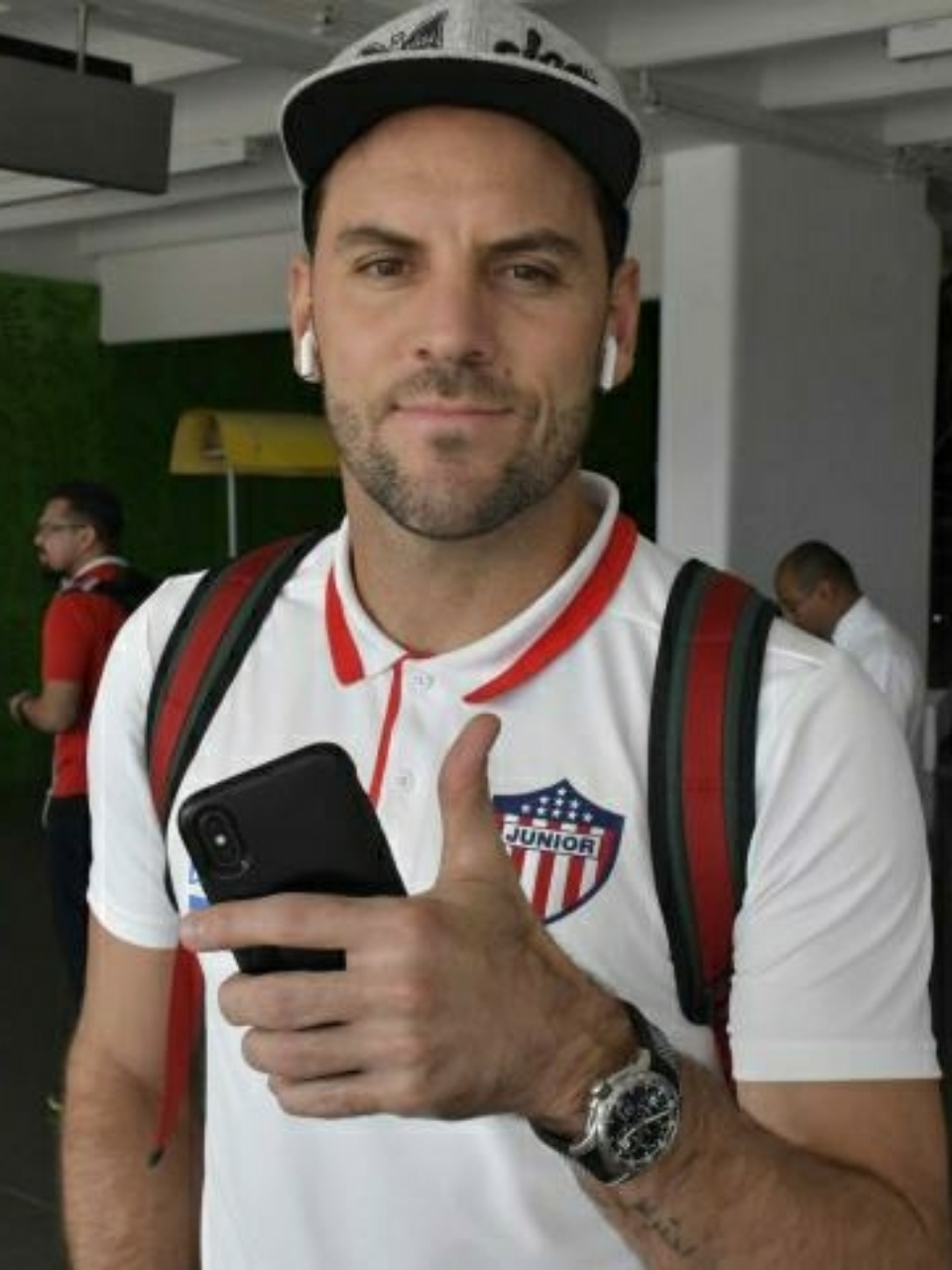
- Viera with Junior in 2020

Personal information
- Full name: Mario Sebastián Viera Galaín
- Date of birth: 7 March 1983 (age 43)
- Place of birth: Florida, Uruguay
- Height: 1.84 m (6 ft 0 in)
- Position: Goalkeeper

Team information
- Current team: Junior (manager)

Youth career
- Quilmes Florida
- Atlético Florida

Senior career*
Years	Team	Apps	(Gls)
2003–2005	Nacional	58	(0)
2005–2009	Villarreal	75	(0)
2009–2010	AEL	20	(0)
2011–2023	Junior	487	(11)
Total		640	(11)

International career
2004–2009	Uruguay	15	(0)

Managerial career
- 2024–2025: Real Cartagena
- 2026–: Junior
- * Club domestic league appearances and goals

Mario Sebastián Viera Galaín (born 7 March 1983) is a Uruguayan former professional footballer who played as a goalkeeper. He is currently manager of Liga DIMAYOR club Junior.

During his 20-year senior career, he represented mainly Junior. He also played, other than in his own country, in Spain and Greece.

Viera was part of the Uruguay squad at the 2004 Copa América.

== Club career ==
Born in Florida, Florida Department, Viera started his professional career with Club Nacional de Football, notably winning the 2005 Uruguayan Primera División without losing a single match. After three seasons, he was expected to move to Premier League club Arsenal in August 2005, but its manager Arsène Wenger withdrew from the deal when the player did not pass his medical.

Eventually, Viera signed with Villarreal CF in Spain, moving alongside Mariano Barbosa (also a goalkeeper) on a four-year contract. He would be an undisputed starter the following two seasons, although he missed both legs of the 2005–06 UEFA Champions League semi-finals against Arsenal.

Viera eventually lost his job midway through the 2007–08 campaign to newly signed Diego López, and never regained it again – no La Liga games in 2008–09 – being released in July 2009. On 7 December he signed a one-and-a-half-year contract with Greek side Athlitiki Enosi Larissa FC, being made eligible to play however only in January 2010; his contract was terminated in December.

In April 2011, Viera joined Atlético Junior, remaining in Colombia until his retirement aged 40. He won seven trophies during his 12-year spell in Barranquilla, including three Categoría Primera A championships.

In 2020, Viera was voted the second-most important player in Junior's history in a poll conducted by the website La Cháchara. With 638 total appearances to his credit, he also scored a league-best 11 goals from free kicks.

Viera was one of only two goalkeepers that FC Barcelona's Lionel Messi failed to score against while facing them on three occasions, the other being Renan of Valencia CF and Xerez CD.

== International career ==
Viera made his debut for Uruguay on 18 July 2004 in a Copa América quarter-final match against Paraguay, having been called as a late replacement for injured starter Fabián Carini. He also featured in the penalty shootout loss to eventual winners Brazil.

In five years, Viera earned 15 caps.

== Coaching career ==
Viera started working as a coach in the country where he had retired, being appointed at Primera B team Real Cartagena on 20 August 2024. Under his tenure, they reached the semi-finals of the tournament, missing out on a chance to play a promotion play-off by placing third in the season's aggregate table; he left by mutual agreement on 21 April 2025, following a 3–2 loss at home to Jaguares de Córdoba.

On 1 September 2026, Viera signed as head coach of his former club Junior.

== Personal life ==
Viera's father, also named Mario, was also a professional footballer and a goalkeeper.

== Career statistics ==
=== Club ===
Appearances and goals by club, season and competition
Club	Season	League			Cup		Continental		Other		Total	
Club	Season	Division	Apps	Goals	Apps	Goals	Apps	Goals	Apps	Goals	Apps	Goals
Nacional	2003	Uruguayan Primera División	16	0	—		—		—		16	0
Nacional	2004	Uruguayan Primera División	26	0	—		8	0	—		34	0
Nacional	2005	Uruguayan Primera División	16	0	—		5	0	—		21	0
Nacional	Total		58	0	—		13	0	—		71	0
Villarreal	2005–06	La Liga	29	0	0	0	8	0	—		37	0
Villarreal	2006–07	La Liga	28	0	2	0	1	0	—		31	0
Villarreal	2007–08	La Liga	18	0	0	0	0	0	—		18	0
Villarreal	2008–09	La Liga	0	0	2	0	1	0	—		3	0
Villarreal	Total		75	0	4	0	10	0	—		89	0
AEL	2009–10	Super League Greece	14	0	—		—		—		14	0
AEL	2010–11	Super League Greece	6	0	0	0	—		—		6	0
AEL	Total		20	0	0	0	—		—		20	0
Junior	2011	Categoría Primera A	32	0	9	0	5	0	—		46	0
Junior	2012	Categoría Primera A	40	0	0	0	4	0	2	0	46	0
Junior	2013	Categoría Primera A	40	0	2	0	—		—		42	0
Junior	2014	Categoría Primera A	40	0	10	0	—		—		50	0
Junior	2015	Categoría Primera A	45	0	8	0	4	0	—		57	0
Junior	2016	Categoría Primera A	41	2	3	0	8	1	—		52	3
Junior	2017	Categoría Primera A	38	2	8	0	12	0	—		58	2
Junior	2018	Categoría Primera A	35	1	3	0	19	0	—		57	1
Junior	2019	Categoría Primera A	50	1	3	0	6	0	—		59	1
Junior	2020	Categoría Primera A	23	0	2	0	12	1	2	0	39	1
Junior	2021	Categoría Primera A	45	3	1	0	12	0	—		58	3
Junior	2022	Categoría Primera A	48	1	7	0	8	0	—		63	1
Junior	2023	Categoría Primera A	10	1	0	0	1	0	—		11	1
Junior	Total		487	11	56	0	91	2	4	0	638	13
Career total			640	11	60	0	115	2	4	0	819	13

=== International ===
Appearances and goals by national team and year
National team	Year	Apps	Goals
Uruguay	2004	6	0
Uruguay	2005	4	0
Uruguay	2006	1	0
Uruguay	2007	0	0
Uruguay	2009	4	0
Total		15	0

== Honours ==
Nacional

- Uruguayan Primera División: 2005

Junior

- Categoría Primera A: 2011, 2018, 2019
- Copa Colombia: 2015, 2017
- Superliga Colombiana: 2019, 2020

== See also ==
- List of goalscoring goalkeepers
