= 2006–07 Villarreal CF season =

Villarreal
2006–07 season
- President: Fernando Roig
- Head coach: Manuel Pellegrini
- Stadium: El Madrigal
- La Liga: 5th
- Copa del Rey: Round of 16
- UEFA Intertoto Cup: Third round
- Top goalscorer: League: Diego Forlán (19); All: Diego Forlán (21)
Home colours	Away colours

The 2006–07 season was Villarreal Club de Fútbol's 84th season in existence and the club's 7th consecutive season in the top flight of Spanish football. In addition to the domestic league, Villarreal participated in this season's editions of the Copa del Rey and the UEFA Intertoto Cup. The season covered the period from 1 July 2006 to 30 June 2007.

== Players ==
=== First-team squad ===
Note: Flags indicate national team as defined under FIFA eligibility rules; some limited exceptions apply. Players may hold more than one non-FIFA nationality.

No.	Pos.	Nation	Player
1	GK	(Uruguay) URU	Sebastián Viera
2	DF	(Argentina) ARG	Gonzalo Rodríguez
4	DF	(Spain) ESP	José Enrique
5	FW	(Uruguay) URU	Diego Forlán
6	MF	(Spain) ESP	Josico
7	MF	(France) FRA	Robert Pirès
9	FW	(Mexico) MEX	Guillermo Franco
10	MF	(Spain) ESP	Cani
11	FW	(Denmark) DEN	Jon Dahl Tomasson (on loan from VfB Stuttgart)
12	DF	(France) FRA	Pascal Cygan
14	MF	(Italy) ITA	Alessio Tacchinardi (on loan from Juventus)
15	FW	(Turkey) TUR	Nihat Kahveci
16	DF	(Spain) ESP	Quique Álvarez captain

No.	Pos.	Nation	Player
17	DF	(Spain) ESP	Javi Venta
18	MF	(Argentina) ARG	Leandro Somoza
19	MF	(Spain) ESP	Marcos Senna
20	DF	(Argentina) ARG	Fabricio Fuentes
21	MF	(Chile) CHI	Matías Fernández
22	DF	(Bolivia) BOL	Juan Manuel Peña
23	FW	(Spain) ESP	José Mari
24	DF	(Spain) ESP	Josemi
25	GK	(Argentina) ARG	Mariano Barbosa
27	MF	(Spain) ESP	Marcos García
28	MF	(Spain) ESP	Bruno Soriano
33	FW	(Spain) ESP	Jonathan Pereira

== Competitions ==
=== Overall record ===
Competition	First match	Last match	Starting round	Final position	Record							
Competition	First match	Last match	Starting round	Final position	Pld	W	D	L	GF	GA	GD	Win %
La Liga	27 August 2006	17 June 2007	Matchday 1	5th	38	18	8	12	48	44	+4	47.37
Copa del Rey	25 October 2006	17 January 2007	Round of 32	Round of 16	4	2	0	2	5	3	+2	50.00
UEFA Intertoto Cup	15 July 2006	22 July 2006	Third round	Third round	2	0	1	1	2	3	−1	0.00
Total					44	20	9	15	55	50	+5	45.45

Source: Competitions

=== La Liga ===
==== League table ====
Pos	Team	Pld	W	D	L	GF	GA	GD	Pts	Qualification or relegation
3	Sevilla	38	21	8	9	64	35	+29	71	Qualification for the Champions League third qualifying round
4	Valencia	38	20	6	12	57	42	+15	66	Qualification for the Champions League third qualifying round
5	Villarreal	38	18	8	12	48	44	+4	62	Qualification for the UEFA Cup first round
6	Zaragoza	38	16	12	10	55	43	+12	60 (Note: ATM 0–1 ZAR; ZAR 1–0 ATM)	Qualification for the UEFA Cup first round
7	Atlético Madrid	38	17	9	12	46	39	+7	60	Qualification for the Intertoto Cup third round

Source: LFP
Rules for classification: 1st points; 2nd head-to-head points; 3rd head-to-head goal difference; 4th head-to-head goals scored; 5th goal difference; 6th number of goals scored; 7th Fair-play points

==== Results summary ====
Overall								Home						Away					
Pld	W	D	L	GF	GA	GD	Pts	W	D	L	GF	GA	GD	W	D	L	GF	GA	GD
38	18	8	12	48	44	+4	62	10	4	5	23	18	+5	8	4	7	25	26	−1

Source: La Liga

==== Results by round ====
Round	1	2	3	4	5	6	7	8	9	10	11	12	13	14	15	16	17	18	19	20	21	22	23	24	25	26	27	28	29	30	31	32	33	34	35	36	37	38
Ground	A	H	A	H	A	H	H	A	H	A	H	A	H	A	H	A	H	A	H	H	A	H	A	H	A	A	H	A	H	A	H	A	H	A	H	A	H	A
Result	D	L	L	W	W	D	D	W	W	L	W	L	W	D	L	L	L	W	D	W	L	L	L	W	D	W	D	D	L	L	W	W	W	W	W	W	W	W
Position	12	14	17	14	10	10	11	9	8	10	9	9	8	8	9	11	11	11	11	9	10	13	13	12	12	11	11	11	12	12	12	10	10	8	7	7	6	5

Source: La Liga
A = Away; H = Home; W = Win; D = Draw; L = Loss

==== Matches ====
27 August 2006 1	Real Madrid	0–0	Villarreal	Madrid
				Stadium: Santiago Bernabéu

10 September 2006 2	Villarreal	0–1	Recreativo	Villarreal
				Stadium: El Madrigal

16 September 2006 3	Deportivo La Coruña	2–0	Villarreal	A Coruña
				Stadium: Riazor

24 September 2006 4	Villarreal	3–2	Zaragoza	Villarreal
				Stadium: El Madrigal

1 October 2006 5	Mallorca	1–2	Villarreal	Palma
				Stadium: Ono Estadi

15 October 2006 6	Villarreal	0–0	Espanyol	Villarreal
				Stadium: El Madrigal

21 October 2006 7	Villarreal	1–1	Levante	Villarreal
				Stadium: El Madrigal

29 October 2006 8	Real Sociedad	0–1	Villarreal	San Sebastián
				Stadium: Anoeta

5 November 2006 9	Villarreal	3–2	Real Betis	Villarreal
				Stadium: El Madrigal

11 November 2006 10	Atlético Madrid	3–1	Villarreal	Madrid
				Stadium: Vicente Calderón

19 November 2006 11	Villarreal	1–0	Getafe	Villarreal
				Stadium: El Madrigal

25 November 2006 12	Barcelona	4–0	Villarreal	Barcelona
				Stadium: Camp Nou

3 December 2006 13	Villarreal	2–0	Gimnàstic	Villarreal
				Stadium: El Madrigal

10 December 2006 14	Celta Vigo	1–1	Villarreal	Vigo
				Stadium: Balaídos

17 December 2006 15	Villarreal	1–4	Osasuna	Villarreal
				Stadium: El Madrigal

20 December 2006 16	Racing Santander	2–1	Villarreal	Santander
				Stadium: El Sardinero

7 January 2007 17	Villarreal	0–1	Valencia	Villarreal
				Stadium: El Madrigal

14 January 2007 18	Athletic Bilbao	0–1	Villarreal	Bilbao
				Stadium: San Mamés

20 January 2007 19	Villarreal	0–0	Sevilla	Villarreal
				Stadium: El Madrigal

27 January 2007 20	Villarreal	1–0	Real Madrid	Villarreal
				Stadium: El Madrigal

4 February 2007 21	Recreativo	2–1	Villarreal	Huelva
				Stadium: Nuevo Colombino

11 February 2007 22	Villarreal	0–2	Deportivo La Coruña	Villarreal
				Stadium: El Madrigal

17 February 2007 23	Zaragoza	1–0	Villarreal	Zaragoza
				Stadium: La Romareda

25 February 2007 24	Villarreal	2–1	Mallorca	Villarreal
				Stadium: El Madrigal

4 March 2007 25	Espanyol	1–1	Villarreal	Barcelona
				Stadium: Olímpic Lluís Companys

10 March 2007 26	Levante	0–2	Villarreal	Valencia
				Stadium: Ciutat de València

18 March 2007 27	Villarreal	1–1	Real Sociedad	Villarreal
				Stadium: El Madrigal

31 March 2007 28	Real Betis	3–3	Villarreal	Seville
				Stadium: Manuel Ruiz de Lopera

8 April 2007 29	Villarreal	0–1	Atlético Madrid	Villarreal
				Stadium: El Madrigal

15 April 2007 30	Getafe	3–0	Villarreal	Getafe
				Stadium: Coliseum Alfonso Pérez

22 April 2007 31	Villarreal	2–0	Barcelona	Villarreal
				Stadium: El Madrigal

29 April 2007 32	Gimnàstic	0–3	Villarreal	Tarragona
				Stadium: Nou Estadi

6 May 2007 33	Villarreal	1–0	Celta Vigo	Villarreal
				Stadium: El Madrigal

13 May 2007 34	Osasuna	1–4	Villarreal	Pamplona
				Stadium: El Sadar

20 May 2007 35	Villarreal	2–1	Racing Santander	Villarreal
				Stadium: El Madrigal

26 May 2007 36	Valencia	2–3	Villarreal	Valencia
				Stadium: Mestalla

9 June 2007 37	Villarreal	3–1	Athletic Bilbao	Villarreal
				Stadium: El Madrigal

17 June 2007 38	Sevilla	0–1	Villarreal	Seville
				Stadium: Ramón Sánchez Pizjuán

=== Copa del Rey ===
==== Round of 32 ====
25 October 2006 First leg	Castellón	0–2	Villarreal	Castellón de la Plana
				Stadium: Castàlia

8 November 2006 Second leg	Villarreal	2–0 (4–0 agg.)	Castellón	Villarreal
				Stadium: El Madrigal

==== Round of 16 ====
10 January 2007 First leg	Valladolid	2–1	Villarreal	Valladolid
20:00 CET (UTC+1)	Losada 20'; J. Llorente 69'	Report	José Mari 21'	Stadium: José Zorrilla; Referee: Alfonso Pérez Burrull

17 January 2007 Second leg	Villarreal	0–1 (1–3 agg.)	Valladolid	Villarreal
21:00 CET (UTC+1)		Report	Baraja 27'	Stadium: El Madrigal; Referee: Carlos Velasco Carballo

=== UEFA Intertoto Cup ===
==== Third round ====
15 July 2006 First leg	Villarreal (Spain)	1–2	(Slovenia) Maribor	Villarreal, Spain
21:45 CEST (UTC+2)	Forlán 71'		Rakič 40'; Mihelič 83'	Stadium: El Madrigal; Attendance: 8,000; Referee: Kevin Blom (Netherlands)

22 July 2006 Second leg	Maribor (Slovenia)	1–1 (3–2 agg.)	(Spain) Villarreal	Maribor, Slovenia
20:00 CEST (UTC+2)	Zajc 89'		Nihat 85'	Stadium: Ljudski vrt Attendance: 9,000; Referee: Carlo Bertolini (Switzerland)
