= 2003–04 Real Sociedad season =

Real Sociedad
2003–04 season
- President: Jokin Aperribay
- Head coach: Raynald Denoueix
- Stadium: Anoeta Stadium
- La Liga: 15th
- Copa del Rey: Quarter-finals
- UEFA Champions League: Round of 16
- Top goalscorer: League: Nihat Kahveci (14); All: Nihat Kahveci (14)

The 2003–04 season was the 95th season in the history of Real Sociedad and the club's 38th consecutive season in the top flight of Spanish football. In addition to the domestic league, Real Sociedad participated in this season's editions of the Copa del Rey and the UEFA Champions League.

== Competitions ==
=== Overall record ===
Competition	First match	Last match	Starting round	Final position	Record							
Competition	First match	Last match	Starting round	Final position	Pld	W	D	L	GF	GA	GD	Win %
La Liga	15 August 2021	23 May 2004	Matchday 1	15th	38	11	13	14	49	53	−4	28.95
Copa del Rey	8 October 2003	16 December 2003	Round of 64	Round of 32	2	1	0	1	3	3	+0	50.00
UEFA Champions League	17 September 2003	9 March 2004	Group stage	Round of 16	8	2	3	3	8	10	−2	25.00
Total					48	14	16	18	60	66	−6	29.17

Source: Competitions

=== La Liga ===
==== League table ====
Pos	Team	Pld	W	D	L	GF	GA	GD	Pts
13	Osasuna	38	11	15	12	38	37	+1	48 (Note: OSA 0–1 ZAR; ZAR 1–0 OSA)
14	Albacete	38	13	8	17	40	48	−8	47
15	Real Sociedad	38	11	13	14	49	53	−4	46
16	Espanyol	38	13	4	21	48	64	−16	43
17	Racing Santander (Note: Racing Santander were docked one point deduction due to using foreign players exceeds the quota during a match against Osasuna on 14 December 2003.)	38	11	10	17	48	63	−15	42

Source: LFP
Rules for classification: 1st points; 2nd head-to-head points; 3rd head-to-head goal difference; 4th head-to-head goals scored; 5th goal difference; 6th number of goals scored; 7th Fair-play points

==== Results summary ====
Overall								Home						Away					
Pld	W	D	L	GF	GA	GD	Pts	W	D	L	GF	GA	GD	W	D	L	GF	GA	GD
0	0	0	0	0	0	0	0	0	0	0	0	0	0	0	0	0	0	0	0

Source: La Liga

==== Results by round ====
Round	1	2	3	4	5	6
Ground	A	H	A	H	A	H
Result	D	D	W	W	L	D
Position						

A = Away; H = Home; W = Win; D = Draw; L = Loss

==== Matches ====
30 August 2003 1	Espanyol	1–1	Real Sociedad	Barcelona
CEST (UTC+2)

2 September 2003 2	Real Sociedad	1–1	Celta Vigo	San Sebastián
CEST (UTC+2)

13 September 2003 3	Racing Santander	0–1	Real Sociedad	Santander
CEST (UTC+2)

21 September 2003 4	Real Sociedad	3–0	Zaragoza	San Sebastián
CEST (UTC+2)

27 September 2003 5	Athletic Bilbao	1–0	Real Sociedad	Bilbao
CEST (UTC+2)

5 October 2003 6	Real Sociedad	1–1	Sevilla	San Sebastián
CEST (UTC+2)

18 October 2003 7	Albacete	3–1	Real Sociedad	Albacete
CEST (UTC+2)

26 October 2003 8	Real Sociedad	1–0	Osauna	San Sebastián
CEST (UTC+2)

30 October 2003 9	Atlético Madrid	4–0	Real Sociedad	Madrid
CEST (UTC+2)

2 November 2003 10	Real Sociedad	3–3	Barcelona	San Sebastián
CEST (UTC+2)

8 November 2003 11	Deportivo La Coruña	2–1	Real Sociedad	A Coruña
CEST (UTC+2)

22 November 2003 12	Real Sociedad	0–1	Mallorca	San Sebastián
CEST (UTC+2)

29 November 2003 13	Murcia	2–2	Real Sociedad	Murcia
CEST (UTC+2)

2 December 2003 14	Real Sociedad	0–0	Valencia	San Sebastián
CEST (UTC+2)

6 December 2003 15	Real Sociedad	0–4	Real Betis	San Sebastián
CEST (UTC+2)

13 December 2003 16	Villarreal	2–0	Real Sociedad	Villarreal
CEST (UTC+2)

20 December 2003 17	Real Sociedad	1–3	Valladolid	San Sebastián
CEST (UTC+2)

4 January 2004 18	Málaga	1–2	Real Sociedad	Málaga
CEST (UTC+2)

10 January 2004 19	Real Sociedad	1–0	Real Madrid	San Sebastián
CEST (UTC+2)

18 January 2004 20	Real Sociedad	3–1	Espanyol	San Sebastián
CEST (UTC+2)

25 January 2004 21	Celta Vigo	2–5	Real Sociedad	Vigo
CEST (UTC+2)

1 February 2004 22	Real Sociedad	1–0	Racing Santander	San Sebastián
CEST (UTC+2)

8 February 2004 24	Zaragoza	2–1	Real Sociedad	Zaragoza
CEST (UTC+2)

14 February 2004 24	Real Sociedad	1–1	Athletic Bilbao	San Sebastián
CEST (UTC+2)

21 February 2004 25	Sevilla	1–0	Real Sociedad	Seville
CEST (UTC+2)

29 February 2004 26	Real Sociedad	0–1	Albacete	San Sebastián
CEST (UTC+2)

6 March 2004 27	Osasuna	1–1	Real Sociedad	Pamplona
CEST (UTC+2)

13 March 2004 28	Real Sociedad	2–1	Atlético Madrid	San Sebastián
CEST (UTC+2)

21 March 2004 29	Barcelona	1–0	Real Sociedad	Barcelona
CEST (UTC+2)

27 March 2004 30	Real Sociedad	1–2	Deportivo La Coruña	San Sebastián
CEST (UTC+2)

4 April 2004 31	Mallorca	1–1	Real Sociedad	Palma
CEST (UTC+2)

11 April 2004 32	Real Sociedad	2–0	Murcia	San Sebastián
CEST (UTC+2)

18 April 2004 33	Valencia	2–2	Real Sociedad	Valencia
CEST (UTC+2)

25 April 2004 34	Real Betis	2–1	Real Sociedad	Seville
CEST (UTC+2)

2 May 2004 35	Real Sociedad	2–2	Villarreal	San Sebastián
CEST (UTC+2)

9 May 2004 36	Valladolid	2–2	Real Sociedad	Valladolid
CEST (UTC+2)

16 May 2004 37	Real Sociedad	1–1	Málaga	San Sebastián
CEST (UTC+2)

23 May 2004 38	Real Madrid	1–4	Real Sociedad	Madrid
CEST (UTC+2)
