= 2000–01 Feyenoord season =

Feyenoord
2000–01 season
- Chairman: Jorien van den Herik
- Manager: Bert van Marwijk
- Stadium: De Kuip
- Eredivisie: 2nd
- KNVB Cup: Quarter-finals
- UEFA Champions League: Third qualifying round
- UEFA Cup: Round of 16
- Top goalscorer: League: Jon Dahl Tomasson (15); All: Jon Dahl Tomasson (17)
- Highest home attendance: 46,000 vs Ajax
- Lowest home attendance: 23,600 vs FC Basel
- Average home league attendance: 36,024
Home colours	Away colours

The 2000–01 season was Feyenoord's 93rd season of football, the club's 45th season in the Eredivisie and its 79th consecutive season in the top flight of Dutch football. It is the first season with new manager Bert van Marwijk who arrived from Fortuna Sittard. Feyenoord competed in the 2000–01 KNVB Cup, being eliminated at the round of 16 and the 2000–01 UEFA Cup in the 1st round after being eliminated by Sturm Graz in the 3rd Qualifying round of the UEFA Champions League.

== Eredivisie ==
=== League table ===
Pos	Team	Pld	W	D	L	GF	GA	GD	Pts	Qualification or relegation
1	PSV Eindhoven (C)	34	25	8	1	73	23	+50	83	Qualification to Champions League group stage
2	Feyenoord	34	21	3	10	67	37	+30	66	Qualification to Champions League group stage
3	Ajax	34	18	7	9	85	43	+42	61	Qualification to Champions League third qualifying round
4	Roda JC Kerkrade	34	17	8	9	59	41	+18	59	Qualification to UEFA Cup first round (Note: FC Twente qualified for the UEFA Cup by winning the 2000–01 KNVB Cup.)
5	Utrecht	34	17	8	9	58	43	+15	59	Qualification to UEFA Cup first round

Source: voetbal.com
Rules for classification: 1) Points; 2) Goal difference; 3) Goals scored; 4) Head-to-head points; 5) Head-to-head goal difference; 6) Head-to-head away goals scored; 7) Play-off if relevant for deciding champion, relegation or participating in a European league, otherwise by draw. 8) Penalty shoot-out (only after a play-off)
(C) Champions

=== Results by matchday ===
Matchday	1	2	3	4	5	6	7	8	9	10	11	12	13	14	15	16	17	18	19	20	21	22	23	24	25	26	27	28	29	30	31	32	33	34
Ground	H	A	H	A	A	H	A	H	H	A	A	H	H	H	A	A	H	H	A	A	H	H	A	A	H	A	A	H	H	A	H	A	H	A
Result	W	W	W	W	W	W	D	W	W	L	W	W	W	W	W	L	W	W	L	W	W	L	D	L	W	L	L	L	W	L	L	W	D	W
Position	5	2	5	1	6	4	5	2	2	1	1	3	3	1	1	1	1	1	1	1	2	2	2	2	2	2	2	2	2	2	2	2	2	2

Updated to match(es) played on 27 May 2001. Source: Voetbal.com
A = Away; H = Home; W = Win; D = Draw; L = Loss

=== Matches ===
These are the matches scheduled for Feyenoord in the 2000-2001 Eredivisie season.

19 August 2000 1	Feyenoord	2 – 0	AZ Alkmaar	Rotterdam
	Bosvelt 40'; Somália 88'	Report	(yellow card) 50' (yellow-red card) Buskermolen; (yellow card) 56' (yellow-red card) van Galen	Stadium: Stadion Feijenoord; Attendance: 32.500; Referee: Luinge

27 August 2000 2	FC Twente	1 – 2	Feyenoord	Enschede
	Vennegoor of Hesselink 20'	Report	24', 47' Tomasson	Stadium: Arke Stadion; Attendance: 13.800; Referee: van der Ende

9 September 2000 3	Feyenoord	3 – 1	RKC Waalwijk	Rotterdam
	Tomasson 11'; Kalou 28'; Korneev 69'	Report	82' Hoogendorp; (yellow card) 87' (yellow-red card) Teixeira	Stadium: Stadion Feijenoord; Attendance: 33.500; Referee: van Dijk

1 October 2000 4	De Graafschap	2 – 3	Feyenoord	Doetinchem
	Turpijn 5'; Hupkes 7'	Report	13' Korneev; 56', 61' Tomasson	Stadium: De Vijverberg; Attendance: 10.800; Referee: Wegereef

14 October 2000 5	Sparta Rotterdam	1 – 4	Feyenoord	Rotterdam
	Marbus 40'	Report	32' (pen.) Korneev; 85' Bosvelt; 88' Paauwe; 90' Kalou	Stadium: Het Kasteel; Attendance: 11.000; Referee: Bossen

21 October 2000 6	Feyenoord	2 – 0	SC Heerenveen	Rotterdam
	Leonardo 13'; Korneev 54'	Report		Stadium: Stadion Feijenoord; Attendance: 45.000; Referee: Uilenberg

29 October 2000 7	FC Utrecht	1 – 1	Feyenoord	Utrecht
	Dombi 31'	Report	55'Kalou	Stadium: Stadion Galgenwaard; Attendance: 13.400; Referee: van Dijk

2 November 2000 8	Feyenoord	5 – 1	RBC Roosendaal	Rotterdam
	Tomasson 12'; Gyan 44', 52'; Bosvelt 47'; Paauwe 57'	Report	66' Hertog	Stadium: Stadion Feijenoord; Attendance: 24.500; Referee: van Egmond

5 November 2000 9	Feyenoord	4 – 2	Roda JC Kerkrade	Rotterdam
	Bosvelt 32' (pen.), 34', 42'; Kalou 87'	Report	36' (Own goal) Tininho; 90' Soetaers	Stadium: Stadion Feijenoord; Attendance: 35000; Referee: Jol

12 November 2000 10	PSV Eindhoven	1 – 0	Feyenoord	Eindhoven
	Bruggink 78' (pen.)	Report		Stadium: Philips Stadion; Attendance: 33.000; Referee: Temmink

19 November 2000 11	NEC Nijmegen	1 – 3	Feyenoord	Nijmegen
	Wisgerhof 65'	Report	25' (Own goal) Wisgerhof; 36', 60' Emerton	Stadium: De Goffert; Attendance: 12.500; Referee: Luinge

26 November 2000 12	Feyenoord	1 – 0	Willem II	Rotterdam
	Tomasson 9'	Report		Stadium: Stadion Feijenoord; Attendance: 31.000; Referee: van Hulten

29 November 2000 13	Feyenoord	2 – 1	Sparta Rotterdam	Rotterdam
	Kayis 4' (Own goal); Paauwe 75'	Report	79' El-Khattabi	Stadium: Stadion Feijenoord; Attendance: 31.500; Referee: Braamhaar

10 December 2000 14	Feyenoord	3 – 1	Ajax	Rotterdam
	Kalou 25'; Paauwe 51'; Tomasson 63'	Report	66' (Own goal) de Haan	Stadium: Stadion Feijenoord; Attendance: 46.000; Referee: Uilenberg

13 December 2000 15	Fortuna Sittard	2 – 4	Feyenoord	Sittard
	Gerritsen 8'; Krijgsman 62'	Report	14' Connolly; 18' Paauwe; 42' Smolarek; 55' Tomasson	Stadium: Wagner & Partners Stadion; Attendance: 9.500; Referee: Wegereef

17 December 2000 16	FC Groningen	1 – 0	Feyenoord	Groningen
	Johansson 80'	Report		Stadium: Oosterpark Stadion; Attendance: 13.000; Referee: Jol

20 December 2000 17	Feyenoord	2 – 0	Vitesse Arnhem	Rotterdam
	Kalou 70'; Bosvelt 78'	Report		Stadium: Stadion Feijenoord; Attendance: 40.000; Referee: Bossen

28 January 2001 18	Feyenoord	2 – 0	NAC Breda	Rotterdam
	Kalou 83'; Tomasson 90'	Report		Stadium: Stadion Feijenoord; Attendance: 33.000; Referee: Temmink

31 January 2001 19	SC Heerenveen	1 – 0	Feyenoord	Heerenveen
	de Nooijer 90'	Report	(red card) 2' Kalou	Stadium: Abe Lenstra Stadion; Attendance: 14.400; Referee: Luinge

4 February 2001 20	AZ Alkmaar	0 – 3	Feyenoord	Alkmaar
		Report	33', 83' Kalou; 82' Tomasson	Stadium: Alkmaarderhout; Attendance: 8.265; Referee: van Dijk

11 February 2001 21	Feyenoord	1 – 0	FC Groningen	Rotterdam
	Schoenmakers 73' (Own goal)	Report		Stadium: Stadion Feijenoord; Attendance: 41.291; Referee: Uilenberg

25 February 2001 22	Feyenoord	1 – 2	PSV Eindhoven	Rotterdam
	Paauwe 86'	Report	6' Ooijer; 73' de Jong	Stadium: Stadion Feijenoord; Attendance: 45.000; Referee: Jol

4 March 2001 23	Vitesse Arnhem	0 – 0	Feyenoord	Arnhem
		Report		Stadium: GelreDome; Attendance: 28.323; Referee: Braamhaar

11 March 2001 24	Willem II	3 – 1	Feyenoord	Tilburg
	Bombarda 3'; Ceesay 19'; Landzaat 90'	Report	72' van Wonderen	Stadium: Koning Willem II Stadion; Attendance: 14.300; Referee: Haverkort

18 March 2001 25	Feyenoord	5 – 1	FC Twente	Rotterdam
	Kalou 4'; Bosvelt 14' (pen.); Connolly 63'; Tomasson 66'; Smolarek 73'	Report	2' Booth	Stadium: Stadion Feijenoord; Attendance: 38.354; Referee: van Egmond

1 April 2001 26	RKC Waalwijk	2 – 0	Feyenoord	Waalwijk
	Hoogendorp 27', 57' (pen.)	Report		Stadium: Mandemakers Stadion; Attendance: 6.200; Referee: Temmink

8 April 2001 27	NAC Breda	1 – 0	Feyenoord	Breda
	Stewart 1'; Sergio (red card) 6'	Report		Stadium: Rat Verlegh Stadion; Attendance: 14.817; Referee: Jol

15 April 2001 28	Feyenoord	1 – 2	De Graafschap	Rotterdam
	Elmander 81'	Report	9' den Turk; 72' Tumba	Stadium: Stadion Feijenoord; Attendance: 41.270; Referee: van Egmond

21 April 2001 29	Feyenoord	3 – 0	NEC Nijmegen	Rotterdam
	Tomasson 10', 15'; Smolarek 83'	Report		Stadium: Stadion Feijenoord; Attendance: 40.154; Referee: Luinge

29 April 2001 30	Roda JC Kerkrade	1 – 0	Feyenoord	Kerkrade
	Vrede 62'	Report		Stadium: Parkstad Limburg Stadion; Attendance: 15.800; Referee: Wegereef

6 May 2001 31	Feyenoord	2 – 3	Fortuna Sittard	Rotterdam
	Korneev 76', 80'	Report	16' Hamming; 44' van der Hoeven; 83' Volmer	Stadium: Stadion Feijenoord; Attendance: 37.552; Referee: van Dijk

13 May 2001 32	Ajax	3 – 4	Feyenoord	Amsterdam
	Arveladze 13', 18', 85'	Report	7', 66' Connolly; 61' Leonardo; 73' Tomasson	Stadium: Amsterdam ArenA; Attendance: 52.123; Referee: Jol

20 May 2001 33	Feyenoord	2 – 2	FC Utrecht	Rotterdam
	Connolly 24' van Gastel 71' (pen.)	Report	16' Tanghe; 73' Zwaanswijk	Stadium: Stadion Feijenoord; Attendance: 43.285; Referee: Haverkort

27 May 2001 34	RBC Roosendaal	0 – 1	Feyenoord	Roosendaal
		Report	65' Elmander	Stadium: Vast & Goed Stadion; Attendance: 5.000; Referee: van Egmond

== KNVB Cup ==
25 January 2001 1/8 Final	NEC Nijmegen	1 – 2	Feyenoord	De Goffert
			8', 80' Kalou

14 March 2001 1/4 Final	SC Heerenveen	4 – 3	Feyenoord	Abe Lenstra Stadion
			14' Tomasson; 29' Bosvelt; 90'Jochemsen

== UEFA Champions League ==
=== Qualifying phase ===
Third qualifying round

8 August 2000 1st leg	Sturm Graz (Austria)	2 – 1	Feyenoord	Arnold-Schwarzenegger-Stadion, Graz (Austria)
20:30 CEST (UTC+02:00)	Schopp 21' (pen.), 90' (pen.); Strafner (yellow card) 90' (yellow-red card)	Report	7' Korneev; (red card) 90' Cruz	Attendance: 15.100; Referee: (Norway) Hauge

23 August 2000 2nd leg	Feyenoord	1 – 1	(Austria) Sturm Graz	Stadion Feijenoord, Rotterdam (Netherlands)
20:00 CEST (UTC+02:00)	Jochemsen 87'	Report	56' Reinmayr	Attendance: 40.000; Referee: (Spain) Torres

== UEFA Cup ==
14 September 2000 1st Round	Dunaferr FC (Hungary)	0 – 1	Feyenoord	ETO Park, Győr (Hungary)
		Report	60' (Own goal) Molnar	Attendance: 13.000; Referee: (Norway) Skjervold

28 September 2000 1st Round	Feyenoord	3 – 1	(Hungary) Dunaferr FC	Stadion Feijenoord, Rotterdam (Netherlands)
	de Haan 16'; Korneev 47' van Vossen 83'	Report	87' Tokoli	Attendance: 24.000; Referee: (Italy) De Santis

26 October 2000 2nd Round	FC Basel (Switzerland)	1 – 2	Feyenoord	Hardturm, Basel (Switzerland)
	Tchouga 62'	Report	60' Kalou; 84' Bosvelt	Attendance: 9.700; Referee: (Scotland) Rowbotham

9 November 2000 2nd Round	Feyenoord	1 – 0	(Switzerland) FC Basel	Stadion Feijenoord, Rotterdam (Netherlands)
	Kalou 3'	Report		Attendance: 23.600; Referee: (Russia) Baskakov

23 November 2000 1/16 Final	Feyenoord	2 – 2	(Germany) VfB Stuttgart	Stadion Feijenoord, Rotterdam (Netherlands)
	Tomasson 10'; Leonardo 45'	Report	36' Dundee; 76' Ganea	Attendance: 30.000; Referee: (Spain) González

5 December 2000 1/16 Final	VfB Stuttgart (Germany)	2 – 1	Feyenoord	Gottlieb-Daimler-Stadion, Stuttgart (Germany)
	Meißner 29'; Balakov 90' (pen.)	Report	71' Paauwe	Attendance: 15.000; Referee: (Italy) Cesari

== Player details ==
As of 2 October 2018

Appearances (Apps.) numbers are for appearances in competitive games only including sub appearances
Red card numbers denote: Numbers in parentheses represent red cards overturned for wrongful dismissal.

No.	Pos	Nat	Player	Total		Eredivisie		KNVB Cup		Champions League + UEFA cup	
No.	Pos	Nat	Player	Apps	Goals	Apps	Goals	Apps	Goals	Apps	Goals
1	GK	(Poland) POL	Jerzy Dudek	42	0	34	0	0	0	2+6	0
2	DF	(Ghana) GHA	Christian Gyan	18	2	13	2	0	0	2+3	0
3	DF	(Poland) POL	Tomasz Rząsa	24	0	19	0	0	0	2+3	0
4	DF	(Australia) AUS	Stephen Laybutt	0	0	0	0	0	0	0	0
5	MF	(Netherlands) NED	Jean-Paul van Gastel	4	1	4	1	0	0	0	0
6	MF	(Netherlands) NED	Paul Bosvelt	28	10	20	8	0	1	2+6	1
7	FW	(Ivory Coast) CIV	Bonaventure Kalou	33	14	25	10	0	2	2+6	2
8	DF	(Netherlands) NED	Kees van Wonderen	28	1	23	1	0	0	2+3	0
9	FW	(Argentina) ARG	Julio Ricardo Cruz	1	0	0	0	0	0	1	0
9	FW	(Republic of Ireland) IRL	David Connolly	15	5	15	5	0	0	0	0
10	FW	(Denmark) DEN	Jon Dahl Tomasson	39	17	31	15	0	1	2+6	1
11	FW	(Federal Republic of Yugoslavia) YUG	Radoslav Samardžić	0	0	0	0	0	0	0	0
13	DF	(Brazil) BRA	Tininho	21	0	18	0	0	0	3	0
14	FW	(Netherlands) NED	Peter van Vossen	22	1	17	0	0	0	1+4	1
15	FW	(Sweden) SWE	Johan Elmander	16	2	16	2	0	0	0	0
16	MF	(Netherlands) NED	Arco Jochemsen	30	2	23	0	0	1	2+5	1
17	MF	(Netherlands) NED	Patrick Paauwe	33	6	31	6	0	0	2	0
18	FW	(Russia) RUS	Igor Korneev	23	8	17	6	0	0	2+4	1+1
19	MF	(Netherlands) NED	Jan de Visser	17	0	15	0	0	0	1+1	0
20	DF	(Netherlands) NED	Ferry de Haan	40	1	32	0	0	0	2+6	1
21	GK	(Poland) POL	Zbigniew Małkowski	0	0	0	0	0	0	0	0
22	DF	(Netherlands) NED	Ulrich van Gobbel	23	0	19	0	0	0	4	0
23	DF	(Australia) AUS	Brett Emerton	33	2	28	2	0	0	1+4	0
24	FW	(Brazil) BRA	Somália	10	1	7	1	0	0	1+2	0
25	GK	(Netherlands) NED	Cor Varkevisser	0	0	0	0	0	0	0	0
27	DF	(Netherlands) NED	Steve Olfers	0	0	0	0	0	0	0	0
28	FW	(Brazil) BRA	Leonardo	30	3	23	2	0	0	1+6	1
29	MF	(Netherlands) NED	René van Dieren	4	0	3	0	0	0	1	0
30	MF	(Belgium) BEL	Thomas Buffel	0	0	0	0	0	0	0	0
31	FW	(Poland) POL	Ebi Smolarek	26	3	24	3	0	0	2	0

- Source: voetbal.com

Source: (for players, positions, and squad numbers) Feyenoord 1st team squad

== Transfers ==
In: Note: Flags indicate national team as defined under FIFA eligibility rules; some limited exceptions apply. Players may hold more than one non-FIFA nationality.

No.	Pos.	Nation	Player
—	FW	SWE	Johan Elmander (from Orgryte IS (Sweden) )
—	DF	AUS	Brett Emerton (from Sydney Olympic FC (Australia) )
—	MF	NED	Arco Jochemsen (from Vitesse Arnhem (Netherlands) )
—	DF	AUS	Stephen Laybutt (from Brisbane Strikers FC (Australia) )

Out: Note: Flags indicate national team as defined under FIFA eligibility rules; some limited exceptions apply. Players may hold more than one non-FIFA nationality.

No.	Pos.	Nation	Player
—	FW	ARG	Julio Ricardo Cruz (to FC Bologna (Italy) )
—	DF	NED	Bert Konterman (to Rangers F.C. (Scotland) )
—	FW	NED	Robin Nelisse (to AZ Alkmaar (Netherlands) )
—	FW	NED	Ellery Cairo (to FC Twente (Netherlands) )
—	MF	NED	Mohammed Allach (to FC Groningen (Netherlands) )
—	GK	NED	Edwin Zoetebier (to Vitesse Arnhem (Netherlands) )
—	FW	BEL	Thomas Buffel (to SBV Excelsior (Netherlands) - on loan)
—	GK	NED	Ronald Graafland (to SBV Excelsior (Netherlands) )
—	FW	YUG	Radoslav Samardžić (to RKC Waalwijk (Netherlands) - on loan)
—	FW	BRA	Somália (to America FC (Brazil) )
—	DF	NED	Steve Olfers (to SBV Excelsior (Netherlands) )

Source: Feyenoord Transfer overview Voetbal.com
