= Jon Dahl Tomasson =

Danish footballer (born 1976)

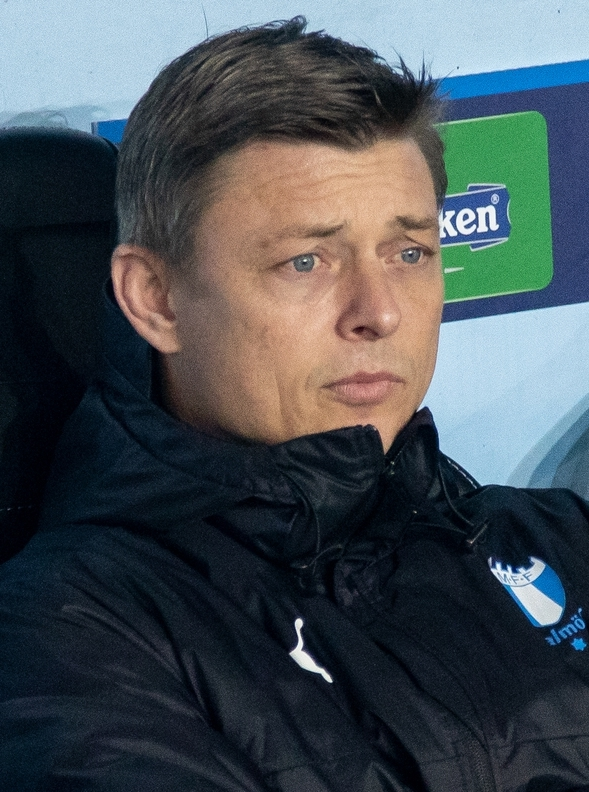
- Tomasson as Malmö manager in 2021

Personal information
- Full name: Jon Dahl Tomasson
- Date of birth: 29 August 1976 (age 50)
- Place of birth: Copenhagen, Denmark
- Height: 1.82 m (6 ft 0 in)
- Positions: Striker; second striker

Youth career
- 1984–1985: Solrød
- 1985–1992: Køge

Senior career*
Years	Team	Apps	(Gls)
1992–1994	Køge	48	(28)
1994–1997	Heerenveen	78	(37)
1997–1998	Newcastle United	23	(3)
1998–2002	Feyenoord	122	(55)
2002–2005	AC Milan	76	(22)
2005–2007	VfB Stuttgart	30	(8)
2007	→ Villarreal (loan)	11	(4)
2007–2008	Villarreal	25	(3)
2008–2011	Feyenoord	37	(20)
Total		450	(180)

International career
1992	Denmark U16	3	(2)
1992	Denmark U17	8	(8)
1993–1995	Denmark U19	16	(12)
1995–1997	Denmark U21	10	(5)
1996	Denmark B	1	(0)
1997–2010	Denmark	112	(52)

Managerial career
- 2013–2014: Excelsior
- 2014: Roda JC
- 2020–2021: Malmö FF
- 2022–2024: Blackburn Rovers
- 2024–2025: Sweden
- * Club domestic league appearances and goals

Jon Dahl Tomasson (Danish pronunciation: [ˈjoːn ˈtæːl ˈtsʰʌmæsʌn]; born 29 August 1976) is a Danish football manager and former player. He was most recently manager of the Sweden national team.

A forward, his most notable run of football came in his first stint at Feyenoord, with whom he won the 2002 UEFA Cup, and Italian club AC Milan, with whom he won the UEFA Champions League in 2003 and reached the final in 2005. He also played top-flight football in England, Germany and Spain. He is the joint all-time top goalscorer for the Denmark national team with 52 goals in 112 games and was also honoured with the Danish Player of the Year award in both 2002 and 2004. He played at the UEFA European Championship in 2000 and 2004 and the FIFA World Cup in 2002 and 2010.

After his playing career, Tomasson went into coaching, being both assistant and manager in the Netherlands, before becoming assistant manager in the Denmark national team under Åge Hareide. In 2020, Tomasson became the manager of Malmö and left two years later after winning the Swedish championship for two consecutive seasons. In June 2022, he was appointed the head coach of Blackburn Rovers. He left Blackburn by mutual consent in February 2024 and later that month was appointed as the new head coach of Sweden. In October 2025, he was dismissed as the head coach of Sweden following poor results in the 2026 World Cup qualifiers.

== Club career ==
=== Early career ===
Born in Copenhagen, son of Bjarne Tomasson and Leila Dahl Petersen, Tomasson first started playing football as a five-year-old in the youth team of Solrød. At nine years of age, he moved to the biggest club in the area, Køge. In November 1992, at 16, he made his senior debut for the club. During the next two years he helped the club to get promoted twice in a row: at the end of the 1993 season, when the club was promoted from the Denmark Series to the second Division; and at the end of the 1994 season, when the club was promoted to the first Division.

=== Heerenveen ===
In December 1994, aged 18, he agreed on a transfer from Køge to the Dutch club Heerenveen, of the Eredivisie. A first-team regular by the 1995–96 season, Tomasson was the club top scorer for the season as well, netting 14 goals in 30 league matches. He increased this tally in the 1996–97 season to 18, and was top-scorer for the club once again. On top of that, he also won the Best Dutch Football Talent of 1996, beating the likes of Boudewijn Zenden and Patrick Kluivert to the prize.

=== Newcastle United ===
His success attracted the interest of other clubs, and he completed a high-profile move to FA Premier League club Newcastle United in July 1997. Newcastle's manager at the time, Kenny Dalglish, saw Tomasson as the perfect link-up player to England national team striker Alan Shearer. The partnership initially worked well, with Tomasson impressing during a pre-season friendly tournament in the Republic of Ireland. However, a career threatening injury to Shearer, combined with the transfer of striker Les Ferdinand to Tottenham Hotspur, meant that Tomasson was moved from his traditional attacking midfield position to that of striker. He struggled to adapt to his new position on the field, and to the English game, due to his lack of physical strength. He scored only four goals in 35 appearances in all competitions during the 1997–98 season.

=== Feyenoord ===
Tomasson returned to the Eredivisie in July 1998, where he joined Feyenoord, once again as an attacking midfielder. The club won the Eredivisie championship for the 1998–99 season, and the Dutch Super Cup. Although Feyenoord did not manage to remain as champions in the following years, they still performed well enough to capture third place in 1999–00, second place in 2000–01, and third place again in 2001–02. In his latter two seasons, Tomasson scored 15 and 17 Eredivisie goals respectively, forming a partnership with Pierre van Hooijdonk, who was 2002's league top scorer with 24 goals.

In 2002, Tomasson was an integral player in the Feyenoord team, that won its first international trophy in 26 years, when the club triumphed in the 2001–02 UEFA Cup tournament. He scored four goals in the tournament and also had an impressive collaboration on the field with striker Pierre van Hooijdonk. During the tournament, they defeated SC Freiburg, Rangers, PSV Eindhoven and Internazionale, before meeting German team Borussia Dortmund in the final. Tomasson scored the goal to 3–1, in a game that ended 3–2 to Feyenoord, and he was subsequently voted man of the match.

=== Milan ===
On 2 May 2002, as Tomasson's contract with Feyenoord was expiring before their UEFA Cup victory, he agreed a move to Italy on a four-year free transfer, to play for Serie A club A.C. Milan. He joined compatriots Martin Laursen and Thomas Helveg at the San Siro club.

The 2002–03 season, Tomasson's first at Milan, saw them winning the Italian Cup. Tomasson was most often used as a late substitute, but did manage to score three goals in the UEFA Champions League; and thereby also held his share of the trophy, when Milan won the prestigious tournament in May 2003. Tomasson missed the final because of an injury that he picked up in the first leg of the 2003 Coppa Italia Final. During the 2003–04 season, Tomasson was given more playing time and managed to score 12 Serie A goals in a title-winning campaign. In August 2004, he was also a part of the Milan team that won the Italian Super Cup, with a 3–0 victory against the Coppa Italia champions Lazio.

For the next 2004–05 season, he struggled to secure a regular starting place in the line-up of Milan. He was once again in the role of substitute, and therefore also scored fewer goals compared to the previous season. At the 2005 UEFA Champions League Final against Liverpool, he was again used by Milan as a late substitute, and when the final had to be decided in penalty shootout, he was selected to kick. Tomasson scored on his attempt, but Milan lost as Serginho, Andrea Pirlo and Andriy Shevchenko missed their shots. When striker Christian Vieri joined the club in July 2005, Tomasson was deemed as potential surplus, and he therefore agreed with Milan to be placed at their transfer list.

Years later, prior to the 2010–11 UEFA Champions League round of 16 match between Chelsea and Copenhagen, former Milan manager Carlo Ancelotti, now manager of Real Madrid, was asked about his view on Danish footballers: "Above all the Danish work ethic surprised me, their special ability to give everything in training. These were very professional and skilled players. The one who performed best and showed the most continuity, was Jon Dahl Tomasson, who always had to fight for playing time against world class strikers. He never had an easy time, but he never gave up and tried to take every chance he got".

=== VfB Stuttgart ===
In July 2005, the German Bundesliga club VfB Stuttgart paid a transfer fee to Milan of €7.5 million, in order to sign Tomasson to a four-year contract. He joined international teammate Jesper Grønkjær at the club but the upcoming 2005–06 season was not successful for either of them. Even though Tomasson was the team's top scorer with eight Bundesliga goals, the team struggled throughout the season to create enough chances and goals, and as a consequence Stuttgart only finished in ninth position of the Bundesliga. After the season, Grønkjær left the club, while Tomasson stayed and in the 2006–07 season Stuttgart became the new champions of the Bundesliga.

=== Villarreal ===
On 24 January 2007, Tomasson was loaned to Villarreal in the Spanish Primera División championship, to cover the place of the injured striker Nihat Kahveci, for the remaining part of the 2006–07 season. When he made his Villarreal debut, in a game against Real Madrid, Tomasson became only the fifth player to have played in the Premier League, Serie A, Bundesliga and Primera División. This rare achievement had previously only been made by the four players: Florin Răducioiu, Gheorghe Popescu, Abel Xavier and Pierre Womé.

His loan contract expired on 1 July 2007, but also featured a buying option, for which Villarreal paid Stuttgart the second half of a total transfer fee at €1 million in order to sign Tomasson to a two-year contract . In the first match of the 2007–08 La Liga season, he scored in a 3–0 victory against Valencia, but he mostly played the club's UEFA Cup games that season, and scored five goals in eight games. The season ended as the best ever for Villarreal, who were runners-up in La Liga.

=== Return to Feyenoord ===
Tomasson agreed with Villarreal in June 2008 to search the market for a possible transfer. The Spanish sportspaper Marca immediately linked him together with Dutch side Feyenoord. This was at first described by Tomasson as pure speculation. The speculation, however, turned out to be true. In July 2008, he left Villarreal on a free transfer, and returned to Feyenoord on a new three-year contract. He made a fine start with four goals in three games. But this was followed by an injury from the end of September until the end of January, which meant he could only play a total of 14 games for Feyenoord in 2008–09.

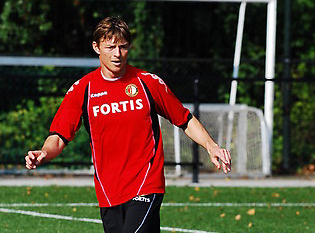
Tomasson training with Feyenoord in August 2008

In the next 2009–10 season, he again had to battle with a couple of injuries. But during the season he was still able to play another 28 games for Feyenoord, where he scored a club-best 12 goals. With his good performance on the field, he helped Feyenoord to achieve a fourth place in the Eredivisie, and help the club to reach the final of the Dutch Cup. The final was played over two legs, and Feyenoord lost 6–1 on aggregate to Ajax, with Tomasson scoring the only goal for Feyenoord. During the 2010 World Cup, he was hit by another serious injury, that spoiled his first half of the 2010–11 season for Feyenoord. According to the medical staff at Feyenoord, the injury was a lot worse than original thought. When they tried to get him ready for a game at 15 August, the injury had not entirely healed; and after a too hard training session, it therefore reappeared at its previous strength. Based upon further examination of the injury, the coach now feared that Tomasson only would be ready to play his first game of the season in January 2011.

== International career ==
Tomasson scored 10 goals in 16 games for the national under-19 team, and was awarded 1994 Danish U-19 Player of the Year. In all, he scored 27 goals in 37 matches for various national youth selections.

After two good seasons with Heerenveen, Tomasson got a call-up to the Denmark national team, and he made his debut on 29 March 1997, against Croatia. During his time at Newcastle, reduced playing time saw Tomasson dropped by the Denmark national team, and he was not selected to play at the 1998 FIFA World Cup. When he moved to Feyenoord, Tomasson was once more called up for the Denmark national team in August 1998, and with six goals in seven matches of the Euro 2000 qualification, he quickly became an important part of the Danish team, playing as an attacking midfielder behind striker Ebbe Sand. He played in all Denmark's three matches at the main Euro 2000 tournament, but did not score as Denmark were eliminated in the group stage. Before moving to Milan, he played for Denmark in the 2002 FIFA World Cup, where he scored four goals in as many games.

Tomasson played for Denmark at Euro 2004, where he scored three goals in four games and was selected for the Euro 2004 Team of the Tournament. On 28 May 2010, Denmark coach Morten Olsen announced that the player would be part of the final squad of 23 participating in the 2010 FIFA World Cup in South Africa. On 24 June, he scored against Japan in a 3–1 defeat as Denmark went out of the competition. He was rated by FIFA as the best Danish player of the tournament.

Tomasson scored a total of 52 goals in 112 games for Denmark throughout his career, which spanned from March 1997 to June 2010, making him joint all time goal scorer of the Denmark national team with Poul Nielsen. He played at Euro 2000, the 2002 World Cup, Euro 2004 and the 2010 World Cup. On 9 August 2010, Tomasson announced his retirement from the national team.

== Coaching career ==
=== Early coaching career ===
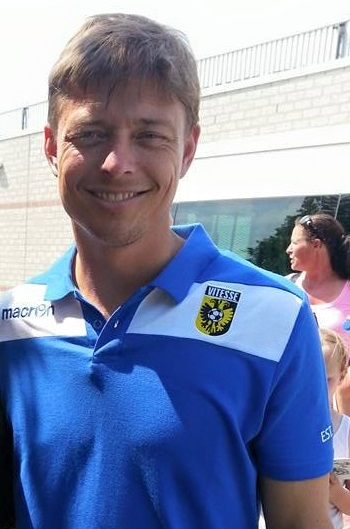
Tomasson with Vitesse in 2016

Tomasson retired on 6 June 2011, and became assistant coach at Dutch club Excelsior. He became the club's head coach at the beginning of the 2013–14 season. His debut was a 2–2 Eerste Divisie draw at home to Helmond Sport, and he took the Rotterdam-based team to the last 16 of the KNVB Cup before losing 2–1 at home to PEC Zwolle on 17 December.

Eredivisie side Roda JC sacked their head coach Ruud Brood on 15 December 2013, and signed Tomasson eleven days later, on a 3 1/2-year deal, effective 3 January. He made his debut 15 days later in a 2–2 draw at his former club Heerenveen. After the second half of the season, which resulted in relegation, he was dismissed on 26 May 2014.

On 19 June 2015, Tomasson was appointed as the new assistant manager of Vitesse. On 7 March 2016, he was appointed as an assistant coach of the Danish national team. During a 3 1/2-year tenure, he helped the Danish national team qualify for the 2018 FIFA World Cup and the 2020 UEFA European Championship. The team did not lose a game for three years.

=== Malmö ===
On 5 January 2020, Tomasson was appointed as the new manager of Swedish Allsvenskan side Malmö. He led the team to the 2020 Allsvenskan title in his first season with the club, winning Malmö its 21st Swedish Championship.

In his second season with Malmö, he took the club to the group stage of Champions League after succeeding in four qualification rounds, including beating Rangers in the third round and Ludogorets Razgrad in the fourth. In December 2021, Tomasson and Malmö won their second consecutive Allsvenskan league title. On 30 December, he left by his own request.

=== Blackburn Rovers ===
On 14 June 2022, Tomasson was appointed as the new head coach of Blackburn Rovers. He signed a three-year deal at the club, stating: "I'm really proud and excited to be taking over as head coach of Blackburn Rovers – a club with a lot of tradition and also great ambition." In the club's first Championship match of the 2022–23 season, Blackburn won 1–0 at home to Queens Park Rangers with a long-range goal from Lewis Travis. Blackburn finished in 7th place in Tomasson's first season at the club, narrowly missing out on the playoffs for promotion to the Premier League due to goal difference. Tomasson left Blackburn by mutual consent in February 2024, being replaced as head coach by John Eustace.

=== Sweden ===
On 26 February 2024, Tomasson was named as the new head coach of Sweden national team, replacing Janne Andersson. This resulted in Tomasson becoming the first non-Swede to coach the national team since the creation of this role.

On 14 October 2025, Tomasson was dismissed as head coach following a 1–0 loss to Kosovo in the 2026 World Cup qualifiers. The Swedish Football Association cited unsatisfactory results, with Sweden having collected only one point from their first four qualifying matches.

== Personal life ==
Tomasson has two sons, Luca (born in 2008) and Liam (born in 2012), with his Danish wife Line Dahl Kongeskov Tomasson. He lives with his family in the Netherlands.

Tomasson is of Danish, Finnish and Icelandic heritage.

== Style of play ==
Tomasson was known for his positional strength and fine finishing as a forward, despite his lack of notable pace or physicality. He also drew praise from pundits and managers for his discipline in training, and for his work-rate and movement off the ball, as well as his ability to create space for his teammates with his runs. A versatile player, he was capable of playing both as a striker and as a second striker.

== Career statistics ==
=== Club ===
Appearances and goals by club, season and competition
Club	Season	League			National cup (Note: Includes Danish Cup, KNVB Cup, FA Cup, Coppa Italia, DFB-Pokal)		League cup (Note: Includes Football League Cup, DFL-Ligapokal)		Continental		Other		Total	
Club	Season	Division	Apps	Goals	Apps	Goals	Apps	Goals	Apps	Goals	Apps	Goals	Apps	Goals
Køge	1991–92	Danish 2nd Division	2	0	0	0	–		–		–		2	0
Køge	1992–93	Denmark Series	15	5	5	5	–		–		–		20	10
Køge	1993–94	Danish 2nd Division	31	23	2	4	–		–		–		33	27
Køge	Total		48	28	7	9	0	0	0	0	0	0	55	37
Heerenveen	1994–95	Eredivisie	16	5	2	1	–		–		–		18	6
Heerenveen	1995–96	Eredivisie	30	14	1	0	–		–		–		31	14
Heerenveen	1996–97	Eredivisie	32	18	6	6	–		–		–		38	24
Heerenveen	Total		78	37	9	7	0	0	0	0	0	0	87	44
Newcastle United	1997–98	Premier League	23	3	2	0	3	1	7 (Note: Appearances in UEFA Champions League)	0	–		35	4
Feyenoord	1998–99	Eredivisie	33	13	3	1	–		2 (Note: Appearances in UEFA Cup)	2	–		38	16
Feyenoord	1999–00	Eredivisie	28	10	1	0	–		11	4	1 (Note: Appearance in Johan Cruyff Shield)	1	40	14
Feyenoord	2000–01	Eredivisie	31	15	2	1	–		2	1	–		35	17
Feyenoord	2001–02	Eredivisie	30	17	1	1	–		7	4	–		38	22
Feyenoord	Total		122	55	7	3	0	0	22	11	1	1	152	70
AC Milan	2002–03	Serie A	29	4	7	4	–		11	3	–		37	11
AC Milan	2003–04	Serie A	26	12	4	2	–		6	0	1 (Note: Appearance in Intercontinental Cup)	1	37	15
AC Milan	2004–05	Serie A	30	6	3	2	–		6	1	1 (Note: Appearance in Supercoppa Italiana)	0	40	9
AC Milan	Total		75	22	14	8	0	0	23	4	2	1	114	35
VfB Stuttgart	2005–06	Bundesliga	26	8	2	1	3	0	6	2	–		37	11
VfB Stuttgart	2006–07	Bundesliga	4	0	2	1	0	0	0	0	–		6	1
VfB Stuttgart	Total		30	8	4	2	3	0	6	2	0	0	43	12
Villarreal (loan)	2006–07	La Liga	11	4	0	0	–		0	0	–		11	4
Villarreal	2007–08	La Liga	25	3	4	0	–		8	5	–		37	8
Feyenoord	2008–09	Eredivisie	13	9	0	0	–		1	0	2 (Note: Appearances in Eredivisie Europa League play-offs)	1	16	10
Feyenoord	2009–10	Eredivisie	24	11	4	1	–		0	0	–		28	12
Feyenoord	2010–11	Eredivisie	0	0	0	0	–		0	0	–		0	0
Feyenoord	Total		37	20	4	1	0	0	1	0	2	1	44	22
Career total			449	180	51	30	6	1	67	23	5	2	578	236

=== International ===
Appearances and goals by national team and year
National team	Year	Apps	Goals
Denmark	1997	4	0
Denmark	1998	3	0
Denmark	1999	8	6
Denmark	2000	11	3
Denmark	2001	9	4
Denmark	2002	12	10
Denmark	2003	8	4
Denmark	2004	14	8
Denmark	2005	10	3
Denmark	2006	6	5
Denmark	2007	11	7
Denmark	2008	6	1
Denmark	2009	5	0
Denmark	2010	5	1
Total		112	52

Scores and results list Denmark's goal tally first, score column indicates score after each Tomasson goal.

List of international goals scored by Jon Dahl Tomasson
No.	Date	Venue	Cap	Opponent	Score	Result	Competition	Ref.
1	9 June 1999	Anfield, Liverpool, England	9	Wales	1–0	2–0	UEFA Euro 2000 qualifying	
2	4 September 1999	Parken Stadium, Copenhagen, Denmark	11	Switzerland	2–1	2–1	UEFA Euro 2000 qualifying	
3	8 September 1999	Stadio San Paolo, Naples, Italy	12	Italy	3–2	3–2	UEFA Euro 2000 qualifying	
4	13 November 1999	Ramat Gan Stadium, Ramat Gan, Israel	14	Israel	1–0	5–0	UEFA Euro 2000 qualifying	
5	13 November 1999	Ramat Gan Stadium, Ramat Gan, Israel	14	Israel	2–0	5–0	UEFA Euro 2000 qualifying	
6	17 November 1999	Parken Stadium, Copenhagen, Denmark	15	Israel	3–0	3–0	UEFA Euro 2000 qualifying	
7	29 March 2000	Leiria, Portugal	16	Portugal	1–0	1–2	Friendly	
8	3 June 2000	Parken Stadium, Copenhagen, Denmark	18	Belgium	1–0	2–2	Friendly	
9	2 September 2000	Laugardalsvöllur, Reykjavík, Iceland	23	Iceland	1–1	2–1	2002 FIFA World Cup qualification	
10	25 April 2001	Parken Stadium, Copenhagen, Denmark	28	Slovenia	2–0	3–0	Friendly	
11	2 June 2001	Parken Stadium, Copenhagen, Denmark	29	Czech Republic	2–1	2–1	2002 FIFA World Cup qualification	
12	5 September 2001	Stadion Balgarska Armia, Sofia, Bulgaria	33	Bulgaria	1–0	2–0	2002 FIFA World Cup qualification	
13	5 September 2001	Stadion Balgarska Armia, Sofia, Bulgaria	33	Bulgaria	2–0	2–0	2002 FIFA World Cup qualification	
14	17 April 2002	Parken Stadium, Copenhagen, Denmark	37	Israel	2–0	3–1	Friendly	
15	17 May 2002	Parken Stadium, Copenhagen, Denmark	38	Cameroon	2–0	2–1	Friendly	
16	1 June 2002	Ulsan Munsu Football Stadium, Ulsan, South Korea	40	Uruguay	1–0	2–1	2002 FIFA World Cup	
17	1 June 2002	Ulsan Munsu Football Stadium, Ulsan, South Korea	40	Uruguay	2–1	2–1	2002 FIFA World Cup	
18	6 June 2002	Daegu World Cup Stadium, Daegu, South Korea	41	Senegal	1–0	1–1	2002 FIFA World Cup	
19	11 June 2002	Incheon World Cup Stadium, Incheon, South Korea	42	France	2–0	2–0	2002 FIFA World Cup	
20	7 September 2002	Ullevaal Stadion, Oslo, Norway	45	Norway	1–0	2–2	UEFA Euro 2004 qualifying	
21	7 September 2002	Ullevaal Stadion, Oslo, Norway	45	Norway	2–1	2–2	UEFA Euro 2004 qualifying	
22	12 October 2002	Parken Stadium, Copenhagen, Denmark	46	Luxembourg	1–0	2–0	UEFA Euro 2004 qualifying	
23	20 November 2002	Parken Stadium, Copenhagen, Denmark	47	Poland	1–0	2–0	Friendly	
24	12 February 2003	Cairo International Stadium, Cairo, Egypt	48	Egypt	2–1	4–1	Friendly	
25	29 March 2003	Arena Națională, Bucharest, Romania	49	Romania	3–2	5–2	UEFA Euro 2004 qualifying	
26	10 September 2003	Parken Stadium, Copenhagen, Denmark	53	Romania	1–0	2–2	UEFA Euro 2004 qualifying	
27	16 November 2003	Old Trafford, Manchester, England	55	England	–	3–2	Friendly	
28	30 May 2004	Lilleküla Stadium, Tallinn, Estonia	59	Estonia	1–0	2–2	Friendly	
29	18 June 2004	Estádio Municipal de Braga, Braga, Portugal	62	Bulgaria	1–0	2–0	UEFA Euro 2004	
30	22 June 2004	Estádio do Bessa, Porto, Portugal	63	Sweden	1–0	2–2	UEFA Euro 2004	
31	22 June 2004	Estádio do Bessa, Porto, Portugal	63	Sweden	2–1	2–2	UEFA Euro 2004	
32	9 October 2004	Arena Kombëtare, Tirana, Albania	67	Albania	2–0	2–0	2006 FIFA World Cup qualification	
33	13 October 2004	Parken Stadium, Copenhagen, Denmark	68	Turkey	1–0	1–1	2006 FIFA World Cup qualification	
34	17 November 2004	Lokomotivi Stadium, Tbilisi, Georgia	69	Georgia	1–0	2–2	2006 FIFA World Cup qualification	
35	17 November 2004	Lokomotivi Stadium, Tbilisi, Georgia	69	Georgia	2–1	2–2	2006 FIFA World Cup qualification	
36	17 August 2005	Parken Stadium, Copenhagen, Denmark	75	England	2–0	4–1	Friendly	
37	7 September 2005	Parken Stadium, Copenhagen, Denmark	77	Georgia	4–1	6–1	2006 FIFA World Cup qualification	
38	12 October 2005	Almaty Central Stadium, Almaty, Kazakhstan	79	Kazakhstan	2–0	2–1	2006 FIFA World Cup qualification	
39	27 May 2006	Aarhus Stadium, Aarhus, Denmark	80	Paraguay	1–1	1–1	Friendly	
40	1 September 2006	Brøndby Stadium, Brøndbyvester, Denmark	82	Portugal	1–0	4–2	Friendly	
41	6 September 2006	Laugardalsvöllur, Reykjavík, Iceland	83	Iceland	2–0	2–0	UEFA Euro 2008 qualifying	
42	11 October 2006	Rheinpark Stadion, Vaduz, Liechtenstein	85	Liechtenstein	3–0	4–0	UEFA Euro 2008 qualifying	
43	11 October 2006	Rheinpark Stadion, Vaduz, Liechtenstein	85	Liechtenstein	4–0	4–0	UEFA Euro 2008 qualifying	
44	6 February 2007	Loftus Road, London, England	86	Australia	1–0	3–1	Friendly	
45	6 February 2007	Loftus Road, London, England	86	Australia	3–0	3–1	Friendly	
46	2 June 2007	Parken Stadium, Copenhagen, Denmark	89	Sweden	2–3	0–3 (Note: Match abandoned)	UEFA Euro 2008 qualifying	
47	12 September 2007	Aarhus Stadium, Aarhus, Denmark	93	Liechtenstein	3–0	4–0	UEFA Euro 2008 qualifying	
48	13 October 2007	Aarhus Stadium, Aarhus, Denmark	94	Spain	1–2	1–3	UEFA Euro 2008 qualifying	
49	17 October 2007	Parken Stadium, Copenhagen, Denmark	95	Latvia	1–0	3–1	UEFA Euro 2008 qualifying	
50	21 November 2007	Parken Stadium, Copenhagen, Denmark	96	Iceland	2–0	3–0	UEFA Euro 2008 qualifying	
51	6 February 2008	Nova Gorica Sports Park, Nova Gorica, Slovenia	97	Slovenia	1–0	2–1	Friendly	
52	24 June 2010	Royal Bafokeng Stadium, Phokeng, South Africa	112	Japan	1–2	1–3	2010 FIFA World Cup	

=== Managerial statistics ===
As of match played 13 October 2025

Team	From	To	Record								
Team	From	To	G	W	D	L	GF	GA	GD	Win %	Ref.
Excelsior	17 June 2013	3 January 2014	25	10	9	6	37	29	+8	40.00	
Roda JC	3 January 2014	26 May 2014	17	3	2	12	14	30	−16	17.65	
Malmö	5 January 2020	30 December 2021	93	52	21	20	187	104	+83	55.91	
Blackburn Rovers	14 June 2022	9 February 2024	90	40	14	36	137	132	+5	44.44	
Sweden	1 March 2024	14 October 2025	18	9	2	7	36	26	+10	50.00	
Total			243	114	48	81	411	321	+90	46.91	—

== Honours ==
=== Player ===
Feyenoord

- Eredivisie: 1998–99
- Johan Cruijff Shield: 1999
- UEFA Cup: 2001–02

AC Milan

- Serie A: 2003–04
- Coppa Italia: 2002–03
- Supercoppa Italiana: 2004
- UEFA Champions League: 2002–03
- UEFA Super Cup: 2003

Individual

- 1994 Danish U19 Player of the Year
- 1996 Dutch Football Talent of the Year
- 2002 World Cup Bronze shoe (4 goals)
- 2002 Danish Player of the Year
- 2004 UEFA Euro All-Star Team
- 2004 Danish Player of the Year
- 1994 top-scorer of the Danish 2nd Division (23 goals) and Køge BK (27 goals)
- 1995–96 top-scorer of SC Heerenveen (14 goals)
- 1996–97 top-scorer of SC Heerenveen (24 goals)
- 2000–01 top-scorer of Feyenoord (17 goals)
- 2005–06 top-scorer of VfB Stuttgart (11 goals)
- 2009–10 top-scorer of Feyenoord (12 goals)

=== Manager ===
Malmö

- Allsvenskan: 2020, 2021
- Allsvenskan Manager of the Year: 2020

== See also ==
- List of top international men's football goalscorers by country
- List of men's footballers with 100 or more international caps
- List of men's footballers with 50 or more international goals
- List of FIFA World Cup top goalscorers

Sporting positions
Preceded by René Henriksen	Denmark captain 2004–2010	Succeeded by Christian Poulsen
