= Peter Elmander =

Swedish footballer

Personal information
- Full name: Peter Elmander
- Date of birth: 25 April 1985 (age 41)
- Place of birth: Alingsås, Sweden
- Height: 5 ft 10 in (1.78 m)
- Positions: Winger; striker

Team information
- Current team: Qviding FIF

Senior career*
Years	Team	Apps	(Gls)
2003–2006	Holmalunds IF		
2007–	Qviding FIF		
- * Club domestic league appearances and goals

Peter Elmander is a Swedish football player born on 25 April 1985.

He is the youngest of the three Elmander brothers. His brothers Patrik and Johan are both professional football players.

From 2003 to 2006 he played for Holmalunds IF, just like both of his brothers. Peter had the opportunity to play with his older brother Patrik for a few seasons. In 2003 during a game against Örgryte IS, Elmander endured a nasty blow in which sidelined him until 2005. In 2007, he was traded to Qviding FIF where he continues to play.
