= 1999 Johan Cruyff Shield =

Johan Cruijff Schaal IV
Feyenoord	Ajax
3	2
- Date: 8 August 1999
- Venue: Amsterdam Arena, Amsterdam
- Referee: Roelof Luinge
- Attendance: 50,000

The fourth edition of the Johan Cruyff Shield (Dutch: Johan Cruijff Schaal) was held on 8 August 1999 between 1998–99 Eredivisie champions Feyenoord and 1998–99 KNVB Cup winners Ajax. Feyenoord won the match 3–2.

== Match ==
=== Details ===
8 August 1999

Feyenoord	3–2	Ajax
Tomasson 13'; Kalou 15'; Paauwe 86'		Knopper 45'; Grønkjær 53'

Amsterdam Arena, Amsterdam
Attendance: 50,000
Referee: Roelof Luinge

Feyenoord	Ajax

GK	1	(Poland) Jerzy Dudek
RB	22	(Netherlands) Ulrich van Gobbel
CB	16	(Netherlands) Bert Konterman (c)
CB	17	(Netherlands) Patrick Paauwe
LB	3	(Poland) Tomasz Rząsa
CM	2	(Ghana) Christian Gyan
CM	19	(Netherlands) Jan de Visser
AM	10	(Denmark) Jon Dahl Tomasson		(substituted off) 65'
RW	7	(Ivory Coast) Bonaventure Kalou	(yellow card) 54'	(substituted off) 87'
CF	9	(Argentina) Julio Cruz
LW	14	(Netherlands) Peter van Vossen	(yellow card) 26'	(substituted off) 65'
Substitutes:
FW	30	(Netherlands) Ellery Cairo		(substituted in) 65'
MF	13	(Brazil) Tininho		(substituted in) 65'
MF	5	(Netherlands) Jean-Paul van Gastel		(substituted in) 87'
Manager:
(Netherlands) Leo Beenhakker

GK	1	(Netherlands) Fred Grim
RB	16	(Netherlands) John Nieuwenburg
CB	4	(Netherlands) Jan van Halst		(substituted off) 46'
CB	5	(Netherlands) Frank Verlaat
LB	30	(Netherlands) Mitchell Piqué	(yellow card) 90'
CM	13	(Netherlands) Richard Knopper
CM	6	(Netherlands) Aron Winter (c)
CM	8	(Netherlands) Richard Witschge
RW	10	(Denmark) Brian Laudrup		(substituted off) 85'
CF	9	(Greece) Nikos Machlas
LW	11	(Denmark) Jesper Grønkjær		(substituted off) 82'
Substitutes:
MF	14	(Portugal) Dani		(substituted in) 46'
FW	24	(Georgia (country)) Shota Arveladze		(substituted in) 82'
FW	7	(Brazil) Wamberto		(substituted in) 85'
Manager:
(Netherlands) Jan Wouters
