= Patrik Elmander =

Swedish football player

Personal information
- Full name: Patrik Elmander
- Date of birth: 26 November 1978 (age 47)
- Place of birth: Alingsås, Sweden
- Height: 6 ft 0 in (1.83 m)
- Position: Striker

Youth career
- Holmalunds IF

Senior career*
Years	Team	Apps	(Gls)
2001–2002	Örgryte IS	27	(4)
2004–2005	GAIS	47	(13)
2006–2007	→ Jönköpings Södra IF	55	(25)
2008–2009	→ Örgryte IS	2	(1)
- * Club domestic league appearances and goals as of 19 April 2008 (UTC)

Patrik Elmander (born 26 November 1978) is a Swedish football player.

Born in Alingsås, Sweden, he is the oldest of the Elmander brothers. His two younger brothers are Johan Elmander and Peter Elmander. He started his youth career at Holmalunds IF. During his career, he has played for Örgryte IS, Kalmar FF, Raufoss (Norway), Gais and Jönköping Södra IF. In 2004, Elmander had the opportunity to play alongside his younger brother Peter during his stay with GAIS.

Elmander cancelled his contract with Örgryte in the summer of 2009. He then continued his career in 2011 in Alingsås IF, then Holmalunds IF in Division 3.
