= Johan Elmander =

Swedish footballer (born 1981)

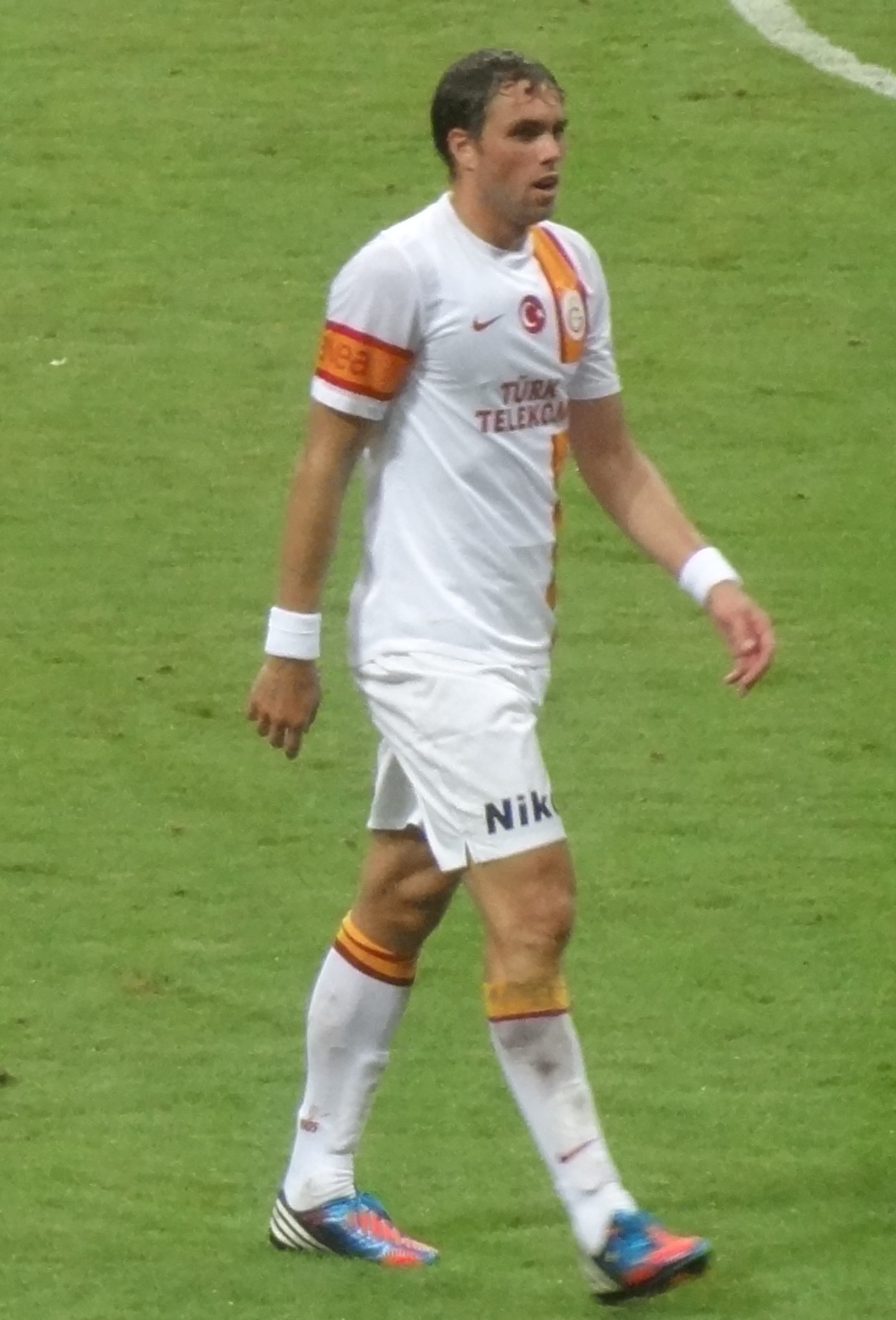
- Elmander playing for Galatasaray in 2012

Personal information
- Full name: Johan Erik Calvin Elmander
- Date of birth: 27 May 1981 (age 45)
- Place of birth: Alingsås, Sweden
- Height: 1.88 m (6 ft 2 in)
- Position: Striker

Senior career*
| Years | Team | Apps | (Gls) |
| 1997–1998 | Holmalunds IF | 23 | (5) |
| 1999–2000 | Örgryte IS | 39 | (4) |
| 2000–2004 | Feyenoord | 39 | (3) |
| 2002–2003 | → Djurgårdens IF (loan) | 19 | (12) |
| 2003–2004 | → NAC Breda (loan) | 31 | (7) |
| 2004–2006 | Brøndby IF | 58 | (22) |
| 2006–2008 | Toulouse | 64 | (22) |
| 2008–2011 | Bolton Wanderers | 92 | (18) |
| 2011–2014 | Galatasaray | 52 | (16) |
| 2013–2014 | → Norwich City (loan) | 28 | (1) |
| 2014–2016 | Brøndby IF | 48 | (6) |
| 2017 | Örgryte IS | 23 | (4) |
| Total | | 490 | (116) |

International career
| 1997–1998 | Sweden U16 | 27 | (3) |
| 1999 | Sweden U18 | 7 | (1) |
| 2000–2004 | Sweden U21 | 30 | (12) |
| 2002–2015 | Sweden | 85 | (20) |
- * Club domestic league appearances and goals

Johan Erik Calvin Elmander (Swedish pronunciation: [ˈjûːan ɛlˈmǎnːdɛr]; born 27 May 1981) is a Swedish former professional footballer who played as a striker. Beginning his career with Holmalunds IF in the late 1990s, he went on to play professionally in the Netherlands, Sweden, Denmark, France, England, and Turkey before retiring at Örgryte IS in 2017. A full international between 2002 and 2015, he scored 20 goals in 85 games for the Sweden national team, and represented his country at the 2006 FIFA World Cup, UEFA Euro 2008 and UEFA Euro 2012.

In 2011, his goal for Bolton Wanderers, away to Wolverhampton Wanderers during the 2010–11 season, was voted the greatest Premier League goal ever in a poll by The Guardian.

== Club career ==
=== Early career ===
Elmander was born in Alingsås, Alingsås Municipality. He started his career as a striker for Swedish clubs but changed to a centre midfielder Holmalunds IF and Örgryte, before making the move to Dutch club Feyenoord at the age of 18, where he continued to be used as a midfielder. Although never a first team regular, he came on as a substitute in the 2002 UEFA Cup Final 3–2 win against Borussia Dortmund.

Elmander was subsequently put on loan back in Sweden with Djurgården, where he won the double of both Allsvenskan championship and Swedish Cup title in 2002 and Allsvenskan in 2003, however he wasn't awarded a medal as he had played too few matches. He debuted for the Sweden national team, in a February 2002 friendly match against Greece. In 2003, he was loaned out to Feyenoord's Dutch league rivals NAC Breda.

=== Brøndby IF ===
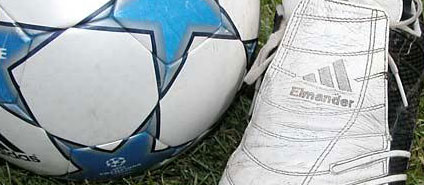
Elmander's personalized boot at Brøndby

Before the 2004–05 season, he was bought by Danish Superliga outfit Brøndby. Despite not scoring as many goals for the club as was expected, he was the playmaker and creative spark of the Brøndby team in the 2004–05 Superliga season, playing mainly as the free-roaming forward behind the sole striker in manager Michael Laudrup's 4–3–3 formation. The team won the double of both the Danish Superliga and the Danish Cup title, and Elmander was voted Brøndby's Player of the Year.

In his two seasons at Brøndby, Elmander scored 22 goals in 58 Danish Superliga games, attracting the attention of several clubs throughout Europe. He was called up to represent Sweden at the 2006 World Cup, where he played two games. Elmander signed a four-year contract with French side Toulouse for an undisclosed fee of around €4,500,000 on 7 July 2006.

=== Toulouse ===
Elmander scored 11 goals in his first season with Toulouse and was nominated as player of the year by his fellow players; the award ultimately went to Lyon winger Florent Malouda. The season was very successful, with Elmander helping lead Toulouse to a third-place finish and a berth in the qualifying rounds of UEFA Champions League. The second season, much like that of his team, was much more irregular, and though he scored the same number of goals as he did the previous season, he was less decisive.

=== Bolton Wanderers ===
On 27 June 2008, Elmander completed a move to Premier League club Bolton Wanderers for an £8.2 million fee, the club's record signing, with the deal including Daniel Braaten moving to Toulouse. Elmander signed a three-year deal, wearing the number 9 shirt by manager Gary Megson.

Elmander's first Premier League goal, a header, came on his competitive debut, against Stoke City on 16 August 2008 in a 3–1 win. Elmander played 30 games in the 2008–09 season, scoring five goals and creating two assists.

From December 2008 to September 2009, Elmander went on a nine-month goal drought, which ended during the League Cup fixture against West Ham United as he scored in extra-time. His first league goal in 11 months came in a 5–1 defeat to Aston Villa.

Elmander finally found his goalscoring form in the 2010–11 season, scoring six goals in the opening 13 games, all away from the Reebok Stadium. His first home goals of the season came against Newcastle United, giving him a joint lead as top scorer in the Premier League. However, his goalscoring form dipped and he scored just three goals between December and a goal on 12 March against Birmingham City in an FA Cup Sixth round tie. This brought his goal tally for all competitions to eleven for the season.

Bolton manager Owen Coyle said in an interview on 20 May that he expected Elmander to join Galatasaray, and Elmander confirmed later in the month that he would be leaving the club.

In total, Elmander made 92 appearances in the Premier League, scoring 18 goals; 11 appearances in the FA Cup, scoring three goals; and five appearances in the League Cup, scoring once.

=== Galatasaray ===
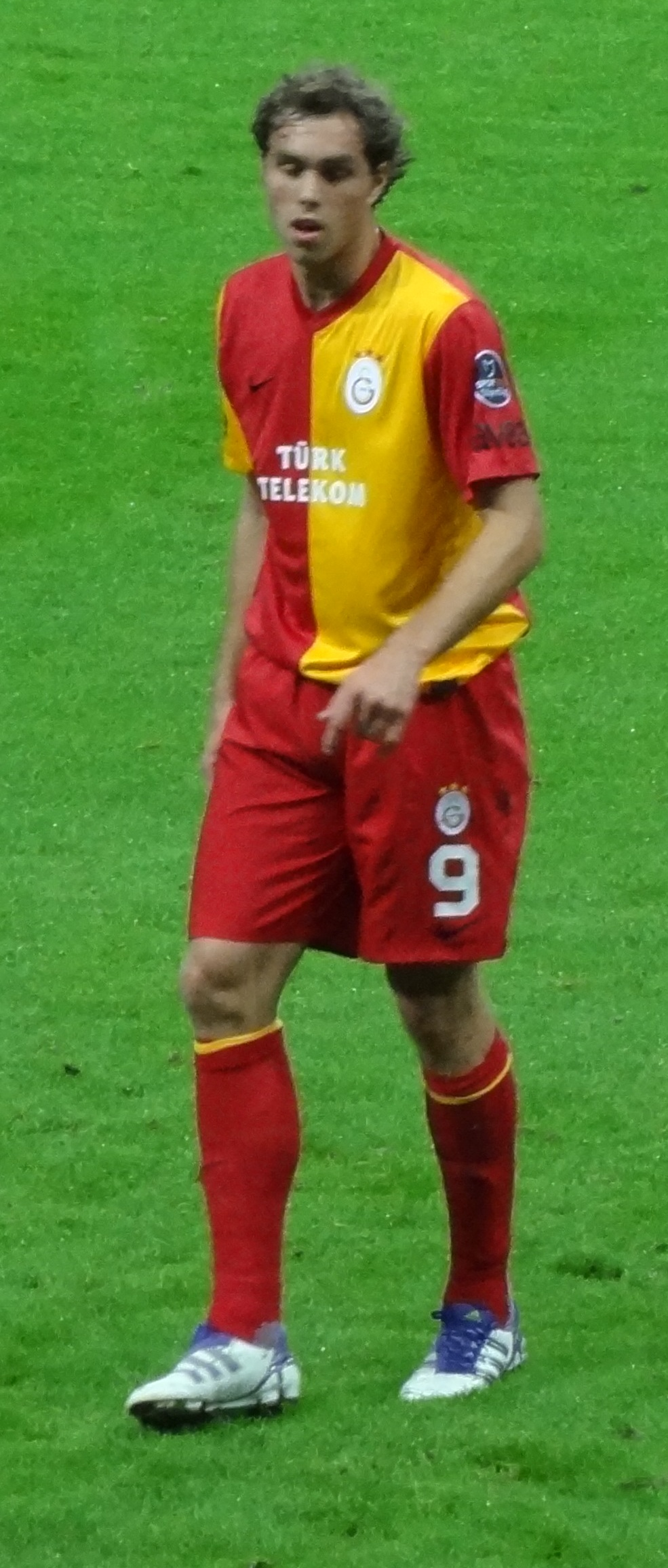
Elmander in a September 2011 match against Eskişehirspor

On 27 May 2011, Elmander arrived in Turkey on his birthday, and on 30 May 2011, Elmander joined Galatasaray in a three-year deal on a free transfer after his contract expired at Bolton in the same month. He debuted on the second week of the Süper Lig season, coming on in the 61st minute and scored his first goal in a 3–1 home win over Samsunspor on 18 September. Due to his great performance, Galatasaray coach Fatih Terim changed the team's formation to a 4–4–2, allowing Elmander to play together with fellow striker Milan Baroš simultaneously. On 26 February 2012, he scored the opening and the winning goal of the game against Beşiktaş in a 3–2 win, and also scored goals in all derby matches, including against Fenerbahçe and Trabzonspor. He scored 12 goals in 36 league matches in a season which saw Galatasaray crowned league champions.

Elmander began the 2012–13 season in a match against Kasımpaşa and scored his first goal of the season in a 3–3 draw with Beşiktaş the following week. In the league's fourth week, he scored the opener against Antalyaspor in a 4–0 away win for Galatasaray. and on 19 October 2012, he scored an amazing goal against Gençlerbirliği in a 3–3 away draw and maintained the lead of the Süper Lig. He left in August 2013 to join Premier League side Norwich City on a season-long loan.

==== Loan to Norwich City ====
Elmander returned to England, joining Norwich on a season-long loan. He made his debut for Norwich against Hull City and scored his first two goals for the club against Bury in the League Cup on 27 August 2013. His first league start came against Southampton on 31 August 2013. Elmander scored his first league goal against Southampton in a 4–2 away loss for the Canaries on 15 March 2014. Elmander failed to impress during his loan spell at Norwich, though he did win the hearts of many fans with his hard-working performances and eagerness to play.

=== Return to Brøndby ===
On 24 June 2014, Elmander returned to Brøndby in Denmark on a free transfer, signing a two-year contract after his contract with Galatasaray had expired. He was handed the number 11 shirt on his return to the club.

=== Return to Örgryte and retirement ===
Elmander spent his last season as a professional footballer at Örgryte, scoring 5 goals in 25 appearances in all competitions.

== International career ==
Elmander represented Sweden at the 2006 FIFA World Cup, UEFA Euro 2008, and UEFA Euro 2012. He retired from the national team in November 2015, having won 85 caps and scored 20 goals.

== Personal life ==
Elmander has two brothers Peter and Patrik who also are former professional footballers.

Elmander was married on 27 December 2007 to highschool sweetheart Amanda Calvin in a lavish ceremony in her home town of Hemsjö, Sweden. The couple had over 200 guests including fellow former teammates Kim Källström and Jon Jönsson. At their wedding, singer and 2007 Idol contestant Christoffer Hiding performed. In August 2008, the couple announced the birth of their first child. On 18 November 2010, it was announced Elmander's wife had given birth to a baby girl named Lily.

== Career statistics ==
=== Club ===
Appearances and goals by club, season and competition
| Club | Season | League | | | National cup (Note: Includes Svenska Cupen, KNVB Cup, Danish Cup, Coupe de France, FA Cup, Turkish Cup) | | League cup (Note: Includes Coupe de la Ligue, Football League Cup) | | Europe | | Other | | Total | |
| Club | Season | Division | Apps | Goals | Apps | Goals | Apps | Goals | Apps | Goals | Apps | Goals | Apps | Goals |
|---|---|---|---|---|---|---|---|---|---|---|---|---|---|---|
| Holmalund | 1997 | Division 2 Västra Götaland | 4 | 0 | — | | — | | — | | — | | 4 | 0 |
| Holmalund | 1998 | Division 2 Västra Götaland | 19 | 5 | — | | — | | — | | — | | 19 | 5 |
| Holmalund | Total | | 23 | 5 | — | | — | | — | | — | | 23 | 5 |
| Örgryte | 1999 | Allsvenskan | 18 | 2 | | | — | | — | | — | | 18 | 2 |
| Örgryte | 2000 | Allsvenskan | 21 | 2 | | | — | | 4 (Note: Appearances in UEFA Cup) | 0 | — | | 25 | 2 |
| Örgryte | Total | | 39 | 4 | | | — | | 4 | 0 | — | | 43 | 4 |
| Feyenoord | 2000–01 | Eredivisie | 16 | 2 | 0 | 0 | — | | — | | — | | 16 | 2 |
| Feyenoord | 2001–02 | Eredivisie | 22 | 1 | 1 | 0 | — | | 9 (Note: Two appearances and two goals in UEFA Champions League, seven appearances in UEFA Cup) | 2 | — | | 32 | 3 |
| Feyenoord | 2002–03 | Eredivisie | 1 | 0 | 0 | 0 | — | | — | | 0 | 0 | 1 | 0 |
| Feyenoord | Total | | 39 | 3 | 1 | 0 | — | | 9 | 2 | 0 | 0 | 49 | 5 |
| Djurgården (loan) | 2002 | Allsvenskan | 8 | 5 | 2 | 0 | — | | 4 | 2 | — | | 14 | 7 |
| Djurgården (loan) | 2003 | Allsvenskan | 11 | 7 | 2 | 0 | — | | — | | — | | 13 | 7 |
| Djurgården (loan) | Total | | 19 | 12 | 4 | 0 | — | | 4 | 2 | — | | 27 | 14 |
| NAC Breda (loan) | 2003–04 | Eredivisie | 31 | 7 | 2 | 0 | — | | 2 | 0 | — | | 35 | 7 |
| Brøndby | 2004–05 | Danish Superliga | 27 | 9 | 4 | 0 | — | | 1 | 0 | — | | 32 | 9 |
| Brøndby | 2005–06 | Danish Superliga | 31 | 13 | 3 | 2 | — | | 8 (Note: Four appearances and two goals in UEFA Champions League, four appearances and one goal in UEFA Cup) | 3 | — | | 42 | 18 |
| Brøndby | Total | | 58 | 22 | 7 | 2 | — | | 9 | 3 | — | | 74 | 27 |
| Toulouse | 2006–07 | Ligue 1 | 32 | 11 | 2 | 0 | 1 | 0 | — | | — | | 35 | 11 |
| Toulouse | 2007–08 | Ligue 1 | 32 | 11 | 0 | 0 | 0 | 0 | 6 (Note: Two appearances in UEFA Champions League, four appearances and one goal in UEFA Cup) | 1 | — | | 38 | 12 |
| Toulouse | Total | | 64 | 22 | 2 | 0 | 1 | 0 | 6 | 1 | — | | 73 | 23 |
| Bolton Wanderers | 2008–09 | Premier League | 30 | 5 | 1 | 0 | 0 | 0 | — | | — | | 31 | 5 |
| Bolton Wanderers | 2009–10 | Premier League | 25 | 3 | 4 | 1 | 3 | 1 | — | | — | | 32 | 5 |
| Bolton Wanderers | 2010–11 | Premier League | 37 | 10 | 6 | 2 | 2 | 0 | — | | — | | 45 | 12 |
| Bolton Wanderers | Total | | 92 | 18 | 11 | 3 | 5 | 1 | — | | — | | 108 | 22 |
| Galatasaray | 2011–12 | Süper Lig | 36 | 12 | 0 | 0 | — | | — | | — | | 36 | 12 |
| Galatasaray | 2012–13 | Süper Lig | 16 | 4 | 2 | 1 | — | | 6 (Note: Appearances in UEFA Champions League) | 0 | 1 (Note: Appearance in Turkish Super Cup) | 0 | 25 | 5 |
| Galatasaray | Total | | 52 | 16 | 2 | 1 | — | | 6 | 0 | 1 | 0 | 61 | 17 |
| Norwich City (loan) | 2013–14 | Premier League | 28 | 1 | 2 | 0 | 3 | 2 | — | | — | | 33 | 3 |
| Brøndby | 2014–15 | Danish Superliga | 20 | 1 | 2 | 1 | — | | — | | — | | 22 | 2 |
| Brøndby | 2015–16 | Danish Superliga | 25 | 5 | 4 | 1 | — | | 8 (Note: Appearances in UEFA Europa League) | 3 | — | | 37 | 9 |
| Brøndby | Total | | 45 | 6 | 6 | 2 | — | | 8 | 3 | — | | 59 | 11 |
| Örgryte | 2017 | Superettan | 23 | 4 | 1 | 1 | — | | — | | 1 (Note: Appearance in Superettan relegation play-offs) | 0 | 25 | 5 |
| Career total | | | 513 | 120 | 38 | 9 | 9 | 3 | 48 | 11 | 2 | 0 | 610 | 143 |

=== International ===
Appearances and goals by national team and year
| National team | Year | Apps | Goals |
|---|---|---|---|
| Sweden | 2002 | 2 | 0 |
| Sweden | 2003 | 4 | 3 |
| Sweden | 2004 | 4 | 1 |
| Sweden | 2005 | 6 | 3 |
| Sweden | 2006 | 9 | 1 |
| Sweden | 2007 | 6 | 3 |
| Sweden | 2008 | 8 | 0 |
| Sweden | 2009 | 7 | 1 |
| Sweden | 2010 | 5 | 1 |
| Sweden | 2011 | 11 | 3 |
| Sweden | 2012 | 6 | 2 |
| Sweden | 2013 | 6 | 2 |
| Sweden | 2014 | 8 | 0 |
| Sweden | 2015 | 3 | 0 |
| Total | | 85 | 20 |

Scores and results list Sweden's goal tally first, score column indicates score after each Elmander goal.

List of international goals scored by Johan Elmander
| No. | Date | Venue | Opponent | Score | Result | Competition |
|---|---|---|---|---|---|---|
| 1 | 16 February 2003 | Suphachalasai Stadium, Bangkok, Thailand | Qatar | 1–0 | 3–2 | 2003 King's Cup |
| 2 | 16 February 2003 | Suphachalasai Stadium, Bangkok, Thailand | Qatar | 2–0 | 3–2 | 2003 King's Cup |
| 3 | 20 February 2003 | Suphachalasai Stadium, Bangkok, Thailand | Thailand | 2–0 | 4–1 | 2003 King's Cup |
| 4 | 17 November 2004 | Easter Road, Edinburgh, Scotland | Scotland | 3–0 | 4–1 | Friendly |
| 5 | 4 June 2005 | Ullevi, Gothenburg, Sweden | Malta | 6–0 | 6–0 | 2006 FIFA World Cup qualification |
| 6 | 8 June 2005 | Råsunda Stadium, Solna, Sweden | Norway | 2–3 | 2–3 | Friendly |
| 7 | 12 November 2005 | Seoul World Cup Stadium, Seoul, South Korea | South Korea | 1–1 | 2–2 | Friendly |
| 8 | 7 October 2006 | Råsunda Stadium, Solna, Sweden | Spain | 1–0 | 2–0 | UEFA Euro 2008 qualifying |
| 9 | 28 March 2007 | Windsor Park, Belfast, Northern Ireland | Northern Ireland | 1–0 | 1–2 | UEFA Euro 2008 qualifying |
| 10 | 2 June 2007 | Parken Stadium, Copenhagen, Denmark | Denmark | 1–0 | 3–0 * | UEFA Euro 2008 qualifying |
| 11 | 2 June 2007 | Parken Stadium, Copenhagen, Denmark | Denmark | 3–0 | 3–0 * | UEFA Euro 2008 qualifying |
| 12 | 12 August 2009 | Råsunda Stadium, Solna, Sweden | Finland | 1–0 | 1–0 | Friendly |
| 13 | 3 March 2010 | Liberty Stadium, Swansea, Wales | Wales | 1–0 | 1–0 | Friendly |
| 14 | 9 February 2011 | GSP Stadium, Nicosia, Cyprus | Ukraine | 1–0 | 1–1 | 2011 Cyprus International Football Tournament |
| 15 | 3 June 2011 | Zimbru Stadium, Chişinău, Moldova | Moldova | 2–0 | 4–1 | UEFA Euro 2012 qualifying |
| 16 | 3 June 2011 | Zimbru Stadium, Chişinău, Moldova | Moldova | 3–0 | 4–1 | UEFA Euro 2012 qualifying |
| 17 | 6 September 2012 | Olympia, Helsingborg, Sweden | China | 1–0 | 1–0 | Friendly |
| 18 | 16 October 2012 | Olympic Stadium, Berlin, Germany | Germany | 3–4 | 4–4 | 2014 FIFA World Cup qualifier |
| 19 | 7 June 2013 | Ernst-Happel-Stadion, Vienna, Austria | Austria | 1–2 | 1–2 | 2014 FIFA World Cup qualifier |
| 20 | 6 September 2013 | Aviva Stadium, Dublin, Republic of Ireland | Republic of Ireland | 1–1 | 2–1 | 2014 FIFA World Cup qualifier |

* Match abandoned, see UEFA Euro 2008 qualifier fan attack.

== Honours ==
Feyenoord

- UEFA Cup: 2001–02

Djurgården

- Allsvenskan: 2002, 2003
- Svenska Cupen: 2002

Brøndby

- Danish Superliga: 2004–05
- Danish Cup: 2004–05

Galatasaray

- Süper Lig: 2011–12, 2012–13
- Turkish Super Cup: 2012

Sweden

- King's Cup: 2003

Individual

- UNFP Player of the Month (February 2007)
- Premier League Player of the Month: November 2010
