= Alkmaarderhout =

Park in Alkmaar

Coordinates: 52.625158°N 4.732928°E

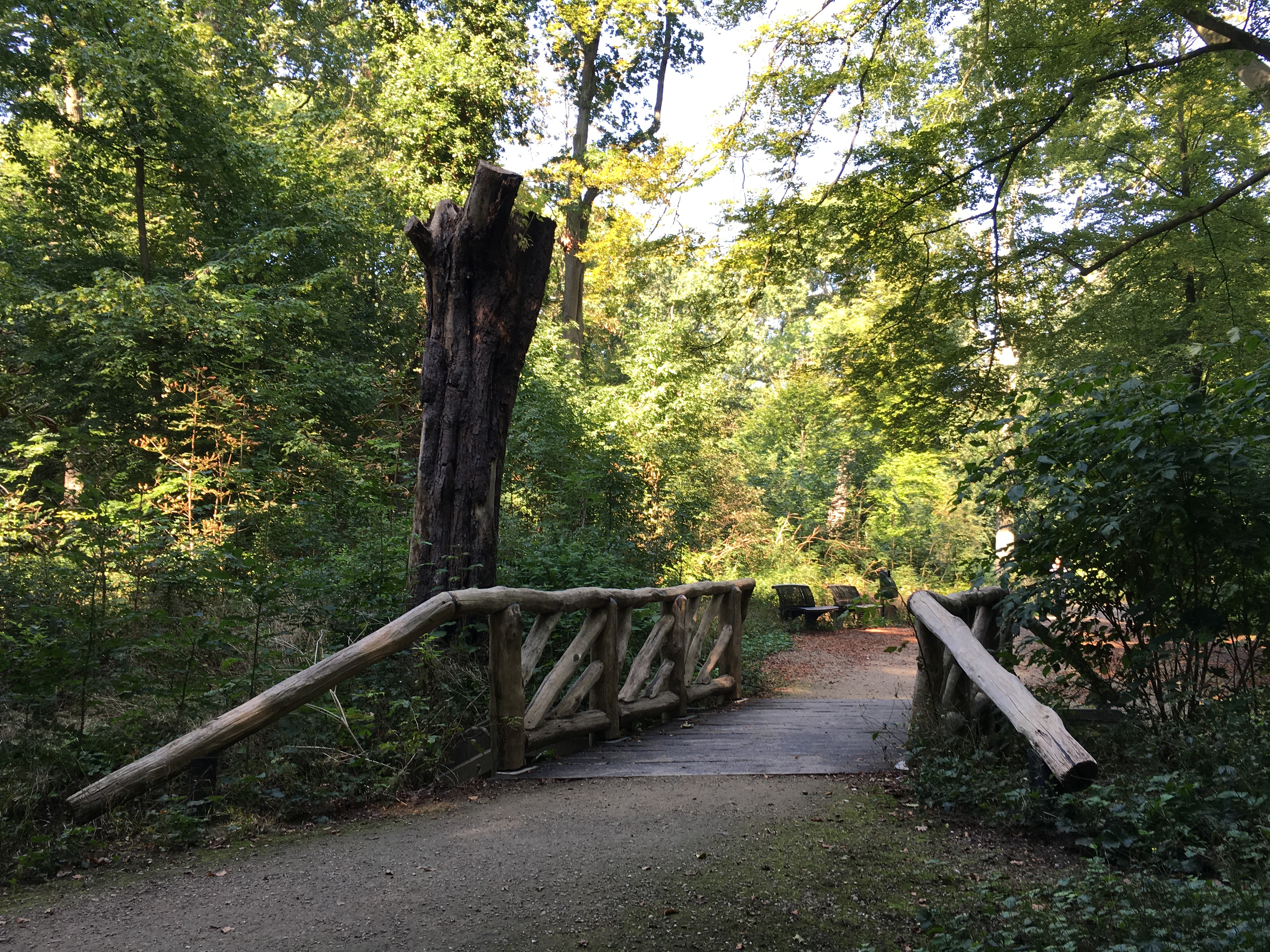

Alkmaarderhout, locally known as "De Hout" (Dutch for "the wood(s)"), in a city park in Alkmaar, North Holland, Netherlands. The park is one of the oldest city parks in the Netherlands, dating from 1607.
