= Jan de Visser =

Dutch footballer

Personal information
- Date of birth: 1 January 1968 (age 58)
- Place of birth: Hoorn, Netherlands
- Height: 1.80 m (5 ft 11 in)
- Positions: Midfielder; winger

Senior career*
Years	Team	Apps	(Gls)
–1991	AZ Alkmaar	87	(1)
1991–1999	SC Heerenveen	264	(19)
1999–2002	Feyenoord	47	(2)
Total		398	(22)
- * Club domestic league appearances and goals

Jan de Visser (born 1 January 1968) is a Dutch former professional footballer who played as a midfielder or winger for AZ, SC Heerenveen and Feyenoord.

== Career ==
Jan de Visser started his professional football career at AZ in 1988, in the home game against DS'79. After having played in Alkmaar for three seasons, De Visser left for SC Heerenveen in 1991. There he would grow to become a mainstay in the team, and would eventually play there for 8 seasons, after which he transferred to Feyenoord in 1999. In his first season with the Rotterdam team he made twenty-six appearances, but in the following seasons he made fifteen and six appearances respectively, usually as a substitute.

In 2002, De Visser decided to end his professional football career after fourteen years. After that he became a player agent and still lives in the place he was born.

== Statistics ==
Season	Club	Matches	Goals	League
1988/1989	AZ	16	0	Eerste divisie
1989/1990	AZ	34	1	Eerste divisie
1990/1991	AZ	37	0	Eerste divisie
1991/1992	sc Heerenveen	36	3	Eerste divisie
1992/1993	sc Heerenveen	32	6	Eerste divisie
1993/1994	sc Heerenveen	34	1	Eredivisie
1994/1995	sc Heerenveen	32	4	Eredivisie
1995/1996	sc Heerenveen	31	2	Eredivisie
1996/1997	sc Heerenveen	32	2	Eredivisie
1997/1998	sc Heerenveen	32	6	Eredivisie
1998/1999	sc Heerenveen	34	5	Eredivisie
1999/2000	Feyenoord	26	2	Eredivisie
2000/2001	Feyenoord	15	0	Eredivisie
2001/2002	Feyenoord	6	0	Eredivisie
Totaal		397	32	

== Honours ==
Feyenoord

- Johan Cruyff Shield: 1999
- UEFA Cup: 2002
