= Arco Jochemsen =

Dutch footballer

Personal information
- Date of birth: 21 February 1971 (age 55)
- Place of birth: Barneveld, Netherlands
- Height: 1.87 m (6 ft 2 in)
- Position: Forward

Senior career*
Years	Team	Apps	(Gls)
1994–2000	Vitesse		
2000–2001	Feyenoord		
2001–2003	Utrecht		
2003–2004	Twente		
2004–2006	Zwolle		
- * Club domestic league appearances and goals

Arco Jochemsen (born 21 February 1971) is a retired Dutch football striker.

== Honours ==
Utrecht

- KNVB Cup: 2002–03
