= Ellery Cairo =

Dutch former footballer

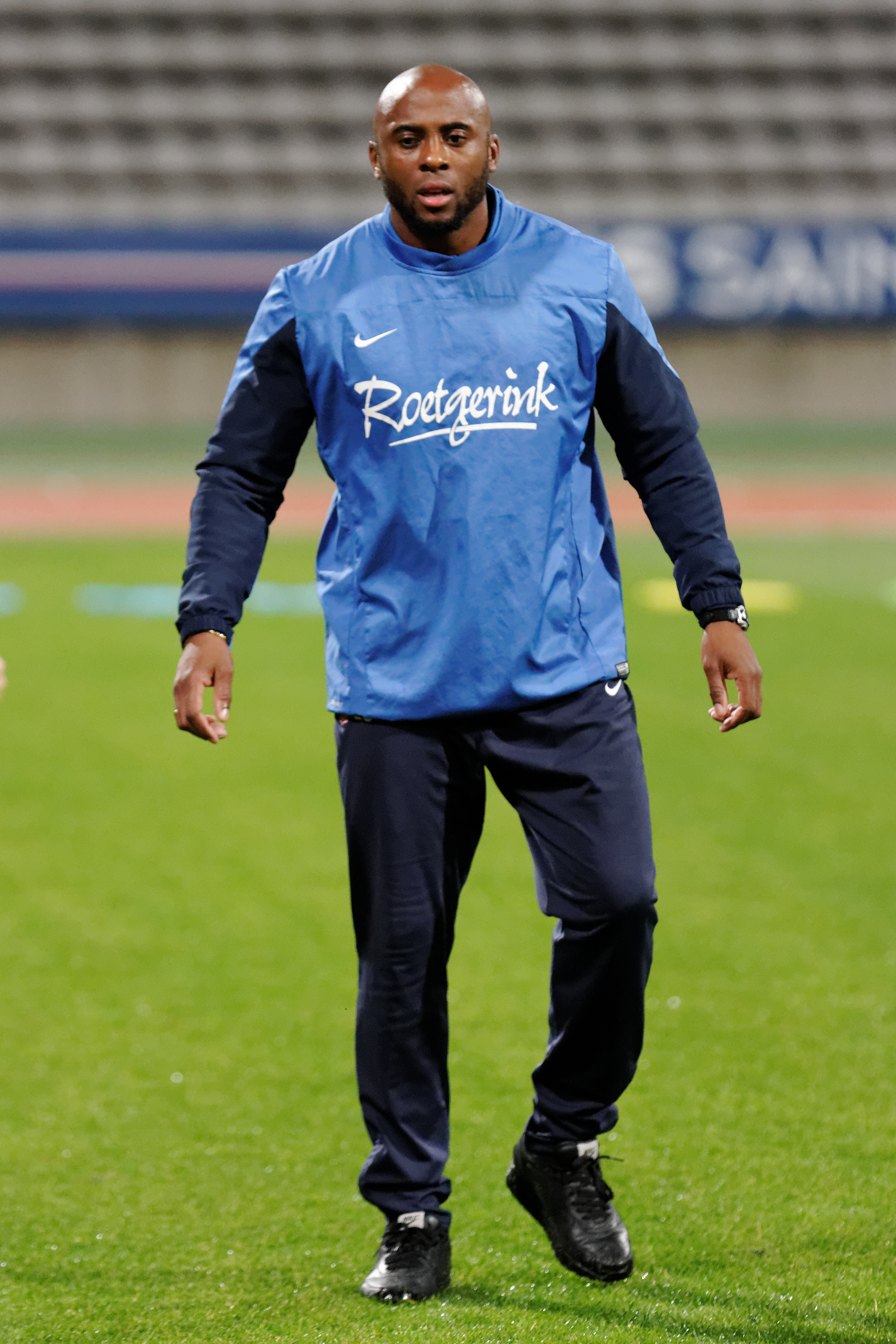
- Cairo in 2014

Personal information
- Date of birth: 3 August 1978 (age 48)
- Place of birth: Rotterdam, Netherlands
- Height: 1.78 m (5 ft 10 in)
- Position: Winger

Youth career
- Spijkenisse
- Feyenoord

Senior career*
Years	Team	Apps	(Gls)
1994–2000	Feyenoord	29	(5)
1997–1999	→ Excelsior (loan)	53	(13)
2000–2003	Twente	86	(12)
2003–2005	SC Freiburg	58	(4)
2005–2007	Hertha BSC	29	(1)
2007–2008	Coventry City	7	(0)
2008–2010	NAC	47	(2)
2010–2011	Heracles	6	(1)
2011–2012	AGOVV	28	(1)
2012	DETO	1	(0)
Total		344	(39)

International career
2000	Netherlands U21	1	(0)
- * Club domestic league appearances and goals

Ellery Cairo (born 3 August 1978) is a Dutch former professional footballer who played as a winger.

== Club career ==
Cairo played his first seasons of senior football for Feyenoord, Excelsior, Twente, SC Freiburg and Hertha BSC, before moving to English club Coventry City on 30 June 2007 on a free transfer from Hertha BSC. After only one season manager Chris Coleman announced that Cairo's contract was not to be renewed and he was subsequently released.

Several clubs were interested in signing Cairo, but it was NAC Breda who ended up with his services after friendly match against amateur club DOSKO. After he passed the medical, he signed a two-year contract, making NAC the seventh club in his career. After two seasons at the club, in which he made almost fifty appearances, often as a substitute, his expiring contract was no longer extended. As a free agent, Cairo signed with Heracles Almelo in September 2010. In 2011 he signed with AGOVV Apeldoorn. After one season, he left for amateur club DETO Twenterand. He suffered a knee injury in his first match for DETO and afterwards decided to retire.

== International career ==
Cairo received a call-up for the Netherlands national team for a friendly against Italy in 2005, after Ruud van Nistelrooy pulled out because of injury. However, Cairo never played a minute for Oranje.

== Managerial career ==
In summer 2014, Cairo was appointed assistant coach at the FC Twente women's team. He announced his departure in 2017. He has since worked as a fitness coach for Twente and as a personal trainer for players such as Kevin-Prince Boateng.

== Honours ==
Feyenoord

- Eredivisie: 1998–99
- KNVB Cup: 1994–95
- Johan Cruyff Shield: 1999

Twente

- KNVB Cup: 2000–01
